= India's Best Dancer =

Indian reality television game show

- Years: 2020 – 2026

Films and television
- Television series: India's Best Dancer Hindi; Maharashtra's Best Dancer; IBD v/s SD

Miscellaneous
- Languages: Hindi; Marathi
- Produced by: Frames Production
- Show: Dance Show
- Genre: Reality
- No.of Versions: 3
- No.of Seasons: 5
- No. of episodes: 255
- Original network: SET & SonyLIV (Hindi); Sony Marathi (Marathi)
- Original release: 29 February 2020– 27 September 2026

Official website
- India's Best Dancer

India's Best Dancer is a dance reality show. It is produced by Frames Production India. Subsequently, the show airs on Sony Entertainment Television and also available through SonyLIV OTT platforms. India's Best Dancer was originally started in Hindi language and has been extended into 2 languages spoken in the Indian sub-continent, including Marathi.

The shooting of Season 1 was halted due to the COVID-19 pandemic in India and shooting started on 13 July 2020 and broadcasts have started from 18 July 2020. The spin off Maharashtra's Best Dancer airs on Sony Marathi. Tiger Pop was the winner of Season 1. Online auditions for season 2 began on 5 May 2021 on SonyLIV. The season 2 aired on 16 October 2021. Saumya Kamble was the winner of season 2. Ground auditions for IBD Season 3 began on 19 Jan 2023 and it wrapped by the end of September 2023 declaring Samarpan Lama as the winner. Season 5 began on 6 June 2026 and ended on 27 September 2026. Ritesh Pal was the winner of this season.

== Summary ==
India's Best Dancer showcases dancers competing for the title through solo routines. According to the producers, the show promises to be "the toughest dance reality show on Indian television".

== Versions ==
Currently airing – 0
Upcoming for airing – 1
Recently concluded – 4

Language	Show	Season	Official Name	Host(s)	Judges			Episodes	Original Broadcast				Contestants	Prize Money	Winner	Winning Choreographer	Runner-up	Runner-up Choreographer			
Language	Show	Season	Official Name	Host(s)	Judges			Episodes	Premiere	Finale	Network	Online VOD	Contestants	Prize Money	Winner	Winning Choreographer	Runner-up	Runner-up Choreographer			
Hindi (हिन्दी)	India's Best Dancer	1	India's Best Dancer	Haarsh Limbachiyaa, Bharti Singh	Judges			Malaika Arora	Terence Lewis	Geeta Kapoor	48	29 February 2020	22 November 2020	SET	SonyLIV	13	₹15 lakh (US$16,000)	Tiger Pop	Vartika Jha	Mukul Gain	Pratik Utekar
Hindi (हिन्दी)	India's Best Dancer	2	India's Best Dancer: Best Ka Next Avtaar	Manish Paul	26	16 October 2021	9 January 2022	Malaika Arora	Terence Lewis	Geeta Kapoor	12	Saumya Kamble	Gaurav Sarwan	SET	SonyLIV	Rupesh Soni	₹15 lakh (US$16,000)		Vartika Jha		
Hindi (हिन्दी)	India's Best Dancer	3	India's Best Dancer: Har Move Se Karenge Prove	Jay Bhanushali	Sonali Bendre	52	8 April 2023	30 September 2023	Terence Lewis	Geeta Kapoor	14	Samarpan Lama	Bhavna Khanduja	SET	SonyLIV	Anjali Mamgai	₹15 lakh (US$16,000)	Akash Thapa			
Hindi (हिन्दी)	India's Best Dancer	4	India’s Best Dancer: Jab Dil Kare Dance Kar	Jay Bhanushali, Aniket Chauhan	Karishma Kapoor	36	13 July 2024	10 November 2024	Terence Lewis	Geeta Kapoor	14	₹15 lakh (US$16,000) & maruti suzuki swift	Steve Jywra	SET	SonyLIV	Raktim Thakuria	Nextion	Vipul Kandpal			
Hindi (हिन्दी)	IBD v/s SD; Champions ka Tashan	1	Champions ka Tashan: Dance ka Mahasangram	Haarsh Limbachiyaa	Karishma Kapoor	Malaika Arora	Remo D'Souza	28	16 November 2024	16 February 2025	14	No money reward	Tejas Varma	SET	SonyLIV	Super Dancer	Florina Gogoi	Super Dancer			
Marathi (मराठी)	Maharashtra's Best Dancer	1	Maharashtra's Best Dancer	Sankarshan Karhade, Namrata Sambherao	Dharmesh Yelande		Pooja Sawant	31	30 November 2020	14 March 2021	Sony Marathi	SonyLIV	13	₹7 lakh (US$7,300)	Prathamesh Mane	Akash Shetty	Prachi Prajapati	Shweta Warrior			

== Judges and hosts ==
	Name	IBD Season 1	MBD Season 1	IBD season 2	IBD season 3	IBD season 4	IBD Season 5
Judges	Geeta Kapoor	Judge		Judge			
Judges	Malaika Arora	Judge		Judge			
Judges	Terence Lewis	Judge		Judge			
Judges	Dharmesh Yelande		Judge				
Judges	Pooja Sawant		Judge				
Judges	Sonali Bendre				Judge		
Judges	Karisma Kapoor					Judge	
Judges	Javed Jaffrey						Judge
Hosts	Bharti Singh	Host					
Hosts	Haarsh Limbachiyaa	Host				Host	
Hosts	Jay Bhanushali				Host		
Hosts	Manish Paul			Host			
Hosts	Namrata Sambherao		Host				
Hosts	Sankarshan Karhade		Host				
Hosts	Aniket Chauhan						
Total No.		5	4	4	5	4	5

Note: Nora Fatehi replaced Malaika Arora as a judge for some episodes when Arora was unable to join the shoots during Season 1.

== Episodes ==
Indicates India's Best Dancer (Hindi Tv) Episodes.
Indicates Maharashtra's Best Dancer (Marathi Tv) Episodes.

Series	Season	Episodes	Originally released		Winner	Winning Choreographer	Network
Series	Season	Episodes	First released	Last released	Winner	Winning Choreographer	Network
Reality Show series
India's Best Dancer	1	48	29 February 2020	22 November 2020	Tiger Pop	Vartika Jha	Sony TV
India's Best Dancer	2	26	16 October 2021	9 January 2022	Soumya Kamble	Vartika Jha	Sony TV
India's Best Dancer	3	52	8 April 2023	30 September 2023	Samarpan Lama	Bhavna Khanduja	Sony TV
India's Best Dancer	4	36	13 July 2024	10 November 2024	Steve Jrywa	Raktim Thakuria	Sony TV
India's Best Dancer	5	34	6 June 2026	27 September 2026	Ritesh Pal	Pratik Utekar	Sony TV
Maharashtra's Best Dancer	1	31	30 November 2020	14 March 2021	Prathamesh Mane	Akash Shetty	Sony Marathi

== See also ==
- Dance Plus
- Dance India Dance
- Dance Deewane
- Super Dancer
- India's Got Talent
