= Dance Plus Pro =

Indian dance reality show

- Hosted by: Sushant Khatri and Tushar Shetty
- Judges: Remo D'Souza
- Coaches: Rahul Shetty; Punit Pathak; Shakti Mohan
- No. of contestants: 12
- Winner: Ritesh Pal
- Winning mentor: Shakti Mohan
- Runner-up: Rakesh Sahu

Release
- Original network: Disney+ Hotstar; Star Plus
- Original release: Disney+Hotstar: 11 December 2023 – 29 February 2024; StarPlus: 16 December 2023 – 3 March 2024

Season chronology
- ← Previous; Season 6

Dance Plus Pro is the seventh season of reality show Dance Plus, which premiered on 11 December 2023 on Disney+ Hotstar (Mon-Thu). It later premiered on StarPlus on 16 December 2023 (Sat-Sun). It is produced by Urban Brew Studios in association with Frames Productions.

This season is judged by Remo D'Souza. The captains are Rahul Shetty, Punit Pathak and Shakti Mohan, and it is hosted by Sushant Khatri and Tushar Shetty.

== Super Judge and Captains ==
Remo D'Souza, the super judge, is an Indian dancer, choreographer, actor and film director.

The following are the three captains of this season

- Shakti Mohan
- Punit Pathak
- Rahul Shetty

== Teams ==
Contestant info

Teams color key
Winner
Runner-up
Third place
Eliminated in Race to Top 8
Eliminated in Semi Finale

Captains	Top 12			
Punit	Rakesh Sahu	Brother's Bond Crew	Ritika Sharma (Replaced Sanhvi Jaiswal)	The Mystique
Shakti	Ritesh Pal	Ashish & Himanshu	Aman & Kunal	The Trend
Rahul	Ram, Ramesh & Kishan	Anshika Dhara (replaced ADA Trio)	Akanksha Priyodarshoni	Aviral & Parv

=== Dance Styles of Teams ===
Sr.	Artists	Type	Style	Team
1	Brother's Bond Crew	Group	Lyrical	Punit
2	Rakesh Sahu	Solo	Contemporary	Punit
3	The Mystique	Group	Waacking	Punit
4	Ritika Sharma	Solo	Hip-Hop	Punit
5	Ritesh Pal	Solo	Contemporary	Shakti
6	Ashish & Himanshu	Duo	Lyrical	Shakti
7	The Trend	Group	K-pop	Shakti
8	Aman & Kunal	Duo	Hip-Hop	Shakti
9	Ram, Ramesh & Kishan	Trio	B-Boying	Rahul
10	Anshika Dhara	Solo	Popping	Rahul
11	Akanksha Priyodarshoni	Solo	Freestyle	Rahul
12	Aviral & Parv	Duo	Lyrical	Rahul

== Score Chart ==
Captain's info

- Team Punit
- Team Shakti
- Team Rahul

Contestant info

Position color key
Winner
Runner-up
Third place
Eliminated in Race to Top 4
Advanced to Top 8
Eliminated in Race to 8
Eliminated in Semi Finale
Advanced to Top 30 in Auditions
Advanced to Top 12 in Mega Auditions
Finalist
Not Performed

- (Punit C) Captain Punit's Challenge
- (Shakti C) Captain Shakti's Challenge
- (Rahul C) Captain Rahul's Challenge
- (B) Bonus Battle
- (RC) Remo's Challenge Round
- (SD) Final Showdown
- (W) Winner
- (L) Loser
- (NP) Not Perform
- (K) King Song Round
- (U) Urfi Costume Round
- (Team Punit), (Team Shakti) and (Team Rahul) For Team Swap Challenge Round
- (D) Dharmesh (D Factor) Jama Round
- Captains (5*3=15) + Remo's Score (10 Plus or 15 Double Plus) = 30 (Highest Score Possible)

The Scores Were Given In The Following Manner:

1. A captain can score out of 5 and Super Judge Remo can score out of 10. Remo also had the power to give double plus to the team and the team gets an additional 5 points.

2. The first 3 rounds are the Captain's challenge round. Each captain gave a challenge: Colab round, Pro it up, etc. One artist from each team performs. The fourth round is Remo's challenge and only the winner gets 10 points from Remo.

3. Sum of all 4 rounds are calculated and the top 2 teams with the highest scores go into final showdown.

4. One artist from each of the winning teams battle in the final showdown and the winner is decided by Remo. The team whose artist win the final showdown is the winner of that week.

5. The winning captain chooses two performers from their team to advance to the Pro 8 and Remo can choose 1 amongst them.

Results By WeekScores Out Of 5/10/20/30/40/
Contestants	Audition (Studio round)	Audition (Studio round)	Grand Opening Top 12	Race to Pro 8							Race to Pro 4	Pro Finale	Results
Episodes	1–4	5–8	9–12	13–16	17–20	21–24	25–28	29–32	33–36	37–40	41–45	46–49	
Total Score			for Remo Plus (+)	45								Finale Performance	Pro Battle
Ritesh Pal	Advanced to Studio Round	Advanced to Studio Round	+	21+0+0+10 (31)(Rahul C) (W) (FS) pro8	25+0+0 (25) (Rahul C)	(0) Remo C	25+0+0 (25) (Shakti C)	(10) (Remo C)	25+5+0 (30) (Punit C)	NP Ashish&Himanshu p 22+0+0 (22) (Rahul C)	25+0+10 (35) Pro 4	Secret scores given by Plus Panel Remo D'Souza, Geeta Kapoor & Terence Lewis	Winner
Rakesh Sahu	Advanced to Studio Round	Advanced to Studio Round	+	25+5+0 (30)(Rahul C) (L) (FS)	25+5+0 (30) (Punit C)	25+0+0 (35) (Rahul C) (D) (W) (FS) pro8	25+0+0 (25) (Shakti C)	NP (0) (Remo C)	25+5+0 (30) (Rahul C)	25+0+0 (25) (Shakti C) L (FS)	25+5+10 (40) Pro 4	Secret scores given by Plus Panel Remo D'Souza, Geeta Kapoor & Terence Lewis	1st Runner-up
Aman & Kunal	Advanced to Studio Round	Advanced to Studio Round	+	(10) (Remo C)	20+0+0 (20) (Shakti C) (U)	25+0+0 (25) (Rahul C) (D)	22+0+0 (22) (Rahul C)	22+0+0 (22) (Rahul C) (W) (FS) Pro 8	25+5+0 (30) (Rahul C)	25+5+0 (30) + Vartika Jha (Punit C)	25+0+10 (35) Pro 4	Secret scores given by Plus Panel Remo D'Souza, Geeta Kapoor & Terence Lewis	2nd Runner-up
ADA Trio (Weeks 1–6), Anshika Dhara (Week 7 Onwards)	Advanced to Studio Round	Advanced to Studio Round	+	22+0+0 (22) (Shakti c)	(0) (Remo C)	22+0+0 (22) (Shakti C) (Team Shakti)	25+0+0 (25) (Rahul C)	25+0+0 (25) (Rahul C)	25+5+0 (30) (Rahul C)	25+5+0 (30) + Saumya Kamble (Punit C) W (FS) Pro 8	25+0+10 (35) Pro 4	Secret scores given by Plus Panel Remo D'Souza, Geeta Kapoor & Terence Lewis	Eliminate for Pro finale Battle (4th position)
Ashish & Himanshu	Advanced to Studio Round	Advanced to Studio Round	+	25+0+10 (35) (Shakti C)	21+0+0+10 (21) (Punit C) (W) (FS) Pro 8	24+0+0 (24) (Punit C)	(0) (Remo C)	25+0+0 (25) (Shakti C)	(0) (Remo C)	23+0+0 (Shakti C)	25+0+0 (25)	Eliminated	
Sahnvi Jaiswal (Weeks 1–3), Ritika Sharma (Week 4 Onwards)	Advanced to Studio Round	Advanced to Studio Round	Not In Show	(0) (Remo C)	21+0+0 (21) (Rahul C)	24+0+0 (24) (Punit C)	23+0+0 (23) (Punit C) (W) (FS)	25+0+0 (25) (Rahul C)	25+0+0 (25) (Shakti C) (W) (FS)	25+5+0 (30) + Tejas Varma (Punit C)	25+0+0 (25)	Eliminated	
Brother's Bond Crew	Advanced to Studio Round	Advanced to Studio Round	+	25+5+10 (40) (Punit C) (K)	(0) (Remo C) (L) (FS)	(0) (Remo C) (W) (FS)	23+0+0 (23) (Rahul C) Pro 8	25+5+0 (30) (Shakti C)	(10) (Remo C)	25+0+0 (25) (Rahul C)	24+0+0 (24)	Eliminated	
Ram, Ramesh & Kishan	Advanced to Studio Round	Advanced to Studio Round	+	25+5+0 (30) (Punit C) (K)	25+0+0 (25) (Punit C)	10 (Remo C) (W) (FS) Pro 8	25+0+0 (25) (Punit C)	19+0+0 (19) (Punit C)	(0) (Remo C)	(10) (Remo C)	25+5+0 (35)	Eliminated	
Akanksha Priyodarshoni	Advanced to Studio Round	Advanced to Studio Round	+	(0) (Remo C)	21+0+0 (21) (Shakti C) (U)	25+0+0 (25) (Punit C)	22+0+0 (22) (Shakti C) (L) (SD)	25+0+0 (25) (Shakti C)	25+0+0 (25) (Punit C)	22+0+0 (22) (Shakti C)	Eliminated		
The Trend	Advanced to Studio Round	Advanced to Studio Round	No	22+0+0 (22) (Punit C) (K)	(10) (Remo C)	22+0+0 (22) (Shakti C) (Team Punit)	24+0+0 (24) (Punit C) (L) (FS)	21+0+0 (21) (Punit C)	21+0+0 (21) (Shakti C) (L) (FS)	(0) (Remo C)	Eliminated		
Aviral & Parv	Advanced to Studio Round	Advanced to Studio Round	+	25+0+0 (35) (Rahul C)	22+0+0 (25) (Rahul C)	23+0+0 (23) (Rahul C)(D)	(10) (Remo C)	(0) (Remo C)	22+0+0 (22) (Shakti C)	25+5+0 (30) (Rahul C)	Eliminated		
The Mystique	Advanced to Studio Round	Advanced to Studio Round	+	21+0+0 (21) (Shakti C)	35+0+0 (35) (Shakti C) (U)	22+0+0 (22) (Shakti C) (Team Rahul)	(0) (Remo C)	25+0+0 (25) (Punit C) (L) (FS)	25+0+0 (25) (Punit C)	(0) (Remo C)	Eliminated		

Final Showdown Race To Pro 8 (Team Score)

Week.	Team Shakti	Team Punit	Team Rahul
4	87+10=97 Battle W	91 Battle L	77 NP
5	67+10=77 Battle W	76 Battle L	68 NP
6 Tie	71 NP	76 Battle Tie W	70+10=80 Battle Tie W
7	71 Battle L	71 Battle W	72+10=82 Battle L
8	68+10=78 Battle W	80 Battle L	69 NP
9	81 Battle L	80+10=90 Battle W	77 NP
10	75 NP	80 Battle L	82+10=92 Battle W

Final Showdown Race To Pro 4 (Contestant Score)

Date	Contestant 1	Contestant 2	Result
19th Feb	Ram, Ramesh & Kishan (Team Rahul) 25+5+0 (30)	Rakesh Sahu (Team Punit) 25+5+10 (40)	Rakesh Sahu
20th Feb	Ritesh Pal (Team Shakti) 25+0+10 (35)	Brother's Bond Crew (Team Punit) 24+0+0 (24)	Ritesh Pal
21st Feb	Aman & Kunal (Team Shakti) 25+0+10 (35)	Ritika Sharma (Team Punit) 25+0+0 (25)	Aman & Kunal
22nd feb	Anshika Dhara (Team Rahul) 25+0+10 (35)	Ashish & Himanshu (Team Shakti) 25+0+0 (25)	Anshika Dhara

Finale Showdown Ultimate Pro Battle

Date	Contestant 1	Contestant 2	Contestant 3	Pro Winner
29th Feb	Ritesh Pal	Rakesh Sahu	Aman & Kunal	Ritesh Pal

== Winners of Weekly Final Showdowns ==
Week	Team
4th	Shakti
5th	Shakti
6th	Punit
6th	Rahul
7th	Punit
8th	Shakti
9th	Punit
10th	Rahul

== Pro 8 ==
Top	Artists	Type	Style	Team
1	Ritesh Pal	Solo	Contemporary	Shakti
2	Ashish & Himanshu	Duo	Lyrical	Shakti
3	Aman & Kunal	Duo	Hip-Hop	Shakti
4	Ram, Ramesh & Kishan	Trio	B-Boying	Rahul
5	Anshika Dhara	Solo	Popping	Rahul
6	Rakesh Sahu	Solo	Contemporary	Punit
7	Brother's Bond Crew	Group	Lyrical	Punit
8	Ritika Sharma	Solo	Hip-Hop	Punit

== Pro 4 ==
Top	Artists	Type	Style	Team	Position
1	Ritesh Pal	Solo	Contemporary	Shakti	Winner
2	Rakesh Sahu	Solo	Contemporary	Punit	1st Runner Up (also Fanzone Winner)
3	Aman & Kunal	Duo	Hip-Hop	Shakti	2nd Runner Up
4	Anshika Dhara	Solo	Popping	Rahul	4th

== Special Guests ==
Sr.	Guest(s)	Episode	Reason
1	King	1 January	For Captain Punit Challenge Artist Performing On King Songs
2	Urfi Javed	8 January	For Captain Shakti Challenge Artist Performing In Urfi's Costumes
3	Dharmesh Yelande	16 - 18 January	For Captain Rahul Challenge Artists Performing On D Jama
4	D-Cypher	16 January	Beat Boxing For Captain Rahul Challenge D Jama Collaborative Performance With Aman & Kunal From Team Shakti
5	Dino James	22 January	For Captain Shakti Challenge Artists Performing On Dino James songs
5	GD 47	22 January	Promoting New Song With Dino James
6	Nora Fatehi	29 - 31 January	For Captain Rahul Challenge Artists Performing On Nora's Songs In Her Style
7	Guru Randhawa	5 - 6 February	For Captain Punit Challenge Artist Performing In Torda Desi Torda Yo In Guru's Songs
8	Quick Style	12 - 13 February	For Captain Shakti Challenge Artists Performing On Quick Style's Favourite Bollywood Songs
9	Vartika Jha, Saumya Kamble & Tejas Varma	14 - 15 February	For Captain Punit Challenge Artists Performing With The Dance Icons
10	Jonita Gandhi	15 February	Promoting Her New Video Song
11	Orry	19 - 21 February	To Support The Artists
12	Geeta Kapoor, Terence Lewis, Dharmesh Yelande, Vartika Jha, Yo Highness & Gang 13	26 - 29 February	For Pro Finale
