= India's Best Dancer (Hindi TV series) =

Indian reality television show

- Also known as: IBD
- Genre: Dance Reality show
- Presented by: Bharti Singh; (Season 1); Haarsh Limbachiyaa; (Season 1); Manish Paul; (Season 2); Jay Bhanushali; (Season 3-4); Aniket Chauhan; (Season 4); Haarsh Limbachiyaa; (Season 5-present)
- Judges: Malaika Arora; (Season 1-2); Nora Fatehi; (Guest Judge); (Season 1-2); Geeta Kapoor; (Season 1-present); Terence Lewis; (Season 1-Present); Sonali Bendre; (Season 3); Karishma Kapoor; (Season 4 - Present); Javed Jaffrey; (Season 5- Present)
- Country of origin: India
- Original language: Hindi
- No. of seasons: 5
- No. of episodes: 196

Production
- Producers: Sony Entertainment Television; Frames Production Company Pvt. Ltd.
- Running time: Approx. 90 minutes
- Production company: Frames Production Company Pvt ltd

Original release
- Network: Sony Entertainment Television
- Release: 29 February 2020 – 27 September 2026

India's Best Dancer is an Indian Hindi-language television reality dance show of the India's Best Dancer franchise which airs on Sony Entertainment Television and also available through SonyLIV OTT platforms in India. The show was first developed by Frames Production in the India.

The shooting of Season 1 was halted due to the COVID-19 pandemic in India and shooting started on 13 July 2020 and broadcasts have started from 18 July 2020. Tiger Pop was the winner of Season 1. Online auditions for season 2 began on 5 May 2021 on SonyLIV. The season 2 aired on 16 October 202

== Series overview ==
Season	Host(s)	Judges				Episodes	Original broadcast			Contestants	Prize money	Winner	Winning choreographer	Runner-up	Runner-up choreographer
Season		Judges				Episodes	Premiere	Finale	Network	Contestants	Prize money	Winner	Winning choreographer	Runner-up	Runner-up choreographer
1	Haarsh L., Bharti Singh	Geeta Kapoor	Terence Lewis	Malaika Arora		48	29 February 2020	22 November 2020	Sony Entertainment Television	13	₹15 lakh (US$16,000)	Tiger Pop	Vartika Jha	Mukul Gain	Pratik Utekar
2	Manish Paul	Geeta Kapoor	Terence Lewis	Malaika Arora		26	16 October 2021	9 January 2022	Sony Entertainment Television	12	₹15 lakh (US$16,000)	Saumya Kamble	Vartika Jha	Gaurav Sarwan	Rupesh Soni
3	Jay Bhanushali	Geeta Kapoor	Terence Lewis	Sonali Bendre		52	8 April 2023	30 September 2023	Sony Entertainment Television	14	₹15 lakh (US$16,000)	Samarpan Lama	Bhavna Khanduja	Anjali Mamgai	Akash Thapa
4	Jay Bhanushali, Aniket Chauhan	Geeta Kapoor	Terence Lewis	Karisma Kapoor		36	13 July 2024	10 November 2024	Sony Entertainment Television	14	₹15 lakh (US$16,000)	Steve Jrywa	Raktim Thakuria	Nextion	vipul khandpal
5	Haarsh Limbachiyaa	Geeta Kapoor	Terence Lewis	Karisma Kapoor	Javed Jaffrey	34	6th June 2026	27th September 2026	Sony Entertainment Television	12	₹15 lakh (US$16,000)	Ritesh Pal	Pratik Utekar	Anshika Dhara	Rupesh Soni

=== Spin-off ===
Season	Host(s)	Judges			Episodes	Original broadcast			Contestants	Prize money	Winner	Winning choreographer	Winning Team	Runner-up	Runner-up choreographer	Runner-up Team
Season	Host(s)	Judges			Episodes	Premiere	Finale	Network	Contestants	Prize money	Winner	Winning choreographer	Winning Team	Runner-up	Runner-up choreographer	Runner-up Team
Champions ka Tashan- IBD v/s SD	Haarsh Limbachiyaa	Geeta Kapoor	Remo D'Souza	Malaika Arora		16 November 2024		Sony Entertainment Television			Tejas		style="background: #DFF; color:black; vertical-align: middle; text-align: center;" class="table-cast"|			

== Judges and hosts ==
Name's	IBD (Season 1)	IBD (Season 2)	IBD (Season 3)	IBD (Season 4)	IBD (Season 5)
Geeta Kapoor	Judge	Judge	Judge	Judge	Judge
Malaika Arora	Judge	Judge			
Sonali Bendre			Judge		
Terence Lewis	Judge	Judge	Judge	Judge	Judge
Karishma Kapoor				Judge	Judge
Javed Jaffrey					Judge
Bharti Singh	Host				
Haarsh Limbachiyaa	Host				Host
Jay Bhanushali			Host	Host	
Manish Paul		Host			
Aniket Chauhan			Contestant	Host	
Total No.	5	4	4	5	5

Note: Nora Fatehi replaced Malaika Arora as a judge for some episodes when Arora was unable to join the shoots during Season 1.

== Seasons ==
=== Season 1 ===
India's Best Dancer 1 first season was premiered on 29 February 2020 on Sony Entertainment Television and Sony Entertainment Television Asia. This season was judged by Geeta Kapoor, Terence Lewis and Malaika Arora and hosted by Haarsh Limbachiyaa and Bharti Singh. The Grand Finale was aired on 22 November 2020 and winner was Tiger Pop.

=== Season 2 ===
India's Best Dancer 2 also known as India's Best Dancer: Best Ka Next Avatar is the second season and premiered on 16 October 2021 on Sony Entertainment Television. This season judged by Geeta Kapoor, Terence Lewis and Malaika Arora for the second time and hosted by Manish Paul. The Grand Finale was aired on 9 January 2022 and Saumya Kamble was declared as the winner.

=== Season 3 ===
India's Best Dancer 3 also known as India's Best Dancer: Har Move Se Karenge Prove is the third season and premiered from 8 April 2023 on Sony Entertainment Television. This season will be judged by Geeta Kapoor, Terence Lewis and Sonali Bendre and hosted by Jay Bhanushali. The Grand Finale was aired on 30 September 2023 and Samarpan Lama was declared as the winner.

=== Season 4 ===
India's Best Dancer 4 also known as India's Best Dancer: Jab Dil Kare Dance Kar is the fourth season and premiered fon July 13, 2024 on Sony Entertainment Television. This season will be judged by Geeta Kapoor, Terence Lewis and Karishma Kapoor and hosted by Jay Bhanushali and Aniket Chauhan.

=== Season 5 ===
India's Best Dancer 5 is the fifth season set to premiered on 6 June 2026 on Sony Entertainment Television. This season was judged by Geeta Kapoor, Terence Lewis Karishma Kapoor & Javed Jaffrey and hosted by Haarsh Limbachiyaa.

== Spinoff ==
- Maharashtra's Best Dancer
- Champions Ka Tashan-IBD v/s SD

== Choreographer details ==
Choreographer's name	Contestant's name				
Choreographer's name	Season 1	Season 2	Season 3	Season 4	Season 5
Anuradha Iyengar	Paramdeep Singh	Sanket Gaonkar	Hansvi Tonk^{[4]}		
Aishwarya Radhakrishnan	Swetha Warrier^{[1]}				
Aryan Patra		Raktim Thakuria	Anjali Mamgai^{[4]}		
Ashish Patil	Rutuja Junnarkar				
Bhawna Khanduja	Swetha Warrier	Muskan Singh^{[3]}	Samarpan Lama		
Chandani Srivastava		Milind Bhatt			
Pratik Utekar	Mukul Gain			Harsh Keshri	
Kumar Sharma		Muskan Singh			
Rupesh Soni		Gourav Sarwan	Aniket Chauhan^{[4]}	Divyajyoti Naik	
Noel Alexander	Adnan Ahmed Khan				
Pankaj Thapa	Subhranil Paul	Dibbay Das	Ram Bisht		
Pankaj Thapa	Subhranil Paul	Dibbay Das	Vipul Khandpal	Arjun Sathe	
Arundhati Garnaik			Apeksha Londhe		
Subranil Paul	As Contestant		Sushmita Tamang		
Subranil Paul	As Contestant		Akshay Pal	Akina	Geetanjali Marwaha
Swetha Warrier	As Contestant		Shivanshu Soni^{[4]}		
Rishabh Sharma	Himanshi Gurheriya^{[2]}				
Sonali Kar		Zamroodh	Shivam Wankhede^{[4]}		
Paramdeep Singh	As Contestant		Samarpan Lama^{[4]}		
Sushant Khatri	Adnan Ahmed Khan^{[2]}				
Amardeep Singh Natt	Himanshi Gurheriya		Akshay Pal		
Himanshu Parihar	Sadhwi Majumdar				
Saumya Kamble		As Contestant	Boogie LLB	Chitrakshi Batra	
Vartika Jha	Tiger Pop	Saumya Kamble	Akshay Pal	Nepo	
Sagar Bora	Aman Shah				
Sadhwi Majumdar	As Contestant	Apeksha Sukheja		Ishani Nag	
Sanam Johar		Roza Rana			
Akash Thapa			Anjali Mamgai	Rohan Choudhary	
Paul Marshall	Md.Akib	Kanchi Shah			
Raktim Thakuria		As Contestant	Vipul Khandpal^{[4]}	Steve Jyrwa	
Tushar Shetty	Sonal Vichare	Akash Tambedkar	Norbu Tamang		Prathamesh Mane
Tarun Raj Nihalani			Debparna Goswami		
Vaibhav Ghuge	Raj Sharma		Shivam Wankhede	Aditya Crazyy	
Vaibhav Ghuge	Raj Sharma		Hansvi Tonk		
Rutuja Junnarkar	As Contestant		Hansvi Tonk		
Vivek Chachere			Shivanshu Soni		
Kartik Raja			Aniket Chauhan	Amos Mathi	
Gourav Sarwan		As Contestant	Aniket Chauhan		
Vipul Khandpal			As Contestant	Nextion	Garima Choudhry
Shivanshu Soni			As Contestant	Vaishnavi Shekhawat	
Ashutosh Pawar				Nikhil Patnayak	
Mini Pradhan					
Winner Runner-up Finalists

Notes

- ^1: Aishwarya Radhakrishnan appeared only for Grand Premiere as Choreographer of Swetha Warrier in Season 1 and was replaced by Bhavna Khanduja for rest of the season.
- ^2: Rishabh Sharma and Sushant Khatri were replaced by Amardeep Singh Natt and Noel Alexander respectively as choreographers of Himanshi Gurheriya and Adnan Ahmed Khan respectively in Season 1.
- ^3: Bhavna Khanduja was replaced by Kumar Sharma as choreographer of Muskan Singh in Season 2.
- ^4: Anuradha Iyengar, Aryan Patra, Vartika Jha, Raktim Thakuria, Rupesh Soni, Swetha Warrier, Paramdeep Singh, Sonali Kar were replaced by Rutuja Junnarkar, Akash Thapa, Subhranil Paul, Pankaj Thapa, Kartik Raja, Vivek Chachere, Bhawna Khanduja, Vaibhav Ghuge respectively in Season 3. After elimination of Sushmita Tamang, her choreographer Subhranil replaced Amardeep as choreographer of Akshay Pal.
