= Superstar Singer =

Indian singing reality show

- Genre: Reality
- Developed by: TCT and Studio Next Production
- Creative director: Neeraj Sharma
- Presented by: Jay Bhanushali; Aditya Narayan; Haarsh Limbachiyaa
- Judges: Javed Ali; Alka Yagnik; Himesh Reshammiya; Neha Kakkar
- Theme music composer: Himesh Reshammiya
- Opening theme: "Superstar Singer"
- Ending theme: "Superstar Singer"
- Country of origin: India
- Original language: Hindi
- No. of seasons: 3
- No. of episodes: 111

Production
- Producer: Gautam Mrinal
- Camera setup: Multi-camera
- Running time: 90 minutes
- Production company: Frames Production

Original release
- Network: Sony Entertainment Television
- Release: 29 June 2019 – present

Related
- Super Singer (Bengali reality show)

Superstar Singer is an Indian Hindi-language singing reality show that is broadcast on Sony Entertainment Television. It is aimed at kids between the ages of 7 and 15. Auditions for the third season began in January 2024. And after finale The Season Ended On August 2024

== Judges ==
=== Season 1 ===
The first season was judged by Himesh Reshammiya, Javed Ali, Alka Yagnik. The season premiered on 29 June 2019.

=== Season 2 ===
Himesh Reshammiya, Javed Ali, and Alka Yagnik, all three judges of the first season, returned for the second season as well. The season premiered on 23 April 2022.

=== Season 3 ===
The third season was judged by Neha Kakkar as Super Judge. The season premiered on 9 March 2024.

== Seasons Overview ==
Season	Premiere	Finale	Judges			Captains					Host	Winner(s)	
Season	Premiere	Finale	Judges			Captains					Host	Contestant	Captain
1	29 June 2019	6 October 2019	Javed Ali	Alka Yagnik	Himesh Reshammiya	Salman Ali	Nitin Kumar	Jyotica Tangri	Sachin Kumar Valmiki		Jay Bhanushali	Prity Bhattacharjee	Nitin Kumar
2	23 April 2022	3 September 2022	Javed Ali	Alka Yagnik	Himesh Reshammiya	Salman Ali	Pawandeep Rajan	Arunita Kanjilal	Sayli Kamble	Mohd. Danish	Aditya Narayan	Md.Faiz	Arunita Kanjilal
3	9 March 2024	4 August 2024	Neha Kakkar			Salman Ali	Pawandeep Rajan	Arunita Kanjilal	Sayli Kamble	Mohd. Danish	Haarsh Limbachiyaa	Avirbhav S & Atharva B	Arunita Kanjilal & Pawandeep Rajan

== Season 1 ==
=== Super 16 Contestants ===
Color key
Team Salman Ali
Team Nitin Kumar
Team Jyotica Tangri
Team Sachin Kumar Valmiki

Contestant	Result	Place Finished
Prity Bhattacharjee	Winner; 6 October 2019	1st
Chaitanya Devadhe	Runners-up; 6 October 2019	2nd
Sneha Shankar	Runners-up; 6 October 2019	2nd
Nishtha Sharma	Runners-up; 6 October 2019	2nd
Harshit Nath	Runners-up; 6 October 2019	2nd
Ankona Mukherjee	Runners-up; 6 October 2019	2nd
Tapolabdha Sardar	Eliminated; 28 September 2019	7th
Shekinah Mukhiya	Eliminated; 28 September 2019	7th
Mohammed Fazil	Eliminated; 21 September 2019	9th
Sattwik Das	Eliminated; 21 September 2019	9th
Soyeb Ali	Eliminated; 14 September 2019	11th
Urgen Tsomu	Eliminated; 14 September 2019	11th
Thanu Khan	Eliminated; 8 September 2019	13th
Guntaas	Eliminated; 8 September 2019	13th
Biren Dang	Eliminated; 11 August 2019	15th
Arohi Roy	Eliminated; 11 August 2019	15th

== Season 2 ==
=== Top 15 contestants ===
Color key
Team Pawandeep Rajan
Team Arunita Kanjilal
Team Sayli Kamble Patil
Team Salman Ali
Team Mohd Danish

Contestant	Result	Place Finished
Mohammad Faiz	Winner; 3 September 2022	1st
Mani Dharamkot	1st Runner-up; 3 September 2022	2nd
Sayisha Gupta	2nd Runner-up; 3 September 2022	3rd
Rituraj	3rd runner-up 3 September 2022	4th
Pranjal Biswas	3rd runner-up 3 September 2022	4th
Aryananda R Babu	3rd runner-up 3 September 2022	4th
Rohan Das	Eliminated; 28 August 2022	7th
Samaira Mahajan	Eliminated; 28 August 2022	7th
Chetanya Vash	Eliminated; 28 August 2022	7th
Pratyush Anand	Eliminated; 28 August 2022	7th
Soyeb Ali	Eliminated; 28 August 2022	7th
Aruna Das	Eliminated; 31 July 2022	12th
Vishwaja Jadhav	Eliminated; 10 July 2022	13th
Sayantani Kanjilal	Eliminated; 12 June 2022	14th
Harshita Bhattacharya	Eliminated; 12 June 2022	14th

== Season 3 ==
=== Top 15 Contestants ===
Color key
Team Pawandeep Rajan
Team Arunita Kanjilal
Team Sayali Kamble Patil
Team Salman Ali
Team Mohd Danish

Contestant	Result	Place Finished
Avirbhav S	Winners; 4 August 2024	1st
Atharv Bakshi	Winners; 4 August 2024	1st
Shubh Sutradhar	Runners-up; 14 August 2024	3rd
Pihu Sharma	Runners-up; 14 August 2024	3rd
Kshitij Saxena	Runners-up; 14 August 2024	3rd
Master Aryan	Runners-up; 14 August 2024	3rd
Khushi Nagar	Runners-up; 14 August 2024	3rd
Devanasriya K	Runners-up; 14 August 2024	3rd
Laisel Rai	Runners-up; 14 August 2024	3rd
Diya Hegde	Withdrew; 2 June 2024	10th
Nishant Gupta	Withdrew; 25 May 2024	11th
Miah Essa Mehak	Withdrew; 11 May 2024	12th
Vaishnavi Panicker	Withdrew; 11 May 2024	12th
Rajdeep Ghosh	Eliminated; 28 April 2024	14th
Arjun Singh	Eliminated; 28 April 2024	14th

== Super Finale ==
=== Season 1 ===
The show came to an end with a Super Finale that was scheduled to be held on 6 October 2019 on Sony TV, with six top finalists from which the winner was to be decided on the basis of public votes.

The winner, Prity Bhattacharjee, was awarded the 'Superstar Singer Trophy', along with the cash prize of ₹15,00,000. Apart from this, all the six top contestants received an educational scholarship of ₹2,00,000 each.

=== Season 2 ===
Season 2 came to an end with Super Finale that was scheduled to be held on 3 September 2022 on Sony TV, with six top finalists from which the winner was to be decided on the basis of public votes.

The winner, Mohammad Faiz, was awarded the 'Superstar Singer Trophy', along with the cash prize of ₹15,00,000. Apart from this, all the six top contestants received an educational scholarship by BYJU'S of ₹5,00,000 each.Mani from Dharamkot was announced as the runner-up and Mohali's Sayisha Gupta was declared as the second runner-up.

=== Season 3 ===
Season 3 came to an end with Super Finale that was scheduled to be held on 4 August 2024 on Sony TV, with nine top finalists from which the winners were to be decided on the basis of public votes and judge's choice.

The winners, Avirbhav S and Atharva Bakshi, were awarded the 'Superstar Singer Trophy', along with the cash prize of ₹10,00,000 where Avirbhav S won the basis of public votes and Atharva Bakshi won the basis of judge's choice. Apart from this, Other top seven contestants received ₹1,00,000 each.

All the top nine contestants each received ₹1,00,000 as a gift from Super Judge Neha Kakkar.

== Guests ==
=== Season 1 ===
Episode	Guests
9 & 10	Kumar Sanu and Udit Narayan to celebrate Epic 90's.
11	Anu Malik and Sameer Anjaan.
12	Badshah to celebrate Dosti Special with Badshah.
14	Suresh Wadkar.
17 & 18	Pyarelal Sharma to celebrate Laxmikant–Pyarelal Special.
23	Dharmendra, Sunny Deol, Karan Deol and Sahher Bambba, to promote their upcoming film Pal Pal Dil Ke Paas and for Dhamakedar Deols.
25	Anu Malik, Neha Kakkar, and Vishal Dadlani, to promote their upcoming show Indian Idol 11.
26	Annu Kapoor for Golden Era with Annu Kapoor.
27 & 28	Udit Narayan, Anu Malik, and Aditya Narayan for 90's return with Anu Malik and Udit Narayan.
30	Pyarelal Ramprasad Sharma, Anu Malik and Kiku Sharda at Super Finale.

=== Season 2 ===
Episode	Guests
10	Anandji Virji Shah to Celebrate Kalyanji–Anandji Special.
11	Udit Narayan and Anuradha Paudwal to Celebrate 90s Songs Special.
14	Govinda and Chunky Panday for Gobinda and Chunky Special.
15	Bharti Singh and Haarsh Limbachiyaa to make the contestants wishes come true.
16	Shilpa Shetty to celebrate Superwomen of India.
17	Zeenat Aman and Ramdev to Celebrate Dev Anand Special.
18	Varun Dhawan, Anil Kapoor & Kiara Advani to promote their upcoming film Jugjugg Jeeyo and Celebrate R.D. Burman Special.
19	Jaya Prada for Jaya Prada Special.
20	Manoj Muntashir for Maa Special.
21	Dharmendra for Dharmendra Special.
22	Hema Malini and Esha Deol for Dream Gril with Dhoom Girl.
23	Mithali Raj and Taapsee Pannu to promote their upcoming film Shabaash Mithu and for Bharat ki Betiyaan.
24	Mahesh Bhatt and Vikram Bhatt to promote their upcoming film Judaa Hoke Bhi and for Bhatt Special.
25	Arjun Kapoor and Disha Patani to promote their upcoming film Ek Villain Returns and Manoj Muntashir for Father’s Special.
26	Anandji Virji Shah to Celebrate Evergreen Songs Special.
27	Super Sangam Special - Archana Puran Singh with all contestants of India's Laughter Champion.
28	Helen and Aruna Irani to celebrate Helen ji and Aruna ji Special.
30	Padmini Kolhapure and Poonam Dhillon to Celebrate Friendship Day Special.
31	Akshay Kumar and Anand L. Rai to promote their upcoming film Raksha Bandhan and Nihal Tauro as a special surprise captain replacement for Salman Ali and to celebrate Raksha Bandhan Special.
33	Asha Parekh for Asha Parekh Special.
34	Manoj Muntashir for Ajadi Ka Amrit Mohotsav Independence Day Special.
35	Reena Roy for Reena Roy Special.
36	Neha Kakkar to promote Indian Idol 13 for Indian Idol Special.
37	Govinda and Satish Kaushik for Govinda and Sarish Kaushik Special and to support the contestants for the Semi-Finale week and take off all of their worries for the Grand Finale.
39	Shivam Singh, Bidipta Chakraborty & Sanchari Sengupta to perform as contestants and promote Indian Idol 13. Anandji Virji Shah, Bharti Singh, Haarsh Limbachiyaa, Sonu Kakkar, Bhoomi Trivedi, Padmini Kolhapure, Poonam Dhillon and Shabbir Kumar to present the Superstar Awards and support the contestants at the Grand Finale.

=== Season 3 ===
Episode	Guests
3	Shreyas Puranik in Final Audition.
5 & 6	Rohanpreet Singh to co-host with Haarsh Limbachiyaa on the Top 15 Janm Utsav (Grand Premiere) episodes only.
6	Arjun Singh as a challenger to replace one of the contestants (Shantanu) from Team Danish in the competition.
8	Pyarelal Ramprasad Sharma and his wife Sunila Sharma to Celebrate The Greatest Duets Weekend & Laxmikant-Pyarelal Special.
10	Anandji Virji Shah and his wife Shanta Ben Shah to Celebrate Kalyanji-Anandji Special.
12	Vidya Balan & Pratik Gandhi to promote their film "Do Aur Do Pyaar and Celebrate Shreemati Special.
13	Sanju Rathod to promote his song "Gulabi Sadi" in Vivah Special
14	Abhijeet Bhattacharya & Anuradha Paudwal to Celebrate Nadeem–Shravan Special.
15	Mohammad Faiz (Superstar Singer Season 2 Winner) to sing with Shubh in the Summer Holiday Special.
17	Meenakshi Seshadri to Celebrate Indian Folk Music and Dev Joshi to promote his upcoming show "Baalveer Season 4".
18	Haarsh Limbachiyaa's mother Rita Limbachiyaa on the episode of Thank you Maa.
19	Janhvi Kapoor & Mohammad Faiz to promote their upcoming film "Mr. & Mrs. Mahi" and along with Richa Sharma for Qawwali Night.
20	Sudesh Bhosale for A to Z of Kishore Kumar Songs Special.
21	Manoj Muntashir, Santosh Anand, Sairam Iyer for Lata Night.
22	Manoj Muntashir, Raza Murad, Shabbir Kumar, Vineet Singh for Rafi Night and Sayli Salunkhe to promote her upcoming show "Pukaar Dil Se Dil Tak".
23	Divya Khosla Kumar to promote her upcomig film "Savi" and Digvijay Singh Pariyar to promote his Coke Studio Bharat's song "Sonchadi" in Second Innings Special.
24	Udit Narayan and his wife Deepa Narayan Jha for Udit Narayan's Masterclass.
25	Sonu Kakkar, Tony Kakkar, Rohanpreet Singh and Neha's parents to celebrate Super Judge Neha's Birthday Bash Party.
27	Talat Aziz & Anup Jalota for Ghazal Night.
30	Madhoo Shah & Bhagyashree Patwardhan to celebrate the Era of Bhagyashree and Madhoo.
31 & 32	Hemant Brijwasi as a captain replacement for Salman Ali on those episodes only.
32	Geeta Kapoor, Terence Lewis to promote their upcoming show India's Best Dancer 4 for Girls V/S Boys.
33	Sukhwinder Singh to give the contestants a challenge to attempt and celebrate Sukhwinder Singh Special.
34	Steve Jyrwa, Sushmita Mistry & Aditya Malviya to perform as contestants and promote India's Best Dancer 4 and Manisha Rani for Epic Songs of India.
35	Ammy Virk & Vicky Kaushal to promote their upcoming film "Bad Newz" and celebrate Namaste 90s.
36	Kumar Sanu to celebrate Namaste 90s with Kumar Sanu.
38	Manoj Muntashir for Kahaani Rajesh Khanna Ki.
39	Viju Shah for Semi Finale Weekend.
40	Zakir Khan to promote his upcoming show "Aapka Apna Zakir" in Semi Finale Weekend.
41 & 42	Kailash Kher, Meet Bros, Sadhana Sargam, Pooja Batra, Deepak Pandit, Rishi Singh on Future Ka Finale.
