= India's Best Dancer (Hindi TV series) season 1 =

India's Best Dancer
- Season 1
- Hosted by: Haarsh Limbachiyaa; Bharti Singh
- Judges: Geeta Kapoor; Terence Lewis; Malaika Arora
- No. of contestants: 13
- Winner: Tiger Pop
- Winning mentor: Vartika Jha
- Runner-up: Mukul Gain
- No. of episodes: 48

Release
- Original network: Sony TV
- Original release: 29 February – 22 November 2020

Season chronology
- Next → Season 2

India's Best Dancer 1 is the first season of the Indian reality TV series India's Best Dancer. It premiered on 29 February 2020 on Sony Entertainment Television and Sony Entertainment Television Asia. This season was hosted by Haarsh Limbachiyaa and Bharti Singh. The Grand Finale was aired on 22 November 2020 and the winner was Tiger Pop.
Contestant Sadhwi Majumdar later appeared as a Choreographer in India's Best Dancer (Season 2) and Contestants Swetha Warrier, Subhranil Paul and Paramdeep Singh appeared as Choreographers in India's Best Dancer (Season 3) and Subhranil Paul appeared as Choreographer in India's Best Dancer (Season 4) also.

== Top 13 Contestants ==
India's Best Dancer Top 13
Contestants	City	Choreographers	Status	Place
Tiger Pop	Gurugram	Vartika Jha	Winner; 14 November 2020	1st
Mukul Gain	Raipur	Pratik Utekar	1st Runner-up; 22 November 2020	2nd
Swetha Warrier	Kerala	Aishwarya Radhakrishnan	2nd Runner-up; 22 November 2020	3rd
Swetha Warrier	Kerala	Bhawna Khanduja	2nd Runner-up; 22 November 2020	3rd
Shubhranil Paul	Siliguri	Pankaj Thapa	3rd Runner-up; 22 November 2020	4th
Paramdeep Singh	Uttar Pradesh	Anuradha Iyenagar	Eliminated; 16 August 2020	5th
Paramdeep Singh	Uttar Pradesh	Anuradha Iyenagar	4th Runner-up; 22 November 2020	5th
Adnan Ahmed Khan	Assam	Sushant Khatri	Eliminated; 14 November 2020	6th
Adnan Ahmed Khan	Assam	Noel Alexander	Eliminated; 14 November 2020	6th
Aman Shah	Rishikesh	Sagar Bora	Eliminated; 14 November 2020	6th
Rutuja Junnarkar	Pune	Ashish Patil	Eliminated; 14 November 2020	6th
Md. Akib	West Midnapore	Paul Marshal	Eliminated; 14 November 2020	6th
Raj Sharma	Gwalior	Vaibhav Ghuge	Eliminated; 14 November 2020	6th
Sonal Vichare	Mumbai	Tushar Shetty	Eliminated; 14 November 2020	6th
Sadhwi Majumdar	Agartala	Himanshu Parihar	Eliminated; 23 August 2020	12th
Himanshi Gurheriya	Haryana	Rishabh Sharma	Eliminated; 26 July 2020	13th
Himanshi Gurheriya	Haryana	Amardeep Singh Natt	Eliminated; 26 July 2020	13th

== Episodes ==
No. overall	No. in season	Title	Length (minutes)	Original release date	Episode link
1	1	"Dancers Rock the Inauguration"	75 Minutes	29 February 2020	Episode 1
After an exciting and competitive round of auditions, 'India's Best Dancer' finally takes off with a bang, and amazing performances impress the judges, and some stories melt their hearts.
2	2	"Suraj’s Shining Moments"	75 Minutes	1 March 2020	Episode 2
Dancers from all over InIndi, audition for the India's Best Dancer but only few of them go into the next round. Watch this episode to experience various dance performances along with Suraj's shining moments.
3	3	"Tiger Pop’s Dream Come True"	78 Minutes	7 March 2020	Episode 3
90 seconds is all that is there is for the contestants to impress the judges. Who will get selected, and who will return home? Let's watch.
4	4	"The Selection Turns Tough"	78 Minutes	8 March 2020	Episode 4
India's-Best-Dancer It's the last day of the selection round, and the last chance for the contestants, let's see what happens?
5	5	"Sadhwi And Rutuja In ‘Top 12’"	79 Minutes	14 March 2020	Episode 5
India's-Best-Dancer The dance off battle starts between the contestants. Who will make it to 'Top 12'? Let's watch now
6	6	"Who Will Be The Final 'Top 12'?"	77 Minutes	15 March 2020	Episode 6
India's-Best-Dancer It's the final round of the mega auditions, where the judges will decide the final contestants for 'Top 12'. Who will get selected?
7	7	"The Grand Premiere"	46 Minutes	21 March 2020	Episode 7
India's-Best-Dancer The grand premiere starts with some dazzling performances on the stage. Don't miss it!!
8	8	"Contestants Dazzle At The Grand Premiere"	57 Minutes	22 March 2020	Episode 8
India's-Best-Dancer Power-packed performances continue to take our breath away on India's Best Dancer Grand Premiere. Miss it NOT!
9	9	"The Judges Are Super Impressed"	41 Minutes	28 March 2020	TBA
10	10	"Everlasting Grand Premiere"	45 Minutes	29 March 2020	TBA
11	11	"God of Dance"	76 Minutes	18 July 2020	TBA
12	12	"Express With Some Moves"	82 Minutes	19 July 2020	TBA
13	13	"Good Old Bollywood"	81 Minutes	25 July 2020	TBA
14	14	"First Step To Success!"	81 Minutes	26 July 2020	TBA
15	15	"The Celebrations Are On!"	75 Minutes	1 August 2020	TBA
16	16	"A Second Chance?"	75 Minutes	2 August 2020	TBA
17	17	"Better Than Before"	79 Minutes	8 August 2020	TBA
18	18	"The Path Gets Tougher!"	72 Minutes	9 August 2020	TBA
19	19	"Celebrating India’s Freedom"	80 Minutes	15 August 2020	TBA
20	20	"Entertainment Unlimited"	72 Minutes	16 August 2020	TBA
21	21	"Ganesh Mahotsav Begins!"	76 Minutes	22 August 2020	TBA
22	22	"Dance Ka Complete Package"	76 Minutes	23 August 2020	TBA
23	23	"Nora And Secrets"	73 Minutes	29 August 2020	TBA
24	24	"Dilbar Nora Is Fully Fida!"	73 Minutes	30 August 2020	TBA
25	25	"Adlaa Badli Ka Hungama"	76 Minutes	5 September 2020	TBA
26	26	"Raghav And Shakti’s Dance Tadka"	74 Minutes	6 September 2020	TBA
27	27	"Shotgun Sinha On India’s Best Dancer"	73 Minutes	12 September 2020	TBA
28	28	"A Romantic Ambience On India’s Best Dancer"	65 Minutes	13 September 2020	TBA
29	29	"Arun-Dipika Spread Bhakti Ki Lahar"	76 Minutes	19 September 2020	TBA
30	30	"Retro Special With Neha-Sunny"	70 Minutes	20 September 2020	TBA
31	31	"The Dance Express With Chunky And Shakti"	76 Minutes	26 September 2020	TBA
32	32	"Bad Man Meets Crime Master Gogo"	71 Minutes	27 September 2020	TBA
33	33	"India’s Best Dancer X Super Dancer"	71 Minutes	3 October 2020	TBA
34	34	"Goodbye, Sweet Nora"	74 Minutes	4 October 2020	TBA
35	35	"Dashing Guru, Divalicious Dhvani"	73 Minutes	10 October 2020	TBA
36	36	"The Folk Funk With Ila Arun"	72 Minutes	11 October 2020	TBA
37	37	"Farah Says - Lights, Camera, Romance!"	74 Minutes	17 October 2020	TBA
38	38	"Romance Extravaganza With Farah"	61 Minutes	18 October 2020	TBA
39	39	"A Glittering Night With RajKummar-Nushrratt"	68 Minutes	24 October 2020	TBA
40	40	"Dazzling Dussehra With Nora"	71 Minutes	25 October 2020	TBA
41	41	"Entertainment Bonanza With Taarak Team"	72 Minutes	31 October 2020	TBA
42	42	"Dance Mania With Taarak Mehta Team"	72 Minutes	1 November 2020	TBA
43	43	"Ek Shaam Remo Ke Naam"	75 Minutes	7 November 2020	TBA
44	44	"Sudha Chandran Adds Chaar Chaand"	79 Minutes	8 November 2020	TBA
45	45	"Welcome The Best Five!"	76 Minutes	14 November 2020	TBA
46	46	"Bedazzling Diwali With Himesh-Vishal"	94 Minutes	15 November 2020	TBA
47	47	"The Eve Of Grand Finale"	70 Minutes	21 November 2020	TBA
48	48	"The Glittering Grand Finale"	228 Minutes	22 November 2020	TBA

== Scoring Chart ==
Contestants	Choreographers	Grand Opening	Week 1	Week 2	Week 3	Week 4	Week 5	Week 6	Week 7	Week 8-11	Week 12	Week 13	Week 19	Week 15	Week 16	Week 17	Week 18		GRAND FINALE	
Contestants	Choreographers	21–29 March	18–19 July	25–26 July	1–4 August	8–9 August	15–16 August	22–23 August	29–30 August	5-27 September	3–4 October	10–11 October	17–18 October	24–25 October	31 October – 1 November	7–8 November	14–15 November		21–22 November	
Total Score		No Points Given		30						No Points Given	30						No Points Given			
Tiger Pop	Vartika	Advanced to Top 13	No Points Given	30	30	30	30	30	28	No Points Given	30	28	Finalist						Winner	
Mukul	Pratik	Advanced to Top 13	No Points Given	22	29	30	30	23	29	No Points Given	30	29	30	28	30	Finalist			1st Runner-Up	
Swetha	Bhawna	Advanced to Top 13	No Points Given	30	30	24	29	30	28	No Points Given	30	30	27	30	30	30	Finalist		2nd Runner-Up	
Subhranil	Pankaj	Advanced to Top 13	No Points Given	30	30	30	30	23	27	No Points Given	30	30	28	Finalist					3rd Runner-Up	
Paramdeep	Anuradha	Advanced to Top 13	No Points Given	27	30	22	Eliminated (Week 4)			No Points Given	30	30	30	30	30	30	Finalist		4th Runner-Up	
Adnan	Noel	Advanced to Top 13	No Points Given	24	30	30	23	30	NP	No Points Given	22	23	30	24	30	27	Eliminated (Week 18)			
Akib	Paul	Advanced to Top 13	No Points Given	30	24	25	30	21	NP	No Points Given	27	30	24	24	27	30	Eliminated (Week 18)			
Aman	Sagar	WILD CARD								No Points Given	29	24	25	30	30	27	Eliminated (Week 18)			
Raj	Vaibhav	Advanced to Top 13	No Points Given	24	23	28	NP	30	28	No Points Given	22	30	25	30	24	22	Eliminated (Week 18)			
Rutuja	Ashish	Advanced to Top 13	No Points Given	28	27	30	30	30	25	No Points Given	30	30	29	30	30	22	Eliminated (Week 18)			
Sonal	Tushar	Advanced to Top 13	No Points Given	30	29	26	22	30	24	No Points Given	30	27	28	26	26	27	Eliminated (Week 18)			
Sadhwi	Himanshu	Advanced to Top 13	No Points Given	23	29	30	30	22	Eliminated (Week 7)											
Himanshi	Rishabh	Advanced to Top 13	No Points Given	23	Eliminated (Week 2)															
BTM		None		Himanshi; Mukul; Sadhwi	Raj; Akib	Paramdeep; Swetha	Sonal; Adnan	Akib; Sadhwi	Sonal; Rutuja; Shweta	None							Swetha; Paramdeep; Raj; Adnan; Akib; Rutuja; Sonal; Aman		Tiger Pop; Subhranil; Swetha; Paramdeep; Mukul	
Eliminated		No; Elimination		Himanshi	No; Elimination	Paramdeep	No; Elimination	Sadhwi	No; Elimination								Rutuja	Raj	Paramdeep	Subhranil
Eliminated		No; Elimination		Himanshi	No; Elimination	Paramdeep	No; Elimination	Sadhwi	No; Elimination								Sonal	Adnan	Swetha	Mukul
Eliminated		No; Elimination		Himanshi	No; Elimination	Paramdeep	No; Elimination	Sadhwi	No; Elimination								Aman	Akib	Tiger Pop	

== Guests ==
- Special Appearance states that the guest didn't come for any promotion or the episode didn't have any theme.

Date	Guest	Featured	Ref(s)
18–19 July	Remo D'Souza	Special Appearance	
8–9 August	Dharmesh Yelande	Special Appearance	
15–16 August	Sonu Sood	Azaadi Special	
22–23 August	Sachin Pilgaonkar and Supriya Pilgaonkar	Ganesh Chaturthi Special	
29–30 August	Nora Fatehi	Promotion Of Song Pachtaoge (Female Version)	
5–6 September	Raghav Juyal and Shakti Mohan	Choreographer Swap Week (Adla Badli) Special + Wild Card Special	
12 September	Shatrughan Sinha and Poonam Sinha	Thank You Special	
13 September	Varun Badola, Shweta Tiwari, Anjali Tatrari, Salman Yusuff Khan and Zaara Yesmin	Shaadi Special	
19 September	Arun Govil and Dipika Chikhlia	Mythology Special	
20 September	Neha Kakkar and Sunny Kaushal	Retro Special + Promotion Of Song Taaron Ke Shehar	
26 September	Shakti Kapoor and Chunky Pandey	Comedy Special	
27 September	Gulshan Grover and Shakti Kapoor	Villain Special	
3–4 October	Ex-contestants of Super Dancer	India's Best Dancer × Super Dancer Special	
10 October	Guru Randhawa and Dhvani Bhanushali	Promotion of song Baby Girl + Folk Fusion Special	
11 October	Ila Arun	Folk Fusion Special	
17 October	Farah Khan	Romance Special	
18 October	Farah Khan, Divya Khosla Kumar and Darshan Raval	Singers came for the promotion of the song Teri Aankhon Mein + Romance Special	
24 October	Rajkumar Rao and Nushrat Bharucha	Promotion of film Chhalaang	
25 October	Nora Fatehi	Promotion of song Naach Meri Rani	
31 October – 1 November	Cast of the show Taarak Mehta Ka Ooltah Chashmah	IBD × TMKOC Special + Celebrating 3000 episodes of TMKOC	
7 November	Remo D'Souza, Punit Pathak, Salman Yusuff Khan, Abhinav, Sushant Pujari and Rahul Shetty	Judges Challenge Special-I and to promote Log Kya Kahenge song.	
8 November	Sudha Chandran and Tulsi Kumar	Judges Challenge Special-II	
15 November	Himesh Reshamiya, Vishal Dadlani and Aditya Narayan	To promote Indian Idol 12 + Diwali Special	
22 November	Raghav Juyal, Dharmesh Yelande, Krushna Abhishek and Pooja Sawant	Grand Finale	
