= Dance Plus season 6 =

Indian dance reality show

Dance Plus
- Season 6
- Hosted by: Raghav Juyal
- Judges: Remo D'Souza
- Coaches: Salman Yusuff Khan; Punit Pathak; Shakti Mohan
- No. of contestants: 15
- Winners: Harsh, Sneha and Tejas
- Winning mentor: Shakti Mohan
- Runner-up: Dhananjay Joshi

Release
- Original network: Disney+ Hotstar; Star Plus
- Original release: Disney+Hotstar: September 14 – 15 October 2021; StarPlus: 31 October 2021 – 16 January 2022

Season chronology
- ← Previous; Season 5 Next → Season 7

Dance Plus 6 is the sixth season of reality show tag line haar ko Jeet lo Dance Plus that premiered on 14 September 2021 on Disney+ Hotstar and streamed weekdays until 15 October 2021. It later premiered on Star Plus on 31 October 2021 and aired Every Sunday Night until 16 January 2022. It is produced by Urban Brew Studios in association with Frames Productions.

This season is judged by Remo D'Souza, its captains were Salman Yusuff Khan, Punit Pathak and Shakti Mohan, and it was hosted by Raghav Juyal.

== Super judge and captains ==
Remo D'Souza, the super judge, is an Indian dancer, choreographer, actor and film director.

The following are the three captains of this season

- Shakti Mohan
- Punit Pathak
- Salman Yusuff Khan

== Teams ==
Contestant info

Teams color key
Winner
Runner-up
Third place
Eliminated in Race to Top 6
Eliminated in Semi Finale

Captains	Top 15				
Punit	Kuldeep and Pranshu	Pratik Surve	Romsha Singh	Shivanshu Soni	Hot Indians Crew
Shakti	Harsh, Tejas, Sneha	Dhananjay Joshi	Shweta Sharda	PS2	J.S Angels
Salman	Rohan Parkale	Ajay and Sara	Tom and Jerry	MD Hasan Raja	N House Crew

=== Dance styles of teams ===
Sr.	Artists	Type	Style	Team
1	Shivanshu Soni	Solo	Ballet, Classical, Popping, and Animation	Punit
2	Kuldeep and Pranshu	Duo	Lyrical	Punit
3	Romsha Singh	Solo	Hip-Hop & Contemporary	Punit
4	Hot Indians Crew	Group	Urban Choreography	Punit
5	Pratik Surve	Solo	Contemporary	Punit
6	J.S Angels	Group	Bharatnatyam	Shakti
7	Dhananjay Joshi	Solo	Lyrical	Shakti
8	PS2	Trio	Animation	Shakti
9	Shweta Sharda	Solo	Popping & Hip-Hop	Shakti
10	Harsh, Tejas and Sneha	Trio	Contemporary	Shakti
11	Ajay and Sara	Duo	Freestyle	Salman
12	Rohan Parkale	Solo	Lyrical and Animation	Salman
13	Tom and Jerry	Duo	Vernacular/Street dance	Salman
14	MD Hassan Raja	Solo	Contemporary and B-Boying	Salman
15	N House Crew	Group	Lyrical	Salman

== Semi-finalists (Top 6) ==
Sr.	Artists	Type	Style	Team
1	Pratik Surve	Solo	Contemporary	Punit
2	Romsha Singh	Solo	Hip-Hop & Contemporary	Punit
3	Kuldeep and Pranshu	Duo	Lyrical	Punit
4	Dhananjay Joshi	Solo	Lyrical	Shakti
5	Harsh, Tejas and Sneha	Trio	Contemporary	Shakti
6	Rohan Parkale	Solo	Lyrical and Animation	Salman

== Finalists (Top 3) ==
Sr.	Artists	Type	Style	Team	Finish
1	Harsh, Tejas & Sneha	Trio	Contemporary	Shakti	Winner
2	Dhananjay Joshi	Solo	Lyrical	Shakti	1st Runner-up
3	Kuldeep & Pranshu	Duo	Lyrical	Punit	2nd Runner-up

== Winner of weekly Battle Plus of captains ==
From Dance Plus season 6, D'Souza added a new challenge for captains. Here Remo introduced a dance icon challenge with the winning team getting a new trophy called as Battle Plus. The winning team gets a chance to perform/battle in the final showdown.

Episode	Captain	Total Battle Plus
6-8	Shakti Mohan	01
11-13	Punit Pathak	02
16-18	Punit Pathak	02

== Special guests ==
=== Through direct contact ===
Sr.	Guest(s)	Episode	Reason
1	Prabhu Deva	20-22 September	To Give Challenges To Contestants
2	Badshah	23-24 September	To Promote His New Album Bad Boy x Bad Girl
3	Neeraj Chopra	27-28 September	Special Appearance
4	V Unbeatable	28 September	Special performance
5	Yami Gautam	30 September	To promote their film Bhoot Police
5	Jacqueline Fernandez, Arjun Kapoor	30 September - 1 October	To promote their film Bhoot Police
6	Mithun Chakraborty	4-6 October	To Give Challenges To Contestants
7	Sugandha Mishra	9-11 October	Guest Host
8	Poppin Ticko, Sushant Khatri, Amardeep Singh Natt, Chetan Salunkhe, Vartika Jha (Ex-contestants of Dance+)	14 October	Remo's Plus Panel in Semi-finale
9	Farah Khan	15 October	Special appearance
9	Kriti Sanon	15 October	To promote her film Hum Do Hamare Do
9	Ayesha Singh, Neil Bhatt and Aishwarya Sharma	15 October	as Sai, Virat and Patralekha from Ghum Hai Kisikey Pyaar Meiin

=== Through video conferencing ===
Sr.	Guest(s)	Reason	Episode
1	Terence Lewis	To support Pratik Surve	22 September
2	Terence Lewis	To introduce Pratik Surve's act in Semi-finale	14 October

== Score chart ==
Captain's info

- Team Punit
- Team Shakti
- Team Salman

Contestant info

Position color key
Winner
Runner-up
Third place
Eliminated in Race to Top 3
Advanced to Top 6
Eliminated in Race to 6
Eliminated in Semi Finale
Advanced to Top 30 in Auditions
Advanced to Top 15 in Mega Auditions
Finalist
Not Performed

- (P) Captain Punit's challenge
- (S) Captain Shakti's challenge
- (SL) Captain Salman's challenge
- (FC) Fan's Challenge Round
- (MD) Mithun Da Challenge Round
- (DI) Dance Icon Round
- (IS) International Squad Round
- (SD) Final Showdown
- (B) Bonus battle
- (50 score) actual score (40)+ double plus score (10) = 50 points

The scores were given in the following manner:
1. A captain can score out of 10 and Super Judge Remo can score out of 20. Remo also had the power to give double plus to the team and the team got additional 10 points.
2. From season 6, D'Souza added a new challenge for captains. Here Remo introduced a dance icon challenge with the winning team getting a new trophy called as Battle Plus. The winning team gets a chance to perform/battle in the final showdown along with top two teams from Captain's challenge round.
3. Second Round is Captain's challenge round. Each captain gave a challenge. One performer from each team performed. Top two scoring teams go for final showdown and performed with winning team of Battle Plus.
4. One performer from each team in final showdown performed. The winner of final showdown is decided by Remo. The team whose artist won the final showdown is the winner of that week.
5. Winning captain chose two performers from their team to advance as Finalists and Remo chose amongst them.

Results by weekScores out of 10/20/30/40/50/60
Contestants	Audition (Top 30)	Audition (Top 15)	Grand Opening	Race to Top 6						Semi Finale	Finale
Episodes	1-3	4-5	6-8	9-10	11-13	14-15	16-18	19-20	21-23	24	25
Total Score			60	40							
Harsh, Tejas, Sneha	Advanced to Top 30	Advanced to Top 15	60	NP	37 (FC)	37 (P)	NP	W (SD)	Advanced to Top 6	Secret scores given by Plus Panel and Remo	Winner
Dhananjay Joshi	Advanced to Top 30	Advanced to Top 15	60	40 (SL)	37 (FC)	50 (SL)	36 (MD)	40 (P)	Advanced to Top 6	Secret scores given by Plus Panel and Remo	1st Runner-up
Kuldeep and Pranshu	Advanced to Top 30	Advanced to Top 15	58	W (SD)	NP	50 (SL)	40 (MD)	40 (S)	Advanced to Top 6	Secret scores given by Plus Panel and Remo	2nd Runner-up
Pratik Surve	Advanced to Top 30	Advanced to Top 15	56	40 (S)	35 (FC)	W (SD)	NP	40 (P)	Advanced to Top 6	Secret scores given by Plus Panel and Remo	Eliminated in Race to Top 3
Romsha Singh	Advanced to Top 30	Advanced to Top 15	NP	40 (SL)	39 (FC)	37 (P)	36 (MD)	50 (SL)	Advanced to Top 6	Secret scores given by Plus Panel and Remo	Eliminated in Race to Top 3
Rohan Parkale	Advanced to Top 30	Advanced to Top 15	NP	38 (S)	36 (FC)	35 (S)	36 (MD)	40 (SL)	Advanced to Top 6	Secret scores given by Plus Panel and Remo	Eliminated in Race to Top 3
Shivanshu Soni	Advanced to Top 30	Advanced to Top 15	56	38 (P)	38 (FC)	NP	34 (MD)	L (SD)	Eliminated		
Hot Indians Crew	Advanced to Top 30	Advanced to Top 15	54	NP	40 (FC)	39 (S)	38 (MD)	NP	Eliminated		
J.S Angels	Advanced to Top 30	Advanced to Top 15	58	L (SD)	NP	NP	35 (MD)	35 (S)	Eliminated		
Shweta Sharda	Advanced to Top 30	Advanced to Top 15	NP	37 (P)	37 (FC)	34 (S)	38 (MD)	NP	Eliminated		
PS2	Advanced to Top 30	Advanced to Top 15	56	36 (S)	34 (FC)	L (SD)	36 (MD)	50 (SL)	Eliminated		
Ajay and Sara	Advanced to Top 30	Advanced to Top 15	56	38 (P)	36 (FC)	NP	36 (MD)	40 (P)	Eliminated		
N House Crew	Advanced to Top 30	Advanced to Top 15	54	NP	38 (FC)	NP	37 (MD)	NP	Eliminated		
Tom and Jerry	Advanced to Top 30	Advanced to Top 15	54	50 (SL)	NP	34 (P)	34 (MD)	NP	Eliminated		
MD Hasan Raja	Advanced to Top 30	Advanced to Top 15	55	L (SD)	33 (FC)	50 (SL)	NP	40 (S)	Eliminated		

== Winners of weekly final showdowns ==
Sr.	Contestant	Team
1	Kuldeep & Pranshu	Punit
2	Pratik Surve	Punit
3	Harsh, Tejas and Sneha	Shakti
