= DID Super Moms season 3 =

DID Super Moms
- Season 3
- Hosted by: Jay Bhanushali
- Judges: Remo D'Souza; Urmila Matondkar; Bhagyashree
- No. of contestants: 12
- Winner: Varsha Bumra
- Winning mentor: Vartika Jha
- Runner-up: Sadhna Mishra
- No. of episodes: 26

Release
- Original network: Zee TV
- Original release: 2 July – 25 September 2022

Season chronology
- ← Previous; Season 2

DID Super Moms 3 is the third season of the Indian Hindi-language dance reality television series DID Super Moms. It was premiered on 2 July 2022 on Zee TV. Hosted by Jay Bhanushali. This season Judged by Remo D'Souza, Bhagyashree and Urmila Matondkar. The Grand Finale was broadcast on 25 September 2022 and the winner was Varsha Bumra.

== Production ==
Season 3 began on 2 July 2022 as scheduled. On 25 May 2022, a promo was released on Zee TV's social media platforms. This show provided a platform to prove their mettle, and witness the stories and the resolution of the Super Moms to showcase their talent. The show is hosted and presented by Jay Bhanushali.

== Super gurus ==
- Anuradha Iyengar
- Ashish Patil
- Bharat Ghare
- Bhawana Khanduja
- Kumar Sharma
- Shayam Yadav
- Shweta Warrier
- Roza Rana
- Rutuja Junarkar
- Vaibhav Gughe
- Vartika Jha
- Vivek Chechare

== Top 12 Super Moms ==
Sr.	Super Moms	City	Choreographers	Date of Elimination	Status
1	Varsha Bumra	Haryana	Vartika Jha	Finalists	Winner
2	Sadhna Mishra	Madhya Pradesh	Bharat Ghare	Finalists	1st Runner-up
3	Sadika Khan Shaikh	Maharashtra	Vivek Chachere	Finalists	2nd Runner-up
4	Anila Rajan	Chhattisgarh	Swetha Warrier	Finalists	3rd Runner-up
5	Riddhi Tiwari	Uttar Pradesh	Shyam Yadav	Finalists	4th Runner up
6	Alpana Pandey	Lucknow	Vaibhav Ghuge	Finalists	5th Runner up
7	Babli Bhattacharjee	Guwahati	Rutuja Junnarkar	4 September 2022	Eliminated
8	Khyati Gupta	Delhi	Ashish Patil	4 September 2022	Eliminated
9	Deepika Shetty	Maharashtra	Bhawna Khanduja	28 August 2022	Eliminated
10	Deepthi Dassan	Kerala	Anuradha Iyengar	28 August 2022	Eliminated
11	Seemrit Kaur Khosla	Rajasthan	Kumar Sharma	21 August 2022	Eliminated
12	Riya Bhattacharjee	West Bengal	Roza Rana	21 August 2022	Eliminated

== Guest ==
Guest name	Episode No.	Date	Notes
Badshah	9	30 July 2022	
Janhvi Kapoor	11	6 August 2022	To promote her film Good Luck Jerry
Govinda	13	13 August 2022	
Vijay Deverakonda & Ananya Panday	16	21 August 2022	To promote their film Liger
Shakti Kapoor & Chunky Panday	17	28 August 2022	
Ankita Lokhande & Usha Nadkarni	19	3 September 2022	Pavitra Rishta Special
Kumar Sanu & Anu Malik	21	10 September 2022	Maha Musical Weekend
Kumar Sanu & Mika Singh	22	11 September 2022	Maha Musical Weekend continues
Punit Pathak & Sunny Leone	22	11 September 2022	To promote "Nach Baby" dance number, featuring Remo D'Souza with Punit & Sunny
Bosco Martis & five child artists from the movie Rocket Gang	24	18 September 2022	To promote Rocket Gang. Bosco's mother also came.
Aparshakti Khurana & Khushalii Kumar	25	24 September 2022	To promote Dhokha: Round D Corner movie
Govinda	26	25 September 2022	Sapno ka Grand Finale special guest
Rashmika Mandanna & Neena Gupta	26	25 September 2022	To promote Goodbye movie

== See also ==
- Dance India Dance
- Dance Plus
