= Frames Production =

Indian production company

Frames Productions
- Type: Private
- Industry: Entertainment
- Genre: Entertainment
- Founded: 2011; 15 years ago in Mumbai, Maharashtra, India
- Founder: Hemant Ruprell; Ranjeet Thakur
- Headquarters: Mumbai, Maharashtra, India
- Area served: India
- Key people: Hemant Ruprell; Ranjeet Thakur
- Products: Television programs
- Website: www.frames.net.in

Frames Production is an Indian production company which produces Indian soap operas, entertainment, reality shows and factual programming on Indian television. Frames is one of the top TV serial production houses in Mumbai.

== Current productions ==
Premiere date	Show	Channel	Notes
27 January 2026	Wheel of Fortune India	Sony Entertainment Television	Gameshow
13 April 2026	Deep Jyoti	Zee Marathi	Drama Series
15 June 2026	Suna Yeti Ghara	Star Pravah	Drama Series

== Former productions ==
Year	Show	Network	Notes
2011	Neethone Dance	Star Maa	Telugu celebrity dance reality show
2012	Great Music Gurukul	Colors Bangla	Bengali music reality show
2012	Abbulish	Colors Bangla	Bengali celebrity game show
2012	Mrs. Annapurna	Colors Marathi	Marathi cookery reality show
2012	Bindass Dance	Colors Bangla	Bengali dance reality show
2012	MAD - Maharashtracha Assal Dancer	Colors Marathi	Marathi dance reality show
2011–2012	DID Li'l Masters (season 2)	Zee TV	Dance reality show
2012	Dance Ke Superkids	Zee TV	Dance reality show
2013	Dance India Dance (season 3)	Zee TV	Dance reality show
2012–2013	Nach Baliye (season 5)	Star Plus	Dance reality show
2013	Nach Baliye Shriman vs Shrimati	Star Plus	Dance reality show
2013	India's Best Dramebaaz	Zee TV	Talent hunt reality show
2013–2014	Nach Baliye (season 6)	Star Plus	Dance reality show
2015	Dance Plus	Star Plus	Dance reality show
2015	Shukriya	Star Plus	Reality show
2016	Dance Plus season 2	Star Plus	Dance reality show
2016	Super Dancer	Sony Entertainment Television	Dance reality show
2016–2017	The Kapil Sharma Show	Sony Entertainment Television	Stand-up comedy talk show
2017	Dil Hai Hindustani	Star Plus	Music reality show
2017	Dance Plus (season 3)	Star Plus	Dance reality show
2017	Dance Dance Juniors	Star Suvarna	Kannada dance reality show
2013	Dance Maharashtra Dance	Zee Marathi	Marathi dance reality show
2017	Dance Champions	Star Plus	Dance reality show
2017	Sabse Bada Kalakar	Sony Entertainment Television	Reality show
2017–2018	The Drama Company	Sony Entertainment Television	Stand-up comedy
2017–2018	High Fever – Dance Ka Naya Tevar	& TV	Dance reality show
2017–2018	Super Dancer Chapter 2	Sony Entertainment Television	Dance reality show
2017–2019	Sangeet Samrat	Zee Yuva	Marathi music reality Show
2018	Jio Dhan Dhana Dhan	Colors TV	Cricket comedy show
2018	Family Time With Kapil Sharma	Sony Entertainment Television	Stand-up comedy Talk show
2018	Dance Maharashtra Dance (season 2)	Zee Yuva	Marathi dance reality show
2018	Maharashtracha Favourite Dancer	Sony Marathi	Marathi dance reality show
2018	Super Dancer Maharashtra	Sony Marathi	Marathi dance reality show
2018	Dance Plus (season 4)	Star Plus	Dance reality show
2018	Dil Hai Hindustani (season 2)	Star Plus	Music reality show
2018–2019	Kanpur Wale Khuranas	Star Plus	Stand-up comedy
2019	Super Dancer Chapter 3	Sony Entertainment Television	Dance reality show
2019	Superstar Singer	Sony Entertainment Television	Live singing reality show
2019	Back Benchers	Flipkart Originals	Non-fiction web show
2019	Dance Plus (season 5)	Star Plus	Dance reality show
2020	India's Best Dancer (Hindi TV series) season 1	Sony Entertainment Television	Dance reality show
2020–2021	Maharashtra's Best Dancer	Sony Marathi	Marathi dance reality show
2021	Dance Plus (season 6)	Star Plus	Dance reality show
2021	Super Dancer Chapter 4	Sony Entertainment Television	Dance reality show
2021–2022	India's Best Dancer season 2	Sony Entertainment Television	Dance reality show
2023	India's Best Dancer (Hindi TV series) season 3	Sony Entertainment Television	Dance reality show
2020–2023	Sahkutumb Sahparivar	Star Pravah	Drama series
2021–2023	Swabhiman – Shodh Astitvacha	Star Pravah	Drama series
2021–2026	Mi Honar Superstar	Star Pravah	Reality Show
2022–2023	Ajooni	Star Bharat	Drama series
2023	Hip Hop India	Amazon Mini TV	under ground hip hop dance reality show
2023–2024	Dance Plus Pro	Star Plus	Dance Reality Show
2023–2024	Saara Kahi Tichyasathi	Zee Marathi	Drama series
2023–2025	Lakshmichya Paulanni	Star Pravah	Drama Series
2024–2026	Sadhi Manasa	Star Pravah	Drama Series
