= India's Best Dancer (Hindi TV series) season 2 =

India's Best Dancer
- Season 2
- Hosted by: Manish Paul
- Judges: Geeta Kapoor; Terence Lewis; Malaika Arora
- No. of contestants: 12
- Winner: Saumya Kamble
- Winning mentor: Vartika Jha
- Runner-up: Gourav Sarwan
- No. of episodes: 26

Release
- Original network: Sony TV
- Original release: 16 October 2021 – 9 January 2022

Season chronology
- ← Previous; Season 1 Next → Season 3

India's Best Dancer 2 also known as India's Best Dancer: Best Ka Next Avatar is the second season of the Indian reality TV series India's Best Dancer. It premiered on 16 October 2021 on Sony Entertainment Television. This season hosted by Manish Paul. The Grand Finale was aired on 9 January 2022 and winner was Saumya Kamble, who later appeared as a choreographer in India's Best Dancer (Season 3) along with Raktim Thakuria and Saumya Kamble and Raktim Thakuria appeared as a choreographer in India's Best Dancer (Season 4) also.

== Concept ==
India's Best Dancer will showcase the people of some of the best dancing talent, who with their solo performances, will compete to win the show. In the Grand Premiere, the judges announced the Top 12 contestants who will have a respective mentor in the journey ahead. Week-on-week these 12 contestants will have to impress the judges and audience alike to move closer to winning the most coveted title of India's Best Dancer.

== Top 12 contestants ==
India's Best Dancer Top 12
Contestants	City	Style	Choreographers	Status	Place
Saumya Kamble	Pune	Belly Dance	Vartika Jha	Winner; 9 January 2022	1st
Gourav Sarwan	Jaipur	Popping	Rupesh Soni	1st Runner-up; 9 January 2022	2nd
Roza Rana	Rourkela	Freestyle	Sanam Johar	2nd Runner-up; 9 January 2022	3rd
Raktim Thakuria	Guwahati	Hip-Hop, Lyrical	Aryan Patra	3rd Runner-up; 9 January 2022	4th
Zamroodh	Kerala	Bollywood	Sonali Kar	4th Runner-up; 9 January 2022	5th
Akash Tambedkar	Mumbai	Hip-Hop	Tushar Shetty	Eliminated; 1 January 2022	6th
Dibbay Das	Silchar, Assam	Contemporary	Pankaj Thapa	Eliminated; 1 January 2022	6th
Sanket Gaonkar	Karnataka	Contemporary	Anuradha Iyengar	Eliminated; 1 January 2022	6th
Kanchi Shah	Mumbai	Animation	Paul Marshal	Eliminated; 12 December 2021	9th
Apeksha Sukheja	Ahmedabad	Classical	Sadhwi Majumdar	Eliminated; 12 December 2021	9th
Milind Bhatt	Lucknow	Lyrical	Chandani Srivastava	Eliminated; 5 December 2021	11th
Muskan Singh	Bhopal	Kathak, Tutting	~~Bhawna Khanduja~~/ Kumar Sharma	Eliminated; 28 November 2021	12th

== Score chart ==
Artists		Auditions Rounds			Grand Premiere	Race to Top 8					Race to Finale				Grand Finale	
Artists		Auditions		Mega Auditions (Top 12)	Grand Premiere	Week 1	Week 2	Week 3	Week 4	Week 5	Week 6	Week 7	Week 8		Week 9	
Contestants	Choreographer	16–17 October ^{[a]}	23–24 October ^{[b]}	30–31 October ^{[c]}	6–7 November	13–14 November	20–21 November	27–28 November	4–5 December	11–12 December	18–19 December	25–26 December	1 January	2 January	8–9 January	
Total Score					No Points	30					60		30	No Points		
Saumya	Vartika	Advanced to top 12			No Points	30	28	30	30	30	60	60	30	Finalists	Winner	
Gourav	Rupesh	Advanced to top 12			No Points	30	30	24	30	28	60	60	30	Finalists	1st Runner-up	
Roza	Sanam	Advanced to top 12			No Points	29	30	29	30	24	55	57	30	Finalists	2nd Runner-up	
Raktim	Aryan	Advanced to top 12			No Points	28	30	30	29	27	58	59	25	Finalists	3rd Runner-up	
Zamroodh	Sonali	Advanced to top 12			No Points	29	30	27	30	30	53	60	30	Finalists	4th Runner up	
Akash	Tushar	Advanced to top 12			No Points	25	30	28	27	27	52	54	30	Eliminated (1 January)		
Dibbay	Pankaj	Advanced to top 12			No Points	30	26	27	29	27	57	56	NP	Eliminated (1 January)		
Sanket	Anuradha	Advanced to top 12			No Points	25	30	30	30	30	54	NP	NP	Eliminated (1 January)		
Kanchi	Paul	Advanced to top 12			No Points	30	29	26	30	24	Eliminated (12 December)					
Apeksha	Sadhwi	Advanced to top 12			No Points	30	30	27	27	24	Eliminated (12 December)					
Milind	Chandni	Advanced to top 12			No Points	29	28	24	25	Eliminated (5 December)						
Muskan	~~Bhawna~~/ Kumar	Advanced to top 12			No Points	24	23	27	Eliminated (28 November)							
Notes		^{[1]},^{[2]}		^{[3]}	^{[4]}						^{[5]}	^{[6]}	^{[7]}			
BTM		No Elimination				Muskan	Muskan	Gourav; Milind	Milind; Apeksha; Akash	Apeksha; Kanchi; Roza	Akash; Zamroodh; Sanket	Akash; Dibbay; Sanket	Raktim; Dibbay; Sanket		None	
Eliminated		No Elimination				No Elimination		Muskan	Milind	Apeksha	No Elimination		Akash		Roza	Saumya
Eliminated		No Elimination				No Elimination		Muskan	Milind	Kanchi	No Elimination		Dibbay		Zamroodh	Saumya
Eliminated		No Elimination				No Elimination		Muskan	Milind	Kanchi	No Elimination		Sanket		Raktim	Gaurav

Color key

indicates the contestant was eliminated.
indicates the contestants in bottom.
indicates the contestants got the full score.
indicates the contestants did not perform.
indicates the winner of the season.
indicates the runner-up of the season.
indicates the contestant quit the show.
indicates the finalists of the season.

=== Notes ===
- ^1: On 16th,17th,23 & 24 October the episodes aired were auditions rounds only.
- ^2: Initially Rajendra Bishnoi is in top 12 but due his injury Stand-By contestant Dibbay Das join Best 12.
- ^3: On 30 & 31 October the episodes were Mega Auditions and selected the top 12 contestants.
- ^4: On 6 & 7 November the episodes were Grand Premiere there contestants were not scored by judges.
- ^5: On 18 & 19 December, the contestants performed twice (one with their choreographer and the other with the contestant) and the contestants got scores from the judges twice.
- ^6: On 25 & 26 December, Sanket did not perform due to the demise of his father and hence did not receive the score.
- ^7: On 1 January, Dibbay Das did not perform as he got injured while practicing and hence did not receive the score.

== Battle of the best ==
Battle Between The Bottom Contestants
Sr. No.	Contestants	Result	
Sr. No.	Contestants	Eliminated	Safe
1	Muskan vs Milind	Muskan	Milind
2	Akash vs Apeksha vs Milind	Milind	Apeksha & Akash
3	Apeksha vs Kanchi vs Roza	Apeksha	Roza
3	Apeksha vs Kanchi vs Roza	Kanchi	Roza

== Episodes ==
No. overall	No. in season	Title	Length (minutes)	Original release date	Episode link
49	1	"Best Ka Next Avatar"	75 Minutes	16 October 2021	Episode 1
India's Best Dancer is back with its second instalment and is finding the 'Best Ka Next Avatar' with the best judges, Terrence Lewis, Geeta Kapoor and Malaika Arora.
50	2	"Desh Hai Taiyaar"	73 Minutes	17 October 2021	Episode 2
Enthusiastic contestants battle it out in the hope of securing a spot in the next round.
51	3	"Dance Ke Dhurandar"	71 Minutes	23 October 2021	Episode 3
The Best judges take their seats to find India's next 'Best Ka Avatar' as the contestants prove their talents within 90 seconds.
52	4	"Khoj Hai Jaari"	73 Minutes	24 October 2021	Episode 4
As we reach the last day of the auditions, the judges look for the 'Best Ka Next Avatar.
53	5	"Mega Audition Ki Shuruat"	77 Minutes	30 October 2021	Episode 5
As the Mega Auditions begin, the contestants need to fight it out in the 'Choreography' and the 'Dance Off' rounds to make their way to top 12. Who will...
54	6	"Best Barah Ki Talaash"	77 Minutes	31 October 2021	Episode 6
The dance-off on the mega auditions continues as the judges are on the hunt for the 'Best Barah'.
55	7	"Grand Premiere"	73 Minutes	6 November 2021	Episode 7
The top 12 contestants and the judges gear up for the 'Grand Premiere' of India's Best Dancer and go on the quest to find the 'Best Ka Next...
56	8	"Sabke Baara Baj Gaye"	75 Minutes	7 November 2021	Episode 8
The Top 12 contestants come with breathtaking performances to the stage and make this premiere grand in its true sense.
57	9	"Best Banne Ka Competition"	73 Minutes	13 November 2021	Episode 9
The quest to find the best dancer begins as the judges start marking the contestants on their performances.
58	10	"Dance Ka Bugle"	71 Minutes	14 November 2021	Episode 10
The quest to find the best dancer continues as the second round of contestants are eager to prove themselves in front of the judges.
59	11	"Suniel and Karisma Special"	74 Minutes	20 November 2021	Episode 11
As the elimination process begins, Suniel Shetty and Karisma Kapoor join the judge's panel for a night filled with dazzling performances.
60	12	"90's Ki Blockbuster Jodi"	78 Minutes	21 November 2021	Episode 12
The blockbuster pairing of Suniel Shetty and Karisma Kapoor joins the judges' panel for a night filled with terrific performances and unlimited entertainment.
61	13	"Chunky And Neelam Special"	74 Minutes	27 November 2021	Episode 13
The contestants bring their A-game as superstars from the 80s, Neelam Kothari and Chunky Panday, arrive on the IBD stage as special...
62	14	"Satyameva Jayate On The Sets Of IBD"	78 Minutes	28 November 2021	Episode 14
The contestants put up a series of outstanding performances for the supremely talented Nora Fatehi and the ‘Satyameva Jayate 2’ actress, Divya Khosla Kumar
63	15	"Chandigarh Kare Aashiqui On The IBD Stage"	73 Minutes	4 December 2021	Episode 15
Stars of the upcoming film 'Chandigarh Kare Aashiqui', Vaani Kapoor and Ayushmann Khurrana grace the IBD stage and motivate the...
64	16	"Celebrating 75 Years Of Asha Ji"	86 Minutes	5 December 2021	Episode 16
It's an honour for India's Best Dancer to host legendary playback singer Asha Bhosle and celebrate her illustrious career.
65	17	"Dharmendra And Asha Ji Special"	74 Minutes	11 December 2021	Episode 17
The 'He-Man' of Indian Cinema, Dharmendra and Legendary actress, Asha Parekh grace the IBD stage as the contestants dance to their
66	18	"Celebrating Dharmendra And Asha Parekh"	75 Minutes	12 December 2021	Episode 18
Iconic superstars from the past, Dharam Ji and Asha Ji join us for yet another episode of India's Best Dancer, where the contestants compete to be the best in...
67	19	"Dance Ka Super Sangam"	70 Minutes	18 December 2021	Episode 19
The entertainment gets doubled as 'India's Best Dancer' contestants dance along with 'Super Dancer Chapter 4' contestants, filling the stage with breathtaking acts.
68	20	"Dance ka super Sangam -2"	73 Minutes	19 December 2021	Episode 20
The entertainment gets doubled as 'India's Best Dancer' contestants dance along with 'Super Dancer Chapter 4' contestants, filling the stage with breathtaking acts.
69	21	"Maa Special"	79 Minutes	25 December 2021	Episode 21
India's Best Dancer celebrates the mothers and gives them a heartfelt tribute with beautiful performances.
70	22	"Guru Randhawa And Nora Fatehi Special"	77 Minutes	26 December 2021	Episode 22
King of Punjabi music Guru Randhawa and the elegant and gorgeous Nora Fatehi grace the stage with their presence on India's Best Dancer.
71	23	"Race to Finale"	72 Minutes	1 January 2022	Episode 23
With the New Year set in, India's Best Dancer contestants compete against each other with phenomenal acts to reach the finale. Who will make it to the best 5?
72	24	"Top 5 Finalists"	63 Minutes	2 January 2022	Episode 24
As the competition progresses towards the finale, the top five contestants of India's Best Dancer give their best and present a spectacular show. With their neighbours and 'mohalla walas' as special guests for the episode, the contestants have all the motivation and backing they need.
73	25	"Pre-Finale"	69 Minutes	8 January 2022	Episode 25
The contestants gear up for the 'Pre-Finale' of India's Best Dancer Season 2 and give it their all to take home the title of 'Best Ka Next Avatar'.
74	26	"The Ultimate Finale"	125 Minutes	9 January 2022	TBA

== Guests ==
Sr.	Date	Episode	Guest	Featured	Guest |Ref(s)
1	20 & 21 November	11-12	Suniel Shetty & Karisma Kapoor	90's Special	
2	27 November	13	Chunky Panday & Neelam Kothari	Neelam and Chunky Special	
3	28 November	14	Nora Fatehi & Divya Khosla Kumar	To Promote Satyameva Jayate 2	
4	4 December	15	Ayushmann Khurrana & Vaani Kapoor	To Promote Chandigarh Kare Aashiqui	
5	5 December	16	Asha Bhosle	Celebrating 75 Years of Asha Ji	
6	11–12 December	17-18	Dharmendra & Asha Parekh	Dharmendra And Asha Ji Special	
7	18–19 December	19-20	Ex-contestants of Super Dancer 4	Dance Ka Super Sangam	
8	26 December	22	Nora Fatehi and Guru Randhawa	To Promote The Song: Dance Meri Rani	
9	9 January	26	Shilpa Shetty, Badshah, Dharmesh Yelande, Mika Singh & Manoj Muntashir	The Ultimate Finale	

== See also ==
- Dance Plus
- Dance India Dance
- Dance Deewane
- Super Dancer
