= Salman Yusuff Khan =

Indian dancer (born 1985)

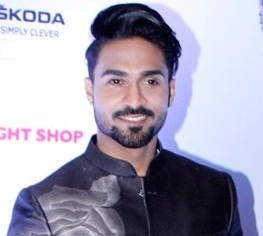
- Khan in 2017
- Born: 12 June 1985 (age 41); Bangalore, Karnataka, India
- Occupations: Dancer; actor; choreographer
- Years active: 2009–present
- Spouse: Faiza Haramain (m. 2013)
- Children: 2

Salman Yusuff Khan (born 12 June 1985) is an Indian dancer, actor, choreographer and television judge. He participated in and emerged as winner of Dance India Dance 1. He also participated in Fear Factor: Khatron Ke Khiladi 5 and Jhalak Dikhhla Jaa 9.

== Career ==
Khan, born Mohammad Ghause, started his career with the dance reality show Dance India Dance in its first season. After winning the show, Khan appeared in the title song of Wanted. He then did the music video "Dance Of Death" for the movie Rakta Charitra and in the video Alive (2011). He appeared in the film Sukoon - Vaishali Made.

In 2013, he debuted as an actor in the 3D dance-based film ABCD: Anybody Can Dance, which was released on 8 February 2013, directed by Remo D'Souza co-starring Prabhu Deva, Dharmesh Yelande, Lauren Gottlieb and Punit Pathak.

He later participated in Jhalak Dikhhla Jaa first as a choreographer opposite Yana Gupta (Season 4), Isha Sharvani (Season 5) and became the winner with Drashti Dhami (Season 6) in 2013. In 2014, he was a participant of Fear Factor: Khatron Ke Khiladi 5. He was also choreographer in Creature 3D, Zid. Salman was a judge in the dance reality show Dance Dance Juniors.

In 2018, he starred in the Tamil dance film Lakshmi, which was released on 24 August 2018, directed by A. L. Vijay co-starring Prabhu Deva, Ditya Bhande, and Aishwarya Rajesh. Later, he is the judge of dance reality show HIGH FEVER, and he also was a Choreographer in Welcome to New York.

In 2020, he appeared in the dance film Street Dancer 3D which was released on 24 January 2020, directed by Remo D'Souza co-starring Varun Dhawan, Shraddha Kapoor, Prabhu Deva, Raghav Juyal, and Nora Fatehi.

In 2023, he started in a promotional short film for Apple Inc., titled Fursat, directed by Vishal Bhardwaj on an iPhone 14 Pro.

== Personal life ==
Khan married his longtime girlfriend, an air hostess, Faiza Haramain, in 2013.

== Filmography ==
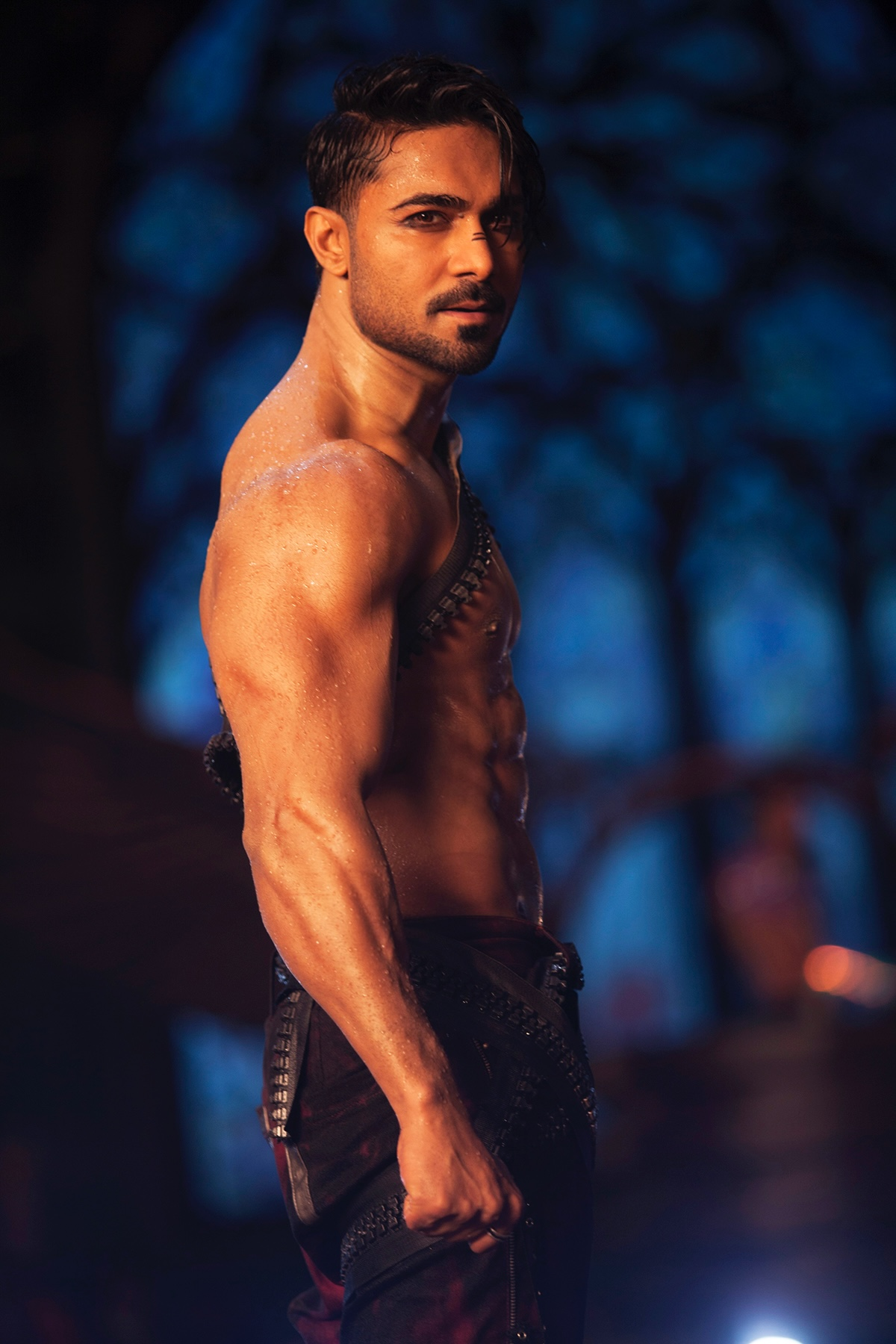
Salman yusuff khan on the sets of Street Dancer 3D

Year	Film	Role
2009	Wanted	Himself in the song "Most Wanted Track"
2011	Rakta Charitra	Himself in the title song "Mila Toh Marega"
2013	ABCD: Anybody Can Dance	Rocky
2014	Darling (Kannada)	Choreographer
2014	Zid	Choreographer
2014	Creature 3D	Choreographer
2016	G Kutta Se	Choreographer
2017	Love You Family	Raj
2017	Heartbeats (English)	Pallav
2018	Dil Juunglee	Choreographer
2018	Welcome to New York	Choreographer
2018	Lakshmi (Tamil)	Yusuff Khan
2020	Street Dancer 3D	Zain
2023	Fursat	Chief Gangster
2025	Be Happy	Himself

== Television ==
Year	Show	Channel	Role
2009	Dance India Dance 1	Zee TV	Contestant (Winner)
2011	Jhalak Dikhlaa Jaa 4	Sony Entertainment Television	Choreographer
2012	Jhalak Dikhlaa Jaa 5	Colors TV	Choreographer
2013	Jhalak Dikhlaa Jaa 6	Colors TV	Choreographer
2014	Jhalak Dikhlaa Jaa 7	Colors TV	Guest
2014	Fear Factor: Khatron Ke Khiladi 5	Colors TV	Contestant (Finalist)
2015	Fear Factor: Khatron Ke Khiladi 6	Colors TV	Guest
2015	Nach Baliye 7	Star Plus	Guest
2015	Jhalak Dikhhla Jaa 8	Colors TV	Guest
2016	Jhalak Dikhhla Jaa 9	Colors TV	Contestant (Runner-up)
2016	Comedy Nights Bachao	Colors TV	Guest
2017	Dance Dance Juniors	Star Suvarna	Judge
2018	High Fever.. Dance Ka Naya Tevar	&TV	Judge
2020	Fear Factor: Khatron Ke Khiladi 10	Colors TV	Guest
2020	India's Best Dancer	Sony Entertainment Television	Guest
2020	The Kapil Sharma Show	Sony Entertainment Television	Guest
2020	Bigg Boss 14	Colors TV	Guest
2021	The War Of Talent	MX Player	Judge
2021	Dance Plus 6	Star Plus	Captain
