= India's Best Dancer (Hindi TV series) season 3 =

India's Best Dancer
- Season 3
- Hosted by: Jay Bhanushali
- Judges: Geeta Kapoor; Terence Lewis; Sonali Bendre
- No. of contestants: 14
- Winner: Samarpan Lama
- Winning mentor: Bhawana Khanduja
- Runner-up: Anjali Mamgai

Release
- Original network: Sony TV
- Original release: 8 April – 30 September 2023

Season chronology
- ← Previous; Season 2 Next → Season 4

India's Best Dancer 3, also known as India's Best Dancer: Har Move Se Karenge Prove, is the third season of the Indian reality TV series India's Best Dancer. It premiered on 8 April 2023 on Sony Entertainment Television. This season is hosted by Jay Bhanushali and judged by Geeta Kapoor, Terence Lewis and Sonali Bendre. Sonali Bendre has replaced Malaika Arora, who judged the previous seasons.

== Top 14 Contestants ==
S.no.	Contestant	Old Choreographer	Current Choreographer	City	Elimination Date	Status
1	Samarpan Lama	Paramdeep Singh	Bhawna Khanduja	Maharashtra	Finalists	Winner
2	Anjali Mamgai	Aryan Patra	Akash Thapa	Uttarakhand	Finalists	1st Runner-up
3	Shivanshu Soni	Shwetha Warrier	Vivek Chachere	Madhya Pradesh	Finalists	2nd Runner-up
4	Aniket Chauhan	Rupesh Soni	Kartik Raja	Delhi	Finalists	3rd Runner-up
5	Vipul Khandapal	Raktim Thakuria	Pankaj Thapa	Punjab	Finalists	4th Runner up
6	Boogie LLB	Saumya Kamble	Saumya Kamble	West Bengal	23 September 2023	Eliminated
7	Hansvi Tonk	Anuradha Iyenagar	Rutuja Junnarkar	Uttarakhand	17 September 2023	Eliminated
8	Akshay Pal	Vartika Jha	Subhranil Paul	Madhya Pradesh	10 September 2023	Quit
9	Debparna Goswami	Tarun Raj Nihalani	Tarun Raj Nihalani	West Bengal	3 September 2023	Eliminated
10	Shivam Wankhede	Sonali Kar	Vaibhav Ghuge	Maharashtra	3 September 2023	Eliminated
11	Sushmita Tamang	Subhranil Paul	Subhranil Paul	West Bengal	6 August 2023	Quit
12	Norbu Tamang	Tushar Shetty	Tushar Shetty	West Bengal	11 June 2023	Eliminated
12	Norbu Tamang	Tushar Shetty	Tushar Shetty	West Bengal	16 July 2023	Eliminated
13	Ram Bisht	Pankaj Thapa	Pankaj Thapa	Punjab	4 June 2023	Quit
14	Apeksha Londhe	Arundhati Garnaik	Arundhati Garnaik	Maharashtra	21 May 2023	Eliminated

== Guest ==
S.no.	Guest Name	Episode No.	Date
1	Yo Yo Honey Singh (to promote his song Naagan)	27	2 July 2023
2	Raveena Tandon	45-46	9 September 2023
3	Shah Rukh Khan, Atlee and Nayanthara (to promote Jawan}	46	9 September 2023
3	Yo Yo Honey Singh, Apache Indian	47	16 September 2023
4	Vishal Dadlani, Kumar Sanu	48	17 September 2023
5	Shilpa Shetty Kundra	49	23 September 2023
