= Saumya Kamble =

Indian dancer and choreographer

Saumya Kamble is a dancer and choreographer, known for her classical, hip hop, and contemporary dance styles. She came into the limelight after winning the Indian reality show India's Best Dancer S02.

== Career ==
In 2021, Saumya Kamble won India's Best Dancer Season 2. Saumya Kamble also participated as a finalist in Dance Icon 2022. Additionally, Saumya was a guest performer on Super Mom's Season 3 in 2022, where Varsha Bumra was a contestant. Saumya also served as a choreographer on India's Best Dancer 3, where Boogie LLB participated as a contestant. In 2024 Saumya was guest performance with Anshika Dhara in Dance+ pro.In August 2024, Saumya serves as a choreographer on India's Best Dancer 4, where Chitrakshi Batra participated as a contestant. Saumya is the Caption of Team India's Best Dancer in (Hindi TV series) Champions Ke Tashan Season 1,

== Personal life ==
Saumya Kamble hails from the city of Pune.
