= Vartika Jha =

Indian choreographer (born 2000)

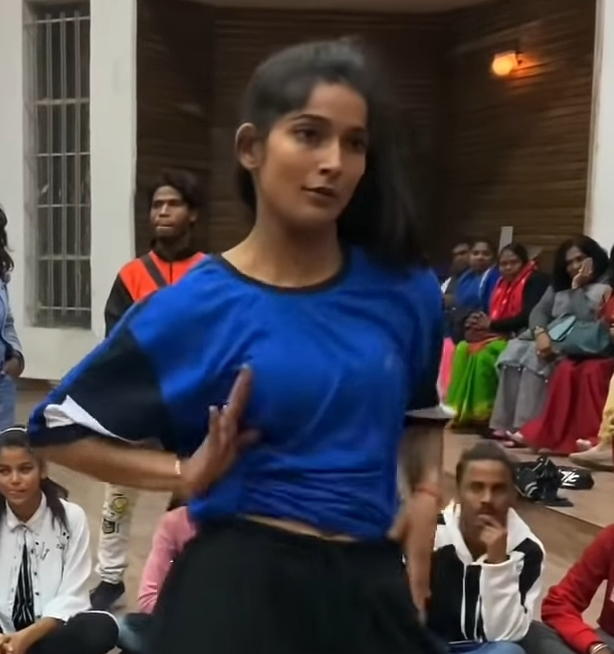
- Jha at a dance workshop in 2020
- Born: 8 April 2000 (age 26); Renusagar, Sonbhadra, Uttar Pradesh, India
- Occupations: Dancer; choreographer; actress
- Years active: 2018–present
- Style: Popping; Hip hop; Belly

Vartika Jha (born 8 April 2000) is an Indian choreographer, dancer, and actress. She was a contestant and runner-up in Star Plus's dance reality show Dance Plus (season 4) in 2018. She has since established herself as one of India's most popular dancers and choreographers.

== Early and personal life ==
Jha was born to Arvind Kumar Jha, an operator at Hindalco, Renusagar, and Kanta Jha on 8 April 2000 and was brought up in Sonbhadra, Uttar Pradesh. She born in a Hindu family.

== Career ==
After facing several rejections, Jha was selected on Dance Plus (season 4) in 2018 in Dharmesh Yelande's team, which aired on Star Plus. In the show, she reached finals where she was the 2nd runner-up.

The Dance Plus's judge, choreographer, and Bollywood director Remo D'Souza cast Vartika in his film Street Dancer 3D along with Varun Dhawan and Shraddha Kapoor.

She then participated as a choreographer in Sony TV's dance show India's Best Dancer (season 1), wherein Jha was the winning choreographer of the contestant Tiger Pop (Ajay Singh) who became the winner of India's Best Dancer (season 1) in 2020.

In 2021, Vartika choreographed the Super Dancer contestant, Sanchit Chanana, who became 2nd runner-up of the show in Sony TV's dance show Super Dancer Chapter 4.

She then worked as a choreographer in Sony TV's dance show India's Best Dancer (season 2), where Vartika was the winning choreographer of the contestant Saumya Kamble who became the winner of India's Best Dancer (season 2) in 2022.

In 2022, Vartika became the captain of team Vartika in Zee TV's dance show DID Li'l Masters (Season 5) where she choreographed for all the contestants of team Vartika. Then, she worked as a choreographer in Zee TV's dance show DID Super Moms (Season 3), where Vartika was the winning choreographer of Varsha Bumra who became the winner of DID Super Moms (Season 3) in 2022. In 2023, Jha was also a choreographer of Akshay Pal in India's Best Dancer (Season 3).

In 2024, she was a choreographer for her contestant Deepak Shahi (aka Nepo) in India's Best Dancer (Season 4), who finished in fourth place, as a finalist.

== Filmography ==
=== Films ===
†	Denotes films that have not yet been released

Year	Title	Role	Language	Notes
2020	Street Dancer 3D	Samaira	Hindi	
2025	Be Happy	Dancer	Hindi	

=== Television ===
Year	Network	Show	Role	Notes
2018	Star Plus	Dance Plus 4	Contestant	2nd Runner-up
2020	Star Plus	Dance Plus 5	Herself(artist)	Guest
2020	Sony TV	India's Best Dancer (season 1)	Choreographer	Winner with Tiger Pop
2021	Sony TV	Super Dancer Chapter 4	Choreographer	2nd Runner-up with Sanchit
2021	Star Plus	Dance Plus 6	Herself(artist)	Guest
2022	Sony TV	India's Best Dancer (season 2)	Choreographer	Winner with Soumya Kamble
2022	Colors TV	Dance Deewane Juniors 1	Herself(artist)	Guest dance partner with Riddhi
2022	Zee TV	DID Li'l Masters (Season 5)	Captain	Skipper Team Vartika
2022	Zee TV	DID Super Moms (Season 3)	Choreographer	Winner with Varsha Bumra
2022	Gemini TV	Dance Ikon (Season 1)	Herself(artist)	Guest dance partner with Soumya Kamble
2023	Sony TV	India's Best Dancer (season 3)	Choreographer	With Akshay Pal
2023	Amazon Mini TV	Hip Hop india (Season 1)	Herself(artist)	Guest performer
2024	Disney+ Hotstar	Dance Plus Pro	Herself(artist)	Guest dance partner with Aman & Kunal
2024	Sony TV	India's Best Dancer (season 4)	Choreographer	Fourth Place With Nepo
2025	Sony TV	IBD vs SD champions ka Tashan	Guest performer	With SD team
2025	Aha	Dance Icon (Season 2)	Wild fire contestant	Team Earth
2025	Amazon MX Player	Hip Hop India (Season 2)	Herself (artist)	Guest performer

=== Music videos ===
Year	Title	Singer(s)	Ref.
2022	Gaaye Ja	Arijit Singh	
2023	Eto kiser tara	Arijit Singh	
2023	Jalwa	CarryMinati	
2024	Dheere Dheere	Daba Notra	
