= Jay Bhanushali =

Indian television actor

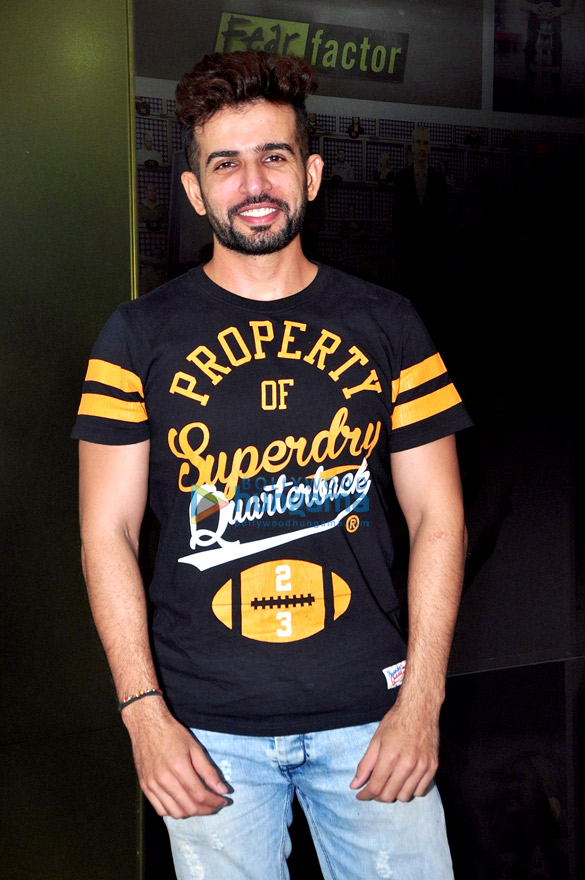
- Jay Bhanushali at the success bash of The Voice India Kids in 2016
- Born: 25 December 1984 (age 41); Ahmedabad, Gujarat, India
- Occupations: Model, actor, host, dancer
- Years active: 2005–present
- Notable work: Host of Dance India Dance
- Spouse: Mahhi Vij (m. 2011; div. 2026)
- Children: 3

Jay Bhanushali (born 25 December 1984) is an Indian actor who is known for working in Hindi television and film productions. He is best known for playing Neev Shergill in Ekta Kapoor's drama series Kayamath and winning dance reality series Nach Baliye 5. He also participated in other reality shows such as Jhalak Dikhhla Jaa 2, Kaun Jeetega Bollywood Ka Ticket, Iss Jungle Se Mujhe Bachao, Fear Factor: Khatron Ke Khiladi 7 and Bigg Boss 15.

== Early life ==
He was born 25 December 1984 in Ahmedabad, Gujarat, in a middle-class Gujarati Hindu family.

== Career ==
=== 2006–2009 ===
Bhanushali made his television debut with the show Kasautii Zindangii Kay by playing the supporting role. In 2007 he again played the supporting role of Varun Bhaskar.Dhoom Machaao Dhoom. He got his biggest break came when he was selected by Ekta Kapoor to play the role of protagonist Neev Shergill in her soap opera Kayamath. The role not only earned him praises but also won him several awards for his performance in the show. Bhanushali went on to win Indian Telly Award for Fresh New Face - Male, Indian Telly Award for Best Actor in a Supporting Role and various other awards for his performance. In 2007 he participated in Jhalak Dikhhla Jaa 2 where he finished as 2nd runner-up. In 2008 he participated in the show Kaun Jeetega Bollywood Ka Ticket where he finished as 6th place. In 2009 he also participated in the show Iss Jungle Se Mujhe Bachao as a wild-card where he got evicted on day 60. In same year he played the role Yuraaj in Kis Desh Mein Hai Meraa Dil. In same year, Bhanushali also hosted Dance India Dance .He won praise from several quarters for anchoring the show Dance India Dance for his anchoring skills and comic timings.

=== 2010–2013 ===
In 2010, he hosted Dance India Dance 2 and Meethi Choori No 1 where he was praised for his hosting skills. In same year he participated in the reality show Nachle Ve with Saroj Khan. In 2010 he played the role of Yash Malhotra in the show Geet – Hui Sabse Parayi. Bhanushali won Boroplus Gold Award for Best Anchor (2010 and 2012), Zee Rishtey Award for Favorite Host (2009, 2010 and 2011) and several other accolades. In 2011 he hosted dance show Dance India Dance Doubles. In 2012 he hosted several shows dance shows like Dance India Dance 3, Dance India Dance Li'l Masters 2, Dance Ke Superkids and Sa Re Ga Ma Pa Hindi 2012 and also won the dance reality show Nach Baliye 5 with his wife Mahhi Vij. In 2012 he played the Anuj in Kairi — Rishta Khatta Meetha. In 2013 he hosted the show Dance India Dance 4.

=== 2014–2017 and success ===
In 2014 he debut in romantic Thriller Hate Story 2 alongside Surveen Chawla. In 2014 only he played the role of Gyani in Desi Kattey. In the same year, he again hosted two dance shows Dance India Dance Li'l Masters 2 and Dil Se Naachein Indiawaale. In 2015 he played the role of Karan in Ek Paheli Leela alongside Sunny Leone and Rajneesh Duggal. In 2015 only he again hosted Dance India Dance 5. In 2016 he participated in the stunt-based reality show Khatron Ke Khiladi 7 and got eliminated in the 2nd week but re-entered on 5th week and voluntarily exited in 9th week and finished as 9th place. He hosted the dance show The Voice India Kids. In 2017 he hosted the show Sabse Bada Kalakar.

=== 2018–2021 ===
In 2018, he hosted the famous dance shows Super Dancer and Indian Idol 10. In 2019, he appeared as an episodic contestant in Kitchen Champion 5. He later hosted the dance reality show Superstar Singer. In 2020 he participated in Khatron Ke Khiladi - Made in India and finished as 6th place. In 2021, he participated in reality series Bigg Boss 15 and got evicted on day 55. Since April 2023, Bhanushali has been starring as Shivendra "Shiv" Barot in Hum Rahe Na Rahe Hum opposite Tina Datta.

== Filmography ==
=== Films ===
Year	Title	Role
2014	Hate Story 2	Akshay Bedi
2014	Desi Kattey	Gyani
2015	Ek Paheli Leela	Karan
2025	Be Happy	Himself

=== Web series ===
Year	Title	Role
2019	Parchhayee	Joy

=== Television ===
==== As actor / participant ====
Year	Title	Role	Notes	Ref(s)
2005	Kasautii Zindagii Kay	Arjit		
2007	Dhoom Machaao Dhoom	Varun Bhaskar		
2007–2008	Kayamath	Neev Shergill		
2007	Jhalak Dikhhla Jaa 2	Contestant	2nd runner-up	
2008	Kaun Jeetega Bollywood Ka Ticket	Contestant	4th place	
2009	Iss Jungle Se Mujhe Bachao	Contestant	5th place	
2009	Kis Desh Mein Hai Meraa Dil	Yuvraj		
2010	Nachle Ve with Saroj Khan	Contestant		
2010–2011	Geet – Hui Sabse Parayi	Yash Malhotra		
2012	Kairi — Rishta Khatta Meetha	Anuj Shrivastav		
2012	Nach Baliye 5	Contestant	Winner	
2013	Nach Baliye Shriman V/s Shrimati	Contestant		
2016	Fear Factor: Khatron Ke Khiladi 7	Contestant	9th place	
2019	Kitchen Champion 5	Contestant		
2020	Fear Factor: Khatron Ke Khiladi – Made in India	Contestant	6th place	
2021	Bigg Boss 15	Contestant	14th place	
2023	Hum Rahe Na Rahe Hum	Shivendra "Shiv" Barot		

==== As presenter ====
Year	Title	Role
2006	Play TV	Presenter
2009	Dance India Dance 1	Presenter
2010	Dance India Dance 2	Presenter
2010	Meethi Choori No 1	Presenter
2011	Dance India Dance Doubles	Presenter
2012	Dance India Dance 3	Presenter
2012	Dance India Dance Li'l Masters 2	Presenter
2012	Dance Ke Superkids	Presenter
2012	Sa Re Ga Ma Pa Hindi 2012	Presenter
2013	Dance India Dance 4	Presenter
2014	Dance India Dance Li'l Masters 4	Presenter
2014	Dil Se Naachein Indiawaale	Presenter
2015	Dance India Dance 5	Presenter
2016	The Voice India Kids	Presenter
2017	Sabse Bada Kalakar	Presenter
2018	Super Dancer	Presenter
2018	Indian Idol 10	Presenter
2019	Superstar Singer	Presenter
2022	Dance India Dance Li'l Masters 5	Presenter
2022	DID Super Moms 3	Presenter
2023	India's Best Dancer 3	Presenter
2024	India's Best Dancer 4	Presenter

==== Special appearances ====
Year	Title	Role
2008	Kumkum – Ek Pyara Sa Bandhan	Neev
2012	Parichay — Nayee Zindagi Kay Sapno Ka	Anuj
2013	Do Dil Bandhe Ek Dori Se	Himself
2015	Comedy Nights with Kapil	Himself
2017	The Drama Company	Himself
2018	Sabse Smart Kaun	Himself
2018	Bigg Boss 12	Himself
2019	Bigg Boss 13	Himself
2019	Ace of Space 2	Himself
2020	Mujhse Shaadi Karoge	Himself
2020	Fear Factor: Khatron Ke Khiladi 10	Himself

== Personal life ==
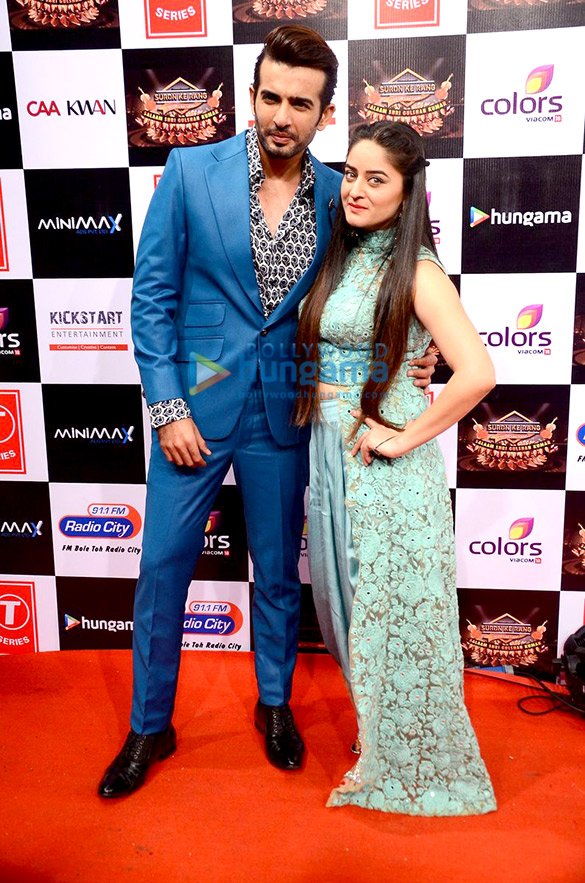
Jay with his then wife Mahhi Vij

Bhanushali married actress Mahhi Vij on 11 November 2011. In 2017 they fostered a boy, Rajveer, and a girl, Khushi. The couple's first biological child, a daughter named Tara, was born in 2019.

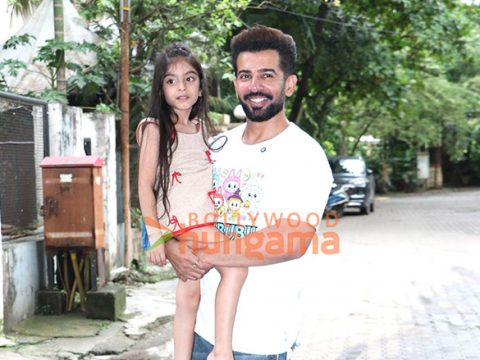
Bhanushali with daughter Tara in 2025

The couple divorced in 2026.

== See also ==
List of Indian television actors
