= Lyrical dance =

Style of contemporary dance performed to music with lyrics

Lyrical dance is a dance style that embodies various aspects of ballet, jazz, acrobatics, and modern dance. The style combines ballet technique with the freedom and musicality of jazz and contemporary. Often, lyrical dance is performed to slow, more fluid songs and movements, compared to contemporary which is faster and sharper. According to Jennifer Fisher, lyrical dance is “strongly associated with clearly displayed emotional moods, fast-moving choreographic strategies, emphasis on virtuosic display, illustration of song lyrics, and, in group form, exact unison.” The style is usually danced at a faster pace than ballet but not as fast as jazz. Lyrical dance is a category typically found in dance competitions.

== Style vs technique ==
Because of the links between these dance styles, teachers originally struggled with whether to teach lyrical dance as part of jazz or ballet, or as its own separate style. The main concerns with lyrical dance is the distinction between lyrical as a style and/or a technique. Lyrical has been described as a "pseudostyle" or a "pseudogenre" because it utilizes steps from other, more established styles of dance. Lyrical dance utilizes training from jazz technique, ballet technique, and modern technique as a basis for movement. These well-known movements are elongated, taken off their center, and distorted to create a new aesthetic in lyrical. Although advertised by some studios as a class, “lyrical technique” does not technically exist. A dancer cannot be proficient in lyrical dance without knowledge and mastery of basic technique from jazz, ballet, and modern.

== Use in popular culture ==
Lyrical dance is competition dance style and is only used to describe a specific style of dance in the world of competitive dance. “Lyrical” is used to describe a quality or movement type in other dance settings, but not as a style name such as Jazz or Ballet. There has only been one instance of lyrical being used in a professional setting. This was on Season 1 of the popular American dance show So You Think You Can Dance. Contestants on this reality show were asked to compete in many different styles such as ballroom, hip-hop, jazz, and lyrical. The term lyrical was replaced by the term contemporary in Season 2 of the show. This was thought to have been done to professionally legitimize this show. Despite the name change, the type of dances performed in this style remain very similar.

== See also ==
- Lyrical ballet
