= Terence Lewis (choreographer) =

Indian choreographer

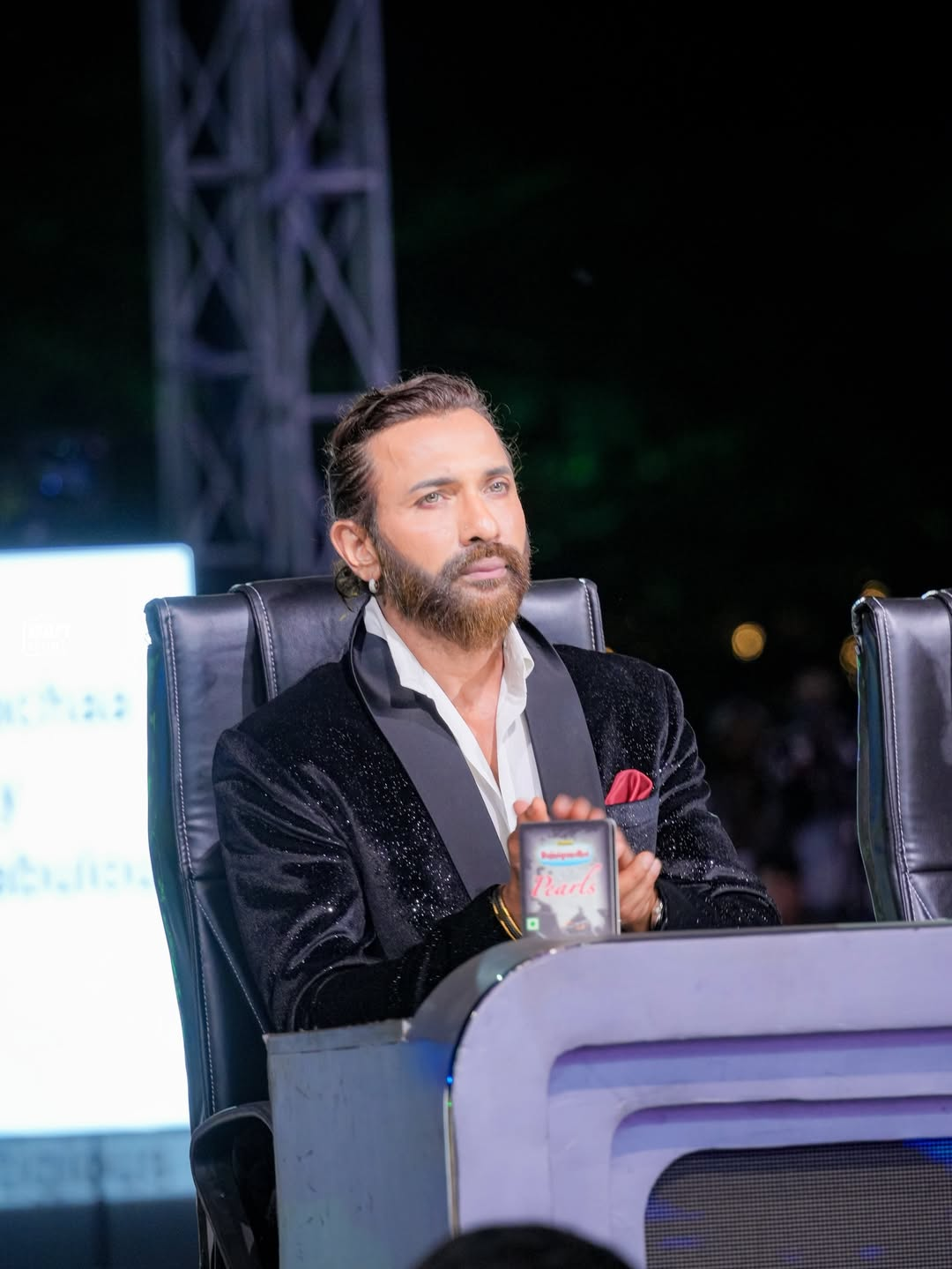
- Terence Lewis at Femina Miss India event in Bhubaneswar April 2026
- Born: 10 April 1975 (age 51); Mumbai, Maharashtra, India
- Occupations: Dancer, Choreographer, Actor, Singer, Motivational Speaker, Innovator, Creator, Path Breaker
- Website: terencelewis.com

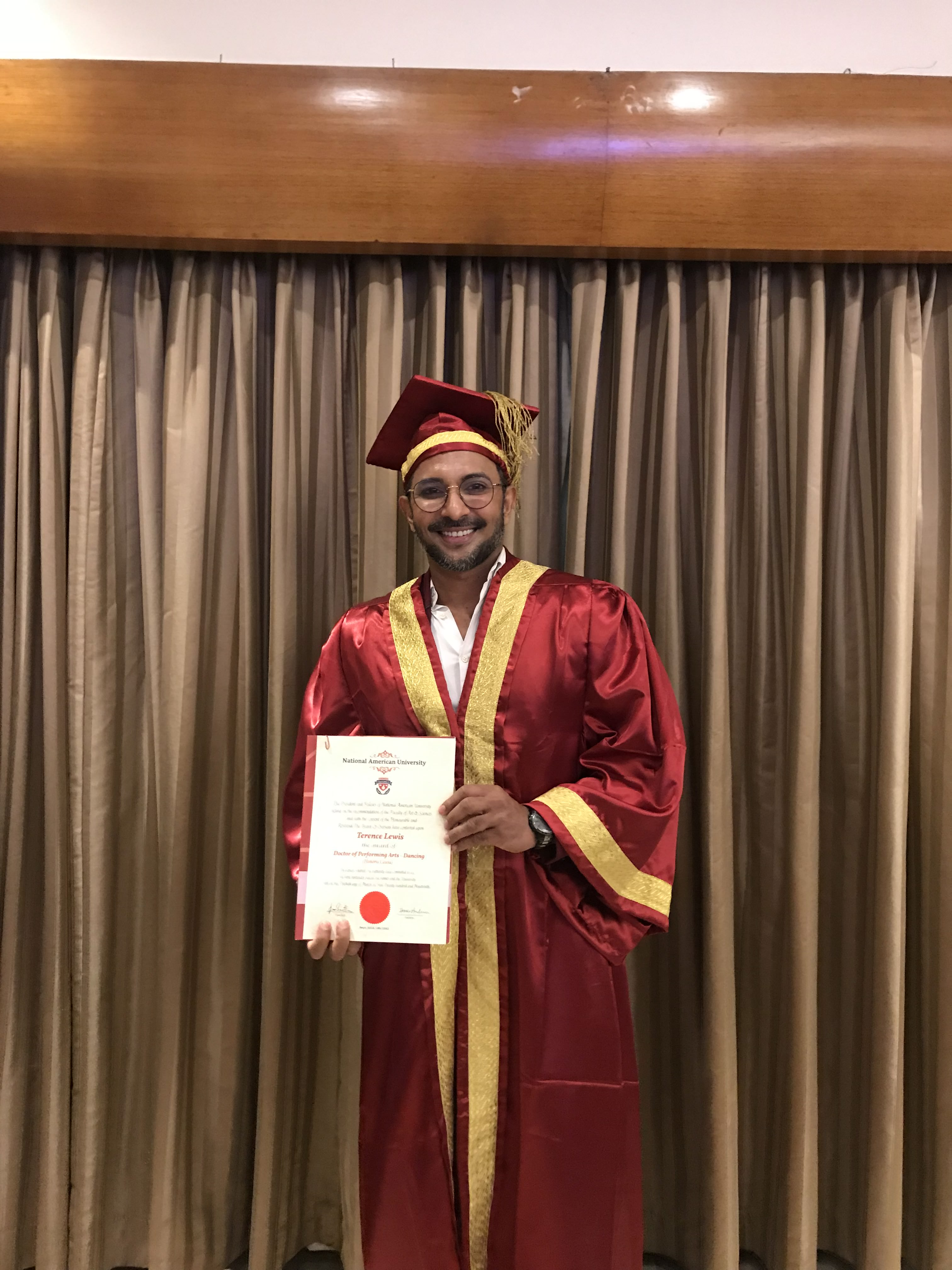
Terence Lewis was recently Honored a Doctorate degree in Performing Arts and Dance.

Terence Lewis is an Indian dancer and choreographer. He is known for judging the reality dance shows Dance India Dance (2009–2012) and Nach Baliye (2012–2017).

He has choreographed in Bollywood films like, Lagaan (2001), Jhankaar Beats (2003) and Goliyon Ki Raasleela Ram-Leela (2013), apart from doing musicals, stage shows, ads, music videos and national and international dance competitions. He was a contestant on Fear Factor: Khatron Ke Khiladi 3 (2010) on Colors TV. He was last seen as a judge on India's Best Dancer (2020–2024).

== Early life and training ==
Terence Lewis was raised in Mumbai (Bombay) by a Mangalorean Catholic family of Xavier Lewis and Teresa Lewis. He is trained in jazz, ballet and contemporary dance at the Alvin Ailey American Dance Theater and the Martha Graham Center of Contemporary Dance in New York.

== Career ==
Lewis is a choreographer in several Bollywood films. He has also choreographed a number of stage shows, Indian contemporary performances, corporate launches, broadway westend musicals, feature films and music videos. Lewis won the 2002 American Choreography Award for choreographing the songs of the movie Lagaan along with Saroj Khan, Raju Khan, Ganesh Hegde and Vaibhavi Merchant. He has also choreographed for movies like What's Your Raashee?, Jhankaar Beats, Naach, etc.

=== Dance India Dance ===
Terence Lewis has been a judge on Dance India Dance for its 1st three seasons. In the first season, his contestant Alisha Singh came in second place. In the second season, his contestant Shakti Mohan won the contest. In the third season, his contestants Pradeep Gurung and Raghav Juyal came in second place behind Rajasmita Kar and third place respectively.

=== Fear Factor: Khatron Ke Khiladi 3 ===
In 2010, Lewis was a contestant on Colors TV's Fear Factor: Khatron Ke Khiladi 3 hosted by Priyanka Chopra. The 3rd season for 13 boys was held in Copacabana, Brazil. He was eliminated in the 11th episode of the show.

== Filmography ==
Lewis has done more than 25 movies and musical albums. He is well known for his work in Lagaan, Goliyon Ki Raasleela Ram-Leela and Gold.

Year	Title	Role	Ref
2026	Aaj Ka Mahishasur	Sheru	1

== Television ==
Year	Name	Role	Channel	Ref
2009	Dance India Dance 1	Judge	Zee TV	
2009–2010	Dance India Dance 2	Judge	Zee TV	
2010	Fear Factor: Khatron Ke Khiladi 3	Contestant	Colors TV	
2011–2012	Dance India Dance 3	Judge	Zee TV	
2012–2013	Nach Baliye 5	Judge	Star Plus	
2013–2014	Nach Baliye 6	Judge	Star Plus	
2014	Comedy Nights with Kapil	Guest	Colors TV	
2015	Dance India Dance Super Moms 2	Judge	Zee TV	
2016	So You Think You Can Dance	Judge	&TV	
2017	The Kapil Sharma Show	Guest	Sony TV	
2017	Nach Baliye 8	Judge	Star Plus	
2017	The Drama Company	Guest	Sony TV	
2017	Dance Champions	Judge	Star Plus	
2017	Dance Plus 3	Guest	Star Plus	
2018	Dance Plus 4	Guest	Star Plus	
2019	Kitchen Champion 5	Guest	Colors TV	
2019	Dance Plus 5	Guest	Star Plus	
2020	India's Best Dancer 1	Judge	Sony TV	
2021	Super Dancer 4	Guest	Sony TV	
2021	India's Best Dancer 2	Judge	Sony TV	
2022	Jhalak Dikhhla Jaa 10	Guest Judge	Sony TV	
2023	India's Best Dancer 3	Judge	Sony TV	
2024	India's Best Dancer 4	Judge	Sony TV	
2026	India's Best Dancer 5	Judge		
