= Geeta Kapur (choreographer) =

Indian choreographer and television personality

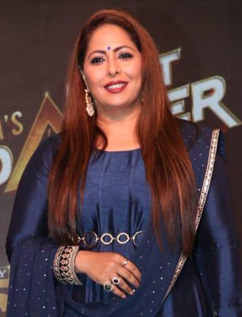
- Kapur in 2020
- Born: 5 July 1973 (age 53); Bombay, Maharashtra, India
- Occupations: Choreographer; television personality
- Years active: 1990–present

Geeta Kapur (born 5 July 1973) is an Indian choreographer and television personality. She has judged several Indian dance reality shows, such as Dance India Dance (2009–2015), Super Dancer (2016–present), and India's Best Dancer (2020–present).

== Career ==
Kapur started her career when she joined the troupe of noted Bollywood choreographer Farah Khan at the age of 17. She later assisted Farah Khan in many films, including Kuch Kuch Hota Hai, Dil Toh Pagal Hai, Kabhi Khushi Kabhi Gham, Mohabbatein, Kal Ho Na Ho, Main Hoon Na, and Om Shanti Om, and the musical Bombay Dreams (2004). She led choreography in many Bollywood films, including Fiza (2000), Asoka (2001), Saathiya (2002), Heyy Babyy (2007), Thoda Pyaar Thoda Magic (2008), Aladin (2009), Tees Maar Khan's Sheila Ki Jawani' (2010), Tere Naal Love Ho Gaya (2011), and Shirin Farhad Ki Toh Nikal Padi (2012). She has also choreographed award ceremonies and concerts like Temptation Reloaded, and has also choreographed the opening ceremony of Pepsi IPL 2013.

She started out as a secondary background dancer in many song sequences such as the song 'Dum Tara' of Suchitra Krishnamoorthi, 'Tujhe Yaad Na Meri Aaye' from the movie Kuch Kuch Hota Hai, and 'Gori Gori' from Main Hoon Na, using a mix of classical and modern dance moves. Starting in the late 1990s she performed in movies such as Nayak. She also appeared in Kuch Kuch Locha Hai.

Kapur made her television debut with the reality show Dance India Dance (season 1) on Zee TV in 2008, with co-judges choreographers Terrence Lewis and Remo D'Souza. Mithun Chakrabarty was the grand master. She trained a group which was called Geeta Ki Gang.

In 2009, she appeared on the season 2 of Dance India Dance, along with choreographers Terrence Lewis and Remo D'Souza as judges and mentors. They trained 18 contestants in dance forms like ballet, acrobatics, mid-air dancing, contemporary, Bollywood and hip-hop.

She made a special appearance in the show DID Lil Masters, in which her mentor Farah Khan and Sandip Soparkar were the judges, during auditions as well as in a special episode. She also acted as the judge of DID Doubles along with choreographers Marzi Pestonji and Rajiv Surti. She judged the third season of the highly acclaimed show Dance India Dance along with Terrence Lewis, and Remo D'Souza. In 2012, she was seen judging the second season of DID Lil Masters along with Marzi Pestonji. Kapur was then seen as a judge of Dance Ke Superkids along with Farah Khan and Marzi.

She is a judge on Super Dancer Chapter 4 alongside Shilpa Shetty Kundra and Anurag Basu.

== Television ==
Year	Show	Role	Channel
2009	Dance India Dance (season 1)	Judge	Zee TV
2010	Dance India Dance (season 2)	Judge	Zee TV
2010	DID Li'l Masters (season 1)	Judge	Zee TV
2010	Dance Ke Superstars	Judge	Zee TV
2011	DID Doubles	Judge	Zee TV
2011	Dance India Dance (season 3)	Judge	Zee TV
2012	DID Li'l Masters (season 2)	Judge	Zee TV
2012	Dance Ke Superkids	Judge	Zee TV
2013	India's Dancing Superstar	Judge	STAR Plus
2013	DID Dance Ka Tashan	Judge	Zee TV
2014	DID Li'l Masters ( season 3 )	Judge	Zee TV
2015	Dance India Dance Super Mom Season 2	Judge	Zee TV
2015	Dance India Dance (season 5)	Guest	Zee TV
2016	Super Dancer - Dance Ka Kal	Judge	Sony TV
2017	Super Dancer (Chapter 2)	Judge	Sony TV
2018	Super Dancer (Chapter 3)	Judge	Sony TV
2018	India Ke Mast Kalandar	Judge	Sony SAB
2019	Dance Plus (season 5)	Guest	Star Plus
2020	India's Best Dancer	Judge	Sony TV
2021	Maharashtra's Best Dancer	Guest	Sony Marathi
2021	Super Dancer (Chapter 4)	Judge	Sony Entertainment Television
2021-22	India's Best Dancer - 2	Judge	Sony Entertainment Television
2022	Bigg Boss 15	Panelist	Colors TV
2023	India's Best Dancer Season 3	Judge	Sony Entertainment Television
2024	India's Best Dancer Season 4	Judge	Sony Entertainment Television

== See also ==
- List of dancers
