= Super Dancer =

Indian Hindi-language kids dance reality television series

- Genre: Dance; Drama; Comedy
- Created by: Florina Golwalkar; Ranjeet Thakur; Ujjwal Anand; Arvind Rao
- Presented by: Paritosh Tripathi (S1-Present); Rithvik Dhanjani (S1-4); Jay Bhanushali (S2)
- Judges: Shilpa Shetty Kundra (S1-Present); Geeta Kapoor (S1-Present); Anurag Basu (S1-4); Marzi Pestonji (S5)
- Country of origin: India
- Original language: Hindi
- No. of seasons: 5
- No. of episodes: 189

Production
- Producers: Gautam Mrinal; Ranjeet Thakur ll
- Camera setup: Multi-camera
- Production company: Frames Production

Original release
- Network: Sony Entertainment Television
- Release: 10 September 2016

Super Dancer is an Indian Hindi-language kids dance reality television series, which airs on Sony Entertainment Television. The show is produced by Ranjeet Thakur and Hemant Ruprell for their production house Frames Production.

== Concept ==
The show aims to find a child with the potential to be the future of dance.

After the initial auditions and mega auditions, 12 contestants are selected to be competing for the title of Dance Ka Kal (future of dance). They are each paired with one choreographer who train, choreograph acts and also perform with their contestant. The dancers perform on Saturdays and along with their choreographers on Sunday. The performances are voted by the audience every week on the website or the SonyLiv App. On the basis of the number of votes, one kid is being eliminated every week.

== Judges & Hosts ==
Judge	Chapter 1	Chapter 2	Chapter 3	Chapter 4	Chapter 5
Anurag Basu	Judge	Judge	Judge	Judge	-
Geeta Kapoor	Judge	Judge	Judge	Judge	Judge
Shilpa Shetty Kundra	Judge	Judge	Judge	Judge	Judge
Marzi Pestonji	-	-	-	-	Judge
Paritosh Tripathi	Host	Host	Host	Host	Host
Rithvik Dhanjani	Host	Host	Host	Host	-
Jay Bhanushali	-	Host	-	-	-

== Series details ==
Chapter	Hosts			Judges			Episodes	Originally aired			Contestants	Winner	Winner's Hometown	Winner's Choreographer	Runner-up	Runner-up's Choreographer
Chapter	Hosts			Judges			Episodes	Day First aired	Last aired	Network	Contestants	Winner	Winner's Hometown	Winner's Choreographer	Runner-up	Runner-up's Choreographer
1	Paritosh Tripathi	Rithvik Dhanjani		Shilpa Shetty	Anurag Basu	Geeta Kapur	29	10 September 2016	17 December 2016	Sony Entertainment Television; Sony Entertainment Television Asia	12	Ditya Bhande	Mumbai, Maharashtra	Ruel Dausan Varindani	Yogesh Sharma	Vaibhav Ghuge
2	Paritosh Tripathi	Rithvik Dhanjani	Jay Bhanushali	Shilpa Shetty	Anurag Basu	Geeta Kapur	51	30 September 2017	24 March 2018	Sony Entertainment Television; Sony Entertainment Television Asia	14	Bishal Sharma	Jorhat, Assam	Vaibhav Ghuge	Vaishnavi Prajapati	Manan Sachdeva
3	Paritosh Tripathi	Rithvik Dhanjani		Shilpa Shetty	Anurag Basu	Geeta Kapur	52	29 December 2018	23 June 2019	Sony Entertainment Television; Sony Entertainment Television Asia	16	Rupsa Batabyal	Kolkata, West Bengal	Nishant Bhat	Tejas Varma	Tushar Shetty
4	Paritosh Tripathi	Rithvik Dhanjani		Shilpa Shetty	Anurag Basu	Geeta Kapur	57	30 January 2021	8 October 2021	Sony Entertainment Television; Sony Entertainment Television Asia	13	Florina Gogoi	Jorhat, Assam	Tushar Shetty	Prithviraj Kongari	Subhranil Paul
5	Paritosh Tripathi			Shilpa Shetty	Marzi Pestonji	Geeta Kapur	26	19 July 2025	12 October 2025	Sony Entertainment Television; Sony Entertainment Television Asia	13	Sukriti paul & Adhyashree Upadhyay (joint winners)	Siliguri, West Bengal & Guwahati, Assam	Anuradha Iyenger, & Pratiksha Sutar	Aditi Jadhav	Saumya Kamble and Vartika Jha

== Contestants ==
List of participants of all seasons

Contestant info

Position color key
Winner(s)
1st Runner-up
2nd Runner-up
3rd Runner-up
4th Runner-up
Quit
Eliminated

	Chapter 1	Chapter 2	Chapter 3	Chapter 4	Chapter 5
Participants
Participants	Ditya Bhande	Bishal Sharma	Rupsa Batabyal	Florina Gogoi	Sukriti Paul and Aadyayasree Upadhyay
Participants	Yogesh Sharma	Vaishnavi Prajapati	Tejas Varma	Pruthviraj Kongari	Aditi Jadhav
Participants	Deepali Borkar	Akash Thapa	Saksham Sharma	Sanchit Chanana	Apsara Boro
Participants	Masoom Narzary	Ritik Diwakar	Jayshree Gogoi	Neerja Tiwari	Somansh Dangwal
Participants	Laxman Kumbhar	Shagun Singh	Gourav Sarwan	Esha Mishra	Namish Gohil
Participants	Siddhant Damedhar	Akash Mitra	Akshit Bhandari	Anshika Rajput	Tracy Chakma
Participants	Ashish Das	Muskan Sharma	Dhairya Tandon	Soumit Barman	Anish Goel
Participants	Ananya Choksi	Adrija Sinha	Prerna Vijay Salvi	Pari Tamang	Binita Chetri
Participants	Varsha Mishra	Arushi Saxena	Anwesha Bhatia	Arshiya Sharma	Shanky Gupta
Participants	Harsh Prajapati	Vivek Jogdande	Naitik Singhal	Pratiti Das	Kavya Singh
Participants	Lakshay Sinha	Jyoti Ranjan Sahu	Jay Chauhan	Aneesh Tattikotta	Barkat Arora
Participants	Mahi Soni	Abir Rahman	Avastha Thapa	Amit Kumar	Tokjir Doley
Participants		Kunal Jyoti Rabha	Ridesh Bashyal	Spriha Rishi Kashyap	
Participants		Chandresh Delaware	Pritam Malik		
Participants			Devika Nair		
Participants			Nikhil Baghel		

== Super gurus ==
List of gurus of all seasons

Choreographer Calendar

Position color key
Winner
1st Runner-up
2nd Runner-up
3rd Runner-up
4th Runner-up
Quit
Eliminated

	Chapter 1	Chapter 2	Chapter 3	Chapter 4	Chapter 5
Super gurus
Super gurus	Ruel Dausan with Ditya Bhande	Vaibhav Ghuge with Bishal Sharma	Nishant Bhat with Rupsa Batabyal	Tushar Shetty with Florina Gogoi	Anuradha Iyenger with Sukriti Paul
Super gurus	Vaibhav Ghuge with Yogesh Sharma	Manan Sachdeva with Vaishnawi prajapati	Tushar Shetty with Tejas Varma	Subhranil Paul with Pruthviraj Kongari	Pratiksha Sutar with Adhyashree Upadhyay
Super gurus	Sonali kar with Deepali Borkar	Vivek Chachere with Akash Thapa	Vaibhav Ghuge with Saksham Sharma	Vartika Jha with Sanchit Chanana	Pankaj Thapa with Apsara Boro
Super gurus	Palden Lama with Masoom Narzary	Pratik utekar with Ritik Diwakar	Anuradha Iyengar with Jayshree Gogoi	Bhawna Khanduja with Neerja Tiwari	Saumya Kamble and Vartika Jha with Aditi Jadhav
Super gurus	Paul Marshal with Laxman Kumbhar	Aishwarya Radhakrishnan with Shagun Singh	Amardeep Singh Natt with Gourav Sarwan	Sonali kar with Esha Mishra	Vaibhav Ghuge with Somansh Dangwal
Super gurus	Shyam yadav with Siddhant Damedhar	Rishikyesh Jogadaand with Akash Mitra	Vivek Chachere with Akshit Bhandari	Aryan Patra with Anshika Rajput	Subhranil Paul with Namish Gohil
Super gurus	Lipsa Acharya with Ashish Das	Paul marshal with Muskan Sharma	Kumar Sharma with Dhairya Tandon	Vaibhav Ghuge with Soumit Barman	Raktim Thakuria, Nepo, And Akash Thapa with Tracy Chakma
Super gurus	Amrita Maitra with Ananya Choksi	Omkar Shinde and Palden Lama with Adrija Sinha	Bharat with Prerna Vijay Salvi	Pankaj thapa with Pari Tamang	Rupesh Soni with Anish Goel
Super gurus	Nishant Bhat with Varsha Mishra	Nishant bhat with Arushi Saxena	Anil with Anwesha Bhatia	Anuradha Iyengar with Arshiya Sharma	Paramdeep Singh with Binita Chetry
Super gurus	Anuja with Harsh Prajapati	Ruel Dausan with Vivek Jogdande	Pramoth with Naitik Singhal	Sweta warrior with Pratiti Das	Pratik Utekar with Barkat Arora
Super gurus	Biki Das with Lakshay Sinha	Anuradha Iyengar with Jyoti Ranjan Sahu	Sanam Johar with Jay Chauhan	Akash Shetty with Aneesh Tattikotta	Vipul with Shanky Gupta
Super gurus	Sneha kapoor with Mahi Soni	Sonali kar with Abir Rahman	Aryan Patra with Avastha Thapa	Amardeep Singh Natt with Amit Kumar	Vartika Jha and Vaishnavi Patil with Kavya Singh
Super gurus		Palden Lama with Kunal Jyoti Rabha	Shivani Patel with Ridesh Bashyal	Sanam Johar with Spriha Rishi Kashyap	Akash Thapa with Tokjir Doley
Super gurus		Khushboo with Chandresh Delaware	Pratik Utekar with Pritam Malik		
Super gurus			Aishwarya Radhakrishnan with Devika Nair		
Super gurus			Shyam Yadav with Nikhil Baghel		
