= Dance Plus season 1 =

Dance Plus
- Season 1
- Hosted by: Raghav Juyal
- Judges: Remo D'Souza
- Coaches: Dharmesh Yelande; Shakti Mohan; Sumeet Nagdev
- No. of contestants: 12
- Winner: V Company
- Winning mentor: Dharmesh Yelande
- Runner-up: Question Mark Crew
- Finals venue: Mumbai

Release
- Original network: Star Plus
- Original release: 26 July – 11 October 2015

Season chronology
- Next → Season 2

Season 1 of Dance Plus premiered on 26 July 2015 and broadcast on STAR Plus. The season is produced by Frames Productions. The tagline of the season was Ise Kehte Hain Dance (lit. This is called Dance). The auditions for the season were carried out in thirteen cities in India, between 3 June 2015 and 11 October 2015.

The season is hosted by Raghav Juyal.

== Super judge ==
Remo D'Souza, the choreographer who was earlier a part of the Colors' celebrity dance show Jhalak Dikhhla Jaa, and Zee TV's dance show Dance India Dance was the super judge of the season.

== Mentors ==
There were three mentors of the season:

- Dharmesh Yelande
- Sumeet Nagdev
- Shakti Mohan

== Teams ==
Dharmesh Yelande's Team	DYT	←Acronym↓
Hardik Rawat	Solo	Rubber Boy
Ravi and Bhargav	Duo	Sync Brothers
Shafad and Arafat	Duo	SA
Faizan	Solo	Bindaas Faizi
V Company	Group	VC
Shakti Mohan's Team	SMT	←Acronym↓
Poppin Ticko	Solo	Underground ki Baadshah
Rahul Barman	Solo	RB
13.13 Crew	Group	Swag
Banjara Girls	Group	Banjus
Piyush and Preeti	Duo	PP
Sumeet Nagdev's Team	SNT	←Acronym↓
Dharmendra	Solo	D+
Question Mark Crew	Group	Formation ki Jadugar
Base Crew	Group	BC
Nadeem	Solo	Golden Boy
Chandni and Gaurav	Duo	CG

== Special guests ==
Special Guest Appearances
Sr.	Guest(s)	Reason	Episode
1	Gauahar Khan and Yo Yo Honey Singh	Special Appearance	9 August 2015
2	Saif Ali Khan and Katrina Kaif	To Promote Their Film Phantom	16 August 2015
3	Anil Kapoor, John Abraham and Shruti Hassan	To Promote Their Film Welcome Back	30 August 2015
4	Salman Khan, Sooraj Pancholi and Athiya Shetty	To Promote Their Film Hero	6 September 2015
5	Gautam Gupta, Asha Negi and Aly Goni	To Promote Their Daily Soap Kuch Toh Hai Tere Mere Darmiyaan	27 September 2015
6	Akshay Kumar and Prabhu Deva	To Promote Their Film Singh is Bling	4 October 2015
7	Geeta Kapoor, Terence Lewis and Bharti Singh	Special Appearance	11 October 2015
