= Remo D'Souza =

Indian choreographer and filmmaker (born 1974)

Remo D’Souza
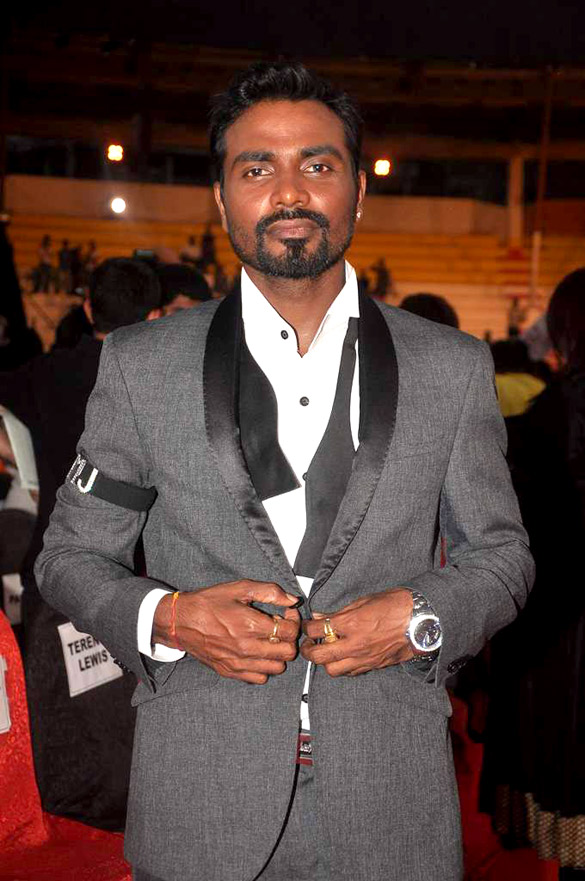
- D'Souza in June 2012
- Born: Ramesh Gopi Nair; 2 April 1974 (age 52); Bangalore, Karnataka, India
- Occupations: Choreographer; film director; producer
- Years active: 1995–present
- Spouse: Lizelle D'Souza (m. 1999)
- Children: 2

Remo Gopi D'Souza (born Ramesh Gopi Nair; 2 April 1974) is an Indian choreographer, film director, and producer. Over the course of his career spanning more than 25 years, D'Souza has choreographed more than 100 films. He is considered the most successful and renowned choreographer in the Hindi film industry and has served as a role model for many Indian choreographers. Additionally, he has been a judge on the dance reality show Dance Plus for seven consecutive seasons.

== Early and personal life ==
D'Souza hails from Olavakkode, Palakkad, Kerala, born on 2 April 1974, in Bangalore into a Hindu family as Ramesh Gopi Nair to Gopi Nair, a NC(E) in the Indian Air Force, and Madhaviyamma, a housewife. He has an elder brother, Ganesh, and four sisters. During his school days, he was an athlete and won prizes in the 100 meter race.

D'Souza completed his schooling at the Air Force School, Jamnagar, Gujarat. He completed his 12th from there and during his HSC board exam, he realized that he didn't have any interest in studies. He immediately left school and went to Mumbai, but his father wanted him to join the Indian Air Force. Whatever he has learned about dance until now is on his own. He learned to dance by watching movies, music videos, etc. He would rather say Michael Jackson is his guru as he used to copy his steps watching his dance on the television and then choreograph his own steps by adding something extra.

D'Souza is married to Lizelle Watkins (now D'Souza), an Anglo-Indian from Mumbai. After converting to Christianity, he changed his name to Remo D'Souza. Lizelle is a costume designer who has worked on various television shows, designing costumes. The couple has two sons named Dhruv and Gabriel. Currently, D'Souza and his family reside in Andheri West, Mumbai. Lizelle also collaborates with him and assists him in various projects.

On 11 December 2020, D'Souza suffered a heart attack and was admitted to the ICU of Kokilaben Hospital, Mumbai. Soon, he recovered and got discharged.

== Career ==
D'Souza is a choreographer in Bollywood films and music videos. He has choreographed a number of films. Remo made his television debut with the dance reality show Dance India Dance (DID) along with choreographer Terence Lewis and Geeta Kapoor as judges and mentors. They trained 18 contestants in dance form of ballet, acrobatics, mid-air dancing, contemporary, Bollywood and hip-hop. He made his directorial debut with the comedy film F.A.L.T.U, which received a positive response from critics.

Remo's next directorial venture was the coming-of-age 3D dance-based film ABCD: Any Body Can Dance which starring Prabhu Deva, Dharmesh Yelande, Lauren Gottlieb, Salman Yusuff Khan and Punit Pathak. ABCD received positive reviews from critics and the film's soundtrack also received positive response from critics.

In 2015, Remo directed the second installment of the ABCD Franchise, titled Disney's ABCD 2. It stars Varun Dhawan, Shraddha Kapoor, Prabhu Deva, Raghav Juyal, Lauren Gottlieb, Dharmesh Yelande and Punit Pathak, the film explores the career journey of Suresh and Vernon of the "fictitious dance crew" Kings United India, who went on to win the World Hip Hop Dance Championship in San Diego. The film received positive reviews from critics and the film's soundtrack also received a positive response from critics.

Later, he appeared on (season 4–7) of Jhalak Dikhhla Jaa with the Indian actress Madhuri Dixit and director Karan Johar. He was also the "super judge" on the prime time dance show Dance Plus on Star Plus, along with host Raghav Juyal and team captains Dharmesh Yelande, Shakti Mohan, and Punit Pathak.

In 2016, Remo directed A Flying Jatt, It was released on 24 August 2016, which starring Tiger Shroff, Jacqueline Fernandez, and Nathan Jones. The film tells the story of an ordinary man (Shroff) who gains superpowers. The film received mixed reviews from critics and Anupama Chopra from the Hindustan Times gave the film 1.5 stars out of 5 and said "The first half of A Flying Jatt has moments of fun – I loved that despite being a superhero he has a fear of heights, so he flies very close to the ground. But post-interval, laughter takes a back seat.

Later, he judged the (season 2–3) of Dance Plus along with host Raghav Juyal and team captains Dharmesh Yelande, Shakti Mohan, and Punit Pathak. He then appeared as a judge on the reality show Dance Champions opposite Terence Lewis.

He also directed Race 3 the film featured Salman Khan, Anil Kapoor, Bobby Deol, Jacqueline Fernandez, Daisy Shah, Saqib Saleem and Freddy Daruwala. Race 3 was an internationally mounted saga of a family that deals in borderline crime. It was released on 15 June 2018 coinciding with Eid Though the movie received negative reviews, it was a box office success collecting over ₹178.98 crores in India and approximately ₹303 crores worldwide.

D'Souza judged (season 4-5) of Dance Plus along with host Raghav Juyal, Sugandha Mishra (co-host on season 4 and guest in season 5) and team captains Dharmesh Yelande, Shakti Mohan (season 4), Suresh Mukund (season 5 and to be continued), Karishma Chawan (season 5 and to be continued), and Punit Pathak.

In 2020, Remo directed the third installment of the ABCD Franchise titled Street Dancer 3D which retained some of original casts including Varun Dhawan, Shraddha Kapoor, Prabhu Deva, Raghav Juyal, Dharmesh Yelande, Punit Pathak and added Nora Fatehi, Salman Yusuff Khan and Vartika Jha. The film tells the story of two rival dance groups, despise each other and participate in a dance battle. Later, they decide to join hands for a greater cause. It was released on 24 January 2020 and received positive reviews from critics. The film has a worldwide gross collection of ₹102 crores and the film's soundtrack also received a positive response from critics.

== Awards ==
Film awards
Year	Film	Award	Category	Result	Ref.
2004	Tehzeeb	Zee Cine Awards	Best Choreography	Nominated	
2011	Enthiran	Vijay Awards	Best Find of the Year	Won	
2013	Student of the Year	Zee Cine Awards	Best Choreography (For the song "Disco Deewane")	Nominated	
2014	Yeh Jawaani Hai Deewani	Screen Awards	Best Choreography (for the song "Badtameez Dil")	Won	
2014	Yeh Jawaani Hai Deewani	Zee Cine Awards	Best Choreography (for the song "Badtameez Dil")	Won	
2014	Yeh Jawaani Hai Deewani	International Indian Film Academy Awards	Best Choreography (for the song "Badtameez Dil")	Won	
2014	Yeh Jawaani Hai Deewani	Producer's Guild Film Awards	Best Choreography (for the song "Badtameez Dil")	Won	
2014	Yeh Jawaani Hai Deewani	Producer's Guild Film Awards	Best Choreography (for the song "Balam Pichkari")	Won	
2016	Anybody Can Dance 2	BIG Star Entertainment Awards	Most Entertaining Social Film	Won	
2016	Anybody Can Dance 2	Stardust Awards	Best Choreography (for all songs of ABCD 2)	Won	
2016	Anybody Can Dance 2	Screen Awards	Best Choreography (for the song "Sunn Saathiya")	Won	
2016	Bajirao Mastani	63rd National Film Awards	Best Choreography (for the song "Deewani Mastani")	Won	
2016	Bajirao Mastani	International Indian Film Academy Awards	Best Choreography (for the song "Deewani Mastani")	Won	
2016	Bajirao Mastani	Producer's Guild Film Awards	Best Choreography (for the song "Pinga")	Won	
2016	Bajirao Mastani	Producer's Guild Film Awards	Best Choreography (for the song "Deewani Mastani")	Nominated	
2016	Bajirao Mastani	Zee Cine Awards	Best Choreography (for the song "Deewani Mastani")	Nominated	
2016	Bajirao Mastani	64th Filmfare Awards	Best Choreography (for the song "Deewani Mastani")	Nominated	
2016	Bajirao Mastani	64th Filmfare Awards	Best Choreography (for the song "Pinga")	Nominated	
2020	Kalank	65th Filmfare Awards	Best Choreography (For the song "Ghar More Pardesiya")	Won	

Television awards
Year	Show	Award	Category	Result	Ref.
2013	Jhalak Dikhhla Jaa	Colors Golden Petal Awards	Best Non-Fiction Judge	Nominated	

== Filmography ==
=== As director and producer ===
Year	Title	Director	Producer	Notes
2007	Lal Pahare'r Katha	Yes	No	Bengali film
2011	F.A.L.T.U	Yes	No	
2013	ABCD: Any Body Can Dance	Yes	No	
2014	DOA: Death of Amar	No	Yes	
2015	ABCD 2	Yes	No	
2016	A Flying Jatt	Yes	Yes	
2018	Race 3	Yes	No	
2018	Nawabzaade	No	Yes	
2020	Street Dancer 3D	Yes	Yes	
2021	Time to Dance	No	Yes	
2025	Be Happy	Yes	No	

=== Acting credits ===
Year	Title	Role	Notes
1997	Pardes	Dancer in the song "Meri Mehbooba"	Uncredited
1997	Aflatoon	Raja's friend	
2004	Meenaxi: A Tale of Three Cities	Kameshwar's friend	
2014	Entertainment	Himself	Cameo appearance
2018	Zero	Himself	Cameo appearance
2024	Madgaon Express	Dr. Danny	

=== As choreographer ===
Year	Title
2000	Dil Pe Mat Le Yaar
2001	Tum Bin
2001	Ehsaas: The Feeling
2002	Pitaah
2002	Aankhen
2002	Chhal
2002	Road
2002	Yeh Kya Ho Raha Hai?
2002	Kaante
2002	Saathiya
2003	Aapko Pehle Bhi Kahin Dekha Hai
2003	Stumped
2003	Qayamat: City Under Threat
2003	Janasheen
2003	Mumbai Matinee
2003	Tehzeeb
2003	Wrong Number
2003	Chameli
2004	Meenaxi: A Tale of Three Cities
2004	Bardaasht
2004	Asambhav
2004	Dhoom
2004	Popcorn Khao! Mast Ho Jao
2004	Daag - Shades of Love
2005	Shabd
2005	Lucky: No Time for Love
2005	Naam Gum Jaayega
2005	Waqt: The Race Against Time
2005	Jo Bole So Nihaal
2005	Chocolate
2005	Koi Aap Sa
2005	Ek Khiladi Ek Haseena
2005	Apaharan
2006	Aksar
2006	Fight Club - Members Only
2006	36 China Town
2006	Ankahee
2006	Alag: He Is Different.... He Is Alone...
2006	Bas Ek Pal
2006	Anthony Kaun Hai?
2006	Jaane Hoga Kya
2006	Dil Diya Hai
2006	Pyaar Ke Side Effects
2006	Rocky - The Rebel
2006	Hota Hai Dil Pyaar Mein Paagal
2006	Apna Sapna Money Money
2006	Aryan
2006	Tom Dick And Harry
2007	Marigold
2007	Just Married
2007	Delhii Heights
2007	Good Boy, Bad Boy
2007	The Train
2007	MP3: Mera Pehla Pehla Pyaar
2007	Awarapan
2007	Cash
2007	Darling
2007	Chhodon Naa Yaar
2007	Speed
2007	Main Rony Aur Jony
2008	Mithya
2008	Singh Is Kinng
2008	Bhoothnath
2008	De Taali
2008	Mission Istaanbul
2008	Ugly Aur Pagli
2008	Rock On!!
2008	Hijack
2008	Kidnap
2008	Sorry Bhai!
2008	Maharathi
2009	The Stoneman Murders
2009	Kal Kissne Dekha
2009	London Dreams
2009	Mr. Fraud
2010	Enthiran
2011	Patiala House
2011	F.A.L.T.U
2011	Pyaar Ka Punchnama
2011	Kucch Luv Jaisaa
2011	Bbuddah... Hoga Terra Baap
2011	Stand By
2011	Love Breakups Zindagi
2011	Loot
2012	Student of the Year
2013	ABCD: Any Body Can Dance
2013	Zila Ghaziabad
2013	Aurangzeb
2013	Besharam
2013	Krrish 3
2013	Gori Tere Pyaar Mein
2013	Yeh Jawaani Hai Deewani
2014	Dedh Ishqiya
2014	2 States
2014	Jai Ho
2014	Entertainment
2014	O Teri
2014	Familywala
2015	Tevar
2015	ABCD 2
2015	Bajrangi Bhaijaan
2015	Bajirao Mastani
2015	Dilwale
2016	A Flying Jatt
2018	Race 3
2018	Zero
2019	Kalank
2019	Student of the Year 2
2020	Street Dancer 3D
2021	Time To Dance
2023	Rocky Aur Rani Kii Prem Kahaani
2025	Tu Meri Main Tera Main Tera Tu Meri
2026	Rahu Ketu
2026	Raja Shivaji

=== Television ===
Year	Show	Note(s)
2009	Dance India Dance Season 1	Judge
2009	Dance India Dance Season 2	Judge
2010	Jhalak Dikhhla Jaa 4	Judge
2010	Dance India Dance Doubles	Guest Judge
2011	Dance Ke Superstars	Judge
2011	Dance India Dance Season 3	Judge
2012	Jhalak Dikhhla Jaa 5	Judge
2012	Comedy Circus Ke Ajoobe	Guest
2012	Nach Baliye 5	Guest & Judge
2013	Jhalak Dikhhla Jaa 6	Judge
2014	Jhalak Dikhhla Jaa 7	Judge
2015	Dance Plus	Judge
2016	Dance Plus 2	Judge
2017	Dance Plus Season 3	Judge
2017	Dance Champions	Judge
2018	Dance Plus Season 4	Judge
2019	Dance Plus 5	Judge
2020	India's Best Dancer	Guest/Judge
2021	Dance Dance Junior Season 2	Guest Judge (Grand Finale)
2021	Dance Plus 6	Judge
2022	DID Little Master Season 5	Grand Master
2022	DID Super Moms	Grand Master
2023	India's Best Dancer Season 3	Guest judge
2023	Hip Hop India	Judge
2023	Dance Plus Pro	Super Judge

== Music videos ==
Year	Title	Singer(s)	Ref.
2015	GF BF Song	Gurinder Seagal, Jacqueline Fernandez	
2017	Baby Marvake Maanegi	Raftaar	
2018	Main Hua Tera	Avitesh Shrivastava	
2019	The Chamiya Song	DJ Bravo, Rimi Nique, Gaurav Dagaonkar	
2020	Swag Se Solo	Sachet Sandon, Tanishk Bagchi	
2020	Saaton Janam	Ishan Khan, Shambhavi Thakur	
2020	Dil Na Todunga	Abhi Dutt	
2020	Baby Girl	Guru Randhawa, Dhvani Bhanushali	
2020	Log Kya Kahenge	Abhinav Shekhar	
2021	Vande Mataram	Tiger Shroff	
2022	Nach Babe	Sunny Leone	
