= Dance Plus =

Indian Dance Reality Show

- D+ logo
- Also known as: Dance +
- Directed by: Ashim Sen
- Presented by: Raghav Juyal (host for season 1-6); Sugandha Mishra (co-host in season 4 & guest for 5-6); Sushant Khatri (co-host in season 7); Tushar Shetty (co-host in season 7)
- Judges: Remo D'Souza
- Country of origin: India
- Original language: Hindi
- No. of seasons: 7
- No. of episodes: 146

Production
- Producers: Hemant Ruprell; Ranjeet Thakur; Adelaide Joshua-Hill
- Editor: Kumar Priyadarshi
- Running time: 60 minutes (season 1-2) 90 minutes (season 3-4) 120 minutes (season 5-7)
- Production companies: Frames Production; House pvt Ltd; Urban Brew Studios

Original release
- Network: Star Plus; Disney+ Hotstar
- Release: 26 July 2015 – present

Dance Plus (tagline: Ise Kehte Hain Dance) is an Indian Hindi-language reality dance competition television series produced by Frames Production house and Urban Brew Studios. The 6 consecutive seasons hosted by Raghav Juyal. From season 7 Tushar Shetty & Sushant Khatri co-host. The series features dance performers, including solo acts, Duo and larger groups, representing any style of dance, competing for a grand prize.

== Series overview ==
Season	Episodes	Finalists		Winner Team	Host		Super Judge	Captains				Original Broadcast		Network
Season	Episodes	Winner	Runner-up	Winner Team	Host		Super Judge	Captains				Premiere	Finale	Network
1	12	V Company	Question Mark Crew	Dharmesh Yelande	Raghav Juyal	—N/a	Remo D'Souza	Dharmesh Yelande	Shakti Mohan	Sumeet Nagdev	No 4th captain	26 July 2015	11 October 2015	Star Plus & Disney Plus Hotstar
2	26	Tanay Malhara	Wild Ripperz	Dharmesh Yelande	Raghav Juyal	—N/a	Remo D'Souza	Dharmesh Yelande	Shakti Mohan	Punit Pathak	No 4th captain	2 July 2016	25 September 2016	Star Plus & Disney Plus Hotstar
3	26	Bir Radha Sherpa	Amardeep Singh Natt	Punit Pathak	Raghav Juyal	—N/a	Remo D'Souza	Dharmesh Yelande	Shakti Mohan	Punit Pathak	No 4th captain	1 July 2017	24 September 2017	Star Plus & Disney Plus Hotstar
4	34	Chetan Salunke	Sujan and Aanchal	Punit Pathak	Raghav Juyal	Sugandha Mishra	Remo D'Souza	Dharmesh Yelande	Shakti Mohan	Punit Pathak	No 4th captain	6 October 2018	2 February 2019	Star Plus & Disney Plus Hotstar
5	31	Janam Crew	Rupesh Bane	Dharmesh Yelande	Raghav Juyal	Sugandha Mishra	Remo D'Souza	Dharmesh Yelande	Karishma Chavan	Punit Pathak	Suresh Mukund	9 November 2019	22 February 2020	Star Plus & Disney Plus Hotstar
6	25	Harsh, Sneha & Tejas	Dhananjay Joshi	Shakti Mohan	Raghav Juyal	Sugandha Mishra	Remo D'Souza	Salman Yusuff Khan	Shakti Mohan	Punit Pathak	No 4th captain	13 September 2021	15 October 2021	Star Plus & Disney Plus Hotstar
Pro	49	Ritesh Pal	Rakesh Sahu	Shakti Mohan	Tushar Shetty	Sushant Khatri	Remo D'Souza	Rahul Shetty	Shakti Mohan	Punit Pathak	No 4th captain	11 December 2023	29 February 2024	Star Plus & Disney Plus Hotstar

== Judges and captains ==
Judge
Judge	1	2	3	4	5	6	7
Remo D'Souza	Super Judge	Super Judge	Super Judge	Super Judge	Super Judge	Super Judge	Super Judge
Dharmesh Yelande	Captain	Captain	Captain	Captain	Captain		
Shakti Mohan	Captain	Captain	Captain	Captain		Captain	Captain
Punit Pathak		Captain	Captain	Captain	Captain	Captain	Captain
Rahul Shetty							Captain
Salman Yusuff Khan						Captain	
Karishma Chavan					Captain		
Sumeet Nagdev	Captain						
Suresh Mukund					Captain		
Seasons captains.	3				4	3	

== Season 1 ==
Season 1 of Dance Plus premiered on 26 July 2015. V Company from Team Dharmesh won Season 1, Question Mark Crew from Team Sumeet was first runner up and Hardik Rawat from Team Dharmesh was second runner up. Kumar Priyadarshi is one of the editor of this season of Dance Plus.

=== Teams ===
Team Dharmesh	Team Shakti	Team Sumeet
Hardik Rawat - Solo	Popin Ticko - Solo	Dharmendra - akela
Ravi & Bhargav - Duo	Rahul Barman - Solo	Nadeem - Solo
Shafad and Arafat - Duo	Piyush & Preeti - Duo	Chandni & Gaurav - Duo
Bindaas Faizi, replaced by Piyush - Solo	13.13 Crew - Group	Base Crew - Group
V Company - Group	Banjara Girls - Group	Question Mark Crew - Group

== Season 2 ==
Season 2 of Dance Plus started on 2 July 2016. The auditions took place across several cities of India from 3 May 2016 to 26 May 2016.Tanay Malhara from Team Dharmesh won the second season.

There are three mentors:

- Dharmesh Yelande
- Shakti Mohan
- Punit Pathak

Teams

Team Dharmesh	Team Shakti	Team Punit
Yo Highness	Piyush Bhagat	Shazia Samji
Tanay Malhara	Sushant Khatri (Nepal)	Urban Singh Crew
Wild Ripperz Crew (Nepali Crew)	B.A.N.D.I.T.S. Crew	F.A.M.O.U.S Crew
Mokshada Jail Khaani replaced by Bindaas Faizi	X1X Crew	Mingma Lepcha

== Season 3 ==
Season 3 of Dance Plus started on 1 July 2017. Bir Radha Sherpa of Team Punit won the third season.

Judges:

- Dharmesh Yelande
- Shakti Mohan
- Punit Pathak

=== Teams ===
Team Dharmesh	Team Shakti	Team Punit
Aryan Patra	Chow En Lai Phukan	Bir Radha Sherpa
Tarun & Shivani	Sri Rama Nataka Nikethan	Ayush & Mukesh
Amardeep Singh Natt	Nostalgia Crew	A.V.P. Crew
Tuttix Crew	Jeet Das	House of Suraj

== Season 4 ==
Season 4 of Dance Plus was started from 6 October 2018 Saturday at 8 pm. The channel Star Plus released the first promo of the show. It was hosted by Raghav Juyal and Sugandha Mishra. Chetan Salunkhe of Team Punit won the fourth season.

The Super Judge was Remo D'souza. The other judges were:

- Dharmesh Yelande
- Shakti Mohan
- Punit Pathak

=== Team Raghav Juyal ===
An all-kids crew named S-Unity Crew made a special appearance on the show as Team Raghav. They later shifted to Team Dharmesh after getting into the top 10.

== Season 5 ==
Season 5 of Dance Plus started airing from 9 November 2019 at 8 pm, hosted by Raghav Juyal and Sugandha mishra (as guest). Rupesh bane from team Dharmesh became the winner of season 5. Janam from team Punit became the runner-up of season 5

The Super Judge is Remo D'Souza. The other judges are:

- Dharmesh Yelande
- Karishma Chavan
- Punit Pathak
- Suresh Mukund

Contestant Info

- Winner
- Runner-up
- Third place
- Fourth place
- Eliminated in the Semi Finale
- Eliminated in Race to Top 10
- Finalist

Captains	Top 18				
Dharmesh	Rupesh Bane	Nritya Kala Kendra	Naitik Singhal	Dynamic Dance Crew	
Punit	Janam Crew	Subrato and Sanchita	Bhim Bahadur	Sameep Dhakne	
Karishma	Deepika and Rupesh	Candybots	Jahangir Alam	B-Fab Crew	Creative Dance Crew
Suresh	Monark Trivedi	Tron Brothers	The Ace	Siba Prasad	Suraj and Priyanka

== Season 6 ==
The sixth season aired on 13 September 2021 on Disney+ Hotstar. The show hosted by Raghav Juyal with the super judge Remo D'Souza and the team captains are Punit Pathak, Shakti Mohan and Salman Yusuff Khan. Harsh, Tejas, Sneha from team Shakti won Season 6 (in all of her 5 seasons of being a captain, this is the first win of team Shakti).

Contestant info

Teams color key
Winner
Runner-up
Third place
Eliminated in Race to Top 6
Eliminated in Semi Finale

Captains	Top 15				
Punit	Kuldeep and Pranshu	Pratik Surve	Romsha Singh	Shivanshu Soni	Hot Indians Crew
Shakti	Harsh, Tejas, Sneha	Dhananjay Joshi	Shweta Sharda	PS2	J.S Angels
Salman	Rohan Parkale	Ajay and Sara	Tom and Jerry	MD Hasan Raja	N House Crew

== Season 7 ==
Dance Plus Pro features Shakti Mohan, Punit Pathak returning as captains Rahul Shetty as a new captain. Remo D'Souza returns as the super judge. The show will be newly hosted by Sushant Khatri and Tushar Shetty.

Teams

Contestant info

Teams color key
Winner
Runner-up
Third place
Eliminated in Race to Top 8
Eliminated in Semi Finale

Captains	Top 12			
Punit	Rakesh Sahu	Brother's Bond Crew	Ritika Sharma (Replaced Sanhvi Jaiswal)	The Mystique
Shakti	Ritesh Pal	Ashish & Himanshu	Aman & Kunal	The Trend
Rahul	Ram, Ramesh & Kishan	Anshika Dhara (replaced ADA Trio)	Akanksha Priyodarshoni	Aviral & Parv

=== Dance Styles of Teams ===
Sr.	Artists	Type	Style	Team
1	Brother's Bond Crew	Group	Lyrical	Punit
2	Rakesh Sahu	Solo	Contemporary	Punit
3	The Mystique	Group	Waacking	Punit
4	Ritika Sharma	Solo	Hip-Hop	Punit
5	Ritesh Pal	Solo	Contemporary	Shakti
6	Ashish & Himanshu	Duo	Lyrical	Shakti
7	The Trend	Group	K-pop	Shakti
8	Aman & Kunal	Duo	Hip-Hop	Shakti
9	Ram, Ramesh & Kishan	Trio	B-Boying	Rahul
10	Anshika Dhara	Solo	Popping	Rahul
11	Akanksha Priyodarshoni	Solo	Freestyle	Rahul
12	Aviral & Parv	Duo	Lyrical	Rahul

== Season 8 ==
Dance Plus Pro 2 Upcoming Season

TBA

== See also ==
- Dance Champions
- Dance India Dance
