= Dance Plus season 3 =

Dance Plus
- Season 3
- Hosted by: Raghav Juyal
- Judges: Remo D'Souza
- Coaches: Dharmesh Yelande; Shakti Mohan; Punit Pathak
- No. of contestants: 12
- Winner: Bir Radha Sherpa
- Winning mentor: Punit Pathak
- Runner-up: Amardeep Singh Natt
- Finals venue: Mumbai

Release
- Original network: Star Plus
- Original release: 1 July – 24 September 2017

Season chronology
- ← Previous; Season 2 Next → Season 4

Season 3 of Dance Plus tag line ek level up started on 1 July 2017 on STAR Plus and produced by Urban Brew Studios. Winner was Bir Radha Sherpa, from team Punit. Other three contestants from Top four were from Dharmesh's team, a new record for the finalists. Amardeep Singh Natt became the first runner up, Aryan Patra became the second runner up and Shivani and Tarun were the third runner up. All the finalists won the hearts of public with their entertaining and excellent performances. Overall, Team Dharmesh has two winners from season one and two, Team Punit has one and Shakti Mohan has none. Show is acclaimed and very popular due to creative format and uniqueness.

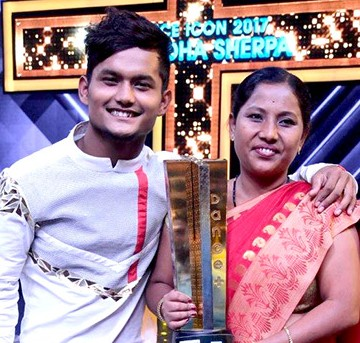
This season's winner Bir Radha Sherpa.

== Super judge ==
Remo D'Souza is the super judge for this season also. He is a well known and reputed choreographer and film director. He directed movies like F.A.L.T.U., Any Body Can Dance (ABCD and ABCD 2), A Flying Jatt and Race 3. He was also judge on Jhalak Dikhla Ja and Dance India Dance (seasons 1, 2 and 3).

== Captains ==
There are three captains on the show.

- Dharmesh Yelande
- Shakti Mohan
- Punit Pathak

Each mentor has their own team consisting of contestants selected in auditions. There will be one final winner at the end of the show.

Urban Brew Studios produces the first, second and third seasons of Dance+ on STAR Plus.

== Scoring ==
Each captain will give a challenge to one artist each from the other two teams. The challenges are:

- Theme round
- Prop round
- Best foot forward

The captain who gave the challenge can score out of five and the super judge can score out of ten. The super judge can also give five additional points.

The fourth round is the international squad challenge in which one member of each team has to match the level of dancing of the international dancer. This round is also scored out of ten by the super judge and he can give an additional five points.

Based on the scores of these rounds, two teams go to the final showdown. The fourth artist from each team performs and the super judge chooses the winner. The winning team's captain nominates two artists from his or her team to go forward and the super judge chooses the artist who will go to top eight.

== Top twelve artists ==
Team Dharmesh
Sr.	Artists	Type	Style	Home town
1	Tarun and Shivani	Duo	Contemporary	Tarun Nihalani from Nasik; Shivani Patel from Ahmedabad
2	Amardeep Singh Natt	Solo	Robotics	Mumbai
3	The Tuttix Crew	Group	Tutting	Mumbai
4	Aryan Patra	Solo	Krumping	Ranchi

Team Shakti
Sr.	Artists	Type	Style	Home town
1	Nostalgia	Trio (Gavin, Nicky, Leo)	Rhythmic Beat Kill	Mangalore
2	Sri Rama Nataka Niketan	Group	Bharatanatyam	Hyderabad
3	Chow En Lai Phukan	Solo	Contemporary	Guwahati
4	Jeet Das	Solo	Bollywood	Kolkata

Team Punit
Sr.	Artists	Type	Style	Home town
1	Bir Radha Sherpa	Solo	B-Boying and Contemporary	Silchar, Assam
2	House of Suraj	Group	Waacking	Los Angeles
3	AVP Crew	Trio	Freestyle and Hip-Hop	Pune
4	Ayush & Mukesh	Duo	Contemporary	Kolkata

== International squad challenge ==
In Dance plus season 3, D'Souza added a new challenge for dancers. Here he will invite an international dance artist every week.

Remo's international squad
Sr.	Artist(s)	Type	Style	Home town	Known for	Episode
1	Du-Shaunt '"Fik-Shun" Stegall	Solo	Hip-hop	Las Vegas, United States	Winner of So You Think You Can Dance (U.S. season 10)	July 23–24
2	Paul Karmiryan & Brittany Cherry	Duo	Latin dance	Los Angeles, United States	So You Think You Can Dance (U.S. season 10)	July 29–30
3	Dytto	Solo	Tutting, animation, slow motion, robotic dance	Los Angeles, United States	World of Dance	August 5–6
4	Pandit Birju Maharaj's Group	Cultural	Kathak	Lucknow, India	Kalidas Samman	August 12–13
5	Philippine All Stars	Group	Hip-hop	Manila, Philippines	Champions of World Hip Hop Dance Championship (2006, 2008 & 2009 seasons)	August 19–20

== Top eight artists ==
Top 8
Sr.	Artists	Type	Style	Team	Episode
1	Aryan Patra	Solo	Krumping	Dharmesh	July 24
2	Ayush & Mukesh	Duo	Contemporary	Punit	July 30
3	AVP Crew	Trio	Hip-hop	Punit	August 6
4	Sri Rama Nataka Niketan	Group	Bharatanatyam	Shakti	August 13
5	Amardeep Singh Natt	Solo	Robotics	Dharmesh	August 20
6	Bir Radha Sherpa	Solo	Bir Style (B-Boying & Contemporary)	Punit	August 27
7	Tarun and Shivani	Duo	Contemporary	Dharmesh	August 27
8	House of Suraj	Group	Waacking	Punit	August 27

== Top four artists ==
Top 4
Sr.	Artists	Type	Style	Team	Episode
1	Bir Radha Sherpa	Solo	Bir Style (B-Boying & Contemporary)	Punit	September 9
2	Tarun and Shivani	Duo	Contemporary	Dharmesh	September 9
3	Amardeep Singh Natt	Solo	Robotics	Dharmesh	September 16
4	Aryan Patra	Solo	Krumping	Dharmesh	September 16

== Special guests ==
Special Guest Appearances
Sr.	Guest(s)	Reason	Episode
1	Shah Rukh Khan and Imtiaz Ali	Promoting their film Jab Harry Met Sejal	29–30 July
2	Akshay Kumar and Bhumi Pednekar	Promoting their film Toilet: Ek Prem Katha	12 August
3	Ayushmann Khurrana, Kriti Sanon and Rajkummar Rao	Promoting their film Bareilly Ki Barfi	19–20 August
4	Sidharth Malhotra and Jacqueline Fernandez	Promoting their film A Gentleman	26 August
5	Mithali Raj and Harmanpreet Kaur	Indian Women Cricketers	27 August
6	Govinda	Indian 1990s Dance Icon	2 September
7	Sunny Deol, Bobby Deol and Shreyas Talpade	Promoting their film Poster Boys	9 September
8	Shraddha Kapoor, Siddhanth Kapoor and Ankur Bhatia	Promoting their film Haseena Parkar	10 September
9	Kangana Ranaut	Promoting her film Simran	16 September
10	Farah Khan	Promoting her show Lip Sing Battle	16 September
11	Tiger Shroff	Special Appearance	17 September
12	Terence Lewis	Special Appearance	17 September
13	Varun Dhawan, Taapsee Pannu and Jacqueline Fernandez	Promoting their film Judwaa 2	23 September
14	Prabhu Deva	Special Appearance	24 September

== See also ==
- List of dance style categories
- Dance Plus
- Dance Plus (season 2)
