= Dance Plus season 5 =

Indian reality show season

Dance Plus
- Season 5
- Hosted by: Raghav Juyal
- Judges: Remo D'Souza
- Coaches: Dharmesh Yelande; Punit Pathak; Karishma Chavan; Suresh Mukund
- No. of contestants: 18
- Winner: Rupesh
- Winning mentor: Dharmesh Yelande
- Runner-up: Janam

Release
- Original network: Star Plus
- Original release: 9 November 2019 – 22 February 2020

Season chronology
- ← Previous; Season 4 Next → Season 6

Season 5 of Dance Plus (tag line Undekha, Unsuna & Unbelievable) started 9 November 2019 on Star Plus and is produced by Urban Brew Studios in association with Frames Productions. The season is hosted by Raghav Juyal.

== Super judge ==
Remo D'Souza, the super judge, is an Indian dancer, choreographer, actor and film director.

== Captains ==
The following are the four captains of the season.

- Dharmesh Yelande
- Punit Pathak
- Karishma chavan
- Suresh Mukund

== Teams ==
Contestant info

- Winner
- Runner-up
- Third place
- Fourth place
- Eliminated in the Semi Finale
- Eliminated in Race to Top 10

Captains	Top 18				
Dharmesh	Rupesh Bane	Nritya Kala Kendra	Naitik Singhal	Dynamic Dance Crew	
Punit	Janam Crew	Subrato and Sanchita	Bhim Bahadur	Sameep Dhakne	
Karishma	Deepika and Rupesh	Candybots	Jahangir Alam	B-Fab Crew	Creative Dance Crew
Suresh	Monark Trivedi	Tron Brothers	The Ace	Siba Prasad	Suraj and Priyanka

== Dance styles of team ==
Team Dharmesh Yelande
Sr.	Artists	Type	Style
1	Dynamic Dance Crew	Group	Hip-Hop
2	Naitik Singhal	Solo	Popping
3	Rupesh Bane	Solo	Contemporary
4	Nritya Kala Kendra	Group	Bharatanatyam

Team Punit Pathak
Sr.	Artists	Type	Style
1	Bhim Bahadur	Solo	Lyrical
2	Janam Crew	Group	Lyrical
3	Subroto and Sanchita	Duo	Contemporary
4	Sameep Dhakne	Solo	Popping

Team Karishma Chavan
Sr.	Artists	Type	Style
1	Creative Dance Crew	Group	Locking and Hip-Hop
2	Deepika and Rupesh	Duo	Robotics
3	Jahangir Alam	Solo	Contemporary
4	B-Fab Crew	Group	Lyrical

Team Suresh Mukund
Sr.	Artists	Type	Style
1	Monark Trivedi	Solo	B-Boying
2	Tron Brothers	Duo	Animation
3	Siba Prasad	Solo	Popping
4	Suraj and Priyanka	Duo	Contemporary
5	The Ace	Group	Urban Choreography

== International squad challenge ==
From Dance plus season 3, D'Souza added a new challenge for dancers. Here he will invite an international dance artist every week.

Remo's international squad
Sr.	Artist(s)	Type	Style	Home town	Known for	Episode
1	Les Twins	Duo	Hip-hop	Sarcelles, Val d'Oise, France	Winner of World of Dance (season 1)	30 Nov – 1 Dec
2	V.Unbeatable	Crew	Hip-hop	India	Winner of America's Got Talent: The Champions (Season 2), 4th position in America's Got Talent (season 14) & Finalist Dance Plus (season 4)	7 Dec – 8 Dec
3	Eva Igo	Solo	Contemporary	Inver Grove Heights, Minnesota, United States	Runners up World of Dance (season 1)	14 Dec – 15 Dec
4	Philip Chbeeb (Pacman) and Makenzie Dustman	Duo	Contemporary	Tomball, Texas, United States	So You Think You Can Dance and Step Up	21 Dec – 22 Dec
5	GiJoo Kim(Bboypocket)	Solo	Bboying	Seoul, Gyeonggi province, South Korea	A member of Heima Division Finals World of Dance (season 3)	28 Dec – 29 Dec
6	Kings United	Crew	Hip-hop	India	Winner of World of Dance (season 3)	4-5 Jan

== Top 10 ==
Sr.	Artists	Type	Style	Home town	Team
1.	Subroto and Sanchita	Duo	Contemporary	Kolkata	Punit Pathak
2.	Deepika and Rupesh	Duo	Popping	Delhi	Karishma Chavan
3.	The Ace	Group	Urban Choreography	All India	Suresh Mukund
4.	Rupesh Bane	Solo	Contemporary	Dombivli	Dharmesh Yelande
5.	Monark Trivedi	Solo	B-Boying	Junagadh	Suresh Mukund
6.	Nritya Kala Kendra	Group	Bharatnatyam	Ahmedabad	Dharmesh Yelande
7.	Janam Crew	Group	Lyrical	Ahmedabad	Punit Pathak
8.	Bhim Bahadur	Solo	Lyrical	Sikkim	Punit Pathak
9.	Candybots	Trio	Popping	Delhi	Karishma Chavan
10.	Tron Brothers	Duo	Animation	Dehradun	Suresh Mukund

== Finalist ==
Sr.	Artists	Type	Style	Home town	Team	Finish
1.	Rupesh Bane	Solo	Contemporary	Dombivli	Dharmesh Yelande	winner
2.	Janam	Group	Lyrical	Ahmedabad	Punit Pathak	1st runner up
3.	Sanchita & Subroto	Duo	Contemporary	Kolkata	Punit Pathak	2nd Runner Up
4.	Deepika & Rupesh	Duo	Popping	Delhi	Karishma Chavan	3rd Runner-Up (Loreal Performer of the season)

== Special guests ==
Special Guest Appearances
Sr.	Guest(s)	Reason	Episode
1	Mithun Chakraborty	Special Appearance	23-24 November
2	Anil Kapoor and Jackie Shroff	Special Appearance	30 November
3	Divya Khosla Kumar	To Promote Her Music Video Yaad Piya Ki Aane Lagi 2	1 December
4	Geeta Kapoor and Terence Lewis	To Celebrate 10 Years Working Together	7-8 December
5	Kartik Aaryan, Bhumi Pednekar and Ananya Pandey	To Promote Their Film Pati Patni Aur Woh	8 December
6	Sunny Deol and Suniel Shetty	Special Appearance	14 December
7	Salman Khan, Sonakshi Sinha, Saiee Manjrekar and Prabhu Deva	To Promote Their Film Dabangg 3	15 December
8	Varun Dhawan and Shraddha Kapoor	To Promote Their Film Street Dancer 3D	21-22 December
9	Deepika Padukone	To Promote Her Film Chhapaak	28 December
10	Nora Fatehi and Prabhu Deva	To Promote Their Film Street Dancer 3D	29 December
11	Sugandha Mishra	Guest Host	4-5 January
12	Ajay Devgn and Kajol	To Promote Their Film Tanhaji	11 January
13	Dhvani Bhanushali	Special Appearance	12 January
14	Kangana Ranaut and Jassi Gill	To Promote Their Film Panga	18-19 January
15	Shah Rukh Khan	Special Appearance	25-26 January
16	Jeetendra	Special Appearance	8-9 February
17	Anil Kapoor, Kunal Khemu, Aditya Roy Kapur and Disha Patani	To Promote Their Film Malang	8-9 February
18	Kartik Aaryan and Sara Ali Khan	To Promote Their Film Love Aaj Kal	15 February
19	Ayushmann Khurrana, Jitendra Kumar, Neena Gupta and Gajraj Rao	To Promote Their Film Shubh Mangal Zyada Saavdhan	16 February
20	Mithun Chakraborty and Dharmendra	Special Appearance	22 February
21	Tiger Shroff, Shraddha Kapoor and Ahmed Khan	To Promote Their Film Baaghi 3	22 February
22	Guru Randhawa	Special Appearance	22 February

== Score chart ==
Captain's info

- Team Dharmesh
- Team Punit
- Team Karishma
- Team Suresh

Contestant Info

- Winner
- Runner-up
- Third place
- Fourth place
- Eliminated in the Semi Finale
- Eliminated in Race to Top 10
- Advanced to Top 10
- Finalist
- Not Performed
- (D) Captain Dharmesh's challenge
- (P) Captain Punit's challenge
- (K) Captain Karishma's challenge
- (S) Captain Suresh's challenge
- (IS) International Squad Round
- (SD) Final Showdown
- (B) Bonus battle

The scores were given in the following manner:
1. Each captain gave a challenge to two teams. One performer from each of the two challenged teams performed. A captain can score out of 10. The performer belonging to that captain cannot give the score. The score were given by the challenger and the non challenged team captain.
2. Remo had a power of giving the score out of 20. Remo also had the power to give double plus to the team and the team got additional 10 points.
3. Second round is the International Squad round. Remo gave the score out of 20. Artists from each team performed. The team whose score is equal to that of the International Squad, got their score doubled for that round.
4. Top two teams with Highest Scores (sum of scores from previous rounds) proceed for the final showdown and the winner is decided by Remo. The team whose artist won the final showdown is the winner of that week.
5. Winning captain chose two performers from their team to advance to Top 10 and Remo chose amongst them.
6. After Top 10 is chosen (8th week onwards), Remo scored out of 20 but he also gave an additional 10 points (double plus). Also, teams can score an additional 10 points after winning bonus battle.

Results per weekScores out of 10/20/30/40/50
Contestants	Race to Top 10							Race to Top 4			Semi Finale			Finale
Episodes	1-2	3-4	5-6	7-8	9-10	11-12	13-14	15-16	17-18	19-20	21-22	23-24	Result	25-26
Rupesh Bane	37 (K)	19 (IS)	39 (K)	W (SD)	40 (S)	40 (P)	Adv	20	NP	30	20	20	Finalist 3	Winner
Janam Crew	35 (S)	40 (IS)	NP	50 (K)	37 (S)	40 (IS)	Adv	30	20	20 + 10(B)	20	20	Finalist 2	Runner-up
Subroto and Sanchita	40 (IS)	L (SD)	34 (K)	40 (IS)	L (SD)	36 (K)	Adv	19	30 + 10(B)	20	20	20	Finalist 1	2nd Runner-up
Deepika and Rupesh	40 (IS)	40 (S)	NP	34 (D)	37 (D)	NP	Adv	20 + 10(B)	19 + 10(B)	20 + 10(B)	30 + 10(B)	20	Finalist 4	3rd Runner-up
Nritya Kala Kendra	34 (P)	NP	40 (IS)	50 (P)	37 (P)	19 (IS)	Adv	19 + 10(B)	20	20 +10(B)	19	__	Eliminated (semi-finale)	
Bhim Bahadur	36 (D)	35 (K)	38 (D)	L (SD)	39 (K)	37 (D)	Adv	19	20	19	20	__	Eliminated (semi-finale)	
Candy Bots	Not in Competition						Adv	19 + 10(B)	20	19 + 10(B)	20	__	Eliminated (semi-finale)	
Monark Trivedi	36 (D)	NP	40 (IS)	40 (IS)	37 (K)	NP	Adv	20	20 + 10(B)	20 + 10(B)	20 + 10(B)	__	Eliminated (semi-finale)	
The Tron Brothers	Not in Competition						Adv	19	19 + 10(B)	19	19 + 10(B)	__	Eliminated (semi-finale)	
The Ace	NP	18 (IS)	50 (D)	40 (K)	40 (D)	19 (IS)	Adv	19 + 10(B)	20 + 10(B)	19 + 10(B)	19 + 10(B)	__	Eliminated (semi-finale)	
Dynamic Dance Crew	NP	34 (S)	38 (S)	40 (IS)	L (SD)	37 (S)	Eliminated (Race to Top 10)							
Naitik Singhal	19 (IS)	35 (P)	L (SD)	40 (S)	18 (IS)	W (SD)	Eliminated (Race to Top 10)							
Sameep Dhakne	W (SD)	34 (D)	18 (IS)	36 (S)	19 (IS)	L (SD)	Eliminated (Race to Top 10)							
Creative Dance Crew	50 (S)	W (SD)	18 (IS)	34 (P)	31 (P)	18 (IS)	Eliminated (Race to Top 10)							
Jahangir Alam	L (SD)	35 (D)	33 (P)	19 (IS)	L (SD)	34 (P)	Eliminated (Race to Top 10)							
B-Fab	35 (P)	19 (IS)	34 (S)	NP	40 (IS)	37 (S)	Eliminated (Race to Top 10)							
Siba Prasad Dash	18 (IS)	37 (P)	W (SD)	40 (D)	W (SD)	33 (K)	Eliminated (Race to Top 10)							
Suraj and Priyanka	36 (K)	33 (K)	31 (P)	NP	18 (IS)	34 (D)	Eliminated (Race to Top 10)							
