= Punit Pathak =

Indian dancer, choreographer and actor (born 1986)

Punit Jayesh Pathak
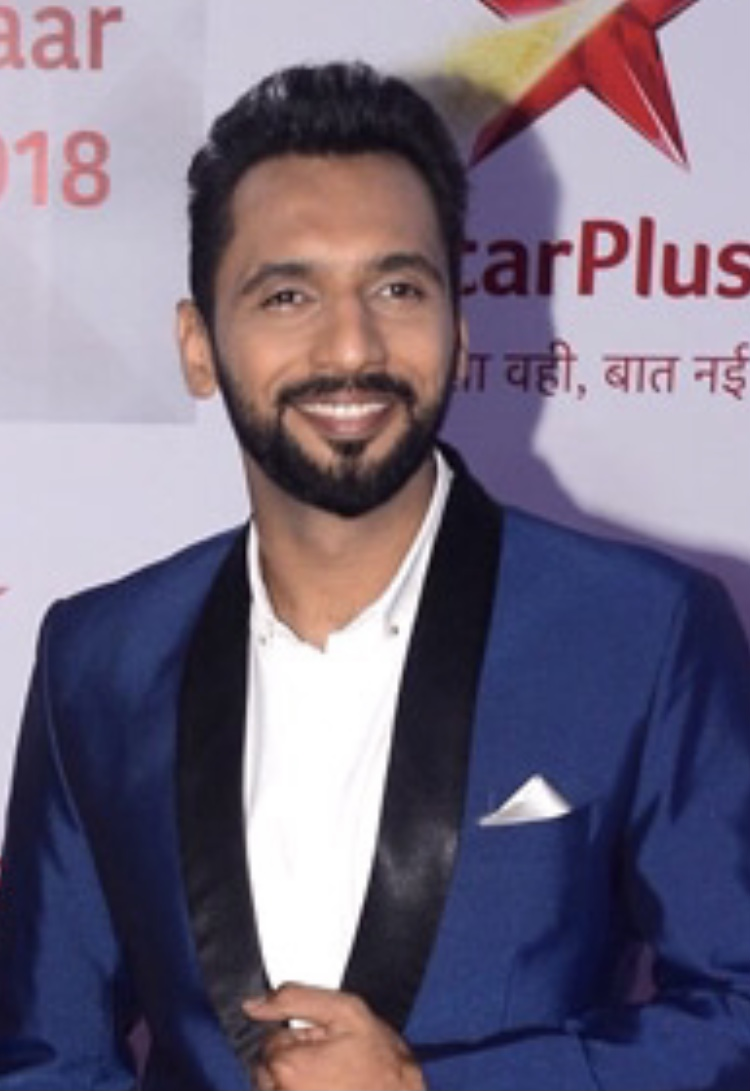
- Pathak in 2018
- Born: Punit Jayesh Pathak; 1 November 1986 (age 39); Bombay, Maharashtra, India
- Occupations: Dancer; choreographer; actor
- Years active: 2009–present
- Spouse: Nidhi Moony Singh Pathak (m. 2020)

Punit Jayesh Pathak (born 1 November 1986) is an Indian dancer, choreographer, and actor.

In 2019, he participated in Colors TV's reality and stunt series Fear Factor: Khatron Ke Khiladi 9 and emerged as the winner.

== Early life ==
Punit Jayesh Pathak was born on 1 November 1986. Initially, he dreamed of becoming a cricketer or a filmmaker, but during college, he developed a passion for dancing. However, his father was opposed to the idea and insisted that Pathak take over the family business, Punit Yarn Agency Private Limited. Eventually, Pathak's younger brother took on the responsibility of running the family business.

== Career ==
In 2009, Pathak participated in the dance reality show Dance India Dance 2, which aired on Zee TV.

In 2013, Pathak debuted as an actor in the 3D dance-based film ABCD: Any Body Can Dance co-starring Dharmesh Yelande, Prabhu Deva and Salman Yusuff Khan. Later, he appeared in the dance reality show Jhalak Dikhhla Jaa as a choreographer. He was the judge of Dance India Dance 5 on Zee TV.

In 2015, Pathak starred in the film, ABCD 2, directed by Remo D'Souza, co-starring Varun Dhawan, Shraddha Kapoor, Prabhu Deva and Raghav Juyal. Later, he became a mentor on the dance reality show Dance Plus. He was also a choreographer in Dance Champions.

In 2018, Pathak starred in the romantic comedy Hindi film Nawabzaade, which was released on 27 July 2018, directed by Jayesh Pradhan and produced by Lizelle D'Souza and Matur K. Barot, co-starring Raghav Juyal, Dharmesh Yelande and Isha Rikhi.

In 2019, Pathak participated in Colors TV's stunt-based reality show Fear Factor: Khatron Ke Khiladi 9 and emerged as the winner. His team also performed in Isha Ambani's sangeet ceremony. He also choreographed the finale performance of the IPL (2019). He was later called as a guest on Khatra Khatra Khatra.

In 2020, Pathak appeared in the dance film Street Dancer 3D which was released on 24 January 2020, directed by Remo D'Souza, co-starring Varun Dhawan, Shraddha Kapoor, Prabhu Deva, Nora Fatehi and Raghav Juyal.

== Filmography ==
Year	Title	Notes
2009–10	Dance India Dance 2	Contestant (2nd runner-up)
2010–11	Jhalak Dikhhla Jaa 4	Choreographer
2012	Dance India Dance 3	Guest
2012	Jhalak Dikhhla Jaa 5	Choreographer
2013	Jhalak Dikhhla Jaa 6	Choreographer
2014	Jhalak Dikhhla Jaa 7	Choreographer
2015	Jhalak Dikhhla Jaa 8	Guest
2015	Dance India Dance 5	Mentor (Winner)
2015	Nach Baliye 7	Guest
2015–16	Aaj Ki Raat Hai Zindagi	Choreographer
2016	Dance Plus 2	Captain
2017	Dil Hai Hindustani	Choreographer
2017	India Banega Manch	Choreographer
2017	Dance Plus 3	Captain (Winner)
2017	Dance Champions	Choreographer
2017	Entertainment Ki Raat	Guest
2018	Dance Plus 4	Captain (Winner)
2018	India's Next Superstars	Choreographer
2018	Dance Deewane	Guest
2018	High Fever	Guest
2018	Sabse Smart Kaun	Guest
2018	Dil Hai Hindustani 2	Guest
2018	Bigg Boss 12	Choreographer
2019	Fear Factor: Khatron Ke Khiladi 9	Contestant (Winner)
2019	Bharti Ka Show	Guest
2019	Khatra Khatra Khatra	Guest
2019	Kitchen Champion 5	Guest
2019	Dance Deewane 2	Guest
2019	Nach Baliye 9	Guest
2019	Dance Plus 5	Captain
2020	Bigg Boss 13	Guest
2020	The Kapil Sharma Show	Guest
2020	India's Best Dancer	Guest
2020	Bigg Boss 14	Guest
2021	Dance Deewane 3	Judge
2021	Dance Plus 6	Captain
2021	Zee Comedy Show	Comedian
2021	Bigg Boss OTT	Guest
2022	The Khatra Khatra Show	Guest
2022	Jhalak Dikhhla Jaa 10	Guest
2023	Entertainment Ki Raat Housefull	Host
2023	Dance Plus Pro	Captain
2024	Srikanth (film)	Choreographer

=== Films ===
Year	Title	Role
2013	ABCD: Any Body Can Dance	Chandu
2015	ABCD 2	Vinod
2018	Nawabzaade	Abhishek
2020	Street Dancer 3D	Inder Singh Narula

=== OTT ===
- 2021 LSD: Love, Scandal and Doctors as Inspector Tavish Singh on ZEE5

== Musicals ==
Year	Musical	Notes
2017	Balle Balle – The Musical	Choreographer
2019	Ishq Ne	Director / Choreographer
2020	Tera Kya Hota	Director
2020	Bhula Dunga	Director
2022	Nasch Babe	Director

== See also ==
- List of choreographers
- List of Indian actors
- List of people from Mumbai
