= Rimi Nique =

Thai-Indian singer, composer, performer

Remee
- Born: Thailand
- Occupations: Singer songwriter, Performing artist
- Website: www.remeemusic.com

Remee (previously Rimi Nique) is a Thai-Indian singer, composer, performer known for her appearance on the show The Voice Thailand Season 2 (2013), performing 'Lady Marmalade", India's Raw Star (2014), and The Stage (2015). She made her debut as a lyricist and playback singer in the Bollywood music industry with the song "Naach Meri Jaan" that was featured in the movie Any Body Can Dance 2. She is versatile, being able to sing in six different languages: Hindi, English, Punjabi, Thai, and Spanish.

Remee won ’Best Pop Artist" Radio City Freedom Awards 4 (2016), with Sanket Sane, on her track ‘On a High Zindagi’

Remee wrote and sang 'Shilong Harvest Song' in the Sony album "Silence Is a Bliss" with Indian flautist Naveen Kumar, and drummer Sivamani in 2015. The same year she also sang "Sunny Sunny The Workout Song" for Sunny Leone's workout video with the singer Darshan Raval.

Remee worked as a lyricist and singer is the song "Saasain huin dhuan dhuan" featured in the Race 3 movie franchise (2018)

Remee joins hands with DJ Bravo for a new single called 'The Chamiya Song'(2019) as a lyricist and singer/composer. The song also features Shakti Mohan and is choreographed by Rahul Shetty. On sharing her working experience with Bravo, “Bravo is always looking out for me, making me feel respected and safe and I couldn’t have asked for a better friend to collaborate with.”

The Times of India describes her as a modern performer known for a dance move called the "Scooter," which has been performed by other artists like Honey Singh. StarPlus notes that she is a singer who performs in multiple languages.

Remee has also performed and directed concerts representing World Visions UK, the US Embassy and so much more. Her track record ranges from being in broadway musicals, to voiceovers and singing for major commercials, choirs, dancing, composing, etc.

Remee recently performed a party set in Times Square NY for Diwali 2022 for over 20,000 people amongst other headliners like Arjun, and Jay Sean. She represented India at the Hollywood Carnival in LA in 2023; opening act for renowned soca artist Machel Montana.

== Personal life ==
Born and raised in Thailand, to Gurvinder Singh Doowa and Dalvinder Kaur Doowa, she is the eldest daughter with two younger siblings. Remee is based in Mumbai and Bangkok, while her family resides in Thailand. She completed her schooling in 2008 from Ruamrudee International School (RIS), Bangkok, where she was part of the Jeremiah Singers choir. She majored in economics and environmental studies with a music minor at Whitman College in Washington State, where she was part of the A-Capella group ‘Schwa’. She started the band "Dabbles in Bloom" with Adriel Borshansky, Robby Seager, and Jonas Myers. Their first album, "Found It", was released in July 2010, followed by a tour in the Pacific North West.

== Discography ==
Year	Title	Film/album	Co-singers	Label
2015	Shillong Harvest	Silence is bliss	Naveen Kumar	Sony Music India
2016	Naach Meri Jaan	ABCD 2	Benny Dayal; Shalmali Kholgade; Siddharth Basrur	Zee Music Company
2016	On A High Zindagi	–	Sanket Sane	Times Music
2018	Saansain Hui Dhuaan Dhuaan	Race 3	Gurinder Seagal; Payal Dev	Tips Music
2019	The Chamiya Song	–	DJ Bravo; Gaurav Dagaonkar	SongFest India
