= Bir Radha Sherpa =

Indian dancer

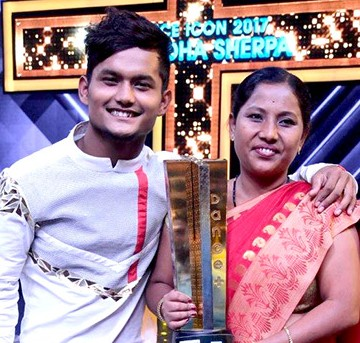
- Bir Radha Sherpa with his mother.
- Born: 15 August 1999 (age 26); Silchar, Assam, India
- Other names: Chirag, BRS
- Education: Gurucharan College, Silchar
- Occupation: Dancer
- Style: B-boying and Contemporary
- Height: 5.7 ft 0 in (174 cm)

Bir Radha Sherpa is an Indian dancer, who is renowned for winning- Dance Plus (season 3) and Dance Champions.

== Early life ==
Bir was born on 15 August 1999, in Silchar, Assam. Born in a poor family, Bir always showed a passion for dancing as a child, and performed in many live events in his areas prior to contesting in any notable competition.

== Career ==
=== Dance Plus ===
Bir auditioned for Dance Plus (season 3) and was selected into Team Punit- headed by Punit Pathak. He dominated the entire season to enter the final, and eventually went on to win it successfully. This was also the first win for a dancer in Team Punit.

=== Dance Champions ===
Bir was chosen to represent Dance Plus in Dance Champions, that featured champion dancers who won or were runners-up in different shows. Entering as a favorite, Bir went on the win the competition in the final.

=== Dance India Dance Li'l Masters ===
Mentor for one of team in season 4. Tamman Gamnu from Bir ke Baahubali was the second runner-up of that season.
