= Lal Pahare'r Katha =

- Poster of Lal Pahare'r Katha
- Directed by: Remo D'Souza
- Produced by: Bimal Oberoi; Lizelle D'Souza
- Starring: Mithun Chakraborty; Rishi; Shankar Chakravarty; Shankar Debnath; Rimjhim; Bidipta Chakravarty; Moumita Gupta; Kayyum; Diya; Piyali; Kamal Chakravarty
- Cinematography: Shoumik Halder
- Music by: Modhu Mukherjee
- Release date: 10 December 2007 (Dubai International Film Festival)
- Running time: 145 minutes
- Country: India
- Language: Bengali

Lal Pahare'r Katha (transl. A story of the red hills), is a 2007 Indian Bengali-language film directed by Remo D'Souza, starring Mithun Chakraborty, Rishi, Shankar Chakravarty, Diya and Piyali. After choreographing songs in more than 100 films in the previous eight years, Remo turned director with this Bengali film, which has been screened at the Dubai International Film Festival. Remo's wife Lizelle D'Souza has produced the film.

== Cast ==
- Mithun Chakraborty
- Rishi
- Shankar Chakraborty
- Shankar Debnath
- Rimjhim
- Bidipta Chakraborty
- Moumita Gupta
- Kayyum
- Diya
- Piyali
- Shankhanil
- Kamal Chakravarty

== Release ==
Lal Pahare'r Katha was released in 2007, but not in India. Remo said "I made my first Bengali film based on Chhau dance - a traditional Indian tribal art form and won lot of appreciation for it in countries like US, Germany etc, but in India, nobody released that film because no one wants to watch Indian classical forms."
