= Dance Plus season 2 =

2nd season

Dance Plus
- Season 2
- Hosted by: Raghav Juyal
- Judges: Remo D'Souza
- Coaches: Dharmesh Yelande; Shakti Mohan; Punit Pathak
- No. of contestants: 16
- Winner: Tanay Malhara
- Winning mentor: Dharmesh Yelande
- Runner-up: Wild Ripperz
- Finals venue: Mumbai

Release
- Original network: Star Plus
- Original release: 2 July – 25 September 2016

Season chronology
- ← Previous; Season 1 Next → Season 3

Season 2 of Dance Plus tagline Get Set Go premiered on 2 July 2016 on Star Plus. It was created and produced by Varun Trikha Productions, Urban Brew Studios and Frames Production and aired for 25 episodes. This time there were two talents from Nepal who progressed to the Grand Finale (Wild Ripperz Crew and Sushant Khatri). Mokshda Jailkhani was the first contestant to get the double plus. Wild Ripperz set the record by gaining Double Plus for 8 consecutive times. Auditions were conducted across several cities of India from 3 May 2016 to 26 May 2016. This show was hosted by Raghav Juyal.

== Winner ==
- Tanay Malhara of team Dharmesh is India's new dance icon.
- Wild Ripperz Crew of team Dharmesh are the first runners-up.
- Piyush Bhagat of team Shakti is the second runner-up.
- Sushant Khatri of team Shakti is the third runner-up.

== Super judge ==
Remo D'Souza was the super judge for this season also. He is a well-known and reputed choreographer and film director. He has directed movies like F.A.L.T.U., Any Body Can Dance (ABCD 1 and ABCD 2), A Flying Jatt, and Race 3. He was also a judge on Jhalak Dikhla Ja and Dance India Dance (Season 1, Season 2, and Season 3). He has judged many dance shows previously.

== Mentors ==
There are three mentors on the show

- Dharmesh Yelande
- Shakti Mohan
- Punit Pathak

All the three Mentors have their own team consisting of contestants selected in auditions. Only one winner is chosen from all the teams at the end of the competition.

== Teams ==
Dharmesh Yelande's Team	DYT	←Acronym↓
Yo Highness	Group	YH
Tanay Malhara	Solo	TM
Wild Ripperz Crew (Nepali Crew)	Group	WRC
Mokshada Jail Khaani	Solo	BF
Shakti Mohan's Team	SMT	←Acronym↓
Piyush Bhagat	Solo	PB
Sushant Khatri (Nepal)	Solo	SK
B.A.N.D.I.T.S. Crew	Group	BC
X1X crew	Group	X1X
Punit Pathak's Team	PPT	←Acronym↓
Shazia Samji	Solo	SS
Urban Singh Crew	Group	USC
F.A.M.O.U.S Crew	Group	FC
Mingma Lepcha	Solo	ML

== Top 8 progress ==
Date	Team	Contestant
17 July 2016	Team Shakti	Piyush Bhagat
24 July 2016	Team Punit	Mingma Lepcha
31 July 2016	Team Shakti	Sushant Khatri (Nepal)
7 August 2016	Team Punit	Urban Singh Crew
14 August 2016	Team Shakti	B.A.N.D.I.T.S. Crew
21 August 2016	Team Dharmesh	Wild Ripperz Crew (Nepal)
21 August 2016	Team Dharmesh	Tanay Malhara
21 August 2016	Team Punit	Elee Angels

== Top 4 ==
- Piyush Bhagat - 11 September 2016
- Wild Ripperz Crew from Nepal - 18 September 2016
- Sushant Khatri - 18 September 2016
- Tanay Malhara

== Final results ==
- 1st Tanay Malhara From Jalgaon.
- 2nd Wild Ripperz Crew From Nepal.
- 3rd Piyush Bhagat from Jammu
- 4th Sushant Khatri from Nepal.

== Celebrity guests ==
Actor	Episode Date	Episode No.	Notes
Varun Dhawan & Jacqueline Fernandez	23 July 2016	7 & 8	To promote their film Dishoom
Tiger Shroff & Nathan Jones	31 July 2016	9 & 10	To promote their film A Flying Jatt
Lizelle D'Souza	7 August 2016	12	
Hrithik Roshan & Pooja Hegde	13 August 2016	13 & 14	To promote their film Mohenjo Daro
Sonakshi Sinha	27 August 2016	17 & 18	To promote her film Akira
Bosco-Caesar	3 September 2016	19	To support Piyush Bhagat
Prabhu Deva & Sonu Sood	10 September 2016	21 & 22	To promote their film Tutak Tutak Tutiya
Riteish Deshmukh & Nargis Fakhri	18 September 2016	24	To promote their film Banjo
Sushant Singh Rajput	24 September 2016	25	To promote his film M.S. Dhoni: The Untold Story
Ranbir Kapoor	25 September 2016	26	To promote his film Ae Dil Hai Mushkil
Sakshi Malik	25 September 2016	26	
