= Raghav Juyal =

Indian actor and dancer (born 1991)

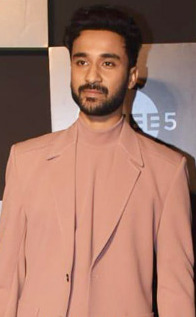
- Juyal in 2023
- Born: 10 July 1991 (age 35); Dehradun, Uttarakhand, India
- Other name: Crockroaxz
- Education: Bachelor of Commerce
- Alma mater: DAV College
- Occupations: Actor; dancer; choreographer; television presenter
- Years active: 2011–present

Raghav Juyal (born 10 July 1991) is an Indian actor, dancer, choreographer, and television presenter. He is known as the "King of Slow Motion" for his surreal dance moves in slow motion style and for his reinvention of the Slow Motion Walk in India. He rose to fame after being a contestant and finalist in Zee TV's dance reality show Dance India Dance 3 and a skipper for the team Raghav Ke Rockstars in Dance India Dance Li'l Masters 2 and Dance Ke Superkids where his team was declared the winner under his captainship. Juyal was a contestant on Fear Factor: Khatron Ke Khiladi 7 (2016). In 2024, he garnered recognition with the action thriller Kill (2024) and the Netflix series The Ba***ds of Bollywood (2025).

== Early life ==
Raghav Juyal was born to Deepak Juyal, an advocate, and Alka Bakshi Juyal, his mother is a Punjabi. He was born and brought up in Dehradun, Uttarakhand. Born in a Garhwali Brahmin family he belongs to his ancestral village Khetu in Uttarakhand.

Juyal never had any formal training in dance but picked it up from watching performances from the internet and television. He started winning laurels as a dancer right from his days in Doon International School. Later, he joined DAV (PG) College to pursue his B.Com.

== Career ==
=== Dancing ===
Juyal became known when his audition video went viral on YouTube. He was a contestant on the first season of Dance India Dance, which aired on Zee TV. He was not professionally trained by anyone prior to coming on the show. Juyal showcased a new dance style but wasn't selected in the Top 18 by the Grand Master in Mega Audition. Later, on public demand,the show made an exception in the format by reintroducing him on the show as Grand Master Mithun Chakraborty's "trump card" in the wild-card round, through which he entered the competition again.

Thereafter, Juyal created different dance-forms and reached the finale. He was the most popular contestant of the season having garnered the most No. 1 positions in weekly voting. At the grand finale, he was voted with 3,481,685 votes in the 2nd runner up position.

After DID, Raghav became the skipper of team Raghav Ke Rockstars in the second season of DID Li'l Masters where he choreographed for Saumya Rai and Rohan Parkale. He was the only skipper to lead both of his students to the Grand finale, in which Rohan and Saumya attained 2nd and 3rd runner up positions respectively.

Raghav then choreographed for Zee TV's show Dance Ke Superkids as the Captain of the second season's DID Li'l Masters team Yahoo and competed against the first season's DID Li'l Masters team Wakao – with Dharmesh Yelande as the Captain. In the Grand Finale, his team was declared the winner.

=== Acting ===
In 2014, Juyal debuted as an actor by playing a pivotal role in the comedy film Sonali Cable, co-starring Rhea Chakraborty and Ali Fazal, produced by Ramesh Sippy Entertainment which was released on 17 October 2014. One reviewer singled out Raghav's vivacious performance and praised his screen presence, while another says he "steals every scene he's in" and another says he is "better than the leads". The next year he starred in the dance film, ABCD 2, which was released on 19 June 2015, directed by Remo D'Souza co-starring Varun Dhawan and Shraddha Kapoor. Later, he also hosted the first season of dance reality show Dance Plus which aired on Star Plus. In the same year, he co-hosted Prem Ki Diwali along with Karishma Tanna which was broadcast on Life Ok.

In 2016, he was seen in Khatron Ke Khiladi season 7 as a contestant which aired on Colors TV. Later, he hosted the second season of Dance Plus. In the same year, he also co-hosted and appeared on Star Parivaar Awards and Colors Golden Petal Awards. Later he hosted and performed on the show, Timeless Aisha which was aired on Zee Classic. The following year he co-hosted the singing reality show, Rising Star along with Meiyang Chang which aired on Colors TV. In mid 2017, he has hosted the third season of Dance Plus. In the same year, he began co-hosting the dance reality show, Dance Champions, with Ridhima Pandit.

In 2018, he co-hosted the second season of the singing reality show, Dil Hai Hindustani along with Mukti Mohan. He then starred in the romantic comedy film, Nawabzaade along with Dharmesh Yelande, Punit Pathak and Isha Rikhi directed by Jayesh Pradhan which was released on 27 July 2018. Later in the year, he co-hosted the fourth season of Dance Plus along with Sugandha Mishra. In 2019, he hosted the fifth season of Dance Plus.

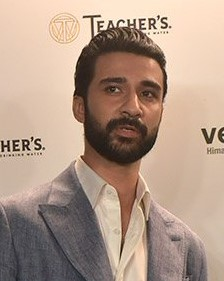
Juyal at a GQ event in 2026.

In 2020, he featured in dance film Street Dancer 3D with Varun Dhawan, Shraddha Kapoor, Prabhu Deva, and Nora Fatehi. Then he appeared in the second season of the Zee5 dark crime thriller series Abhay directed by Ken Ghosh, which was released on 14 August 2020, playing the negative dark character for the first time. He played the lead role in the satirical comedy film Bahut Hua Samman produced by Yoodlee Films and directed by Ashish R. Shukla, shared screen space with Sanjay Misra. The movie was released on 2 October 2020 on Disney+ Hotstar due to COVID-19 pandemic and received positive reviews from the audience and critics. Raghav next starred opposite Ankita Sharma in a romantic movie titled Wedlock directed by Sachin Karande. The shoot was completed in various locations of Mumbai in 25 days shoot schedule. The film was set to release in August 2021, but has been shelved.

On 15 February 2021, Farhan Akhtar dropped the first teaser of his new film, and announced Yudhra to be produced by his company, Excel Entertainment. Raghav along with Siddhant Chaturvedi and Malavika Mohanan. The film was directed by Ravi Udyawar. Yudhra's story and screenplay have been penned jointly by Farhan Akhtar and Shridhar Raghavan. The film released in 2024.

In 2024, Juyal attained wider recognition as an actor in the film Kill, in which he essayed the role of the antagonist, while debutante Lakshya starred as the protagonist. In 2025, Juyal was felicitated with International Indian Film Academy Awards (IIFA) for Best Performance in a Negative Role at 25th IIFA Awards, for his performance in the film. Juyal reunited with Lakshya in the web-series The Ba***ds of Bollywood, which brought him further recognition.

He is now set to star in the film Bhai Tera Star Hai, which is his first theatrical lead role as an actor, opposite influencer and actor Niharika NM. He will also be appearing in the Shah Rukh Khan-starrer King.

== Artistry ==
His signature step was slow motion walk. Choreographers like Geeta Kapoor and Remo D'Souza and Terrence Lewis have stated that they had never seen anyone emulate the slow motion walk in India, as realistically, before Raghav. Raghav is a trained actor, mentored by the actor and acting coach Saurabh Sachdeva.

== Filmography ==
=== As Film Actor ===
Key
†	Denotes films that have not yet been released

Year	Title	Role	Notes	Ref.
2014	Sonali Cable	Sada		
2015	ABCD 2	Raghav / "Crocxz"		
2018	Nawabzaade	Karan		
2020	Street Dancer 3D	Poddy		
2020	Bahut Hua Samman	Bony		
2023	Kisi Ka Bhai Kisi Ki Jaan	Ishq		
2024	Kill	Fani Bhushan		
2024	Yudhra	Shafiq Firoze		
2025	Nishaanchi 2	Dancer	Cameo	
2026	Bhai Tera Star Hai	Ajay		
2026	The Paradise	Vikram Maalik	Telugu film	
2026	Ramayana: Part 1	Meghanada	Cameo appearance	
2026	King †	TBA		
TBA	Hasal †	TBA		
TBA	Any Body Can Dream †	TBA		
2028	Ramayana: Part 2 †	Meghanada		

=== Television ===
Year	Title	Role	Notes
2011	Chak Dhoom Dhoom 2	Contestant	
2011	Dance India Dance 3	Contestant	2nd runner-up
2012	Dance Ke Superkids	Captain	Winner
2012	Dance India Dance Li'l Masters 2	Captain	
2013	Dance India Dance 4	Himself	Guest
2013	Dance India Dance Super Moms	Captain	
2014	Dance India Dance Li'l Masters 3	Captain	
2015	Dance Plus	Host	
2015	Nach Baliye 7	Himself	Guest
2015	Dance India Dance Super Moms 2	Himself	Guest
2016	Fear Factor: Khatron Ke Khiladi 7	Contestant	6th place
2016	Dance Plus 2	Host	
2017	Super Dancer	Himself	Guest
2017	Entertainment Ki Raat	Himself	Guest
2017	Dance Champions	Host	
2017	Dance Plus 3	Host	
2017	Rising Star	Host	
2018	Dance Plus 4	Host	
2018	Dil Hai Hindustani 2	Host	
2019	Dance Plus 5	Host	
2019	Khatra Khatra Khatra	Himself	Guest
2019	Bigg Boss 13	Himself	Guest
2020	India's Best Dancer	Himself	Guest
2021	Bigg Boss 14	Himself	Guest
2021	Dance Deewane 3	Host	
2021	Super Dancer 4	Himself	Guest
2021	Dance Plus 6	Host	
2025	India's Best Dancer	Himself	Guest
2025	Hip Hop India Season 2	Himself	Guest

=== Music videos ===
List of Raghav Juyal music video credits
Year	Title	Singer(s)	Ref.
2020	Hum Tum	Sukriti Kakar, Prakriti Kakar	

=== Web series ===
List of Raghav Juyal web series credits
Year	Title	Role	Ref.
2020	Abhay 2	Samar	
2024	Gyaarah Gyaarah	Inspector Yug Arya	
2025	The Ba***ds of Bollywood	Parvaiz	
2026	India's Got Latent	Himself	
