= Kings United =

Dance group from India

Kings United India
- Years active: 2009–present
- Notable work: World of Dance; World Hip Hop Dance Championship
- Style: Hip-hop; voguing; popping; dancehall; lyrical hip hop
- Website: www.kingsunitedindia.com

The Kings is an Indian hip-hop dance group from Vasai, a city in Maharashtra. They won NBC'S World of Dance and came third at World Hip Hop Dance Championship. Emmy awards nominee Suresh Mukund, is the choreographer and director of the group.

== Kings United ==
In 2015, they became the first Indian group to win a medal at the World Hip Hop Dance Championship held in San Diego, California. They gained worldwide fame after they won Season 3 of NBC's World of Dance in 2019 in Los Angeles, California.

== History ==
In 2009, Suresh Mukund and Vernon Monterio formed a hip hop dance group by the name of 'Fictitious Dance Group' which participated in various Indian dance shows and competitions.

In 2009, the group won the popular dance show Boogie Woogie. The group went on to win Entertainment Ke liye Kuch Bhi Karega in 2010 and later the same year they were ranked third in Season 2 of India's Got Talent.

Choosing to re-enter the competition the following year, the group changed its name to the SNV Group named after members Suresh Mukund and Vernon Monteiro and this time won Season 3 of India's Got Talent in 2011.

In 2012, the SNV Group travelled to Las Vegas and entered the World Hip Hop Dance Championship where they made it to the finals and finished in 8th place, a first for an Indian group. Their hardships in funding their trip and their remarkable achievement in the competition were documented in the 2015 Bollywood film ABCD 2 which was directed by choreographer Remo D'Souza and starred prominent actors like Varun Dhawan, Prabhu Deva and Shraddha Kapoor in lead roles. Suresh is played by Varun Dhawan and Vernon is played by Sushant Pujari.

After the release of the film, Mukund and Vernon parted ways due to creative differences and the group split with Vernon starting his own dance crew called "V Company" who subsequently won Season-1 of Dance Plus.

Mukund then founded "Kings United India" with some of his old team members and a few new additions.

=== 2015: World Hip Hop Dance Championship ===
In 2015, Mukund made a last minute decision to put together a dance crew to re-enter the World Hip Hop Dance Championship in San Diego. Actor Varun Dhawan arranged for Pond's to partially fund the group and pitched in with his own money to help out. Kings United came in third and won the Bronze medal.

=== 2016: Dance Academy ===
On January 3, 2016, they opened their own dance academy, "Kings United: Kingdom Of Art" in Vasai, Mumbai. The academy was inaugurated by choreographer Remo D'Souza and actor Varun Dhawan.

In 2017, Kings United competed in the Indian dance reality show Dance Champions aired on Star Plus.

=== 2019: World of Dance and upcoming projects ===
On May 6, 2019, Kings United won the American dance reality show World of Dance Season 3 with a perfect score of 100 in the grand finale, where they danced Vishal Dadlani's Malhari from the 2015 Indian Historical Musical Bajirao Mastani, thus winning a prize money of US$1 million. In a 2019 interview with a YouTube channel, Mukund said that 80% of the winnings would be shared among the team members. Mukund has been nominated for an Emmy Award in the Outstanding Choreography for Variety or Reality Program category for the Kings' performances.

The crew is planning a world tour and conducting international dance workshops. After their win, Mukund also mentioned that the Kings United would no longer participate in competitions. There have been reports of a possible show with Jennifer Lopez.

Mukund and his team will be judging India's first online dance competition by imd1. The competition is called Dance Is Life - DIL2019.

== Achievements and appearances ==
Year	Competitions	Awards
2009	Boogie Woogie (Sony)	Winners
2010	Entertainment Ke Liye Kuch Bhi Karega	Winners
2010	India's Got Talent 2	Contestants
2011	India's Got Talent 3	Winner vs SNV
2012	World Hip Hop Dance Championship	Top 8
2015	World Hip Hop Dance Championship	Bronze Medal
2015	ABCD: Any Body Can Dance 2	Biopic on Kings
2017	Dance Champions	Ultimate 10
2019	World Of Dance 3	Winners
2019	Emmy awards	(Suresh Mukund) Nominated
2019	Dance Is Life	Online Judge
2019	Dance Plus 5	(Suresh) Captain and Guest
2019	Valiyaperunnal	Choreography
2021	World Choreography Awards	(Suresh Mukund) Wins
2021	Dance Deewane (Season 3)	Guests and special performance Independence Day Special
