= Thank You Maa =

Television series

- Created by: Ekta Kapoor; Shobha Kapoor
- Country of origin: India
- Original language: Hindi
- No. of seasons: 01

Production
- Producers: Ekta Kapoor; Shobha Kapoor
- Production locations: Mumbai, Maharashtra, India
- Camera setup: Multi-camera
- Production company: Balaji Telefilms

Original release
- Network: Star Plus
- Release: 10 May 2015

Thank You Maa was an Indian television special episode which aired on Star Plus on 10 May 2015 at 6 PM IST, Mother's Day. The special episode was produced by Balaji Telefilms. The episode starred popular Bollywood actor, Ranveer Singh and many other Bollywood actors and actresses.

Thank You Maa was dedicated to all the mothers for all their love, and also featured performances by Bollywood celebrities like Shakti Mohan, Sanjeeda Sheikh, Gurmeet Choudhary, Aditya Narayan, Aditi Sharma, Salman Yusuff Khan among others.

== Cast ==
- Karan Singh Grover
- Shakti Mohan
- Sanjeeda Sheikh
- Gurmeet Choudhary
- Aditya Narayan
- Aditi Sharma
- Salman Yusuff Khan
