= Dharmesh Yelande =

Indian dancer and choreographer (born 1983)

- Born: 31 October 1983 (age 42); Vadodara, Gujarat, India
- Other name: D-sir
- Occupations: Dancer; choreographer; television personality
- Years active: 2007–present

Dharmesh Yelande (born 31 October 1983) also known as D-sir, is an Indian dancer, choreographer, and television personality.

== Career ==
Yelande participated in Dance India Dance (2009–2010), Dance India Dance Li'l Masters (2010) and Dance Ke Superstars (2011) that aired on Zee TV. He was hired by Farah Khan to choreograph the Hindi movie Tees Maar Khan (2010).

In 2013, Yelande debuted as an actor by playing a lead role in the 3D dance-based Hindi ABCD: Any Body Can Dance co-starring Salman Yusuff Khan and Prabhu Deva. In 2015, he acted in Disney's, ABCD 2 with Varun Dhawan and Shraddha Kapoor. He has a dance academy in Vadodara known as the D'virus Dance Academy.

In 2016, Yelande worked in the film Banjo opposite Riteish Deshmukh and Nargis Fakhri. He was a mentor for the dance reality show Dance Plus (2015–2019) for five consecutive seasons.

In 2020, Yelande appeared in dance film Street Dancer 3D with Varun Dhawan, Shraddha Kapoor, Nora Fatehi and Raghav Juyal. Later he participated in Fear Factor: Khatron Ke Khiladi 10 (2020) and emerged as the second runner-up.

In 2021, Yelande was a judge in Dance Deewane season 3.

== Filmography ==
=== Films ===
Year	Movie	Role	Notes
2013	ABCD : AnyBody Can Dance	Danish "D" Qureshi	
2013	Angarki	Special lead dancer	Marathi movie
2015	ABCD 2	Dharmesh a.k.a. "D"	
2015	Biker's adda	Special Lead Dancer	Marathi movie
2016	Banjo	Grease	
2018	Nawabzaade	Salim	
2020	Street Dancer 3D	D	
2020	Safalta 0 km	Saurya Mehta	With Manisha Thakkar
2025	Sanduk		With kumud mishra and sharib hashmi

=== Television ===
Year	Show	Channel	Notes
2007	Krazzy Kiya Re	DD National	Runner-up
2008	Boogie Woogie	Sony Entertainment Television	Winner.
2009	Dance India Dance (season 2)	Zee TV	Runner-up
2010	Dance India Dance Li'l Masters	Zee TV	Jeetumoni
2010	Comedy Ka Daily Soap	Sony Entertainment Television	Guest performance.
2010	Zee Rishtey Awards	Zee TV	Guest performance
2010	Dance India Dance Doubles	Zee TV	Assisted mentor Geeta Kapoor and choreographed some of the gems from the season.
2011	Dance Ke Superstars	Zee TV	Winner of the show.
2011	Dhamal Night	Zee Cinema	Guest performance.
2011	Just Dance	Star Plus	He choreographed the final performance of Hrithik Roshan and some other performances in the show.
2012	Dance Ke Superkids	Zee TV	Captain of Wakao (Dance India Dance Li'l Masters season 1).
2013	Dance India Dance (season 4)	ZEE TV	supporting a contestant
2013	MAD – Maharashtracha Assal Dancer	Colors Marathi	One of the 3 judges of the show
2015	Dance Plus (season 1)	Star Plus	Winning Captain
2016	Dance Plus (season 2)	Star Plus	Winning Captain
2016	Chala Hawa Yeu Dya	Zee Marathi	Guest
2017	Dance Plus (season 3)	Star Plus	Captain
2018	Dance Plus (season 4)	Star Plus	Captain
2019	Dance Plus (season 5)	Star Plus	Winning Captain
2019	Khatra Khatra Khatra	Colors TV	Guest
2020	Fear Factor: Khatron Ke Khiladi 10	Colors TV	Second Runner Up
2020	India's Best Dancer	Sony Entertainment Television	Guest
2020	The Kapil Sharma Show	Sony Entertainment Television	Guest
2020	Maharashtra's Best Dancer	Sony Marathi	Judge
2021	Bigg Boss 14	Colors TV	Guest
2021	Dance Deewane (season 3)	Colors TV	Judge

=== As a choreographer ===
Year	Title	Notes
2010	Tees Maar Khan	He choreographed the title song for Akshay Kumar.
