= Street Dancer 3D =

2020 Indian film by Remo D'Souza

- Theatrical release poster
- Directed by: Remo D'Souza
- Written by: Screenplay: Tushar Hiranandani; Jagdeep Sidhu; Dialogues: Farhad Samji; Jagdeep Sidhu
- Story by: Remo D'Souza
- Produced by: Bhushan Kumar; Divya Khosla Kumar; Krishan Kumar; Lizelle D'Souza
- Starring: Varun Dhawan; Shraddha Kapoor; Prabhu Deva; Nora Fatehi
- Cinematography: Vijay Kumar Arora
- Edited by: Manan Ajay Sagar
- Music by: Songs and Score: Sachin–Jigar; Additional Songs: Tanishk Bagchi; Badshah; Guru Randhawa; Gurinder Seagal; Harsh Upadhyay
- Production companies: T-Series; Remo D'Souza Entertainment
- Distributed by: AA Films
- Release date: 24 January 2020
- Running time: 146 minutes
- Country: India
- Language: Hindi
- Budget: ₹70 crore
- Box office: est. ₹97 crore

Street Dancer 3D is a 2020 Indian Hindi-language dance film directed by Remo D'Souza and produced by Bhushan Kumar, Divya Khosla Kumar, Krishan Kumar and Lizelle D'Souza under the banners of T-Series and R.D. Entertainment. The film stars Varun Dhawan, Shraddha Kapoor and Prabhu Deva along with Nora Fatehi. The music was composed by Sachin–Jigar, Tanishk Bagchi, Badshah, Guru Randhawa, Gurinder Seagal and Harsh Upadhyay, and released under the banner of T-Series.

Based in London, Street Dancer 3D explores the conflict between an Indian dance team and a rival Pakistani dance team, whose members try to prove themselves as better until they take part in Ground Zero, one of the biggest dance competitions, for different wills; under various circumstances and harsh memories, they come together to win the competition.

Originally planned as a sequel to Disney's ABCD 2 (2015), the film was taken off the title due to Disney's exit from Indian film production, and was instead renamed to its current title after Bhushan Kumar took over as producer. Filming commenced in February 2019 in Punjab, later moved to London and was wrapped up in July 2019. The film was theatrically released in India on 24 January 2020.

== Plot ==
In 2017, Sahej Singh Narula becomes the leader of Street Dancer, a London-based Indian-origin hip-hop group, after his brother Inder, the former leader, injures his knee in the finals of a dance competition called Ground Zero.

Two years, in 2019, after Inder’s injury, Sahej purchases a dance studio, the source of funding for which is hidden. Street Dancer is challenged by the Rule Breakers, a rival Pakistani hip-hop group led by Inayat Naazi. Inayat hides her hip-hop lifestyle from her conservative Muslim family. Street Dancer loses to the Rule Breakers because of their overused style. The rival teams watch an India vs Pakistan cricket match at a restaurant owned by Ram Prasad (Prabhu Deva). Rising tensions result in a food fight; in order to not be arrested by the cops, Sahej and Inayat feign a relationship in the presence of local cop Michael Donald, who is himself of partial Indian and Pakistani origin. Sahej asks his girlfriend Mia to coach Street Dancer, as she is a dancer for the Royals, a British dance team that is reigning champion of the Ground Zero competition, led by Marc. Street Dancer and the Rule Breakers watch the India vs Pakistan final match at Ram’s restaurant. Tensions escalate into a dance battle, which the improved Street Dancer wins.

After the dance battle, Inayat discovers that Ram feeds leftover food from his restaurant to homeless illegal immigrants. Ram shows Inayat how the homeless of different backgrounds fight together to survive while the privileged dance teams fight against each other over nationality, wasting food in the process. It is revealed that while attending a cousin’s wedding in India, Sahej was pressured to illegally bring a group of dhol players to England, the tipping point being the dhol players’ shady agent Chhabra paying Sahej 4 million rupees, which Sahej used to buy Street Dancer’s studio. Inayat wants the Rule Breakers to win Ground Zero for the 100,000 pound grand prize to pay for the homeless immigrants to get back to their home countries. Sahej wants to win Ground Zero for Inder. Ram states that if Street Dancer and the Rule Breakers were to team up, they would be unstoppable, but the teams refuse. After a dance battle at a club, Sahej and three members of Street Dancer, Sushi, D and Poddy are recruited into the Royals. At Ram’s restaurant, an increasingly arrogant Sahej boasts to the Rule Breakers that he is unbeatable as a Royal. To this, Ram reveals that he is a master of dance and is coaching the Rule Breakers.

After the first round of Ground Zero, Sahej runs into Amrinder, one of the dhol players he helped bring to England. Amrinder reveals his group was conned by Chhabra and are now struggling as homeless illegal immigrants, unable to return to India. He begs Sahej for help, but Sahej denies responsibility and ditches him. Poddy is revealed to be in a secret relationship with Alisha, a member of the Rule Breakers; when he tries to convince Sahej of the nobility of Inayat's plans to win Ground Zero, he is instead rebuffed and, in anger, leaves the Royals. After the Royals’ semi final battle, the team encounters the homeless dhol players on the street and disrespects them. Sahej, who cannot muster the courage to stop Marc from insulting Amrinder, finally accepts the consequences of his actions and sees how Inayat’s efforts can help the dhol players he wronged. When the Rule Breakers come close to elimination, Sahej succumbs to his guilt and rebels against the Royals. Street Dancer joins the Rule Breakers to advance to the finals against the Royals. Inayat’s conservative family discovers that she is a dancer and forbids her from the competition. However, Sahej convinces them that although Inayat’s hip-hop lifestyle is incompatible with her religious customs, the good she brings to the world through her dancing is godserving and morally righteous. Her father allows her to dance in the finals, and the two teams compete under the name Street Dancer. During Street Dancer's performance, a member of the Royals disconnects their music. Street Dancer must almost forfeit to the Royals, but Amrinder and the other dhol players perform live music. However, Marc finds out that one of his team members took out the music and he asks his teammate to put the music back. Street Dancer wins the competition, earning the respect of the Royals. Using the prize money, they send homeless illegal immigrants, including the dhol players, back home, while Sahej and Inayat begin a relationship.

== Cast ==
- Prabhu Deva as Ram Prasad a.k.a. Anna, a restaurant manager who secretly is a skilled dancer and also feeds the homeless.
- Varun Dhawan as Sahej Singh Narula, an aspiring dancer who follows his brother's footsteps. He is the leader of the Street Dancer group, but after their separation, temporarily becomes a member of the Royals. He joins Rule Breakers afterwards and names the whole team, Street Dancer
- Shraddha Kapoor as Inayat Naazi, a Pakistani dancer who dances in secret to avoid her conservative family finding out. She and her cousin Zain are leaders of the Rule Breakers.
- Raghav Juyal as Poddy, Sahej's closest friend who joins the Rule Breakers.
- Nora Fatehi as Mia, Sahej's girlfriend and a member of the Royals
- Punit Pathak as Inder Singh Narula, Sahej's brother who was the leader of the Street Dancer group, but injured his knee during a Ground Zero battle 2 years prior.
- Salman Yusuff Khan as Zain Naazi, Inayat's cousin who is also involved with the Rule Breakers.
- Aparshakti Khurana as Amrinder Singh, a talented drummer from India who lives a miserable life as a homeless illegal immigrant in London.
- Dharmesh Yelande as D, Sahej's close friend. After a few years of the initial dysfunction of the Street Dancer group upon Inder's injury, he had taken up a job in an antique store.
- Sushant Pujari as Sushi, Sahej's close friend
- Sonam Bajwa as Pammi Kaur Chaddha
- Murli Sharma as UK Cop Michael Donald, a Pakistani-Indian cop who made sure that Street Dancer and Rule Breakers didn't fight at Anna's restaurant.
- Upasana Singh as Jasleen Kaur Chaddha, Pammi's mother
- Zarina Wahab as Ranjot Singh, Amrinder's mother
- Umair Asanti Khalil as Faris Inayat
- Manoj Pahwa as Chhabra
- Pavan Rao as Fahad
- Vartika Jha as Samaira
- Sushant Khatri as Chotu, a waiter at Anna's restaurant who is secretly a dancer, and Anna's assistant with feeding the homeless. He also becomes the second-in-command of the Rule Breakers when Anna takes over.
- Keshav KV Tutter as KV
- Pravin Bhosle as Pravin
- Shyraa Roy as Roxen
- Shashank Dogra as Aamir
- Nivedita Sharma as Nivi
- Bhusan as Tofique Khan
- Prashant Shinde as Sam
- Bhupendra Singh as Omar
- Pravin Shinde as Naussef
- Sheetal Perry as Perry
- Vinay Khandelwal as Faiz
- Chandani Shrivastava as Chandani
- Francis Roughly as Marc, the leader of the Royals and a ruthless, selfish man.
- Caroline Wilde as Alisha
- Adriano Gal as Alex
- Jai Hickling as Jai
- Jesus Soria Antolin as Bboy
- Raj Gohil as Zaheer Naazi, Inayat's elder brother, a man who is also conservative, like his younger brother, but allows Inayat to dance at the Ground Zero finals.

== Production ==
The first schedule of the film was shot in Punjab with Dhawan, Bajwa and Khurana. Later, the second schedule took place in London with the rest of the team including Kapoor and Fatehi. Katrina Kaif was original choice for lead role, but she opted out, and much later, Kapoor joined the cast. During the May schedule of shooting, she suffered a muscle spasm. The film was wrapped up on 26 July 2019.

== Soundtrack ==
Street Dancer 3D

Soundtrack album by Sachin–Jigar, Tanishk Bagchi, Badshah, Guru Randhawa, Gurinder Seagal and Harsh Upadhyay
- Released: 13 February 2020
- Genre: Feature film soundtrack
- Length: 46:35
- Language: Hindi
- Label: T-Series
External audio
- Official Audio Jukebox on YouTube

The film's music was composed by Sachin–Jigar, Tanishk Bagchi, Badshah, Guru Randhawa, Gurinder Seagal and Harsh Upadhyay while lyrics written by Kumaar, Priya Saraiya, Guru Randhawa, Badshah, Jigar Saraiya, Tanishk Bagchi, Vayu, IP Singh, Bhargav Purohit, Kunaal Vermaa, Garry Sandhu, Shabbir Ahmed, Sameer Anjaan, Millind Gaba and Asli Gold.

The song "Muqabla" from the Tamil film Kaadhalan, which was dubbed in Hindi as Humse Hai Muqabla, was originally composed by A. R. Rahman, lyrics by Vaali in Tamil and P.K. Mishra in Hindi and sung by Mano and Swarnalatha, and then was recreated by Tanishk Bagchi. A version of the song was initially used to promote ABCD: Any Body Can Dance.

The third song "Illegal Weapon 2.0" is a remake of the Punjabi single "Illegal Weapon" featuring Jasmine Sandlas and Garry Sandhu, which was recreated by Bagchi.

The fifth song "Lagdi Lahore Di" is a remake of Guru Randhawa's most viewed song "Lahore", recreated by Randhawa himself in collaboration with Sachin–Jigar.

The sixth song "Hindustani" is a remake of the song "Suno Gaur Se Duniya Walo" originally composed by Shankar–Ehsaan–Loy, lyrics by Sameer Anjaan and sung by Shankar Mahadevan, Udit Narayan, Mahalakshmi Iyer, Domnique, and recreated by Harsh Upadhyay.

The seventh song "Bezubaan Kab Se" is a remake of the song "Bezubaan" from ABCD: Any Body Can Dance, which was held by UTV Music. After the purchase of the rights, lyrics of the remake were written by Jigar Saraiya, one-half of composer duo Sachin–Jigar, who also composed the original, which had lyrics by Mayur Puri.

The eleventh song "Sip Sip 2.0", a promotional song, is a remake of the Punjabi single "Sip Sip", which was recreated by Bagchi.

The final song, "Mile Sur", is a rehash of the popular song of the same name promoting national integration in India and broadcast regularly on National Feast Days, and originally composed by Ashok Patki with Piyush Pandey writing the original Hindi lyrics. Composed by Sachin–Jigar, the rehash version had lyrics written by Saraiya in collaboration with Vayu and IP Singh.

Track listing
No.	Title	Lyrics	Music	Singer(s)	Length
1.	"Muqabla"	Shabbir Ahmed, Tanishk Bagchi	Tanishk Bagchi	Yash Narvekar, Parampara Thakur	2:56
2.	"Garmi"	Badshah	Badshah	Badshah, Neha Kakkar	3:02
3.	"Illegal Weapon 2.0"	Priya Saraiya	Tanishk Bagchi	Jasmine Sandlas, Garry Sandhu	3:08
4.	"Dua Karo"	Priya Saraiya	Sachin–Jigar	Arijit Singh, Bohemia, Sachin–Jigar	4:29
5.	"Lagdi Lahore Di"	Guru Randhawa	Sachin–Jigar, Guru Randhawa	Guru Randhawa, Tulsi Kumar	3:35
6.	"Hindustani"	Sameer Anjaan	Harsh Upadhyay	Shankar Mahadevan, Udit Narayan	2:26
7.	"Bezubaan Kab Se"	Jigar Saraiya	Sachin–Jigar	Siddharth Basrur, Jubin Nautiyal, Sachin–Jigar	4:31
8.	"Pind"	Kunaal Vermaa	Gurinder Seagal	Gurinder Seagal	5:36
9.	"Nachi Nachi"	Millind Gaba, Asli Gold	Sachin–Jigar	Neeti Mohan, Dhvani Bhanushali, Millind Gaba	3:19
10.	"Gann Deva"	Bhargav Purohit	Sachin–Jigar	Divya Kumar, Sachin–Jigar	4:01
11.	"Sip Sip 2.0"	Garry Sandhu, Kumaar	Tanishk Bagchi	Garry Sandhu, Jasmine Sandlas	3:39
12.	"Mile Sur"	Jigar Saraiya, Vayu, IP Singh	Sachin–Jigar	Navraj Hans, Shalmali Kholgade, Divya Kumar, Vayu, Shashwat Singh, IP Singh, Rakesh Maini	5:53
Total length:					46:35

== Marketing and release ==
A first look poster of Dhawan in the film was unveiled on 27 May, with the release date. In the poster, it was shown that film to be released on 24 January 2020.

== Reception ==
=== Box office ===
Street Dancer 3D earned ₹9.50 crore at the domestic box office on its opening day. On the second day, the film collected ₹12.50 crore, and on the third day, it collected ₹17 crore, taking the total opening weekend collection to ₹39 crore.

As of 28 February 2020, with a gross of ₹81.29 crore in India and ₹15.71 crore overseas, the film has a worldwide gross collection of ₹97 crore.

=== Critical reception ===
On the review aggregator website Rotten Tomatoes, 9% of 11 critics' reviews are positive, with an average rating of 4/10.
