= ABCD 2 =

2015 Indian film by Remo D'Souza

- Theatrical release poster
- Directed by: Remo D'Souza
- Written by: Dialogues and Lyrics: Mayur Puri; Screenplay: Remo D'Souza; Tushar Hiranandani
- Story by: Remo D'Souza
- Produced by: Siddharth Roy Kapur
- Starring: Prabhu Deva; Varun Dhawan; Shraddha Kapoor; Sushant Pujari; Lauren Gottlieb; Raghav Juyal; Punit Pathak; Dharmesh Yelande
- Cinematography: Vijay Kumar Arora
- Edited by: Manan Ajay Sagar
- Music by: Sachin–Jigar
- Production company: Walt Disney Pictures
- Distributed by: UTV Motion Pictures
- Release date: 19 June 2015
- Running time: 154 minutes
- Country: India
- Language: Hindi
- Budget: ₹50 crore
- Box office: est. ₹161.49 crore

Disney's ABCD 2, also known as Any Body Can Dance 2, is a 2015 Indian Hindi-language dance drama film directed and choreographed by Remo D'Souza and produced by Siddharth Roy Kapur under Walt Disney Pictures. A stand-alone sequel to the 2013 film ABCD: Any Body Can Dance, the film stars Prabhu Deva, Varun Dhawan and Shraddha Kapoor in the lead roles alongside Sushant Pujari, and is partially inspired by the real life accounts of Suresh Mukund and Vernon Monteiro, played respectively by Dhawan and Pujari, founders of the "fictitious dance crew" The Kings, who went on to win the World Hip Hop Dance Championship in San Diego.

ABCD 2 was released by UTV Motion Pictures on 19 June 2015 in 3D, and was one of Disney's only two original musical films in the Indian market, with Sachin–Jigar composing the soundtrack and background score, while Mayur Puri wrote the dialogues and lyrics. The decommissioned warship INS Vikrant was featured as a backdrop behind the dancers' practice area during the first half of the film. D'Souza and Tushar Hiranandani wrote the screenplay.

ABCD 2 earned mixed to positive reviews, with praise for its production design, choreography, music and the performances of Deva, Dhawan and Kapoor, while criticism was aimed at its writing and length.

ABDC 2 - The Official Game, a dance mobile video game was developed by Indiagames Ltd. and released along with the film.

== Plot ==
Suresh “Suru” Mukund, a waiter from Nalasopara, Mumbai, dreams of becoming a successful dancer and fulfilling the wish of his late mother, Durgadevi. Along with his childhood friends Vernon Monteiro, a pizza delivery boy, and Vinita “Vinnie” Sharma, a hairdresser and aspiring hip-hop dancer, he forms the Mumbai Stunners. They enter the national competition *Hum Kisi Se Kum Nahin* but are disqualified after their routine is exposed as a copy of a Philippine All Stars performance. Branded cheaters, the humiliated dancers return to their former jobs, while several angry members leave the group, worsening its already damaged reputation.

Determined to restore their honor, Suru reunites the group and plans to enter the World Dance Championship in Las Vegas. After witnessing the talent of Vishnu, a troubled dancer visiting Suru’s bar, he asks him to become their choreographer. Vishnu repeatedly refuses because of the team’s past cheating, but Suru confronts him about his own unfulfilled dreams. Vishnu eventually accepts, and auditions are held to form the Indian Stunners. Despite being mocked at the Bangalore qualifiers, the team earns another chance after Vishnu appeals to the audience and advances by delivering an original performance.

The team needs ₹25 lakh to travel to Las Vegas. Shetty Anna, Suru’s employer, refuses the financial assistance he had previously promised and insults Vinnie, prompting Suru to leave angrily. After Suru loses hope, Vishnu obtains the money from Crocxz’s uncle. Vinod, a deaf and nonverbal dancer, subsequently discovers that Vishnu has a private motive for going to Las Vegas. Vishnu joined the team partly because the trip would allow him to visit Manu, his estranged son.

After the team clears the Las Vegas qualifiers, Vishnu secretly leaves the hotel with its money to find Manu. Vishnu’s former wife, Swati, has remarried, but Manu recognizes his father and knows about his dancing achievements. Vishnu leaves the meeting emotionally satisfied. Meanwhile, Vinnie is injured by excessive rehearsing and is replaced by Olive, an American dancer of partial Indian descent.

When the other dancers realize that Vishnu has checked out of the hotel and taken the team’s money with him, they panic and prepare to leave. Although furious, Suru refuses to give up and confronts them about their reaction. He reminds them that they came to Las Vegas to redeem their reputation, represent India, and dance—not merely to follow one choreographer or win money. His speech ends the argument and convinces everyone to stay. Suru then attempts to lead the rehearsals himself, but his efforts prove unsuccessful. He later clashes with the German team, during which Vishnu returns and intervenes. Vishnu apologizes for leaving without informing the team, revealing that he went to visit with his estranged son. Suru forgives him, reinstates him as the team’s choreographer, and reunites the Indian Stunners, who subsequently advance to the final.

As rehearsals continue, Olive becomes close to Suru, making Vinnie jealous. Vinnie confronts Suru, who initially struggles to confess his love because they have been best friends since childhood. He finally admits his feelings, and they become a couple. Although Olive also likes Suru, her conversation with Vinnie helps her accept that his warmth and charm are natural parts of his personality. After Vinnie recovers, Olive agrees to continue performing with the team.

Before the finale begins, the Indian Stunners receive worldwide praise, including from the judges who originally disqualified them. During the final, Vinod’s tuberculosis worsens as the dancers attempt a major formation. He collapses, causing the formation to break, while D, who knows about his illness, tries to support him. The team nearly gives up, but Vinod encourages Suru to continue. The dancers resume their performance and successfully complete the formation with Vinod at its base. Although the Indian Stunners do not win the championship, their courage and unity win the hearts of millions. In a concluding voice-over, Suru recalls his mother’s lessons about dance. By performing honestly and persevering through adversity, the team finally overcomes its reputation as cheaters and reclaims its honor.

== Cast ==
- Prabhu Deva as Vishnu
- Varun Dhawan as Suresh "Suru" Mukund
  - Tyler Mizak as Young Suresh
- Shraddha Kapoor as Vinita "Vinnie" Sharma
- Sushant Pujari as Vernon Monteiro
- Jack Gill as Jack
- Lauren Gottlieb as Olive
- Raghav Juyal as Raghav "Crocxz"
- Dharmesh Yelande as Dharmesh a.k.a. "D"
- Punit Pathak as Vinod
- Tisca Chopra as Swati Kashyap, Vishnu's ex-wife
- Murali Sharma as Shetty Anna
- Pavan Rao as Pavan
- Dipak Salve as Dipak
- Sandip Sable as Sandi
- Nikhil Kasare as Nikhil
- Prachi Shah as Padmashree Durga Devi, Suru's deceased mother
- Alina Kumar as Mayuri
- Sumeet Pendam as Sumeet
- Jineet Rath as Manav 'Manu' Kashyap, Vishnu's son
- Pooja Batra in a special appearance as Pooja Kohli
- Shashank Khaitan in a friendly appearance as a local judge in the Bengaluru qualifiers
- Kapil Sharma as himself
- Navjot Singh Sidhu as himself

== Filming ==
ABCD 2 was shot in Mumbai, Bangalore and Las Vegas. the shooting was finally over in March 2015. The young-talented French duo Les Twins (Laurent and Larry Bourgeois) were also roped in for a special freestyle dance in the song "Tattoo". Kapoor is known to have celebrated her 26th birthday on the sets of the film with a Disney princess cake.

== Release ==
ABCD 2 was released by UTV Motion Pictures, a Disney subsidiary, on 19 June 2015. However, D'Souza wanted to pre-release it on 18 June 2015 due to the beginning of the Muslim holy month of Ramadan. He stated, We just come to know that the Holy month of Ramadan starts on 19 June, the day we have scheduled the release of ABCD 2. I've been receiving so many emails and messages from my Muslim friends requesting not to release on that day, as they would be unable to go for the film.

== Critical reception ==
On the review aggregation website Rotten Tomatoes, the film has a rating of 58%, based on 12 reviews, with an average rating of 6/10. Anupama Chopra gave 2.5 out of 5 stars and said "Taking a cue from Hollywood's Step Up series, director-choreographer Remo D'Souza packs in a television dance competition, several elaborate dance sequences, a romantic rivalry and the requisite rich-poor divide."

Meena Iyre from The Times of India gave it 3 out of 5 stars stating the film raises the bar from its first part. Sukanya Verma of Rediff liked the choreography but thought that "because of its poorly paced beginning, ABCD 2 feels a bit of stretch at 154 minutes." She gave the film 2.5 out of 5 stars. Rajeev Masand of CNN-IBN also gave the film 2.5 out of 5 stars writing that the film "makes up for its amateurish storytelling with its often jaw-dropping set pieces and the sheer hard work of its leads. Varun and Shraddha are so earnest, you're willing to forgive their less-than-convincing histrionics because their dancing – particularly Varun's – is mighty impressive. Both actors hold their own against the professionals without losing face."

The film got a negative review from Shubhra Gupta of The Indian Express who gave it 1.5 out of 5 stars. She wrote "A dance movie needs to electrify. That's missing in this Shraddha Kapoor, Varun Dhawan starrer".

== Soundtrack ==
ABCD 2

Soundtrack album by Sachin–Jigar
- Released: 22 May 2015
- Genre: Feature film soundtrack
- Length: 43:33
- Language: Hindi
- Label: Zee Music Company

Sachin–Jigar chronology
Badlapur (2015)	ABCD 2 (2015)	Hero (2015)
External audio
- Audio Jukebox on YouTube

Distributed and released by Zee Music Company as part of its 2-year contract with Disney, the soundtrack and background score of ABCD 2 is composed entirely by Sachin Sanghvi and Jigar Saraiya under the Sachin–Jigar alias, while the lyrics were written by Mayur Puri, with Badshah, Rimi Nique and D. Soldierz providing additional lyrics, while Priya Saraiya guest-wrote and sang the song "Sun Saathiya", a scratch version of which was featured in ABCD: Any Body Can Dance. The audio album was released on 22 May 2015.

A reprised, uncredited version of "Vande Mataram" appears during the end credits. The version is crooned by Sachin and Jigar.

A reprise version of "Bezubaan Phir Se" was also released, crooned by Shraddha Kapoor and Neel Sharma, with the English rap written by Sharma and the Hindi lyrics borrowed from Puri.

All music is composed by Sachin–Jigar.

No.	Title	Lyrics	Singer(s)	Length
1.	"Bezubaan Phir Se"	Mayur Puri	Vishal Dadlani, Anushka Manchanda, Madhav Krishna	4:32
2.	"Sun Saathiya"	Priya Saraiya	Priya Saraiya, Divya Kumar	3:38
3.	"Chunar"	Mayur Puri	Arijit Singh, Crescendo Vocals by: Divya Kumar	4:29
4.	"Happy Birthday"	D Soldierz, Mayur Puri	Varun Dhawan, Sachin–Jigar, D Soldierz	3:05
5.	"If You Hold My Hand"	Mayur Puri	Benny Dayal, Extended Cut Vocals: Shefali Alvares, Anushka Manchanda	3:33
6.	"Hey Ganaraya"	Mayur Puri	Divya Kumar, Backing Vocals: Rajiv Sundersam, Nikhil Kasarekar	4:52
7.	"Happy Hour"	Mayur Puri	Mika Singh	3:44
8.	"Naach Meri Jaan"	Rimi Nique, Mayur Puri	Benny Dayal, Shalmali Kholgade, Siddharth Basrur, Rimi Nique	4:04
9.	"Tattoo"	Mayur Puri	Shefali Alvares	4:20
10.	"Vande Mataram"	Mayur Puri, Badshah	Daler Mehndi, Tanishka Sanghvi, Badshah, Divya Kumar	7:14
Total length:				43:33

== See also ==
- ABCD: Any Body Can Dance
- Street Dancer 3D, 2020 Indian dance film, originally titled ABCD 3 as a planned sequel but later released as a standalone feature

== Awards and nominations ==
Year	Award Ceremony	Category	Recipient(s) and nominee(s)	Result	Ref.
2015	Mirchi Music Awards	Song of the Year	"Chunar"	Nominated	
2015	Mirchi Music Awards	Album of the Year	Sachin–Jigar, Mayur Puri, Priya Saraiya	Nominated	
2015	Mirchi Music Awards	Male Vocalist of the Year	Arijit Singh – "Chunar"	Nominated	
2015	Mirchi Music Awards	Music Composer of the Year	Sachin–Jigar – "Chunar"	Nominated	
2015	Mirchi Music Awards	Lyricist of the Year	Mayur Puri – "Chunar"	Nominated	
2015	Mirchi Music Awards	Upcoming Female Vocalist of The Year	Shraddha Kapoor – "Bezubaan Phir Se (Unplugged)"	Nominated	
2015	Mirchi Music Awards	Best Song Engineer (Recording & Mixing)	Eric Pillai – "Sun Saathiya"	Nominated	
2015	Mirchi Music Awards	Best Background Score	Sachin–Jigar	Nominated	
