= Shakti Mohan =

Indian dancer and choreographer (born 1985)

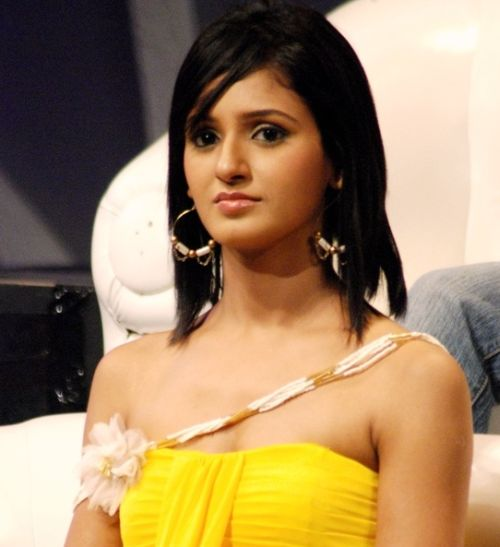
- Mohan in 2013
- Born: 12 October 1985 (age 40); Delhi, India
- Occupations: Dancer; choreographer
- Years active: 2009–present
- Relatives: Neeti Mohan (elder sister); Kriti Mohan (older sister); Mukti Mohan (younger sister)

Shakti Mohan (born 12 October 1985) is an Indian dancer, choreographer and television personality. She is the winner of Zee TV's dance reality show Dance India Dance 2. Mohan has been a judge and captain of Indian reality show Dance Plus since its inception.

== Career ==
Following her victory in the second season of Dance India Dance, Shakti produced dance-themed calendars for 2012 and 2013. She was cast in the fictional dance based teen series Dil Dosti Dance (2011) as main lead character. In 2012, she collaborated with the composer Mohammed Fairouz on a BBC-sponsored dance project in New York City. In 2013, Mohan launched a YouTube channel with dance instruction videos. She was also a contestant and finalist on Jhalak Dikhhla Jaa (2014).

She then became the judge and mentor in the dance competition reality show Dance Plus for Seasons 1–4 and also judged the show Dance Singapore Dance. Her first song as a choreographer in Bollywood is "Nainowale Ne" in the movie Padmaavat. In 2020, Shakti choreographed a song for Ranbir Kapoor in the film Shamshera directed by Karan Malhotra. The film was released in July 2022. Shakti has also been a part of a L’Oréal Paris campaign in 2020.

She has appeared in the music videos Kamli (2013), Akh Lad Jaave Nritya Jam (2018), Kanha Re (2018), Aakhri Baar (2019), ‘The Chamiya Song’ (2019) and ‘Saaton Janam’ (2020).

Shakti Mohan, with her brand NrityaShakti for dance production, has produced two webshows on YouTube named Break A Leg Season 1 and 2. She is the younger sister of the singer Neeti Mohan and elder sister of the dancer and actress Mukti Mohan, also produced a dance music video with her sisters.

== Filmography ==
Key
†	Denotes films that have not yet been released

=== Films ===
Year	Title	Role	Notes	Ref.
2010	High School Musical 2	special appearance in song	Appeared in the song "All For One"	
2010	Tees Maar Khan	special appearance in song	Appeared in the song "Tees Maar Khan"	
2012	Rowdy Rathore	special appearance in song	Appeared in the song "Aa Re Pritam Pyaarre"	
2012	Sukoon	special appearance in song	Album by Vaishali Made	
2013	Dhoom 3	Assistant Choreographer	Song – "Kamli"	
2014	Kaanchi	special appearance in song	Appeared in the song "Kambal Ke Neeche"	
2014	Samrat & Co	special appearance in song	Appeared in the song "Tequila Wakila"	
2018	Padmaavat	Choreographer	Song – "Nainowale Ne"	
2018	Nawabzaade	Item number	Appeared in the song "Amma Dekh"	
2022	Shamshera	Choreographer	Song - "Hunkara"	

=== Television ===
Year	Title	Role	Notes
2009–2010	Dance India Dance 2	Contestant	Winner
2010	Nachle Ve with Saroj Khan	Contestant	
2011–2015	Dil Dosti Dance	Kria Ghai	
2011	Preet Se Bandhi Ye Dori Ram Milaayi Jodi	Sonia	Guest
2011	Ek Hazaaron Mein Meri Behna Hai	Kriya	Guest
2011	Channel V Footloose	Herself	Guest
2011	Dance India Dance 3	Herself	Guest
2012	Punar Vivah - Zindagi Milegi Dobara	Herself	Guest
2012	Main Lakshmi Tere Aangan Ki	Herself	Guest
2013	India's Dancing Superstar	Herself	Guest
2014	Jhalak Dikhhla Jaa 7	Contestant	2nd runner-up
2014	Boogie Woogie	Herself	Guest
2014	No More Kamzor	Herself	Guest
2014	Comedy Nights with Kapil	Herself	Guest
2015	Thank You Maa	Herself	Guest
2015	Dance India Dance Super Moms	Herself	Guest
2015	Dance Singapore Dance	Judge	
2015	Dance Plus 1	Mentor	
2016	Dance Plus 2	Mentor	
2017	Dance Plus 3	Mentor	
2018	Dance Plus 4	Mentor	
2018	Kitchen Champion 5	Herself	Guest
2019	Nach Baliye 9	Herself	Guest
2020	India's Best Dancer	Herself	Guest
2020	Dance With Me	Host	
2021	Dance Deewane 3	Herself	Guest
2021	Dance With Me 2	Host	
2021	Dance Plus 6	Mentor	Winning Captain
2022	The Great Indian Murder	Herself	Special appearance in the song "Raskala"
2023	Dance Plus pro	Mentor	Winning Captain
2025	Hip hop india season 2	herself	guest judge

=== Music videos ===
Year	Title	Singer	Ref.
2018	Kanha Re	Neeti Mohan	
2018	Akh Lad Jaave Nritya Jam	Jubin Nautiyal	
2019	Aakhri Baar	Palash Muchhal	
2019	The Chamiya Song	DJ Bravo, Gaurav Dagaonkar, Rimi Nique	
2020	Saaton Janam	Ishaan Khan, Shambhavi Thakur	
2022	Mud Mud Ke	Tony Kakkar, Neha Kakkar	
2022	Chumma Chumma	Nakash Aziz, Neeti Mohan	
2023	Daayein Baayein	Yasser Desai	
2023	Savariya	Neeti Mohan	

== See also ==
- List of dancers
- Mukti Mohan
