= Shraddha Kapoor =

Indian actress (born 1987)

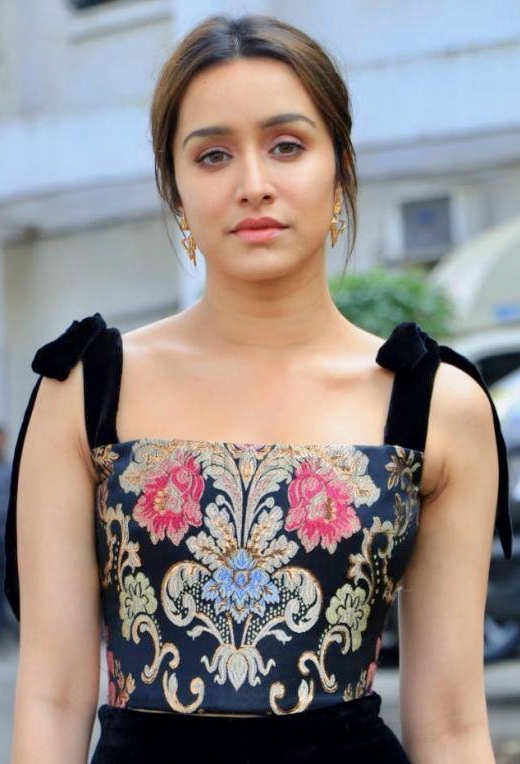
- Kapoor in 2020
- Born: 3 March 1987 (age 39); Bombay, Maharashtra, India (present-day Mumbai)
- Occupation: Actress
- Years active: 2010–present
- Father: Shakti Kapoor
- Family: Kapoor family

Shraddha Kapoor (born 3 March 1987) is an Indian actress who primarily works in Hindi films. One of India's highest-paid actresses, Kapoor has been featured in Forbes India's Celebrity 100 list since 2014 and was featured by Forbes Asia in their 30 Under 30 list of 2016.

The daughter of actor Shakti Kapoor, she began her acting career with a brief role in the 2010 heist film Teen Patti, for which she received a nomination for the Filmfare Award for Best Female Debut, followed by her first leading role in the teen drama Luv Ka The End (2011), but both films failed to propel her career forward. Kapoor had her breakthrough with Mohit Suri's romantic musical Aashiqui 2 (2013), which earned her a nomination for the Filmfare Award for Best Actress. She received critical appreciation for playing a character inspired by Ophelia in Vishal Bhardwaj's acclaimed drama Haider (2014)

She went on to establish herself with starring roles in the romantic thriller Ek Villain (2014), the dance drama ABCD 2 (2015), and the action film Baaghi (2016). After a series of poorly received releases, Kapoor regained commercial success with the comedies Chhichhore (2019) and Tu Jhoothi Main Makkaar (2023), the action thriller Saaho (2019), and the Maddock Horror Comedy Universe films Stree (2018) and its sequel Stree 2 (2024). The latter emerged as her highest-grossing release and earned her a second Filmfare Award nomination for Best Actress.

In addition to acting, Kapoor has sung several songs for her films. She is also a prominent celebrity endorser and, in 2015, launched her own clothing line. On Instagram, she is the most-followed Indian woman.

== Early life and background ==
Kapoor was born and raised in Mumbai. On her father's side, Kapoor is of Punjabi descent, and on her mother's side, she is of Marathi and Konkani descent. Her maternal grandfather, Pandharinath Kolhapure's, (the nephew of Deenanath Mangeshkar and maternal first cousin of Lata Mangeshkar and Asha Bhosle) paternal family hailed from Kolhapur and her maternal grandmother hailed from Panaji, Goa. In an interview with The Hindustan Times, Kapoor revealed that, she was raised in a Marathi cultural setting as her maternal relatives lived in Maharashtra. She has said that she went through a tomboyish phase as a child and described herself as having a strong attitude, because of which she was deliberately picking fights with boys.

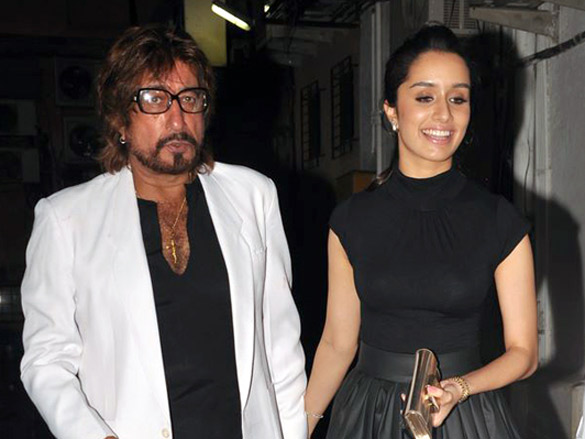
Kapoor with her father Shakti Kapoor, who appeared in a cameo in her debut film.

Kapoor's family members include her father Shakti Kapoor and mother Shivangi Kapoor, her elder brother Siddhanth Kapoor, her two aunts Padmini Kolhapure and Tejaswini Kolhapure, who, besides her mother, are all actors in Indian Cinema. She is the great-niece of Lata Mangeshkar, Asha Bhosle, Meena Khadikar, Usha Mangeshkar and Hridaynath Mangeshkar. Hailing from a family of actors, Kapoor desired to become an actress since a young age. Wearing her parents' clothes, she used to rehearse film dialogues and dance to Bollywood songs in front of the mirror. She also accompanied her father to various shooting locations in her childhood. During one of David Dhawan's shoots, Kapoor befriended actor Varun Dhawan, to play with him, and they were holding a torch pretending it to be a camera while delivering film lines to each other, and they were also dancing to Govinda's film songs.

Kapoor did her schooling at Jamnabai Narsee School and at the age of 15, she shifted to the American School of Bombay where she was schoolmates with Tiger Shroff and Athiya Shetty. In an interview with The Times of India, Shetty revealed that they all used to participate in dance competitions. Believing herself to be competitive at the age of 17, Kapoor played soccer and handball as she thought these games were challenging. Kapoor then enrolled in Boston University to major in psychology, but she left in her first year to appear in her debut film after she was seen on Facebook by producer Ambika Hinduja, who cast her for a role in Teen Patti. In an interview with Filmfare, Shakti Kapoor revealed that Kapoor was barely 16 years old when she was offered her first film, Lucky: No Time for Love (2005) by Salman Khan, after he saw one of her school play performances, but she rejected the proposal as she was aspiring to become a psychologist. Kapoor was trained as a singer since her childhood as her maternal grandfather and mother are classical singers.

== Career ==
=== Early work and breakthrough (2010–2015) ===
Kapoor made her acting debut in the 2010 thriller Teen Patti, alongside Amitabh Bachchan, Ben Kingsley and R. Madhavan. She played the role of a college girl. The film received generally negative reviews, though her performance was better received. Preeti Arora, writing for Rediff.com said, "though a bit raw, she has a lot of potential." Nikhat Kazmi reviewed: "Shraddha Kapoor makes an interesting debut as the edgy youngster who sheds her specs for sleaze, with alacrity." The film failed to do well at the box office; however Kapoor's performance earned her a nomination for the Filmfare Award for Best Female Debut. Kapoor admitted that after her debut film’s failure, she faced a "dull phase" in her career as production houses were hesitant to collaborate with her, leaving her without work.

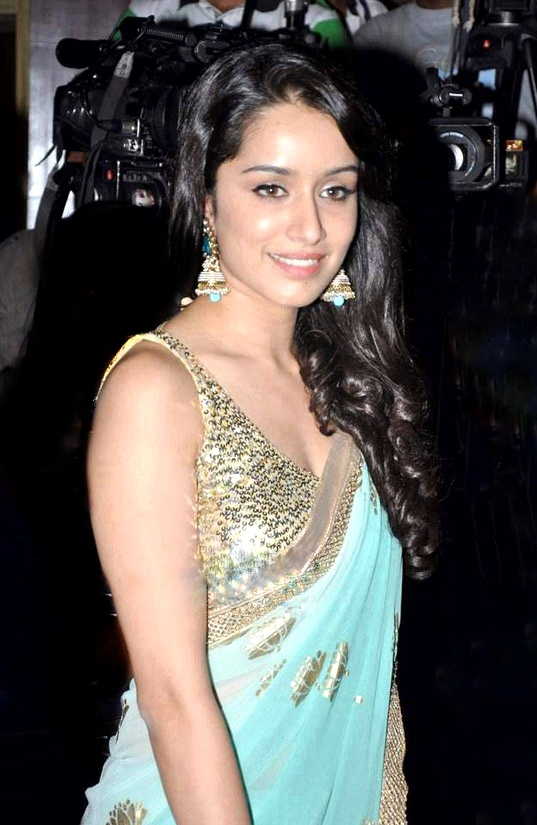
Kapoor at an event for Aashiqui 2 in 2013

After her debut, she signed a three-film deal with Yash Raj Films and featured in their 2011 teen comedy Luv Ka The End, with Taaha Shah. Kapoor portrayed the lead role of a teenage student who plots against her boyfriend after he cheats on her. The film underperformed at the box office and received mixed reviews from critics. However, Kapoor's performance received positive critical reviews. Taran Adarsh wrote: "Shraddha is a revelation, catching you unaware with a confident performance. She's electrifying in the sequence when she breaks down after getting to know the true intentions of her lover." For her performance, Kapoor received the Stardust Searchlight Award for Best Actress. Kapoor was subsequently offered the lead female role in Aurangzeb (2013) as a part of her deal with Yash Raj Films. However, she signed on to Vishesh Films' Aashiqui 2 (2013) instead, thereby cancelling the three-film contract with Yash Raj Films.

In 2013, Kapoor found her breakthrough role in Mohit Suri's romantic musical Aashiqui 2, the sequel to the 1990 film Aashiqui. She was cast as Aarohi Keshav Shirke, a small-town bar singer who becomes a successful playback artist with the help of a popular male singer (played by Aditya Roy Kapur). The film was a box office success with a global revenue of ₹1.09 billion (US$11 million). Film critic Anupama Chopra called Kapoor a "real triumph" and added that her "porcelain face has a haunting vulnerability". However, Vinayak Chakravorty of India Today wrote that she "looks pretty though fails to add spark". Kapoor received several nominations in the Best Actress category, including her first at the Filmfare Awards. The same year, she also appeared in a guest appearance for the romantic comedy Gori Tere Pyaar Mein, playing the fiancée of Imran Khan's character.

Kapoor next reunited with Suri for the romantic thriller Ek Villain (2014), in which she also made her singing debut with the song "Galliyan". The film tells the story of a hardened criminal (played by Sidharth Malhotra) whose terminally-ill wife (played by Kapoor) is brutally murdered by a serial killer (played by Riteish Deshmukh). The film was generally perceived to be plagiarised from the Korean film I Saw the Devil (2010), although Suri claimed that it was an original film. In her review, Raedita Tandon of Filmfare called the film a "gritty, engaging thriller", and stated that Kapoor was a revelation in it. The film eventually emerged as a major commercial success with domestic revenues of over ₹1 billion (US$10 million). Her second release that year was Vishal Bhardwaj's highly acclaimed ensemble drama Haider, an adaptation of William Shakespeare's Hamlet, set during the Kashmir conflict of 1995. She played the Ophelia-based character, a journalist named Arshia, opposite Shahid Kapoor and Tabu. Writing for Deccan Chronicle, critic Kusumita Das praised Kapoor's effort in capturing the varied nuances of her character and noted that her portrayal was "surprisingly composed". Also that year, Kapoor performed an item number "Dance Basanti" in the Karan Johar-produced thriller Ungli.

In 2015, Kapoor starred in a sequel to the dance film ABCD: Any Body Can Dance (2013), entitled ABCD 2. She portrayed the role of Vinita Sharma, a hip-hop dancer who competes in an international hip-hop competition alongside her childhood friend (essayed by Varun Dhawan). In preparation for her role, she learned different genres of dance form from choreographers Prabhu Deva and Remo D'Souza. Produced by Walt Disney Pictures, the film earned ₹1.57 billion (US$16 million) worldwide to become her most widely-seen film to that point.

=== Career fluctuations (2016–2017) ===
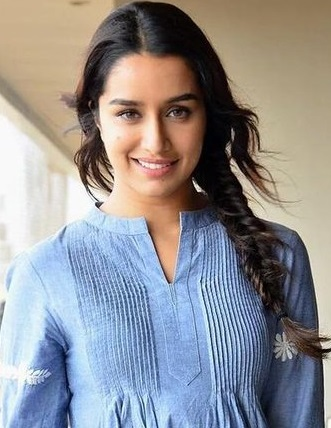
Kapoor promoting Baaghi in 2016

Kapoor began 2016 by featuring as star Tiger Shroff's love interest in the action film Baaghi, about a pair of rebellious lovers set against the backdrop of a martial arts school. The role required her to practice Kalaripayattu (a martial art originating in the south of India). Shubhra Gupta of The Indian Express considered her character in it to be dated, but thought that she played the romantic and action sequences "well enough". Commercially, the film performed well and collected a total of ₹1.26 billion (US$13 million). Kapoor's final release in 2016 was the rock musical drama Rock On 2, a sequel to 2008's Rock On!!. She was cast alongside Farhan Akhtar, Arjun Rampal and Prachi Desai. She played the role of Jiah Sharma, an introverted singer and keyboard player, who suffers a neglectful relationship with her father. To prepare, she spent time reading books in isolation and undertook vocal training under the singer Samantha Edwards. Namrata Joshi of The Hindu disliked the film and considered Kapoor's performance "self-consciously meek and submissive". Rock On 2 did not recoup its ₹450 million (US$4.7 million) investment, thus emerging as a commercial failure at the box office.

In 2017, Kapoor starred in Shaad Ali's romantic drama Ok Jaanu, in her second collaboration with Aditya Roy Kapur. A remake of Mani Ratnam's Tamil romantic drama O Kadhal Kanmani (2015), the film was produced by Karan Johar under the banner of Dharma Productions. It received mixed reviews from critics and Kapoor's performance was generally noted as inferior to Nithya Menen's. Kapoor next appeared in the romance Half Girlfriend, in which she was paired opposite Arjun Kapoor. It was based on Chetan Bhagat's novel of the same name, and reunited her with director Mohit Suri. In a review of the latter film, Raja Sen of NDTV considered it to be a "preposterously dimwitted romance" and criticised Kapoor as "shrill and insubstantial". Later in 2017, Kapoor appeared in Apoorva Lakhia's Haseena Parkar, a biopic of terrorist Dawood Ibrahim's sister, who ran a crime ring of her own. Kapoor played the titular role, alongside her brother Siddhanth Kapoor, who essayed Ibrahim's character. The film was panned by critics upon release; Anna M. M. Vetticad of Firstpost considered Kapoor's performance to be as "bland as the screenplay", adding "she tries to appear mature and menacing, but the effort shows too much". None of her 2017 releases performed well at the box office.

=== Further commercial success (2018–present) ===
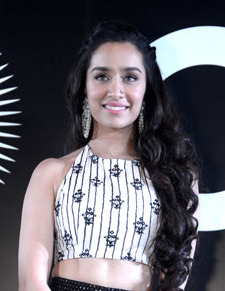
Kapoor in 2018

Kapoor next starred opposite Rajkummar Rao in the comedy horror Stree (2018). Based on the legend of Nale Ba, the film featured her as a mysterious, unnamed woman who falls in love with Rao's character. The critic Saibal Chatterjee took note of the film's feminist subtext and found Kapoor to be "suitably icy as the enigmatic woman". Rajeev Masand opined that she "blends in nicely as the alluring out-of-towner with an air of mystery around her".

With gross earnings of over ₹1.7 billion (US$18 million), Stree emerged as her highest-grossing release to that point. In the same year, Kapoor reteamed with Shahid Kapoor in Batti Gul Meter Chalu, a social problem film about electricity issues in rural India. She agreed to the project due to the social message she found in the script. Filming was marred with dispute when the studio KriArj Entertainment failed to remunerate the crew. Following a brief hiatus, production resumed after Bhushan Kumar took over the project. Writing for India Today, Charu Thakur noted that Kapoor "needs to go a long way as far as her acting skills are concerned".

Kapoor was committed to star in a biopic of badminton player Saina Nehwal, directed by Amole Gupte, but after filming for a few days she opted out of the project citing a scheduling conflict. She began 2019 by playing the leading lady opposite Prabhas in Sujeeth's Telugu-Hindi bilingual action film Saaho. Budgeted at ₹3.5 billion (US$36 million), it is one of the most expensive Indian films produced. In a scathing review for Mid-Day, Mayank Shekhar dismissed her part as "rather pale and pointless". The Telugu version of the film did not perform well, but its Hindi version was a commercial success. Her next film release was Nitesh Tiwari's Chhichhore, a comedy-drama about college life, co-starring Sushant Singh Rajput. Udita Jhunjhunwala of Mint labelled it a "lively homage to hostel life" and added "in spite of a sketchy role, Kapoor delivers a moving and likeable performance". With a worldwide gross of over ₹2 billion (US$21 million), the film emerged as one of her most successful.

Kapoor began the new decade by reuniting with Dhawan in the dance film Street Dancer 3D (2020), which Namrata Joshi termed a "compilation of indistinguishable performances". It failed at the box office. She then reteamed with Shroff in the spiritual sequel Baaghi 3. The film was panned by critics and underperformed commercially as theatres were shut due to the COVID-19 pandemic. WION's Shomini Sen termed the film "an assault to the brain" and criticised the stereotypical portrayal of Kapoor's character of a "liberated woman" that is "foul-mouthed, aggressive and glamorous".

Kapoor in 2023

After a three-year hiatus, which she described as "unforeseen and forced" due to the pandemic, Kapoor starred alongside Ranbir Kapoor in Luv Ranjan's romantic comedy Tu Jhoothi Main Makkaar (2023). Hindustan Times' Monika Rawal Kukreja praised her styling and look, adding that she "delivers a very controlled performance though she goes a bit overboard in the emotionally charged scenes". It emerged as a moderate commercial success. In 2024, Kapoor reprised her role in the sequel Stree 2, as part of the Maddock Horror Comedy Universe. Writing for Hindustan Times, Rishabh Suri was appreciative of Kapoor's performance but felt that she had been overshadowed by others in the ensemble due to her limited screen time, while Tushar Joshi of India Today opined that she brought "the right blend of mystery and intrigue". Stree 2 emerged as the highest-grossing Hindi film of 2024 as well as the seventh highest-grossing Hindi film of all time, with a worldwide gross of over ₹8.75 billion (US$91 million). For her performance, Kapoor received her second Best Actress nomination at Filmfare. She will next star in Laxman Utekar's Eetha, a biopic about the life of Indian dancer Vithabai Bhau Mang Narayangaonkar.

== Other work and media image ==
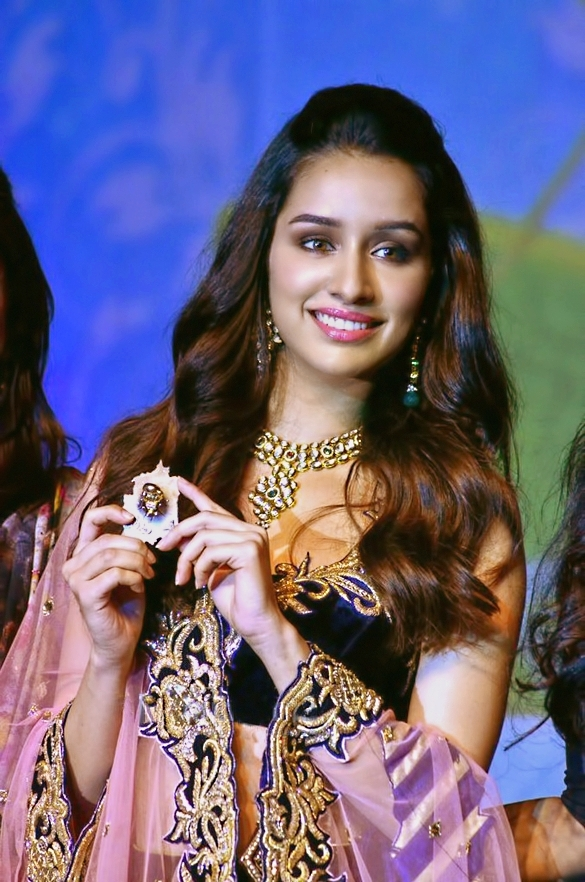
Kapoor in 2014

In addition to acting in films, Kapoor has supported charitable organisations, performed for stage shows and sang in her films. She has also ramp walked in the Lakme Fashion Week for various fashion designers and has been the cover model for several magazines. Kapoor is the brand ambassador of several products, including Lakmé, Veet, Lipton, Marico's Hair & Care and many others. Bollywood Hungama named her "one of the most wanted names" in the advertising industry. Later, in March 2015, she launched her own line of clothing for women, named Imara, in association with Amazon. In 2021, she invested in the beverage brand Shunya.

Kapoor has established herself as one of the most popular celebrities in India. In 2013, a poll conducted by the Indian edition of FHM ranked her fifth in their listing of the world's sexiest actresses. In 2014, she was placed at the seventeenth position and the following year she was placed at the second position in McAfee's most-searched celebrities poll. Google Trends stated that Kapoor was one of the most-searched Indian actresses between 2014 and 2015. Rediff.com placed her in their listing of the top 10 Bollywood actresses in 2014. Kapoor was placed seventh on The Times of India's listing of the Most Desirable Women in 2014 and 2015. In 2015, the Indian edition of the International Business Times press positioned her fourth among the top actresses and Rediff.com featured her among the top earners. Box Office India ranked Kapoor as the third most successful Hindi film actress in their 2023 report.

Kapoor is among the highest-paid actresses in India. Between 2014 and 2019, Forbes India featured her in their annual Celebrity 100 list. In 2016, Forbes Asia featured her as one of the most successful Asians under the age of 30. Kapoor has also gained recognition for her dressing sense. Various media outlets have praised her sense of style, and she has been considered for ramp walks by several fashion designers. In 2016, she was featured among the highest-paid actresses of Bollywood with a total earning of ₹50 million (US$520,000) per film. In 2018, Eastern Eye featured her as one of the eight sexiest women in Bollywood. In 2020, she was named the Hottest Vegetarian by Peta India. In 2021, she was featured in a documentary titled Tails of Boo Boo & Cuddly Poo that highlighted the plight of stray animals. As of August 2024, she is the most-followed Indian woman as well as one of the most-followed people on Instagram.

== Filmography ==
=== Films ===
Key
†	Denotes films that have not yet been released

Year	Title	Role	Notes	Ref.
2010	Teen Patti	Aparna Khanna		
2011	Luv Ka The End	Rhea Dialdas		
2013	Aashiqui 2	Arohi Keshav Shirke		
2013	Gori Tere Pyaar Mein	Vasudha Natarajan	Cameo appearance	
2014	Ek Villain	Aisha Verma		
2014	Haider	Arshia Lone		
2014	Ungli	Herself	Special appearance in song "Dance Basanti"	
2015	ABCD 2	Vinita "Vinnie" Sharma		
2016	Baaghi	Siya Khurana		
2016	A Flying Jatt	Herself	Cameo appearance	
2016	Rock On 2	Jiah Sharma		
2017	Ok Jaanu	Tara Agnihotri		
2017	Half Girlfriend	Riya Somani		
2017	Haseena Parkar	Haseena Parkar		
2018	Nawabzaade	Herself	Special appearance in song "High Rated Gabru"	
2018	Stree	Girl with No Name		
2018	Batti Gul Meter Chalu	Lalita "Nauti" Nautiyal		
2019	Saaho	Amritha "Ammu" Nair	Bilingual film (Telugu, Hindi)	
2019	Chhichhore	Maya Sharma Pathak		
2020	Street Dancer 3D	Inayat Naazi		
2020	Baaghi 3	Siya Nandan		
2022	Bhediya	Unnamed	Special appearance in song "Thumkeshwari"	
2023	Tu Jhoothi Main Makkaar	Nisha "Tinni" Malhotra		
2024	Stree 2	She		
2026	Eetha	Vithabai Bhau Mang Narayangaonkar	Filming	

=== Music video appearance ===
Year	Title	Singer(s)	Ref.
2021	"Kill Chori"	Ash King, Nikhita Gandhi	

== Discography ==
Year	Track	Album	Ref.
2014	"Galliyan"	Ek Villain	
2014	"Do Jahaan"	Haider	
2015	"Bezubaan Phir Se"	ABCD 2	
2016	"Sab Tera"	Baaghi	
2016	"Tere Mere Dil"	Rock On 2	
2016	"Udja Re"	Rock On 2	
2016	"Woh Jahaan"	Rock On 2	
2016	"Rock On-Revisited"	Rock On 2	
2017	"Phir Bhi Tumko Chaahungi"	Half Girlfriend	
2021	"Hum Hindustani"	Non-album single	

== Awards and nominations ==
=== Film awards ===
Year	Award	Category	Work	Result	Ref.
2011	Filmfare Awards	Best Female Debut	Teen Patti	Nominated	
2011	International Indian Film Academy Awards	Star Debut of the Year – Female	Teen Patti	Nominated	
2011	Zee Cine Awards	Best Female Debut	Teen Patti	Nominated	
2011	Stardust Awards	Superstar of Tomorrow - Female	Teen Patti	Nominated	
2012	Stardust Awards	Best Actress	Luv Ka The End	Won	
2013	BIG Star Entertainment Awards	Best Romantic Couple	Aashiqui 2	Won	
2013	BIG Star Entertainment Awards	Most Entertaining Film Actor – Female	Aashiqui 2	Nominated	
2013	BIG Star Entertainment Awards	Most Entertaining Actor in a Romantic Role – Female	Aashiqui 2	Nominated	
2013	Hello! Hall of Fame Award	Fresh Face of the Year	Aashiqui 2	Won	
2014	Screen Awards	Best Actress	Aashiqui 2	Nominated	
2014	Screen Awards	Best Actress (Popular Choice)	Aashiqui 2	Nominated	
2014	Screen Awards	Jodi No. 1 (along with Aditya Roy Kapur)	Aashiqui 2	Won	
2014	Star Guild Awards	Jodi of the Year (along with Aditya Roy Kapur)	Aashiqui 2	Won	
2014	Filmfare Awards	Best Actress	Aashiqui 2	Nominated	
2014	International Indian Film Academy Awards	Best Actress	Aashiqui 2	Nominated	
2014	Zee Cine Awards	Best Actor – Female	Aashiqui 2	Nominated	
2014	Zee Cine Awards	Best Actor in a Supporting Role (Female)	Gori Tere Pyaar Mein	Nominated	
2015	Mirchi Music Awards	Upcoming Female Vocalist of the Year (for Do Jahaan)	Haider	Nominated	
2015	Screen Awards	Best Ensemble Cast (along with Shahid Kapoor)	Haider	Nominated	
2015	Stardust Awards	Best Actress in a Drama	Haider	Nominated	
2015	Stardust Awards	Superstar of Tomorrow – Female	Haider	Nominated	
2015	BIG Star Entertainment Awards	Most Entertaining Actor in a Romantic Film – Female	Haider	Nominated	
2015	BIG Star Entertainment Awards	Most Entertaining Actor (Film) – Female	Ek Villain	Nominated	
2015	BIG Star Entertainment Awards	Most Entertaining Actor in a Thriller Film – Female	Ek Villain	Nominated	
2015	Global Indian Music Academy Awards	Best Celebrity Singer of the Year	Ek Villain	Won	
2015	Global Indian Music Academy Awards	Best Music Debut	Ek Villain	Nominated	
2015	Screen Awards	Best Actor Popular (Female)	Ek Villain	Nominated	
2015	Mirchi Music Awards	Upcoming Female Vocalist of the Year (for Galliyan)	Ek Villain	Nominated	
2016	Mirchi Music Awards	Upcoming Female Vocalist of the Year (for Bezubaan Phir Se)	ABCD 2	Nominated	
2016	International Indian Film Academy Awards	Best Actress	ABCD 2	Nominated	
2019	Nickelodeon Kids' Choice Awards India	Favorite Movie Actress	Chhichhore	Won	
2020	Zee Cine Awards	Best Actor – Female	Chhichhore	Nominated	
2024	Iconic Gold Awards	Best Actress of the Year	Tu Jhoothi Main Makkaar	Won	
2024	Zee Cine Awards	Best Actor – Female	Tu Jhoothi Main Makkaar	Nominated	
2024	Pinkvilla Screen and Style Icons Awards	Best Actor (Female) – Popular Choice	Tu Jhoothi Main Makkaar	Nominated	
2025	International Indian Film Academy Awards	Best Actress	Stree 2	Nominated	
2025	Zee Cine Awards	Best Actor – Female	Stree 2	Won	
2025	70th Filmfare Awards	Best Actress	Stree 2	Nominated	

=== Other recognitions ===
Year	Award	Category	Result	Ref.
2015	Star Guild Awards	Shining Superstar	Won	
2020	Nickelodeon Kids' Choice Awards India	Favorite Movie Actress	Won	
2022	Lokmat Stylish Awards	Power Icon	Won	
2023	Bollywood Hungama Style Icons	Mould Breaking Star (Female)	Nominated	
2023	Bollywood Hungama Style Icons	Stylish Trendsetter (Female)	Nominated	
2024	Pinkvilla Screen and Style Icons Awards	Most Stylish Fan Favourite Superstar	Won	
2024	Bollywood Hungama Style Icons	Most Stylish Ground-Breaking Star of the Year	Nominated	
2024	Bollywood Hungama Style Icons	Most Stylish Trendsetting Star of the Year (Female)	Nominated	
2024	Bollywood Hungama Style Icons	Most Stylish Power-Packed Performer of the Year (Female)	Nominated	
