= Nadia Azzi =

American classical pianist (born 1998)

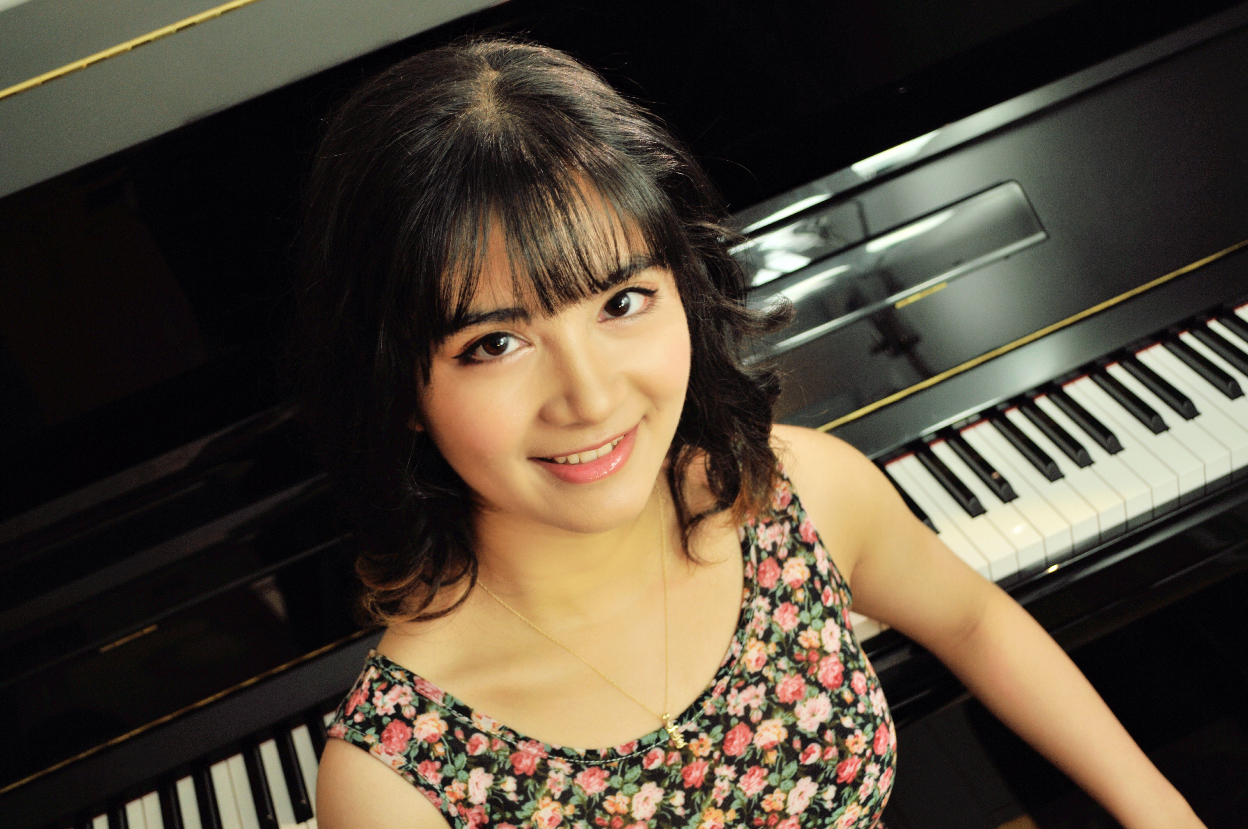
- Azzi in 2015

Background information
- Born: August 11, 1998 (age 27); Dunedin, Florida, U.S.
- Genres: Classical music
- Occupation: Musician
- Instrument: Piano
- Years active: 2010–present
- Website: nadiaazzi.com

Nadia Azzi (born August 11, 1998, in Dunedin, Florida) is an American classical pianist of Lebanese-Japanese origin. Fluent in Japanese and English, she began playing piano at age four and a half and has won many awards since then. She currently resides in Los Angeles.

== Studies ==
Currently a student of the Colburn School, Azzi studies with Fabio Bidini. She had previously been a pre-college student of The Juilliard School, studying with Yoheved Kaplinsky, and graduated high school at the Professional Performing Arts School. Azzi had studied during the summer at the Aspen Music Festival and School, Yellow Barn Young Artists Program, among others. She is on the Duke University Talent Identification Program (Duke TIP) listing for the most academically gifted students and is a member of the American Mensa. She actively promotes music through numerous outreach programs and community services both in solo and chamber music performances.

== Career ==
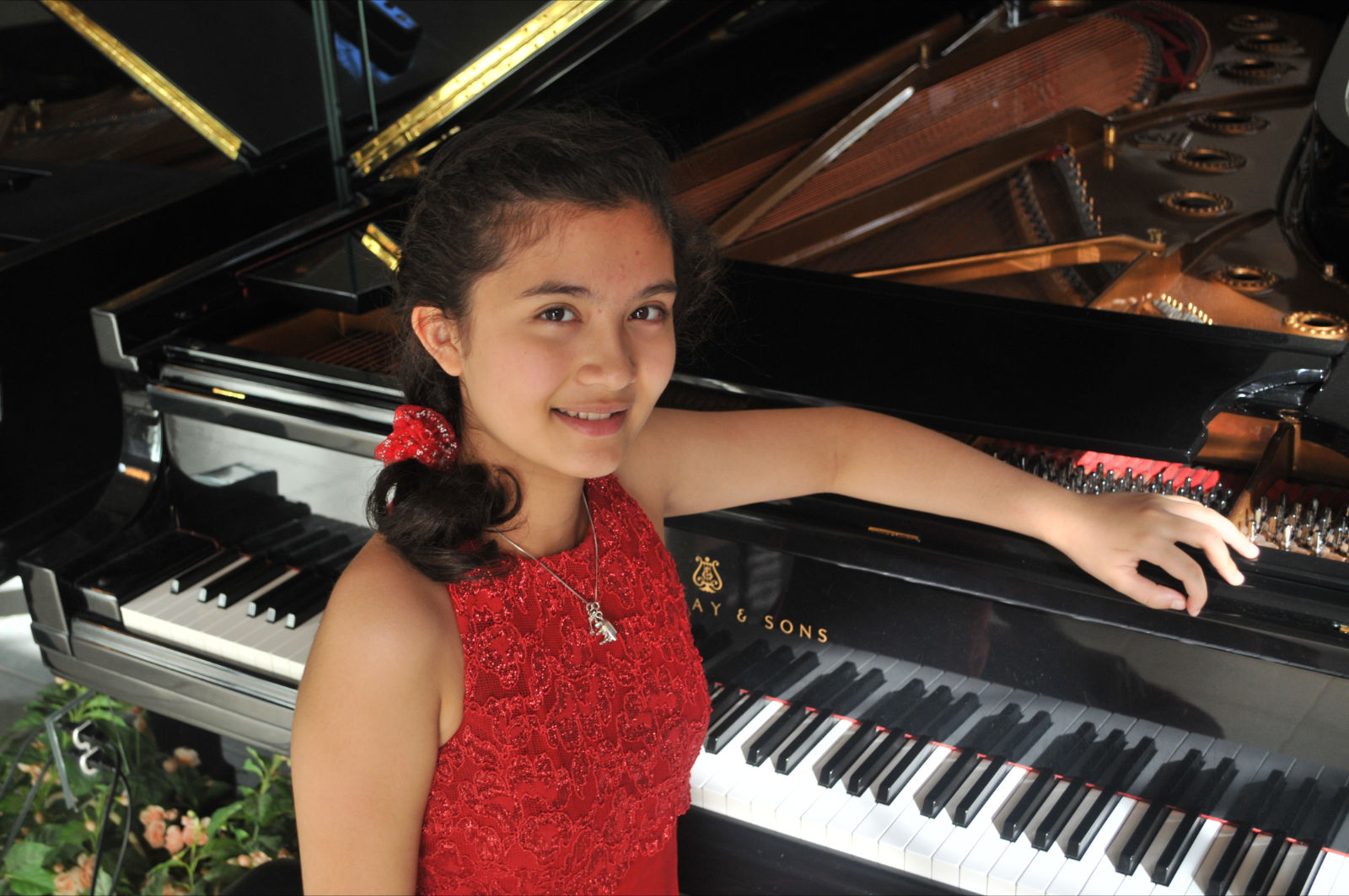
Nadia Azzi (2011)

In 2010, she made her New York City debut performing at Carnegie Hall. She later returned to Carnegie Hall for performances on two other occasions. In the summer of 2010, Azzi had her European debut at the Teatro Communale in Sterzing, Italy. She also performed in many places in Aspen, Colorado. Azzi's Canadian debut was featured on Radio Canada International. She was also featured exclusively on the "Impromptu" program on 98.7 WFMT in Chicago, Illinois, carrying classical music programming.

Her orchestral debut at the age of 12 led her to perform Beethoven's Piano Concerto No. 2 with the Boston Neapolitan Chamber Orchestra in Cambridge, MA under the baton of conductor Jon Ceander Mitchell. She has been a soloist with several other orchestras since then, including the Tampa Bay Symphony, Northwest Indiana Symphony, New Philharmonic Orchestra, and Juilliard Pre-College String Ensemble under distinguished conductors. She performed in Montreal in July 2014 at the Salle Bourgie with the Orchestre de la Francophonie under conductor Jean-Philippe Tremblay.

In 2012, she made her debut at the Newport Music Festival. Also in 2012, Azzi played on NPR's From the Top radio program. In 2013 and 2014, she performed at the Junior Piano Academy Eppan in Italy, the Bravo Niagara International Music Festival in Canada, the 15th Youth America Grand Prix Anniversary Celebration at David H. Koch Theater in Lincoln Center, Aspen Music Festival, and in Washington, D.C. by an invitation from the Florida House on Capitol Hill.

Nadia appeared on Arabs Got Talent in 2015 and got the golden buzz from MBC Group TV Director Ali Jaber, automatically qualifying her to the semi-final round. Co-host Raya Abirached dubbed her the "golden girl." Jaber told her, "Nadia, you are magnificent, you raise the name of Arabs and of Lebanon. I am so very proud of you." She placed in the top 3 in the semi-final round.

== Awards ==
- Gold Medal at the 2010 and 2012 "Passion of Music" Festival by the American Association for the Development of the Gifted and Talented (AADGT)
- Youngest winner of the 2010 Orfeo International Music Festival Competition in Italy.
- First prize in the Overall and the ART New Music Awards at the 2011 New Music National Young Artist Competition in Chicago, Illinois.
- Winner of the 2011 Tampa Bay Symphony Young Artist Competition.
- Grand Prize Winner of the 2012 Crescendo International Music Competition.
- First Prize Winner of the 2013 Bradshaw & Buono International Piano Competition
- Second Prize and Audience Prize Winner of the 2013 Thousand Islands International Chopin Piano Competition
- First Prize of the 2014 Nordmann Scholarship Competition, which gave her a full tuition merit scholarship to continue her study at Juilliard Pre-College Division
- First Prize at the Western instrument category of 2014 Sinovision Teen's Talent Show
