= Tropfest Arabia =

Short film festival

Coordinates: 24°25′46″N 54°27′20″E

Tropfest Arabia تروب فست أرابيا
- Location: Abu Dhabi, United Arab Emirates
- Language: Arabic
- Website: http://www.tropfestarabia.com/

Tropfest Arabia (Arabic: تروب فست أرابيا) is an extension of Tropfest, the world's largest short film festival. Tropfest began in 1993 as a screening for 200 people in a cafe in Sydney but has since become the largest platform for short films in the world.

Tropfest Arabia was first held in November 2011 in Abu Dhabi, the United Arab Emirates.

Tropfest Arabia covers the Middle East and North Africa (MENA) region and is open to Nationals of Algeria, Bahrain, Djibouti, Egypt, Iraq, Jordan, Kuwait, Lebanon, Libya, Morocco, Oman, Palestine, Qatar, Saudi Arabia, Sudan, Syria, Tunisia, United Arab Emirates and Yemen. The event is supported by twofour54 Abu Dhabi whose aim is to establish a sustainable Arabic media and entertainment content creation industry in the Middle East.

The second annual Tropfest Arabia film festival took place in Abu Dhabi in October 2012. A regional Tropfest Arabia workshop tour on short filmmaking kicked off in May 2012, with sessions hosted in Egypt, UAE, Oman, Saudi Arabia, Kuwait, Qatar, Jordan, Lebanon, Morocco and Iraq.

The third Tropfest Arabia film festival took place in Abu Dhabi's Cornishe on November 8. A regional Tropfest Arabia workshop tour on short filmmaking kicked off in May 2012, with sessions hosted in Egypt, UAE, Oman, Saudi Arabia, Kuwait, Qatar, Jordan, Lebanon, Morocco and Iraq.

== Tropfest Arabia 2011 ==
Tropfest Arabia 2011 Festival Night

Over 12,000 film fans from across the region attended Tropfest Arabia on Abu Dhabi's Corniche for the inaugural TROPFEST Arabia 2011 on November 4, 2011. The festival was hosted by Raya Abirached and Qusai Kheder from Arabs' Got Talent, with performances from the cast members of Star Academy Arab World season eight.

Egyptian comedian and drama actor Ahmed Helmy acted as co-director alongside Tropfest founder and director John Polson. The jury panel included UAE filmmaker Nayla Al Khaja, Saudi filmmaker and actress Ahd, Saudi director Mamdouh Salem, Lebanese director Amin Dora, Egyptian producer and scriptwriter Mohammed Hefzy, Jordanian actor Eyad Nassar and TROPFEST Australia 2011 winner Damon Gameau.

== Tropfest Arabia 2012 ==
Film enthusiasts from across the region attended the second edition of TROPFEST Arabia, which was held on Abu Dhabi's Corniche on October 26, 2012. The event was presented by festival hosts, Raya Abirached and Qusai Kheder from the hit show Arabs' Got Talent. Lebanese pop star Carole Samaha, performed some of her hit songs.

Tunisian actress Hend Sabry acted as co-director alongside TROPFEST founder, John Polson. The jury consisted of a panel of renowned Arab filmmakers including Emirati animator and Chairman of Lammtara, Mohammed Saeed Harib; Kuwaiti film producer and director, Amer Al Zuhair; Jordanian actress and producer, Saba Mubarak; Syrian actress and filmmaker, Kinda Alloush; Egyptian writer and director, Amr Salama and Lebanese musician and composer Khaled Mouzanar.

== Tropfest Arabia 2013 ==
The third annual Tropfest Arabia film festival took place in Abu Dhabi's Cornishe on November 8. The event was presented by festival host, Raya Abirached. Lebanese pop star Ramy Ayach, performed some of his hit songs. The jury consisted of a panel of Arab filmmakers including Emirati director Ali Mustafa; Kuwaiti actor, Khaled Amin; Syrian actor, Bassel Khayat; Tunisian actress, Dorra Zarrouk; and Jordanian producer Rula Nasser.

== Signature item ==
Each year, Tropfest Arabia requires that entries include a particular "Tropfest Signature Item" (TSI) or action to ensure that they are unique and are made specifically for the festival.

- 2014 - Pin
- 2013 - Time
- 2012 - The number 2
- 2011 - Star

== Winners ==
2011

- First Place - Jassem Al Jabbouri from Baghdad, Iraq won first place for his film Flock of Stars, the grand prize included US$12,500, a trip to LA to meet top film executives and a trip to Australia to be a judge at TROPFEST Australia 2012.
- Second Place - Lubna Saeed Al Amoodi from the UAE received second place for her film The Smile. She received $7,500 and an internship with MBC.
- Third Place - Ahmed Ghazal from Egypt won $5,000 and a colour grading of his short film They Say at twofour54 intaj.
- Best Actor - Awarded to Ali Salloum for the film "The Smile".
- Best Actress: Awarded to Dana Dajani for the film "At First Sight".

2012

- First Place – Mohamed Hussen Anwar from Egypt won first place for his film "Undamageable". Anwar took home the grand prize of $12,500 and a trip to Los Angeles to meet film industry professionals, courtesy of Motion Pictures Association.
- Second Place – Khaled El-Boumeshouli from Morocco won second place for his film "Two, Six". He received $7,500 and a trip to meet industry professionals at the 2013 Cannes Film Festival, courtesy of twofour54 and Variety Magazine.
- Third Place – Eslam Rasmy from Egypt won third place for his film "Bite of Bread". He received $5,000 and an internship with MBC2.
- Best Actor – Awarded to Bebars Shahawy for the film "Bite of Bread".
- Best Actress – Awarded to Diana Damrawi for the film "Black & White".

2013

- First Place – Samer Nsrallah from Syria won first place for his film "The Runner". Samer received a grand prize of $11,500 and a trip to Los Angeles to meet film industry professionals, courtesy of Motion Pictures Association and a Nikon D-SLR 7100
- Second Place – Kholoud Alnajjar from Kuwait won second place for her film The "Three Pyjamas". He received $6,500 and a trip to meet industry professionals at the 2013 Cannes Film Festival, courtesy of twofour54 and Variety Magazine, and a Nikon D-SLR 7100
- Third Place – Andria Zakria Anwer from Egypt won third place for his film "Hard Time". He received $4,000 and an internship with MBC2 and a Nikon D-SLR 7100
- Best Actor – Awarded to Elyas Rezqallah for the film "The Runner".
- Best Actress – Awarded to Tuqa Mcawi for the film "Daye".

== Entry criteria ==
Filmmakers are required to create new works for the festival which must include an item, known as the "Tropfest Signature Item" (TSI) which changes each year. The TSI was "Star" in 2011, "2" for Tropfest Arabia 2012 and "Time" for Tropfest Arabia 2013. The films must be less than 7 minutes (including titles and credits) and are premiered at the Tropfest Arabia event.
