= Symphony in A minor (Ichmouratov) =

2017 symphony by Airat Ichmouratov

Symphony in A Minor On the Ruins of an Ancient Fort
- by Airat Ichmouratov
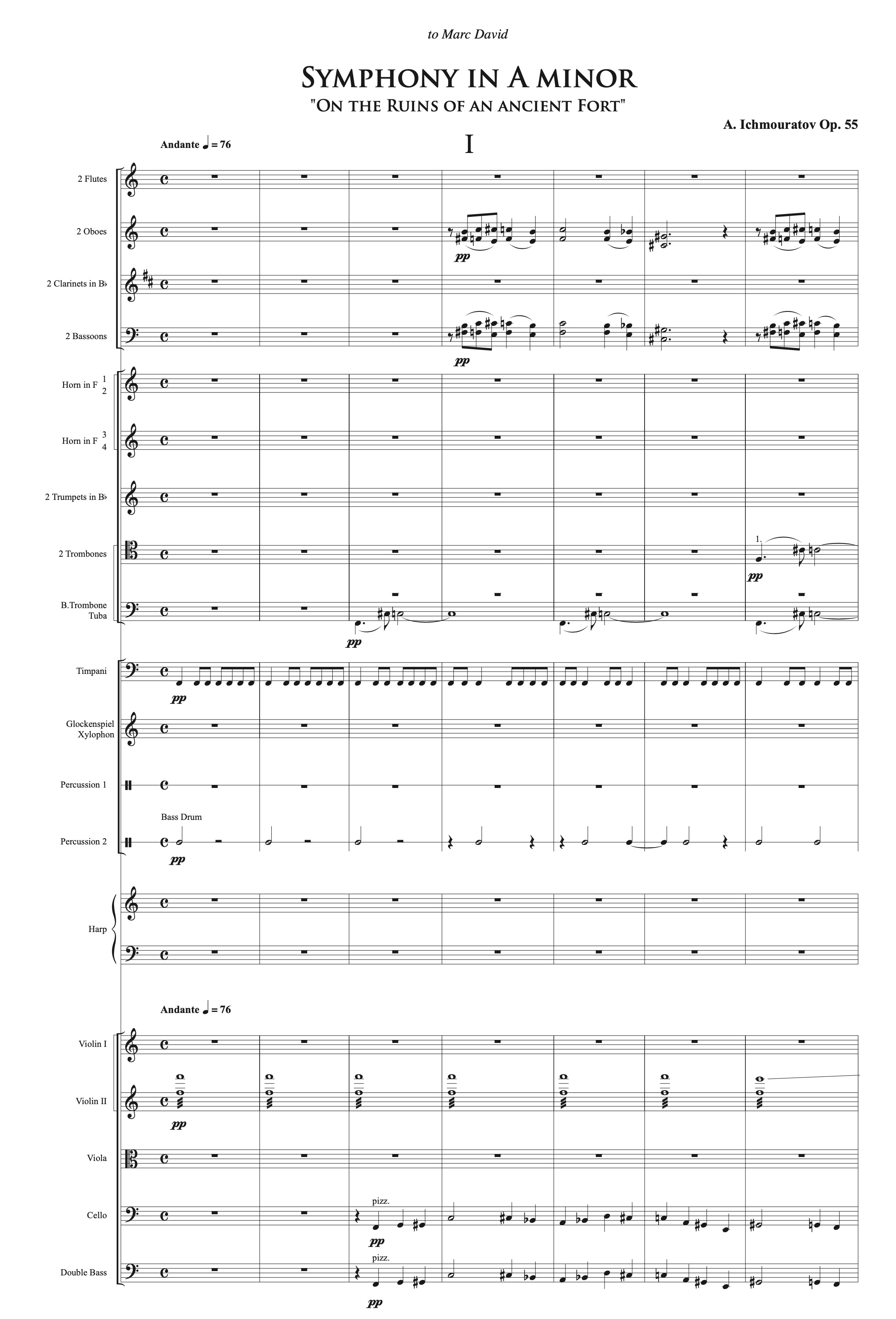
- Symphony, Op.55 'On the Ruins of an Ancient Fort' by Airat Ichmouratov (front page)
- Key: A minor
- Opus: 55
- Composed: 2016
- Dedication: Marc David
- Recorded: Chandos Records – CHAN 20172 (June 2020)
- Duration: 47 minutes
- Movements: 4

Premiere
- Date: 28 September 2018
- Location: Pratt and Whitney Canada Hall, Longueuil City
- Conductor: Mark David
- Performers: Longueuil Symphony Orchestra

The Symphony in A minor, "On the Ruins of an Ancient Fort", Op. 55, was composed by Airat Ichmouratov in 2017 with support by Longueuil Arts Council. It was premiered in Longueuil City on 28 September 2018 by Longueuil Symphony Orchestra under the baton of French-Canadian conductor Marc David. Ichmouratov's Symphony seeks to recreate the vitality of Longueuil, a city on the south shore of the St. Lawrence River, from its beginnings as an outpost of New France (only the foundations of Fort Longueuil remain) to the present day.

== Structure ==
The work has four movements. A typical performance of the symphony lasts somewhat less than 47 minutes

1. Andante – Moderato espressivo
2. Allegro scherzando
3. Largo
4. Allegro con fuoco

=== I. Andante – Moderato espressivo ===
The symphony starts with subtle strokes on the timpani and bass drum, evoking the resonance of Iroquois war drums, harkening back to a time when the collision of cultures was an impending reality; an ominous figure for solo tuba features a rising minor sixth.

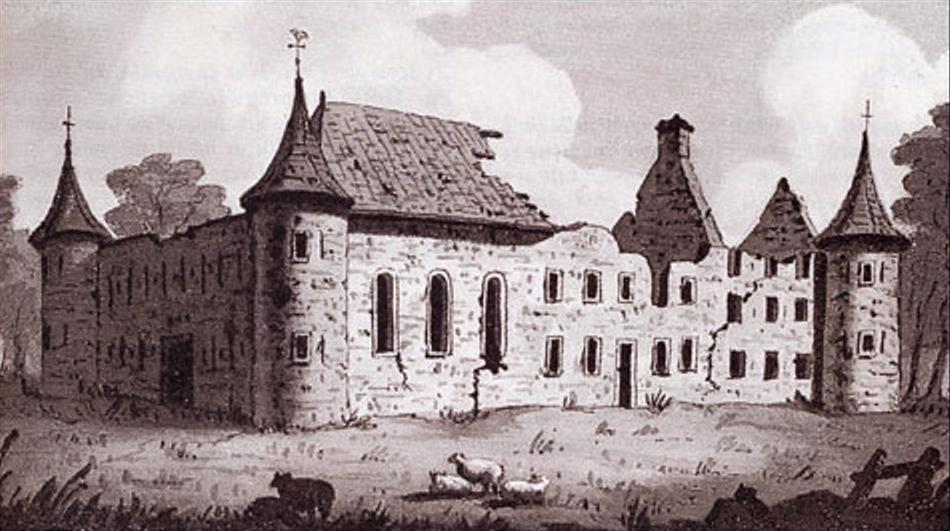
Ruins of Fort Longueuil, painting by John Poad Drake, 1825

This theme, embodied with unwavering strength, is subsequently echoed in full grandeur by the unison horns, simultaneously portraying the indomitable spirit of Charles (II) le Moyne de Longueuil, a baron bestowed with this honor by Louis XIV. The key of A minor serves as both the canvas and backdrop for this musical narrative. Amidst turbulent musical passages, a second theme emerges, introduced by a solo violin. This theme paints a human portrait of the Baron, a man known for his peacemaking abilities as much as his military prowess. The Baron was a person of European heritage who found inspiration and energy in the unique dynamism of the New World.

While the symphony does not adhere to a conventional recapitulation, key motifs reappear throughout, including a poignant return to the foreboding drumming of the opening, ultimately leading to a resolute and decisive cadence that encapsulates the essence of Longueuil's enduring spirit.

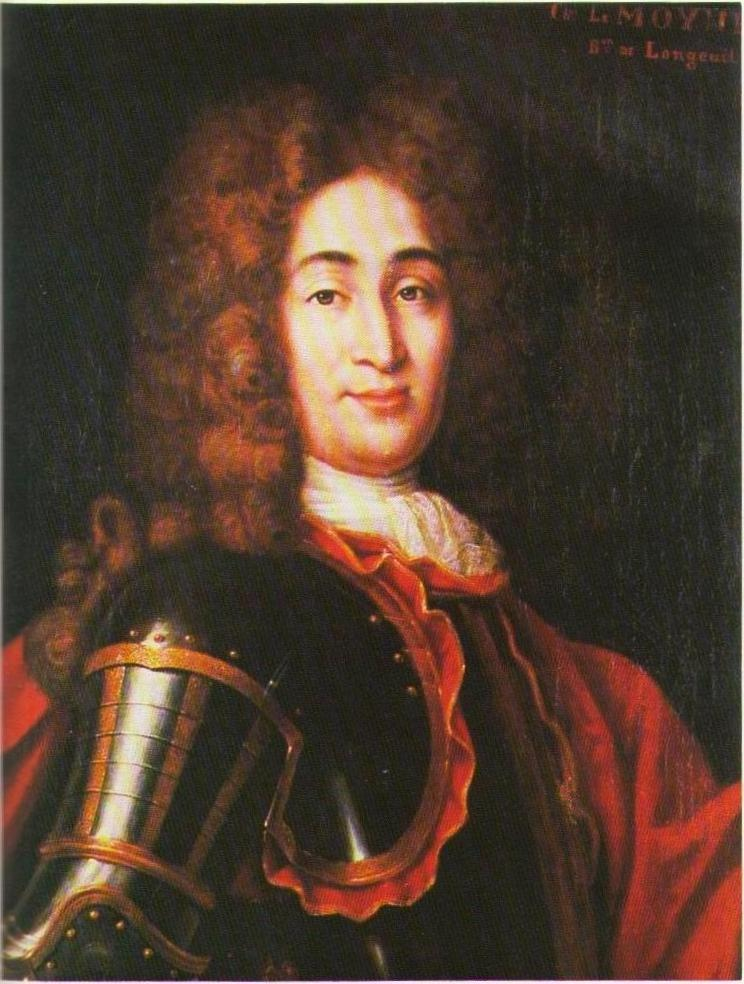
Charles le Moyne de Longueuil, Baron de Longueuil

=== II. Allegro scherzando ===
The second movement, despite maintaining a 4/4 time signature, exhibits a distinctly scherzando character. This movement serves as an auditory portrayal of the vibrant ambiance of contemporary Longueuil, a city located on the southern banks of the St. Lawrence River in Quebec, Canada.

Within this musical composition, listeners are immersed in a vivid soundscape that vividly captures the bustling and dynamic atmosphere of modern-day Longueuil. The movement paints aural images of various facets of daily life, including the cheerful sounds of children playing in local parks, the animated discourse of adults engaged in spirited debates on the city's bustling streets, the cacophonous symphony of urban traffic noises, and the resonant melodies emanating from a nightclub, often featuring the bright and spirited tones of a trumpet.

=== III. Largo ===
The Largo movement, set in the resplendent key of E major, unfolds with a sense of nostalgia rather than melancholy, setting the tone with its swelling strings. However, it doesn't take long before the composition reveals its lyrical depth through solos performed by the trumpet, flute, and clarinet.

The composer's initial inspiration for this movement was to portray the remarkable figure of Eulalie Durocher, recognized as Mother Marie-Rose Durocher, particularly in her role as the founding superior of a religious community in Longueuil, Quebec. However, the emotional depth of this composition was profoundly intensified by a tragic event – the sudden and shocking death of the composer's own mother. Like Eulalie Durocher, the composer's mother embodied qualities of compassion and fortitude, making her death a deeply personal and emotionally charged experience. While the prevailing message is of affirmation in the face of adversity, there is room for a humorous march, playfully orchestrated and always in common time.

=== IV. Allegro con fuoco ===
The finale opens, Allegro con fuoco and fortissimo, with a rising three-note motto defining a major seventh – a figure the composer regards as his personal fate motif. This musical signature, derived from a theme found in the finale of Shostakovich's Fourth Symphony, has appeared in almost every work Ichmouratov has written since 2009. Here the interval is intended also to form a heroic and ultimately celebratory bridge between the era of the Baron de Longueuil, with its warfare and hardship, and the present day. An exuberant second theme in winds evokes a jig; a more pensive section marked andante misterioso brings back the ominous theme of the opening of the symphony. Later, a solo cello with woodwind commentary restores the nostalgic mood of the slow movement. The conclusion, however, is entirely positive in character, with an exuberant use of timpani that brings to mind the close of Mahler's Seventh.

== Instrumentation ==
This symphony is scored for the following orchestra (percussion, performed by 3 players):

- 2 flutes (second doubling piccolo)
- 2 oboes
- 2 clarinets in B♭
- 2 bassoons
- 4 horns in F
- 2 trumpets in B♭
- 3 trombones: tenor, bass
- Tuba
- Timpani
- Triangle
- Cymbals
- Snare drum
- Bass drum
- Suspended cymbal
- Guiro
- Tam tam
- Tambourine
- Glockenspiel
- Xylophone
- Tubular bells
- Harp
- Strings

== Recording ==
- Chandos Records: CHAN 20172 – Ichmouratov; Overtures/Symphony; Orchestre de la Francophonie; Jean-Philippe Tremblay, conductor

== Critical reception ==
The recording of the Symphony in A minor gained negative-to-positive reviews. David Nice from BBC Music Magazine wrote: "I had to force myself to listen to the end of the A minor Symphony, more a symphonic tone-poem in four very conventional movements". Guy Rickards from Gramophone wrote: "the symphony is colourful and descriptive...Attractive if not great music"
