= Youth Overture =

2016 composition by Airat Ichmouratov

- by Airat Ichmouratov
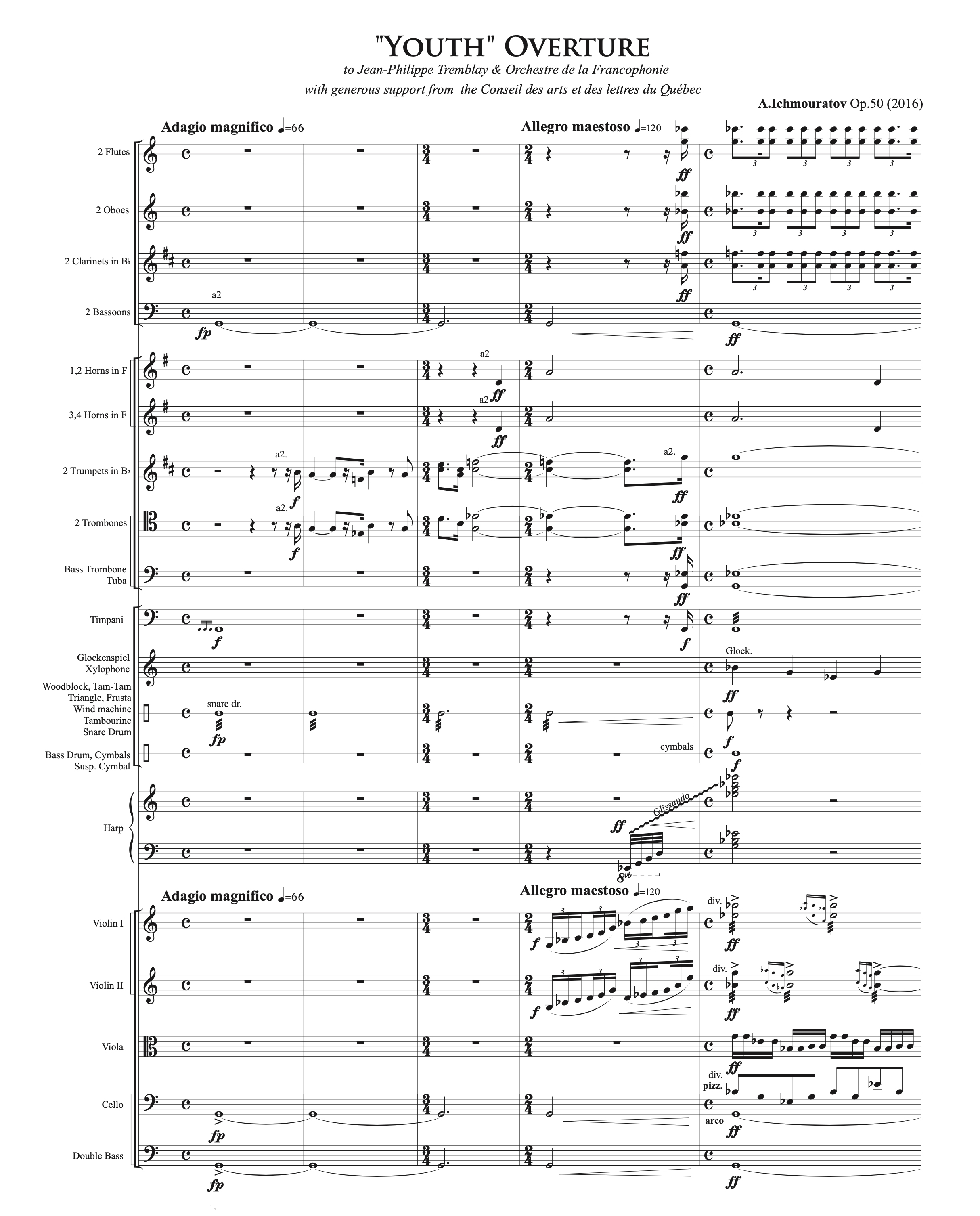
- "Youth" Overture by Airat Ichmouratov (front page)
- Key: C major
- Opus: 50
- Composed: 2015
- Dedication: Jean-Philippe Tremblay and the Orchestre de la Francophonie on the occasion of their fifteenth anniversary and to the Youth of our Planet, ambitious and fearless in making our home a better place
- Recorded: Chandos Records – CHAN 20172 (June 2020)
- Duration: 13 minutes 48 seconds

Premiere
- Date: 28 July 2016
- Location: Centre Pierre-Charbonneau
- Conductor: Jean-Philippe Tremblay
- Performers: Orchestre de la Francophonie

The Youth Overture, Op. 50, written in 2016 by Russian-Canadian composer Airat Ichmouratov with the support of the Conseil des arts et des lettres du Québec. The work was commissioned to mark the fifteenth anniversary of the Orchestre de la Francophonie and received its world premiere on July 28, 2016, at the Centre Pierre-Charbonneau in Montreal. It was premiered by the ensemble under the direction of its founder, the French-Canadian conductor Jean-Philippe Tremblay, to whom the work is dedicated, together with the orchestra and "the youth of our planet, ambitious and fearless in making our home a better place."

In August 2019, the Youth Overture was recorded in Montreal for Chandos Records label and released following year.

== Background ==
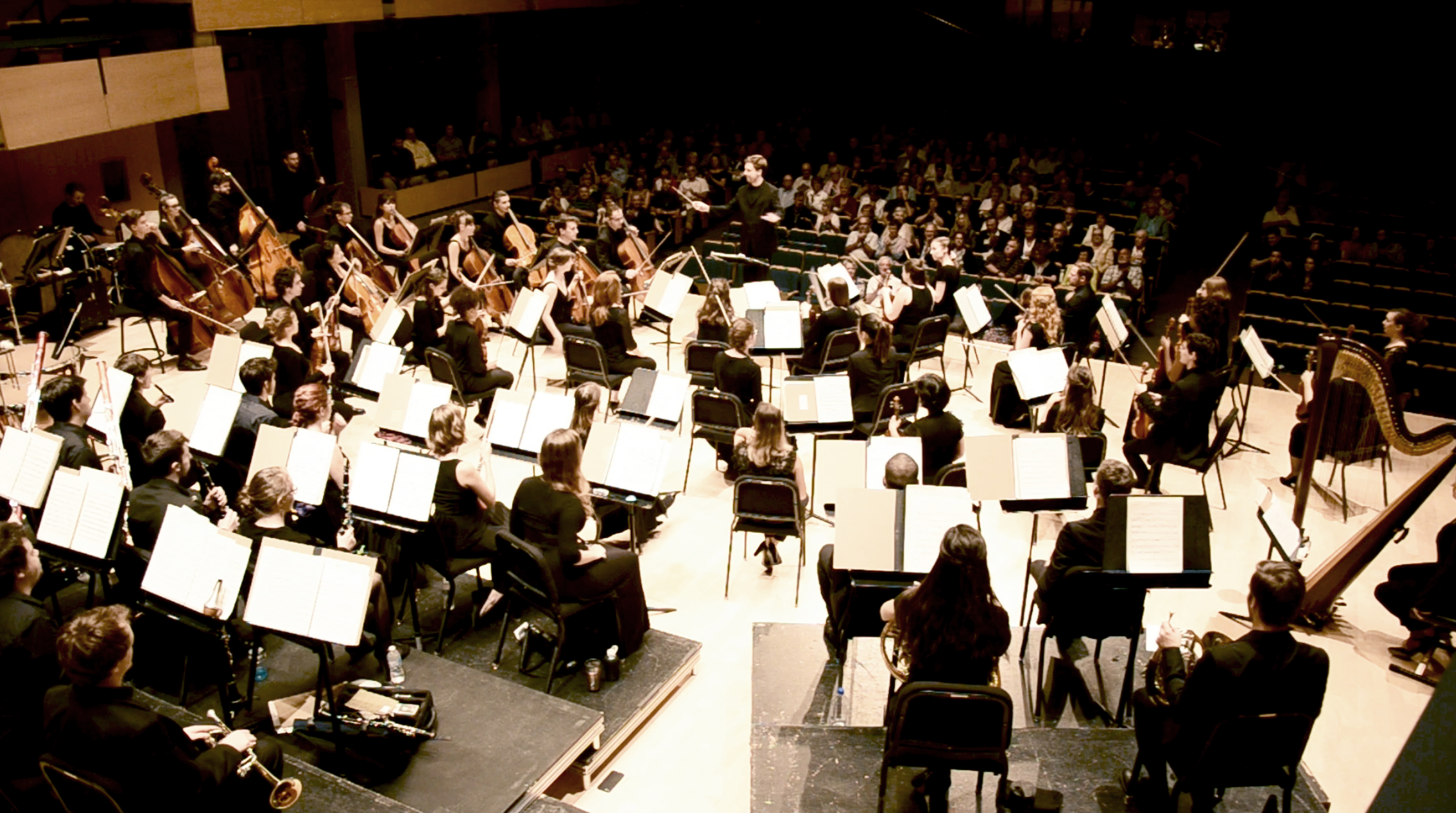
The Orchestre de la Francophonie performing Airat Ichmouratov's Youth Overture on 30 July 2016 at Domaine Forget Hall

The Orchestre de la Francophonie is a Canadian symphony orchestra based in Montreal. It was founded as a temporary ensemble for the 2001 Jeux de la Francophonie (Francophone Games) held in Canada. Following the success of the event, the orchestra became a permanent institution dedicated to the professional training and development of young musicians. Airat Ichmouratov was a member of this orchestra during its very first year and, according to his own words, wanted to create something special for the orchestra's anniversary – an overture that is very energetic and turbulent but at the same time has a nostalgic touch. He mentioned that he took his inspiration from great Russian overtures such as Borodin's Prince Igor and Glinka's Ruslan and Lyudmila.

During the composition of the work, composer also decided to dedicate this overture to the musical youth of our planet. In his Master's thesis at the University of Montreal, where he discusses his Youth Overture, he described what youth means to him:

...Youth is the most magical period in our lives. It's a time of the most important experiences, which will have an impact on our entire existence. It's a time to choose a profession; it's a time for first kisses. It's the first time in our lives when we make decisions as "grown-ups"... and for some, it's a time to choose a path to make our world a better place – a place without war, a place where we can take care of our home instead of slowly destroying it. Imagine, just imagine, that this wild and beautiful ocean is simply your life, and you are a sailboat crossing it. You are facing strong winds and brutal waves, and sometimes you fail, but you stand up again and again in order to conquer the ocean and victoriously achieve your dreams.

== Musical form ==
The work is structured in a fairly conventional sonata form and is written in C major.

The overture begins with a fanfare, composer mentions that in the opening of the overture he wanted to have a feeling of excitement, of something huge and spectacular. The main melody is given to the trumpets, trombones and horns.

Openning Fanfare, mm. 1–7

After the Maestoso opening, the orchestra gradually moves into the Allegro vivace section, where at measure 37 the clarinet introduces the overture's energetic 1st theme. The melody begins with a fanfare-like ascent through the C major triad, followed by a virtuosic passage.

1st theme, mm. 37–43

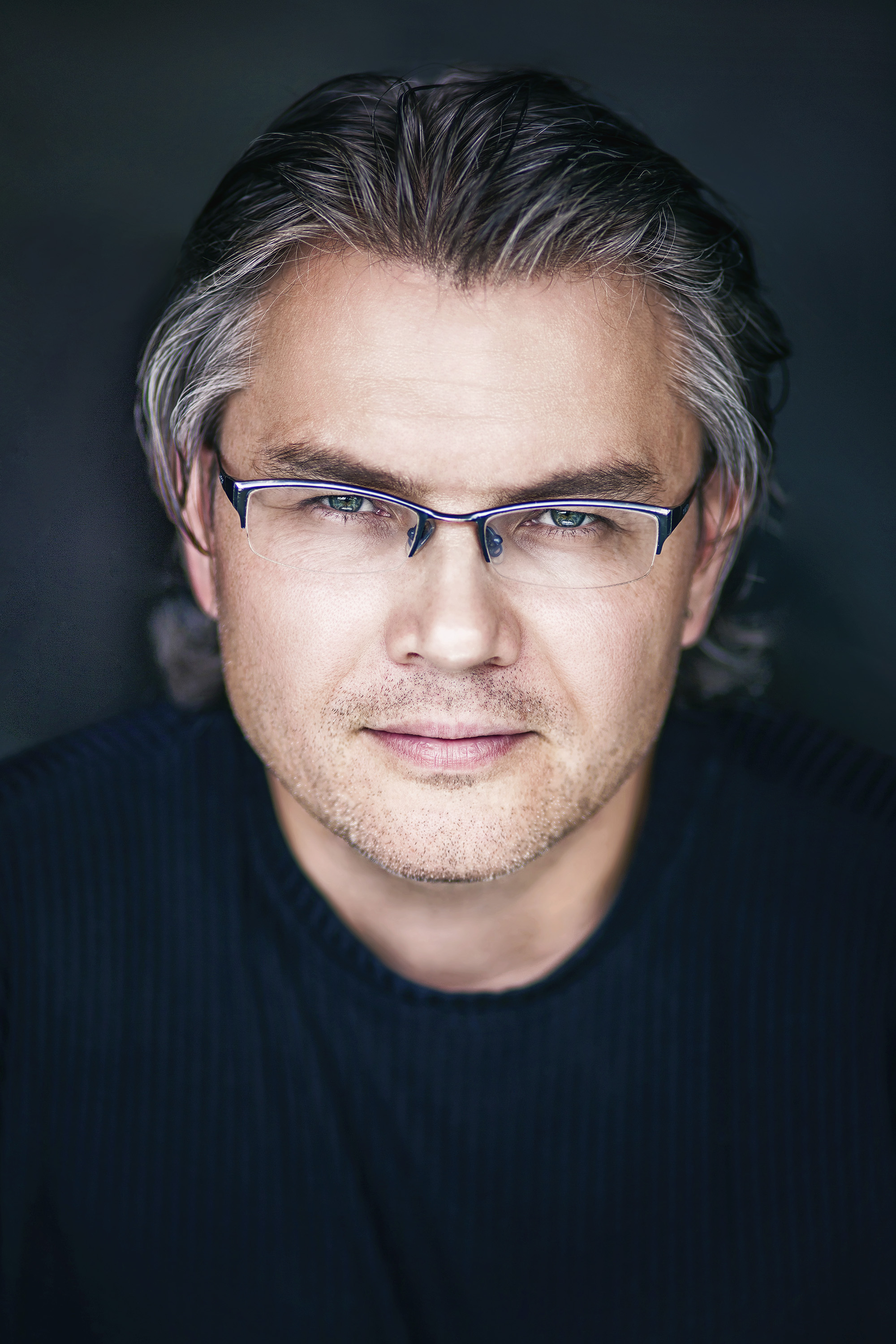
Airat Ichmouratov, circa 2016

At measures 88–89, the trumpets introduce a new theme that the composer calls the "bridge theme." This theme has a special personal meaning for him and plays an important expressive role in the work:

...at rehearsal number 5, there is a bridge theme. While I was writing this overture, I had in mind the character of youth, so I definitely wanted to add a bit of quirkiness, humor and feistiness to the music. In order to do so, in measure 88, the trumpet con sordino is playing a slightly arrogant and humorous motif as the call to the battle, with its last eighth note offbeat accentuated by the brass and lower strings' chord.

Bridge theme, mm. 88–89

The secondary theme appears at rehearsal number 7, measure 120. It is a broad, lyrical melody in G major, played in unison by the strings and supported by the horns, flutes, and oboes. The clarinets accompany it with an ostinato rhythm and arpeggiated figures. The composer describes this theme as "a typical Slavic-influenced melancholic melody."

The secondary theme, mm. 120–126

In measure 194, the wind machine appears for the first time. The composer, who compared life to the ocean, wanted to create the image of a stormy sea. He felt that the wind machine was the perfect instrument to represent the storm, with its sound suggesting wind blowing over the waves and adding a vivid image to the music.

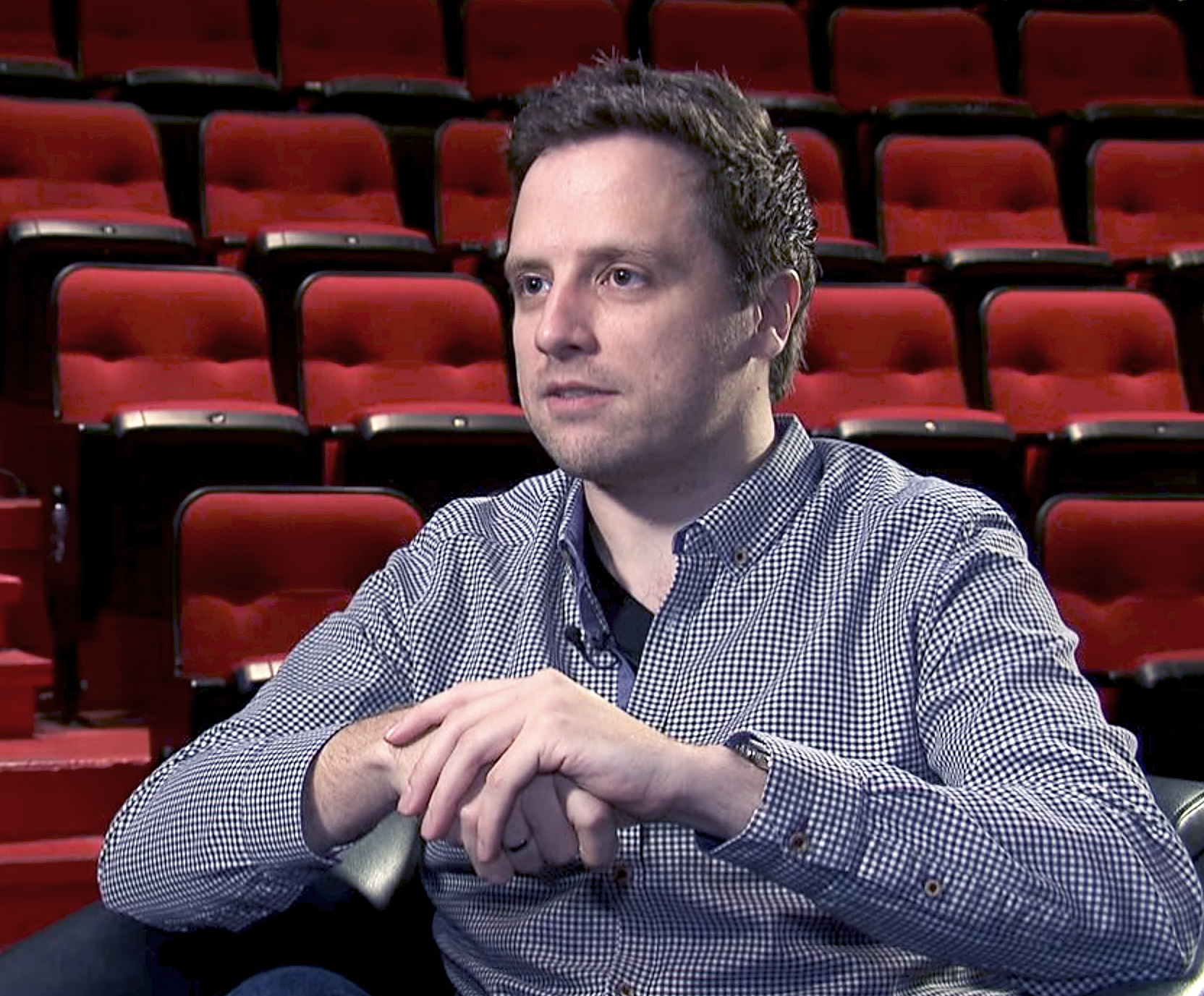
Jean-Philippe Tremblay, circa 2016, Montreal

Appearance of wind machine, mm. 194–126

At rehearsal number 16, the recapitulation begins. At measure 300 the trumpet, playing senza sordino, presents the main theme as a solo. The clarinet then completes the melody with a virtuosic passage, recalling its important role in the opening of the overture.

1st theme in recapitulation, mm. 300–3002

The overture concludes with a turbulent coda.The composer describes the coda as the image of a sailboat crossing the ocean, fighting through the waves and the power of nature:

...Number 25 portrays a sailboat crossing the ocean, fighting the waves. I wanted to create here a scene of the wild and beautiful ocean and a sailboat that crosses it, which represent someone's life and the struggles and victories of living in this tumultuous world. To make the music more evocative, I again used the wind machine combined with a flurry of passages by the woodwinds depicting turbulent wind on the ocean. This is the highest point of the overture, where the struggle comes to its apogee.

== Orchestration ==
While discussing his Youth Overture, Airat Ichmouratov expressed his admiration for the orchestration techniques of Tchaikovsky, Shostakovich, and Rachmaninov:

... The orchestration of my overture is influenced by the great Russian composers: Pyotr Tchaikovsky, Sergei Rachmaninov, and Dmitri Shostakovich. I have always been fascinated by the orchestration skills of these composers. I noticed and used the idea of Tchaikovsky, who often uses in culminations brass harmonic pedals with little rests between them. It gives more clarity to the melody and harmonic change. I like a lot when Rachmaninov uses the entire string section to play the melody in unison accompanied by winds and brass, so I decided to use a similar orchestration for the appearance of the second theme. Shostakovich's opening fanfare in his Festive Overture was a source of inspiration for orchestration for the opening and middle fanfares of my overture.

A typical performance of the overture lasts somewhat around 13 minutes. Overture is scored for the following orchestra:

- percussion, performed by 3 players
- 2 flutes
- 2 oboes
- 2 clarinets in B♭
- 2 bassoons
- 4 horns in F
- 2 trumpets in B♭
- 3 trombones: tenor, bass
- Tuba
- Timpani
- Triangle
- Cymbals
- Snare drum
- Bass drum
- Suspended cymbal
- Clapper
- Tam tam
- Tambourine
- Glockenspiel
- Xylophone
- Woodblock
- Wind machine
- Harp
- Strings

== Recording ==
External audio
- Performed by Orchestre de la Francophonie, Jean-Philippe Tremblay, conductor
- Adagio magnifico – Allegro vivace

- Chandos Records: CHAN 20172 – Ichmouratov; Overtures/Symphony; Orchestre de la Francophonie; Jean-Philippe Tremblay, conductor

== Critical reception ==
The recording of the Overture gained negative-to-positive reviews. David Nice from BBC Music Magazine wrote: "The 'Youth' Overture, once past the portentous opening, has a clarinet theme with engagingly florid turns, a creepy-weird counter-theme and a broad synthetic melody." Guy Rickards from Gramophone wrote: "The overture Youth is a light, fun concert-opener." According to Jean Lacroix of Crescendo magazine, the work features "vibrant fanfares and sustained dramatic tension", capturing the excitement and boundless energy of youth, to whom the composer dedicates this music of vitality and exuberance. Colin Clarke of Classical Explorer described the overture as "written to celebrate the optimism of the youth of its title" and remarked on its "remarkable vivacity."

== Performances ==
Since its premiere by the Orchestre de la Francophonie, the Youth Overture has been performed on several occasions by orchestras such as the Orchestre de l'Université de Montréal, the Saskatoon Symphony Orchestra, Longueuil Symphony Orchestra, Free State Symphony Orchestra.
