= America's Got Talent: The Champions season 2 =

America's Got Talent: The Champions
- Season 2
- Promotional poster for season 1, featuring (L to R) judges Mandel, Klum, Cowell, and Dixon alongside host Crews
- Showrunner: Jason Raff
- Hosted by: Terry Crews
- Judges: Simon Cowell; Heidi Klum; Alesha Dixon; Howie Mandel
- Winner: V.Unbeatable
- Runner-up: Duo Transcend
- No. of episodes: 7

Release
- Original network: NBC
- Original release: January 6 – February 17, 2020

Season chronology
- ← Previous; Season 1

The second season of America's Got Talent: The Champions featured around 40 participants from across the Got Talent franchise, ranging from winners, live round participants – quarter-finalists (where applicable), semi-finalists and finalists – and other notable acts. This season had the same host and judges, except Mel B was replaced by Alesha Dixon.

Judges and Presenter for America's Got Talent: The Champions Season 2

Simon Cowell

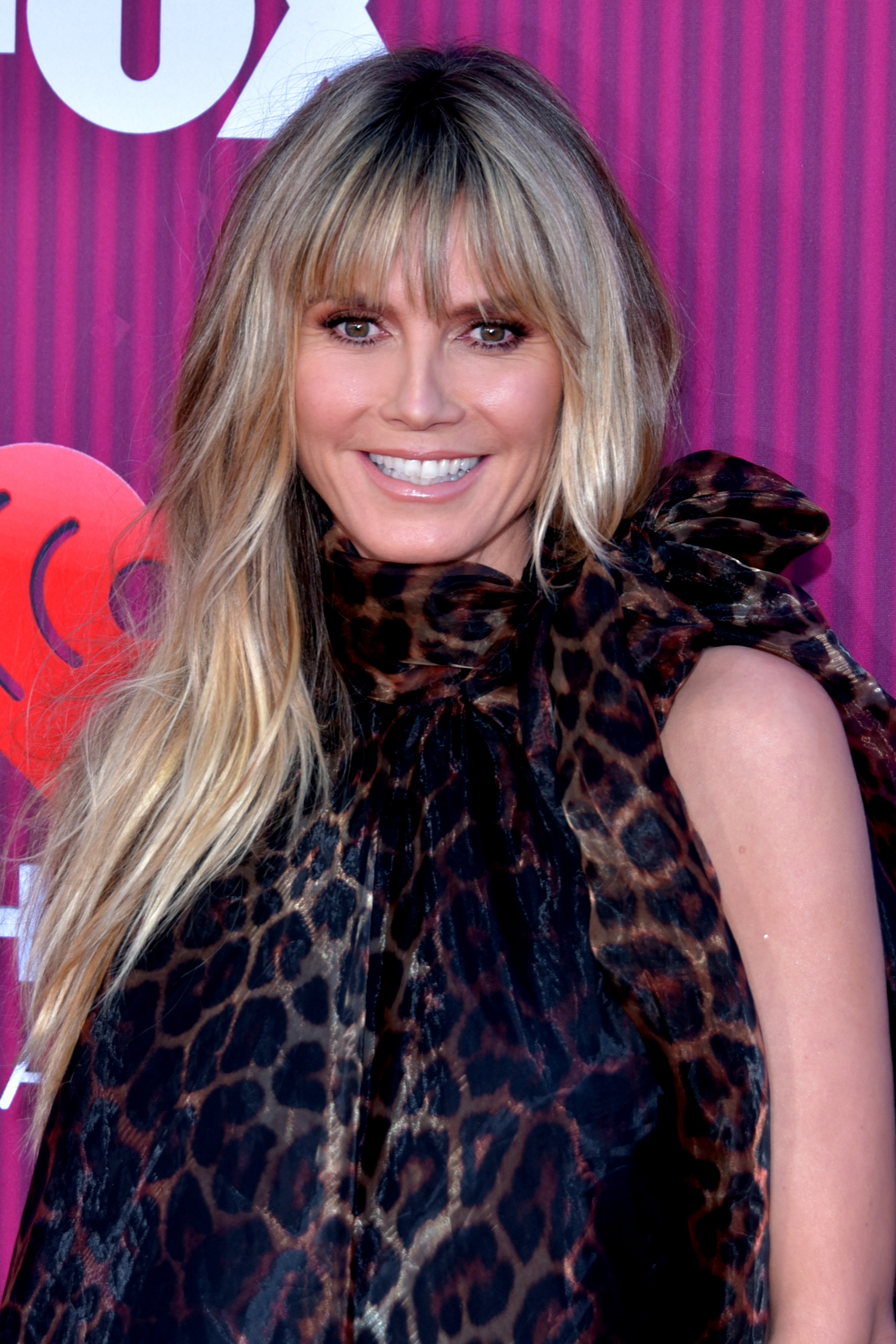
Heidi Klum

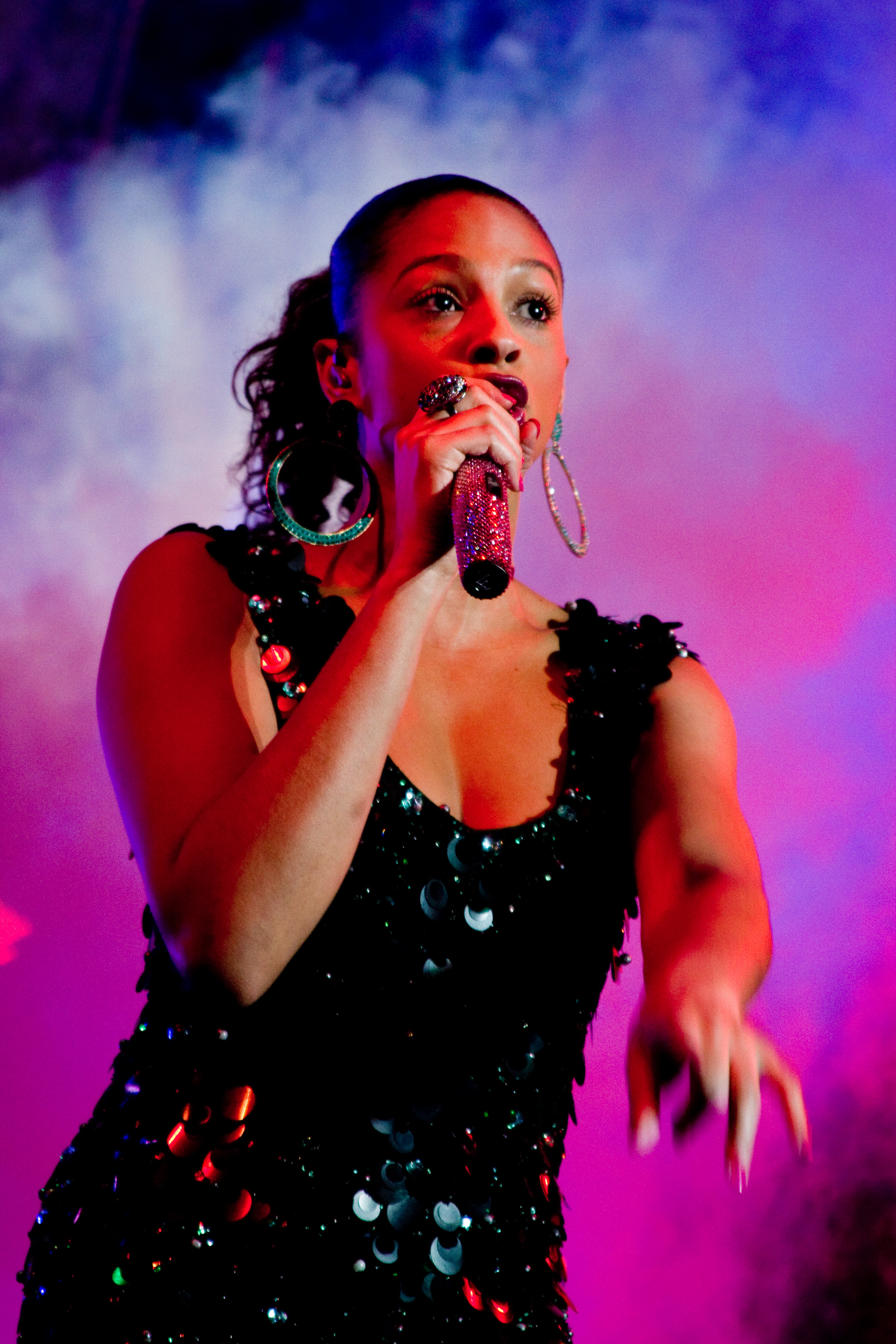
Alesha Dixon

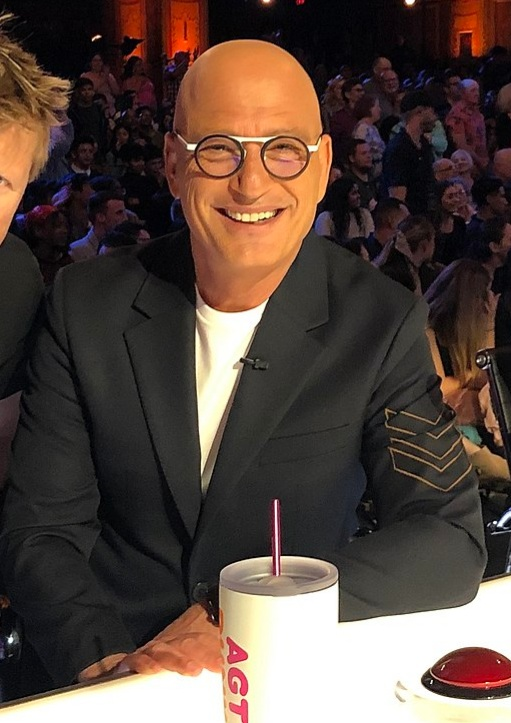
Howie Mandel

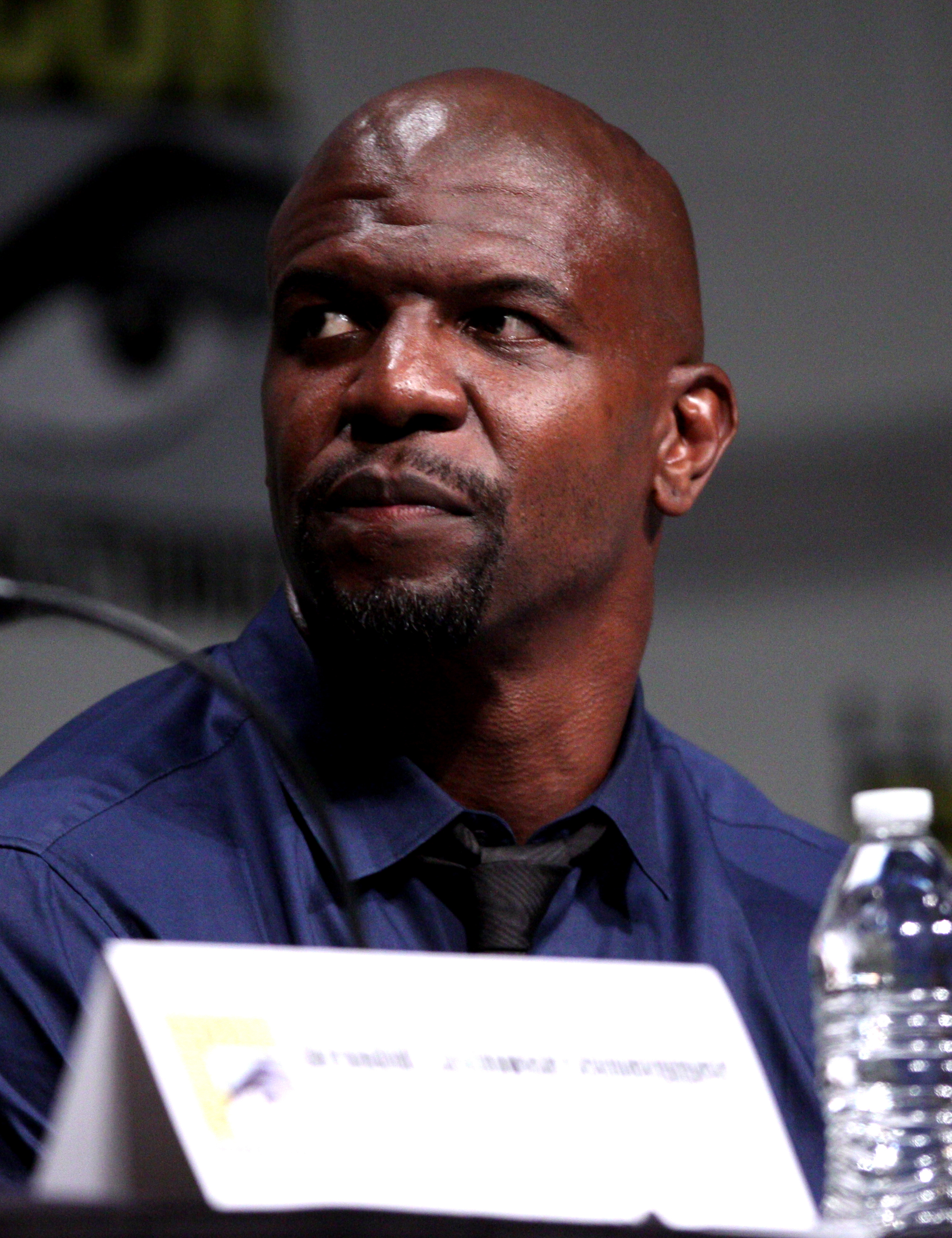
Terry Crews

== Overview ==
The contest's preliminaries featuring around 10 participants. While those receiving a golden buzzer in each preliminary would secure an automatic place in the grand-final, remaining places would be competed for in two semi-finals, each consisting of the two highest voted in each preliminary, along with a third in each voted for by the judges from amongst those placing 3rd, 4th and 5th respectively in the audience vote. The following table lists each participant that took part, and their history in the Got Talent franchise – per respective international version, season, and performance, within chronological order from first to more recent appearance:

Got Talent History Key	AGT — America's Got Talent	AIT — L'Afrique a un Incroyable Talent	AuGT — Australia's Got Talent	BGTC — Britain's Got Talent: The Champions
Got Talent History Key	BGT — Britain's Got Talent	DS — Das Supertalent	FIT — La France a un incroyable talent	GTE — Got Talent España
Got Talent History Key	HGT — Holland's Got Talent	IGT — Italia's Got Talent	MS — Minuta slavy	MGT — Myanmar's Got Talent
Got Talent History Key	MT — Mam talent!	NT — Norske Talenter	PGT — Pilipinas Got Talent	RT — Românii au talent

Winner | Runner-up | Third place | Finalist | Semi-Finalist
Eliminated | Golden Buzzer Finalist

Participant	Act	Got Talent history	Preliminary	Results
Alexa Lauenburger	Dog Act	DS: S11 – Winner; BGTC: S1 – Finalist	3	Finalist
Angelina Jordan	Singer	NT: S6 – Winner	1	Finalist
Bars and Melody	Rapper & Singer	BGT: S8 – 3rd Place ; BGTC: S1 – Finalist	4	Eliminated
Ben Blaque	Crossbow Performer	AGT: S7 – Quarter-Finalist; BGT: S10 – Semi-Finalist	2	Eliminated
Ben Hart	Magician	BGT: S13 – 3rd Place; BGTC: S1 – Participant	3	Eliminated
Boogie Storm	Dance Group	BGT: S10 – Third Place; BGTC: S1 – Participant	2	Finalist
Brian King Joseph	Violinist	AGT: S13 – Third Place	4	Eliminated
Christian Stoinev & Percy	Hand Balancer & Dog Act	AGT: S2 – Participant, S9 – Top 12 Finalist; DS: S13 – Winner	4	Eliminated
Collabro	Musical Theatre Vocal Group	BGT: S8 – Winner; BGTC: S1 – Participant	2	Eliminated
Connie Talbot	Singer	BGT: S1 – Finalist; BGTC: S1 – Participant	4	Eliminated
Dan Naturman	Comedian	AGT: S9 – Semi-finalist	1	Eliminated
Dania Diaz	Magician	GTE: S3 – Finalist	1	Semi-finalist
Duo Destiny	Acrobatic Duo	MT: S11 – Winner	3	Semi-finalist
Duo Transcend	Trapeze Duo	AGT: S13 – Finalist	1	Runner-up
Eddie Williams	Singer	AuGT: S9 – Semi-Finalist	1	Eliminated
Emil Rengle	Dancer	RT: S8 – Winner	4	Eliminated
Freckled Sky	Video Projection Dance Duo	AGT: S10 – Quarter-finalist	3	Eliminated
Hans	Singer, Accordionist & Dancer	AGT: S13 – Quarter-finalist	1	Finalist
Jack Vidgen	Singer	AuGT: S5 – Winner	1	Eliminated
JJ Pantano	Comedian	AuGT: S9 – Semi-Finalist	4	Semi-finalist
Junior Creative Dance	Shadow Dance Group	MGT: S5 – Winner	1	Eliminated
Luke Islam	Singer	AGT: S14 – Semi-finalist	2	Eliminated
Marc Spelmann/X	Magician & Mentalist	BGT: S12 – Semi-finalist, S13 (as X) – Runner-up	2	Semi-finalist
Marcelito Pomoy	Falsetto Singer	PGT: S2 – Winner	2	Grand-finalist
Michael Grimm	Singer	AGT: S5 – Winner	3	Eliminated
Mike Yung	Singer	AGT: S12 – Semi-finalist	1	Eliminated
Miki Dark	Magician	HGT: S10 – Semi-finalist; FIT: S14 – Participant	3	Eliminated
Moses Concas	Harmonica Player	IGT: S7 – Winner	3	Eliminated
Oz Pearlman	Mentalist	AGT: S10 – Third Place	2	Eliminated
Paddy & Nico	Salsa Dance Duo	BGT: S8 – Finalist; FIT: S11 – Semi-finalist; BGTC: S1 – Finalist	1	Eliminated
Puddles Pity Party	Singer	AGT: S12 – Quarter-finalist	2	Eliminated
Quick Style	Dance Group	NT: S2 – Winner	3	Eliminated
Ryan Niemiller	Comedian	AGT: S14 – Third Place	2	Semi-finalist
Sandou Trio Russian Bar	Russian Bar Trio	AGT: S6 – Semi-finalist	4	Grand-finalist
Silhouettes	Silhouette Dance Group	AGT: S6 – Runner-up	4	Finalist
Spencer Horsman	Escape Artist	AGT: S7 – Quarter-finalist; FIT: S9 – Semi-finalist	2	Eliminated
Strauss Serpent	Contortionist	AIT: S2 – Winner; FIT: S13 – Finalist	4	Semi-finalist
Tyler Butler-Figueroa	Violinist	AGT: S14 – Finalist	3	Third place
V.Unbeatable	Acrobatic Dance Group	AGT: S14 – Grand-finalist	3	Winner
Voices of Service	Vocal Group	AGT: S14 – Grand-finalist	4	Eliminated

=== Preliminaries Summary ===
Golden Buzzer Advancement | Semi-final Advancement – Superfan Vote | Semi-final Advancement – Judges' Vote
Eliminated – Judges Vote | Eliminated | Buzzed out | Judges' choice

==== Preliminary 1 (January 6) ====
Participant	Order	Buzzes and Judges' votes				Result
Participant	Order	Cowell	Klum	Dixon	Mandel	Result
Paddy & Nico	1					Eliminated
Mike Yung	2					Eliminated
Junior Creative Dance	3					Eliminated (Lost Judge's Vote)
Hans	4					Advanced (Won Judge's Vote)
Jack Vidgen	5					Eliminated (Lost Judge's Vote)
Duo Transcend	6					Advanced (Won Superfan Vote)
Dan Naturman	7					Eliminated
Angelina Jordan	8					Grand-Final Advancement
Eddie Williams	9					Eliminated
Dania Diaz	10					Advanced (Won Superfan Vote)

==== Preliminary 2 (January 13) ====
Participant	Order	Buzzes and Judges' votes				Result
Participant	Order	Cowell	Klum	Dixon	Mandel	Result
Marcelito Pomoy	1					Advanced (Won Superfan Vote)
Oz Pearlman	2					Eliminated
Boogie Storm	3					Grand-Final Advancement
Ben Blaque^{1}	4					Eliminated
Collabro	5					Eliminated
Ryan Niemiller	6				^{2}	Advanced (Won Judge's Vote)
Puddles Pity Party	7					Eliminated
Marc Spelmann/X^{3}	8					Advanced (Won Superfan Vote)
Luke Islam	9					Eliminated (Lost Judge's Vote)
Spencer Horsman^{4}	10					Eliminated (Lost Judge's Vote)

- ^1 Ben Blaque's performance was terminated mid-way into his routine, due to an overwhelming concern from the judges it was too life-threatening to continue.
- ^2 Mandel did not cast his vote, due to the majority support for Ryan Niemiller from the other judges, but noted his vote would have made it unanimous.
- ^3 Shin Lim, a noted participant in the Got Talent franchise, made a special appearance as part of Marc Spelmann's performance.
- ^4 For health and safety reasons, Spencer Horsman's performance had to be conducted outside the venue and with paramedics on standby; both the audience and judges were in attendance for this.

==== Preliminary 3 (January 20) ====
Participant	Order	Buzzes and Judges' votes				Result
Participant	Order	Cowell	Klum	Dixon	Mandel	Result
Alexa Lauenburger	1		^{5}			Advanced (Won Judge's Vote)
Tyler Butler-Figueroa	2					Advanced (Won Superfan Vote)
Ben Hart	3					Eliminated
Freckled Sky	4					Eliminated
Moses Concas	5					Eliminated
V.Unbeatable	6					Grand-Final Advancement
Michael Grimm	7		^{5}			Eliminated (Lost Judge's Vote)
Duo Destiny	8					Advanced (Won Superfan Vote)
Quick Style	9		^{5}			Eliminated (Lost Judge's Vote)
Miki Dark	10					Eliminated

- ^5 Due to the majority vote for Alexa Lauenburger, Klum's voting intention was not disclosed.

==== Preliminary 4 (January 27) ====
Participant	Order	Buzzes and Judges' votes				Result
Participant	Order	Cowell	Klum	Dixon	Mandel	Result
Christian Stoinev & Percy	1					Eliminated (Lost Judge's Vote)
Voices of Service	2					Eliminated
JJ Pantano	3					Advanced (Won Judge's Vote)
Emil Rengle	4					Eliminated
Silhouettes	5					Grand-Final Advancement
Brian King Joseph	6					Eliminated (Lost Judge's Vote)
Connie Talbot	7					Eliminated
Sandou Trio Russian Bar	8					Advanced (Won Superfan Vote)
Bars and Melody	9					Eliminated
Strauss Serpent	10					Advanced (Won Superfan Vote)

=== Semi-finals (February 3) ===
Grand-finalist Advancement – Superfan Vote | Grand-finalist Advancement – Judges' Vote
Eliminated – Judges Vote | Eliminated | Buzzed out | Judges' choice

Participant	Order	Buzzes and Judges' votes				Result
Participant	Order	Cowell	Klum	Dixon	Mandel	Result
JJ Pantano	1					Eliminated
Tyler Butler-Figueroa	2					Advanced (Won Superfan Vote)
Marc Spelmann/X	3					Eliminated
Duo Destiny	4				^{6}	Eliminated (Lost Judge's Vote)
Hans	5					Advanced (Won Superfan Vote)
Dania Diaz	6					Eliminated
Duo Transcend	7				^{6}	Advanced (Won Judges' Vote)
Strauss Serpent	8					Eliminated
Ryan Niemiller	9					Eliminated
Alexa Lauenburger	10					Advanced (Won Superfan Vote)
Sandou Trio Russian Bar	11					Advanced (Won Superfan Vote)
Marcelito Pomoy	12					Advanced (Won Superfan Vote)

- ^6 Due to the majority vote for Duo Transcend, Mandel's voting intention was not disclosed.

=== Finals (February 10) ===
Winner | Runner-up | 3rd place

Guest Performers: Kiss, Kseniya Simonova, Lindsey Stirling, Shin Lim, Colin Cloud, Kodi Lee, Travis Barker

Finalist	Order	Act	Result (February 17)
Alexa Lauenburger	1	Dog Act	Top 10 Finalist
Duo Transcend	2	Trapeze Duo	2nd
Angelina Jordan	3	Singer	Top 10 Finalist
Boogie Storm	4	Dance Group	Top 10 Finalist
Silhouettes	5	Silhouette Dance Group	Top 10 Finalist
Hans	6	Singer, Accordionist & Dancer	Top 10 Finalist
Tyler Butler-Figueroa	7	Violinist	3rd
V.Unbeatable	8	Acrobatic Dance Group	1st
Marcelito Pomoy	9	Falsetto Singer	4th
Sandou Trio Russian Bar	10	Russian Bar Trio	5th

== Ratings ==
Episode	Title	First air date	Rating (18–49)	Share (18–49)	Viewers (millions)	Nightly Rank
1	The Champions One	January 6, 2020	1.3	6	8.06	2
2	The Champions Two	January 13, 2020	1.0	4	6.52	2
3	The Champions Three	January 20, 2020	1.1	5	7.05	2
4	The Champions Four	January 27, 2020	1.1	5	7.35	2
5	The Champions Semifinals	February 3, 2020	1.1	5	6.73	3
6	The Champions Finals	February 10, 2020	1.0	5	7.16	2
7	The Champions Results Finale	February 17, 2020	1.2	5	7.16	3
