= La mamma morta =

Aria from Andrea Chénier by Umberto Giordano

"La mamma morta" (The dead mother) is a soprano aria from act 3 of the 1896 opera Andrea Chénier by Umberto Giordano. It is sung by the character Maddalena di Coigny to Gérard about how her mother died protecting her during the turmoils of the French Revolution.

It was recorded in 1954 by Maria Callas. This version used in the soundtrack to 1993 drama film Philadelphia. Subsequent notable recordings include Anna Netrebko in 2016.

It was performed by ten-year old opera singer Emanne Beasha on the 2019 final of televised American talent show America's Got Talent season 14.

== Libretto ==
La mamma morta m'hanno
alla porta della stanza mia
Moriva e mi salvava!
poi a notte alta
io con Bersi errava,
quando ad un tratto
un livido bagliore guizza
e rischiara innanzi a' passi miei
la cupa via!
Guardo!
Bruciava il loco di mia culla!
Così fui sola!
E intorno il nulla!
Fame e miseria!
Il bisogno, il periglio!
Caddi malata,
e Bersi, buona e pura,
di sua bellezza ha fatto un mercato,
un contratto per me!
Porto sventura a chi bene mi vuole!
Fu in quel dolore
che a me venne l'amor!
Voce piena d'armonia e dice
Vivi ancora! Io son la vita!
Ne' miei occhi è il tuo cielo!
Tu non sei sola!
Le lacrime tue io le raccolgo!
Io sto sul tuo cammino e ti sorreggo!
Sorridi e spera! Io son l'amore!
Tutto intorno è sangue e fango?
Io son divino! Io son l'oblio!
Io sono il dio che sovra il mondo
scendo da l'empireo, fa della terra
un ciel! Ah!
Io son l'amore, io son l'amor, l'amor
E l'angelo si accosta, bacia,
e vi bacia la morte!
Corpo di moribonda è il corpo mio.
Prendilo dunque.
Io son già morta cosa

They killed my mother
at the door of my room
She died and saved me.
Later, at dead of night,
I wandered with Bersi,
when suddenly
a bright glow flickers
and lights were ahead of me
the dark street!
I looked –
My childhood home was on fire!
I was alone!
surrounded by nothingness!
Hunger and misery
deprivation, danger!
I fell ill,
and Bersi, so good and pure
made a market, a deal, of her beauty
for me –
I bring misfortune to all who care for me!
It was then, in my grief,
that love came to me.
A voice full of harmony says,
"Keep on living, I am life itself!
Your heaven is in my eyes!
You are not alone.
I collect all your tears
I walk with you and support you!
Smile and hope! I am Love!
Are you surrounded by blood and mire?
I am Divine! I am oblivion!
I am the God above the world
I descend from the empyrean and make this Earth
A heaven! Ah!
I am love, love, love."
And the angel approaches with a kiss,
and he kisses death –
A dying body is my body.
So take it.
I am already dead!
