= V.Unbeatable =

Mumbai-based dance group

- Years active: 2017-present
- Career
- Dances: Hip-hop dance, Acrobatic dance
- Website: vunbeatable.com

V. Unbeatable (also known as Vikas Unbeatable) is a Mumbai-based dance crew. They rose to fame in India when they took part in the dance series Dance Plus for season 4 in 2018 and finished in the top 4. They received international coverage when they took part in season 14 of America's Got Talent and received a Golden Buzzer from basketball player and guest judge Dwyane Wade.

In February 2020, they won season 2 of America's Got Talent: The Champions.

== Background ==
The V in the name stands for Vikas, after a former crew member, Vikas Gupta, who died performing stunts during a rehearsal. In 2018, they competed on the Indian dance competition Dance Plus season 4 in Team Dharmesh Yelande and finished in 4th place. Prior to this they had taken part in a reality show called India Banega Manch.

=== America's Got Talent ===
On America's Got Talent in 2019, V. Unbeatable's Judge Cuts performance consisted of an acrobatic dance routine in tribute to their fallen founder, which included flipping members over the judges' table and into chairs held high above them. Howie Mandel, Gabrielle Union, Julianne Hough, Simon Cowell, and guest judge Dwyane Wade all gave them standing ovations. Impressed with their performance, Wade hit the Golden Buzzer, sending V. Unbeatable directly to the quarterfinals. They made it past the semifinals and performed in the finals. In the end, they took 4th place in the 2019 AGT.

=== America's Got Talent: The Champions ===
V. Unbeatable returned to America's Got Talent: The Champions in 2020 (the second season of the show) after coming 4th in America's Got Talent. After their first performance, they received a golden buzzer from judge Howie Mandel, sending the dance group straight to the finals along with three other contestants. After a stunning performance in the finals and a performance with Travis Barker in the results episode they proceeded to make the Top 5. After announcing the 5th, 4th and 3rd place acts they announced the winner. In the end they won the competition receiving the title of "World Champion", a cash prize and the grand champions trophy.

=== America's Got Talent: Fantasy League ===
In 2024, V.Unbeatable was announced to be taking part in another AGT spinoff, America's Got Talent: Fantasy League on Howie Mandel's team. During the semi-final episode on February 5, 2024, they received the golden buzzer from Heidi Klum sending them to the finals on her team. They finished in third place.

== Television ==
Year	Network	Show	Role
2017	Colors TV	India Banega Manch	Contestants
2019	Star Plus	Dance Plus 4	4th Place
2019	NBC	America's Got Talent (season 14)	Finalist; Top 5; 4th place
2020	NBC	America's Got Talent: The Champions	Winner
2020	Star Plus	Dance Plus 5	Guest
2021	Star Plus	Dance Plus 6	Guest
2024	NBC	America's Got Talent: Fantasy League	Finalist; Top 5; 3rd place
