= Hip Hop Na =

Hip Hop Na, literally meaning "Our Hip Hop" in Arabic, is a hip hop talent-hunting programme that aired on MTV Arabia in 2007. It was hosted by Fredwreck Nassar & Qusai Kheder. The show held auditions in various countries in the Middle East with the grand finale held in Dubai.
