= Dance Plus season 4 =

Dance Plus
- Season 4
- Hosted by: Raghav Juyal
- Judges: Remo D'Souza
- Coaches: Dharmesh Yelande; Shakti Mohan; Punit Pathak
- No. of contestants: 12+1
- Winner: Chetan Salunkhe
- Winning mentor: Punit Pathak
- Runners-up: Sujan and Aaanchel

Release
- Original network: Star Plus
- Original release: 6 October 2018 – 2 February 2019

Season chronology
- ← Previous; Season 3 Next → Season 5

Season 4 of Dance Plus premiered on 6 October 2018 on Star Plus and is produced by Urban Brew Studios in association with Frames Productions. The season is hosted by Raghav Juyal and Sugandha Mishra. The tag line for this season is ‘Sapne Sirf Apne Nahi Hote’.

== Super judge ==
Remo D'Souza is the super judge of the season.

== Captains ==
The following are the three captains of the season.

- Shakti Mohan
- Punit Pathak
- Dharmesh Yelande

== Format ==
The fourth round is the international squad challenge in which one member of each team has to match the level of dancing of the international dancer. The artist which matches the score gets double the points of the international squad. This round is also scored out of ten by the super judge.

Based on the scores of these rounds, two teams go to the final showdown. The fourth artist from each team performs and the super judge chooses the winner. The winning team's captain nominates two artists from his or her team to go forward and the super judge chooses the artist who will go to top eight.

== Top 12 ==
Team Dharmesh Yelande
Sr.	Artists	Type	Style	Home Town
1	D Core	Group	Contemporary	Delhi
2	Gang 13	Group	Urban Choreography	Mumbai
3	V Unbeatable	Group	Hip-Hop	Bhayandar
4	Vartika Jha	Solo	Popping and Hip-Hop	Sonbhadra

Team Shakti Mohan
Sr.	Artists	Type	Style	Home Town
1	BAD Contemp	Duo	Contemporary	Kolkata
2	The Veterans	Group	Hip-Hop	Mumbai
3	Rishabh Sharma	Solo	Popping	Lucknow
4	B-Unique	Group	Animation	Jodhpur

Team Punit Pathak
Sr.	Artists	Type	Style	Home Town
1	House of Moves	Group	South Indian Street Dance and Hip-Hop	Chennai
2	Sujan and Aaanchel	Duo	Contemporary	Kathmandu and Jorhat
3	Feel Crew	Group	Lyrical	Thane
4	Chetan Salunkhe	Solo	Popping	Pune

Only exception to Top 12 is S-Unity Crew of "Team Raghav Juyal".

Captain Raghav Juyal
Sr.	Artist	Type	Style	Home Town
1	S Unity Crew	Group	Hip-Hop	Mumbai

== Top 10 ==
Now, after the super judge, Remo D'Souza, has accepted S-Unity Crew as a qualified contestant, they are taking part in the competition as a part of Team Dharmesh.

Sr.	Artists	Type	Style	Home town	Team
1.	Rishabh Sharma	Solo	Popping	Lucknow	Shakti Mohan
2.	Sujan & Aaanchel	Duo	Contemporary	Kathmandu and Jorhat	Punit Pathak
3.	V Unbeatable	Group	Hip-Hop	Bhayandar	Dharmesh Yelande
4.	Vartika Jha	Solo	Popping & Hip-Hop	Sonbhadra	Dharmesh Yelande
5.	Gang 13	Group	Urban Choreography	Mumbai	Dharmesh Yelande
6.	B-Unique	Group	Animation	Jodhpur	Shakti Mohan
7.	Chetan Salunkhe	Solo	Popping	Pune	Punit Pathak
8.	Feel Crew	Group	Lyrical	Thane	Punit Pathak
9.	The Veterans	Group	Hip-Hop	Mumbai	Shakti Mohan
10.	S Unity Crew	Group	Hip-Hop	Mumbai	Dharmesh Yelande

== Finalists (top 4) ==
Vartika Jha and V Unbeatable became the first two finalists. While Sujan-Aaanchel and Chetan Salunkhe joined them later based on their performance and voting by viewers.

Sr.	Artists	Type	Style	Home Town	Team	Finish
1.	Chetan Salunkhe	Solo	Popping	Pune	Punit	Winner
2.	Sujan and Aaanchel	Duo	Contemporary	Kathmandu & Jorhat	Punit	Runner-up
3.	Vartika Jha	Solo	Popping & Hip-Hop	Sonbhadra	Dharmesh	2nd Runner-up
4	V Unbeatable	Group	Hip-Hop	Bhayandar	Dharmesh	3rd Runner-up

== Double plus ==
- 1. Vartika Jha (Team Dharmesh)
- 2. Rishabh Sharma (Team Shakti)
- 3. B-Unique Crew (Team Shakti)
- 4. Feel Crew (Team Punit)
- 5. Chetan Salunkhe (Team Punit)
- 6. V Unbeatable (Team Dharmesh)
- 7. Sujan & Aaanchel (Team Punit)
- 8. S Unity Crew (Team Dharmesh)
- 9. Gang 13 (Team Dharmesh)

== International squad round ==
- Royal Family Dance Crew
- Poppin John
- Karen and Ricardo
- Shovana Narayan
- Jaja and B-Dash
- Marquese Scott

== Winners of weekly final showdowns ==
- 1. Rishabh Sharma (Team Shakti)
- 2. Chetan Salunkhe (Team Punit)
- 3. V Unbeatable (Team Dharmesh)
- 4. D Core (Team Dharmesh)
- 5. Vartika Jha (Team Dharmesh)
- 6. B-Unique (Team Shakti)

7 dharmesh

== Special guests ==
Special guest appearances
Sr.	Guest(s)	Reason	Episode
1	Shilpa Shetty	Special Appearance	20-21 October
2	Karishma Kapoor	Special Appearance	10-11 November
3	Geeta Kapoor and Terence Lewis	Special Appearance	17-18 November
4	Ketaki Mategaonkar	To Surprise Chetan Salunke	24 November
5	Kapil Dev	Special Appearance	1-2 December
6	Anil Kapoor and Jeetendra	Special Appearance	8-9 December
7	Ranveer Singh and Sara Ali Khan	To Promote Their Film Simmba	15-16 December
8	Govinda	Special Appearance	22-23 December
9	Shah Rukh Khan, Katrina Kaif and Anushka Sharma	To Promote Their Film Zero	29-30 December
10	Manoj Tiwari	To Support Vartika Jha	5 January
11	Lizelle D’Souza, Dhruv D’Souza and Gabriel D’Souza	To Surprise Remo D'Souza	5 January
12	Siddhartha Jadhav	To Support Chetan Salunke	6 January
13	Madhuri Dixit	Special Appearance	12-13 January
14	Prabhu Deva and Ganesh Acharya	Special Appearance	19 January
15	Ankita Lokhande	Performing From Her Film Manikarnika: The Queen of Jhansi	26 January
16	Anil Kapoor, Madhuri Dixit and Riteish Deshmukh	To Promote Their Film Total Dhamaal	2 February
17	Kumar Sanu	Special Appearance	2 February
18	Mouni Roy	Special Performance	2 February
19	Nora Fatehi	Special Performance	2 February
