= Emanne Beasha =

American singer

- Beasha in 2019

Background information
- Born: 18 September 2008 (age 17); Amman, Jordan
- Genres: Opera, Classical-crossover, pop, operatic pop
- Occupation: Singer
- Years active: 2015–present
- Website: www.emannebeasha.com

Emanne Beasha (Arabic: إيمان بيشة; Circassian: Иман Биша; born 18 September 2008) is a Jordanian-American classically-trained singer. She is the winner of the fifth season of the program Arabs Got Talent and finished in ninth place on the fourteenth Season of America's Got Talent.

== Biography ==
Beasha was born in Amman to a Jordanian father of Circassian descent and an American mother. Beasha started to sing opera in Italian from the age of six. Her parents discovered her talent as a two-year-old in Jordan.

Beasha auditioned for Season 5 of Arabs Got Talent in 2017, at age eight, and received the Golden Buzzer. On 20 May she won the final with a cover of "Time to Say Goodbye" and received prize money of $130,000.

In recognition of her win, Beasha received the King Abdullah II Ibn Al Hussein Medal of Merit (Gold) from King Abdullah II during Independence Day celebrations in Raghadan Palace on 25 May 2017, becoming the medal's youngest recipient in history.

Beasha auditioned for Season 14 of America's Got Talent in 2019, for which she sang "Nessun Dorma." She received four yes votes from the judges to advance to the Judge Cuts round.

On August 6, 2019, Beasha appeared on the fourth episode of America's Got Talent's Judge Cuts with guest judge Jay Leno. She performed the opera-style song "Caruso" by Italian pop singer Lucio Dalla and received Leno's Golden Buzzer, becoming the only individual act to receive the buzzer in different global versions of the 'Got Talent' franchise. (The group Zurcaroh had also won it twice.) This qualified her to move on to the quarter-finals live shows.

On August 27, 2019, Beasha sang "Ebben? Ne andrò lontana" ("Well then? I'll Go Far away") from the opera La Wally for her appearance in the quarterfinals of America's Got Talent. After voting occurred, Emanne moved to the semifinals. In the semifinals, she performed an Italian version of "(Everything I Do) I Do It for You" by Bryan Adams, received favorable reviews from the judges, and advanced to the finals in the Judges' Choice. In the finals, she sang "La mamma morta" from Umberto Giordano's opera Andrea Chénier. On the night that the results were announced, she performed Andrea Bocelli's "Time to Say Goodbye" alongside pianist Lang Lang. At the end, she was not in the Top 5 acts and finished in 9th place. Beasha joined André Rieu on the North American leg of his world tour in Tampa on 11 March 2020, but the rest of the tour was cancelled or postponed due to the COVID-19 pandemic.
