= Dana Dajani =

Palestinian actress and writer

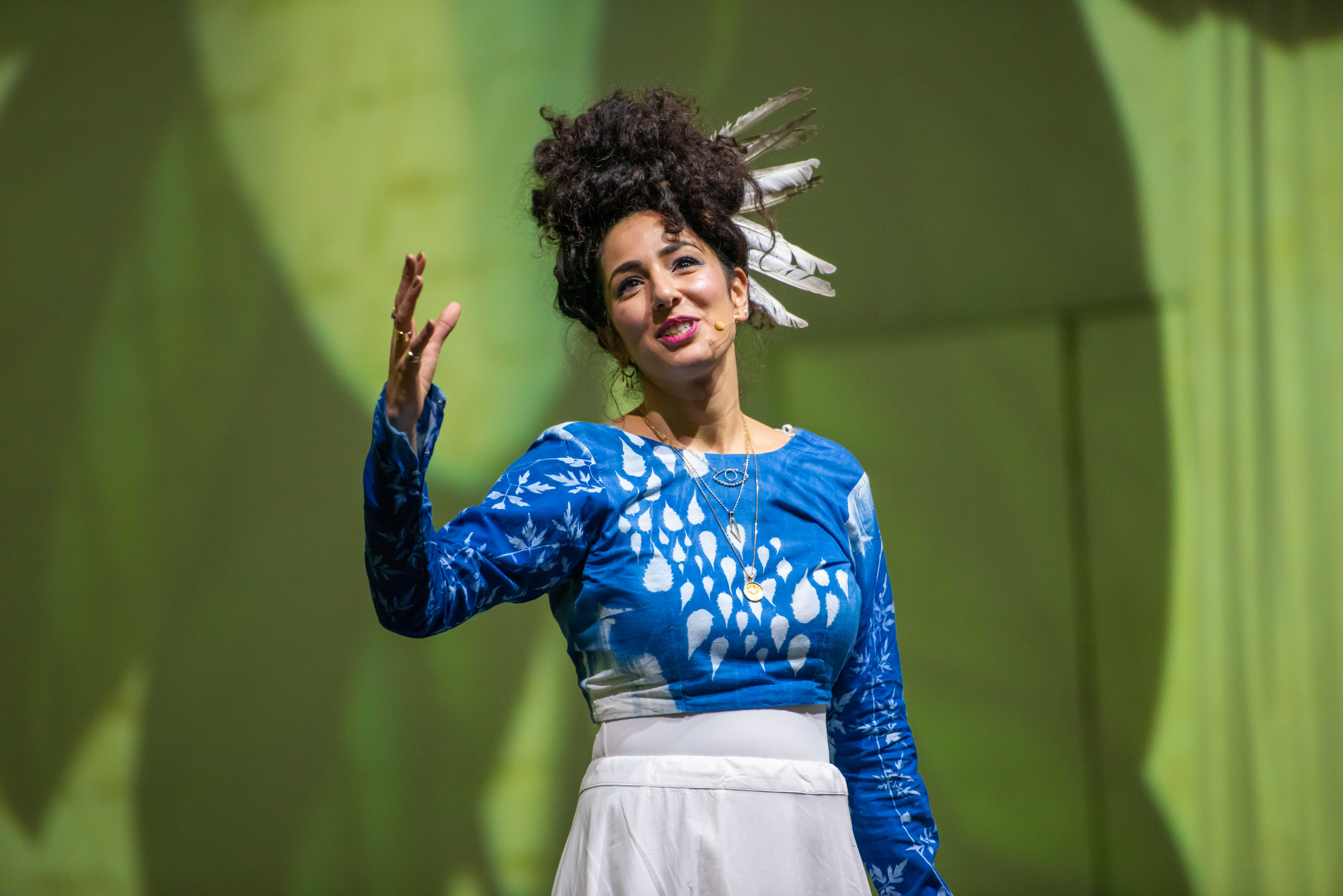
- Dajani performing
- Born: Haifa, Israel
- Education: University of Kansas; Columbia College Chicago (BFA)
- Occupations: Actress, writer
- Years active: 2011–present
- Known for: Love Letters from Palestine

Dana Dajani is a Palestinian actress and writer. Her performance as a visually impaired woman who regains her sight won her the "Best Actress" award at Tropfest Arabia 2011. The film was co-scripted by her and screened at Cannes Short Film Corner in 2012. Dajani gained further acclaim for her activism for Palestine through artistic work, including her spoken-word poem "Love Letters from Palestine".

== Education and early career ==
Dajani began her undergraduate career at the University of Kansas, acting in productions for Paul Lim's English Alternative Theater (EAT). After performing with EAT at the Kennedy Center American College Theatre Festival, Dajani left KU and moved to Chicago. During her semester off, she acted in student short films in Chicago. Through these student directors, Dajani discovered Columbia College Chicago. She transferred to the School of Theatre and graduated in 2010 with a Bachelor of Fine Arts degree in Theater.

During her time in the Windy City, Dajani performed on many of Chicago's "storefront" stages and participated in festivals such as Teatro Luna's 10x10, Rhinofest, and Abbiefest XXI & XXII. Dajani's last main-stage performance in Chicago was in Adventure Stage Chicago's production of Sinbad: The Untold Tale, a play in which she fought using shamshir and rapier blades.

== Current career ==
In 2011, Dajani moved to Dubai. On stage, Dajani wrote and starred in Kalubela, winner of Time Out Dubai's award for "Best Theatrical Performance of 2012". Her short films have been in film festivals across the Middle East, garnering awards such as "Best Actress" in Tropfest 2011 and "Best Film" at the Arab Film Studio Competition 2013. Later that same year, Dajani was invited to Australia to develop and perform a new work at the Sydney Opera House. The play, Oneness: Voice Without Form was commissioned for the 150th anniversary of the birth of Swami Vivekananda. Dajani played 5 roles, including that of Sister Nevedita.

== Spoken-word poetry ==
Dajani recorded two poetry and musical albums in 2013. “Free Flow Live” was the first EP of her musical collaboration called Floetics. Her second EP was "type two error" features 4 tracks.

== Activism for Palestine ==
In 2013, Kharabeesh and Visualizing Palestine released a YouTube video called "The ACTUAL Truth about Palestine", in response to 3 videos created by the Israeli Minister of Foreign Affairs, Danny Ayalon. Danny Ayalon responded to the video in a "Rebuttal."

== Partial list of films ==
- Tooth of Hope
- At First Sight
- In Her Eyes
- The Actual Truth About Palestine
- Melody
- 1% Inspiration
- Angel Trumpets, Devil Trombones
- Maybe We Should Go
