= Qusai (musician) =

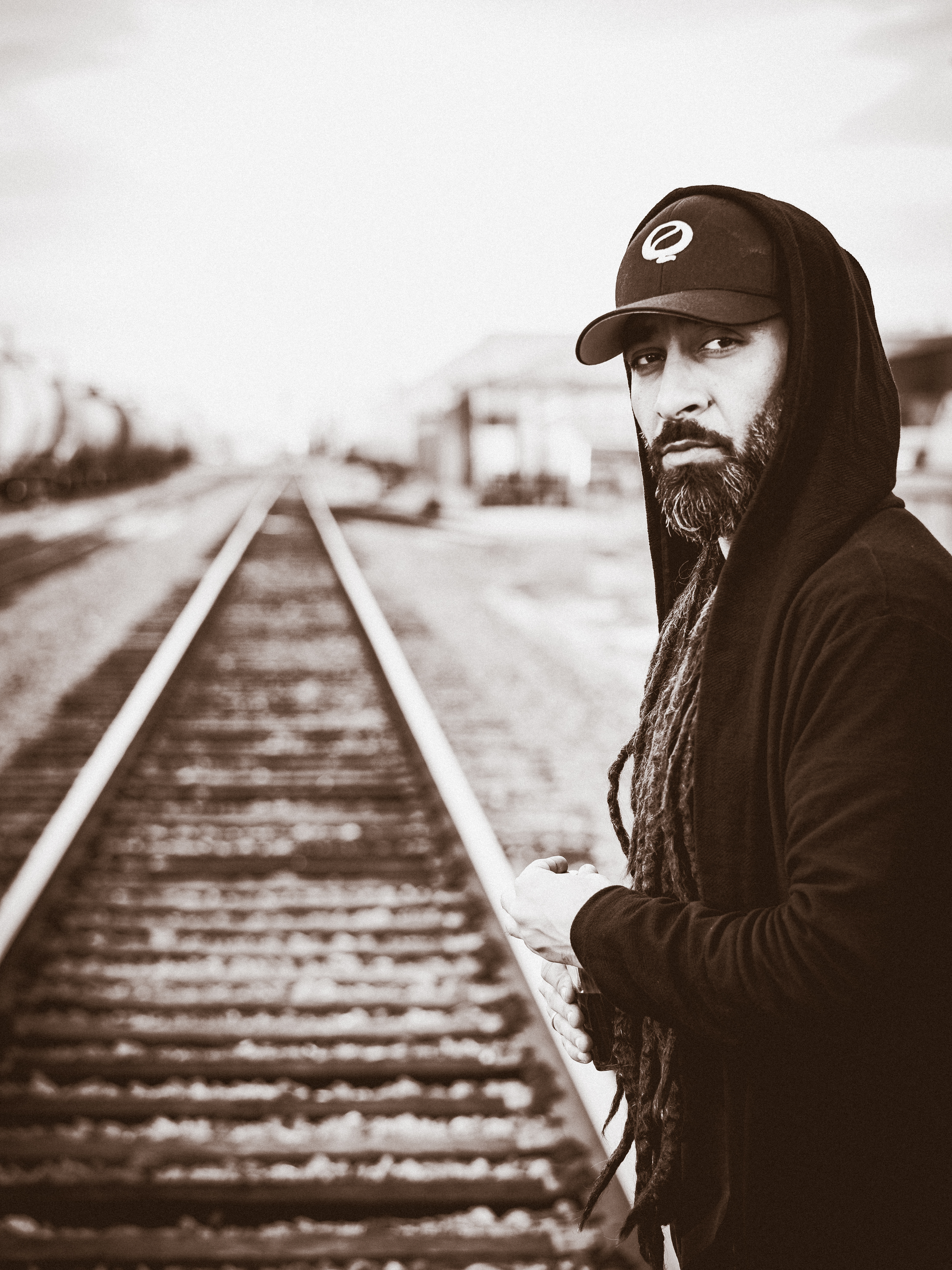

Background information
- Also known as: Don Legend, The Kamelion
- Born: Qusai MNJ Kheder قصي محمد نجيب خضر; May 21, 1978 (age 47); Riyadh, Saudi Arabia
- Origin: Jeddah, Saudi Arabia
- Genres: Hip hop
- Occupations: Rapper; singer-songwriter; record producer; television personality; Host; DJ; Actor; voice actor
- Years active: 1993–present
- Labels: iQ prod.

Qusai Kheder (Arabic: قصي خضر, born 1978) is a Saudi rapper, singer/songwriter, record producer, television personality, voice actor, and DJ.

In addition to his music career, Qusai has appeared on television as the co-host of Hip Hop Na on MTV Arabia with hip-hop producer Fredwreck, and as a co-host, with Raya Abirached, on MBC1's Arabs Got Talent.

== Biography ==
=== Early years and early music career ===
Qusai Kheder was born in Riyadh and raised in Jeddah in the Kingdom of Saudi Arabia. A fan of hip-hop since childhood, Kheder began performing and DJing at the age of 15.

At age 17, in 1996, Kheder moved to the United States to attend college, first to Vermont, and later to the University of Central Florida in Orlando, Florida.

With the introduction of new partners, Eyesomnia Productions evolved into Eyesomnia Enterprises by 2004. Under the Eyesomnia label, Don Legend released two solo albums and also recorded two EPs and a full album as part of the duo Urban Legacy with fellow MC D-Light. The track "Jeddah (My Hometown City)" from his first independent album, The Life of a Lost Soul, generated buzz for the artist in his hometown of Saudi Arabia. Legend performed regularly at several performance venues and music events in the Orlando area during the early to mid-2000s. He also performed in shows in Chicago, Atlanta, New York, and other major U.S. cities.

=== Return to Saudi Arabia ===
Don Legend returned to Saudi Arabia in 2005, changing his stage name to Qusai and signing with Platinum Records. His first album for Platinum was 2008's Don Legend the Kamelion, which sold over 20,000 copies in the Middle East and remained the number one album on the KSA Music Master charts for three consecutive weeks. His second album, Experimental Edutainment (2010), sold 30,000 copies and was the number one album on the Virgin top albums chart in the Persian Gulf region for four consecutive weeks. These sales were achieved without international distribution or online sales.

Qusai records and performs in both Arabic and English. Two of his singles, "The Wedding" (2008) and "The Job" (2010), were number-one songs on Wanasah's Top 10 list and on 103 MBC FM. The video for Qusai's single "Mother" premiered on the MBC television network to coincide with Mother's Day (March 21) in 2009. Qusai continues to perform throughout the US, Europe, Africa, Asia, and the Middle East.

He continued making music for almost two decades, and in 2017, he won the Esquire Man At His Best Award in the Hip Hop music category.

=== Television ===
In addition to his music, Qusai began working in television as well. He and fellow Arabic hip hop artist Fredwreck hosted Hip Hop Na (Our Hip-Hop), a hip-hop talent search contest show, for MTV Arabia in 2007. Hip Hop Na became the first Arabic hip-hop show and the flagship show for MTV Arabia. In 2009, Qusai and Fredwreck began hosting Beit el Hip Hop (The House of Hip-Hop) on Wanasah TV. On January 14, 2011, Qusai began appearing as the co-host, with Raya Abi Rached, of Arabs Got Talent on MBC1. He has shared the stage and performed with many singers, including Ludacris, Akon, Xzibit, and others.

== Discography ==
=== Major label releases ===
- Don Legend the Kamelion (2008)
- Experimental Edutainment (2010)
- The Inevitable Change (2012)
- "BassLine EP" (2016)
- "Saudi EP" (2017)

=== Singles and music videos ===
- 2008: "The Wedding" / "That's Life"
- 2009: "Mother" / "Hayo Al-Saudi"
- 2010: "The Job" / "Any Given Day" / "Father"
- 2011: "Everyone Can Play"
- 2012: "Yalla" / "Change"
- 2013: "Eve" / "Arab World Unite"
- 2014: "Dream"
- 2015: "Umm El-Dunia"
- 2016: "Gone"
- 2017: "All the Way" / "Saudi"
- 2018: "Get Lost" / "The Teacher"
- 2019: "Kan Yama Kan" / "Heat It Up"
- 2020: "My Time" / "Dar Dyali" / "Black Pharaos" / "Artism" / "From Jeddah to Jersey"
- 2022: "7ami"
- 2023: "Give Me a Reason" / "Unleash the Beast" / "Keys" / "Adrenaline Rush" / "Original"
- 2024: "We Ride" / "Zheimer" / "Stayin' Up"

=== TV commercials ===
- PepsiCo / Zain Telecom / Chrysler / Souk.com / Hyundai / OMO

Qusai also voiced Chester Cheetah in the Arabic version of the Cheetos ad "Flamin' Hot Diss Track", which aired on March 11, 2020.

== Television work ==
Year	Work	Channel
2007	Hip Hop Na	MTV Arabia
2009	Beit el Hip Hop	Wanasah TV
2011	Arabs Got Talent	MBC1
2012	Arabs Got Talent 2	MBC1
2013	Arabs Got Talent 3	MBC1
2015	Arabs Got Talent 4	MBC1
2017	Arabs Got Talent 5	MBC1
2019	Arabs Got Talent 6	MBC1

== Filmography ==
Film
Year	Title	Role	Notes
2015	Bilal: A New Breed of Hero	Bilal ibn Rabah	Arabic version
2018	Hotel Transylvania 3: Summer Vacation	Stan	Arabic version
2019	Spies in Disguise	Lance Sterling	Arabic version
2021	Takki (web series) on Netflix	Saria	Season 3

=== Video Games ===
Video Game
Year	Title	Role	Notes
2016	Tom Clancy's The Division	Paul Rhodes	Arabic version
