= Elandsdoorn =

- Location within Limpopo Location within South Africa
- Coordinates: 25.288°S 29.196°E
- Country: South Africa
- Province: Limpopo
- District: Sekhukhune
- Municipality: Elias Motsoaledi

Area
  - Total: 9.02 km^{2} (3.48 sq mi)

Population (2011)
  - Total: 12,941
  - Density: 1,430/km^{2} (3,720/sq mi)

Racial makeup (2011)
  - Black African: 99.1%
  - Coloured: 0.2%
  - Indian/Asian: 0.2%
  - White: 0.3%
  - Other: 0.3%

First languages (2011)
  - Zulu: 45.3%
  - Northern Sotho: 22.1%
  - S. Ndebele: 14.0%
  - Sotho: 6.9%
  - Other: 11.7%
- Time zone: UTC+2 (SAST)

Elandsdoorn is a town in Sekhukhune District Municipality in the Limpopo province of South Africa.
