= Ali Jaber =

Lebanese journalist and business leader

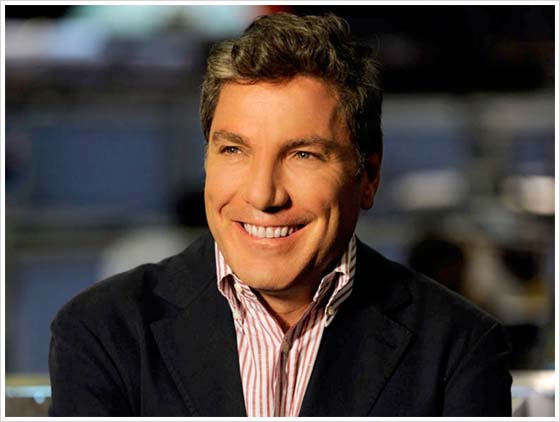
- Born: Ali Moein Jaber علي معين جابر; August 5, 1961 (age 65)
- Education: American University of Beirut, Syracuse University, University of Cambridge
- Occupation: Dean of Mohammad Bin Rashid School Of Communications at American University in Dubai MBC Group TV Director
- Spouse: Tamara
- Children: 2

Ali Jaber (Arabic: علي جابر) (born 1961) is a Lebanese journalist, media consultant, TV personality and the Group TV Director of MBC, the Arab world's largest satellite broadcaster.

== Academic and leadership ==
Mr. Jaber completed a bachelor's degree in business administration at the American University of Beirut in 1984 before going on to earn a master's degree in communications at Syracuse University in the US in 1986.

In 2008, Sheikh Mohammed bin Rashid Al Maktoum instructed Ali to set up a Communication School at the American University in Dubai. In July 2008 Ali was named Dean of Mohammed Bin Rashid School of Communication (MBRSC) and this year MBRSC graduates fifty students with degrees in Journalism and Digital Storytelling. One of the unique characteristics of the School is that it teaches all media writing courses in the Arabic language and its curricula focuses on Digital Media and Multi-platform Storytelling.

He also serves on the Board of Directors of two non-governmental organizations: Clinton Global Initiative (CGI) and Young Arab Leaders (YAL).

Ali Jaber was selected to the list of the 500 Most Influential Muslims in the world by the Royal Islamic Strategic Studies Centre, an independent non-governmental research entity.

Ali Jaber was invited to be a speaker at the September 2011 TEDxBeirut conference for inspirational leaders. His address was about the official launch of The Global Classroom which he had established at the American University in Dubai in partnership with the U.S. company Cisco. It was the first initiative in the Arab world to give students access to the best professors, business leaders and guest lecturers located around the globe.

== Career ==
Upon returning to Beirut, Ali joined the Fine Arts faculty of Beirut University College. There he helped set up their Broadcasting Department and for eight years taught a range of courses in television production.

While working as a journalist in Beirut, Ali Jaber interviewed billionaire Rafik Hariri in 1992, months before he became prime minister of Lebanon. Ali Jaber was later asked to set up Future TV, a privately owned pan-Arab television station Hariri's television network, which is still in operation. He managed Future TV until 2003. While with Future, he also started and managed a youth-oriented sister channel, Zen TV, which he ran for five years.

In 2004, he was approached by Sheikh Mohammed bin Rashid Al Maktoum, the Ruler of Dubai, and brought in as a consultant to head Dubai Media Incorporated’s (DMI), to revamp and re-launch its four national pan-Arab satellite channels.

In 2006, he was appointed DMI's Managing Editor after having successfully managed to build, restructure and manage seven channels for DMI: Dubai TV, Dubai One, Sama Dubai, Dubai Sports One, Dubai Sports Two, Dubai Racing and Noor Dubai.

Working closely with current UAE Vice President and Prime Minister and Ruler of Dubai Sheikh Mohammed Bin Rashid Al Maktoum, DMI's Board Members and the Chairman of Dubai's governmental organizations, his responsibilities are wide-ranging and have grown to include the development of the media sector in the UAE.

Ali Jaber is group TV director of MBC since September 2011. He is in charge of MBC's 13 television channels, including MBC MASR which started broadcasting November 9, 2012. He serves as a celebrity judge on MBC's Arabs Got Talent.

His judgements have had critics to liken him to Simon Cowell. He became a household name due to the widespread popularity of the show in the region.

Sheikh Hamdan Mohammad Bin Rashid Al Maktoum, Crown Prince of Dubai issued a decree on July 21, 2014 setting up The Dubai Council for Design and Fashion, which will be entrusted to work on plans and regulations for the purpose of establishing Dubai among the world capitals for design and fashion, The decree named Ali Jaber, Group TV Director of MBC along with other bright Lebanese and Arab Fashion, design & Media Industry leaders.

== Journalism ==
Ali Jaber was a journalist covering the war in Lebanon and Iraq between the years 1987 to 1999. He was the correspondent of The New York Times and The Times of London between 1989 and 1994, and Chief Correspondent for Lebanon and Syria for the German Press Agency (DPA) from 1987 to 1999.

== Education and volunteer work ==
Ali Jaber completed a master's degree in public relations at Syracuse University in the U.S. in 1986 and a bachelor's degree in business administration at the American University of Beirut, Lebanon, in 1984.

After his return from Syracuse University, Ali Jaber helped to set up the Broadcasting Department at the Fine Arts faculty of the Beirut University College (the Lebanese American University), where he also taught for eight years a range of courses in television production.

He is currently studying for a PhD in management practices in Arab satellite televisions, at Cambridge University.

During the civil war in Lebanon, Ali Jaber was a volunteer for the Red Cross. He has also been a volunteer from many years with the Lebanese association of the mentally handicapped children and is currently an ambassador for SANAD, a home hospice association in Lebanon.

Sheikh Hamdan Mohammad Bin Rashid Al Maktoum, Crown Prince of Dubai, issued a decree on July 21, 2014 setting up The Dubai Council for Design and Fashion, the decree named Ali Jaber as board Member along with other Lebanese and Arab fashion, design, and media industry leaders.
