= America's Got Talent season 14 =

14th season of America's Got Talent

America's Got Talent
- Season 14
- Promotional poster for season 14, featuring (L to R) judges Mandel, Union, Cowell, Hough, and host Crews
- Showrunners: Jason Raff; Sam Donnelly
- Hosted by: Terry Crews
- Judges: Howie Mandel; Gabrielle Union; Julianne Hough; Simon Cowell
- Winner: Kodi Lee
- Runner-up: Detroit Youth Choir
- Finals venue: Dolby Theatre
- No. of episodes: 23

Release
- Original network: NBC
- Original release: May 28 – September 18, 2019

Season chronology
- ← Previous; Season 13 Next → Season 15

Judges and Host for America's Got Talent Season 14

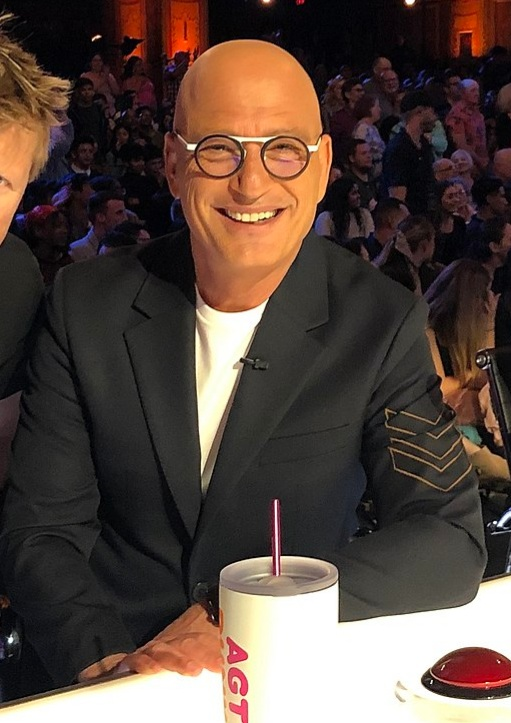
Howie Mandel

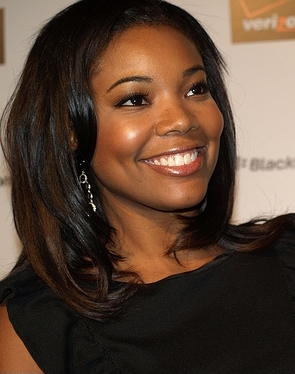
Gabrielle Union

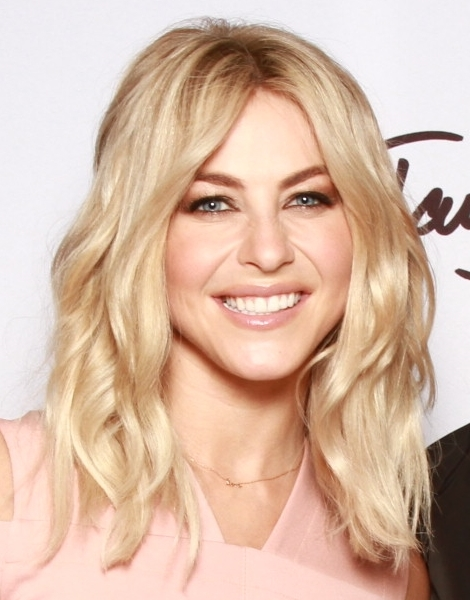
Julianne Hough

Simon Cowell

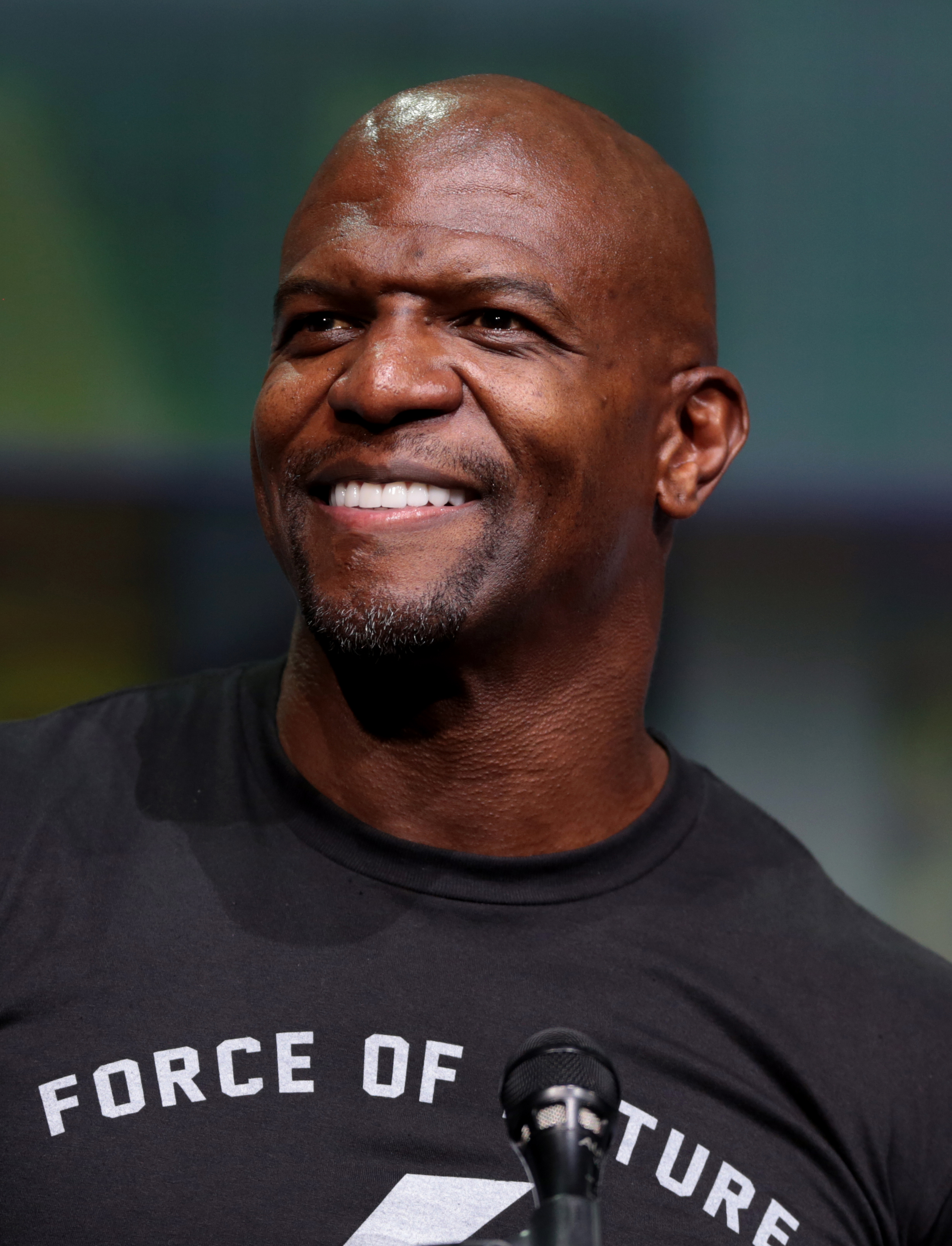
Terry Crews

The fourteenth season of American talent show competition series America's Got Talent was broadcast on NBC from May 28 to September 18, 2019. After the previous season, Tyra Banks left the program to focus on other projects, leading to Terry Crews replacing her as host following his involvement on America's Got Talent: The Champions earlier that year. In addition, both Mel B and Heidi Klum also left the program, with their replacements as judges being Gabrielle Union and Julianne Hough. The guest judges for the season's Judge Cuts stage included Brad Paisley, Dwyane Wade, Ellie Kemper and Jay Leno. The semi-finals involved two additional guest judges, a first in the program's history, with Sean Hayes and Queen Latifah.

The fourteenth season was won by singer and pianist Kodi Lee, with the Detroit Youth Choir finishing second, and stand-up comedian Ryan Niemiller placing third. During its broadcast, the season averaged around 9.12 million viewers.

== Season overview ==
Open auditions were held in late 2018 in New York City, Detroit, Knoxville, Tampa, Charlotte, San Antonio, and Los Angeles. As with the previous year, the judges' auditions were held in March 2019, at the Pasadena Civic Auditorium in Los Angeles. The Judge Cuts stage of the competition included singer Brad Paisley, former basketball player Dwyane Wade, actress Ellie Kemper and host Jay Leno. After the previous season, Tyra Banks left the program to focus on other television projects, announcing her decision in late December 2018. Due to her departure, Terry Crews became her replacement beginning in April 2019, after being popular with viewers as host of the first season of the spin-off series America's Got Talent: The Champions. In addition to the departure of Banks, two judges were replaced due to conflicting obligations in 2019. Mel B could not return due to being a part of the Spice Girls reunion tour that year. Heidi Klum signed on to producing a new fashion competition series for Amazon and could not commit to being on AGT. Julianne Hough, a dancer, and actress Gabrielle Union were offered the role of judges, with the announcement of their predecessor's replacement being made at the same time as the announcement about Crews in April 2019.

This season had a minor change to the format of the program, with the semi-finals featuring two guest judges. Their inclusion would only be for feedback on the performances of the semi-finalists, not for stopping a performance with a buzzer nor having any involvement with the judge votes. The judges recruited for this format in this season were Sean Hayes and Queen Latifah. Other than this change, an undisclosed issue forced the judges' vote to be suspended during first quarter-final's results. While the top six quarter-finalists voted for by the public were advanced, those placed 7th, 8th and 9th respectively faced only the online vote as a result.

Of the participants who auditioned for the season, thirty-six secured a place in the live quarter-finals with twelve quarter-finalists in each one. Among those were singer and pianist Kodi Lee, singer and rapper Joseph Allen, violinist Tyler Butler-Figueroa the Detroit Youth Choir, and singer Luke Islam who had each received a Golden Buzzer from the main judges and host; singer and guitarist Sophie Pecora, acrobatic dance group V.Unbeatable, light-up dance group Light Balance Kids and opera singer Emanne Beasha, who had each received a Golden Buzzer from the guest judges; singer Ansley Burns, mentalists The Sentimentalists and aerialist Matthew Richardson, who were chosen as Wildcard quarter-finalists. About twenty-two quarter-finalists advanced and were split between the two semi-finals, including dog tricks act Lukas & Falco (chosen as the Wildcard semi-finalist), with ten semi-finalists securing a place in the finals. Here is a list of the results of each participant's overall performance in this season:

Winner | Runner-up | Third place | Finalist | Semi-finalist
Quarter-finalist | Wildcard Quarter-finalist | Wildcard Semi-finalist
Golden Buzzer - Auditions | Golden Buzzer - Judge Cuts

Participant	Age(s) ^{1}	Genre	Act	From	Quarter-Final	Result
Alex Dowis	40	Variety	Blacklight Painter	Prague, Czech Republic	1	Semi-finalist
Ansley Burns	12	Singing	Singer	Easley, South Carolina	1	Semi-finalist
Benicio Bryant	15	Singing	Singer	Maple Valley, Washington	3	Finalist
Berywam	25-30	Music	Beatboxing Group	Toulouse, France	3	Eliminated
Bir Khalsa	30-39	Danger	Danger Group	Tarn Taran, India	1	Eliminated
Carmen Carter	55	Singing	Singer	Los Angeles	1	Eliminated
Charlotte Summers	13	Singing	Singer	Marbella, Spain	2	Eliminated
Chris Kläfford	30	Singing / Music	Singer & Guitarist	Lindesberg, Sweden	2	Semi-finalist
Detroit Youth Choir	8-18	Singing	Choir	Detroit	3	Runner-up
Dom Chambers	26	Magic	Magician	Melbourne, Australia	3	Semi-finalist
Emanne Beasha	10	Singing	Opera Singer	North Port, Florida	3	Finalist
Emerald Belles	15-18	Dance	Precision Dance Group	Southlake, Texas	1	Eliminated
Eric Chien	26	Magic	Magician	Houston	3	Semi-finalist
GFORCE	10-13	Singing	Vocal Group	Toronto	1	Eliminated
Gonzo	33	Music	Tambourinist	Tokyo	3	Eliminated
Greg Morton	60	Comedy	Impressionist	Toronto	1	Semi-finalist
Jackie Fabulous	48	Comedy	Comedian	New York City	3	Semi-finalist
Joseph Allen	21	Singing	Rapper	Killeen, Texas	2	Eliminated
Kodi Lee	23	Singing / Music	Singer & Pianist	Lake Elsinore, California	1	Winner
Light Balance Kids	11-13	Dance	Light-Up Dance Group	Kyiv, Ukraine	2	Finalist
Lukas & Falco	22 & 9 ^{2}	Animals	Dog Act	Vienna, Austria	3	Semi-finalist
Luke Islam	12	Singing	Singer	Garden City, New York	1	Semi-finalist
MacKenzie	31	Singing	Singer	Hume, Virginia	3	Eliminated
Marcin Patrzalek	18	Music	Guitarist	Kielce, Poland	3	Semi-finalist
Marina Mazepa	22	Acrobatics / Dance	Contortionist Dancer	Konotop, Ukraine	2	Eliminated
Matthew Richardson	33	Acrobatics	Cyr Wheel Acrobat	Savannah, Georgia	3	Eliminated
Messoudi Brothers	25-30	Acrobatics	Acrobatic Trio	Einbeck, Germany	1	Semi-finalist
Ndlovu Youth Choir	13-27	Singing	Choir	Elandsdoorn, South Africa	2	Finalist
Nick & Lindsay	38 & 33	Singing / Danger	Opera Singer & Sideshow Duo	New Orleans	2	Eliminated
Robert Finley	65	Singing	Singer	Winnsboro, Louisiana	2	Semi-finalist
Ryan Niemiller	36	Comedy	Comedian	Indianapolis	2	Third place
Sophie Pecora	15	Singing / Music	Singer & Guitarist	Danville, California	1	Eliminated
The Sentimentalists	25 & 44	Magic	Mentalist Duo	Toronto	2	Eliminated
Tyler Butler-Figueroa	11	Music	Violinist	Raleigh, North Carolina	2	Finalist
V.Unbeatable	12-27	Acrobatics / Dance	Acrobatic Dance Group	Mumbai, India	2	Grand-finalist
Voices of Service	45-54	Singing	Vocal Group	Fort Belvoir, Virginia	1	Grand-finalist

- ^1 Ages denoted for a participant(s), pertain to their final performance for this season.
- ^2 The latter value denotes the age of the dog, as disclosed by its owner.

=== Quarter-finals summary ===
Buzzed Out | Judges' choice | Advanced to Semi-finals
Won Online Public Vote | Won Judges' Vote | Lost Judges' Vote

==== Quarter-final 1 (August 13) ====
Guest Performers, Results Show: Shin Lim, Bianca Ryan, Brian King Joseph, and Sofie Dossi

Quarter-Finalist	Order	Buzzes ^{3}				Result (August 14) ^{3}
Quarter-Finalist	Order	Cowell	Hough	Union	Mandel	Result (August 14) ^{3}
GFORCE	1					Eliminated
Greg Morton	2					Advanced
Carmen Carter	3					Eliminated
Emerald Belles	4					Eliminated (Online Public Vote)
Sophie Pecora	5					Eliminated (Online Public Vote)
Messoudi Brothers	6					Advanced
Voices of Service	7					Advanced
Ansley Burns	8					Advanced (Online Public Vote)
Alex Dowis	9					Advanced
Luke Islam	10					Advanced
Bir Khalsa	11					Eliminated
Kodi Lee	12					Advanced

- ^3 Due to an undisclosed technical issue, the judges' vote was not held for this quarter-final; the results pertain to the standard public vote for the top 6 quarter-finalist, and the online vote for the 7th favored by the public.

==== Quarter-final 2 (August 20) ====
Guest Performer, Results Show: Susan Boyle

Quarter-Finalist	Order	Buzzes and Judges' votes				Result (August 21)
Quarter-Finalist	Order	Cowell	Hough	Union	Mandel	Result (August 21)
Charlotte Summers	1					Eliminated (Judges' Vote Tied - Lost by Public Vote)
Nick & Lindsay	2					Eliminated
Chris Kläfford	3					Advanced (Online Public Vote)
Marina Mazepa	4					Eliminated
Robert Finley	5					Advanced
The Sentimentalists	6					Eliminated
Ryan Niemiller	7					Advanced
V.Unbeatable	8					Advanced
Joseph Allen	9					Eliminated
Light Balance Kids	10					Advanced
Tyler Butler-Figueroa	11					Advanced
Ndlovu Youth Choir	12					Advanced (Judges' Vote Tied - Won by Public Vote)

==== Quarter-final 3 (August 27) ====
Guest Performers, Results Show: Celestia, and Deadly Games

Quarter-Finalist	Order	Buzzes and Judges' votes				Result (August 28)
Quarter-Finalist	Order	Cowell	Hough	Union	Mandel	Result (August 28)
Detroit Youth Choir	1					Advanced
Lukas & Falco	2		^{4}			Eliminated (Lost Judges' Vote)
Dom Chambers	3					Advanced
Benicio Bryant	4					Advanced
Gonzo	5					Eliminated
Marcin Patrzalek	6		^{4}			Advanced (Won Judges' Vote)
Eric Chien	7					Advanced
Berywam	8					Eliminated
Matthew Richardson	9					Eliminated
MacKenzie	10					Eliminated
Jackie Fabulous	11					Advanced (Online Public Vote)
Emanne Beasha	12					Advanced

- ^4 Due to the majority vote for Marcin Patrzalek, Hough's voting intention was not revealed.

=== Semi-finals summary ===
Buzzed Out | Judges' choice | Advanced to Finals
Won Online Public Vote | Won Judges' Vote | Lost Judges' Vote

==== Semi-final 1 (September 3) ====
Guest Performers, Results Show: Darci Lynne, and Preacher Lawson

Semi-Finalist	Order	Buzzes and Judges' votes ^{5}				Result (September 4)
Semi-Finalist	Order	Cowell	Hough	Union	Mandel	Result (September 4)
Ndlovu Youth Choir	1					Advanced (Won Judges' Vote)
Ansley Burns	2					Eliminated
Messoudi Brothers	3					Eliminated
Tyler Butler-Figueroa	4					Advanced
Greg Morton	5					Eliminated
Kodi Lee	6					Advanced
Jackie Fabulous	7					Eliminated
Robert Finley	8					Eliminated (Lost Judges' Vote)
Eric Chien	9					Eliminated
Light Balance Kids	10					Advanced (Online Public Vote)
Benicio Bryant	11					Advanced

- ^5 Sean Hayes was included with the judging panel for this semi-final, but could only provide feedback; he did not have anything to do with the judges' vote or buzzing semi-finalists.

==== Semi-final 2 (September 10) ====
Guest Performers, Results Show: Tokio Myers & Stewart Copeland, and Piff the Magic Dragon

Semi-Finalist	Order	Buzzes and Judges' votes ^{6}				Result (September 11)
Semi-Finalist	Order	Cowell	Hough	Union	Mandel	Result (September 11)
V.Unbeatable	1					Advanced
Dom Chambers	2					Eliminated
Luke Islam	3					Eliminated
Lukas & Falco	4				^{7}	Eliminated
Chris Kläfford	5					Eliminated
Detroit Youth Choir	6					Advanced
Alex Dowis	7					Eliminated (Lost Judges' Vote)
Marcin Patrzalek	8					Eliminated
Emanne Beasha	9					Advanced (Won Judges' Vote)
Ryan Niemiller	10					Advanced (Online Public Vote)
Voices of Service	11					Advanced

- ^6 Queen Latifah was included with the judging panel for this semi-final, but could only provide feedback; she did not have anything to do with the judges' vote or buzzing semi-finalists.
- ^7 Although Mandel's buzzer was pressed by Lukas & Falco during their performance, he admitted he would have done so himself regardless of their action.

=== Finals (September 17–18) ===
Guest Performers, Finale: Cher and Lilly Singh

Winner | Runner-up | 3rd place | Top 5

Finalist	Performed with (2nd Performance)	Result (September 18)
Benicio Bryant	Ozuna	Finalist
Detroit Youth Choir	Kygo & Macklemore ^{8}	2nd
Emanne Beasha	Lang Lang	Finalist
Kodi Lee	Leona Lewis	1st
Light Balance Kids	Paula Abdul ^{9}	Finalist
Ndlovu Youth Choir	Kygo & Macklemore ^{8}	Finalist
Ryan Niemiller	Chris Jericho ^{10}	3rd
Tyler Butler-Figueroa	Brian King Joseph	Finalist
V.Unbeatable	Julianne Hough	Grand-finalist
Voices of Service	Billy Ray Cyrus	Grand-finalist

- ^8 Ndlovu Youth Choir & Detroit Youth Choir conducted two joint routines for their second performance, and thus shared the same guest performer for each.
- ^9 Abdul was not revealed until after the performance.
- ^10 Ryan Niemiller's second performance with Chris klafrd was pre-recorded before the finale.

== Ratings ==
Viewership and ratings per episode of America's Got Talent season 14
No.	Title	Air date	Timeslot (ET)	Rating/share (18–49)	Viewers (millions)	DVR (18–49)	DVR viewers (millions)	Total (18–49)	Total viewers (millions)
1	"Auditions 1"	May 28, 2019	Tuesday 8:00 p.m.	1.7/8	9.75	0.8	3.08	2.5	12.83
2	"Auditions 2"	June 4, 2019	Tuesday 8:00 p.m.	1.6/9	9.81	0.7	2.89	2.4	12.71
3	"Auditions 3"	June 11, 2019	Tuesday 8:00 p.m.	1.5/8	9.45	0.7	2.79	2.2	12.24
4	"Auditions 4"	June 18, 2019	Tuesday 8:00 p.m.	1.6/8	10.00	0.7	2.65	2.2	12.64
5	"Auditions 5"	June 25, 2019	Tuesday 8:00 p.m.	1.6/8	10.13	0.6	2.58	2.3	12.71
6	"Best of Auditions"	July 2, 2019	Tuesday 8:00 p.m.	1.0/6	6.82	TBD	TBD	TBD	TBD
7	"Auditions 6"	July 9, 2019	Tuesday 8:00 p.m.	1.5/8	9.81	TBD	TBD	TBD	TBD
8	"Judge Cuts 1"	July 16, 2019	Tuesday 8:00 p.m.	1.5/9	9.53	TBD	TBD	TBD	TBD
9	"Judge Cuts 2"	July 23, 2019	Tuesday 8:00 p.m.	1.7/9	10.12	TBD	TBD	TBD	TBD
10	"Judge Cuts 3"	July 30, 2019	Tuesday 8:00 p.m.	1.2/6	7.48	TBD	TBD	TBD	TBD
11	"Judge Cuts 4"	August 6, 2019	Tuesday 8:00 p.m.	1.5/8	9.65	TBD	TBD	TBD	TBD
12	"Quarter Finals 1"	August 13, 2019	Tuesday 8:00 p.m.	1.4/7	9.10	TBD	TBD	TBD	TBD
13	"Live Results 1"	August 14, 2019	Wednesday 8:00 p.m.	1.1/7	7.89	TBD	TBD	TBD	TBD
14	"Quarter Finals 2"	August 20, 2019	Tuesday 8:00 p.m.	1.6/9	9.42	TBD	TBD	TBD	TBD
15	"Live Results 2"	August 21, 2019	Wednesday 8:00 p.m.	1.1/6	8.11	TBD	TBD	TBD	TBD
16	"Quarter Finals 3"	August 27, 2019	Tuesday 8:00 p.m.	1.3/7	8.98	TBD	TBD	TBD	TBD
17	"Live Results 3"	August 28, 2019	Wednesday 8:00 p.m.	1.1/6	8.00	TBD	TBD	TBD	TBD
18	"Semifinals 1"	September 3, 2019	Tuesday 8:00 p.m.	1.5/7	9.11	TBD	TBD	TBD	TBD
19	"Live Results 4"	September 4, 2019	Wednesday 8:00 p.m.	1.2/7	8.55	TBD	TBD	TBD	TBD
20	"Semifinals 2"	September 10, 2019	Tuesday 8:00 p.m.	1.4/7	9.48	TBD	TBD	TBD	TBD
21	"Live Results 5"	September 11, 2019	Wednesday 8:00 p.m.	1.2/6	8.57	TBD	TBD	TBD	TBD
22	"Live Finals"	September 17, 2019	Tuesday 8:00 p.m.	1.6/9	9.88	TBD	TBD	TBD	TBD
23	"Live Results Finale"	September 18, 2019	Wednesday 8:00 p.m.	1.5/8	10.21	TBD	TBD	TBD	TBD
