= Arabs Got Talent =

2011 Arabic TV series or program

- Genre: Reality
- Created by: Simon Cowell
- Presented by: Raya Abirached; Qusai
- Judges: Ali Jaber; Najwa Karam; Nasser Al Qasabi; Amr Adeeb; Ahmed Helmy; Bassem Youssef
- Country of origin: Arab World
- Original language: Arabic
- No. of seasons: 7

Production
- Running time: 60–120 min

Original release
- Network: MBC1; MBC Masr; MBC Iraq
- Release: January 14, 2011 – present

Related
- Britain's Got Talent; Persia's Got Talent; Canada's Got Talent; America's Got Talent

Arabs Got Talent (Arabic: أرابز غوت تالنت) is an Arab reality television talent show broadcast by MBC 1 in the Arab world; it is produced by the MBC and was first broadcast on 14 January 2011. The show features contestants with a variety of talents, such as singing, break-dancing, comedians, magicians, and rapping. The show features three celebrity judges, popular in the Middle East. They currently are Lebanese singer Najwa Karam; the dean of the journalism school at the American University in Dubai Ali Jaber; and Ahmed Helmy, an Egyptian actor. The show's venue is in Lebanon.

Though entry into the semi-finals is based on the judges' vote, the voting in the semi-finals and final is an audience vote, akin to other Got Talent shows. The grand prize is 500,000 Saudi Riyals and a brand new Chrysler 300 as well as a contract with MBC.

The show finished its second season on June 29, 2012. The third season started airing September 14 moving its timeslot from Fridays to Saturdays. The fourth season began airing on December 20. The fifth season ended May 20, 2017, with eight-year-old opera singer Emanne Beasha winning.

The show is hosted by Saudi rapper and musician Qusai Kheder and Lebanese TV presenter Raya Abirached.

== Presenters and judges ==
| Presenters | Season 1 | Season 2 | Season 3 | Season 4 | Season 5 | Season 6 | Season 7 |
|---|---|---|---|---|---|---|---|
| Qusai | | | | | | | |
| Raya Abirached | | | | | | | |

| Judges | Season 1 | Season 2 | Season 3 | Season 4 | Season 5 | Season 6 | Season 7 |
|---|---|---|---|---|---|---|---|
| Ali Jaber | | | | | | | |
| Najwa Karam | | | | | | | |
| Amr Adib | | | | | | | |
| Nasser Al Qasabi | | | | | | | |
| Ahmed Helmy | | | | | | | |
| Bassem Youssef | | | | | | | |

== Selection process ==
=== Producers' auditions ===
Contestants are initially chosen at non-televised auditions in the capitals of participating Arab country, such as Doha in Qatar.

=== Judges' auditions ===
Chosen contestants proceed to perform in front of the celebrity judges. It is by the judges' votes that they enter the next round. Judges may terminate a contestant's performance by buzzing in, signifying an X. However, buzzes from all judges are required to stop the performance. These auditions are televised weekly on Saturdays on MBC1.

=== Live shows ===
The semi-finals and final are broadcast live. They feature performances by the contestants, usually on a grander scale. Judges can still stop a performance if all three buzz in, three times. In the semi-final, the winners are chosen by the viewers' voting (by means of texting), though only the most-voted-for contestant proceeds to the final, the second and third placed proceed via a vote by the judges.

In the final, fourteen contestants remain and, after each contestant finishes their performance, the winner is chosen by the viewers' voting.

== Seasons overview ==
| Season : | Premiere | Final | Winner | Channels |
|---|---|---|---|---|
| 1 | February 25, 2011 | April 14, 2011 | Amr Katamesh | MBC1, MBC Masr |
| 2 | April 6, 2012 | June 29, 2012 | Khawater Al-Zalam | MBC1, MBC Masr |
| 3 | September 14, 2013 | December 7, 2013 | Sima group | MBC1, MBC Masr |
| 4 | December 20, 2014 | March 7, 2015 | Salah Entertainer | MBC1, MBC Masr |
| 5 | March 11, 2017 | May 20, 2017 | Emanne Beasha | MBC1, MBC Masr |
| 6 | February 16, 2019 | April 27, 2019 | Mayyas | MBC1, MBC Iraq, LBCI |
| 7 | October 16, 2024 | December 18, 2024 | Mandalab | MBC1, MBC Masr, MBC5, MBC Iraq |
