= Orchestre de la Francophonie =

Canadian symphony orchestra

The Orchestre de la Francophonie is a Canadian symphony orchestra based in Montreal. It was founded in as temporary orchestra to play at the 2001 Jeux de la Francophonie (Francophone Games) in Canada. However, it went on to become a permanent orchestra which specializes in training young musicians. The average age of the members is 24. Half of them come from Quebec with the remainder from other Canadian provinces and French-speaking countries. The orchestra's founding artistic director and chief conductor is Jean-Philippe Tremblay. The orchestra has released several recordings on the Analekta label, including a complete set of Beethoven's symphonies and has annual concert season in July and August.
