= Jean-Philippe Tremblay =

Canadian orchestra conductor (born 1978)

Jean-Philippe Tremblay (born 1978) is a Canadian orchestra conductor. In addition to an international career as guest conductor, he is the founding Artistic Director and chief conductor of the Montreal based Orchestre de la Francophonie.

Tremblay was born in Chicoutimi and initially trained in viola, composition and conducting at the Conservatoire de musique du Québec there. He went on to further study at the faculty of music of the University of Montreal, the Pierre Monteux School, the Tanglewood Music Center and the Royal Academy of Music in London.
