= Raya Abirached =

Lebanese TV presenter (born 1977)

Raya Abirached ريا أبي راشد
- Born: May 12, 1977 (age 49); Beirut, Lebanon
- Education: University of Westminster
- Occupations: TV presenter; celebrity journalist
- Known for: Arabs Got Talent
- Spouse: Valerio Cammarano (m. 2011)
- Children: 1

Raya Abirached (Arabic: ريا أبي راشد, born 12 May 1977) is a Lebanese TV presenter and celebrity journalist at MBC.

She is best known for co-hosting the hit TV talent show, Arabs Got Talent. She also hosts Scoop with Raya, a show which provides news and interviews with Hollywood actors and directors, and has been referred to as "the Arab version of E!"

== Biography ==
Abirached started her career as a print and broadcast journalist for Radio du Mont Liban (RML) and MTV in Beirut before moving to the UK in 1999. She holds a Bachelor of Arts degree in economics, a Masters in Cinema, and a Masters in Broadcast Journalism from the University of Westminster. She is fluent in Arabic, English, French and Italian.

== Career ==
Abirached has interviewed movie stars and directors including: Tom Cruise, Angelina Jolie, George Clooney, Brad Pitt, Clint Eastwood, Martin Scorsese, Julia Roberts and Natalie Portman. She has also interviewed Mariah Carey, Beyoncé and Shakira, among others; as well as sporting icons Luís Figo and Boris Becker.

Abirached previously hosted the weekly business show "World Business", which aired on CNBC Europe and Asia, PBS in America and Al Arabiya in the Arab world. She also hosted events like the American Idol competition in Dubai as well as the launch of Ferrari World Abu Dhabi.

Abirached also regularly collaborates as a celebrity journalist with several TV stations like Entertainment Tonight in the US, Star TV in Switzerland, ZDF in Germany, ORF in Austria and Telecine in Brazil and is often requested to do generic interviews for major movie studios like Warner Bros., Disney and Paramount.

Her Facebook page has more than 3 million followers, her Instagram over 5 million followers, and according to Forbes, she ranks 92 among the top 100 Arab celebrities.

== Personal life ==
In 2011, Abirached married an Italian sports journalist, Valerio Cammarano, with whom she has one daughter, Lola, born in 2016.

== Filmography ==
Year	Title	Role	Notes
2016	The Angry Birds Movie	Matilda	Arabic version
2017	Smurfs: The Lost Village	Smurfwillow	Arabic version
2018	Hotel Transylvania 3: Summer Vacation	Ericka	Arabic version
2019	The Angry Birds Movie 2	Matilda	Arabic version
2019	Spies in Disguise	Geraldine	Arabic version
2021	Space Jam: A New Legacy	Lola Bunny	Arabic version

=== Television ===
Year	Title	Role	Notes
2005	Scoop with Raya	Host	
2020	Future's Folktales	Um Sayel	Spacetoon Arabic version
