= World of Dance season 4 =

World of Dance
- Season 4
- Hosted by: Scott Evans
- Judges: Ne-Yo; Jennifer Lopez; Derek Hough
- Winner: MDC 3
- Runner-up: Jefferson y Adrianita

Release
- Original network: NBC
- Original release: May 26 – August 12, 2020

Season chronology
- ← Previous; Season 3

The fourth season of the American reality competition television series World of Dance premiered on May 26, 2020, on NBC. Ne-Yo, Jennifer Lopez, and Derek Hough returned as the judges for their fourth consecutive seasons. Access Hollywood co-host Scott Evans returned as host for his second season.

== Production ==
=== Format changes ===
The qualifiers were no longer held in the studio; instead, they were recorded in a warehouse with no live audience. In addition, contested were led to believe that the qualifiers were auditions.

The scoring system was abolished in favor of votes; this applied for the qualifiers and duels. Contestants need at least two yeses to proceed to the duels. Judges may also cast a "callback" vote to contestants a final chance to perform again to advance to the duels.

The team divisions were merged within the junior and upper, resulting in only 2 divisions.

In the duels, contestants no longer chose their own opponents. Instead, the judges picked and the contestants only learned of the decision upon entering the room. Additionally, a guest judge picked which contestants performed head-to-head in the redemption duels.

== Judges, host, and mentors ==
Season 4 host and judges

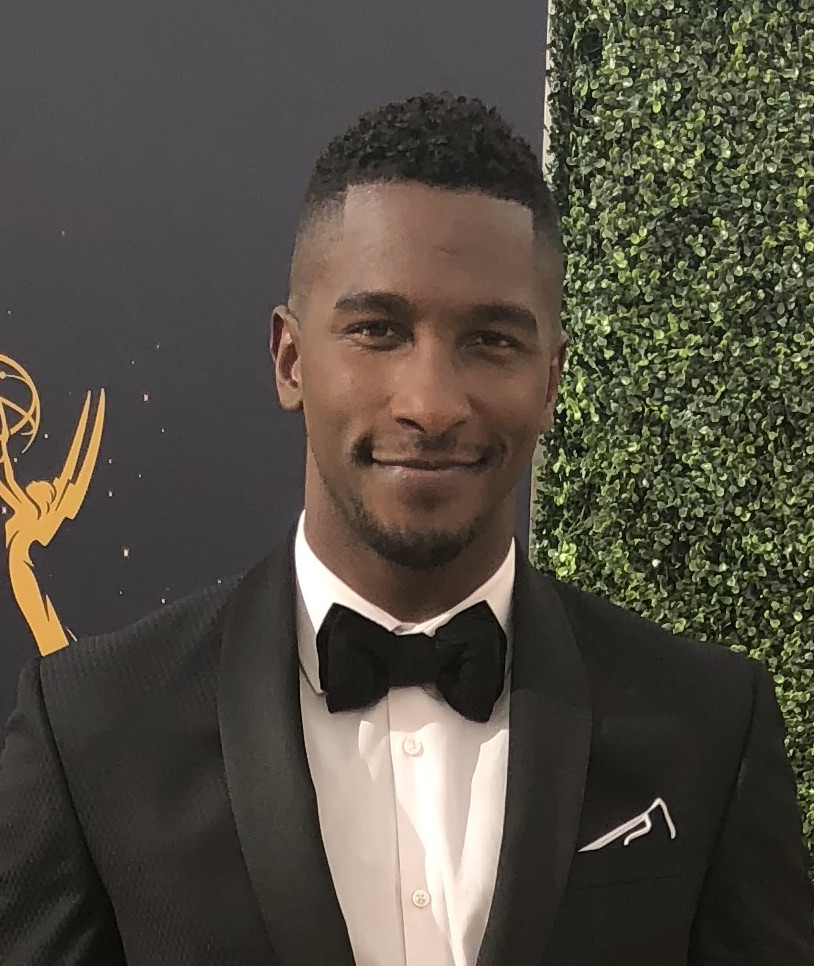
Scott Evans

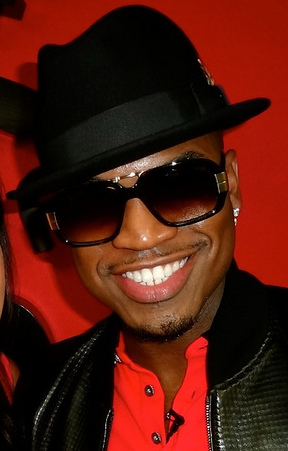
Ne-Yo

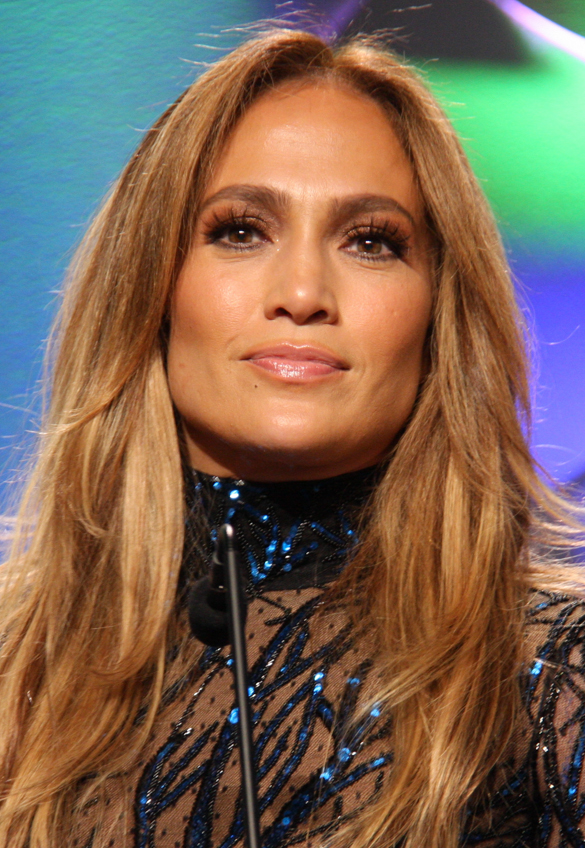
Jennifer Lopez

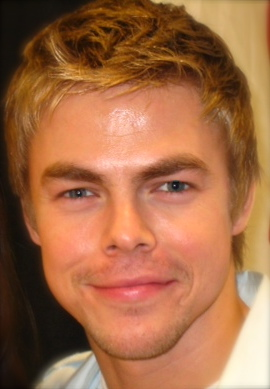
Derek Hough

Jennifer Lopez, Ne-Yo, and Derek Hough returned as the judges for their fourth consecutive seasons. Access Live co-host, Scott Evans returned as the host for a second consecutive season.

For the first time in show history there were no guest mentors at any stage of the competition.

== Dancers ==
Table key
Key	Description
	Contestant(s) came in first in the world final and won the competition
	Contestant(s) didn't win in the world final
	Contestant(s) has/have qualified for the semifinal but didn't make it to the world final
	Contestant(s) was/were chosen for redemption but did not make it to the semifinal
	Contestant(s) has/have qualified for the duels but didn't make it to the semifinal
	Contestant(s) did not advance in the callbacks
	Contestant(s) did not advance in the qualifiers
	Contestant(s) was/were given a callback vote in the qualifiers

=== Upper (18 and over) ===
Dance act	Hometown	Age	Dance style	Placement	Average score
Jefferson y Adrianita	Cali, Colombia	22/26	Salsa	World final (2nd place)	95.0
Geometrie Variable	Montpellier, France	29-31	Tutting	World final (3rd place)	93.7
Oxygen	Maastricht, Netherlands	16-27	Urban	World Final (4th place)	94.7
Jake & Chau	San Jose, California	18/20	Contemporary	Semifinalist	95.3
Kurtis Sprung	Caroga Lake, New York	26	Contemporary	Semifinals	90.3
UPeepz	Manila, Philippines	20-30	Hip-hop	Semifinals	89.0
Styles & Emma	Rochester, New York	17/19	Contemporary ballet	Redemption	–
Josh & Erica	Los Angeles, California	22/24	Urban	The duels	–
Luca & Alessandra	Sicily, Italy	31/32	Ballroom	The duels	–
The Rise	Gilbert, Arizona	17-26	Hip-hop	The duels	–
Show Stopper	Miami, Florida	–	Hip-hop	Callbacks	–
CBAction	Cordoba, Argentina	–	Hip-hop	Callbacks	–
Pumpfidence	Los Angeles, California	–	Heels	Callbacks	–
Avant Garde Collective	Amsterdam, Netherlands	–	Urban	Callbacks	–
The Williams Fam	Vallejo, California	–	Hip-hop	Qualifiers	–
Indigenous Enterprise	Phoenix, Arizona	–	Indigenous	Qualifiers	–

=== Junior (under 18) ===
Dance act	Hometown	Age	Dance style	Placement	Average score
MDC 3	Placentia, California	14-17	Contemporary	World final (winner)	96.2
Bailey & Kida	Orange County & Sacramento, California	15/17	Hip-hop	Semifinals	93.0
Keagan Capps	Moore, Oklahoma	13	Contemporary	Semifinals	90.7
The Young Cast	Levis, Canada	13-17	Hip-hop	Semifinals	90.7
Savannah Manzel	Lake Elmo, Minnesota	9	Jazz/contemporary	Semifinals	90.3
GRVMNT	Vancouver, Canada	11-17	Hip-hop	Semifinals	89.7
James & Harris	Seattle, Washington	16	Contemporary	Redemption	–
Chibi Unity	Niigata, Japan	13-17	Fusion	The duels	–
305	Miami, Florida	10-15	Latin ballroom	The duels	–
Maddy Penney	Mesa, Arizona	15	Ballet	The duels	–
Project 21	Yorba Linda, California	–	Jazz	Callbacks	–
The Difference	Carol Stream, Illinois	–	Contemporary	Callbacks	–
The Break Ninjaz	Las Vegas, Nevada	–	Breaking	Qualifiers	–
Gigabots	Vancouver, Canada	–	Popping	Qualifiers	–
Amari Smith	Las Vegas, Nevada	–	Hip-hop	Qualifiers	–
Willis	Bondy, France	–	Afro house	Qualifiers	–
Itty Bitty Crew	Edmonton, Canada	–	Hip-hop	Qualifiers	–
Antonio & Maria	Naples, Italy	–	Latin ballroom	Qualifiers	–

== The qualifiers ==
The qualifiers started on May 26, 2020. In season 4, the contestants need to get at least 2 yeses to advance to the duels instead of the judges scoring the points to the contestant. Contestants who are given a callback vote are given another chance to perform.

Table key
Key	Description
	Contestant(s) did not advance to the duels
	Contestant(s) did not advance straight to the duels, but was given a callback vote
	Judge voted yes
	Judge voted no
	Judge voted callback

Contestant performances and judges' votes
Date	Name	Division	Performance song	Judges' votes		
Date	Name	Division	Performance song	Ne-Yo	Lopez	D.Hough
May 26	Jefferson y Adrianita	Upper	"Dos Jueyes" – Celia Cruz			
May 26	grvmnt	Junior	"Dum-Dum" – Tedashii			
May 26	Jake & Chau	Upper	"Bruises" – Lewis Capaldi			
May 26	The Williams Fam	Upper	"Cartier" – Dopebwoy			
May 26	Bailey & Kida	Junior	"Off the Rip" – DaBaby			
May 26	Savannah Manzel	Junior	"River Deep, Mountain High" – Celine Dion			
June 2
June 2	The Rise	Upper	"6 Foot 7 Foot" – Lil Wayne			
June 2	Oxygen	Upper	"Lovely" – Billie Eilish			
June 2	Indigenous Enterprise	Upper	"Indian City/The Ripper" – Tribe Called Red/Northern Cree			
June 2	James & Harris	Junior	"Moment of Silence" – Lucidious			
June 2	305	Junior	"Adrenaline" – DJ Mendez			
June 2	Luca & Alessandra	Upper	"A Evaristo Carriego" – Metropole			
June 2	UPeepz	Upper	"Get Back" – Ludacris			
June 2	Styles & Emma	Upper	"When the Party's Over" – Billie Eilish			
June 9	Keagan Capps	Junior	"Zombie" – Gabriella			
June 9	Antonio and Maria	Junior	–			
June 9	Avant Garde Collective	Upper	–			
June 9	Chibi Unity	Junior	"Some Nights" – Fun.			
June 9	Josh & Erica	Upper	"Mount Everest" – Labrinth			
June 9	The Break Ninjaz	Junior	"Beggin" – Frankie Valli and the Four Seasons			
June 9	The Young Cast	Junior	"We Run This" – Missy Elliott			
June 9	MDC 3	Junior	"Apologize" – OneRepublic			
June 9	Show Stopper	Upper	"Que Calor" – Major Lazer			
June 16	Géométrie Variable	Upper	"Habits" – Tove Lo			
June 16	Gigabots	Junior	"Funkin' on the One" – Ozone			
June 16	Maddy Penney	Junior	"Lonely" – Noah Cyrus			
June 16	CBAction	Upper	"Boom Boom Boom Boom" – Vengaboys			
June 16	The Difference	Junior	–			
June 16	Itty Bitty Crew	Junior	–			
June 16	Amari Smith	Junior	–			
June 16	Pumpfidence	Upper	–			
June 16	Willis	Junior	–			
June 16	Project 21	Junior	"Rich Girl" – Gwen Stefani			
June 16	Kurtis Sprung	Upper	"Torches" – X Ambassadors			

== The callbacks ==
The callbacks occurred on June 23, 2020. The 10 callbacks performed for one of the four spots to head to the duels.

Table key
Key	Description
	Contestant(s) did not advance to the duels
	Judge voted yes
	Judge voted no

Contestant performances and judges' votes
Date	Name	Division	Performance song	Judges' votes
June 23	The Rise	Upper Division	"OMG" – Usher	
June 23	Project 21	Junior Division	"Boys" – Lizzo	
June 23	Avant Garde Collective	Upper Division	"Summer Presto" – Vivaldi	
June 23	CBAction	Upper Division	–	
June 23	The Difference	Junior Division	–	
June 23	grvmnt	Junior Division	"Outta Your Mind" – Lil Jon	
June 23	Pumpfidence	Upper Division	"Love Don't Cost a Thing" – Jennifer Lopez	
June 23	Show Stopper	Upper Division	"16 Shots" – Stefflon Don	
June 23	305	Junior Division	Pica	
June 23	The Young Cast	Junior Division	"Children" – Justin Bieber	

== The duels ==
In the duels, contestants no longer chose their own opponents in this season; this was done by the judges and revealed at the last moment. A guest judge selection the competitors for the head-to-head redemption duels.

Oxygen defeated Styles & Emma in the upper redemption duel to advance. The Young Cast defeated James and Harris in the junior redemption duel to advance.

Table key
Key	Description	Key	Description	Key	Description	Key	Description
	Contestant(s) was/were eliminated by a duel		Contestant(s) lost their duel, but won a redemption duel, advancing them to the semifinals.		Judges passed contestant through the qualifiers, and the act advanced straight to the duels.		Judges voted for a callback, during which one of four acts is selected to advance to the duels.

Qualifying acts
Upper	Overall decision	Junior	Overall decision
Jefferson y Adrianita		Bailey & Kida	
Jake & Chau		Savannah Manzel	
Oxygen		James & Harris	
Luca & Alessandra		Keagan Capps	
UPeepz		Chibi Unity	
Styles & Emma		MDC 3	
Géométrie Variable		Maddy Penney	
Kurtis Sprung		grvmnt	
Josh & Erica		305	
The Rise		The Young Cast	

Contestant performances and judges' scores
Division	Date	Name	Performance song	Ne-Yo	Lopez	D.Hough				
Division	Date	Name	Performance song	Upper	June 30	Jefferson y Adrianita	"El Rey Del Timbal" – Tito Puente	YES	YES	YES
Luca & Alessandra	"Drop" – Diplo	NO	NO	Upper	June 30	NO				
UPeepz	"Hotel Room Service" – Pitbull	NO	YES	Upper	June 30	YES				
The Rise	"Don't Cha" – The Pussycat Dolls	YES	NO	Upper	June 30	NO				
Kurtis Sprung	Bad" – James Bay	YES	YES	Upper	June 30	NO				
Styles & Emma	"Someone You Loved" – Lewis Capaldi	NO	NO	Upper	June 30	YES				
July 14	Jake & Chau	"Chainsmoking" – Jacob Banks	YES	Upper	YES	NO				
July 14	Josh & Erica	"Bury a Friend" – Billie Eilish	NO	Upper	NO	YES				
July 14	Géométrie Variable	"Never Be Like You" – Flume	YES	Upper	YES	YES				
July 14	Oxygen	"Get Up Offa That Thing" – James Brown	NO	Upper	NO	NO				
Junior	July 21	grvmnt	"Godzilla" – Eminem	YES	YES	NO				
Junior	July 21	The Young Cast	"Come Thru" – DMX	NO	NO	YES				
Junior	July 21	305	"Confident" – Demi Lovato	NO	NO	NO				
Junior	July 21	Savannah Manzel	"Soldier" – Fleurie	YES	YES	YES				
Junior	July 21	Chibi Unity	"Uproar" – Lil Wayne	YES	NO	NO				
Junior	July 21	MDC 3	"Never Again" – Kelly Clarkson	NO	YES	YES				
Junior	July 28	Bailey and Kida	"Isis" – Joyner Lucas	YES	NO	YES				
Junior	July 28	James & Harris	"Let Me Go" – NF	NO	YES	NO				
Junior	July 28	Keagan Capps	"Heart of Glass" – Blondie & Philip Glass	YES	YES	YES				
Junior	July 28	Maddy Penney	"Maintenant" – Rupa & The April Fishes	NO	NO	NO				

== Redemption ==
Contestant performances and judges' scores
Division	Advanced	Performance song	Eliminated	Performance song					
Division	Advanced	Performance song	Eliminated	Performance song	Upper	Oxygen	"Santa Maria" – The Gotan Project	Styles & Emma	"Weight in Gold" – Gallant
Junior	The Young Cast	"Super Bad, Super Slick" – James Brown	James & Harris	"Circles" – Post Malone					

== Semifinals ==
In the semifinals, 6 acts per episode compete for 2 spots in the world final. In each episode, there are 3 upper division and 3 junior division acts.

For the first time, the acts were performed on the World of Dance stage. The scoring system was also returned in this round.

Table key
Key	Description	Key	Description	Key	Description	Key	Description
	Contestant(s) placed first in their semifinal Week, advancing them to the world final		Contestant(s) placed second in their semifinal Week, advancing them to the world final.		Contestant(s) placed third in their semifinal Week, eliminating them from the competition.		Contestant(s) placed fourth, fifth, or sixth in their semifinal week.

Duel results
Upper	Votes	Overall semifinal rank	Junior	Votes	Overall semifinal rank
Jefferson y Adrianita	3	4	Keagan Capps	3	7
Géométrie Variable	3	5	Savannah Manzel	3	9
Jake & Chau	2	3	Bailey & Kida	2	6
UPeepz	2	12	GRVMNT	2	11
Kurtis Sprung	2	9	MDC 3	2	1
Oxygen	0	2	The Young Cast	1	7

Contestant performances and judges' scores
Date	Name	Performance song	Judges' score			
Date	Name	Performance song	Ne-Yo	Jennifer	Derek	Average
August 4
August 4	The Young Cast	"Bohemian Rhapsody" – David Garrett & Panic! at the Disco	89	90	93	90.7
August 4	Savannah Manzel	"Dreamweaver" – J2	89	91	91	90.3
August 4	Jefferson y Adrianita	"Oh Mayi" – Ricky Campanelli	92	95	96	94.3
August 4	grvmnt	"Tear Da Roof Off" – Busta Rhymes	89	89	91	89.7
August 4	Kurtis Sprung	"Monsters" – James Blunt	89	92	90	90.3
August 4	Géométrie Variable	"Tessellate" – Ellie Goulding	95	94	93	94.0
August 11
August 11	Keagan Capps	"Bring Me to Life" – Evanescence	90	90	92	90.7
August 11	Upeepz	"Bebot" – Black Eyed Peas	89	88	90	89.0
August 11	Jake & Chau	"Say You Love Me" – Jessie Ware	96	95	95	95.3
August 11	Bailey & Kida	"Momma I Hit a Lick" – 2 Chainz ft. Kendrick Lamar	92	95	92	93.0
August 11	Oxygen	"Toccata" – J.S. Bach	98	97	94	96.3
August 11	MDC 3	"This Woman's Work" – Maxwell	94	98	98	96.7

== World final ==
The world final was taped without the studio audience due to the COVID-19 pandemic.

Contestant performances and judges' scores
Date	Name	Performance song	Judges' scores			
Date	Name	Performance song	Ne-Yo	Jennifer	Derek	Average
August 12	Oxygen	"Sail" – Awolnation	94	91	94	93.0
August 12	MDC 3	"I Surrender" – Celine Dion	95	95	97	95.7
August 12	Jefferson y Adrianita	"Celia y Tito" – Celia Cruz and Tito Puente	94	96	96	95.3
August 12	Géométrie Variable	"You Know You Like It" – AlunaGeorge & DJ Snake	94	92	94	93.3

Table key
Key	Description
	Contestant won the competition
	Contestant placed 2nd
	Contestant placed 3rd
	Contestant placed 4th

The Final scores
Upper		Junior		Upper		Upper	
Name	Score	Name	Score	Name	Score	Name	Score
Oxygen	93.0	MDC 3	95.7	Jefferson y Adrianita	95.3	Géométrie Variable	93.3

== Highest-scoring dances ==
Dance act	Division	Round	Song	Score	Ne-Yo	Jennifer	Derek
MDC 3	Junior	Semifinals	"This Woman's Work" – Maxwell	96.7	94	98	98
Oxygen	Upper	Semifinals	"Toccata" – J.S. Bach	96.3	98	97	94
MDC 3	Junior	World Finals	"I Surrender" – Celine Dion	95.7	95	95	97
Jefferson y Adrianita	Upper	World finals	"Celia y Tito" – Celia Cruz and Tito Puente	95.3	94	96	96
Jake & Chau	Upper	Semifinals	"Say You Love Me" – Jessie Ware	95.3	96	95	95

== Ratings ==
Viewership and ratings per episode of World of Dance season 4
No.	Title	Air date	Rating/share (18–49)	Viewers (millions)	DVR (18–49)	DVR viewers (millions)	Total (18–49)	Total viewers (millions)	Ref.
1	"The Qualifiers 1"	May 26, 2020	1.0/6	5.00	0.4	1.70	1.4	6.70	
2	"The Qualifiers 2"	June 2, 2020	0.8/5	4.25	0.4	1.59	1.3	5.84	
3	"The Qualifiers 3"	June 9, 2020	0.8/5	4.34	0.4	1.52	1.2	5.86	
4	"The Qualifiers 4"	June 16, 2020	0.9/5	4.16	0.5	1.71	1.3	5.87	
5	"The Callbacks"	June 23, 2020	0.8/5	4.10	0.4	1.53	1.2	5.64	
6	"The Duels 1"	June 30, 2020	0.8/5	4.00	0.4	1.58	1.2	5.58	
7	"The Duels 2"	July 14, 2020	0.7/5	3.75	0.4	1.54	1.1	5.29	
8	"The Duels 3"	July 21, 2020	0.5/4	3.28	0.4	1.51	0.9	4.79	
9	"The Duels 4"	July 28, 2020	0.7/4	3.59	0.4	1.63	1.1	5.22	
10	"The Semi-Finals 1"	August 4, 2020	0.7/5	3.80	0.4	1.48	1.1	5.28	
11	"The Semi-Finals 2"	August 11, 2020	0.6/4	3.77	0.4	1.39	1.0	5.15	
12	"The World Final"	August 12, 2020	0.6/4	4.08	0.3	1.28	0.9	5.36	
