= World of Dance season 3 =

World of Dance
- Season 3
- Hosted by: Scott Evans
- Judges: Ne-Yo; Jennifer Lopez; Derek Hough
- Winner: Kings United
- Runner-up: Unity LA (Wildcard)

Release
- Original network: NBC
- Original release: February 26 – May 5, 2019

Season chronology
- ← Previous; Season 2 Next → Season 4

The third season of American reality competition television series World of Dance premiered on February 26, 2019, on NBC. Ne-Yo, and Derek Hough returned as the judges for their third consecutive seasons. Access Hollywood co-host Scott Evans replaced Jenna Dewan as the new host.

== Production ==
=== Format changes ===
The required qualifier score to enter the duels increased from 80 to 85. The duels feature a redemption round where the Top 2 eliminated acts (in each division) with the highest score compete head to head for a second chance to advance to The Cuts. In the redemption, the 2 acts compete back to back to the same music. Afterwards, the judges vote to decide which act will advance.

In the Divisional Final, the judges pick one more act to advance to the World Final as a wild card. In the World Final, each act performs once instead of twice.

The guest judge is removed this season.

=== Show concept ===
In preparation for season three, handpicked competitors, being talented in any styles of dancing, from qualifying events around the nation and thousands of online submissions, are divided into four divisions:

1. Junior (groups of 1-4, under 18),
2. Upper (groups of 1-4, 18 and older),
3. Junior Team (groups of 5+, under 18) and
4. Upper Team (groups of 5+, 18 and older).

In some cases dancers who didn't apply were directly contacted by the producers or their agents.

=== Scoring ===
The judges are scoring in 5 categories. Each category is worth 20 points, with a perfect score of 100:

- Performance (20 points): :)
  - Effort: How many different elements put into the routine without overloading or rushing through it. What was the whole effort to dance the performance by the act.
  - Personality: How characters and personality put into the performance, in the sense of acting to stimulate emotions by the audience, telling a story or framing pictures.
- Technique (20 points):
  - Transitions: How smooth and elegant the transitions from move to move were without lacking a performance moment.
  - Cleanness: How synchronized, ordered by a pattern, precise and committed the movements were within the act.
  - Execution: How flawless the execution of the performance by the act was to the performance song.
- Choreography (20 points):
  - Difficulty: How difficult it was to perform the figures and movements by the act from judges point of view.
  - Musicality: How well pictures, figures and movements were choreographed to the sound and beat of the performance song.
  - Tricks: Are unexpected show elements included by properties, clothing or the bodies of the dancers and how well was it done.
- Creativity (20 points):
  - Originality: How unique, new, fresh and interesting was the performance.
  - Artistic Choices: What styles of dancing were shown and merged. How well was it done regarding basic dance styles and style culture, e.g. costumes, shoes. The performance song and the use of properties are artistic choices as well. How well did they fit to the performance.
  - Dynamics: How energizing and powerful the performance was and how much action was on stage.
- Presentation (20 points):
  - Crowd Appeal: How the crowd around the show stage reacted to the performance.
  - Impact: How memorable, influential and worth talking about it later the performance was.

== Judges, host, and mentors ==
Season 3 host and judges

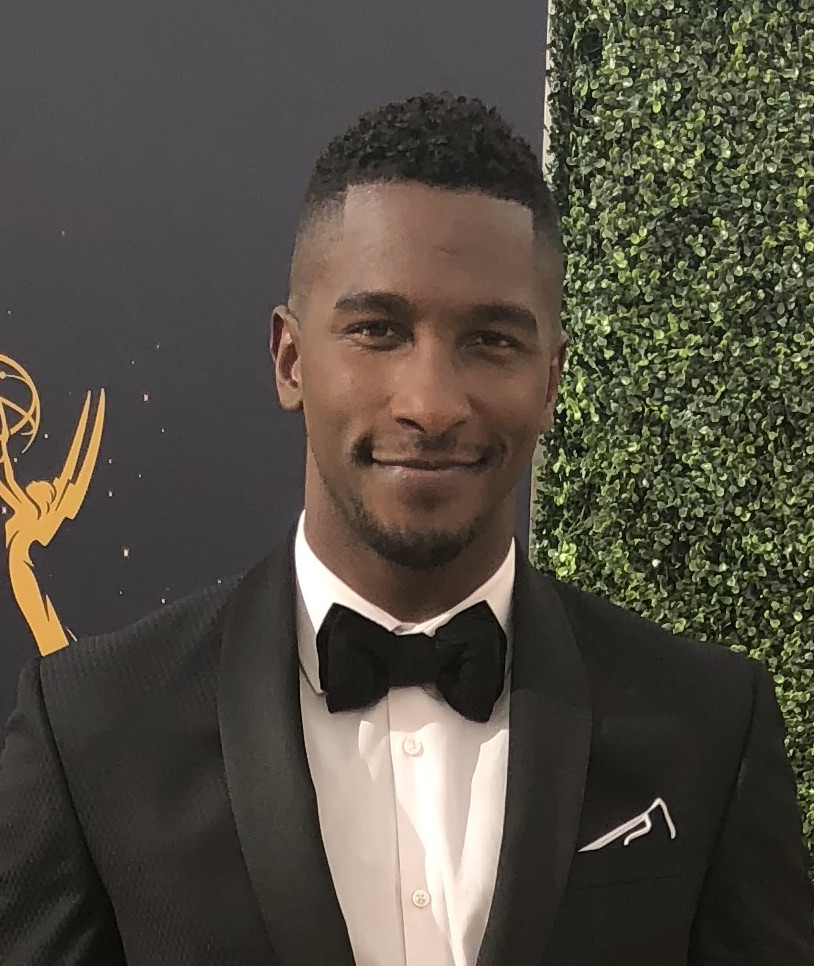
Scott Evans

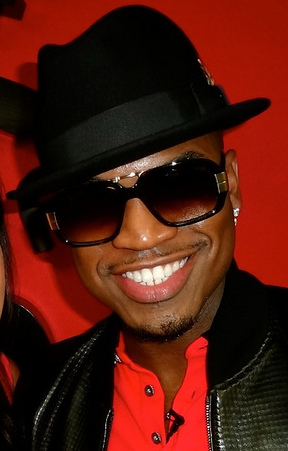
Ne-Yo

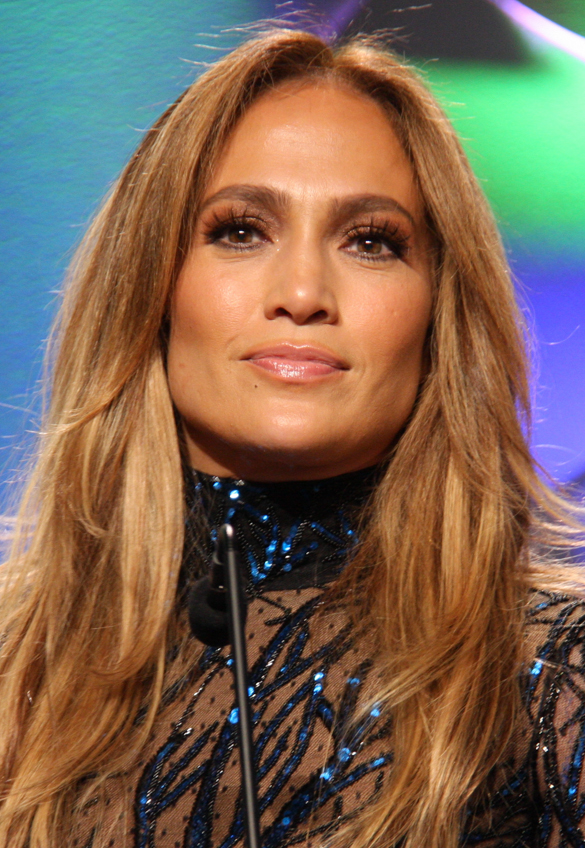
Jennifer Lopez

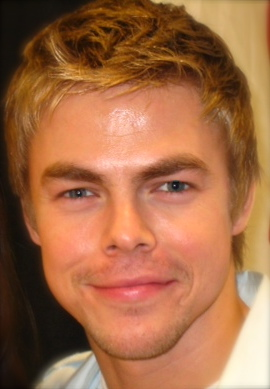
Derek Hough

Jennifer Lopez, Ne-Yo, and Derek Hough returned as the judges for their third consecutive season. Access Live co-host, Scott Evans replaced original presenter Jenna Dewan as the host for the third season. Evans became the first male host of the show and the first host/judge to be on the show with no prior dancing experience.

This season there were only two mentors in two different rounds. Original host Jenna Dewan, returned as a mentor for the Junior teams in the round of The Cut. Hip hop dancer, choreographer, entertainer, and former So You Think You Can Dance contestant, Stephen "tWitch" Boss served as a mentor for the Divisional Final round.

== Dancers ==
Junior Team (under 18)
| Act | Hometown | Dance Style | Qualifier Score | Duel Score | Cut Score | Divisional Final Score | World Final Score | Average Score | Elimination Date | Placement |
|---|---|---|---|---|---|---|---|---|---|---|
| VPeepz | Manila, Philippines | Hip-Hop | 90.3 | 92.7 | 98.7 | 96.0 | 93.7 | 94.2 | - | 4th Place |
| Dancetown Divas | Miami, FL | Latin Ballroom | 87.3 | 95.0 | 93.3 | 95.7 | | 92.8 | April 28, 2019 | Divisional Final |
| The Crazy 8's | Anaheim Hills, CA | Contemporary | 93.0 | 93.3 | 92.3 | 93.0 | | 92.9 | April 28, 2019 | Divisional Final |
| JDC | San Jose, CA | Contemporary | 87.3 | 96.0 | 91.3 | - | | 91.7 | April 14, 2019 | The Cut |
| Elektro Crew | Gilbert, AZ | Hip-Hop | 86.3 | 91.0 | 90.0 | - | | 89.1 | April 14, 2019 | The Cut |
| Get Down District | Rosemead, CA | Whacking | 85.0 | 88.0 | 88.7 | - | | 87.2 | April 14, 2019 | The Cut |
| MKAM | Alhambra, CA | Hip-Hop | 89.7 | 90.7 | - | - | | 90.2 | March 24, 2019 | The Duels |
| Battle Droids Crew | Antwerp, Belgium | Breaking | 87.0 | 90.3 | - | - | | 88.7 | March 24, 2019 | The Duels |
| West Springfield Dance | Springfield, VA | Hip-Hop | 85.0 | 89.3 | - | - | | 87.2 | March 24, 2019 | The Duels |
| Intention | Edmond, OK | Contemporary | 87.7 | 87.0 | - | - | | 87.4 | March 24, 2019 | The Duels |
| Movement Society | Calgary, Canada | Contemporary | 84.7 | - | - | - | | 84.7 | March 3, 2019 | Qualifiers |
| Femp3 | San Diego, CA | Hip Hop | 84.7 | - | - | - | | 84.7 | March 3, 2019 | Qualifiers |
| Kozmic Edge | Guttenberg, NJ | Hip Hop | 83.0 | - | - | - | | 83.0 | March 10, 2019 | Qualifiers |
| Apprentice | Vancouver, Canada | | 83.7 | - | - | - | | 83.7 | March 10, 2019 | Qualifiers |
| Minibots | Vancouver, Canada | Popping | 83.3 | - | - | - | | 83.3 | February 26, 2019 | Qualifiers |

Upper Team (over 18)
| Act | Hometown | Dance Style | Qualifier Score | Duel Score | Cut Score | Divisional Final Score | World Final Score | Average Score | Elimination Date | Placement |
|---|---|---|---|---|---|---|---|---|---|---|
| Kings United | Mumbai, India | Hip-Hop | 97.7 | 99.3 | 97.7 | 99.7 | 100.0 | 98.88 | - | 1st place |
| Unity LA | Los Angeles, CA | Contemporary | 95.3 | 97.0 | 93.3 | 98.7 | 95.7 | 96.0 | - | 2nd Place |
| The Heima | Seoul, South Korea | Breaking | 93.7 | 96.7 | 97.7 | 93.3 | | 95.3 | April 28, 2019 | Divisional Final |
| Radiance | Los Angeles, CA | Contemporary | 88.0 | 93.7 | 92.7 | - | | 90.9 | April 21, 2019 | The Cut |
| Exiles | Coolidge, AZ | Hip-Hop | 88.0 | 93.0 | 90.3 | - | | 90.4 | April 21, 2019 | The Cut |
| Fuego Dance Crew | San Diego, CA | Hip-Hop | 93.7 | 91.0 | 89.3 | - | | 91.3 | April 21, 2019 | The Cut |
| Motiv Crew | Orlando, FL | Hip-Hop | 85.7 | 90.0 | - | - | | 87.9 | April 7, 2019 | Duels |
| Siudy Flamenco | Miami, FL | Flamenco | 86.7 | 89.7 | - | - | | 88.2 | April 7, 2019 | Duels |
| Main Guys | Oslo, Norway | Hip-Hop | 89.7 | 89.3 | - | - | | 89.5 | April 7, 2019 | Duels |
| Style & Grace | Vancouver, Canada | Hip-Hop | 85.0 | 88.0 | - | - | | 86.5 | April 7, 2019 | Duels |
| Guests of Honor | Los Angeles, CA | Hip-Hop | 84.3 | - | - | - | | 84.3 | March 3, 2019 | Qualifiers |
| Str8jacket | San Mateo, CA | Hip-Hop | 83.7 | - | - | - | | 83.7 | March 10, 2019 | Qualifiers |
| The Rookies | Nantes, France | | 83.0 | - | - | - | | 83.0 | March 10, 2019 | Qualifiers |

Upper (over 18)
| Act | Hometown | Dance Style | Qualifier Score | Duel Score | Cut Score | Divisional Final Score | World Final Score | Average Score | Elimination Date | Placement |
|---|---|---|---|---|---|---|---|---|---|---|
| Briar Nolet | Oakville, Canada | Contemporary | 87.3 | 90.3 | 95.3 | 95.3 | 92.7 | 92.1 | - | 5th Place |
| Poppin John | Farmington, NM | Popping | 85.3 | 91.3 | 95.0 | 95.0 | | 91.6 | April 28, 2019 | Divisional Final |
| Derion & Madison | Los Angeles, CA | Contemporary | 90.3 | 90.0 | 94.7 | 92.0 | | 91.7 | April 28, 2019 | Divisional Final |
| All Ready | Seoul, South Korea | Hip-hop/Ballroom fusion | 88.0 | 92.3 | 92.0 | - | | 90.7 | April 14, 2019 | The Cut |
| D'Angelo Brothers | San Cesareo, Italy | Tap | 87.3 | 89.7 | 91.7 | - | | 89.5 | April 14, 2019 | The Cut |
| Jonathan Y Jorge | Orlando, Florida & Lima, Peru | Salsa | 88.7 | 90.7 | 90.7 | - | | 90.0 | April 14, 2019 | The Cut |
| Denise & Josh | Toronto, Canada | Contemporary | 91.0 | 90.0 | - | - | | 90.5 | March 17, 2019 | The Duels |
| Derek Piquette | Chicopee, MA | Contemporary | 91.3 | 89.3 | - | - | | 90.3 | March 17, 2019 | The Duels |
| DD Flection | Bangkok, Thailand | Contemporary | 92.0 | 89.0 | - | - | | 90.5 | March 17, 2019 | The Duels |
| Tobias & The Eztwins | Copenhagen, Denmark & Ljubljana, Slovenia | Hip-Hop | 92.7 | 87.3 | - | - | | 90.0 | March 17, 2019 | The Duels |
| Erica & Aiden | Los Angeles, CA | Contemporary | 84.7 | - | - | - | | 84.7 | February 26, 2019 | Qualifiers |
| Alyen & Maria | Cincinnati, OH | Contemporary | 84.3 | - | - | - | | 84.3 | February 26, 2019 | Qualifiers |
| Skyscrape | Norfolk, VA & Dortmund, Germany | Ballet | 83.7 | - | - | - | | 83.7 | March 10, 2019 | Qualifiers |

Junior (under 18)
| Act | Hometown | Dance Style | Qualifier Score | Duel Score | Cut Score | Divisional Final Score | World Final Score | Average Score | Elimination Date | Placement |
|---|---|---|---|---|---|---|---|---|---|---|
| Ellie & Ava | Woodbury, MN | Contemporary | 92.3 | 91.7 | 95.3 | 96.0 | 95.0 | 94.0 | - | 3rd Place |
| Julian & Charlize | Manalapan, NJ & Los Angeles, CA | Hip-Hop | 87.0 | 95.3 | 93.0 | 95.7 | | 92.7 | April 28, 2019 | Divisional Final |
| Kayla Mak | Rye Brook, NY | Contemporary Ballet | 90.3 | 91.0 | 93.7 | 95.3 | | 92.5 | April 28, 2019 | Divisional Final |
| Lauren Yakima | Northville, MI | Contemporary | 95.7 | 96.0 | 91.7 | | | 94.4 | April 21, 2019 | The Cut |
| Funkanometry | Vancouver Island, Canada | Popping | 87.3 | 91.7 | 91.3 | | | 90.1 | April 21, 2019 | The Cut |
| Moving 4ward | Toronto, Canada | Contemporary | 86.3 | 93.0 | 90.3 | | | 89.8 | April 21, 2019 | The Cut |
| House of Tap | Santa Ana, CA & San Diego, CA | Tap | 85.7 | 91.3 | - | | | 88.5 | March 31, 2019 | The Duels |
| Aydin Eyikan | Fairfield, CT | Contemporary | 88.3 | 90.3 | - | | | 89.3 | March 31, 2019 | The Duels |
| The Trilogy | Maplewood, MN | Contemporary | 86.3 | 90.0 | - | | | 88.2 | March 31, 2019 | The Duels |
| Audrey & Mia | Chicago, Illinois & Seattle, Washington | Krump | 86.3 | 90.0 | - | | | 88.2 | March 31, 2019 | The Duels |
| Mya Walters | Peozia, AZ | Contemporary | 83.3 | - | - | | | 83.3 | February 26, 2019 | Qualifiers |
| Ethan & Anastasia | New York, NY | | 84.3 | - | - | | | 84.3 | March 3, 2019 | Qualifiers |
| Invictus | Seattle, WA | Ballroom | 82.0 | - | - | | | 82.0 | March 10, 2019 | Qualifiers |

== The Qualifiers ==
The qualifier round took place between February 26 and March 10, 2019. In season 3, the number of points you need to advance to The Duels is now 85. While seasons 1 and 2, the average points was 80. The qualifier round got harder to get past. Some people from last season would not make it this season.

3Table key
| Key | Description |
|---|---|
| | Contestant(s) did not advance to The Duels |

Contestant performances and Judges' score
| Date | Name | Division | Performance song | Judges' score | | | |
| Date | Name | Division | Performance song | Ne-Yo | Jennifer | Derek | Average |
|---|---|---|---|---|---|---|---|
| February 26 | Kings United | Upper Team | "Dhakka Laga Bukka Yuva" - A.R Rahman, Karthik, & Mehboob | 97 | 98 | 98 | 97.7 |
| February 26 | Erica & Aiden | Upper | "Better Now" - Post Malone | 84 | 85 | 85 | 84.7 |
| February 26 | Funkanometry | Junior | "Shake Your Pants" - Cameo | 88 | 87 | 87 | 87.3 |
| February 26 | The Crazy 8's | Junior Team | "Keeping Your Head Up" - Birdy (Don Diablo remix) | 93 | 95 | 91 | 93.0 |
| February 26 | Alyen & Maria | Upper | | 84 | 85 | 84 | 84.3 |
| February 26 | Jonathan y Jorge | Upper | "El Anillo" - Jennifer Lopez | 90 | 87 | 89 | 88.7 |
| February 26 | Julian and Charlize | Junior | "The Middle" - Zedd, Maren Morris, Grey | 87 | 88 | 86 | 87.0 |
| February 26 | The Heima | Upper Team | "La La La" - Naughty Boy (ft. Sam Smith) | 95 | 92 | 94 | 93.7 |
| February 26 | Minibots | Junior Team | "I Can Make Ya" - Fingazz | 85 | 83 | 82 | 83.3 |
| February 26 | Poppin John | Upper | "Flower Duet" - Lakmé | 84 | 86 | 86 | 85.3 |
| February 26 | Get Down District | Junior Team | “Wannabe” - Spice Girls | | | | 85.0 |
| February 26 | West Springfield Dance | Junior Team | “It's Me Snitches” - Swizz Beats | | | | 85.0 |
| February 26 | Mya Walters | Junior | “My My My” - Troye Sivan | 84 | 84 | 82 | 83.3 |
| February 26 | Ellie & Ava | Junior | "Cry Pretty" - Carrie Underwood | 95 | 89 | 93 | 92.3 |
| February 26 | D'Angelo Brothers | Upper | "People Get Up And Drive Your Funky Soul" - James Brown | 87 | 86 | 89 | 87.3 |
| February 26 | Lauren Yakima | Junior | "(I Just) Died in Your Arms" - Hidden Citizens | 97 | 94 | 96 | 95.7 |
| February 26 | Elektro Crew | Junior Team | "Yeah!" - Usher (ft. Lil Jon & Ludacris) | 87 | 87 | 85 | 86.3 |
| March 3 | Kayla Mak | Junior | "Back To Me" - Daya | 92 | 87 | 92 | 90.3 |
| March 3 | Fuego Dance Crew | Upper Team | "Chambea" - Bad Bunny | 92 | 95 | 94 | 93.7 |
| March 3 | Motiv Crew | Upper Team | “Everybody Mad” - O.T. Genesis | | | | 85.7 |
| March 3 | JDC | Junior Team | "Look" - Leikeli47 | | | | 87.3 |
| March 3 | Ethan & Anastasia | Junior | “Love Me Like You Do” - Ellie Goulding | | | | 84.3 |
| March 3 | Aydin Eyikan | Junior | "In My Blood" - Shawn Mendes | 89 | 87 | 89 | 88.3 |
| March 3 | All Ready | Upper | "Perhaps, Perhaps, Perhaps" - The Pussycat Dolls | 89 | 90 | 85 | 88.0 |
| March 3 | Guests of Honor | Upper Team | | | | | 84.3 |
| March 3 | Exiles | Upper Team | "The Saints" - Andy Mineo | 88 | 87 | 89 | 88.0 |
| March 3 | Briar Nolet | Upper | "You Should See Me in a Crown" - Billie Eilish | 88 | 86 | 88 | 87.3 |
| March 3 | VPeepz | Junior Team | ”How Low" - Ludacris | 89 | 89 | 93 | 90.3 |
| March 3 | Movement Society | Junior Team | | | | | 84.7 |
| March 3 | Derion & Madison | Upper | "Genius" - LSD | 89 | 92 | 90 | 90.3 |
| March 3 | Moving 4ward | Junior | "Hold Back the River" - James Bay | 86 | 86 | 87 | 86.3 |
| March 3 | Femp3 | Junior | | | | | 84.7 |
| March 3 | Dancetown Divas | Junior Team | "La Mordidita" - Ricky Martin (ft. Yotuel) | 87 | 88 | 87 | 87.3 |
| March 3 | Tobias & The EZTwins | Upper | "For You" - Ramzoid | 94 | 92 | 92 | 92.7 |
| March 3 | The Trilogy | Junior | "You Say" - Lauren Daigle | 87 | 85 | 87 | 86.3 |
| March 10 | MKAM | Junior Team | "What You Gon' Do" - Lil Jon & The East Side Boyz (ft. Lil Scrappy) | 88 | 89 | 92 | 89.7 |
| March 10 | Denise & Josh | Upper | "An Evening I Will Not Forget" - Dermot Kennedy | 90 | 92 | 91 | 91.0 |
| March 10 | Invictus | Junior | "New Rules" - Dua Lipa | | | | 82.0 |
| March 10 | The Rookies | Upper Team | "Poison" - Bell Biv Devoe | | | | 83.0 |
| March 10 | Main Guys | Upper Team | "Taste" - Tyga (ft. Offset) | 89 | 89 | 91 | 89.7 |
| March 10 | Kozmic Edge | Junior Team | "All The Way Up" - Fat Joe & Remy Ma (ft. French Montana) | 83 | 83 | 83 | 83.0 |
| March 10 | Unity LA | Upper Team | "Indestructible" - Robyn | 97 | 94 | 95 | 95.3 |
| March 10 | Str8jacket | Upper Team | "Wall To Wall" - Chris Brown | | | | 83.7 |
| March 10 | Battle Droids Crew | Junior Team | "The Power" - Snap! | 85 | 87 | 89 | 87.0 |
| March 10 | Intention | Junior Team | "Piano Man" - Billy Joel | 88 | 88 | 87 | 87.7 |
| March 10 | Skyscrape | Upper | “Unfaithful” - Rihanna / Concerto Of Beethoven | 86 | 84 | 81 | 83.7 |
| March 10 | Derek Piquette | Upper | "Remember Who I Was" - James Arthur | 90 | 93 | 91 | 91.3 |
| March 10 | Audrey & Mia | Junior | "Alive" - Lil Jon, Offset & 2 Chainz | 87 | 87 | 85 | 86.3 |
| March 10 | House of Tap | Junior | "One Day" - Logic (ft. Ryan Tedder) | 85 | 86 | 86 | 85.7 |
| March 10 | DD Flection | Upper | "Die Trying" - Michl | 90 | 95 | 91 | 92.0 |
| March 10 | Siudy Flamenco | Upper Team | "My Immortal" - Evanescence | 87 | 88 | 85 | 86.7 |
| March 10 | Apprentice | Junior Team | | | | | 83.7 |
| March 10 | Style & Grace | Upper Team | "Goodies" - Ciara | 87 | 85 | 83 | 85.0 |
| March 10 | Radiance | Upper Team | "Closure" - Hayley Warner | 87 | 87 | 90 | 88.0 |

== The Duels ==
In each round of The Duels, two acts in the same division compete for a spot in The Cut. In each division, the acts with the top scores choose their opponents, then both acts perform back-to-back, receiving feedback from the judges. The act with the higher score moves on to The Cut; the other faces immediate elimination. New in season 3, at the end of each division, the 2 highest scoring eliminated acts will face off in Redemption. The 2 acts will dance to the same song back to back and the judges will decide who will take the last remaining spot in The Cut by majority vote.

Table key
| Key | Description | Key | Description |
|---|---|---|---|
| | Contestant(s) was/were eliminated by a duel | | Contestant lost their Duel, but won a Redemption Duel, advancing them to the Cut. |

The Qualifiers scores
| Rank | Upper | | Upper Team | | Junior | | Junior Team | |
| Rank | Name | Score | Name | Score | Name | Score | Name | Score |
|---|---|---|---|---|---|---|---|---|
| 1st | Tobias & The EZTwins | 92.7 | Kings United | 97.7 | Lauren Yakima | 95.7 | Crazy 8's | 93.0 |
| 2nd | DD Flection | 92.0 | Unity LA | 95.3 | Ellie & Ava | 92.3 | VPeepz | 90.3 |
| 3rd | Derek Piquette | 91.3 | Fuego Dance Crew | 93.7 | Kayla Mak | 90.3 | MKAM | 89.7 |
| 4th | Denise & Josh | 91.0 | The Heima | 93.7 | Aydin Eykin | 88.3 | Intention | 87.7 |
| 5th | Derion & Madison | 90.3 | Main Guys | 89.7 | Funkanometry | 87.3 | Dancetown Divas | 87.3 |
| 6th | Jonathan Y Jorge | 88.7 | Exiles | 88.0 | Julian & Charlize | 87.0 | JDC | 87.3 |
| 7th | All Ready | 88.0 | Radiance | 88.0 | Audrey & Mia | 86.3 | Battle Droids Crew | 87.0 |
| 8th | Briar Nolet | 87.3 | Siudy Flamenco | 86.7 | Moving 4WARD | 86.3 | Elektro Crew | 86.3 |
| 9th | D’Angelo Brothers | 87.3 | Motiv Crew | 85.7 | The Trilogy | 86.3 | Get Down District | 85.0 |
| 10th | Poppin’ John | 85.3 | Style & Grace | 85.0 | House of Tap | 85.7 | West Springfield Dance Team | 85.0 |

=== The Duel Picks ===
Opponent selection proceeded according to rank within each division. Briar Nolet defeated Denise & Josh in the Upper Redemption Duel to advance. The Dancetown Divas defeated MKAM in the Junior Team Division Redemption Duel. Kayla Mak defeated House of Tap on the Junior Division Redemption Duel. Exiles defeated Motiv Crew in the Upper Team division.

Table key
| Key | Description | Key | Description | Key | Description |
|---|---|---|---|---|---|
| | Contestant(s) was/were eliminated | | Contestant lost their Duel, but won a Redemption Duel, advancing them to the Cut. | | Contestant lost a Redemption Duel, eliminating them from the competition. |

Contestant performances and Judges' scores
| Date | Division | Name | Performance song | Judges' score | | | |
| Date | Division | Name | Performance song | Ne-Yo | Jennifer | Derek | Average |
|---|---|---|---|---|---|---|---|
| March 17 | Upper | | | | | | |
| March 17 | Upper | Tobias & the EZTwins | "Do Your Thing" - Basement Jaxx & Metropole Orkest | 90 | 83 | 89 | 87.3 |
| March 17 | Upper | D'Angelo Brothers | "Tutti Frutti" - Little Richard | 89 | 90 | 90 | 89.7 |
| March 17 | Upper | Denise & Josh | "More" - Billy Lockett | 89 | 92 | 89 | 90.0 |
| March 17 | Upper | Jonathan y Jorge | "Me Enamoro Mas de Ti" - Tony Succar | 90 | 91 | 91 | 90.7 |
| March 17 | Upper | DD Flection | "Shutter Island" - Jessie Reyez | 90 | 88 | 89 | 89.0 |
| March 17 | Upper | Poppin John | "Who Am I (What's My Name)?" - Snoop Dogg | 91 | 92 | 91 | 91.3 |
| March 17 | Upper | Derek Piquette | "You Found Me" - The Fray | 89 | 89 | 90 | 89.3 |
| March 17 | Upper | Derion & Madison | "Awoo" - Sofi Tukker | 91 | 88 | 91 | 90.0 |
| March 17 | Upper | All Ready | "Who Let the Dogs Out?" - Baha Men | 92 | 93 | 92 | 92.3 |
| March 17 | Upper | Briar Nolet | "Come Fly With Me" - Ruelle | 87 | 90 | 94 | 90.3 |
| March 24 | Junior Team | VPeepz | "Tambourine" - Eve | 92 | 92 | 94 | 92.7 |
| March 24 | Junior Team | Battle Droids Crew | "Party Up (Up in Here)" - DMX | 90 | 90 | 91 | 90.3 |
| March 24 | Junior Team | Get Down District | "When I Grow Up" - Pussycat Dolls | 89 | 88 | 87 | 88.0 |
| March 24 | Junior Team | Intention | "Quarter Past Midnight" - Bastille | 87 | 88 | 86 | 87.0 |
| March 24 | Junior Team | MKAM | "M.A.A.D. City" - Kendrick Lamar | 92 | 88 | 92 | 90.7 |
| March 24 | Junior Team | Elektro Crew | "Dangerous" - Busta Rhymes | 93 | 90 | 90 | 91.0 |
| March 24 | Junior Team | Dancetown Divas | "Gangsta's Paradise" - 2WEI | 96 | 95 | 94 | 95.0 |
| March 24 | Junior Team | JDC | "Who You Are" - Jessie J | 98 | 95 | 95 | 96.0 |
| March 24 | Junior Team | The Crazy 8's | "Peanut Butter Jelly" - Galantis | 94 | 92 | 94 | 93.3 |
| March 24 | Junior Team | West Springfield Dance | "The Twilight Zone" - Figure feat. Hatch | 92 | 89 | 87 | 89.3 |
| March 31 | Junior | Ellie & Ava | "Because Of You" - Kelly Clarkson | 90 | 92 | 93 | 91.7 |
| March 31 | Junior | Audrey & Mia | "I'm Better" - Missy Elliott | 91 | 89 | 90 | 90.0 |
| March 31 | Junior | Kayla Mak | "Paint It Black" - Ciara | 90 | 90 | 93 | 91.0 |
| March 31 | Junior | Funkanometry | "Betta Watch Yo Self" - Problem | 92 | 91 | 92 | 91.7 |
| March 31 | Junior | Aydin Eyikan | "Youngblood" - 5 Seconds Of Summer | 91 | 89 | 91 | 90.3 |
| March 31 | Junior | Moving 4Ward | "Chasing Cars" - Snow Patrol | 94 | 93 | 92 | 93.0 |
| March 31 | Junior | Julian & Charlize | "New Level" - A$AP Ferg ft. Future | 96 | 96 | 94 | 95.3 |
| March 31 | Junior | The Trilogy | Perfectly Wrong - Shawn Mendes | 89 | 90 | 91 | 90.0 |
| March 31 | Junior | House Of Tap | Kiss Kiss - Chris Brown (ft. T-Pain) | 92 | 89 | 93 | 91.3 |
| March 31 | Junior | Lauren Yakima | Escalate - Tsar B | 97 | 95 | 96 | 96.0 |
| April 7 | Upper Team | Fuego Dance Crew | "Just A Little Bit" by 50 Cent | 93 | 91 | 89 | 91.0 |
| April 7 | Upper Team | Siudy Flamenco | "She Bangs" by Ricky Martin | 90 | 89 | 90 | 89.7 |
| April 7 | Upper Team | Unity LA | "Hurts" by Emilie Sande | 96 | 97 | 98 | 97.0 |
| April 7 | Upper Team | Style & Grace | "King's Dead" by Jay Rock, Kendrick Lamar, Future and James Blake | 88 | 88 | 88 | 88.0 |
| April 7 | Upper Team | Exiles | "Manolo" by Trip Lee feat. Lecrae | 95 | 93 | 91 | 93.0 |
| April 7 | Upper Team | The Heima | "Natural" by Imagine Dragons | 99 | 95 | 96 | 96.7 |
| April 7 | Upper Team | Radiance | "God Is a Woman" by Ariana Grande | 93 | 95 | 93 | 93.7 |
| April 7 | Upper Team | Main Guys | "X Gon Give It To Ya" by DMX | 90 | 88 | 90 | 89.3 |
| April 7 | Upper Team | Motiv Crew | "Win" by Jay Rock | 90 | 91 | 89 | 90.0 |
| April 7 | Upper Team | Kings United | "Malhari" by Vishal Dadlani, from Bajirao Mastani | 100 | 99 | 99 | 99.3 |

== Redemption ==
Contestant performances and Judges' scores
| Division | Advanced | Eliminated | Performance song | | | | |
|---|---|---|---|---|---|---|---|
| Division | Advanced | Eliminated | Performance song | Junior | Kayla Mak | House of Tap | Battle Scars by Lupe Fiasco and Guy Sebastian |
| Upper Team | Exiles | Motiv Crew | Power by Kanye West | | | | |
| Junior Team | Dancetown Divas | MKAM | Level Up by Ciara | | | | |
| Upper | Briar Nolet | Denise & Josh | Heads Will Roll by Yeah Yeah Yeahs | | | | |

== The Cut ==
In The Cut, the 24 remaining acts (6 in each division) compete for three spots in each of their divisions. As each dance act competes, their final score is displayed on a leaderboard for their division. Once a dance act's score falls out of the top 3, they face immediate elimination. For this round, each of the judges and special guest, former host, Jenna Dewan, acted as mentors for one of the four divisions; Jenna worked with the Junior Teams, Derek worked with the Upper acts, Ne-Yo worked with the Upper Teams, and Jennifer worked with the Junior acts.

Table key
| Key | Description |
|---|---|
| | Contestant(s) was/were eliminated |

The Duels scores
| Rank | Upper | | | Upper Team | | | Junior | | | Junior Team | | |
| Rank | Name | Score | Cut Rank | Name | Score | Cut Rank | Name | Score | Cut Rank | Name | Score | Cut Rank |
|---|---|---|---|---|---|---|---|---|---|---|---|---|
| 1st | All Ready | 92.3 | 4 | Kings United | 99.3 | 1 | Lauren Yakima | 96.0 | 4 | JDC | 96.0 | 4 |
| 2nd | Poppin John | 91.3 | 2 | Unity LA | 97.0 | 3 | Julian and Charlize | 95.3 | 3 | Dancetown Divas | 95.0 | 2 |
| 3rd | Jonathan Y Jorge | 90.7 | 6 | The Heima | 96.7 | 1 | Moving 4ward | 93.0 | 6 | The Crazy 8's | 93.3 | 3 |
| 4th | Briar Nolet | 90.3 | 1 | Radiance | 93.7 | 4 | Ellie and Ava | 91.7 | 1 | VPeepz | 92.7 | 1 |
| 5th | Derion & Madison | 90.0 | 3 | Exiles | 93.0 | 5 | Funkanometry | 91.7 | 5 | Elektro Crew | 91.0 | 5 |
| 6th | D'Angelo Brothers | 89.7 | 5 | Fuego Dance Crew | 91.0 | 6 | Kayla Mak | 91.0 | 2 | Get Down District | 88.0 | 6 |

The Cut Scores

Contestant performances and Judges' scores
| Date | Division | Name | Performance song | Judges' score | | | |
| Date | Division | Name | Performance song | Ne-Yo | Jennifer | Derek | Average |
|---|---|---|---|---|---|---|---|
| April 14 | Upper | | | | | | |
| April 14 | Upper | Jonathan Y Jorge | "El Timbalero" by Valentin Valdes | 91 | 90 | 91 | 90.7 |
| April 14 | Upper | Derion & Madison | "Call Out My Name" by The Weeknd | 94 | 95 | 95 | 94.7 |
| April 14 | Upper | All Ready | "Lacrimosa" by Apashe | 92 | 92 | 92 | 92.0 |
| April 14 | Upper | Briar Nolet | "Ashes" by Celine Dion | 93 | 96 | 97 | 95.3 |
| April 14 | Upper | D'Angelo Brothers | "Hit & Run" by Francis Novotny | 90 | 92 | 93 | 91.7 |
| April 14 | Upper | Poppin John | "Painting Greys" by Emmit Fenn | 95 | 95 | 95 | 95.0 |
| April 14 | Junior Team | VPeepz | "&Burn" by Billie Eilish ft. Vince Staples | 100 | 98 | 98 | 98.7 |
| April 14 | Junior Team | Elektro Crew | "Bounce Back" by Big Sean | 91 | 90 | 89 | 90.0 |
| April 14 | Junior Team | JDC | "Alone" by Halsey | 92 | 89 | 93 | 91.3 |
| April 14 | Junior Team | The Crazy 8's | "You & Me (Flume Remix)" by Disclosure | 91 | 93 | 93 | 92.3 |
| April 14 | Junior Team | Get Down District | "What About Your Friends" by TLC | 89 | 89 | 88 | 88.7 |
| April 14 | Junior Team | Dancetown Divas | "Vogue" by Madonna | 93 | 92 | 95 | 93.3 |
| April 21 | Junior | | | | | | |
| April 21 | Junior | Funkanometry | "Afterhours" by Troyboi ft. Diplo & Nina Sky | 93 | 93 | 88 | 91.3 |
| April 21 | Junior | Lauren Yakima | "Helium" by Sia | 91 | 91 | 93 | 91.7 |
| April 21 | Junior | Moving 4ward | "Come Together" by Joe Cocker | 90 | 91 | 90 | 90.3 |
| April 21 | Junior | Julian and Charlize | "Dance with Me" by 112 | 94 | 94 | 91 | 93.0 |
| April 21 | Junior | Kayla Mak | "Take Me to Church" by Hozier | 93 | 94 | 94 | 93.7 |
| April 21 | Junior | Ellie and Ava | "White Flag" by Bishop Briggs | 95 | 95 | 96 | 95.3 |
| April 21 | Upper Team | | | | | | |
| April 21 | Upper Team | Exiles | "Dum Dum" Tedashii ft. Lecrae | 90 | 90 | 91 | 90.3 |
| April 21 | Upper Team | The Kings | "Tattad Tattad" by Aditya Narayan | 96 | 99 | 98 | 97.7 |
| April 21 | Upper Team | Unity LA | "Ribs" by Lorde | 93 | 93 | 94 | 93.3 |
| April 21 | Upper Team | Fuego Dance Crew | "Gasolina" by Daddy Yankee | 90 | 89 | 89 | 89.3 |
| April 21 | Upper Team | Radiance | Slow Dancing in a Burning Room" by John Mayer | 94 | 92 | 92 | 92.7 |
| April 21 | Upper Team | The Heima | "Love Me Again" John Newman | 100 | 95 | 98 | 97.7 |

== Divisional Final ==
In the Divisional Final, the 3 remaining acts in each division square off, with only one act going to the World Final to represent their division. Same as The Cut, each of the judges and special guest, Stephen "tWitch" Boss, became mentors for one of the four divisions. Jennifer mentored the Junior Teams, Derek worked with the Junior acts, Ne-Yo worked with the Upper acts, and tWitch worked with the Upper Teams. One act is also chosen as a Wildcard to compete in the World Finals.

Table key
| Key | Description |
|---|---|
| | Contestant(s) was/were eliminated |
| | Contestant was the Judge's Wildcard Pick |

Contestant performances and Judges' scores
| Date | Division | Name | Performance song | Judges' score | | | |
| Date | Division | Name | Performance song | Ne-Yo | Jennifer | Derek | Average |
|---|---|---|---|---|---|---|---|
| April 28 | Upper | Derion & Madison | "Makeba" - Jain | 92 | 91 | 93 | 92.0 |
| April 28 | Upper | Poppin John | "Universal Mind Control" - Common | 95 | 96 | 94 | 95.0 |
| April 28 | Upper | Briar Nolet | "My Prerogative" - Britney Spears | 96 | 93 | 97 | 95.3 |
| April 28 | Junior Team | The Crazy 8's | "Burn" - Ellie Goulding | 94 | 93 | 92 | 93.0 |
| April 28 | Junior Team | VPeepz | "Party People" - Nelly feat. Fergie | 96 | 95 | 97 | 96.0 |
| April 28 | Junior Team | Dancetown Divas | "Run the World (Girls)" - Beyoncé | 95 | 96 | 96 | 95.7 |
| April 28 | Junior | Ellie & Ava | "Head Above Water" - Avril Lavigne | 94 | 95 | 99 | 96.0 |
| April 28 | Junior | Julian & Charlize | "Bad & Boujee" - Migos feat. Lil Uzi Vert | 95 | 96 | 96 | 95.7 |
| April 28 | Junior | Kayla Mak | "Never Tear Us Apart" - Bishop Briggs | 94 | 97 | 95 | 95.3 |
| April 28 | Upper Team | The Heima | "Born Ready" - Zayde Wølf | 92 | 93 | 95 | 93.3 |
| April 28 | Upper Team | Unity LA | "Piece by Piece" - Kelly Clarkson | 100 | 96 | 100 | 98.7 |
| April 28 | Upper Team | Kings United | "Yeh Raat" - Anupama | 100 | 99 | 100 | 99.7 |

== World Final ==
In the World Final, the final 4 division champions plus 1 wildcard compete head to head to win the one million dollar prize. Each team performs one routine and the highest scorer is adjudged the world champion.

Contestant performances and Judges' scores
| Date | Division | Name | Performance song | Judges' score | | | |
| Date | Division | Name | Performance song | Ne-Yo | Jennifer | Derek | Average |
|---|---|---|---|---|---|---|---|
| May 5 | Upper | Briar Nolet | "Toxic" - 2WEI | 92 | 92 | 94 | 92.7 |
| May 5 | Junior Team | VPeepz | "Can't Hold Us" - Macklemore & Ryan Lewis ft. Ray Dalton | 94 | 91 | 96 | 93.7 |
| May 5 | Junior | Ellie & Ava | "Knocking on Heaven's Door" - Raign | 94 | 95 | 96 | 95.0 |
| May 5 | Upper Team | Unity LA | "Pretty Wings" - Maxwell | 95 | 94 | 98 | 95.7 |
| May 5 | Upper Team | Kings United | "Aadevadanna Eedevadanna" - Sardaar Gabbar Singh | 100 | 100 | 100 | 100.0 |

Table key
| Key | Description |
|---|---|
| | Contestant won the competition |
| | Contestant placed 2nd |
| | Contestant placed 3rd |
| | Contestant placed 4th |
| | Contestant placed 5th |

World Final scores
| Upper | | Upper Team | | Junior | | Junior Team | | Wildcard | |
| Name | Score | Name | Score | Name | Score | Name | Score | Name | Score |
|---|---|---|---|---|---|---|---|---|---|
| Briar Nolet | 92.7 | Kings United | 100.0 | Ellie & Ava | 95.0 | VPeepz | 93.7 | Unity LA | 95.7 |

== Highest Scoring Dances ==
| Dance act | Division | Round | Music | Scores |
|---|---|---|---|---|
| Kings United | Upper Team | World Finals | "Aadevadana Eedevadana"—Sardaar Gabbar Singh | 100.0 (100, 100, 100) |
| Kings United | Upper Team | Divisional Finals | "Yeh Raat"—Anupama | 99.7 (100, 99, 100) |
| Kings United | Upper Team | The Duels | "Malhari"—Vishal Dadlani | 99.3 (100, 99, 99) |
| VPeepz | Junior Team | The Cut | "&Burn"—Billie Eilish feat. Vince Staples | 98.7 (100, 98, 98) |
| Unity LA | Upper Team | Divisional Finals | "Piece by Piece"—Kelly Clarkson | 98.7 (100, 96, 100) |
| Kings United | Upper Team | Qualifiers | "Dhakka Laga Bukka Yuva"—A.R Rahman, Karthik & Mehboob | 97.7 (97, 98, 98) |
| Kings United | Upper Team | The Cut | "Tattad Tattad"—Aditya Narayan | 97.7 (96, 99, 98) |
| The Heima | Upper Team | The Cut | "Love Me Again"—John Newman | 97.7 (100, 95, 98) |
| Unity LA | Upper Team | The Duels | "Hurts"—Emilie Sande | 97.0 (96, 97, 98) |
| The Heima | Upper Team | The Duels | "Natural"—Imagine Dragons | 96.7 (99, 95, 96) |
| Lauren Yakima | Junior | The Duels | "Escalate"—Tsar B | 96.0 (97, 95, 96) |
| JDC | Junior Team | The Duels | "Who You Are" — Jessie J | 96.0 (98, 95, 95) |
| VPeepz | Junior Team | Divisional Finals | "Party People"—Nelly feat. Fergie | 96.0 (96, 95, 97) |
| Ellie & Ava | Junior | Divisional Finals | "Head Above Water"—Avril Lavigne | 96.0 (94, 95, 99) |
| Lauren Yakima | Junior | Qualifiers | "(I Just) Died in Your Arms "—Hidden Citizens | 95.7 (97, 94, 96) |
| Dancetown Divas | Junior Team | Divisional Finals | "Run the World (Girls)"—Beyoncé | 95.7 (95, 96, 96) |
| Julian & Charlize | Junior | Divisional Finals | "Bad & Boujee"—Migos feat. Lil Uzi Vert | 95.7 (95, 96, 96) |
| Unity LA | Upper Team | World Finals | "Pretty Wings"—Maxwell | 95.7 (95, 94, 98) |

== Ratings ==
Viewership and ratings per episode of World of Dance season 3
| No. | Title | Air date | Rating/share (18–49) | Viewers (millions) |
|---|---|---|---|---|
| 1 | "The Qualifiers 1" | February 26, 2019 | 1.4/6 | 6.26 |
| 2 | "The Qualifiers 2" | March 3, 2019 | 1.0/4 | 4.18 |
| 3 | "The Qualifiers 3" | March 10, 2019 | 0.8/4 | 3.49 |
| 4 | "The Duels 1" | March 17, 2019 | 0.8/4 | 3.73 |
| 5 | "The Duels 2" | March 24, 2019 | 0.8/4 | 3.33 |
| 6 | "The Duels 3" | March 31, 2019 | 0.7/3 | 3.24 |
| 7 | "The Duels 4" | April 7, 2019 | 0.7/3 | 3.24 |
| 8 | "The Cut 1" | April 14, 2019 | 0.7/3 | 3.27 |
| 9 | "The Cut 2" | April 21, 2019 | 0.7/3 | 2.93 |
| 10 | "Divisional Final" | April 28, 2019 | 0.8/4 | 3.38 |
| 11 | "World Final" | May 5, 2019 | 0.8/3 | 3.55 |
