= World of Dance (TV series) =

American reality competition TV series

- Genre: Reality competition
- Presented by: Jenna Dewan; Scott Evans
- Judges: Jennifer Lopez; Ne-Yo; Derek Hough
- Opening theme: "Phantom Pt. II" by Justice
- Country of origin: United States
- Original language: English
- No. of seasons: 4
- No. of episodes: 49

Production
- Executive producers: Jennifer Lopez; Elaine Goldsmith-Thomas; Benny Medina; Matilda Zoltowski; Kris Curry; David Gonzalez; Matthew Everitt; Al Hassas
- Running time: 60-120 minutes
- Production companies: Nuyorican Productions; World of Dance; Universal Television Alternative

Original release
- Network: NBC
- Release: May 30, 2017 – August 12, 2020

World of Dance is an American reality competition television series executive produced by Jennifer Lopez. The first two seasons were hosted by Jenna Dewan. The third season saw a change in hosts, as Scott Evans hosted season three and four. The series features dance performers, including solo acts and larger groups, representing any style of dance, competing for a grand prize of $1 million. The contestants are scored by judges Jennifer Lopez, Ne-Yo, and Derek Hough.

The series was created in partnership with the World of Dance enterprise, which produces dance competitions and dance lifestyle events in more than 25 countries, spanning the U.S., Europe, South America, and Asia. Videos captured from these events have driven more than 1 billion views online.

The series premiered on NBC on May 30, 2017. The fourth season premiered on May 26, 2020.

In March 2021, the series was canceled after four seasons.

== Premise ==
=== Format changes ===
Season 2

- While the format for season two remained relatively unchanged, there were a few slight alterations. Season 2 received a 16-episode order, six more than the ten-episode first season. Additionally, this season, a fourth category, Junior Team, was added for acts under 18 with 5 or more members. The qualifier rounds are cut down from a two minutes to a one-minute routine. The Duels routines are cut down from two minutes to 75 seconds. The top three highest-scoring acts in The Cut from each division will move on to The Divisional Final, in season one it was just the top two. The Cut, Divisional and World Final rounds are cut down from a two minutes to a '90 seconds'-routine. In The Cut and Divisional Final guest celebrities are assigned as mentors to each division. On World Final there are intermezzo shows. Season two by Les Twins, Keone & Mari (actually Mariel) Madrid, Kinjaz and Derek Hough.

Season 3

- Original host Jenna Dewan left after the conclusion of season two which left the position open. Access Live co-host, Scott Evans took over as host in the third season. The required qualifier score to enter the duels increased from 80 to 85. The duels feature a redemption round where the Top 2 eliminated acts (in each division) with the highest score compete head to head for a second chance to advance to The Cuts. In the redemption, the 2 acts compete back to back to the same music. Afterwards, the judges vote to decide which act will advance.
- In the Divisional Final, the judges pick one more act to advance to the World Final as a wild card. In the World Final, each act performs once instead of twice.
- The guest judge is removed this season.

Season 4

- The team divisions have now been merged within the Junior and Upper divisions so There are now only 2 divisions; Junior Division and Upper Division.
- The scoring system was abolished in favor of votes (this applies for Qualifiers and Duels).
- In the Qualifiers, contestants need at least two yeses to proceed to the Duels. Judges may also cast a callback vote which gives the contestants a final chance to perform again to advance to the Duels
- In the Duels, contestants no longer choose their opponent. Instead, the judges pick who they are battling and is revealed only upon entering the room. Moreover, a guest judge picks who will perform head-to-head in the Redemption Duels.
- In the Cut, contestants are no longer separated by division, instead just some uppers and some juniors in each episode. Another point of interest may be the scores were used to figure out which 2 would make it to the world finals, what was unusual was the fact because of this, there was a chance all of the people in the world finals would be from the same division, also a high scoring team didn't get through but a lower scoring one did, again it wouldn't have been a big deal if the 2 leaderboards were combined.
- Another change was they removed the Divisional Finals.
- In the world finals, a change of knowing your score after your dance instead of all together at the end.

=== Show concept ===
In preparation for season two, handpicked competitors, being talented in any styles of dancing, from qualifying events around the nation and thousands of online submissions, are divided into four divisions: Junior (groups of 1 to 4, under 18), Upper (groups of 1 to 4, 18 and older), Junior Team (groups of 5+, under 18) and Upper Team (groups of 5+, 18 and older). In some cases dancers who didn't apply were directly contacted by the producers or their agents. The below listed processes can change depending on the season being watched or recorded; however, this layout should fill all the general criteria.

The elimination process of the contestants are in four rounds:

1. The Qualifiers - The contestants have to qualify with at least 85 points (80 in seasons 1 and 2) to make it to The Duels.
2. The Duels - The contestants choose their opponent starting with the highest scorer from the qualifiers. If the number of contestants in a division is uneven, the last duel will be competed by the three remaining opponents that were unpicked previously. In season 3, they added the redemption where the top 2 eliminated acts go against each other. The winner of the duel is the contestant/s with the highest score who then move on to The Cut.
3. The Cut - Mentors are assigned to each division to prepare the contestants for their performances. The top three scoring acts in each division move on to Divisional Final.
4. Divisional Final - The mentors still support the contestants from each division. The top scoring act in each division will become division champion and move on to the World Final. It went public later that the division champions got US$50,000 prize money each 3 months after last show airing. Starting in Season 3, the judges send one more act to the World Final as a wild card.

In the World Final all four division champions and one wild card will compete for the US$1,000,000 grand prize. In Season 1 and 2 every act performed twice in two separate rounds with the final score being determined by the average score of both rounds. Starting in Season 3, each act only performed once. The contestant(s) with the highest final score being crowned World of Dance champion and winning the US$1,000,000 grand prize.

=== Scoring ===
The judges are scoring in 5 categories. Each category is worth 20 points, with a perfect score of 100:

- Performance (20 points):
  - Effort: How many different elements put into the routine without overloading or rushing through it. What was the whole effort to dance the performance by the act.
  - Personality: How characters and personality put into the performance, in the sense of acting to stimulate emotions by the audience, telling a story or framing pictures.
- Technique (20 points):
  - Transitions: How smooth and elegant the transitions from move to move were without lacking a performance moment.
  - Cleanness: How synchronized, ordered by a pattern, precise and committed the movements were within the act.
  - Execution: How flawless the execution of the performance by the act was to the performance song.
- Choreography (20 points):
  - Difficulty: How difficult it was to perform the figures and movements by the act from judges point of view.
  - Musicality: How well pictures, figures and movements were choreographed to the sound and beat of the performance song.
  - Tricks: Are unexpected show elements included by properties, clothing or the bodies of the dancers and how well was it done.
- Creativity (20 points):
  - Originality: How unique, new, fresh and interesting was the performance.
  - Artistic Choices: What styles of dancing were shown and merged. How well was it done regarding basic dance styles and style culture, e.g. costumes, shoes. The performance song and the use of properties are artistic choices as well. How well did they fit to the performance.
  - Dynamics: How energizing and powerful the performance was and how much action was on stage.
- Presentation (20 points):
  - Crowd Appeal: How the crowd around the show stage reacted to the performance.
  - Impact: How memorable, influential and worth talking about it later the performance was.

== Production ==
=== Development ===
Jennifer Lopez, along with Elaine Goldsmith-Thomas, Benny Medina, Kris Curry, Matilda Zoltowski, David Gonzalez, Matthew Everitt, and Al Hassas served as executive producers. Lopez, who served as both executive producer and judge, felt that the series would be a return to her roots; Lopez had achieved early fame as a member of In Living Color's dance crew, The Fly Girls. She explained that dance had been her "first form of artistic expression", and that the series "reminded me of all the reasons why I love dance and why I wanted to do this in the first place".

The series premiere was originally scheduled for May 8, 2017, as a lead-out for The Voice, but was postponed to May 30, 2017, to serve as a lead-out for the season premiere of America's Got Talent. On June 29, 2017, NBC renewed the series for a second season, which premiered on May 29, 2018, once again serving as the lead-out for the season premiere of America's Got Talent.

In May 2018, prior to its second season premiere, World of Dance was renewed for a third season; instead of airing as a summer series, it aired at midseason, premiering on February 26, 2019, before it was moved to a new Sunday night timeslot. Host Jenna Dewan chose to leave the show after season 2. She was replaced by Access Hollywood co-host Scott Evans. The fourth season premiered on May 26, 2020.

On March 15, 2021, the series was canceled after four seasons.

== Series overview ==
Season	Duration		Episodes	Winner's prize	Finalists					Host	Judging Panel		
Season	Premiere	Finale	Episodes	Winner's prize	Winner	Runner-up	Third place	Fourth place	Fifth place	Host	Judging Panel		
1	May 30, 2017	August 8, 2017	10	$1,000,000	Les Twins	Eva Igo	Swing Latino	Keone & Mari	Kinjaz	Jenna Dewan	Ne-Yo	Jennifer Lopez	Derek Hough
2	May 29, 2018	September 12, 2018	16	$1,000,000	The Lab	Michael Dameski	Charity & Andres	S-Rank	Karen y Ricardo	Jenna Dewan	Ne-Yo	Jennifer Lopez	Derek Hough
3	February 26, 2019	May 5, 2019	11	$1,000,000	Kings United	Unity LA	Ellie & Ava	VPeepz	Briar Nolet	Scott Evans	Ne-Yo	Jennifer Lopez	Derek Hough
4	May 26, 2020	August 12, 2020	12	$1,000,000	MDC 3	Jefferson and Adrianita	Géométrie Variable	Oxygen	Jake & Chau	Scott Evans	Ne-Yo	Jennifer Lopez	Derek Hough

== International versions ==
Legend:

Currently airing
Upcoming season
Awaiting confirmation
Status unknown
New season mostly likely but no air dates announced yet
No longer airing

Country	Title	TV Network	Seasons and winners	Prize	Hosts	Judges
Philippines	World of Dance Philippines	ABS-CBN	Season 1, 2019: FCPC Baliktanaw	₱2,000,000	Luis Manzano; Pia Wurtzbach	Billy Crawford; Gary Valenciano; Maja Salvador
Poland	World of Dance Polska	Polsat	Season 1, 2018: Ildar Gaynutdinov	$100,000	Olga Kalicka; Karol Niecikowski	Michał Malitowski; Edyta Herbuś; Rafał Kamiński
Thailand	World of Dance Thailand	One31	Season 1, 2018: DD Flection	฿1,000,000	Unknown	
Ukraine	Танці. World of Dance	STB	Season 1, 2022: Tymur Putiata & Yevheniya Pindyura (Kids); Yevhen Karyakin (Adults); Twinkles. Creative Dance Family (Teams)	No prize	Natalia Tatarintseva	Yevhen Kot; Tetyana Denisova; Maksim Chmerkovskiy (the jury was cut out of the season for Denisova staying in Russia during the country's invasion of Ukraine)
United States (original format)	World of Dance	NBC	Season 1, 2017: Les Twins; Season 2, 2018: The Lab; Season 3, 2019: Kings United; Season 4, 2020: MDC 3	$1,000,000	Jenna Dewan (1–2); Scott Evans (3–4)	Jennifer Lopez; Ne-Yo; Derek Hough

== Awards and nominations ==
=== Primetime Emmy Award ===
Note: The year given is the year of the ceremony

Year	Award	Nominee	Result
2019	Outstanding Choreography for Variety or Reality Programming	Melvin "Timtim" Rogador (for "Drop It Like It's Hot", "Headband", "DNA")	Nominated
2019	Outstanding Choreography for Variety or Reality Programming	Suresh Mukund (for "Malhari", "Yeh Raat", "O Fortuna")	Nominated
2019	Outstanding Choreography for Variety or Reality Programming	Karen Forcano and Ricardo Vega (for "Pegate", "La Malanga", "Caminare")	Nominated
2019	Outstanding Choreography for Variety or Reality Programming	Tessandra Chavez (for "Piece by Piece", "Don't Wanna Think", "Fix You")	Won
2019	Outstanding Hairstyling for a Multi-Camera Series or Special	Dean Banowetz, Meagan Herrera-Schaaf, Cory Rotenberg, Yuko Koach, John McCormick and Melanie Verkins (for "Episode 306")	Nominated
2020	Outstanding Choreography for Variety or Reality Programming	Jefferson Benjumea and Adrianita Avila (for "Dos Jueyes", "El Ray Timbal")	Nominated

== See also ==
- So You Think You Can Dance
- Dancing with the Stars
- Dance Dance Dance
- Dance Plus
