= Briar Nolet =

Canadian dancer and actress (born 1998)

- Born: Briar Anne Nolet; December 27, 1998 (age 27); Oakville, Ontario, Canada
- Education: Holy Trinity Catholic School
- Occupations: Dancer; actress
- Years active: 2005–present
- Television: The Next Step; World of Dance
- Website: halobraxton.com

Briar Anne Nolet (born December 27, 1998) is a Canadian dancer and actress, known for her role as Richelle on the Family Channel series The Next Step. In 2019, she competed on the third season of World of Dance. She portrayed Salome, stepdaughter of Herod Antipas, in season 4 of The Chosen.

== Career ==
Nolet began dancing at the age of seven, and growing up, she competed in dance competitions around Canada. In 2014, she began portraying the role of Richelle on the Family Channel series The Next Step. As part of The Next Step franchise, Nolet has toured in Canada, Australia, and the United Kingdom.

In 2017, Nolet auditioned for the first season of the NBC dance series World of Dance, but did not proceed any further. Then, in 2019, she returned to compete in the third season of World of Dance. After finishing in fifth place, World of Dance judge Jennifer Lopez invited Nolet to perform on the It's My Party Tour. André Hereford described Nolet as a "death-dropping, back-flipping spitfire".

On March 18, 2022, she launched her activewear line, Halo Braxton, with the goal of being "able to offer women quality standards that meet their lifestyle needs while making them feel as gorgeous and powerful as they are."

In 2024 she auditioned for the fourth season of Canada's Got Talent.

== Personal life ==
Nolet was previously in a very publicized relationship with her The Next Step co-star Myles Erlick from 2014 to 2022. The reason behind their breakup is unknown, and both Briar and Myles have kept a low profile on the matter. In October 2022, she announced a new relationship with Toronto businessman Colin McLeod via Instagram.. In late July 2026, Nolet confirmed she is in a relationship with Erik Linder during a podcast interview.

While competing on World of Dance, Nolet revealed that she began having seizures at the age of 16. Nolet was initially misdiagnosed with anxiety, but after visiting a neurologist in Toronto, she was diagnosed with epilepsy at the age of 19.

== Filmography ==
=== Film ===
Year	Title	Role	Notes
2014	Isabelle Dances Into the Spotlight	Ballet Class / Audition Dancers	Direct-to-video film
2016	Blood Hunters	Creature	
2019	Let It Snow	Lisa	

=== Television ===
Year	Title	Role	Notes
2014–2025	The Next Step	Richelle	140 episodes (Note: Recurring role (seasons 2–3, 9); Main role (seasons 4–8); Guest role (season 10))
2019	World of Dance	Herself	Contestant: 5th place
2022	Zombies 3	Werewolf Dancer	Television film
2024	The Chosen	Salome	Season 4
2026	Dancing with the Stars: The Next Pro	Herself	Contestant: 11th place

=== Music video ===
Song	Year	Role	Artist(s)	Director
Farther We Go	2020	The Jogger	Walk off the Earth	Paul D. Maxwell
Cut Me Loose	2021	Herself	Harm & Ease	Paul D. Maxwell
