= Swing Latino =

Salsa dance school academy in Cali, Colombia

Swing Latino is a salsa dance school academy in Cali, Colombia, founded in the late 1990s by its current director, dancer and choreographer, Luis Eduardo Hernandez (also known as "El Mulato").

They are known for their appearance in the Fox TV show ¡Q'Viva! The Chosen.

Swing Latino has won multiple salsa dance contests in their home country Colombia and in the United States including the 2004 World Congress "Salsa Open" in Philadelphia, the 2005 World Salsa Dancing Federation's Championship, in Miami and the 2006 and 2007 Las Vegas Salsa Championship, which aired in ESPN.

Swing Latino has also performed abroad in Puerto Rico and toured throughout the United Kingdom.

== Television ==
In 2009, Swing Latino was a guest performer in the Polish television show You Can Dance: Po prostu tańcz! and the following day made another appearance on that same country's morning show Dzień Dobry TVN. Swing Latino also appeared on the Colombian telenovela Un Sueño Llamado Salsa which aired in the United States on the Spanish language network Telefutura in 2010. In 2012, after a visit from fellow salsa singer Marc Anthony, Swing Latino was featured as one of many Latin artists appearing in the television show ¡Q'Viva! The Chosen, airing in both Fox and Univision networks.

Swing Latino appeared and competed on the first season of the 2017 reality program World of Dance. They were the winners of the team division and competed in the finale against Les Twins and Eva Igo.

== Current members ==
- Nilson Emir Castro Riascos
- Deisy Alejandra Roldan Zapata
- Kevin Alberto Alzate Mosquera
- Steven´s Rebolledo Montaño (MAIN DANCER)
- Yinessa Ortega Ulcue (MAIN DANCER)
- Angie Osorio (MAIN DANCER)
- Leidy Giraldo (MAIN DANCER)
- Ingrid Vanesa Tabaez
- Lina Marcela Montoya
- Jhon Andres Lucual Colorado
- Cristian David Montenegro
- Jhon Jairo Cabezas Caicedo
- Paula Tatiana Guevara
- Jeimmy Fabian larguelia
- Yohana Molina Calambas
- Jonier Francisco Torres
- Luz Adriana Posso
- Jenny Lorena Rodríguez
- Carlos Fernando Marquez
- Andres Felipe Diez
- Saray Gonzales Duque
- Johan Moreno
- Eliana Katherine Feijoo Saavedra
- Emanuelle Antonio Campaz
