= America's Big Deal =

- Genre: Reality television
- Presented by: Scott Evans; Joy Mangano
- Country of origin: United States
- Original language: English
- No. of seasons: 1

Original release
- Network: USA Network
- Release: October 14 – December 16, 2021

America's Big Deal is an American business reality television series that premiered on October 14, 2021 on USA Network.

== Premise ==
Aired live from Newark Symphony Hall in Newark, New Jersey, the series features amateur entrepreneurs pitching ready made products to home viewers. At the episodes end the contestant with the highest sales total gets a chance to strike a deal with one of three retailers, Lowe's, Macy's and QVC/HSN.
