= World of Dance Polska =

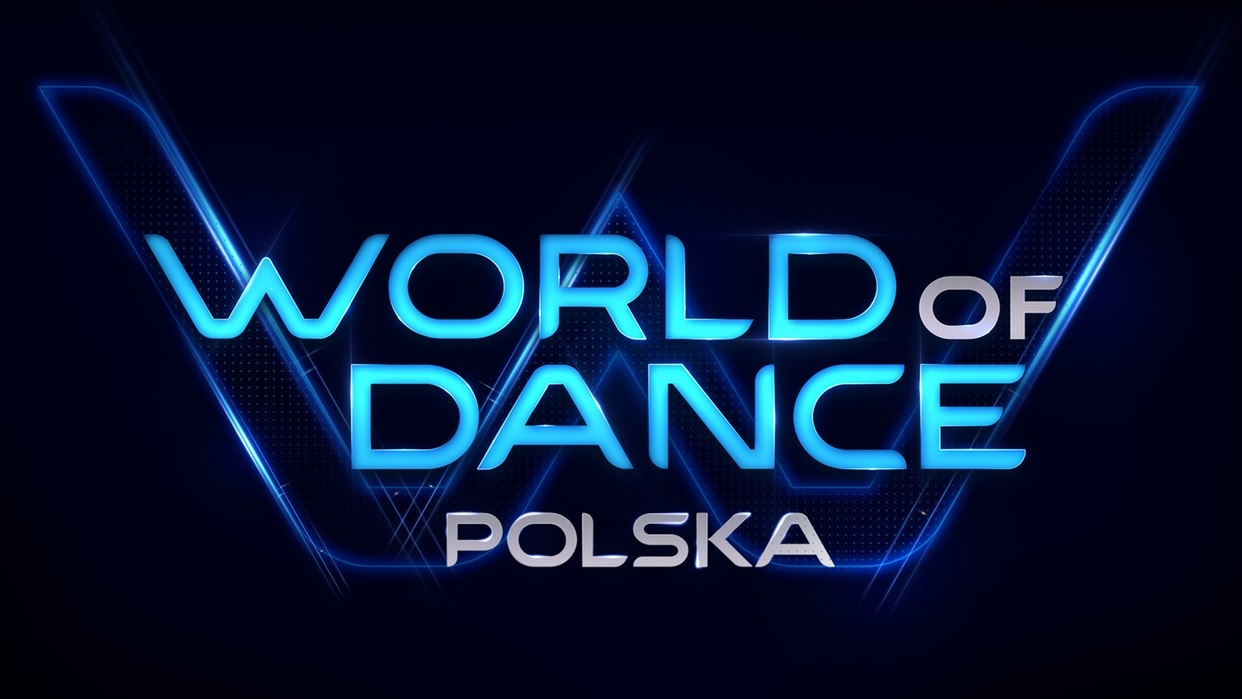
- Genre: Competition
- Presented by: Olga Kalicka; Karol Niecikowski
- Judges: Edyta Herbuś; Rafał Roofie Kamiński; Michael Malitowski
- Country of origin: Poland
- Original language: Polish
- No. of seasons: 1
- No. of episodes: 10

Production
- Running time: 65–90 minutes
- Production companies: Rochstar; World of Dance; Nuyorican Productions; Universal Television Alternative

Original release
- Network: Polsat
- Release: 14 September – 16 November 2018

Related
- World of Dance (U.S.)

World of Dance Polska (World of Dance Poland) is a Polish reality competition television series based on the original American version, hosted by Olga Kalicka and Karol Niecikowski. The series features dance performers, including solo acts and larger groups, representing any style of dance, competing for a grand prize of US$100,000 (PLN 375,000).

In April 2018 Nina Terentiew, program director of Polsat, confirmed the information about the preparation of the first Polish edition of the program.

== Premise ==
=== Show concept ===
In preparation for the polish version, handpicked competitors, being talented in any styles of dancing, from qualifying events around the nation and thousands of online submissions, are divided into four divisions: Junior (groups of 1-4, under 18), Upper (groups of 1-4, 18 and older), Junior Team (groups of 5+, under 18) and Upper Team (groups of 5+, 18 and older). In some cases dancers who did not apply were directly contacted by the producers or their agents.

The elimination process of the contestants are in four rounds:

1. The Qualifiers - The contestants have to qualify with at least 80 points to make it to The Duels.
2. The Duels - The contestants choose their opponent starting with the highest scorer from the qualifiers. If the number of contestants in a division is uneven, the last duel will be competed by the three remaining opponents that were unpicked previously. The winner of the duel is the contestant/s with the highest score who then move on to The Cut.
3. The Cut - Mentors are assigned to each division to prepare the contestants for their performances. The top three scoring acts in each division move on to The Division Finals.
4. The Division Finals - The mentors still support the contestants from each division. The top scoring act in each division will become division champion and move on to The World Final.

In The World Final all four division champions will compete for the US$100,000 (PLN 375,000) grand prize. It is expected that the concept of last season is copied; every contestant will perform twice in two separate rounds. The average score of both rounds by each contestant will make their final score. The contestant(s) with the highest final score will be crowned World of Dance champion 2018 and will win the grand prize.

=== Scoring ===
The judges are scoring in 5 categories. Each category is worth 20 points, with a perfect score of 100:

- Performance (20 points):
  - Effort: How many different elements put into the routine. What is the whole effort to dance the performance by the act.
  - Personality: How characters and personality put into the performance, in the sense of acting to stimulate emotions by the audience, telling a story or framing pictures.
- Technique (20 points):
  - Transitions: How smooth and elegant the transitions from move to move were without lacking a performance moment.
  - Cleanness: How synchronized, ordered by a pattern, precise and committed the movements were within the act.
  - Execution: How flawless the execution of the performance by the act was to the performance song.
- Choreography (20 points):
  - Difficulty: How difficult it was to perform the figures and movements by the act from judges point of view.
  - Musicality: How well pictures, figures and movements were choreographed to the sound and beat of the performance song.
  - Tricks: Are unexpected show elements included by properties, clothing or the bodies of the dancers and how well was it done.
- Creativity (20 points):
  - Originality: How unique and interesting was the performance.
  - Artistic Choices: What styles of dancing were shown and merged. How well was it done regarding basic dance styles and style culture, e.g. costumes, shoes. The performance song is an artistic choice as well. How well did it fit to the performance.
  - Dynamics: How energizing and powerful the performance was and how much action was on stage.
- Presentation (20 points):
  - Crowd Appeal: How the crowd around the show stage reacted to the performance.
  - Impact: How memorable and worth talking about it later the performance was.

== Series overview ==
Season	Duration		Episodes	Winner's prize	Finalists				Presenter	Judges		
Season	Premiere	Finale	Episodes	Winner's prize	Winner	Runner-up	Third place	Fourth place	Presenter	Judges		
1	September 14, 2018	November 16, 2018	10	$100,000 (PLN 375,000)	Ildar Gaynutdinov	TSN	Atom Mini	-	Olga Kalicka; Karol Niecikowski	Rafał Kamiński	Edyta Herbuś	Michał Malitowski

== See also ==
- So You Think You Can Dance
- World of Dance organization
