= World of Dance season 1 =

World of Dance
- Season 1
- Hosted by: Jenna Dewan
- Judges: Ne-Yo; Jennifer Lopez; Derek Hough
- Winner: Les Twins
- Runner-up: Eva Igo

Release
- Original network: NBC
- Original release: May 30 – August 8, 2017

Season chronology
- Next → Season 2

The first season of American reality dance competition World of Dance premiered May 30, 2017, on NBC. Jennifer Lopez, Ne-Yo, and Derek Hough served as the judges, with Jenna Dewan serving as host. Hip hop dancers Les Twins, from Paris, France, were crowned as the winners of the $1,000,000 prize on August 8, 2017. Fourteen-year-old contemporary dancer Eva Igo and Latin/Swing group Swing Latino were named first runner-up and second runner-up respectively.

== Dancers ==
=== Junior (under 18) ===
Dance act	Age(s)	Hometown	Dance style	Elimination date	Placement	Average Score	Qualifier	Duel	Cut	Divisional Final	World Final
Eva Igo	14	Inver Grove Heights, Minnesota	Contemporary	–	World Final (2nd Place)	92.3	88.0	89.0	92.5	96.7	93.7
Diana Pombo	11	Miami, Florida	Contemporary	August 1, 2017	Divisional Final	90.6	89.7	91.3	92.0	89.3	–
The Mihacevich Sisters	12–16	Brunswick, Ohio	Contemporary	July 18, 2017	The Cut	84.5	87.0	81.0	85.5	–	–
ImmaBEAST^{1}	–	Los Angeles, California	Hip-Hop	July 18, 2017	The Cut	–	–	86.0	84.2	–	–
The Lab	–	West Covina, California	Hip-Hop	July 18, 2017	The Cut	89.0	91.3	89.7	86.0	–	–
D'Angelo and Amanda	16/17	Miami, Florida	Ballroom	July 11, 2017	The Duels	83.5	88.3	78.7	–	–	–
Mini ReQuest^{1}^{2}	–	Auckland, New Zealand	Hip-Hop	July 11, 2017	The Duels	–	–	85.7	–	–	–
Boys of Temecula	–	Temecula, California	Jazz	June 27, 2017	The Duels	82.5	80.3	84.7	–	–	–
The Posse	–	San Jose, California	Contemporary	June 27, 2017	The Duels	85.0	84.0	86.0	–	–	–
KynTay	–	Alberta, Canada	Hip-Hop/Jazz	June 20, 2017	The Duels	84.2	85.7	82.7	–	–	–
801 Squad	–	Orem, Utah	–	June 13, 2017	Qualifiers	79.3	79.3	–	–	–	–
JJ and Joey	–	Johnston, Rhode Island	–	June 6, 2017	Qualifiers	78.0	78.0	–	–	–	–
Kaeli and Brandon	–	Ashburn, Virginia	–	June 6, 2017	Qualifiers	77.7	77.7	–	–	–	–

=== Upper (18 and over, up to 4 members) ===
Dance act	Age(s)	Hometown	Dance style	Elimination date	Placement	Average Score	Qualifier	Duel	Cut	Divisional Final	World Final
Les Twins	28	Paris, France	Hip-Hop	–	1st Place	94.4	95.7	92.0	93.5	97.7	93.8
Keone and Mari	29/31	San Diego, California	Urban Dance	August 1, 2017	Divisional Final	91.3	85.0	91.3	93.2	95.0	–
Luka & Jenalyn	19/16	Toronto, Ontario	Cabaret Ballroom	July 25, 2017	The Cut	85.3	86.7	88.7	80.5	–	–
Fik-Shun	22	Las Vegas, Nevada	Freestyle Street Dancer	July 25, 2017	The Cut	88.6	91.0	90.7	84.2	–	–
Pasión	–	Santa Barbara, California	Flamenco	July 25, 2017	The Cut	84.6	87.7	87.3	78.8	–	–
DNA	–	New York City, New York	Ballroom	July 11, 2017	The Duels	83.2	86.0	80.3	–	–	–
Kings Unite^{1}^{2}	–	Los Angeles, California	Hip-Hop	July 11, 2017	The Duels	–	–	83.7	–	–	–
Kyle Van Newkirk	20	Morrill, Nebraska	Tap	June 27, 2017	The Duels	83.4	80.7	86.0	–	–	–
Nick Daniels	18	Miami, Florida	Contemporary	June 20, 2017	The Duels	87.4	87.0	87.7	–	–	–
Quick Style	–	Oslo, Norway	Hip-Hop	June 20, 2017	The Duels	88.0	86.7	89.3	–	–	–
Trent Jeray	–	Memphis, Tennessee	–	June 13, 2017	Qualifiers	79.3	79.3	–	–	–	–
Vibration	–	Miami, Florida	–	June 13, 2017	Qualifiers	78.0	78.0	–	–	–	–

=== Team (18 and over, 5–15 members) ===
Dance act	Age(s)	Hometown	Dance style	Elimination date	Placement	Average Score	Qualifier	Duel	Cut	Divisional Final	World Final
Swing Latino	–	Cali, Colombia	Salsa	–	World Final (3rd Place)	92.4	89.3	91.7	92.5	94.7	93.2
Kinjaz	–	Los Angeles, California	Urban Dance	August 1, 2017	Divisional Final	92.0	91.0	91.3	93.5	92.3	–
Ian Eastwood and the Young Lions	–	Los Angeles, California	Urban Dance	July 25, 2017	The Cut	86.1	83.7	85.7	89.0	–	–
Chapkis Dance Family	–	Suisun City, California	Hip-Hop	July 25, 2017	The Cut	87.8	89.0	88.7	85.8	–	–
Super Cr3w	–	Las Vegas, Nevada	B-Boy	July 25, 2017	The Cut	88.6	88.0	89.0	88.8	–	–
Jabbawockeez	–	Las Vegas, Nevada	Hip-Hop	July 11, 2017	The Duels	85.7	86.7	84.7	–	–	–
Rhythmatic^{1}^{2}	–	New York City, New York	Tap	July 11, 2017	The Duels	–	–	86.3	–	–	–
Rouge^{1}	–	Los Angeles, California	Hip-Hop/Jazz	July 11, 2017	The Duels	–	–	80.0	–	–	–
Stroll Groove^{1}	–	Los Angeles, California	Stepping	July 11, 2017	The Duels	–	–	81.3	–	–	–
Royal Flux^{1}	–	Los Angeles, California	Contemporary	June 27, 2017	The Duels	–	–	86.3	–	–	–
Miami All-Stars	–	Miami, Florida	Latin Jazz	June 20, 2017	The Duels	84.7	81.0	88.3	–	–	–
Fuze	–	Los Angeles, California	–	June 6, 2017	Qualifiers	77.3	77.3	–	–	–	–
Nxt Lvl	–	Myrtle Beach, South Carolina	Clogging	May 30, 2017	Qualifiers	77.0	77.0	–	–	–	–

^1 Despite their Qualifier performance not being shown, this act's hometown and dance style were made available on the World of Dance website. Therefore, these acts do not have a determined average score.
^2 MiniRequest, Kings Unite & Rhythmatic were the only groups not to have a full performance featured during their time on the show.

== Qualifiers ==
In each round of the Qualifiers, the dance acts will perform a 2-minute routine in front of the judges and a live audience. They will be scored by the judges in 5 categories: Performance, Technique, Choreography, Creativity & Presentation. Each category is worth 20 points with a perfect score of 100. For the dance act to progress forward, they must receive an average score of 80 or higher.

Color key:

Contestant was eliminated

=== Part 1: May 30 ===
Order	Name	Division	Performance Song	Judges' Score			
Order	Name	Division	Performance Song	Ne-Yo	Jennifer	Derek	AVERAGE
1	Super Cr3w	Team	"Viva La Vida" – Coldplay	87	89	88	88.0
2	D'Angelo & Amanda	Junior	"Run Boy Run" – Woodkid	90	88	87	88.3
3	Les Twins	Upper	"Free" – 6LACK	95	96	96	95.7
4	Nxt Lvl	Team	"Move" – Luke Bryan	73	78	80	77.0
5	Keone & Mari	Upper	"Happy" – C2C	85	83	87	85.0
6	Kinjaz	Team	"High For This" – Ellie Goulding	89	92	92	91.0
7	Diana Pombo	Junior	"Bird Set Free" – Sia	88	92	89	89.7

=== Part 2: June 6 ===
Order	Name	Division	Performance Song	Judges' Score			
Order	Name	Division	Performance Song	Ne-Yo	Jennifer	Derek	AVERAGE
1	The Lab	Junior	"Bad Boy for Life" – Puff Daddy	90	92	92	91.3
2	Fik-Shun	Upper	"Unsteady (Erich Lee Gravity Remix)" – X Ambassadors	90	92	91	91.0
3	Miami All Stars	Team	"Dance Again" – Jennifer Lopez	79	82	82	81.0
4	Luka & Jenalyn	Upper	"You Don't Own Me ft. G-Eazy" – Grace	83	89	88	86.7
5	Kaeli & Brandon	Junior	-	-	-	-	77.7
6	Fuze	Team	-	-	-	-	77.3
7	JJ & Joey	Junior	-	77	78	79	78.0
8	Quick Style	Upper	"Jolene" – Dolly Parton	85	88	87	86.7
9	Nick Daniels	Upper	"Secrets" – OneRepublic	85	89	87	87.0

=== Part 3: June 13 ===
Order	Name	Division	Performance Song	Judges' Score			
Order	Name	Division	Performance Song	Ne-Yo	Jennifer	Derek	AVERAGE
1	Jabbawockeez	Team	"Still Feelin' It" – Mistah F.A.B	85	89	86	86.7
2	The Mihacevich Sisters	Junior	"Warrior" – Demi Lovato	82	90	89	87.0
3	Boys of Temecula	Junior	"Canned Heat" – Jamiroquai	–	–	–	80.3
4	KynTay	Junior	"Panda" – Desiigner	–	–	–	85.7
5	Kyle Van Newkirk	Upper	"Don't Wanna Know" – Maroon 5 ft. Kendrick Lamar	–	–	–	80.7
6	Chapkis Dance Family	Team	"All the Way Up" – Fat Joe and Remy Ma	–	–	–	89.0
7	Pasión	Upper	–	–	–	–	87.7
8	The Posse	Junior	"Scars To Your Beautiful" – Alessia Cara	81	88	83	84.0
9	Swing Latino	Team	"Bemba Colora" – Celia Cruz	87	91	90	89.3
10	Ian Eastwood and the Young Lions	Team	"Chunky" – Bruno Mars	81	86	84	83.7
11	Vibration	Upper	–	–	–	–	78.0
12	801 Squad	Junior	"Fireball" – Pitbull ft. John Ryan	79	78	81	79.3
13	Trent Jeray	Upper	"Love You Now" – John Legend	77	82	79	79.3
14	DNA	Upper	"Powerful" – Major Lazer	82	88	88	86.0
15	Eva Igo	Junior	"River" – Bishop Briggs	85	89	90	88.0

== The Duels ==
In each round of The Duels, two acts in the same division compete for a spot in the next round. In each division, the acts with the top qualifying scores choose their opponents, then both acts perform back-to-back, receiving feedback from the judges. After each performance, the judges will score them in the 5 categories: Performance, Technique, Creativity, Choreography & Presentation. Unlike the Qualifiers, only the final average for each act is shown. The act with the highest average at the end of the duel moves on to the next round, the other faces immediate elimination.

Qualifying Acts
Rank	Upper		Team		Junior	
Rank	Name	Score	Name	Score	Name	Score
1	Les Twins	95.7	Kinjaz	91.0	The Lab	91.3
2	Fik-Shun	91.0	Swing Latino	89.3	Diana Pombo	89.7
3	Pasión	87.7	Chapkis Dance Family	89.0	D'Angelo & Amanda	88.3
4	Nick Daniels	87.0	Super Cr3w	88.0	Eva Igo	88.0
5	Luka & Jenalyn	86.7	Jabbawockeez	86.7	The Mihacevich Sisters	87.0
6	Quick Style	86.7	Ian Eastwood and the Young Lions	83.7	KynTay	85.7
7	DNA	86.0	Royal Flux	–	The Posse	84.0
8	Keone & Mari	85.0	Rouge	–	Immabeast	–
9	Kyle Van Newkirk	80.7	Miami All-Stars	81.0	Boys of Temecula	80.3
10	Kings Unite	–	Stroll Grove	–	Mini ReQuest	–
11	–	–	Rhythmatic	–	–	–

Song Not Shown	-

Episode	Order	Division	Dance Act	Performance Song	Judges Score	Winner
Part 1 (June 20)	1	Upper	Fik-Shun	"Fragile" – Tech N9ne	90.7	Fik-Shun
Part 1 (June 20)	1	Upper	Nick Daniels	"Wicked Game" – Raign	87.7	Fik-Shun
Part 1 (June 20)	2	Team	Swing Latino	"Pa Lante" – Jose Aguirre	91.7	Swing Latino
Part 1 (June 20)	2	Team	Miami All-Stars	"Jumpin' Jack" – Voodoo Daddy	88.3	Swing Latino
Part 1 (June 20)	3	Junior	KynTay	"Bang Bang" – Jessie J ft. Ariana Grande & Nicki Minaj	82.7	Eva Igo
Part 1 (June 20)	3	Junior	Eva Igo	"It's a Man's Man's Man's World" – Juliet Simms	89.0	Eva Igo
Part 1 (June 20)	4	Upper	Keone & Mari	"Like Real People Do" – Hozier	91.3	Keone & Mari
Part 1 (June 20)	4	Upper	Quick Style	"Guidance" – Travis Scott	89.3	Keone & Mari
Part 2 (June 27)	1	Junior	The Posse	"In the Name of Love" – Martin Garrix	86.0	Diana Pombo
Part 2 (June 27)	1	Junior	Diana Pombo	"Rise" – Katy Perry	91.3	Diana Pombo
Part 2 (June 27)	2	Team	Super Cr3w	"Workin' Day And Night" – Michael Jackson	89.0	Super Cr3w
Part 2 (June 27)	2	Team	Royal Flux	"Brother" – Matt Corby	86.3	Super Cr3w
Part 2 (June 27)	3	Junior	The Lab	"All I Do Is Win" – DJ Khaled	89.7	The Lab
Part 2 (June 27)	3	Junior	Boys of Temecula	"Shut Up and Dance" – Walk the Moon	84.7	The Lab
Part 2 (June 27)	4	Upper	Kyle Van Newkirk	"Classic Man" – Jidenna	86.0	Les Twins
Part 2 (June 27)	4	Upper	Les Twins	"Deep in the Bottom (of Africa)" – Monique Bingham	92.0	Les Twins
Part 3 (July 11)	1	Team	Kinjaz	"Change (Kinja Bang)" – TroyBoi	91.3	Kinjaz
Part 3 (July 11)	1	Team	Stroll Groove	"My Prerogative" – Bobby Brown	81.3	Kinjaz
Part 3 (July 11)	2	Upper	Luka & Jenalyn	"Don't Let Me Down" – The Chainsmokers	88.7	Luka & Jenalyn
Part 3 (July 11)	2	Upper	DNA	"Love Runs Out" – OneRepublic	80.3	Luka & Jenalyn
Part 3 (July 11)	3	Junior	Mini Request	–	85.7	Immabeast
Part 3 (July 11)	3	Junior	Immabeast	"Juice" – AD	86.0	Immabeast
Part 3 (July 11)	4	Upper	Kings Unite	–	83.7	Pasión
Part 3 (July 11)	4	Upper	Pasión	"Code Name Vivaldi" – The Piano Guys	87.3	Pasión
Part 3 (July 11)	5	Team	Rhythmatic	–	86.3	Chapkis Dance Family
Part 3 (July 11)	5	Team	Chapkis Dance Family	"Get Like Me" – Nelly	88.7	Chapkis Dance Family
Part 3 (July 11)	6	Junior	D'Angelo & Amanda	"Hip Hip Chin Chin" – Club des Belugas	78.7	The Mihacevich Sisters
Part 3 (July 11)	6	Junior	The Mihacevich Sisters	"Unstoppable" – Sia	81.0	The Mihacevich Sisters
Part 3 (July 11)	7	Team	Rouge	"Trini Dem Girls" – Nicki Minaj	80.0	Ian Eastwood and The Young Lions
Part 3 (July 11)	7	Team	Jabbawockeez	"Scenario" – A Tribe Called Quest	84.7	Ian Eastwood and The Young Lions
Part 3 (July 11)	7	Team	Ian Eastwood and the Young Lions	"Hot in Herre" – Nelly	85.7	Ian Eastwood and The Young Lions

== The Cut ==
In The Cut, the 15 remaining acts compete for two spots in each of their divisions. As each dance act competes, their final score is displayed on a leaderboard for their division. Once a dance act's score falls out of the top 2, they face immediate elimination. For this round, each of the judges became mentors for one of the divisions; Jennifer worked with the Juniors, Derek worked with the Upper acts and Ne-Yo worked with the Teams. Guest judge Misty Copeland joined the panel for this segment.

The Duels scores
Rank	Upper			Team			Junior		
Rank	Name	Score	Cut Rank	Name	Score	Cut Rank	Name	Score	Cut Rank
1	Les Twins	92.0	1	Swing Latino	91.7	2	Diana Pombo	91.3	2
2	Keone & Mari	91.3	2	Kinjaz	91.3	1	The Lab	89.7	3
3	Fik-Shun	90.7	3	Super Cr3w	89.0	4	Eva Igo	89.0	1
4	Luka & Jenalyn	88.7	4	Chapkis Dance Family	88.7	5	Immabeast	86.0	5
5	Pasión	87.3	5	Ian Eastwood and the Young Lions	85.7	3	The Mihacevich Sisters	81.0	4

Song/Score Not Shown	-

Episode	Order	Division	Dance Act	Performance Song	Judges' Score				
Episode	Order	Division	Dance Act	Performance Song	Ne-Yo	Jennifer	Misty	Derek	AVERAGE
Part 1 (July 18)	1	Junior	Diana Pombo	"Rise Up" – Andra Day	91	93	94	90	92.0
Part 1 (July 18)	2	Junior	ImmaBEAST	"Look At Me Now" – Chris Brown	–	–	–	–	84.2
Part 1 (July 18)	3	Junior	The Mihacevich Sisters	"Beautiful Thing" – Grace VanderWaal	84	85	85	88	85.5
Part 1 (July 18)	4	Junior	The Lab	"Disco Inferno" – 50 Cent	87	84	85	88	86.0
Part 1 (July 18)	5	Junior	Eva Igo	"Creep" – Ember Island	90	92	95	93	92.5
Part 1 (July 18)	6	Team	Swing Latino	"Welcome To The Party" – Har-You Percussion Group	91	93	93	93	92.5
Part 1 (July 18)	7	Team	Super Cr3w	"Let It Go" – James Bay	86	85	89	95	88.8
Part 2 (July 25)	1	Team	Kinjaz	"No Limit" – Usher	93	90	96	95	93.5
Part 2 (July 25)	2	Team	Chapkis Dance Family	"Work Bitch" – Britney Spears	–	–	–	–	85.8
Part 2 (July 25)	3	Team	Ian Eastwood and the Young Lions	"Have Mercy" – Eryn Allen Kane	83	89	93	91	89.0
Part 2 (July 25)	4	Upper	Luka & Jenalyn	"The Hills" – The Weeknd	82	80	80	80	80.5
Part 2 (July 25)	5	Upper	Fik-Shun	"7 Years" – Lukas Graham	84	86	82	85	84.2
Part 2 (July 25)	6	Upper	Pasión	"Livin' La Vida Loca" – Ricky Martin	–	–	–	–	78.8
Part 2 (July 25)	7	Upper	Les Twins	"Never Know" – 6LACK	90	94	98	92	93.5
Part 2 (July 25)	8	Upper	Keone & Mari	"Darkness And Light" – John Legend ft. Brittany Howard	94	92	94	93	93.2

== Divisional Final ==
In the Divisional Final, the 2 remaining acts in each division square off, with only one act going to the World Final to represent their division. Continuing from the previous round, each of the 3 judges acted as mentors for the divisions; Jennifer worked with the Teams, Ne-Yo worked with the Upper acts and Derek worked with the Juniors. Keone and Mari were awarded the first and only 100 score of the entire season by Ne-Yo during the Divisional Final.

The Cut Scores
Rank	Upper		Team		Junior	
Rank	Name	Score	Name	Score	Name	Score
1	Les Twins	93.5	Kinjaz	93.5	Eva Igo	92.5
2	Keone & Mari	93.2	Swing Latino	92.5	Diana Pombo	92.0

Order	Division	Dance Act	Performance Song	Judges' Score			
Order	Division	Dance Act	Performance Song	Ne-Yo	Jennifer	Derek	AVERAGE
1	Team	Kinjaz	"Work Song" – Hozier	91	91	95	92.3
2	Team	Swing Latino	"Gracias A La Vida" – Mercedes Sosa	95	95	94	94.7
3	Upper	Keone & Mari	"The Way You Look Tonight" – Frank Sinatra	100	90	95	95.0
4	Upper	Les Twins	"Some Minds" – Flume ft. Andrew Wyatt	99	99	95	97.7
5	Junior	Diana Pombo	"Wild Things" – Alessia Cara	90	89	89	89.3
6	Junior	Eva Igo	"Ready Or Not" – Mischa "Book" Chillak ft. Esthero	96	97	97	96.7

== World Final ==
In the World Final, the final 3 acts competed head to head to win the one million dollar prize. As with the previous 2 rounds, the judges became mentors for each of the finalists; Jennifer worked with Les Twins, Derek worked with Swing Latino and Ne-Yo worked with Eva. Each of the 3 finalists performed twice; The first performance's music was chosen by one of the judges and the second was chosen by the finalist. After each performance, the final scores were displayed on a leaderboard. The winner of the World Finals was determined by the judges combined average scores from both performances. After the final performances, Les Twins were announced as the winners of World of Dance; their final combined score of 93.9 just barely edged out Eva Igo by 0.2 points.

Order	Dance Act	Performance Song	Judges' Score			
Order	Dance Act	Performance Song	Ne-Yo	Jennifer	Derek	AVERAGE
1	Les Twins	"Stole The Show" – Kygo ft. Parson James	92	92	95	93.0
2	Swing Latino	"Conga" – Gloria Estefan	91	89	95	91.7
3	Eva Igo	"In the Air Tonight" – Natalie Taylor	90	90	93	91.0
4	Eva Igo	"Alive" – Sia	95	96	98	96.3
5	Swing Latino	"Magdalena, Mi Amor (Quimbara)" – DLG (Dark Latin Groove)	93	95	96	94.7
6	Les Twins	"Scream" – Michael Jackson & Janet Jackson	94	97	93	94.7

=== Final Scores ===
Les Twins (93.9)

Eva Igo (93.7)

Swing Latino (93.2)

== Contestants who appeared on other shows ==
- Several members of various dance acts have competed on the American version of So You Think You Can Dance. Nick Young, founder of Rhythmatic, competed on Season 8, making the Top 20. Audrey Case of Royal Flux competed on Season 9, making the Top 10. Du-Shaunt "Fik-Shun" Stegall is the male winner of Season 10. Diana Pombo auditioned for Season 13, getting cut in the callbacks.
- Denys Drozdyuk of DNA is the winner of Season 3 of So You Think You Can Dance Canada. DNA also auditioned for the US version in Season 12, where both were eliminated in the callbacks.
- Les Twins competed on Season 3 of Incroyable Talent.
- Jabbawockeez debuted on Season 2 of America's Got Talent. They were eliminated in the Las Vegas callbacks.
- Jabbawockeez & Super Cr3w have competed and won their respective seasons of America's Best Dance Crew. JabbaWockeez won Season 1 and Super Cr3w won Season 2.
- Kinjaz & Super Cr3w both competed on Season 8 of America's Best Dance Crew, reaching the finals (placing 2nd and 3rd respectively).
- Ian Eastwood of Ian Eastwood and the Young Lions competed as a member of Mos Wanted Crew on Season 7 of America's Best Dance Crew
- D'Angelo and Amanda appeared on Season 8 of America's Got Talent. They were eliminated after reaching the Top 12. Amanda also competed in Abby's Ultimate Dance Competition season 1 placing 4th.
- Nick Daniels appeared on Dance Moms as a part of the candy apples team.

== Highest Scoring Dances ==
Name	Division	Round	Judges' Scores				
Name	Division	Round	Ne-Yo	Jennifer	Misty	Derek	AVERAGE
Les Twins	Upper	Divisional Final	99	99	–	95	97.7
Eva Igo	Junior	Divisional Final	96	97	–	97	96.7
Eva Igo	Junior	World Final	95	96	–	98	96.3
Les Twins	Upper	Qualifiers	95	96	–	96	95.7
Keone & Mari	Upper	Divisional Final	100	90	–	95	95.0
Swing Latino	Team	Divisional Final	95	95	–	94	94.7
Swing Latino	Team	World Final	93	95	–	96	94.7
Les Twins	Upper	World Final	94	97	–	93	94.7
Kinjaz	Team	The Cut	93	90	96	95	93.5
Les Twins	Upper	The Cut	90	94	98	92	93.5
Keone & Mari	Upper	The Cut	94	92	94	93	93.3
Les Twins	Upper	World Final	92	92	–	95	93.0

== Ratings ==
Show	Episode title	First air date	Timeslot (EDT)	Rating (18–49)	Share (18–49)	Viewers (millions)	Nightly rank
1	The Qualifiers 1	May 30, 2017	Tuesday 10:00 p.m.	2.4	9	9.71	2
2	The Qualifiers 2	June 6, 2017	Tuesday 10:00 p.m.	1.9	7	8.42	2
3	The Qualifiers 3	June 13, 2017	Tuesday 10:00 p.m.	1.9	8	8.04	2
4	The Duels 1	June 20, 2017	Tuesday 10:00 p.m.	1.8	7	7.61	2
5	The Duels 2	June 27, 2017	Tuesday 10:00 p.m.	1.8	8	7.51	2
6	The Duels 3	July 11, 2017	Tuesday 10:00 p.m.	1.7	7	7.08	2
7	The Cut 1	July 18, 2017	Tuesday 10:00 p.m.	1.6	7	6.91	2
8	The Cut 2	July 25, 2017	Tuesday 10:00 p.m.	1.6	7	6.88	2
9	Divisional Final	August 1, 2017	Tuesday 10:00 p.m.	1.7	7	7.00	2
10	World Final	August 8, 2017	Tuesday 10:00 p.m.	1.9	8	8.00	2
