= Eva Igo =

American dancer and actress (born 2002)

- Born: Eva Igo; November 9, 2002 (age 23); Saint Paul, Minnesota, U.S.
- Occupations: Dancer; Actress; YouTuber
- Years active: 2007–present
- Height: 5 ft 6 in (1.68m) at the age of 20
- Website: https://www.evaigoofficial.com

Eva Igo (born November 9, 2002) is an American dancer and actress. She debuted as a dancer on NBC's World of Dance first season, where she finished as runner-up to Les Twins. She specializes in dance styles such as jazz, contemporary, lyrical, musical theatre, and technique.

== Personal life ==
Igo was born and raised in Saint Paul, Minnesota. She started dancing at three years old at Larkin Dance Studio in Maplewood, Minnesota, and she was competing by age five.

== Career ==
In 2017, at the age of fourteen, Igo competed in the first season of NBC's World of Dance. She finished second to Les Twins by 0.1 points and came first in the Junior Division. She returned in Season 2.

Following her participation in World of Dance, she performed across the United States and Canada on the World of Dance LIVE Tour in 2017 and headlined at VidCon 2018.

Igo was also featured in Jennifer Lopez's music video, "Amor, Amor, Amor," directed by Jessy Terrero.

She won the Industry Dance Awards for "Most Fierce Dancer Under 18". She was also nominated for a People's Choice Award as the "Competition Contestant of 2018".

In 2019, Igo made a guest appearance on Season 5 of Dance Plus in Mumbai.

Igo worked with Welling Films in AXI: Avengers of Xtreme Illusions, alongside actors/dancers Preslee Bishop, Chloe Klitus, and Darrin Dewitt Henson. She made her feature film debut in 2018, starring in The Last Astronaut, directed by Shawn Welling. She won "Rising Star" at WorldFest Houston in 2019 for her role as Evena in The Last Astronaut.

Igo is a teaching artist working with dancers across the continental United States. She is currently faculty at Ultimate Dance Tour, and teaches with Librate Artists.
