= Scott Evans (host) =

American television host

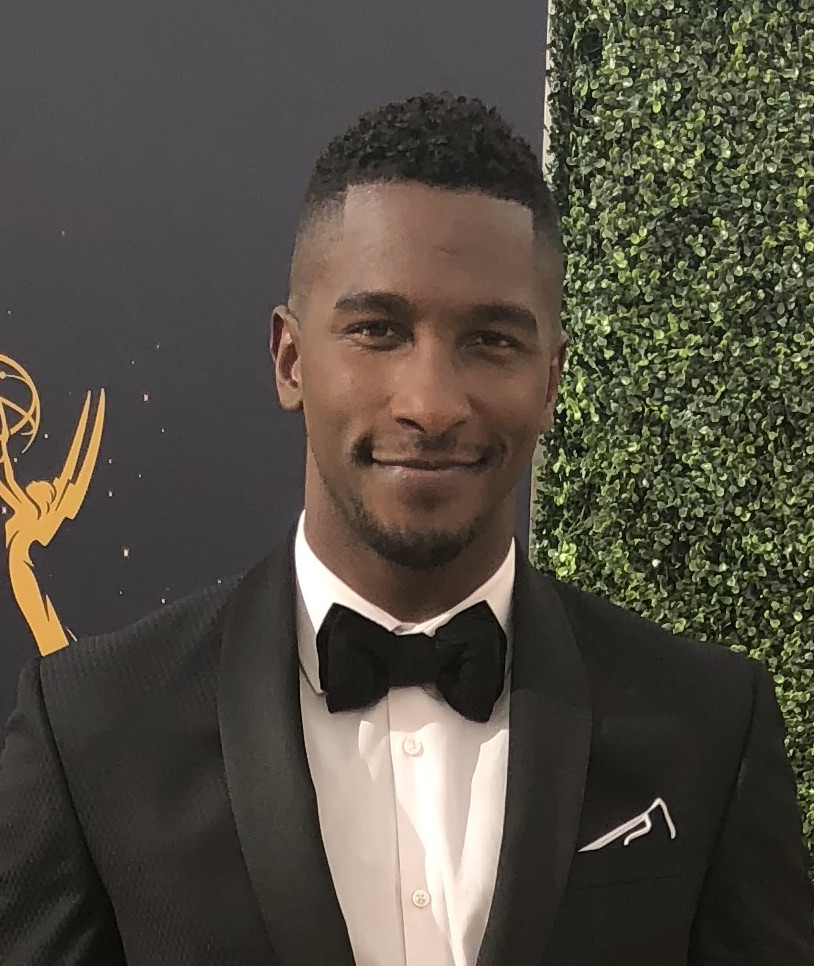
- Evans in 2018
- Born: December 1, 1986 (age 39); New Jersey, United States
- Occupation: Television personality
- Years active: 2012-present
- Notable credit: Access Hollywood (2015–2026)

Scott Evans (born December 1, 1986) is an American television personality, best known as a co-anchor for Access Hollywood. Evans previously served as the east coast correspondent, but as of September 2017, is working out of the Los Angeles office. He joined the NBC show World of Dance as the host for the third and fourth seasons. Evans credits sports television host and reporter, Stacy Paetz for getting him into the television business.

== Career ==
Previously, Evans was the host and MC at the home games for NBA's Indiana Pacers and WNBA's Indiana Fever.

From 2012 to 2015, Evans was a Channel One News anchor.

Evans took over hosting duties from Jenna Dewan for the third season NBC's World of Dance.

In November 2021, Evans signed an overall talent and development deal with NBCUniversal.

House Guest (ft. Scott Evans) won the Webby Award for Interview, Talk & After-Show, Series & Channels (Video & Film)

== Filmography ==
Television series
| Year | Title | Role | Notes |
|---|---|---|---|
| 2012-2015 | Channel One News | Himself | Anchor |
| 2015–2026 | Access Hollywood | Himself | Senior correspondent |
| 2017 | Power | Partygoer | Episode: "That Ain't Me" |
| 2019–2022 | Access Daily | Himself | Co-host |
| 2019–2020 | World of Dance | Himself | Host |
| 2021 | America's Big Deal | Himself | Host |
| 2021 | Holiday in Santa Fe | Matt | Television movie |
| 2023 | Black Pop: Celebrating The Power Of Black Culture | Himself | Docuseries |
| 2023 | Ladies of the '80s: A Divas Christmas | Tommy Johnson | Television movie |
| 2024 | Couple to Throuple | Himself | Host |
