= Access Hollywood =

American entertainment news program

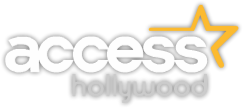
- Logo used from 2007 to 2015.
- Also known as: Access
- Genre: Entertainment news
- Created by: Jim Van Messel
- Presented by: Kit Hoover; Mario Lopez; Scott Evans
- Country of origin: United States
- Original language: English
- No. of seasons: 30
- No. of episodes: 11,844 (7,045 weeknights, 1,409 weekend, 3,390 weekdays)

Production
- Executive producers: Robert K. Silverstein (1999–2019); Maureen FitzPatrick (2019–2023); Michael Marson (2023–2026)
- Running time: 20 minutes (weeknights); 42 minutes (weekends/days)
- Production companies: NBC Studios (seasons 1–5); New World/Genesis Distribution (1996–1997) (season 1); 20th Television (1997–1999) (seasons 1–3); Warner Bros. Television Distribution (1999–2001) (seasons 3–5); NBC Enterprises (2001–2004) (seasons 6–8); NBCUniversal Television Distribution (2004–2021) (seasons 9–25); NBCUniversal Syndication Studios (season 25–30)

Original release
- Network: Syndication
- Release: September 9, 1996 – September 11, 2026

Access Hollywood (briefly known as Access from 2017 to 2019) is an American weekday television entertainment news program that aired from September 9, 1996, to September 11, 2026. It covers events and celebrities in the entertainment industry. It was created by former Entertainment Tonight executive producer Jim Van Messel and is currently executive produced by Maureen FitzPatrick and directed by Richard Plotkin. In previous years, Doug Dougherty, Christopher A. Berry and Kim Anastasia directed the program. Access Hollywood primarily focuses on news in the music, television, and film industries.

== History ==
Last logo from the first Access Hollywood era, from 2015 to 2017.

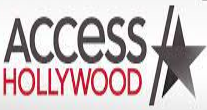
Logo from 2019 to 2022.

Access Hollywood aired nationally on various local stations, most of them affiliates of NBC, in the United States since September 9, 1996. It was previously produced by NBC Studios and has changed distributors over the years, first with New World/Genesis Distribution, then 20th Television (after News Corporation bought New World), followed by Warner Bros. Domestic Television Distribution who still distributes the show today via barter ad-sales, and then to NBC Enterprises when the network started up its own syndication division. Today, NBCUniversal Television Distribution, in association with NBC's owned-and-operated station KNBC has been solely responsible for its production and distribution since 2004. Warner Bros. continued its involvement with the program by having responsibilities for barter ad sales for Access Hollywood.

On September 13, 2010, Access Hollywood began broadcasting in high definition. On May 1, 2012, NBCUniversal Television Distribution announced it would renew Access Hollywood for three additional years through the 2014–15 season.

The program changed its name to simply Access on December 11, 2017.

On August 22, 2019, it was officially announced that Access and Access Live would receive an on-air refresh for their 24th and 10th seasons, respectively, with new names, logos, graphics and theme music, starting on September 9. Access returned to its original Access Hollywood name and begin airing live in the East Coast, with Access Live also rebranding as Access Daily. The program also debuted a second spin-off in the fall entitled All Access — which featured long-form reports on true-crime and human interest stories and aired initially on six NBC owned-and-operated stations. Former Extra host Mario Lopez also joined all three programs as co-host; All Access ended in June 2021.

On April 12, 2021, Access Hollywood and Access Daily were both renewed for four additional seasons through 2025. In 2024, they were renewed through 2026.

On March 13, 2026, it was announced that Access Hollywood and Access Daily would both be cancelled due to NBCUniversal's decision to end all first-run syndication programs produced by the network; the programs continued to produce new episodes until September 2026. Access Hollywood concluded over two days, with a September 10 retrospective episode featuring the hosts and on September 11 with the final episode covering the 25th anniversary of the 9/11 attacks.

== On-air staff ==
- Kit Hoover – anchor (2010–2026)
- Mario Lopez – anchor (2019–2026)
- Scott Evans – anchor/weekend anchor (2019–2026; previously served as senior correspondent from 2015 to 2019)
- Zuri Hall - weekend anchor/correspondent (2019–2026)
- Jason Kennedy – correspondent
- Tim Vincent – European correspondent (2005–2026)
- Michelle Beadle – correspondent (2012–2014; later at ESPN)
- Billy Bush – correspondent (2001–2004), anchor/voice over/executive producer (2004–2016; later at NBC's Today and Extra, now host of Hot Mics with Billy Bush)
- Steven "Cojo" Cojocaru – fashion correspondent (2000–2003, later at Entertainment Tonight)
- Giselle Fernández – weekday anchor/correspondent (1996–1999)
- Liz Hernandez - correspondent (2014–2017)
- Jill Martin - guest correspondent (2011–2013; now contributor on NBC News' weekday morning program Today)
- Larry Mendte – weekday/weekend anchor (1996–1997, now a public-affairs host for two TV stations in the Northeast and a host at WABC)
- Maria Menounos – correspondent (2005–2011; later at Extra and E! News)
- Natalie Morales – anchor (2016–2019; later at CBS as co-host of The Talk, now at CBS News)
- Nancy O'Dell – weekday/weekend anchor/correspondent (1996–2009, later at Entertainment Tonight and PEOPLE, The TV Show!, now host of Crime Exposé with Nancy O'Dell)
- Pat O'Brien – weekday/weekend anchor/correspondent (1997–2004, later at The Insider; now co-host of Adult Swim's entertainment variety program: Hot Package)
- Amy Powell - correspondent (2013–2018)
- Jeff Probst – correspondent (1996–1998; now host of Survivor)
- Tony Potts – weekend anchor/correspondent (1999–2011; now at CNN and HLN)
- Shaun Robinson – weekend anchor/correspondent (1999–2015)
- Sibley Scoles – weekend anchor/correspondent (2019–2021)
- Liliana Vazquez - fashion correspondent (2015–2019; later co-anchor of E! News)

== Segments ==
- Access Hollywood Nation, which is a viewer's choice allowing a choice of which stories will be carried in the show.
- In Case You Missed It, a recap of the previous night/weekend in pop culture, including film, television and music.
- Watch This, suggestion segment of films and shows to watch by the show's correspondents and critics.
- The Final 45, a closing credits segment with a quick rundown of the day's news.
- Access Express, a segment matching the defunct Entertainment Tonight segment "Real or Rumor?" where stories are confirmed or debunked.

=== Access Across America ===
In 2005, Access Hollywood went on a month-long roadtrip called Access Across America while the studio underwent a major overhaul. The show's new set was done in pastel colors with a modern flair, separating its look from other similar shows, including rival Entertainment Tonight. The new look also included a brand-new graphics package. Access Hollywood was taped at Studio 1 at The Burbank Studios (formerly NBC Studios) in Burbank, California, former home of The Tonight Show Starring Johnny Carson. With Days of Our Lives, it was one of two remaining NBC-produced programs as of 2014 originating from Burbank; On 2015 Access Hollywood moved to Universal City, California and Universal Studios Hollywood as NBC's operations continued to combine in Universal City.

== Spin-offs ==
The program has had some short-lived spin-offs in the last few years, including AMC Access for the AMC channel, and Real Access (the first teen-oriented entertainment news program, and the only attempt so far at an entertainment news program aimed at teens on television) for The N and Nickelodeon. The network most recently produced the African-American oriented TV One Access for the TV One cable channel. The programs formerly did entertainment segments for NBCUniversal's cable news channel titled Access MSNBC, though these have been withdrawn as MSNBC's news coverage has become mainly political.

=== Access Daily with Mario & Kit ===
Access Hollywood
- Also known as: Access Hollywood Live (2010–2017); Access Live (2017–2019)
- Presented by: Mario Lopez (2019–2026); Kit Hoover (2010–2026); Scott Evans (2019–2022)
- Country of origin: United States
- Original language: English
- No. of seasons: 15

Production
- Production locations: 10 Universal City Plaza; Universal City, Los Angeles, California
- Running time: 42 minutes
- Production company: KNBC

Original release
- Network: Syndicated
- Release: September 13, 2010 – September 10, 2026

A spin-off of Access Hollywood, called Access Hollywood Live, debuted on September 13, 2010. The daytime talk show hosted by Mario Lopez and Kit Hoover, featured entertainment news stories and in-studio guests. The program was initially seen only on NBC owned-and-operated stations in six markets and Fox owned-and-operated stations in six other major markets, all on stations that already carry the flagship series; since September 2011, the program also began being distributed to non-network owned stations that also carry the flagship series. The show airs live at 11:00 am Eastern Time (8:00 am in Los Angeles where the studios are located). The show changed its name to Access Live on December 11, 2017, and again to Access Daily on September 9, 2019. In 2022, the show was renamed Access Daily with Mario & Kit and Evans was no longer a co-host but still with the show as a correspondent.

Access Daily was originally recorded at The Burbank Studios in Burbank, California; it later broadcast from 10 Universal City Plaza in Universal City, California, where it was recorded since June 2015. On occasion, the program broadcast shows on location outside Studio 1A on the Today plaza at Rockefeller Center in New York City. On May 1, 2012, along with Access Hollywood's renewal for three additional seasons, NBCUniversal Television Distribution announced it would give Access Hollywood Live a third season renewal for the 2012–13 season. On April 12, 2021, the show renewed for a three additional seasons through 2025. In June 2024, the show was renewed through 2026.

=== All Access ===
A second spin-off, entitled, All Access premiered on September 9, 2019, and featured long-form reports on true-crime and human interest stories and aired initially on six NBC owned-and-operated stations. The show was hosted by Mario Lopez, Kit Hoover and Scott Evans with Sibley Scoles as correspondent. On October 2, 2019, Zuri Hall joined as co-host. On March 11, 2021, it was announced that the show had been canceled and the last episode would air in June.

== International versions & airings ==
In Canada, Rogers Sports & Media's Omni Television airs the United States version of Access Live while Independent station CHCH-DT began airing the half hour weekday United States version in fall 2014; Bell Media channel CTV 2 used to air the half hour weekday United States version since fall 2011 but it was discontinued in 2013.

The United Kingdom version began in 2003 hosted by Kate Garraway and Tim Vincent.

There was a short-lived Irish version on Channel 6 (now Virgin Media Two), hosted by Jenny Buckley in 2006.

== Spoofs ==
- The show was parodied in the show Arthur in the special Arthur, It's Only Rock n' Roll when a spoof named Access Elwood interviewed the band U Stink.
- In the South Park episode "Free Hat", a show airs called Excess Hollywood with a look-alike of then host Pat O'Brien.
- The show is also parodied in the sitcom BoJack Horseman as Excess Hollywood, later renamed to Excess Hollywoo after BoJack steals the D from the Hollywood Sign.
- Craig Ferguson often parodied Access Hollywood on The Late Late Show with Craig Ferguson in a segment called Access Extratainment Tonight (a portmanteau of Access Hollywood, Extra and Entertainment Tonight) with Ferguson as "Barney Slash".
- In The Simpsons Movie, the show is mentioned in an argument between Homer and Marge Simpson when they are in Alaska.
- In The Simpsons episode "Hello Gutter, Hello Fadder", when (then) hosts Pat O'Brien & Nancy O'Dell guest star as hosts of Access Springfield.

== See also ==
- Donald Trump Access Hollywood tape
- Entertainment Tonight
