= Pashminna – Dhaage Mohabbat Ke =

Indian romantic drama television series

- Written by: Nikita Dhond
- Screenplay by: Janaki Vishwanathan
- Story by: Bhavna Vyas
- Directed by: Vikram Labhe; Deepak Chavan
- Starring: See below
- Country of origin: India
- Original language: Hindi
- No. of seasons: 1
- No. of episodes: 130

Production
- Producers: Siddharth P. Malhotra; Sapna Malhotra
- Cinematography: Sandeep Yadav
- Camera setup: Multi camera
- Running time: 20-23 minutes
- Production company: Alchemy Films Private Limited

Original release
- Network: Sony SAB
- Release: 25 October 2023 – 23 March 2024

Pashminna – Dhaage Mohabbat Ke (transl. Pashminna – Threads Of Love) is an Indian Hindi-language romantic drama television series that aired from 25 October 2023 to 23 March 2024 on Sony SAB. Produced by Siddharth P. Malhotra and Sapna Malhotra under Alchemy Films Private Limited, it starred Nishant Singh Malkani, Isha Sharma, Hiten Tejwani and Gauri Pradhan.

== Cast ==
=== Main ===
- Isha Sharma as Pashminna Suri Sharma: Preeti and Avinash's daughter; Ayesha's half-sister; Paras and Rishi's ex-fiancée; Raghav's wife (2023–2024)
- Nishant Singh Malkani as Raghav Kaul: Moina and Atul's son; Reeva and Ruhaan's brother; Ayesha's best friend and ex-fiancé; Pashminna's husband (2023–2024)
- Hiten Tejwani as Avinash Sharma: Preeti's ex-lover; Ayesha and Pashminna's father (2023–2024)
- Gauri Pradhan as Preeti Suri: Avinash's ex-lover; Pashminna's mother (2023–2024)

=== Recurring ===
- Beena Banerjee as Mrs. Kaul: Atul's mother; Reeva, Raghav and Ruhaan's grandmother (2023–2024)
- Angad Hasija as Paras Durani: Kailash's son; Pashminna's one sided lover (2023–2024)
- Shadab Khan as Kailash Durani: Paras's father (2023–2024)
- Kusum Tikoo as Baby Mami: Umashankar's wife (2023–2024)
- Shashi Bhushan as Umashankar Mama: Baby's husband (2023–2024)
- Rinku Worah as Guddi (2024)
- Ayushi Bhatia as Fatima "Kaju": Pashminna's friend (2023–2024)
- Krissann Barretto as Ayesha Sharma: Avinash's daughter; Pashminna’s half-sister; Raghav's best friend ex-fiancé (2023–2024)
- Rakesh Paul as Atul Kaul: Moina's husband; Reeva, Raghav and Ruhaan's father (2023–2024)
- Vishavpreet Kaur as Moina Kaul: Atul's wife; Reeva, Raghav and Ruhaan's mother (2023–2024)
- Anuj Khurana as Suneel Manchanda: Reeva's husband (2023–2024)
- Ankita Singh Bamb as Reeva Suneel Manchanda (nee Kaul): Atul and Moina's daughter; Raghav and Ruhaan's elder sister; Suneel's wife (2023–2024)
- Vidhaan Sharma as Child Ruhaan Kaul: Atul and Moina's younger son; Reeva and Raghav's younger brother (2023–2024)
- Leenesh Mattoo as Rishi: A film maker; Raghav's childhood friend; Pashminna's ex-fiancée (2024)

== Production ==
=== Casting ===
Initially Kanikka Kapur was approached to play the female lead. Later, Nishant Singh Malkani and Isha Sharma were signed as the lead. The series also marks the seventh collaboration between real life couple Hiten Tejwani and Gauri Pradhan Tejwani after Kutumb, Kyunki Saas Bhi Kabhi Bahu Thi, Kaisa Ye Pyar Hai, Kya Hadsaa Kya Haqeeqat, Kumkum – Ek Pyara Sa Bandhan and Nach Baliye 2.

=== Development ===
The series was announced by Alchemy Films Private Limited on Sony SAB. It is also the second television series to be shot in Kashmir after Gul Gulshan Gulfaam (1987).

=== Filming ===
The series is set in Kashmir, principal photography commenced from August 2023 in Srinagar, Kashmir, with some initial sequences shot at Kashmir Valley and Dal Lake. It is mainly shot at the Film City, Mumbai.

== See also ==
- List of programmes broadcast by Sony SAB
