= Santram Varma =

Indian director, producer and screenwriter (born 1970)

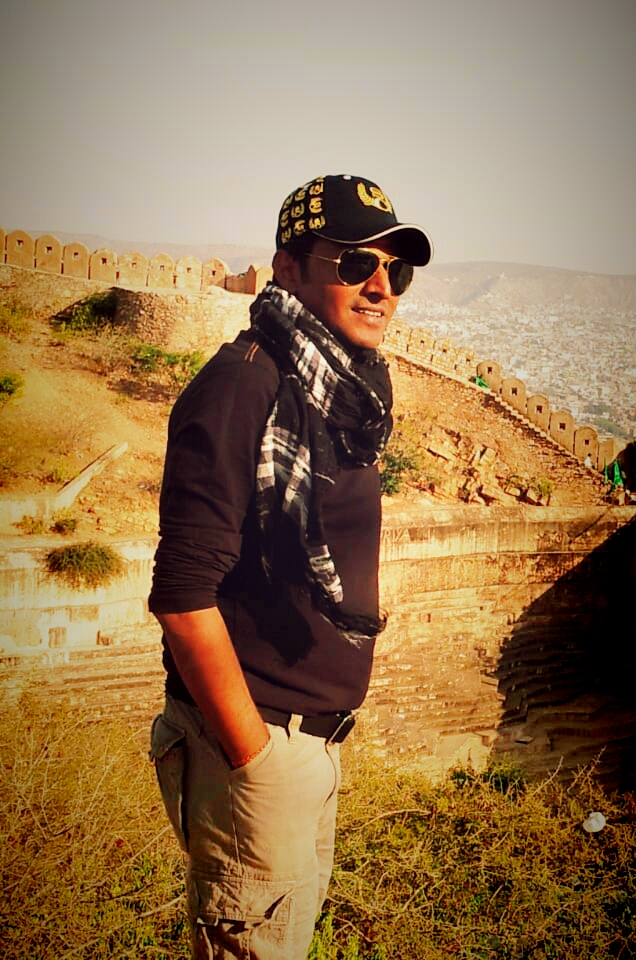
- Santram Varma, Second Day at the Shoot of Jodha Akbar
- Born: 1970 (age 55–56)
- Occupations: director producer screenwriter
- Notable work: Krishna Cottage (2004); Virrudh (2007); Jodha Akbar (2013); Naagin (2015 TV series)

Santram Varma (born 1970) is an Indian film and television director, producer and screenwriter, known for his works in Hindi television and cinema. His most notable works include Krishna Cottage, Virrudh, Jodha Akbar, and Naagin (2015 TV series).

== Serials ==
STAR PLUS

- Kyunki Saas Bhi Kabhi Bahu Thi
- Kaahin Kissii Roz
- Kasautii Zindagii Kay
- Tere Liye
- Ek Hazaaron Mein Meri Behna Hai
- Ruk Jaana Nahin
- Kahiin to Hoga
- Kis Desh Mein Hai Meraa Dil
- Teri Meri Love Stories
- Dekho Magar Pyaar Se
- Thodi Si Zameen Thoda Sa Aasmaan
- Koi Laut Ke Aaya Hai
- Chandra Nandini
- Karam Apnaa Apnaa
- Karma

ZEE TV

- X Zone
- Thriller at 10
- Amanat
- Keshav Pandit
- Kasamh Se
- Waaris
- Tashan-e-Ishq
- Jodha Akbar
- Ek Tha Raja Ek Thi Rani
- Tashan-e-Ishq
- Laal Ishq

SONY TV

- Aahat
- Kkusum
- Kutumb
- Cats
- C.I.D.
- Aahat 2
- Ye Meri Life Hai
- Kya Hadsaa Kya Haqeeqat
- Virrudh
- Encounter
- CID
- Itna Karo Na Mujhe Pyaar
- Rihaee

NDTV

- Bandini
- Kahaani Hamaaray Mahaabhaarat Ki
- Mere Apne

COLORS TV

- Koi Aane Ko Hai
- Naagin
- Kavach...Kaali Shaktiyon Se
- Kavach...Mahashivratri

SAB TV

- I Luv My India
- Khauf
- Dial 100
- Ichhapyaari Naagin
- Shree Adi Manav

LIFE OK

- Junoon – Aisi Nafrat Toh Kaisa Ishq
- Piya Rangrezz
- Ajeeb Daastaan Hai Ye

STAR ONE

- Darna Mana Hai

B4U

- Dahashat

ZEE MARATHI

- Shree Tashi Sau (Produced)

== Awards and nominations ==
Year	Award	Category	Work	Result
2005	RAPA	Best Director	Rihaee (TV series)	Won
2007	Indian Television Academy Awards	Best Director	Virrudh	Won
2014	Producers Guild Film Awards	Best Director	Jodha Akbar	Won
2014	7th Boroplus Gold Award	Best Director	Jodha Akbar	Won

== Films ==
=== Director ===
- Krishna Cottage (Balaji Telefilms)
- Satti Par Satto (T-Square Telefilms)List of Gujarati films of 2018

=== Associate Producer ===
- Paying Guests (Mukta Arts)
