= Gauri Pradhan =

Indian television actress

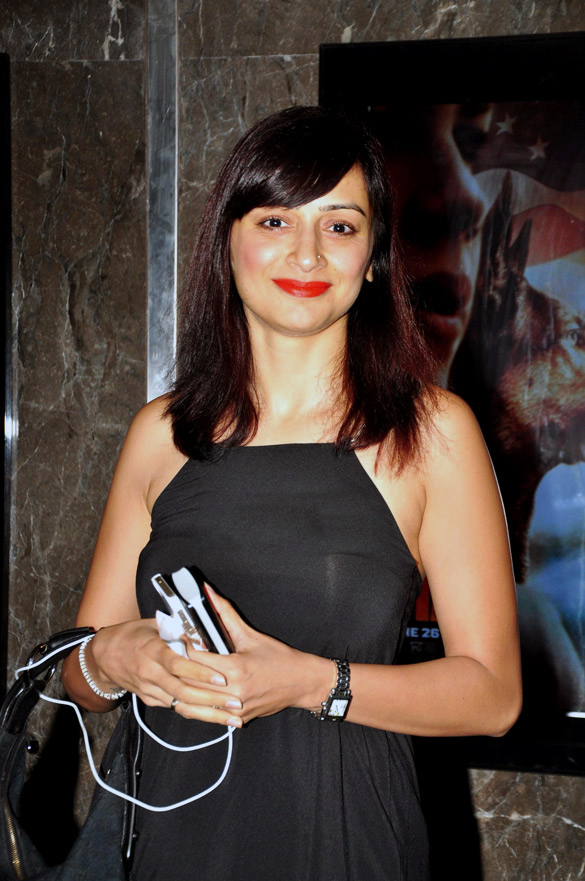
- Pradhan in 2017
- Born: Gauri Pradhan; 16 September; Jammu, Jammu and Kashmir, India
- Occupations: Businesswoman; model; actress
- Years active: 2000–present
- Known for: Kutumb; Kyunki Saas Bhi Kabhi Bahu Thi; Special Squad; Left Right Left; Tu Aashiqui
- Spouse: Hiten Tejwani (m. 2004)
- Children: 2

Gauri Pradhan Tejwani (born 16 September) is an Indian actress and model who primarily works in Hindi television. Pradhan is best recognised for her portrayal of Gauri Agarwal Mittal in Kutumb, Nandini Thakkar Virani in Kyunki Saas Bhi Kabhi Bahu Thi, Dr. Deepika Ghosh in Special Squad, Captain Shona Das in Left Right Left and Anita Sharma in Tu Aashiqui.

== Early life and education ==
Pradhan spent her former years in Jammu, Jammu and Kashmir, India in Marathi family. Her father Major Subhash Vasudeo Pradhan is a retired Indian Army Officer and her mother Asha is a homemaker. Pradhan is the second of three siblings; her elder brother Bharat, is a petrochemical engineer, while her younger sister Geetanjali, is a M.D. Pradhan is the only one in her family to have pursued modelling and acting as a career.

Her childhood was spent travelling throughout the country owing to the nature of her father's job. As a result, she studied in different schools, one of them was the Carmel Convent School in Udhampur. After her father's retirement, the family settled in Pune (Maharashtra), where she attended Sir Parshurambhau College for a course in BSc (Electronics). Later she enrolled for a course in psychology from an institute affiliated with University of London.

== Career ==
=== Modelling career (1995–1998) ===
Pradhan's modelling stint commenced at age 18, primarily in Pune. In 1998, while still in her second year of a BSc course she moved to Mumbai to take part in Femina Miss India. She along with Smriti Irani are those contestants who reached great stardom on TV. Dipannita Sharma was also a contestants and made it to top 5. She did a lot of ramp shows and has done television commercials for many well known companies such as Sprite, Bru, Dabur, Pond's, Santoor, Colgate, Philips, Breeze, etc.

=== Debut, breakthrough and success (1999–2009) ===
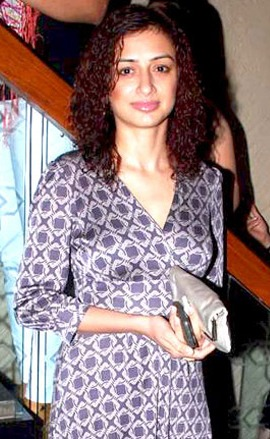
Pradhan Tejwani at an event

Pradhan made her acting debut with the historical tele-series Noorjahan which was telecasted in Doordarshan in 1999. She never thought of becoming an actor, but when Cinevistaas offered her the lead role in Noor Jahan, she decided to give it a shot.

She also appeared in three music videos (which were Talat Aziz's Khubsoorat, Hans Raj Hans's Jhanjar, and Sonu Nigam's Yaad) during the year 2000 to 2001.

In October 2001, Pradhan rose to fame with tele-series Kutumb on Sony TV where she played the lead role of Gauri Agarwal Mittal and the channel & production house brought the second season of the show, Kutumb, with the same leads. Soon after in 2003, she did an episodic role as Shweta in Krishna Arjun on Star Plus, and she then appeared in another family drama named Naam Gum Jayegaa on Sony TV as the female lead Priyanka Singh. In 2003, she also appeared as Mayuri / Gauri in the horror tele-series Kya Hadsaa Kya Haqeeqat. In 2002, she participated in one of the episodes of the singing reality show Kisme Kitna Hai Dum on Star Plus along with other television actors.

After a string of cameos and a short series, Pradhan was approached in 2004 to play the lead as Nandini Thakkar in Kyunki Saas Bhi Kabhi Bahu Thi on Star Plus. In the same year, she appeared in Isse Kehte Hai Golmaal Ghar that aired on Sahara One channel as the main lead opposite Manav Gohil. The series premiered on 30 October 2004, and aired every Saturday at 8:30 p.m. IST.

In March 2005, she entered the show Special Squad on Star One as the Forensic Expert and Special Squad head Dr. Deepika Ghosh. Pradhan has also made special appearances in other Indian series like Rihaee and Jassi Jaissi Koi Nahin on Sony TV.

In 2006, she participated in reality shows such as Nach Baliye 2 (a celebrity couple dance reality show) and Jodee Kamaal Ki (a celebrity couple game show) on Star One along with her husband Hiten Tejwani, and played the part of Kanan in the romantic drama-series Kaisa Ye Pyar Hai.

In May 2008, she entered the youth oriented show Left Right Left (that aired on SAB TV) as Captain Shona Das, an army consultant. In that vary year, she along with her husband Hiten Tejwani appeared as contestant in two reality shows; Kabhi Kabhii Pyaar Kabhi Kabhii Yaar and Kya Aap Paanchvi Pass Se Tez Hain?. In 2008, Pradhan and her husband also hosted some of the episodes of the celebrity couple dance reality show Nach Baliye 4 on Star Plus.

In 2009, Pradhan did a long cameo in Star Plus's afternoon long-running hit show Kumkum – Ek Pyara Sa Bandhan as Aditi Kapoor along with her husband.

=== Later career and supporting parts (2010–present) ===
After having twins, Pradhan took a five-year break from television and decided not to work till her children turned four. During her break, she pursued her passion for porcelain painting. She learned about this form of painting under Sangita Shetty Chowhan. Gauri is also one of the partners of the company called Colours On Fire, owned by Chowhan.

In 2010, Pradhan along with her husband opened a restro-bar named Barcode 053 (a franchise of Crepe Station Café) at Andheri in Mumbai. In the same year she also appeared in one of the episodes of the female celebrity game show Meethi Choori No 1 which aired on NDTV Imagine.

In 2014, after a long hiatus of five years, she made her comeback on television with Ekta Kapoor's show, Meri Aashiqui Tumse Hi (which aired on Colors TV) as Falguni Parekh. From 2017 to 2018, she played the role of Anita Sharma on Colors TV's show Tu Aashiqui. From 2023 to 2024, she played the role of Preeti Suri on SAB TV's show Pashminna – Dhaage Mohabbat Ke.

Since July 2025, she has been reprising her role of Nandini Virani in the StarPlus's spiritual sequel of Kyunki Saas Bhi Kabhi Bahu Thi, entitled Kyunki Saas Bhi Kabhi Bahu Thi 2.

== Personal life ==
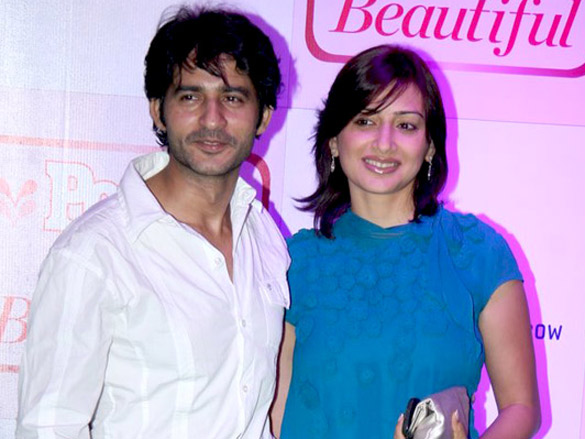
Pradhan with husband Hiten Tejwani at an event in 2012

Pradhan met her husband Hiten Tejwani in Hyderabad while shooting for a commercial for Breeze soap. Later on, they met on the sets of tele-series Kutumb and were coincidentally cast as the lead pair. The onscreen chemistry led to the brewing of romance between them and they started dating. While playing the characters of star crossed lovers Karan and Nandini in another daily soap Kyunki Saas Bhi Kabhi Bahu Thi, they decided to get married.

After two years of courtship, they got married as per Maharashtrian customs at a private ceremony in the Sun-n-Sand Hotel in Pune on 29 April 2004, with about 40–50 guests in attendance. Soon after they went to Ko Samui in Thailand for honeymoon. Their reception was held at Juhu's Army Club on 9 May 2004, with over 400 guests.

On 11 November 2009, they became parents to twins, a son Nevaan and daughter Katya.

== Filmography ==
=== Films ===
Year	Title	Role	Notes	Ref.
2008	C Kkompany	Herself	Special appearance	
2023	A Winter Tale At Shimla	Vaidehi		

=== Television ===
Year	Title	Role	Notes	Ref.
2000–2001	Noorjahan	Noor Jahan		
2001–2002	Kutumb	Gauri Agarwal Mittal		
2002–2003	Kutumb	Gauri Pradhan Mann / Shweta Chattopadhyay Mann		
2002	Krishna Arjun	Shweta		
2002	Kisme Kitna Hai Dum	Contestant		
2003	Naam Gum Jayegaa	Priyanka Singh		
2003	Kya Hadsaa Kya Haqeeqat	Mayuri / Gauri	Story: "Kab Kyon Kahan"	
2004–2005	Isse Kehte Hai Golmaal Ghar			
2004–2008	Kyunki Saas Bhi Kabhi Bahu Thi	Nandini Thakkar Virani		
2005–2006	Special Squad	Dr. Deepika Ghosh		
2006	Kaisa Ye Pyar Hai	Kanan		
2006	Jodee Kamaal Ki	Contestant		
2006	Nach Baliye 2	Contestant	3rd runner-up	
2008	Left Right Left	Captain Shona Das		
2008	Kabhi Kabhii Pyaar Kabhi Kabhii Yaar	Contestant		
2008	Nach Baliye 4	Host		
2009	Kumkum – Ek Pyara Sa Bandhan	Aditi Kapoor		
2010	Meethi Choori No 1	Contestant		
2014–2015	Meri Aashiqui Tum Se Hi	Faalguni Parekh		
2015	Rishton Ka Mela	Neha		
2017–2018	Tu Aashiqui	Anita Sharma		
2019	Kitchen Champion 5	Contestant		
2023–2024	Pashminna – Dhaage Mohabbat Ke	Preeti Suri		
2025–2026	Kyunki Saas Bhi Kabhi Bahu Thi 2	Nandini Virani		

==== Special appearances ====
Year	Title	Role	Ref.
2005	Jassi Jaissi Koi Nahin	Gauri Pradhan	
2005	Rihaee	Unknown	
2007	Kasamh Se	Anupam Kapadia	
2008	Kya Aap Paanchvi Pass Se Tez Hain?		
2017	Bigg Boss 11	Herself	

=== Web series ===
Year	Title	Role	Notes	Ref.
2024	Tujhpe Main Fida	Tara Rajkishore		
2024	Taaza Khabar	Swati	Season 2	

=== Music video appearances ===
Year	Title	Singer	Ref.
2000	"Chera Subah E Banaras"	Talat Aziz	
2001	"Teri Jhanjhar Kisne Banayi"	Hans Raj Hans	
2001	"Humein Tumse Pyar Hai Kaise Kahe"	Sonu Nigam	

== Awards and nominations ==
Year	Award	Category	Work	Result	Ref.
2002	Indian Telly Award	Best Onscreen Couple (with Hiten Tejwani)	Kutumb	Nominated	
2003	Indian Telly Award	Best Onscreen Couple (with Hiten Tejwani)	Kyunki Saas Bhi Kabhi Bahu Thi	Nominated	
2005	Indian Telly Award	Best Onscreen Couple (with Hiten Tejwani)	Kyunki Saas Bhi Kabhi Bahu Thi	Nominated	
2005	Indian Telly Award	Best Actress in a Supporting Role	Kyunki Saas Bhi Kabhi Bahu Thi	Won	
2018	Gold Awards	Best Actress in a Negative Role	Tu Aashiqui	Nominated	

== See also ==
- List of Indian television actresses
- List of Hindi television actresses
