= Deepak Sharma (director) =

Indian television director and producer

- Born: 22 September 1975 (age 50); New Delhi, India
- Occupations: Director and producer
- Known for: Waapasi (Short film), Kaisa Ye Pyar Hai, Kyunki Saas Bhi Kabhi Bahu Thi, Saathii Re (TV shows)

Deepak Sharma (born 1975) is an Indian television director and producer predominantly working in Hindi Television.

== Early life and career ==
Sharma's career began in 1996 as a theatre worker in Delhi. He is the recipient of the Junior Fellowship for Punjabi Folk Theatre (NAQQAL) from the Ministry of Tourism & Culture, Department of Culture for the year 2002-2004. Later, Sharma started working as an assistant director to Santram Verma. He made his directorial debut with Kaisa Yeh Pyaar hai (2006), an Indian romantic drama series that aired on Sony TV, produced by Balaji Telefilms, starring Iqbal Khan, Neha Bamb, Hiten Tejwani and Jaya Bhattacharya.

This was followed by some of his most commercially successful television shows such as Kumkum, Kyunki... Saas Bhi Kabhi Bahu Thi, Kasam Se, Bhagyavidhata and Na Bole Tum Na Maine Kuch Kaha. He is also the founder of Vertika Films.

In 2013, Sharma ventured into short filmmaking with his Punjabi film Waapasi. The film received the award for 'Best Short Film – Jury Award' and Best Actor Award (Rohit Bhardwaj) at the 3rd Dada Saheb Film Festival 2013. At the Noida International Film Festival 2014, Deepak received the 'Best Director Award'.

Later in the year 2004, Sharma moved to Mumbai and joined Indian Television.

== Television series ==
- Kaisa Ye Pyar Hai - Sony TV
- Kyunki Saas Bhi Kabhi Bahu Thi - Star Plus
- Saathii Re - Star One
- Kasamh Se - Zee TV
- Kasturi - Star Plus
- Kahe Naa Kahe - 9X
- Chhoona Hai Aasmaan - Star One
- Dahhej - 9X
- Kumkum - Star Plus
- Chand Ke Paar Chalo - NDTV Imagine
- Vivaah - Zee TV
- Ranbir Rano - Zee TV
- Bhagyavidhaata - Colors
- Yahaaan Main Ghar Ghar Kheli - Zee TV
- Geeta - Zee TV
- Chhoti Si Zindagi - Zee TV
- Na Bole Tum Na Maine Kuch Kaha - Colors
- Bani – Ishq da Kalma - Colors

=== Short films ===
- Waapasi (Punjabi Language)

== Awards and nominations ==
- 2013 - Best Short Film (Waapasi) – Jury Award at the 3rd Dada Saheb Film Festival 2013
- 2014 - Best Director Award (Waapasi) at the Noida International Film Festival 2014
- 2014 - Best Film Award (Waapasi) at the PGF Film Festival
