= Mano Ya Na Mano =

Mano Ya Na Mano (lit. 'believe it or not') may refer to:

- Mano Ya Na Mano (1995 TV series), an Indian horror television drama-series
- Mano Ya Na Mano (2006 TV series), an Indian reality television program
- Mano Ya Na Mano (film), a 2025 science fiction drama

== See also ==
- Believe It or Not (disambiguation)
