= Rihaee =

Rihaee (lit. 'Release') may refer to these in Indian entertainment:

- Rihaee (1954 film), a 1954 Bollywood film
- Rihaee (film), a 1988 Hindi film directed by Aruna Raje
- Rihaee (TV series) (2005), Indian television crime series that aired on Sony TV
