= Mudasir Zafar =

Indian actor and founder of Organic Motion Picture Industry

- मुदासिर ज़फर
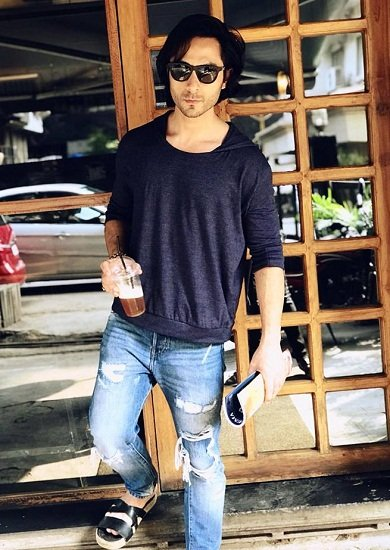
- Zafar promoting his film Nobel peace
- Born: 29 November 1986 (age 39); Jammu
- Occupation: Actor
- Years active: 2012–present
- Height: 173 cm (5 ft 8 in)
- Spouse: Saroosh Zargar
- Parents: Zafar Butt (father); Shabia Zafar (mother)
- Relatives: Madhiya Rizwan (sister)

Mudasir Zafar (Hindi: मुदासिर ज़फर; born 29 November 1986) is an Indian actor. He is an alumnus of Whistling Woods International film school of Subhash Ghai where he learned his acting skills from Naseeruddin Shah, Benjamin Gilani and Rob Recee. He founded the Organic Motion Pictures, a film production house in 2017.

== Early life ==
Zafar was born in Jammu and Kashmir. He got his primary education from Atman School. Later, he studied at the Model Academy in Jammu and then he pursued his B.A. and L.L.B. in Bangalore from KLE Society's Law College. He also played in the Under-19 National Cricket team of Jammu and Kashmir.

== Career ==
Zafar debuted in the film Tension Mat Le Yaar released on 12 April 2012 and later in a love story film titled My Friends Dulhania. The film received mixed reviews from the critics. Zafar also acted in various short films like Meera, Parchayee & Am-Notness along with Rajshri Deshpande for Airtelxstream. He has also worked in some music videos. Zafar appeared in an interview with a film critic Komal Nahta along with the film cast on Zee ETC Bollywood.

In 2020, Zafar starred in a Hindi feature film Nobel Peace along with Hiten Tejwani. In the film he plays a character of Hayan Mir, a small-town man who is trying to find a permanent solution to the religious bitterness. Nobel Peace won the Best Film Jury at the 10th Dada Sahab Phalke Film Festival 2020. Nobel Peace also won the Best Screenplay award at Indian Cine Film Festival Mumbai 2020.

His digital film Epiphany has won the best film award at Little Seal Studios and best editing at My Film Project film challenge. In a recently concluded video interview with the Journalist of Navbharat Times, Zafar was seen talking about the struggle of actors.

Zafar's film The world has En Dead has been making waves on the International film festival circuit, securing prestigious awards and accolades. The gripping narrative has already earned the film top honors at several esteemed film festivals in Toronto, San Diego International Kid's festival California, Boden International film festival, Birsamunda International film festival, Foto film International Istanbul and many more. Zafar's artistic vision aligns with capturing the intricate nuances of a world perpetually in flux. In a realm where creativity intertwines with societal reflections, his journey emerges as a compelling narrative of artistic growth and resonant storytelling.

Zafar's upcoming Hindi feature film Tujhe Chahoon Main shoot begins in Jammu and Kashmir (union territory). The first schedule of the film was filmed in the beautiful landscapes of Bhaderwah for 18 days and the 2nd schedule is to be filmed in Delhi. The Film is targeting a theatrical release in 2025.

== Off-screen work ==
In addition to acting in films, Zafar is a member of the "Mumbai Heroes" along with several actors at the Celebrity Cricket League (CCL), a non-professional men's cricket league in India consisting of film actors from eight regional film industries of the Indian cinema. Zafar made his debut in Celebrity Cricket League for Mumbai Heroes in the year 2023 at Dr. Y. S. Rajasekhara Reddy International Cricket Stadium.

== Personal life ==
Mudasir Zafar tied the knot with Saroosh Zargar, who's not part of the industry. The couple took their vows on 24 July 2022 in a quiet and close-knit ceremony in Kashmir.

== Filmography ==
=== Featured films ===
Year	Film	Role	Director	Language	Notes
2012	Tension Mat Le Yaar	Sahil	Asgar Khan	Hindi	With Om Puri Upasana Singh
2015	Tu Lage Jaan Se Pyara	Rahul	B. Prasad	Hindi	With Milind Gunaji Shakti Kapoor
2017	My Friends Dulhania	Aryan	Prashamit Chaudhury & Op Rai	Hindi	Film music on Zee Music Company
2021	Nobel Peace	Hayan Mir	Astik Dalai	Hindi	With Hiten Tejwani
2023	The World has En Dead	John	Mudasir Zafar	English	Best film at Bollywood International Film Festival and Indian Panorama International Film Festival.
2024	Tujhe Chahoon Main	Aarav Oberoi		Hindi	Filming

=== Short films ===
Year	Film	Role	Director	Language	Notes
2015	Meera	Vijay	Abhinav Babar	Hindi	
2016	Am notness	Sanjay	Abhishek Chandra	Hindi	With Rajshri Deshpande
2016	Parchayee	Akash	Prashamit Chaudhury	Hindi	With Rajshri Deshpande
2021	Epiphany		Mudasir Zafar	Hindi	

=== Music videos ===
Year	Song	Singer	Starring	Director	Language	Notes
2019	"Looser"	Prince KKC	Nishi Yadav	Bandita Bora	Punjabi	Released on 12 September 2019 by Kala Niketan.
2020	"Jag Sara" (Mitti 1)	Farooq Khokhar	Mudasir Zafar		Punjabi	Released on 8 September 2020 by Organic Motion Pictures.
2020	"Mere Liye Tum" (Mitti 2)	Farooq Khokhar	Mudasir Zafar		Punjabi	Released on 8 September 2020 by Organic Motion Pictures.
