= Star India v. Leo Burnett =

2003 Court Case

The Star India v. Leo Burnett case was heard before the Bombay High Court in 2003. The case revolved around using the TV show Kyunki Saas Bhi Kabhi Bahu Thi as a basis for a Tide detergent commercial and whether this violated copyright law.

== Facts of the case ==
Star India was the owner of the copyright in the serial Kyunki Saas Bhi Kabhi Bahu thi's theme and artistic work with which the title appeared on TV according to Clause 6 of the agreement between Star India and Balaji Telefilms. Producers and Marketers of Tide detergent (the defendants) came up with the advertisement for Procter & Gamble showing a scene resembling climax of the TV show and displaying the artistic work appearing on TV with the words "kyunki bahu bhi kabhi saas banegi" Star alleged that people will think that Star licensed or produced the advertisement. Also, Star paid a sum of money to acquire the copyright and Tide was alleged to be trying to encash upon Star's goodwill. Defendants alleged that they independently created the advertisement. Further, it was the idea that was used and ideas are not copyrightable. The commercial was submitted to Star who did not find it objectionable. No average person would make the connect between the show and the ad. Lastly they argued that even if it is a copy, it is not a substantial copy. Star replied saying that it copied the heart of the TV show, i.e. the climax episode.

== Decision of Bombay High Court ==
High Court in this case stated that copy under Section 14 of the Copyright Act meant a physical copy. However, the plaintiffs in this case made a separate work. This was a material alteration as a completely different. The court looked at the similarities and dissimilarities between the show and the ad by comparing the entire show (87hours) with the 30 second advertisement. The work in question was held to be a "cinematographic film" under the Copyright Act. Any prudent person will not confuse between the two. Further, there was no scope for misrepresentation as the ad was aired on channels different from where Kyunki Saas Bhi Kabhi Bahu thi was aired so there was not effect of the ad on the show and the likelihood of damage was too remote.

As far as passing off action is concerned, the court held that there was no common field of activity. Further court held that "state of mind of the public" was necessary to see the goodwill of the characters in the TV soap. There was no material on record to show that people will associate the ad with the show.

== See also ==
- Procter & Gamble Co. v. OHIM
