= Isse Kehte Hai Golmaal Ghar =

- Directed by: Sridhar Rangayan
- Starring: See Below
- Country of origin: India

Production
- Producer: BAG Films
- Running time: Approx. 120 Minutes

Original release
- Network: Sahara One
- Release: 30 October 2004

Isse Kehte Hai Golmaal Ghar (transl. That is called chaos home) is an Indian television Telefilm that aired on Sahara One channel in 2004. The series premiered on 30 October 2004 starring Gauri Pradhan Tejwani, Manav Gohil, Shagufta Ali, Lovleen Mishra, Ashok Lokhande and Ashiesh Roy. Written and Directed by Sridhar Rangayan. Saagar Gupta wrote the Dialogues.

== Cast ==
- Manav Gohil
- Gauri Pradhan Tejwani
- Shagufta Ali
- Ashok Lokhande
- Ashiesh Roy
- Loveleen Mishra
