= Believe It or Not =

Believe It or Not may refer to:

- Believe It or Not (album), a 1979 album by Nutshell
- Believe It or Not (film), a 1983 Soviet comedy film
- "Theme from The Greatest American Hero (Believe It or Not)", a theme song and 1981 single
- Ripley's Believe It or Not!, an American franchise which deals in bizarre events and items
  - Ripley's Believe It or Not! (TV series), various American documentary television series
    - Ripley's Believe It or Not (1949 TV series), 1949-1950
    - Ripley's Believe It or Not! (1982 TV series), 1982-1986
    - Ripley's Believe It or Not! (2000 TV series), 2000-2003
    - Ripley's Believe It or Not! (Philippine TV program), 2008
  - Ripley's Believe It or Not!: The Riddle of Master Lu, a 1995 point-and-click adventure game released for MS-DOS
  - Ripley's Believe It or Not! (pinball), a pinball machine first released in 2004
- "Believe It or Not", a song by Nickelback from the album The Long Road, 2003

== See also ==
- Mano Ya Na Mano (disambiguation)
