= Procter & Gamble Co. v OHIM =

Decision of the European Court of Justice

- European Court of Justice

Decided 20 September 2001
- Full case name: Procter & Gamble Company v Office for Harmonisation in the Internal Market (Trade Marks and Designs)
- Case: C-383/99
- CelexID: 61999CJ0383
- ECLI: ECLI:EU:C:2001:461
- Case type: Appeal against Court of First Instance decision

Court composition
- Advocate General; F.G. Jacobs

Procter & Gamble v. Office for Harmonization in the Internal Market (the 'BABY-DRY' case) is a case before the European Court of Justice about the registration of 'BABY-DRY' as a trademark for baby diapers. OHIM refused the registration of the brand as a community mark saying that 'BABY-DRY' wasn't distinctive, but instead that it was descriptive without a secondary meaning.

The Court ruled that trademarks consisting of certain word combinations not used in a common phraseology may be deemed creations, bestowing distinctive power on the trademark. If the relevant goods or services or their essential characteristics are so formed, then they may be refused registration on the grounds that such marks are solely descriptive and non-distinctive.

== Background ==
Procter & Gamble filed an application to OHIM to re-register 'BABY-DRY' as trademark of baby diapers. The OHIM examiners refused the registration on the terms that 'BABY-DRY' was too descriptive a name.

Procter & Gamble argued that the purpose of diapers is to keep babies dry, therefore this name would be suitable in trademark. OHIM insisted that 'BABY-DRY' was also devoid of distinctive character and thereby could not be registered under Article 7(1)(b) and (c) of Regulation number 40/94. The Court of First Instance confirmed this decision and agreed that 'BABY-DRY' "merely conveyed to consumers the intended purpose of the goods but exhibited no additional feature to render the sign distinctive." In reversing the Court of First Instance, the ECJ first noted that Article 7(1) and Article 12 of Regulation No. 40/94 should be read together and adopted a very narrow interpretation of descriptiveness in evaluating the suitability of registered marks.

Procter & Gamble claimed that marks composed of signs or indications satisfying that definition [of descriptiveness] should not be refused registration unless they lack additional signs and indications, and the purely descriptive signs or indications of which they are composed are not presented or configured in a manner that distinguishes the resultant whole from the usual way of designating the goods or services concerned, or their essential characteristics.

Office for Harmonization in the Internal Market (OHIM) said that descriptiveness must be determined not only in relation to each word taken separately but also in relation to the goods. Any perceptible difference between the combination of words submitted for registration and the terms used in common parlance of the relevant class of consumers to designate the goods or services or their essential characteristics is apt to confer distinctive character on the word combination enabling it to be registered as a trade mark.

== The court‘s decision ==
The ECJ held that while the mark is registered based on a “Syntactical change,” and each of the two words in the combination may form part of expressions used in everyday speech to describe the function of diapers, their juxtaposition is not a familiar English expression with respect to diapers and that the "BABY-DRY" mark was sufficiently distinctive and could be trademark subject matter.

Article 7(1)(c) of Council Regulation (EC) No 40/94 of 20 December 1993 on the Community trademark (OJ 1994 L 11, p. 1) in adopting its decision of 31 July 1998 (Case R 35/1998-1)

Article 7 of Regulation No 40/94 provides as follows: '1- the following shall not be registered: (a) signs which do not conform to the requirements of Article 4; (b) trademarks which are devoid of any distinctive character; (c) trademarks which consist exclusively of signs or indications which may serve, in trade, to designate the kind, quality, quantity, intended purpose, value, geographical origin or the time of production of the goods or of rendering of the service, or other characteristics of the goods or service; 2. Paragraph 1 shall apply notwithstanding that the grounds of non-registrability obtain in only part of the Community. 3. Paragraph 1(b), (c) and (d) shall not apply if the trademark has become distinctive in relation to the goods or services for which registration is requested in consequence of the use which has been made of it.

=== Related case ===
Chiemsee Produktions v. Boots is an ECJ trademark decision, ruling that geographic marks can be registered, as long as the public relates that mark to the trademark owner rather than the geographic area. In some international systems of trademark law, the mark that has a geographic place as a trademark is insufficiently distinctive.

== See also ==
- Star India v Leo Burnett
