= Hasan Zaidi =

Indian television actor (born 1978)

- Born: 28 September 1978 (age 48); Aligarh, Uttar Pradesh, India
- Education: Eastern Mediterranean University, Cyprus
- Occupation: Actor
- Years active: 2003–present
- Notable work: Horror Story Khotey Sikkey; Hum Ne Li Hai... Shapath; Zindagi Mere Ghar Aana
- Spouse: Christina (m. 2009)
- Children: 1

Hasan Zaidi (born 28 September 1978) is an Indian television actor who is known for his roles in Khotey Sikkey and Hum Ne Li Hai... Shapath.

== Life and family ==
Zaidi was born in Aligarh and hails from Hardoi near Lucknow, U.P. He spent a his early childhood in Muscat, Oman. Zaidi was always in the school drama society, which eventually led to his acting career. He was also actively involved in theatre since an early age. He used to perform in plays during his school and college days. Before landing up in Mumbai as an actor, Zaidi finished his bachelor of tourism and hospitality management from Eastern Mediterranean University in Cyprus.

In April 2009, Zaidi married Christina, an Austrian, who works for an NGO in Mumbai. The couple is blessed with a daughter, Naila.

== Career ==
Zaidi made his acting debut in 2003 with Star Plus series Kyun Hota Hai Pyarrr. However, he got his first television breakthrough role as Sachin Chaudhary in the year 2007 with the serial Ghar Ek Sapnaa. Zaidi made his film debut in 2004 with the bollywood film Kyun! Ho Gaya Na....

In 2013, Zaidi debuted in theatre by becoming a part of the popular play Kknock Kknock which had just two characters, Rajesh Khera being the other actor. It gave Zaidi the opportunity to showcase his talent and brought him much acclaim for his acting.

== Filmography ==
=== Television ===
Year(s)	Title	Role	Notes
2003	Kyun Hota Hai Pyarrr		
2003	Naam Gum Jayegaa		
2003	Mera Dil Deewana	Aakhar Chauhan	
2004	Hamse Hai Zamanaa		
2005	Pepsi A.D.A.		
2005–2006	Ek Ladki Anjaani Si	Anuj Shrivastav	
2005–2006	Kahaani Ghar Ghar Kii	Soham Mukherjee	
2006	Kaisa Ye Pyar Hai	Neeraj Sharma	
2006	Remix	Siddharth	
2006	Twinkle Beauty Parlour	Aditya	
2006–2009	Sun Yaar Chill Maar		
2007	Kyunki Saas Bhi Kabhi Bahu Thi	Advocate. Aditya Rai Singhania	
2008	Kumkum – Ek Pyara Sa Bandhan	Ratan Raichand	
2009	Ghar Ek Sapnaa	Sharad Chaudhary	
2009	Sabki Laadli Bebo	Karan Oberoi	
2009	Unwind		A travel show of Sahara Samay Mumbai
2010	Powder		
2010	Rishta.com	Ashish	
2010	Yeh Chanda Kanoon Hai	Kaamdev Sharma / Lucky (Lachu)	Episodic role (3 episodes)
2010	Crime and Bollywood		
2011	Khotey Sikkey	Mohit Kishenchandani	
2012	Hum Ne Li Hai... Shapath	Senior Inspector Gautam	
2013	Gumrah Season 3	Moloy Dasgupta	
2013	Fear Files: Darr Ki Sacchi Tasvirein	Occulist	
2014	Tum Saath Ho Jab Apne	Coach Imran Siddiqui	
2016	Box Cricket League	Himself	Contestant (Chandigarh Cubs Box)
2017	Sher-e-Punjab: Maharaja Ranjit Singh	Hashmat Khan	
2019	Laal Ishq	Mahesh	Episode 134
2019–2020	Beyhadh 2	Aamir Abdullah	
2021–2022	Zindagi Mere Ghar Aana	Pritam Choudhary	
2025	Mannat – Har Khushi Paane Ki	Gagan Raisingh	

=== Films ===
Year(s)	Title	Role	Notes
2004	Kyun! Ho Gaya Na...	Arjun's close friend	Supporting role
2013	Horror Story	Samrat "Sam"	Parallel lead
2014	Dishkiyaoon	Ketan	Supporting role
2017	For Bindiya Call Jugnu	Shakti	Supporting role
2017	Sargoshiyan	Aryan Raina	Lead role
2020	X Zone	Hardick	Supporting role

=== Theatre ===
Year(s)	Title	Role	Notes
2013	Kknock Kknock	Ajay Talwalkar	Lead role (An Indian adaptation of the 1970 play Sleuth by Anthony Shaffer)

=== Web–Series ===
Year(s)	Title	Role	Platform	Notes
2019	Hawa Badle Hassu	GOFCON	Sony Liv	Lead role

=== Short–Films ===
Year(s)	Title	Role	Notes
	The Fourteenth Floor		(A film by Shudeep – A short festival film personifying human emotions)
