= Krishna Cottage =

- Poster
- Directed by: Santram Varma
- Screenplay by: R. M. Joshi, Abhigyan Jha & Nirav Vidya
- Story by: R. M. Joshi, Abhigyan Jha & Nirav Vidya
- Produced by: Ekta Kapoor; Shobha Kapoor
- Starring: Sohail Khan; Isha Koppikar; Natassha; Rati Agnihotri
- Cinematography: Basheer Ali, Sethuraman M
- Edited by: K. Ravi Kumar
- Music by: Anu Malik
- Distributed by: Balaji Films Ltd.
- Release date: 16 April 2004
- Running time: 129 minutes
- Country: India
- Language: Hindi
- Budget: ₹40 million
- Box office: ₹59 million

Krishna Cottage is a 2004 Indian Hindi-language supernatural horror film directed by Santram Varma and produced by the mother-daughter duo of Shobha Kapoor and Ekta Kapoor, better known for producing Indian television soap operas. The film stars Sohail Khan, Isha Koppikar, Natassha and Rati Agnihotri. In the film, the surviving copy of an unfinished book containing nine-and-a-half stories turns out to be cursed, and imperils the lives of a group of college friends.

Upon its release on 16 April 2004, the film received mixed reviews and became a commercial success . Also it gained a Cult status following due to home video and TV runs.

== Plot ==
The film opens at a function celebrating the launch of a book titled Kahi-Ankahi Baatein (Said-Unsaid Things) by Professor Siddharth Das. He donates a copy of the book, which contains nine-and-a-half stories, to JC College. One year later, the college principal quietly removes the book from the library and places it in an abandoned storeroom.

Some time later, a group of close college friends, Manav, his girlfriend Shanti, Kabir, Akshay, Kabir's girlfriend Nupur, and Talli, are shown attending JC College. When Disha, a new student, joins the college, she is invited to Manav and Shanti’s engagement. During the event, Manav saves her just in time, moments before a chandelier crashes down. Later, while the group is driving Disha home, their car collides with an ice wall that vanishes immediately, leaving the car broken down. The group is then forced to spend the night at an old halfway house, Krishna Cottage, where Talli and Disha experience supernatural events. Disha reveals that the spirit of her deceased boyfriend, Amar Khanna, is behind the chaos.

Meanwhile, at the library, Talli learns that Kahi-Ankahi Baatein is Disha’s favourite book. He asks Nupur to read it so that he can use romantic lines from it to impress Disha. Nupur reads the book but is haunted and eventually killed by a mysterious supernatural force. Talli then overhears a conversation between Professor Siddharth Das and the college principal, through which he learns that the book is cursed, so it must be destroyed to prevent further tragedies.

Talli rushes to Nupur’s house to retrieve the book and return it to the library, but cannot find her, as she is already dead. He takes the book and meets Kabir, but accidentally leaves it in Kabir’s car. Kabir reads it out of curiosity and is also killed by the spirit. Manav later confesses to Shanti that while Disha has a strange magnetic pull, he is in love with Shanti alone. This confession enrages Shanti, and she drives off to confront Disha at her home.

There, she meets Disha’s elderly mother, who reveals that Disha has been dead for 22 years.

Realising that both Nupur and Kabir are dead, Shanti faints near a shrine. She is rescued by renowned spiritual medium Sunita Menon, who performs a séance to summon Disha’s spirit. Meanwhile, Talli reads the book and discovers that it centres around Krishna Cottage, but before he can act further, he is killed by Disha.

Professor Das, who was in love with Disha, burns the last few pages of the book and fondly remembers her. However, he dies of a heart attack before Manav and the others can reach him.

Manav discovers Amar Khanna’s corpse preserved in ice, and it is revealed that he himself was Amar in a past life. He and Disha were students at JC College. Disha had confessed her love to him at Krishna Cottage, but he rejected her by saying their bond was more than friendship but less than love. In a fit of obsession, Disha killed some men Amar had earlier fought with and framed him as the prime suspect, hoping they would flee together. Upon learning the truth, Amar tried to escape but crashed the car into a mountain, leading to his death. Disha, refusing to leave his body despite pleas from the principal and the professor, was buried by an avalanche at the site.

Sunita suggests that the only way to stop Disha’s spirit is for Manav and Shanti to get married, as the sanctity of that bond is too strong for any spirit to break. However, their wedding is interrupted by Disha's spirit, who attacks and kills Sunita by impaling her on a tree branch. Manav agrees to go with the spirit but tells Disha that his heart belongs to his wife, Shanti, and he is ready to die for his true love. He jumps to his death but miraculously survives, waking up in a nearby cottage. The caretaker informs him that a woman had dropped him there.

He finds a letter from Disha appearing on the window, in which she finally accepts that his happiness lies with Shanti, and that the true meaning of love is to give, not to possess.

== Cast ==
- Sohail Khan as Manav / Amar Khanna
- Isha Koppikar as Disha
- Anita Hassanandani as Shanti (credited as "Natassha" in film credits)
- Rati Agnihotri as Sunita Menon
- Vrajesh Hirjee as Puneet "Talli" Kumar
- Divya Palat as Nupur
- June Malia as Disha's Friend
- Hiten Tejwani as Akshay Badola
- Alihassan Turabi as Kabir
- Roopa Ganguly as The Nun of the church
- Rajendranath Zutshi as Professor Siddharth Das
- Rajendra Gupta as J.C. College's Principal
- Usha Nadkarni as Disha's mother

== Soundtrack ==
Krishna Cottage

Soundtrack album by Anu Malik Vishal–Shekhar
- Released: 9 February 2004
- Genre: Feature film soundtrack
- Label: Times Music

The film's soundtrack contains seven songs composed by Anu Malik. Lyrics were penned by Sanjay Chhel, Neelesh Mishra, Sameer, and Shekhar Ravjiani. The album was released on 9 February 2004. The music album received a lukewarm response; however, the romantic track "Suna Suna" (Bepanah Pyaar Hai Aaja) has since attained success and become a cult classic.

Title	Singer(s)	Lyrics	Length
"Bindaas"	Shaan, Sunidhi Chauhan	Sanjay Chhel	6:03
"Suna Suna" (Bepanah Pyaar Hai Aaja)	Shreya Ghoshal	Neelesh Mishra	7:24
"Aaju Mein Tum"	Alka Yagnik, Kumar Sanu	Sameer	6:22
"Uff Yun Maa"	Sunidhi Chauhan, Shaan	Sanjay Chhel	7:15
"Hamesha Tere Saath"	Vishal Dadlani	Shekhar Ravjiani	

== Reception ==
Taran Adarsh wrote for Bollywood Hungama, "Krishna Cottage has its moments, but not enough to enjoy an innings like some of the films belonging to this genre". Shilpa Bharatan Iyer of Rediff.com wrote, "All in all a movie worth watching once -- if cheesy spook shows are your thing". Parul Gupta of The Times of India wrote, "Producer Ektaa Kapoor takes the horror film genre literally, making a film that's truly a horror to watch."
