= Nobel Peace (film) =

2020 Indian Hindi-language film

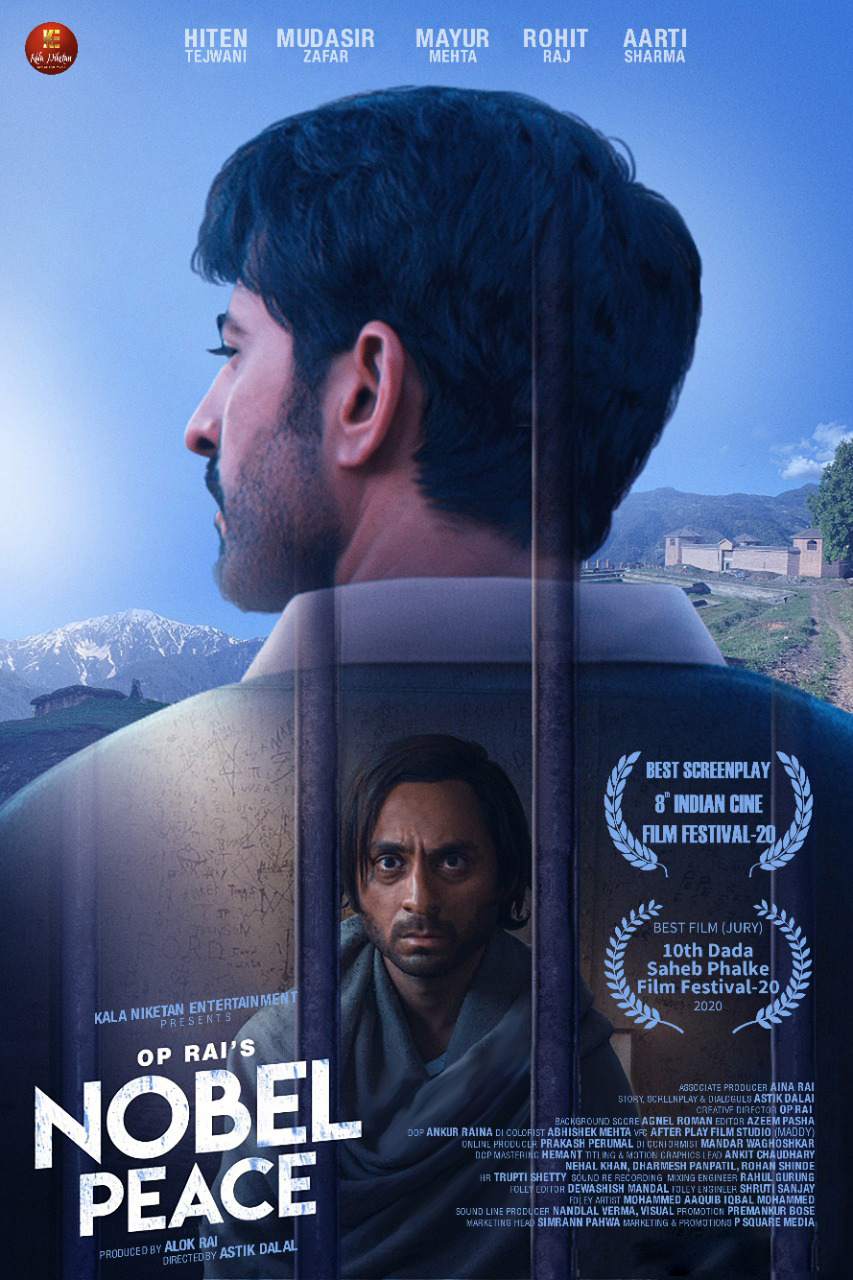
- Film Poster of Nobel Peace
- Directed by: Astik Dalai
- Written by: Astik Dalai
- Produced by: Alok Rai
- Starring: Mudasir Zafar; Hiten Tejwani; Mayur Mehta; Arti Sharma
- Cinematography: Ankur Raina
- Edited by: Azeem Pasha
- Music by: Agnel Roman
- Production company: Kala Niketan Entertainment
- Release date: March 2020 (Dadasaheb Phalke Film Festival)
- Country: India
- Language: Hindi

Nobel Peace is a 2020 Indian Hindi-language feature film directed and written by Astik Dalai and produced by Kala Niketan Entertainment. The film stars Hiten Tejwani, Mudasir Zafar, Mayur Mehta and Aarti Sharma.

== Plot ==
Nobel Peace is about the journey of a young boy Hayan Mir, who finds purpose in life using the power of social media. Under the guidance of a college professor Shlok Manas, Hayan starts an awareness movement with an aim to bring peace in the society plagued by underlying hatred due to biased ethnic sentiments. However, fate has something else in store for him and his mentor.

== Cast ==
- Hiten Tejwani as Professor Shlok Manhas
- Mudasir Zafar as Hayan Mir
- Mayur Mehta as Asif Alam
- Aarti Sharma as Fariha
- Rohit Raj as Lawyer
