= My Friends Dulhania =

2017 film directed by O P Rai

My Friend's Dulhania
- Directed by: O P Rai; Prashamit Chaudhury
- Screenplay by: Mudasir Zafar
- Produced by: Alok Rai
- Starring: Mudasir Zafar; Shaina Baweja; Saurabbh Roy; Mayur Mehta
- Cinematography: Nikhil Dixit; Asad Ali
- Edited by: Rajendra Ghadi
- Music by: Yug Bhusal
- Production company: Kala Niketan Entertainment
- Distributed by: Jaiviratra Entertainment
- Release date: 15 December 2017
- Running time: 87 minutes
- Country: India
- Language: Hindi

My Friend's Dulhania is a 2017 Hindi feature film starring Mudasir Zafar, Shaina Baweja, Saurabbh Roy, Mayur Mehta, Pooja Rathi, Atique Mujawar and Farheen Siddique.

== Plot ==
This movie is the story of a couple, Aryan and Mahira, who got separated because of career and higher studies. Aryan had faith in his love but Mahira left him and cut all her connections with him. This incident breaks his heart. After 2 years he receives a phone call from his college friends, Harsh and Sneha to invite him to the marriage ceremony of their friend Sajad. After reaching the marriage venue, Bhaderwah, state of Jammu and Kashmir, when everyone was insisting Sajad to show the bride's picture, Aryan got speechless as it was the picture of Mahira. Will the two get together again or not?

== Cast ==
- Mudasir Zafar as Aryan
- Shaina Baweja as Maahira
- Mayur Mehta as Harsh
- Saurabbh Roy as Sajjad
- Pooja Rathi as Sneha
- Atique Mujawar as Visphoth khan
- Farheen Siddique as Tamanna
- Harsh soni as Various character
- Aakash sharma as Lover boy
