= Noorjahan (TV series) =

Indian historical television series

- Directed by: Imtiaz Khan
- Starring: Gauri Pradhan; Milind Soman; Kruttika Desai Khan
- Original languages: Hindi; English

Production
- Production company: Cinevistaas Limited

Original release
- Network: DD National
- Release: 2000 – 2001

Noorjahan is an Indian series produced by Cinevistaas, and co written and directed by Imtiaz Khan. It was based on the life of Mughal Queen Noorjahan which aired on Doordarshan in 2000-2001. It was bilingual, shot in English and Hindi.

The title role in the show was played by Gauri Pradhan, while model-turned-actor Milind Soman played Prince Salim with Kruttika Giresh Desai opposite him as his wife Maanbai.

Ghazal artist Talat Aziz and singer Jaspinder Narula sung many ghazals and Love Duets in the show

== Cast ==
- Mangal Dhillon as Emperor Akbar
- Smita Jaykar as Maharani Jodha Bai
- Milind Soman as Prince Salim / Emperor Jahangir
- Gauri Pradhan as Mehrunissa/ Queen Noor Jahan
- Krutika Desai Khan as Maharani Maan Bai
- Puneet Issar as Sher Afghan Khan
- Salil Ankola as Kashmiri poet Yousuf Shah Chak
- Mrinal Kulkarni as Habba Khatoon
- Maya Alagh
- Parikshit Sahni as Mirza Ghiyas Beg
- Ruhshad Nariman Daruwalla as Mehrunissa's elder brother
- Gajendra Chauhan as Todar Mal
- Mahendra Sandhu as Raja Bhagwandas
- Ranjeeta Kaur as Ashmat
- Rahul Bhat as Prince Yakub
