= Naam Gum Jayegaa =

- Genre: Soap opera
- Country of origin: India
- Original language: Hindi

Original release
- Network: Sony TV
- Release: 19 May – 28 August 2003

Naam Gum Jayegaa is a 2003 show that telecast on Sony TV with a total of 60 episodes, and starred Gauri Pradhan, Shilpa Kadam and Kanwaljit Singh.

== Cast ==
- Gauri Pradhan as Priyanka Singh
- Shilpa Kadam
- Kanwaljit Singh
- Hiten Tejwani
- Sachin Shroff
- Hasan Zaidi
