= Saurabbh Roy =

Indian television and film actor (born 1988)

- Born: 2 December 1988 (age 37); Prayagraj, India
- Other name: Saurabbh K Roy
- Occupations: Actor, Model
- Years active: 2008 – Present
- Parent(s): Ashok Kumar Roy; Mamta Roy

Saurabbh Roy (born 2 December 1988) is an Indian television and film actor who acts mainly in Bollywood. He is the finalist of Grasim Mr. India 2006 And winner of the sub title "Best Dressed Male" recently seen in Box Cricket League – Punjab (BCL Punjab) playing for Team "Royal Patialvi". Saurabbh is recognized as the Fear Factor: Khatron Ke Khiladi (season 4) contestant. Where he was partnered with Smita Bansal He played Draupadi`s father, Draupad, in the show Mahabharat (2013 TV series) also seen in a TV show Amita ka Amit.

== Filmography ==
Feature Films
Year	Film	Role	Director	References
2015	Luv Phir Kabhi	Not known	Ajay Yadav	
2017	My Friends Dulhania	Sajad	Op Rai & Prashamit Chaudhury	

Television
Year	Show	Role	References
2011	Khatron ke Khiladi		
2013	Mahabharat (2013 TV series)	Draupad	
2013	Amita ka Amit		
