= Kumkum – Ek Pyara Sa Bandhan =

Indian drama television series

- Genre: Soap opera
- Written by: Mayah Basle; Jayesh Patil; Harsha Jagdish; Radheshyam Rai; Shobhit Jaiswal; Binita Desai; Mahesh Pandey; S Farhan; Barry Dhillon; R M Joshi; Mitesh Shah; Kapil Bavad; Virendra Shahaney; Faizal Akhtar; Anshuman Sinha; Gayatri Gill; Ved Raj; Koel Chaudhuri; Ranu Uniyal
- Directed by: Aashish Patil; Anil V. Kumar; Arvind Babbal; Manchan Vikal; Paresh Patil; Swapnil Mahaling; Sanjay Upadhyay
- Starring: Juhi Parmar; Hussain Kuwajerwala
- Opening theme: "Kumkum" by Sonu Nigam and Pamela Jain
- Composer: Lalit Sen
- Country of origin: India
- Original language: Hindi
- No. of seasons: 1
- No. of episodes: 1449

Production
- Producer: Anuradha Prasad
- Running time: 21 minutes
- Production company: BAG Films

Original release
- Network: Star Plus
- Release: 15 July 2002 – 13 March 2009

Kumkum – Ek Pyara Sa Bandhan (pronounced [ˈkʊmkʊm eːk ˈpjɑːɾɑː sɑː ˈbəndʱən]; transl. A Lovely Bond) is an Indian television series which aired on Star Plus from 15 July 2002 to 13 March 2009. It stars Hussain Kuwajerwala and Juhi Parmar as the lead roles of Sumeet and Kumkum, respectively. It was produced under the company BAG films.

== Plot ==
The soap opera tells the tale of the Wadhwa family and its daughter-in-law, Kumkum. She is happily married to Jatin. However, he dies of a brain tumor while she is expecting their first child. The Wadhwas decide to get their young daughter-in-law remarried and find an eligible young man named Vishal. However, when obstacles arise leading and the marriage is called off on the last day, Jatin's younger brother Sumeet impulsively marries Kumkum in order to save her from societal disgrace. Sumeet is plagued by guilt for marrying Kumkum against her will, but she eventually falls in deep love with him while trying to expose Renuka (Sumeet's ex-girlfriend). The crux of the story evolves as a blossoming romance between Sumeet and Kumkum leads them to realise that they are soulmates and how Kumkum being the ideal daughter-in-law of the Wadhwa family protects Sumeet's family despite the adverse circumstances facing them. Manik (an impostor bearing Jatin's face) creates havoc in their lives, but Kumkum exposes his fake identity and unites with Sumeet. Kumkum gives birth to Sharman and Aashka (Sumeet and Kumkum's progeny).

=== 20 years later ===
Sumeet and Kumkum's story continues with their grown-up kids Dhruv, Sharman and Aashka and Kumkum's role of establishing harmony in the Wadhwa family. Dhruv's wife Antara plans an elaborate ruse to usurp the Wadhwa property and house to herself, but her plans are foiled after Sumeet and Kumkum unveil her truth to Dhruv. Sharman who is in deep love with Neeti gets engaged to her, but when Dhruv refuses to accept Siya on the day of the wedding owing to his feelings for Antara, Sharman impulsively marries Siya. Siya is disappointed and vents her frustration at the Wadhwa family, but she eventually forgives Sharman and confesses her love for him and Sumeet-Kumkum are finally happy to see the Wadhwa family happily settled. Unfortunately both Kumkum and Sumeet die before they complete a ritual that would enable them to be soulmates by Pulkit (Kumkum's ex-stalker) who conspires to kill Sumeet after trailing Kumkum secretly for several days. The shot misses Sumeet, but Kumkum is shot dead and Sumeet punishes Pulkit but still kills himself, unable to bear the separation.

=== 20 years later ===
Sumeet and Kumkum are reborn as prophesied again without any memory of their past life. In the new life Sumeet and Kumkum initially hate each other, but fall in deep love all over again owing to unusual circumstances, prompting them to be a false husband and wife in front of their family members. When they finally realise their love for each other, they are separated due to a misunderstanding between the Raichand and Mishra families and later by a series of new obstacles but eventually reunite in the end. Sumeet marries Kumkum and Harshvardhan and Rajeshwari Wadhwa accompany them to the sacred pilgrimage site where their lives ended in the previous birth. The show ends with memories of the idealistic couple who demonstrated that love finds a way back and is undying and immortal. Sumeet and Kumkum complete the sacred ritual at this place, finally uniting together forever.

== Cast ==
=== Main ===
- Juhi Parmar as
  - Kumkum Rai Wadhwa – Balwant's elder daughter; Simran's sister; Jatin's widow; Sumeet Wadhwa's wife; Dhruv, Sharman and Aashka's mother (2002–2008) (Dead)
  - Chanda – Kumkum Wadhwa's lookalike (2003–2004) (Dead)
  - Kumkum Mishra Raichand – Reborn Kumkum; Bhanumati and Chandumal's daughter; Mini's cousin; Sumeet Raichand's wife (2008–2009)
    - Richa Mukherjee as Child Kumkum Mishra (2008)
- Hussain Kuwajerwala as
  - Sumeet Wadhwa – Kulbhushan and Veena's younger son; Jatin and Preeti's brother; Kumkum Wadhwa's second husband; Sharman and Aashka's father; Dhruv's step-father (2002–2008) (Dead)
  - Sumeet Raichand – Reborn Sumeet; Yashodhara and Omprakash's son; Kumkum Raichand's husband (2008–2009)
    - Varun Shukla as Child Sumeet Raichand (2008)

=== Recurring ===
- Arun Bali as Harshvardhan Wadhwa: Rajeshwari's husband; Brijbhushan, Kulbhushan and Sukanya's father; Rahul, Aarati, Jatin, Sumeet Wadhwa, Preeti, Malini and Nalini's grandfather; Keertan, Pooja, Pamela, Dhruv, Sharman, Aashka's great-grandfather; Om's great great-grandfather (2002–2009)
- Jyotsna Karyekar / Rita Bhaduri as Rajeshwari Wadhwa – Harshvardhan's wife; Brijbhushan, Kulbhushan and Sukanya's mother; Rahul, Aarati, Jatin, Sumeet Wadhwa, Preeti, Malini and Nalini's grandmother; Keertan, Pooja, Pamela, Dhruv, Sharman and Aashka's great-grandmother; Om's great great-grandmother (2002) / (2002–2009)
- Shishir Sharma as Brijbhushan Wadhwa – Harshvardhan and Rajeshwari's elder son; Kulbhushan and Sukanya's brother; Renuka's ex husband; Rahul and Aarti's father; Keertan, Pamela and Pooja's grandfather (2002–2006; 2007)
- Tasneem Sheikh as Renuka Bajaj: Mr. Bajaj's daughter; Brijbhushan's ex wife; Rahul's mother; Keertan's grandmother (2002–2004; 2005) (Dead)
- Prabhat Bhattacharya / Harsh Vashisht as Rahul Wadhwa – Renuka and Brijbhushan's son; Aarti's brother; Naina's husband; Keertan, Pamela and Pooja's father (2002–2003) / (2003–2005; 2007–2008)
- Unknown / Unknown as Tara Verma Wadhwa – Rahul's wife (2003) / (2003)
- Kavita Kaushik as Naina Kulkarni Wadhwa – Sushant's ex wife; Rahul's wife; Keertan, Pamela and Pooja's mother (2004–2005)
- Priya Ahuja as Pamela Wadhwa: Naina and Rahul's daughter; Pooja's sister (2007–2008)
- Unknown as Pooja Wadhwa:: Naina and Rahul's daughter; Pamela's sister (2007–2008)
- Aparna Bhatnagar as Aarti Wadhwa: Renuka and Brijbhushan's daughter; Rahul's sister (2002–2003)
- Paritosh Sand as Kulbhushan Wadhwa – Harshvardhan and Rajeshwari's younger son; Brijbhushan and Sukanya's brother; Veena's husband; Jatin, Sumeet Wadhwa and Preeti's father; Dhruv, Sharman and Aashka's grandfather (2002–2008)
- Prabha Sinha as Veena Wadhwa – Kulbhushan's wife; Jatin, Sumeet Wadhwa and Preeti's mother; Dhruv, Sharman and Aashka's grandmother (2002–2009)
- Anuj Saxena as
  - Jatin Wadhwa – Kulbhushan and Veena's elder son; Sumeet Wadhwa and Preeti's brother; Kumkum Wadhwa's first husband; Dhruv's father (2002)
  - Manik – A goon; Jatin's look alike; Kanta's boyfriend; Mr. Jindal and Kamya's murderer (2005–2006) (Dead)
- Vivan Bhatena / Vishal Watwani as Dhruv Wadhwa – Kumkum Wadhwa and Jatin's son; Sumeet Wadhwa's step-son; Sharman and Aashka's half-brother; Antara's widower (2006–2007) / (2007–2008)
- Sayantani Ghosh / Sonia Singh as Advocate Antara Wadhwa – Dhruv's late wife (2006) / (2006–2008) (Dead)
- Gaurav Khanna / Amit Khanna / Gagan Malik as Sharman Wadhwa – Kumkum Wadhwa and Sumeet Wadhwa's son; Aashka's twin brother; Dhruv's half-brother; Neeti's former love interest; Siya's husband (2006–2007) / (2007) / (2007–2008)
- Karishma Mehta / Nikita Thukral / Snigdha Srivastav as Siya Garewal Wadhwa – Sharman's wife (2006) / (2007) / (2007–2008)
- Chahat Khanna / Niyati Joshi as Aashka Wadhwa Kapoor – Kumkum Wadhwa and Sumeet Wadhwa's daughter; Sharman's twin sister; Dhruv's half-sister; Vikram's wife (2006) / (2006–2007)
- Mihir Mishra as Dr. Vikram Kapoor – Aashka's husband (2006–2007)
- Smita Malhotra as Preeti Wadhwa Khanna – Kulbhushan and Veena's daughter; Jatin and Sumeet Wadhwa's sister; Ashutosh's wife (2002–2005)
- Unknown / Bhuvan Chopra / Kuldeep Dubey as Dr. Ashutosh Khanna – Preeti's husband (2002) / (2003) / (2005)
- Alka Kaushal as Sukanya Wadhwa Malhotra – Rajeshwari and Harshwardhan's daughter; Hemant's wife; Malini and Nalini's mother (2002–2008)
- Iqlaq Khan as Hemant Malhotra – Sukanya's husband; Malini and Nalini's father (2002)
- Unknown / Natasha Singh / Malini Kapoor as Malini "Malli" Malhotra Kashyap – Sukanya and Hemant's daughter; Nalini's sister; Inder's wife (2002–2003) / (2003) / (2003–2004) / (2004–2006)
- Unknown / Tarana Raja as Nalini "Nalli" Malhotra – Sukanya and Hemant's daughter; Malini's sister (2002–2003) / (2005) (Dead)
- Pankit Thakker as Krishnakant "Krish" Wadhwa – Sumeet Wadhwa's cousin (2005–2006)
- Yusuf Hussain / Jitendra Trehan as Balwant Rai – Kumkum Wadhwa and Simran's father; Dhruv, Sharman and Ashika's grandfather (2002) / (2002–2003)
- Kuljeet Randhawa / Eva Grover as Simran "Simi" Rai – Balwant's younger daughter; Kumkum Wadhwa's sister (2002) / (2002–2003)
- Mohini Sharma as Omprakash Raichand and Komal's mother; Sumeet Raichand's grandmother (2008)
- Indraneel Bhattacharya as Omprakash Raichand – Komal's brother; Yashodhara's husband; Sumeet Raichand's father (2008–2009)
- Utkarsha Naik as Yashodhara Raichand – Omprakash's wife; Sumeet Raichand's mother (2008–2009)
- Seema Pandey / Shivani Gosain as Komal Raichand – Omprakash's sister (2008) / (2008–2009)
- Pragati Mehra as Ramola Raichand – Ratan's mother (2008)
- Hasan Zaidi as Ratan Raichand – Ramola's son; Sumeet Raichand's cousin (2008)
- Surendra Pal as Chandumal Mishra – Shatru's brother; Bhanumati's husband; Kumkum Mishra's father (2008–2009)
- Pratichi Mishra as
  - Mrs. Khanna (2002)
  - Bhanumati "Manno" Mishra: Chandumal's wife; Kumkum Raichand's mother (2008–2009)
- Aashish Kaul as Shatru Mishra – Chandumal's brother; Dilasa's husband; Mini's father (2008)
- Avantika Salian as Dilasa Mishra – Shatru's wife; Mini's mother (2008)
- Aditi Shirwaikar as Mini Mishra – Dilasa and Shatru's daughter; Kumkum Mishra's cousin; Gaurav's wife (2008–2009)
- Rajeev Kumar as Raj (2002)
- Imran Khan as
  - Professor Naren (2002)
  - Rajeev Oberoi (2007–2008) (Dead)
- Vikram Sahu as Dr. Shah (2002; 2005)
- Pramatesh Mehta as College Vice Chancellor (2002)
- Mahru Sheikh as Rukmini Malhotra – Vikram's wife; Vishal's mother (2002–2003)
- Mehul Buch as Vikram Malhotra – Vishal's father (2003)
- Abhimanyu Singh / Raman Trikha as Vishal Malhotra – Rukmini and Vikram's son (2002) / (2002–2003)
- Buddhaditya Mohanty as Akshay Saluja (2003)
- Pratap Sachdev as Mr. Verma (2003)
- Sanjay Swaraj / Hemant Choudhary as Inspector Bhupendra Singh (2003) / (2003–2004; 2006–2007)
- Meenakshi Verma as Mrs. Chauhan – Abhay and Abha's mother (2004)
- Aman Verma as Abhay Chauhan: Abha's elder brother; Chanda's boyfriend; Asit's murderer (2004–2005)
- Surbhi Tiwari as Abha Chauhan – Abhay's sister (2005)
- Kunal Kumar / Vijay Bhatia / Unknown as Uday – Abhay's assistant (2004) / (2004) / (2005)
- Meghna Malik as Sushma Patel – Akash's widow; Salil and Sanket's mother (2005)
- Kabir Sadanand as Salil Patel: Akash and Sushma's elder son; Sanket's elder brother; Nalini's murderer; Renuka's one sided obsessive lover (2005) (Dead)
- Kapil Soni as Sanket Patel – Sushma and Akash's younger son; Salil's brother (2005)
- Sameer Soni as Advocate Yash Thakur – Gauri's father (2005)
- Unknown as Gauri Thakur – Yash's daughter (2005)
- Megha Gupta / Ira Soni as Neeti Damani – Sharman's former love interest (2006–2007) / (2007–2008)
- Mukul Dev as Pulkit – Kajal's adoptive father (2008) (Dead)
- Soni Singh as Kajal – Pulkit's adopted daughter (2008)
- Shweta Kawatra as Nivedita Mittal – Kumkum Wadhwa's friend (2007)
- Radhakrishna Dutta as Mr. Bajaj – Renuka's father (2002–2003)
- Akhil Mishra as Vrinda's uncle (2004)
- Puneet Vashisht as Veerendra "Veeru" Sachdev (2003–2004)
- Rajesh Kumar as Sushant – Naina's ex-husband (2004)
- Ami Trivedi as Vrinda (2004–2005)
- Abir Goswami as Asit Sengupta (2004; 2005) (Dead)
- Gautam Chaturvedi as Akash Patel – Sushma's husband; Salil and Sanket's father (2005) (Dead)
- Rushad Rana as Dr. Rohit Kapoor (2005)
- Shagufta Ali as Gul (2005)
- Dimple Inamdar as Kamya Verma (2006) (Dead)
- Anang Desai as Advocate Ashwin Vanjara (2006)
- Nimai Bali as Inspector Satyadev Tipley (2007)
- Phalguni Parekh as Susheela – Neeti's Aunt (2006–2007)
- Rohit Bakshi as Sanjay (2007)
- Sonia Kapoor as Inspector Revati (2007–2008)
- Akshita Garud as Child Roshni Mehra (2003–2005)
- Hemant Thatte as Ashwin (2008)
- Faisal Raza Khan as Sarjan Singh (2008–2009)
- Ajay Chaudhary as Ustad (2008–2009)
- Gauri Pradhan as Aditi Kapoor (2009)
- Rajesh Khattar as Kishan Katara (2007)
- Hiten Tejwani as Ranveer Singh (2009)
- Jayant Rawal as Basheshwar Kapoor (2009)
- Prithvi Zutshi as Pakiya (2005–2006)
- Roma Bali as Preeto Kapoor (2009)
- Sai Ballal as Mr. Mittal – Nivedita's father (2007)
- Nupur Joshi as Mishri – Mahesh's wife (2007)
- Sachin Verma as Mahesh – Mishri's husband (2007)
- Vineeta Malik as Dulari – Mahesh's grandmother (2007)
- Jaya Bhattacharya as Devyani (2008)
- Simple Kaul as Dr. Chanchal (2008)
- Gurmeet Choudhary as Ballu (2004)
- Iqbal Azad / Siraj Mustafa Khan as Aditya Garewal (2006–2007) / (2007)
- Dinesh Kaushik as Mr. Acharya (2007)
- Manasvi Vyas as Sudha Acharya (2007)
- Manasi Jain as Chutki Acharya (2007)
- Purbi Joshi as Amandeep (2007)
- Yash Mittal as Child Nimbuda (2007)
- Sanjeet Bedi as Mohit – Neeti's ex-fiancé (2006–2007)
- Ajit Mehra as Dr. Karan Roy (2002; 2005)
- Raja Kapse as Ashok Mehta / Doctor / Dr. Sinha / Mr. Gupta / Kumkum Wadhwa's fake father
- Neha Bam as Doctor (2003)
- Nilofer Khan as Madhu Rastogi – Rahul's girlfriend (2003)
- Bharat Arora as Rajat Talukdar (2003)
- Vishal Saini as Teju (2004)
- Monaz Mevawala as Pinky Rai (2004)
- Ahmed Khan as Dhanpat Rai (2004)
- Aadesh Chaudhary as Avinash (2008–2009)
- Manini Mishra as Anita (2004)
- Raj Arjun as Jagannath (2004)
- Dinesh Thakkar as Manohar Shah (2004–2005)
- Sunil Nagar as Mr. Garewal – Siya's father (2004)
- Bhumika Seth as Chandni (2004)
- Sulabha Deshpande / Usha Nadkarni as Viju (2004) / (2004)
- Ali Khan as Madan (2008–2009)
- Nasir Sheikh as Inspector Sharma (2002)
- Deepak Advani as Advocate Goel (2006)
- Sanatan Modi as Advocate (2003)
- Kuldeep Sareen as Murad Khan (2004)
- Imran Hasnee as Naina's Boss (2004)
- Badrul Islam as Chamanlal (2009)

== Production ==
After 780 episodes, on 10 April 2006, the storyline of the series took a leap of 20 years. Then it took another leap of 20 years in 2008 where the leads were shown reincarnated with a new family.

In February 2009, the channel informed the production house to terminate the series by 13 March 2009. As per the channel's instructions the series ended on that day.

== Reception ==
It received the highest ratings in the afternoon slot and is regarded as one of the longest ran Indian soap during afternoons.

After a time change from 3:30 pm to 1:00pm (IST) in November 2002, it started receiving ratings ranging 6 to 7 TVR in March 2003, becoming the most viewed afternoon show, overcoming the other highest rated afternoon shows like Bhabhi and Shagun. On 25 March 2004, it received the highest ever afternoon rating of 13.12 TVR, overtaking some prime time soaps.

== Accolades ==
- Indian Telly Awards 2005: Best Actor critic (Female) – Juhi Parmar - Won
- Indian Telly Awards 2007: Style Icon of the Year:Hussain Kuwajerwala - Won
- Indian Telly Awards 2007: Best Actor in a Leading Role (Male)-Hussain Kuwajerwala- Nominated
