= Mano Ya Na Mano (film) =

Indian Drama film

- Directed by: Yogesh Pagare
- Written by: Yogesh Pagare
- Produced by: Vijay M. Jain
- Starring: Hiten Tejwani; Rajiv Thakur; Shikhaa Malhotra; Nihar Thakkar
- Cinematography: Jai Kamal Suthar
- Edited by: Gyanendra Singh
- Music by: Siddharth Saha
- Production companies: Sci Fi Indian Films and Falling Sky Entertainment
- Release date: 2025
- Country: India
- Language: Hindi

Mano Ya Na Mano – Anything Is Possible is Hindi science fiction drama film written and directed by Yogesh Pagare, starring Hiten Tejwani, Rajiv Thakur, Shikhaa Malhotra, Nihar Thakkar, Pournima Navani, Hansi Shrivastava and Sanjeev Shubha Srikar. The film is an remake of the 2007 American film The Man from Earth.

== Production ==
The film is produced by Vijay M. Jain under the banner of SCI FI Indian Films in association with Falling Sky Entertainment, with Richard Schenkman and Eric D. Wilkinson as co-producers. The executive producers are Emerson Bixby and Ravi Khengle. The original story is written by Jerome Bixby, while the Hindi screenplay and dialogues have been adapted by Yogesh Pagare.

Mano Ya Na Mano – Anything Is Possible was shot in Mumbai.

== Cast ==
- Hiten Tejwani as Manav
- Rajiv Thakur as Vansh
- Shikhaa Malhotra as Meghna
- Nihar Thakkar as Ajay
- Pournima Navani as Geeta
- Hansi Shrivastava as Divya
- Sanjeev Shuba Srikar as Jimmy

== Plot ==
Manav Kumar is a history professor. On the night of his farewell party, he shocks his friends with an unusual confession — he says he stopped aging after the age of 40 and has been alive on Earth for more than 14,000 years. Some friends laugh it off as a joke, while others are left confused and amazed.
