= Talat Aziz =

Musical artist (b. 1956)

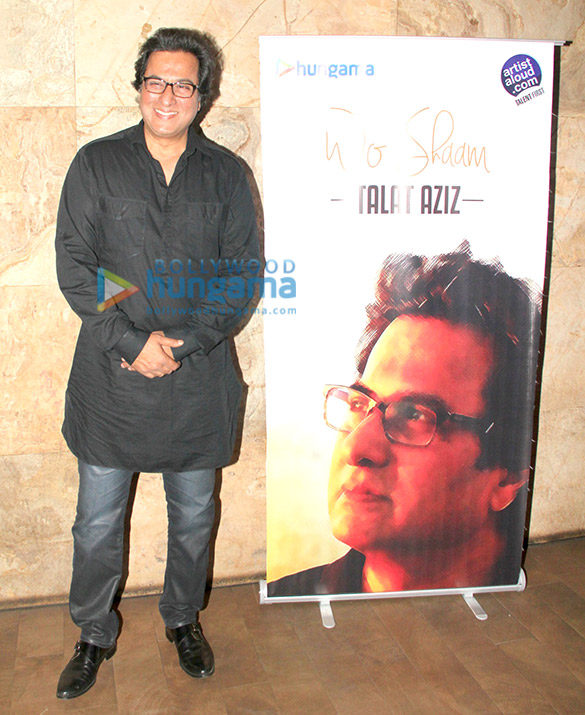
- Talat Aziz in 2017

Background information
- Born: Talat Abdul Aziz; 11 November 1956 (age 69); Hyderabad, Telangana, India
- Genres: Ghazal, playback singing, actor
- Occupations: Singer, composer
- Instrument: Harmonium
- Years active: 1979–present

Talat Abdul Aziz (born 11 November 1956) is an Indian ghazal singer and actor.

== Early life ==
Talat Abdul Aziz was born in Hyderabad, India to Abdul Azeem Khan and Sajida Abid, a famous Urdu writer and poet. He attended Hyderabad Public School, Begumpet.

His family organized Mehfils, inviting artists and poets such as Jagjit Singh and Jan Nisar Akhtar. This greatly influenced him to learn music from an early age.

== Personal life ==
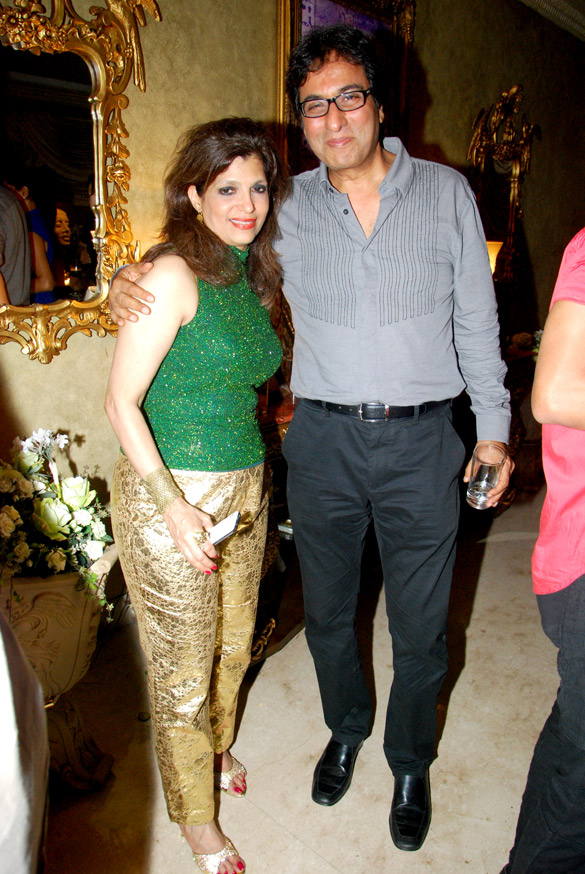
Bina and Talat Aziz in 2012

Aziz is married to Bina Aziz, a painter and art curator. They have two sons, Adnan Aziz and Shayaan Aziz.

== Musical career ==
Aziz took his initial training in music from Kirana Gharana. He was trained primarily by Ustad Samad Khan and later by Ustad Faiyyaz Ahmed Khan.

After his initial training, Aziz learnt music from the Ghazal singer Mehdi Hassan. He appeared with him in many concerts in India and worldwide.

He released his first album in 1980, under Jagjit Singh titled Jagjit Singh presents Talat Aziz. In 1981, he sang in the film Umrao Jaan.

He has sung many songs for composers Laxmikant–Pyarelal and Rajesh Roshan.

Aziz has also composed music for various TV serials. He composed music for serials such as Deewar, Baaz, Adhikaar, Ghutan, Sailaab, Aashirwad and Noorjahan. He composed music and sung for a feature film titled Majaz: Ae Gham-e-Dil Kya Karun. This film was produced by Shakeel Akhtar and was a biography on the poet Majaz. He has released many albums and has collaborated with singers such as Sonu Nigam, Lata Mangeshkar, Asha Bhosle, Ghulam Ali, Hariharan and Pankaj Udhas.

== Award ==
- Lokmat Sur Jyotsna National Music Award - 2025 Icon Award for him contribution to Indian music

=== Acting ===
Besides composing music for various TV serials, he also acted in them. Aziz was supposed to play the lead role in the film Dhun, directed by Mahesh Bhatt, however the film got shelved. In 2015, he appeared in the film Fitoor where he played a brief role. In 2023, he appeared in the family-drama Gulmohar and the following year he starred in the film Fighter.

== Discography ==
- Jagjit Singh Presents Talat Aziz
- Talat Aziz Live
- Best of Talat Aziz
- Images
- A Dream Come True
- Lehren
- Ehsaas
- Suroor
- Saughaat
- Tasavvur
- Manzli
- Dhadkan
- Shahkaar
- Mehboob
- Irshaad
- Khubsoorat
- Khushnuma
- Silver Anniversary Concert
- Caravan E Ghazal
- A Tribute to the Master Medhi Hasan
- Parchaaiyan Volume 1 and 2
- Hardil Aziz
- Betaabiyaan
- Jazbaat
- The Ghazal Maestro
- Wo Shaam

== Popular film songs ==
Song	Movie	Year
Zindagi Jab Bhi Teri Bazm Mein	Umrao Jaan	1981
Phir Chhidi Raat Baat Phoolon Ki	Bazaar	1982
Tumhin Se Roshan Hai Raat Meri	Lorie	1982
Aaina Mujhse Meri	Daddy	1989
Yaad Aane Wale Kyun	Dhun	1991
Main Aatma Tu Parmaatma	Dhun	1991
Lagi Prem Dhun Laagi	Dhun	1991
Na Kisi Ki Aankh Ka	Shararat	2002
Saaz e Dil Naghmae Jaan	Yatra	2006

== Television ==
=== As actor ===
- Sailaab
- Sahil
- Junoon
- Ghutan (1997-1998)
- Dil Apna Aur Preet Parayee
- Noorjahan (2000-2001)
- Modern Love: Mumbai Episode 2 - Baai (2022)
- Scam 2003

== Filmography ==
- Chand Sa Roshan Chehra (2005)
- Fitoor (2016)
- Gulmohar (2023)
- Fighter (2024) as Mr. Pathania
- Khel Khel Mein (2024)

=== As contestant ===
- Jhalak Dikhhla Jaa 5 (2012), Eliminated
