= Kyunki Saas Bhi Kabhi Bahu Thi =

Indian drama television series

- Genre: Soap opera Melodrama; Romance; Family
- Created by: Ekta Kapoor
- Written by: Anil Nagpal; Rajesh Joshi; Anand Gandhi; Vipul Mehta
- Screenplay by: Anil Nagpal
- Story by: Anil Nagpal
- Directed by: Santosh Bhatt; Nivedita Basu; Santram Varma; Avhiroop Mazzumdar; Deepak Sharma
- Creative director: Nivedita Basu
- Starring: See below
- Opening theme: Kyunki Saas Bhi Kabhi Bahu Thi by Priya Bhattacharya
- Country of origin: India
- Original language: Hindi
- No. of episodes: 1,833

Production
- Producers: Ekta Kapoor; Shobha Kapoor
- Cinematography: Raju Halasagi; Sudesh Kotian; Deepak Malwankar; Sanjay Malwankar; Ashok Salian; Sanjay Memane
- Editors: Dharmesh Shah; Sanjeev Shukla; Sagar S Naighojkar
- Camera setup: Multi-camera
- Running time: 22 minutes
- Production company: Balaji Telefilms

Original release
- Network: Star Plus
- Release: 3 July 2000 – 6 November 2008

Related
- Kyunki Saas Bhi Kabhi Bahu Thi 2

Kyunki Saas Bhi Kabhi Bahu Thi (transl. Because Even a Mother-in-Law Was a Daughter-in-Law Once) is an Indian Hindi-language television series that aired from 3 July 2000 to 6 November 2008 on Star Plus. One of the longest running Indian television soap opera, the show is produced by Shobha Kapoor and Ekta Kapoor under their banner Balaji Telefilms.

The show revolves around an ideal daughter-in-law, the daughter of a pandit married to Mihir, grandson of business tycoon Govardhan Virani. The role of Tulsi Virani was played by Smriti Irani, who holds the record for winning 5 consecutive Best Actress-Popular awards from Indian Television Academy Awards and 2 Indian Telly Awards. Debuting alongside Kaun Banega Crorepati on July 3, 2000, on Star Plus, Kyunki... was the most successful serial at its time, ranked number 1 with double digit TRPs for seven continuous years, peaking at 22.4 in May 2001. Kyunki... marked a turning point for producer Ekta Kapoor and Star Plus and resulted in iconic serials Kahaani Ghar Ghar Kii and Kasautii Zindagii Kay (2001 TV series), forming the big 3 for the channel through the 2000s. The show won 5 consecutive Best Serial-Popular awards from ITA and 6 consecutive Best Continuing Serials from Indian Telly Awards.

== Plot ==
Set in Mumbai, the series follows the wealthy Gujarati Virani family of Shantiniketan, dominated by the three daughters-in-laws Savita, Daksha and Gayatri, and their wise mother-in-law Amba, known as Baa. Savita arranges her son, Mihir's marriage to Payal, but he falls in love with her childhood friend Tulsi, the kind-hearted daughter of the family priest, and marries her instead. Savita initially despises Tulsi, but Tulsi eventually wins her acceptance and becomes the family's moral centre. After giving birth to Gautam, Tulsi loses Mihir in an accident in which he is presumed dead.

Mihir survives with amnesia and is cared for by Dr Mandira, who falls in love with him. Mandira's brother, Anupam proposes to Tulsi, who accepts for Gautam's sake, but the wedding is canceled when Mihir is discovered alive and gradually regains his memory. Mandira plots against Tulsi and is presumed dead in a plane crash, while Payal's revenge against the Viranis is also exposed. Tulsi later has a daughter, Shobha, and gives Gautam to childless Kiran and Aarti, who leave India with him fearing Tulsi will reclaim him. Bapuji sadly dies in his sleep leaving Baa and the family in grief.

==== 20 years later ====
Tulsi and Mihir have another son, Harsh. Gautam eventually returns to India, learns that Tulsi and Mihir are his birth parents, and accepts them. Gautam marries Ganga, later they get divorced, but he marries Teesha. Hemant and Pooja's son, Sahil marries Ganga to protect her honour, while Shobha marries Payal's son, Vishal. Payal reveals that she seeks revenge from Tulsi. Tulsi then discovers that Mihir has secretly been involved with Mandira for years and has an illegitimate son, Karan. Mandira and Karan attempt to take over the Virani industries but fail. Teesha and her unborn child die in an accident planned by Mandira for Tulsi. Tulsi accepts Karan as her son after he learns the truth and turns against Mandira.

Harsh marries the greedy Mohini, while Gautam marries Damini. Damini and Ganga become pregnant, but Ganga miscarries and Damini gives birth to twins Mayank and Nakul. Damini and Gautam give Nakul to Sahil and Ganga. Vishal dies, leaving Shobha widowed later married to Abhishek. It is then revealed that Harsh is actually Kesar's son: Kesar had switched him with Tulsi's real son Ansh, who was raised by Aditya Gujral. Ansh grows into a ruthless man obsessed with Karan's lover Nandini. Karan, despite loving Nandini, marries her to Ansh, who sexually abuses her. When Nandini's daughter, Bhoomi is born, Nandini falls into a coma. Karan marries his friend Tanya to help care for Bhoomi.

Tulsi fights Ansh in court to obtain justice for Nandini and ultimately shoots him dead when he tries to kill Nandini. Nandini later awakens, while Karan and Tanya continue raising Bhoomi. Shobha leaves Abhishek after learning that he and Rathi were responsible for Vishal's death. Nandini, pregnant with Karan's child, kills Aditya to save Bhoomi from being kidnapped and is sentenced to 14 years in prison. Ganga and Sahil have a son, Lakshya; Karan and Tanya have a son, Manthan; and Gautam adopts Eklavya, Ansh's son by his first wife Shraddha. Sahil subsequently has an affair with Tripti.

Meanwhile, Meera falls in love with Mihir and conspires with Mandira against Tulsi. Savita discovers their plans but is left paralyzed after an accident arranged by the two women. Savita asks Tulsi to disconnect her life support to end her suffering, and Tulsi does so. Meera convinces Mihir that Tulsi deliberately killed Savita. Mihir expels Tulsi from Shantiniketan, and she is later presumed dead in a bus accident. Devastated and blaming himself, Mihir becomes an alcoholic. Ganga leaves Sahil after discovering his affair with Tripti. Tulsi travels to Haridwar, where she rescues a newborn girl abandoned by her father and names her Krishna Tulsi.

==== 20 years later ====
Tulsi, who lives in Haridwar has become old and lives with Krishna Tulsi. The grown-up Krishna Tulsi comes to Mumbai for her education and stays with the Viranis. Tulsi eventually reunites with the family, while Mihir exposes Meera and she is imprisoned for Savita's murder. Mihir and Tulsi remarry.

Tanya eventually divorces Karan after accepting that he still loves Nandini. Karan and Nandini remarry and try unsuccessfully to find their lost son, who had been taken by Mandira after his birth. Sahil divorces Tripti and reunites with Ganga, who has become a successful businesswoman. Krishna Tulsi and Lakshya fall in love, while Mayank is arrested for attempting to molest Krishna. Krishna is forced to marry Eklavya, who resembles his father Ansh and mistreats her. Bhoomi, who loves Abir, marries Joydeep because of family turmoil, while Abir marries Mohini's daughter, Archita; the sisters eventually accept their respective marriages.

Damini joins Tripti and Tanya in seeking revenge for Mayank's arrest. They manipulate circumstances to make Tulsi appear mentally unstable, resulting in her being sent to a mental hospital. After escaping, Tulsi has an accident. Juhi Thakral then claims to be Tulsi, saying she underwent plastic surgery, and works with Mandira. Juhi is eventually exposed, while the real Tulsi, who had temporarily lost her memory, returns and regains her place in the family. Lakshya unknowingly marries Tripti's adopted daughter, Vaidehi, who initially creates conflict but later reforms. Tulsi defeats enemies including Tripti, Mandira, Juhi and Shiv, Ganga's obsessive lover, while Damini eventually changes her ways. The Viranis reunite after their prolonged separation. Baa later dies, leaving her entire inheritance to an unknown person in her will.

==== 5 years later ====
Mihir and Tulsi live with an orphaned girl, Sugandhi, while Mihir develops Alzheimer's disease. After learning that Baa left them nothing, the Virani children leave Shantiniketan. In the final episode, Tulsi's best friend Parvati Agarwal reunites with her and reveals that she has raised Baa's chosen inheritor, Parth—the long-lost son of Karan and Nandini. The series ends on a cliffhanger.

== Cast ==
The cast of first four generations of Virani family in Kyunki Saas Bhi Kabhi Bahu Thi.

=== Main ===
- Dinesh Thakur / Sudhir Dalvi as Govardhan Virani: Amba's husband (2000) / (2000-2002; 2008)
- Sudha Shivpuri as Amba Virani: Govardhan's widow; Mihir, Kiran, Chirag, Suhasi, Hemant and Sejal's grandmother (2000-2008)
- Shakti Singh as Mansukh Virani – Govardhan and Amba's eldest son; Mihir and Kiran's father (2000-2004)
- Apara Mehta as Savita Virani – Mansukh's widow; Mihir and Kiran's mother (2000-2006)
- Amar Upadhyay / Inder Kumar / Ronit Roy as Mihir Virani: Savita and Mansukh's son; Tulsi's husband (2000-2002) / (2002) / (2002-2008)
- Smriti Irani as Tulsi Virani: Virani priest's daughter; Mihir's wife (2000-2007; 2008)
- Mandira Bedi / Achint Kaur as Dr. Mandira Gujral / Priyanka Dutta: Anupam's sister; Karan's mother (2001-2003) / (2003–2008)
- Jaya Bhattacharya as Payal Mehra – Mihir and Hemant's ex-fiancée; Vishal and Urvashi's mother (2000-2007)
- Sumeet Sachdev as Gautam "Gomzy" Virani – Tulsi and Mihir's eldest son; Tisha's widower; Damini's husband (2002-2008)
- Ashlesha Sawant as Teesha Mehta Virani – Gautam's second wife (2002–2003)
- Riva Bubber / Ravee Gupta as Damini Khanna Virani – Gautam's third wife (2003; 2004–2008) / (2003–2004)
- Rahul Lohani as Mayank Virani – Gautam and Damini's elder son (2006–2007)
- Naman Shaw as Nakul Virani – Gautam and Damini's younger son (2006–2008)
- Kratika Sengar / Anita Hassanandani as Sanchi Virani – Nakul's love interest (2007) / (2007–2008)
- Ritu Chaudhary as Shobha Virani Choudhary – Tulsi and Mihir's daughter; Vishal's widow; Pushkar and Pari's mother (2002–2008)
  - Palak Jain as Child Shobha Virani (2003)
- Rohit Bakshi as Vishal Mehra – Payal and Pratap's son, Shobha's first husband; Pushkar's father (2002–2004)
- Vivan Bhatena / Nasir Khan as Abhishek Choudhary – Shobha's ex-husband; Pari's father (2004–2005) / (2005–2006)
- Garima Bhatnagar as Pari Choudhary – Shobha and Abhishek's daughter (2005–2006)
- Hiten Tejwani as Karan Virani – Mihir and Mandira's son; Nandini's second husband (2002–2008)
- Gauri Pradhan as Nandini Thakkar Virani – Ansh's ex-wife; Karan's wife (2004–2008)
- Rakshanda Khan as Tanya Malhotra – Kaushalya's daughter, Karan's second wife (2004–2008)
- Amit Tandon / Vishal Watwani as Manthan Virani – Karan and Tanya's son (2006–2007) (2007–2008) / (2007)
- Akashdeep Saigal as
  - Ansh Gujral aka Ansh Virani – Tulsi and Mihir's younger son; Nandini's ex-husband; Shraddha's late husband (2004–2005)
  - Eklavya Gujral Virani – Shraddha and Ansh's son; Krishna Tulsi's husband (2006–2008)
    - Amey Pandya as Young Eklavya Gujral Virani (2006)
- Mouni Roy as Krishna Tulsi "KT" Virani – Tulsi's namesake daughter; Eklavya's wife (2006–2008)
- Reshmi Ghosh as Bhoomi Gujral Virani – Nandini and Ansh's daughter; Joydeep's wife (2006–2008)
  - Chinky Jaiswal as Child Bhoomi Virani (2005-2006)
- Manav Vij as Joydeep Virani – Sahil & Tripti's adopted son; Bhoomi's husband (2007–2008)
- Aman Verma as Anupam Kapadia – Mandira's brother; Kesar's husband (2001–2004)
- Narayani Shastri / Resham Tipnis as Kesar Kapadia – Tulsi's cousin; Raj's former lover; Harsh's mother; Anupam's wife (2001–2003) / (2003–2004)
- Mehul Kajaria as Harsh Virani / Harsh Bhasin – Kesar and Raj's son; Mohini's husband (2002–2006)
- Tassnim Sheikh as Mohini Mittal Virani – Harsh's wife; Archita's mother (2004–2008)
- Gunjan Vijaya as Archita Virani Bhasin – Harsh and Mohini's daughter; Abir's wife (2006–2008)
- Manoj Bidwai / Vikas Sethi as Abir Bhasin – Raj's son; Harsh's half-brother; Archita's husband (2006–2007) / (2007)
- Jiten Lalwani as Kiran Virani – Mansukh and Savita's younger son; Aarti and Mandira's ex-husband (2000–2004)
- Eva Grover / Rushali Arora as Aarti Patel Virani – Kiran's ex-wife; Karishma's mother (2000–2002) / (2002–2003)
- Kiran Dubey as Karishma Virani Dey – Aarti and Kiran's daughter; Shantanu's wife. (2002–2004)
- Narendra Jha as Shantanu Dey – Karishma's husband (2004)
- Jitendra Trehan as Himmat Virani – Govardhan and Amba's second son; Daksha's husband (2000–2008)
- Ketki Dave as Daksha Virani – Himmat's wife; Chirag and Suhasi's mother (2000–2001) (2007–2008)
- Hussain Kuwajerwala / Amit Mistry as Chirag Virani – Himmat and Daksha's son; Prajakta's husband (2000–2004) / (2006–2007)
- Tuhina Vohra as Prajakta Virani – Chirag's wife; Savri, Bavri & Hitesh's mother (2000–2007)
- Masumi Mevawala as Savri Virani – Chirag and Prajakta's elder daughter (2006–2007)
- Amita Chandekar as Bavri Virani – Chirag and Prajakta's younger daughter (2006–2007)
  - Hansika Motwani / Chandni Bhagwanani as Child Bavri Virani (2002) / (2003–2005)
- Aditya Kapadia as Hitesh Virani – Chirag and Prajakta's son (2007)
- Pooja Ghai Rawal as Suhasi Virani Mehta – Daksha and Himmat's daughter; Rakesh's wife (2000–2006)
- Prashant Bhatt as Rakesh Mehta – Suhasi's husband; Aniket and Tushar's father (2001–2006)
- Shabbir Ahluwalia as Aniket Mehta – Rakesh's son; Suhasi's step-son (2002)
- Karanvir Bohra / Pradeep Kharab / Sameer Sharma as Tushar Mehta – Rakesh and Suhasi's son; Kanika's husband (2002) / (2002-2005) / (2006)
- Gunjan Walia as Kanika Mehta – Tushar's wife (2006)
- Muni Jha as Jamnadas "JD" Virani – Amba and Govardhan's youngest son; Gayatri's husband (2000–2004)
- Kamalika Guha Thakurta as Gayatri Virani – Jamnadas's wife; Hemant and Sejal's mother (2000–2008)
- Shakti Anand as Hemant Virani – Jamnadas and Gayatri's son; Pooja's husband; Sahil and Tarun's father (2000–2004)
- Prachi Shah as Pooja Singhania Virani – Rajiv's widow; Hemant's wife; Sahil and Tarun's mother (2000–2004)
- Sandeep Baswana / Amit Sarin as Sahil Virani – Hemant and Pooja's elder son; Tripti's second ex-husband; Ganga's second husband (2002–2004; 2006–2008) / (2004–2006)
- Shilpa Saklani as Ganga Joshi Virani – Gautam's ex-wife; Sahil's first wife; Lakshya's mother (2002–2008)
- Suvarna Jha as Tripti Virani: Sahil's second ex-wife; Rishabh's wife (2006–2008)
- Abhijit Khurana / Alok Arora as Tarun Virani – Hemant and Pooja's younger son (2002–2003) / (2003-2004)
- Pulkit Samrat / Yash Pandit as Lakshya Virani – Ganga and Sahil's son; Vaidehi's husband. (2006–2008) / (2008)
- Tia Bajpai as Vaidehi Virani – Tripti's adoptive daughter; Lakshya's wife (2008)
- Khyaati Khandke Keswani as Sejal Virani Gandhi – Jamnadas and Gayatri's daughter; Hemant's sister; Anand's wife; Indira's mother (2000–2006)
- Romanchak Arora as Anand Gandhi – Sejal's husband; Indira's father (2001–2004)
- Karishma Tanna as Indira Gandhi – Sejal and Anand's daughter (2002-2005)

=== Recurring ===
- Abir Goswami as Ajay (2001)
- Pratap Sachdev as Pratap Mehra – Payal's husband; Vishal and Urvashi's father; Pushkar's grandfather (2002)
- Sonal Chainani as Urvashi Mehra – Payal and Pratap's daughter; Vishal's sister (2002)
- Induben Mehta as Godawari (2003)
- Sandeep Mohan as Inspector Rudraneel Rathore (2003)
- Ekta Kapoor as Herself (guest appearance) (2003)
- Utkarsha Naik as Pragya Virani Sanghvi – Amba and Govardhan's daughter; Mansukh, Himmat and Jamnadas's sister; Naveen's wife; Vikram's mother (2000–2004)
- Pratim Parekh as Naveen Sanghvi – Pragya's husband; Vikram's father (2004)
- Rakesh Paul as Vikram Sanghvi – Naveen and Pragya's son; Vaishali's husband (2004)
- Sunny Moza as Sunny (2004)
- Cezanne Khan as Rizwan Khan: Razia's husband (2004)
- Aashka Goradia as Razia Khan: Rizwan's wife (2004)
- Eijaz Khan as Zuber Khan (2004; 2006)
- Hemant Choudhary as Inspector Ashutosh Gaekwad (2004–2005)
- Salim Shah as Aditya Gujral – Mandira's husband; Ansh's adoptive father; Raj's accomplice (2004–2006)
- Shubhavi Choksey as Advocate Meera Singhania – Tulsi's former friend; Mihir's obsessive lover; Savita's murderer (2004–2006)
- Vishal Puri as Raj Bhasin – Kesar's former lover; Harsh and Abir's father (2004–2007)
- Deepak Verma as Rahul (2005)
- Chaitanya Choudhury as Kabir Patel (2005)
- Parmeet Sethi as Ravi (2005)
- Manish Khanna as Advocate Mehta (2005)
- Jeetendra as Jitesh Kothari (2005)
- Anuradha Patel as Bharti Jitesh Kothari (2005)
- Sandeep Rajora as Inspector Aryan (2005–2006)
- Ekta Sharma as Riddhi: Meera's Younger Sister (2005–2006)
- Makrand Deshpande as Advocate Vijay Saxena – Virani family lawyer (2005–2008)
- Moon Banerjee as Shraddha Virani – Ansh's wife; Eklavya's mother. (2006)
- Suhasini Mulay as Kaushalya Malhotra – Tanya's mother (2006)
- Chetan Hansraj as Inspector Maan Singh Chauhan (2006)
- Sakshi Tanwar as Parvati Agarwal/Janki Devi Dixit (2006; 2008)
- Ali Asgar as Kamal Agarwaal (2006; 2008)
- Mita Vashisht as Trishna Agarwal (2006; 2008)
- Aruna Irani as Narayani Devi (2006)
- Vikram Acharya/Nikhil Guharoy as Kabir Sikand (2006)
- Nikhil Arya / Parag Tyagi as Aseem Gupta – Nandini's ex husband (2006) / (2006–2007)
- Hasan Zaidi as Advocate Aditya Rai Singhania – A lawyer who supposed as Parth Virani (2007)
- Gautami Kapoor as Juhi Thakral – Fake Tulsi Virani (2007–2008)
- Ram Kapoor as Shadab / Jas Thakral / Ram Kapoor (2005; 2007–2008)
- Salil Acharya as Billy Thakral (2007)
- Prabhat Bhattacharya as Rishabh Malhotra: Tripti's second husband (2007–2008)
- Sudha Chandran as Renuka Chaudhary/ACP Ragini Suryavanshi (2007–2008)
- Yash Tonk as Shiv Singhania: Ganga's obsessive lover (2008)
- Kratika Sengar as Sugandhi (2008)

== Production ==
=== Directors ===
The show was directed by many directors starting with Kaushik Ghatak who initially directed the series for 150 episodes. As it progressed, it was directed by Ashish Patil, Nivedita Basu, Suraj Rao, Santosh Badal, Dharmesh Shah, Santram Varma, Santosh Bhatt, Garry Bhinder, Deepak Chavan, Sanotsh Bhatt, Fahad Kashmiri, Avhiroop Mazzumdar, Jeetu Arora, Santosh Kolhe, Vicky Chauhan, Rohit Dwivedi, Deepak Sharma, Shyam Maheshwari, Talat Jani, Hitesh Tejwani, Anoop Chaudhary and V.G Roy.

=== Development ===
The shooting of the serial began on 7 April 2000. On 13 April 2005, the serial completed 1000 episodes which aired for 45 minutes rather than usual 30 minutes where producer Ekta Kapoor herself was seen in the episode. Aksahdeep Saigal's entry scene in 2004 as Ansh Gujral was the serial's costliest scene shot which cost about Rs. 5 Lakhs.

The show took a leap in story three times including 20 years leap on 18 February 2002, followed by a 3 years leap and again a 20 years leap on 7 June 2006.

Before its premiere, the serial's name was Amma, but actor and director Sachin Pilgaonkar gave it the name Saas Bhi Kabhi Bahu Thi to Balaji Telefilms. Kyunki was added to the beginning of the name by Ekta Kapoor.

Besides shooting in India, the series was filmed in foreign locations including Sydney, Australia in 2003 and Switzerland. In India the series was filmed at Mumbai's Powai, Kandivali, Film City at Goregaon.

In 2007 and 2008, the series had a crossover with Kahaani Ghar Ghar Kii.

=== Casting ===
The character Mihir was named after Ekta Kapoor's school friend Mihir Shah. The character Tulsi was adopted from Harkishan Mehta's work, Jad Chetan.

Earlier, Jignesh Gandhi was cast as Mihir. However, later the role's contenders were Amar Upadhyay and Cezzane Khan. Upadhyay was chosen while Khan went for Kasautii Zindagii Kay. Smiti Irani, auditioning among many girls, was initially rejected by the production house casting team stating her as 'not fit for TV'. But, producer Ekta Kapoor overruled them and cast her as Tulsi having great faith in her.

After Amar Upadhyay quit in 2001, after the death of his character, nationwide protests made him return. In 2002, on a generation leap, Upadhyay quit to venture into Bollywood and was replaced by Inder Kumar. After Kumar quit later that year, he was replaced by Ronit Roy as Mihir who played the role until the end.

In June 2007, Smriti Irani playing Tulsi quit the serial as she was busy producing her serials and was replaced by Gautami Kapoor. However, in April 2008, Irani returned and Kapoor's character was revealed as Tulsi's imposter.

=== Cancellation ===
On 10 October 2008, a notice was sent to the production house by the channel to terminate the serial by 10 November 2008 stating the declining ratings since July 2008.

To save the series from cancellation, the production house took Star TV to Bombay High Court seeking for the stay order asserting that they had a contract through March 2009 and that the channel had not provided appropriate promotion while the channel pointed out the cancellation due to declining ratings as per agreement. The court refused the stay order and the claims were dismissed on 3 November 2008. The series went off air on 6 November 2008.

== Reception ==
=== Critics ===
Shailaja Bajpai from The Indian Express said, "Kyunki...'s success was due to the fact that it was a universal story that appealed to everyone. It was a winning combination of piety and family. The show celebrated all the big festivals, it was all packaged very well, there was drama and melodrama."

Another report from The Indian Express praising on the ratings delivered during its airing time slot said, "While prime-time television viewing is between 8 to 11 pm, the 9 to 10 pm block was considered safe because it delivered better ratings during the days of the weeklies. But the rule of game changed with Kyunki Saas Bhi Kabhi Bahu Thi and Kahanii Ghar Ghar Kii which made the late prime-time (10 to 11 pm) extremely popular." The ratings delivered by this series in its slot was not achieved by any other shows launched after its off airing.

The Tribune, comparing women's depiction in the series with some of the Star World English series stated, "The women in Ally McBeal or Friends are nothing like those in Kyunki... or Kahaani Ghar.... Professionally competent, in control of their lives they are not to be held back by any stereotypical demands made on them. Perhaps one of the reasons for its (Kyunki...) success is the strong element of empathy it evokes.... what it depicts is probably kahaani ghar ghar ki (The story of every house)."

=== Ratings ===
Produced with the backdrop of Mumbai and the concept of a Gujarati joint family, the show made Producer Ekta Kapoor and Star Plus achieve lots of success, by not only being the number 1 show on Indian Television which ran for eight constant long years, but also receiving TRPs.

It was the consistently most watched Hindi GEC (general entertainment channel) overall until 2005 and the following years saw its position consistently in top five television programs.

Until five weeks after its premiere, the ratings did not languish. After that, it started to rise gradually and also became the second most watched Hindi show of 2000 after Kaun Banega Crorepati with an average TRP of 6.4. In 2001, it averaged 12.04 TVR. In 2002 and 2003, it had an average of 12.50 and 12.30 TVR while in 2004 it was 11.42 TVR with a peak of 19.41 TVR maintaining its top position mostly with its higher ratings.

In March 2001, the series garnered its all-time high ratings of 22.4 TVR when the lead character Mihir returned to life on popular demand and protests. In week during 7 May to 13 May 2001, it was at first position with 16.6 TVR. On 24 May 2001, it garnered 14.7 TVR. On the week ending 26 September 2001, it topped the TRP list with 18.8 TVR. From 14 October to 20 October 2001 it garnered 12.74 TVR while during the same time in the next year 2002, it garnered 9.84 TVR.

In third week of August 2002, it maintained its top position garnering 15.9 TVR.

On week ending 22 November 2003, it was the most watched with 10.1 TVR.

In 2005, it remained the most watched Hindi show however with about 10 TVR garnered lesser than previous years. As months passed, the TVR of the series decreased from double digits to single digit after 2006 due to fragmentation in viewership, however mostly maintaining its top position until months before its end. In week ending 1 March 2006, it maintained its top position garnering 9 TVR. It achieved its highest ratings of 14.17, 14.31 and 13 TVR on 31 July 2006, 29 August 2006 and 4 September 2006 during the year.

During the second week of January 2007, it garnered 6.3 TVR. In early March 2007, it garnered 4 TVR while in early June, it got 4.4 TVR. The sequence of Irani as Tulsi shown killed when she quit before being temporarily replaced by Gautami Kapoor made the ratings to increase to 7.81 and 8.09 TVR before which it was getting about 6 TVR in that year, maintaining its position in top 5 programs. After Irani was replaced by Gautami Kapoor as Tulsi in June 2007, the TVR dropped while it lost its number one position averaging 4.5 TVR while in that month it averaged 6.66 TVR overall. On 21 July 2007, it dropped to 5.3 TVR. Towards the last week in September 2007, it was beaten by Banoo Main Teri Dulhann with Kyunki... garnering 5.51 TVR and Banoo... getting 5.62 TVR. However overall, it was one of the top rated series of the year with its rating garnered less than the previous years.

In early 2008, Kyunki... had an average of 5 TVR, being one of the most watched series while on eventually it dropped to 2.5 TVR months before its end which made the channel to axe the series. As in week 17 of 2008, it garnered 5.5 TVR. In week ending 9 August 2008, it garnered 2.51 TVR occupying twentieth position. The final episode garnered 5.4 million viewership.

=== Accolades ===
The show also went on to receive several awards, most of which were won by Smriti Irani for her portrayal of the ideal character Tulsi. It also won Best Continuing Series at Indian Telly Awards for six consecutive years (2002–2007) and won Best Serial (Popular) for five consecutive years (2001–2005) at Indian Television Academy Awards.

The show is the longest ran daily soap on Indian television during the 2000s, running from 2000 to 2008 and completing 1833 episodes and was first Indian soap opera to cross 1000 episodes in the history of Indian Television and also entered the Limca Book of Records.

=== Impact ===
The death of the lead character Mihir Virani in early 2001 lead to fan protest marches to bring the character back. The return of Mihir Virani in March 2001 brought an all-time high rating of 22.4 TVR, despite airing at late night slot of 10:30 pm (IST), which has been one of the highest ratings ever achieved by an Indian serial.

In January 2001, despite the earthquake in Gujarat, people switched on their television sets for watching this series.

In February 2003, The Times of India reported that people started recreating the grand sets of the series in their homes in Kolkata.

In 2001, a conflict arose between Star India and the production house over the Tamil series titled Kelunga Mamiyare Neengalum Marumagal Than (trans. Listen mother-in- law, you were also a daughter-in-law) which began airing from April 2001 on Sun TV. While Star stated it as an exact copy of this series violating the copyright without their knowledge, Balaji Telefilms pointed only little similarities with the title meaning and the lead character name being similar. CEO of Balaji Telefilms Sanjay Doshi stated that the script of the Tamil series was already changed after episode 15.

In September 2001, the series was blacked out in Saurashtra when Rajputs protested for naming a dog in the series as Saint Jalamsinh Jadeja. Soon, it was sorted out when Balaji Telefilms apologized for it stating it unintentional.

In January 2002, the company Procter & Gamble, for advertising their detergent brand Tide, aired a spoof of the series consisting of the cast Smriti Irani, Aparna Mehta and Muni Jha of the series which was telecast on a rival channel. Both Star and Balaji Telefilms reported it as a copyright violation considering the advertisement which uses the same sets, backdrop, announcement fonts and music along with the cast of the series. Star filed a case against Leo Burnett (Star India v Leo Burnett) and the case was heard before Bombay court in 2003.

In February 2002, Brihanmumbai Municipal Corporation lodged a FIR at Andheri police station against Star TV and Balaji Telefilms when the episode aired on 5 February 2002 showed the character Puja undergoing sex determination test of her unborn child and also the doctor encouraging her for the child being a son. As per Pre-natal Diagnostic Technology (Regulation & Prevention of Misuse) Act of 1994, the test is illegal in India. Many NGOs and state women's organisations also protested against the episode's sequence. However, both Kapoor and Star were asked for an apology for portraying it to which Kapoor said, "It was not intentional. There was a slight lapse on the part of the writer of the script." while Star stated it as a genuine mistake and apologised in a subsequent episode.

In November 2004, Kapoor was summoned by National Commission for Women and Star was sent a notice following complaints from many women's groups for showing a marital rape sequence of character Nandhini by Ansh Gujral for 15 minutes in the episode aired on 14 October 2004 claiming it more sensitive considering the viewership of the series by all age groups. Kapoor's lawyer stated that they will appear on 1 December 2004, along with a copy of the episode to submit to them, while the channel defended that they were mindful of their programs and they are for general viewing. However, when Kapoor failed to appear on that day, sending her two lawyers to represent her, the case was adjourned for Kapoor's appearance on 14 December 2004. However, on her demand, it was further adjourned to 3 January 2005.

The series was dubbed in Dari language and was aired on Tolo TV in Afghanistan since 2005 becoming the first Indian television series to air there and gained huge popularity. But it was soon banned along with all other Indian series aired in 2008 with many complaints arising over the show's content.

In January 2006, protests in front of Balaji Telefilms office at Andheri took place against the depicted scene of mercy killing, which was illegal then in India, of character Savitha carried out by the lead character Tulsi in the series. However Kapoor stated, "I dealt with marital rape in Kyunki…, didn't I? Then why can't I show euthanasia? TV is fiction and we are only bringing up social issues. If there is any problem, my legal department will take care of it." while Star India's senior creative director Shailaja Kejriwal stated, "We at Star, along with Balaji Telefilms, have decided to take up (through the serials) social issues that are not talked about openly. We just though that euthanasia is a subject of great importance… we should talk about it and keep the topic alive." Smriti Irani playing Tulsi, said that she doesn't support mercy killing while she, who was uncomfortable doing it, said that she did the sequence considering that she would have been labelled as an unprofessional actor had she refused.

In January 2008, the dialogue "You and your God, go to hell" pointing against Lord Vishnu in an episode said by the antagonist Suvarna Jha playing Tripti hurt the sentiments of many people and the Vaishnav community. Protests and rallies were held in Junagadh led by the priests and various Vaishnav followers who also submitted a memo to the district collector for Balaji Telefilms, Producer Ekta Kapoor and Suvarna Jha to apologise for it. Many also criticised it as a move for increasing ratings. However, Kapoor stated that it was not their intention and they also, having Vishnu in their faith, requested apology from everyone.

In February 2008, Pulkit Samrat playing Lakshya got a notice from court stating his absence for shooting and no response to phone calls from production house while Samrat stated that he attended the shoots regularly but was idle for most of the time with inconsequential scenes and so wished to work on other series. The problem arose when he earlier complained to the production house for non-payment of his dues and their contract which does not permit him to work for other production houses. After these incidents he went to court and was relieved from the series and production house after the verdict.

In 2009, the series was criticised glorifying social evils along with few other Indian television shows during the discussions in the Indian Parliament.

Acknowledging the impact of some of her shows including Kyunki..., Ekta Kapoor stated, "They were heavily stylised and melodramatic. But they actually gave Indian women a voice. There's research that shows that after cable penetration, from about 2001 to 2005, which is when my shows ran, India, for the first time, saw women take decisions on family issues. This had never happened before, and it was directly linked to the fact that we made the women in our shows do this."

== Adaptations ==
It was remade during 2007 in Tamil language in Sri Lanka.

== Awards ==
Indian Telly Awards

Year	Category	Recipient	Role
2002	Best Actress of The Year	Smriti Irani	Tulsi Virani
2002	Best Television Personality	Amar Upadhyay	Mihir Virani
2002	Best TV Show of The Year	Ekta Kapoor	
2002	Best Continuing TV Show	Ekta Kapoor	
2003	Best Actress of The Year	Smriti Irani	Tulsi Virani
2003	Best Television Personality	Smriti Irani	Tulsi Virani
2003	Best Daily Serial	Ekta Kapoor	
2003	Best Continuing TV Programme	Ekta Kapoor	
2004	Best Actor of The Year	Hiten Tejwani	Karan Virani
2004	Best Continuing TV Programme	Ekta Kapoor	
2005	Best Child Artiste (Female)	Chinky Jaiswal	Bhoomi Virani
2005	Best Actor in a Supporting Role	Hiten Tejwani	Karan Virani
2005	Best Actress in a Supporting Role	Gauri Pradhan Tejwani	Nandini Virani
2005	Best Actor in a Negative Role	Akashdeep Saighal	Ansh Gujral
2005	Best Continuing TV Programme	Ekta Kapoor	
2006	Best Actor in a Supporting Role	Hiten Tejwani	Karan Virani
2006	Best Fresh New Face (Male)	Pulkit Samrat	Lakshya Virani
2006	Best Television Personality	Ronit Roy	Mihir Virani
2006	Best Continuing TV Programme	Ekta Kapoor	
2007	Best Actor in a Supporting Role (Critics)	Hiten Tejwani	Karan Virani
2007	Best Actress in a Supporting Role (Popular)	Gauri Pradhan Tejwani	Nandini Virani
2007	Best Continuing Serial	Ekta Kapoor	
2010	Best Actor of The Decade	Ronit Roy	Mihir Virani

Indian Television Academy Awards

Year	Category	Recipient	Role
2001	Best Actor (Popular)	Amar Upadhyay	Mihir Virani
2001	Best Actress (Popular)	Smriti Irani	Tulsi Virani
2001	Best Serial (Popular)	Ekta Kapoor	
2001	Best Star Cast	Ekta Kapoor	
2002	Best Actress (Popular)	Smriti Irani	Tulsi Virani
2002	Best Serial (Popular)	Ekta Kapoor	
2003	Best Actor (Popular)	Ronit Roy	Mihir Virani
2003	Best Actress (Popular)	Smriti Irani	Tulsi Virani
2003	Best Serial (Popular)	Ekta Kapoor	
2003	Best Audiography	Vikas Patil	
2004	Best Actor (Popular)	Ronit Roy	Mihir Virani
2004	Best Actress (Popular)	Smriti Irani	Tulsi Virani
2004	Best Serial (Popular)	Ekta Kapoor	
2005	Best Actor (Popular)	Hiten Tejwani	Karan Virani
2005	Best Actress (Popular)	Smriti Irani	Tulsi Virani
2005	Best Serial (Popular)	Ekta Kapoor	
2005	Best Supporting Actress (Jury)	Shilpa Saklani	Ganga Virani
2006	Best Teleplay (Jury)	Anil Nagpal	
2010	ITA Milestone Award	Sudha Shivpuri; Apara Mehta; Smriti Irani; Hiten Tejwani; Sumeet Sachdev	Baa; Savita; Tulsi; Karan; Gautam

=== Others ===
Year	Award	Category	Recipient	Role
2002	Kalakar Awards	Best Actor (Popular)	Amar Upadhyay	Mihir Virani
2004	Kalakar Awards	Best Actor (Popular)	Ronit Roy	Mihir Virani
2004	Kalakar Awards	Best Actress (Popular)	Jaya Bhattacharya	Payal Mehra
2004	Kalakar Awards	Best Serial	Ekta Kapoor	
2004	Kalakar Awards	Best Title Singer	Priya Bhattacharya	

== Sequel ==
A sequel of the show titled Kyunki Saas Bhi Kabhi Bahu Thi 2 was announced on 7 July 2025, in honor of the show completing 25 years. Smriti Irani and Amar Upadhyay returned as Tulsi and Mihir Virani. Season 2 premiered on 29 July 2025 on StarPlus and concluded on 20 October 2026, after airing 450 episodes.

== See also ==
- Star India v Leo Burnett: a court case involving the claim that a commercial imitating the show violated copyright law.
