= Hiten Tejwani =

Indian television actor

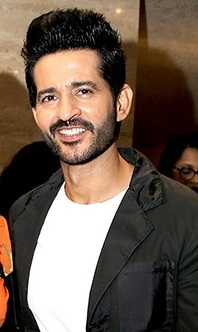
- Tejwani in 2019
- Born: 5 March 1974 (age 52); Maharashtra, India
- Occupations: Model; actor
- Years active: 2000–present
- Notable work: Kutumb; Kyunki Saas Bhi Kabhi Bahu Thi; Kasautii Zindagii Kay; Pavitra Rishta
- Spouse: Gauri Pradhan (m. 2004)
- Children: 2

Hiten Tejwani (born 5 March 1974) is an Indian actor who primarily works in Hindi television and films. Tejwani is best recognised for his portrayal of Pratham Mittal and Pratham Mann in Kutumb, Karan Virani in Kyunki Saas Bhi Kabhi Bahu Thi, Anurag Basu in Kasautii Zindagii Kay and Manav Deshmukh in Pavitra Rishta.

== Early life and family ==
Tejwani was born into a Sindhi Hindu family.

He married his Kutumb and Kyunki Saas Bhi Kabhi Bahu Thi co-star Gauri Pradhan on 29 April 2004. The couple became parents to twins, son Nevaan and daughter Katya on 11 November 2009.

In an interview, he revealed that he had been married once before, but went through a painful divorce in 2001.

== Career ==
Tejwani played a role in Ekta Kapoor's serial Ghar Ek Mandir, which was aired on Sony TV. This was followed by appearances in Kapoor's soaps Kabhii Sautan Kabhii Sahelii on Metro Gold, Kaahin Kissii Roz on Star Plus, and Kutumb on Sony TV with Gauri Pradhan. He appeared again with Pradhan in the second season of Kutumb, and Kapoor took the same couple in her show Kyunki Saas Bhi Kabhi Bahu Thi. When Kutumb ended, he was offered the role of Karan Virani in Kapoor's series Kyunki Saas Bhi Kabhi Bahu Thi on Star Plus. In 2009, he and his wife also made a short cameo in the Star Plus show Kumkum – Ek Pyara Sa Bandhan. In 2006, Tejwani along with his wife Gauri participated in the second season of Nach Baliye 2 and returned to host Season 4 in 2008.

He played Anurag Basu in Kasautii Zindagii Kay, replacing Cezanne Khan in the role.

In 2009 and 2010, he also played small or supporting roles in the shows Jasuben Jayantilaal Joshi Ki Joint Family and Kitani Mohabbat Hai on NDTV Imagine, Palampur Express on Sony TV, Chotti Bahu - Sindoor Bin Suhagan on Zee TV and Rang Badalti Odhani on Star One.

In 2011 he appeared in Mukti Bandhan as Vicky Oberoi, where he played the antagonist. Later that year, he was cast again by Kapoor as the lead actor of Pavitra Rishta on Zee TV. Tejwani was nominated for Best Actor in Lead Role at Zee Rishtey Awards, The Global Indian Film and TV Honours, 5th Boroplus Gold Awards, 11th Indian Telly Awards and 12th Indian Television Academy Awards. He also made a cameo appearance in Kapoor's Kya Huaa Tera Vaada, in the role of Jatin Chopra. He appeared in the Sri Lankan television series Pooja, playing a doctor.

In 2013, he appeared in Sanskaar - Dharohar Apno Ki as Murli. He later played Nitin Joshi in Colors TV's Meri Aashiqui Tum Se Hi. In 2015, Tejwani played the role of Dr. Anant in Balika Vadhu. and also played Niranjan Chaturvedi in Gangaa from 2015 to 2017.

In 2017, Tejwani was a celebrity contestant in the Bigg Boss 11, the Indian version of the reality TV show Big Brother, which premiered on 1 October. He survived for 11 weeks until he got evicted on 17 December (Day 77). In 2018, he appeared in Colors TV's show Tantra where he plays a role of Inspector Bharat Singh Rathore. In 2019, he portrayed Viraj Roy in &TV's Daayan. As of February 2019, he was a contestant on Kitchen Champion 5 with his wife Gauri Pradhan Tejwani. Tejwani will play a professor in the upcoming film Nobel Peace.

From 2020 to 2021, he appeared as Shiv Narayan Gupta in Star Bharat's Gupta Brothers. In July 2022, he joined the cast Colors TV's show Swaran Ghar as Arjun Deol. From April 2025 to July 2025, he played Nitin Jaiswal in Colors TV's Meri Bhavya Life. Since July 2025, he returns playing Karan Virani in StarPlus's spiritual sequel of Kyunki Saas Bhi Kabhi Bahu Thi, entitled Kyunki Saas Bhi Kabhi Bahu Thi 2. From August 2026 to November 2026, he portray Dr. Col. Suryakant Thakur in Colors TV's 108 Base Hospital – Uri.

== Filmography ==
=== Film ===
Year	Film	Role
2003	Joggers Park	Akash
2004	Krishna Cottage	Akshay
2007	Anwar	Udit
2014	Entertainment	
2015	Thoda Lutf Thoda Ishq	Jhumroo
2016	Love Games	Gaurav Asthana
2016	Shorgul	Salim
2016	Saansein	C.K. Bir
2019	Kalank	Ahmed
2019	Mudda 370 J&K	Suraj
2020	Unkahee	Abhimanyu
2021	Nobel Peace	Shlok Manhas
2022	Ardh	Satya
2022	Jogi	Inspector Lali
2023	Zindagi Shatranj Hai	Siddharth
2025	Sanghavi and Sons	Asmit Sanghavi
2025	Mano Ya Na Mano (film)	Manav
2025	Jalso - A Family Invitation	
2026	Paatki	Inspector Arjun Thakker

=== Television ===
Year	Serial	Role	Notes	Ref.
2000–2001	Sukanya		Supporting Role	
2001	Ghar Ek Mandir	Gautam	Supporting Role	
2001–2002	Kabhii Sautan Kabhii Sahelii	Praveen	Supporting Role	
2001–2002	Kaahin Kissii Roz	Nakul Sikand	Supporting Role	
2001–2002	Kutumb	Pratham Mittal	Lead Role	
2002–2003	Kutumb	Pratham Mann	Lead Role	
2002–2008	Kyunki Saas Bhi Kabhi Bahu Thi	Karan Virani	Lead Role	
2003	Miit	Akash	Lead Role	
2003	Kya Hadsaa Kya Haqeeqat	Natesh	Episodic Role	
2003	Naam Gum Jayegaa			
2003	Kkusum	Vishal Mehra	Supporting Role	
2003	Kya Hadsaa Kya Haqeeqat – Kab Kyon Kahan	Pratham	Episodic Role	
2004	Kahiin To Hoga	Pratham	Cameo Role	
2004–2005	Kkoi Dil Mein Hai	Samay Punj	Lead Role	
2005	Kesar	Abhinav "Abhi" Pandey	Lead Role	
2005–2006	Kkavyanjali	Yug Mittal	Negative Role	
2006	Kaisa Ye Pyar Hai	Nishant Saxena	Supporting Role	
2006–2007; 2008	Karam Apnaa Apnaa	Anupam Bhattacharya	Supporting Role	
2007	Kasamh Se	Anupam Kapadia	Episodic Role	
2007–2008	Kasautii Zindagii Kay	Anurag Basu / Pratham Mittal	Lead Role	
2008	Left Right Left	Colonel Abhay Verma	Cameo Role	
2008	Kahaani Hamaaray Mahaabhaarat Ki	Karna	Supporting Role	
2008–2009	Jasuben Jayantilaal Joshi Ki Joint Family	Ronit	Supporting Role	
2009	Kumkum – Ek Pyara Sa Bandhan	Ranveer Singh	Supporting Role	
2009	Kitani Mohabbat Hai	Karan Singh	Supporting Role	
2009	Palampur Express	Dev Sisodia	Supporting Role	
2009	Kya Mast Hai Life	Mr. Singhania	Supporting Role	
2010	Chotti Bahu – Sindoor Bin Suhagan	Shantanu Purohit	Negative Role	
2011	Rang Badalti Odhani	Anand Mittal		
2011	Mukti Bandhan	Vicky Oberoi		
2011–2014	Pavitra Rishta	Manav Deshmukh	Lead Role	
2012; 2013	Kya Huaa Tera Vaada	Jatin Chopra	Lead Role	
2013	Sanskaar – Dharohar Apnon Ki	Krishna / Murli	Cameo Role	
2013–2014	Savdhaan India	Host		
2014	MTV Webbed	Professor	Episodic Role	
2014	Hamari Sister Didi	Dr. Avinash "Avi" Kapoor	Cameo Role	
2014–2015	Meri Aashiqui Tum Se Hi	Nitin Joshi	Cameo Role	
2015	Rishton Ka Mela	Rahul	Cameo Role	
2015–2016	Balika Vadhu	Dr. Anant	Cameo Role	
2015–2017	Gangaa	Judge Niranjan Chaturvedi	Cameo Role	
2016	Darr Sabko Lagta Hai – Siskiyaan	Sushant	Episode 32	
2018–2019	Tantra	Inspector Bharat Singh Rathore		
2019	Daayan	Viraj Roy	Negative Role	
2019	Haiwaan: The Monster	Deepak Agnihotri	Cameo Role	
2019	CIF	Inspector Kesari Kumar	Episodic Role	
2020–2021	Gupta Brothers	Shiv Gupta	Lead Role	
2022	Swaran Ghar	Arjun Deol	Lead Role	
2022–2023	Bade Achhe Lagte Hain 2	Lakhan Kapoor	Lead Role	
2023–2024	Pashminna – Dhaage Mohabbat Ke	Avinash Sharma	Lead Role	
2025	Meri Bhavya Life	Nitin Jaiswal		
2025–2026	Kyunki Saas Bhi Kabhi Bahu Thi 2	Karan Virani		
2026	108 Base Hospital – Uri	Dr. Col. Suryakant Thakur		

=== Reality shows ===
Year	Show	Role	Ref.	Co–Star
2006	Jodee Kamaal Ki	Contestant		Gauri Pradhan
2006	Nach Baliye 2	Contestant		Gauri Pradhan
2007	Koffee With Karan 2	Guest		
2008	Kya Aap Paanchvi Pass Se Tez Hain?	Contestant		Gauri Pradhan
2008	Kabhi Kabhii Pyaar Kabhi Kabhii Yaar	Contestant		Gauri Pradhan
2008	Nach Baliye 4	Host		Gauri Pradhan
2011	Swayamvar	Host		
2014–2015	Box Cricket League	Contestant		
2016	Box Cricket League 2	Contestant		
2017	Bigg Boss 11	Contestant		
2017	Entertainment Ki Raat	Guest		
2018	Box Cricket League 3	Contestant		
2018	Bigg Boss 12	Guest		
2019	Kitchen Champion 5	Guest		Gauri Pradhan
2019	Box Cricket League 4	Contestant		
2019	Bigg Boss 13	Guest		

=== Web series ===
Year	Show	Role	Notes
2018–2019	Karrle Tu Bhi Mohabbat	Advocate Ved Saxena	
2019	The Investigation	ACP Vishal Gaekwad	
2019	D-Code (Deewangi)	Ravi	
2020	Ashuddhi	Karan Oberoi	
2021	Tandav	Ajay Ahluwalia	
2021	Games of Karma (BDSM)	Sikander Oberoi	
2022	Swaanng	Manohar pincha	
2022	The Joker: A Strange Kidnapper	Pratap	
2023	Kaala	Bismil	

=== Music video appearances ===
Year	Title	Singer
2022	"Mera Pyara Hindustan"	Romy

== Awards ==
Year	Awards	Category	Nominated	Results
2005	Indian Television Academy Awards, India	Best Actor - Popular	Kyunki Saas Bhi Kabhi Bahu Thi	Winner
