= Shagufta Ali =

Indian film and television actress

- Born: 7 April 1967 (age 59); Mumbai, India
- Occupation: Actress
- Years active: 1989–present
- Father: Late Shahid Bijnori (actor)

Shagufta Ali is an Indian film and television actress. Her first film was Kanoon Apna Apna in 1989, which starred Dilip Kumar, Nutan, Sanjay Dutt and Madhuri Dixit in pivotal roles. Her television debut was in the same year with Dard. She is known for her roles in Punar Vivah, Ek Veer Ki Ardaas...Veera, Sasural Simar Ka and Saath Nibhaana Saathiya. In 2018, she was seen in Colors TV's Bepannaah. She danced in an item song in the Tamil movie Uzhaippali with Rajinikanth.

In a recent interview on Siddhant Kannan's podcast she said that she never married and mentioned that despite their efforts, something always happened so that the wedding plans got postponed each time. Her unnamed love interest died in 2011 after a 26 year relationship. He had complications arising from recurrent mouth ulcers.

She is a stage III breast cancer survivor and credits Rohit Shetty and mainly Ashok Pandit for helping her financially. She also credits Ashok Pandit and Johny Lever for working a lot on her.

Shagufta is the daughter of the late actor Shahid Bijnori.

== Television ==
- 1989: Dard
- 1990: Agar Aisa Ho To
- 1993-1998: Kanoon
- 1993-1998: Parampara as Barkha
- 1993: Junoon
- 1993-95: Zee Horror Show
- 1998-99Saans
- 2001-05 Dishayen
- 2002-05 Sanjivani: A Medical Boon
- 2004: Isse Kehte Hai Golmaal Ghar
- 2005 - 2010: Woh Rehne Waali Mehlon Ki
- 2006-08 Zaara
- 2010 Sasural Genda Phool
- 2011 Sasural Simar Ka as Sugandha/Arti
- 2012 Punar Vivah as Vimla
- 2012 Madhubala – Ek Ishq Ek Junoon as Shobha Choudhary
- 2013 - 2015: Ek Veer Ki Ardaas...Veera as Mrs. Singh
- 2013: Adaalat
- 2016–2017: Saath Nibhaana Saathiya as Urvashi Singh
- 2018: Bepannaah

== Filmography ==
- Aruna Kiranam (1986) (Telugu film)
- Geeta Ki Saugandh (1988)
- Kanoon Apna Apna (1989) as Basanti
- Khooni Murda (1989) as Rekha
- Apmaan Ki Aag (1990) as Shayri Teller Girl
- Ek Number Ka Chor (1990)
- Indrajeet (1991) as Reshmi Zulfein
- Ganga Jamuna Ki Lalkar (1991)
- Ajooba (1991)
- Roohani Taaqat (1991)
- Ajooba Kudrat Ka (1991)
- Vyah Da Dhol (1991) (Punjabi film)
- Giraft (1992)
- Kisme Kitna Hai Dum (1992) as Mangla
- Insaan Bana Shaitan (1992)
- Gardish (1993) as a Bar dancer (cameo)
- Baghi Soormey (1993) (Punjabi film)
- Divya Shakti (1993)
- I Love India (1993) (Tamil film)
- Uzhaippali (1993) (Tamil film)
- Pathreela Raasta (1994)
- Chauraha (1994)
- Kachehri (1994) (Punjabi film)
- Sindoor Ki Holi (1996)
- Hind Ki Beti (1996)
- Hero No. 1 (1997) as Paro Tripathi
- Ganga Maange Khoon (1997)
- Banarasi Babu (1997)
- Badmaash (1998) as Shagufta
- Mehndi (1998)
- Sirf Tum (1999) as Aarti's Sister
- Inteqam Aurat Ka (1999)
- Rajaji (1999)
- International Khiladi (1999) as Rahul's Mother
- Apradhi Kaun (2000)
- Nidaan (2000)
- Gang (2000)
- Isi Life Mein (2010) as Maa'sa (Mrs. Khandelwal)
- My Father Godfather (2014) as Mamiji
- Laila Majnu (2018) as Laila's aunt
- Tara vs Bilal as Zoya, Bilal Khan's Khaala (Aunt)
