= Waapasi =

- Directed by: Deepak Sharma
- Written by: Deepak Sharma
- Produced by: Vertika Films
- Starring: Rohit Bharadwaj; Dhirendra Gupta; Aruna Shetty; N.K Pant; Moonis Khan
- Cinematography: Arun Varma
- Edited by: Pallavi Singhal
- Music by: Millind Trivedi
- Release dates: 2013 (Dada Saheb); 21 June 2015
- Running time: 24:07 minutes
- Country: India
- Language: Punjabi

Waapasi (transl. Return) is a 2013 Punjabi short film written and directed by Deepak Sharma and produced by Vertika Films. Starring Rohit Bharadwaj, the film is based on the strong clash of emotions that anyone away from home may go through. The story is about Hardeep, who left his home for Australia on student's visa as he wanted to do something in his life and for his family. However, after a period of time he misses his family and decides to return to his loved ones. However, on his return he realises that his family is now habituate of his absence. The film was released online by Pocket Films on 21 June 2015.

== Synopsis ==
Hardeep set off for Australia on a student visa, driven by his dream to see the world and create a better future for himself and his family. It has now been five years since Hardeep, known as Harry to his new friends, left home. In this time abroad, he embraced various jobs, including driving taxis and working at a petrol station. College and attending classes became more of a routine task than a passionate pursuit for him.

Back home, there have been lot of changes in the lifestyle of Harry's family after he left for Australia. Somewhere, they were initially dependent on the money sent by him and now are used to it. There is one more thing that they are used to, and that is Harry's absence.

A stage comes when Harry realises that there is nothing worth for him in Australia, away from his family. Hence, he decides to return to his home and this time forever. But on his return he realises that he is now a guest in his family and not a member of who is being missed. His family and dear ones have made a mindset that he will be going back and they are used to his absence. They have expectations from him, which are dependent on his return.

Will Hardeep stay back home to become the member of his family or will he return like the guests do? Waapasi is the journey of Harry's return.

== Cast ==
- Rohit Bharadwaj as Hardeep
- Dhirendra Gupta as Kishanchand (Father)
- Aruna Shetty as Sarla (Mother)
- N. K. Pant as Servant
- Moonis Khan as Surjeet (brother)
- Manisha Malhotra as Rano (sister)

== Recognition ==
Waapasi was screened at the Punjabi International Film Festival 2013 that was held in Toronto. The film was part of Cannes Film Festival 2014. It was also screened in the Shimla Film Festival (SFF) 2014, Nashik International Film Festival (NIFF) 2014 as well as Ma Boli Punjabi Film Festival that was held in Vancouver.

== Awards and nominations ==
- 2013 - Best Short Film – Jury Award at the 3rd Dada Saheb Film Festival 2013
- 2013 - Best Actor Award (Rohit Bhardwaj) at the 3rd Dada Saheb Film Festival 2013
- 2014 - Best Director Award (Deepak Sharma) at the Noida International Film Festival 2014
- 2014 - Best Film Award at the PGF Film Festival
