= Kutumb (TV series) =

- Developed by: Ekta Kapoor
- Written by: Mahesh Pandey; Dialogue: Dheeraj Sarna
- Directed by: Bharat Bhatia; Gautam Sobti; Swapna Waghmare Joshi; Santosh Bhatt
- Creative directors: Monisha Singh; Nivedita Basu
- Starring: see below
- Opening theme: "Kutumb" 1 by Shaan and Jaspinder Narula "Kutumb" 2 by Babul Supriyo and Sunidhi Chauhan
- Country of origin: India
- No. of seasons: 2
- No. of episodes: 251

Production
- Producers: Ekta Kapoor; Shobha Kapoor
- Cinematography: Sanjay K. Memane
- Editors: Vikas Sharma; Md. Nazir
- Running time: 24 minutes

Original release
- Network: Sony Entertainment Television
- Release: 29 October 2001 – 16 January 2003

Kutumb is an Indian television drama telecast on Sony TV. The show aired from 29 October 2001 to 7 February 2003. The show had two seasons but the seasons' plots were not related. However, both series revolve around the principal characters of Pratham (Hiten Tejwani) and Gauri (Gauri Pradhan), and their love and kutumb (family).

== Plot ==
The Mittal family is successful and rich but grounded in their traditions and culture. Of the four Mittal sons, the eldest Umesh is married to Gayatri and has three children - Nandini, Pratham and Gautam. Rajesh is married to Archana and they have three children - Samay, Tushar and Diya. Sanjay is a widower, who often has imaginary conversations with his late wife Maya, their three children are - Siddharth, Riya and Richa. Ajay and Kavita have no children of their own and instead dote on the nieces and nephews. The other youngsters who are a part of the family are Sanskar and Sanskriti, who are Umesh's sister's children.

Pratham is revealed to be the spoilt brat in the family yet loved by everyone, much to his father Umesh's frustration.

In contrast, Gauri Agarwal, comes from a middle class nuclear family and takes no nonsense from anyone. Gauri's family includes her father, mother, sister Preeti and brother Shashank.

Pratham's sister, Nandini married young as per her father's wishes but the marriage results in divorce. Her ex-husband also doesn't want anything to do with their son Shobhit. Nandini's father is remorseful for having chosen the wrong man for her and wants her to remarry but she decides marriage is not for her.

At the same college, Gauri hates everything Pratham stands for - a lack of principles and his being rich and entitled. Pratham loses the Class President election to Gauri and to teach her a lesson locks himself with her in a room insinuating they were fooling around. When the media gets whiff of this, the incident is blown out of proportion and their conservative families decide that the two must be married. Pratham takes this as an opportunity to make Gauri's life a living hell. Under family pressure, Gauri gives in and the two are married.

How the two cope with their differences, and eventually fall in love with another form the crux of the story.

The second season shows Pratham as a rich spoilt brat who is disinterested in studies. Gauri on the other hand is the college topper and actively participates in drama activities. Their opposite natures initially lead to fights but while practicing for a college play, they develop feelings for each other. However, Pratham's parents oppose the relationship as they feel Gauri is a middle-class girl and does not fit in with their family.

Pratham and Gauri are very much in love and elope. They face financial hardships but eventually settle down in their new world. Everything is perfect, till Gauri is diagnosed with cancer and is given a few months to live by the doctors. Pratham is shattered but continues to take care of her during her treatment. Gauri is finally cured and Pratham's family also accepts her. But as fate would have it, Gauri soon dies in a car accident instead.

== Cast ==
=== Season 1 ===
- Hiten Tejwani as Pratham Mittal
- Gauri Pradhan as Gauri Pratham Mittal
- Amita Chandekar as Anu
- Sai Ballal as Umesh Mittal, Pratham's Father
- Shama Deshpande as Gayatri Umesh Mittal, Pratham's Mother
- Poonam Narula as Nandini Mittal, Pratham's Sister
- Manorama as Chhoti Dadi, Pratham's Grandmother
- Lily Patel as Badi Dadi, Pratham's Grandmother
- Brijendra Kala as Sanjay Mittal, Pratham's Uncle
- Sakshi Tanwar as Maya Sanjay Mittal
- Rituraj Singh as Ajay Mittal, Pratham's Uncle
- Jayati Bhatia as Kavita Ajay Mittal, Pratham's Aunt
- Ali Asgar as Samay Mittal, Pratham's Cousin
- Pooja Ghai Rawal as Natasha Samay Mittal
- Monalika Bhonsle as Shruti
- Kishwer Merchant as Swati
- Pracheen Chauhan as Tushar Mittal, Pratham's Cousin
- Vaishali Saini as Riya Mittal, Pratham's Cousin
- Varun Badola as Advocate Rahul
- Rohit Bakshi as Ketan
- Shweta Basu Prasad as Vanshita, Anu Daughter
- Harsh Khurana as Manav
- Manoj Bidwai as Gautam
- Dheeraj Sarna as Yash, Pratham's Friend
- Abhijit Khurana as Hiten, Pratham's Friend

=== Season 2 ===
- Hiten Tejwani as Pratham Mann
- Gauri Pradhan as Gauri Pradhan
- Mouli Ganguly as Shweta Chattopadhyay
- Mukul Dev as Abhijat Desai
- Kavita Kaushik as Monica Malhotra
- Simple Kaul as Pratham's Sister
- Girish Jain as Shweta's Friend
- Sheeba Akashdeep / Supriya Karnik as Kamini Mann
- Raju Kher as Aditya Mann
- Prithvi Zutshi as Mr. Pradhan
- Dolly Bindra as Dolly Maasi

== Soundtrack ==
Track #	Title	Singer(s)	Lyricist	Music composer(s)
1	"Title Track"	Shaan, Jaspinder Narula	Nawab Arzoo	Lalit Sen
2	"Title Track Sad Version 1"	Kumar Sanu	Nawab Arzoo	Lalit Sen
3	"Title Track Sad Version 2"	Priya Bhattachariya	Nawab Arzoo	Lalit Sen
