= Rihaee (TV series) =

Rihaee (transl. Bail) is an Indian television crime series that aired on Sony TV, based on the real life crime stories against women. The series premiered on 9 February 2005, and is hosted by Kishwer Merchant & Rajeshwari Sachdev.

== Cast ==
- Rucha Gujarathi as Shalini
- Sandeep Baswana as Rakesh
