= List of accolades received by Bade Achhe Lagte Hain =

List of awards won by Bade Achhe Lagte Hain
Awards and nominations
Award	Won	Nominated
Indian Television Academy Awards	6	19
BIG Star Entertainment Awards	1	5
Lions Gold Awards	9	9
Apsara Film & Television Producers Guild Awards	8	14
FICCI Frames Excellence Honours Awards	3	3
Indian Telly Awards	5	15
Kalakar Awards	1	3
Cinemascapes Awards	1	1
Zee Gold Awards	5	12
People's Choice Awards	3	4
- Tally
Totals	42	85
- Footnotes

Bade Achhe Lagte Hain is an Indian television drama series that premiered on May 30, 2011 on Sony TV and is produced by Shobha Kapoor and Ekta Kapoor under their banner Balaji Telefilms. The show stars Ram Kapoor and Sakshi Tanwar as protagonists.

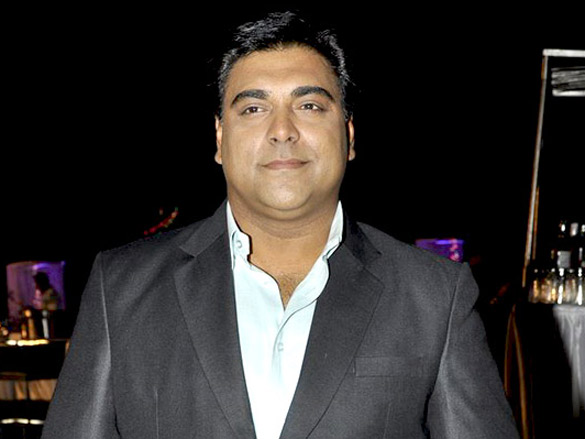

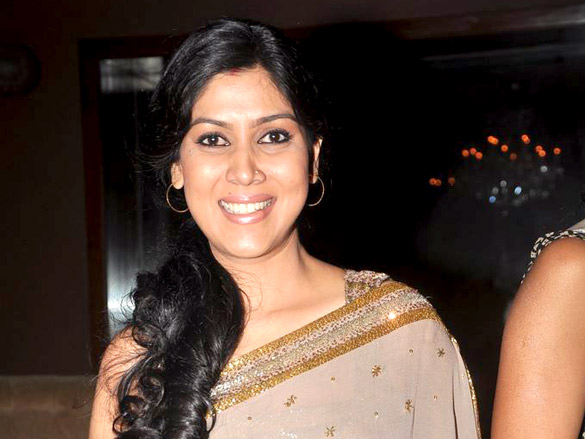
Ram Kapoor (top) Sakshi Tanwar (bottom) have received maximum awards and nominations for the television series.

The show won the Kalakar Award for the Best Serial. In addition, the show has won six Indian Television Academy Awards, three Star Guild Awards, five Indian Telly Awards, three FICCI Frames Excellence Honours and two People's Choice Awards,

== BIG Star Entertainment Awards ==
The BIG Star Entertainment Awards are presented annually by Reliance Broadcast Network Limited in association with STAR India to honour personalities from the field of entertainment across movies, music, television, sports, theater and dance.

Year	Category	Recipient	Result	Citation
2011	BIG Star Most Entertaining Television Actor (Female)	Sakshi Tanwar	Won	
2011	BIG Star Most Entertaining Television Fiction Show	Bade Achhe Lagte Hain	Nominated	
2011	BIG Star Most Entertaining Television Actor (Male)	Ram Kapoor	Nominated	

== Kalakar Awards ==
The Kalakar Awards are given by Bengali Federation of India.

Year	Category	Recipient	Result	Citation
2012	Best Serial	Bade Achhe Lagte Hain	Won	
2012	Best TV Actor In A Lead Role(Female)	Sakshi Tanwar	Nominated	
2012	Best TV Actor In A Lead Role(Male)	Ram Kapoor	Nominated	

== Indian Television Academy Awards ==
The Indian Television Academy Awards, also known as the ITA Awards, is an annual event organised by the Indian Television Academy. The awards are presented in various categories, including popular programming(music, news, entertainment, sports, travel, lifestyle and fashion), best television channel in various categories, technical awards and Best Performance awards.

Year	Event	Category	Recipient	Result	Citation
2011	11th	Best Serial Drama (Jury)	Ekta Kapoor, Shobha Kapoor	Won	
2011	11th	Best Director (Jury)	Ravindra Gautam	Won	
2011	11th	Best Actor (Jury)	Ram Kapoor	Won	
2011	11th	Best Actress (Jury)	Sakshi Tanwar	Won	
2011	11th	Best Writer (Jury)	Jayesh D. Patil; Dilip Jha; Archita Biswas Jha	Nominated	
2011	11th	Best Dialogues Drama(Jury)	Shirish Latkar	Nominated	
2011	11th	Best Costumes Drama (Jury)	Nim Sood	Nominated	
2011	11th	Best Audiography Drama (Jury)	Dilip Chaturvedi	Nominated	
2011	11th	ITA Award For Best Actor Drama (Popular)	Ram Kapoor	Nominated	
2011	11th	ITA Award For Best Actress Drama (Popular)	Sakshi Tanwar	Nominated	
2011	11th	ITA Award For Best Serial Drama (Popular)	Bade Achhe Lagte Hain	Nominated	
2012	12th	ITA Award For Best Actor Drama (Jury)	Ram Kapoor	Won	
2012	12th	Most Promising Child Star	Amrita Mukherjee	Won	
2012	12th	Best Serial Drama (Jury)	Bade Achhe Lagte Hain	Nominated	
2012	12th	Best Art Direction	Saurabh Kaushik	Nominated	
2012	12th	Best Singer	Shreya Ghoshal; Trijayh Dey	Nominated	
2012	12th	Best Actor Drama (Popular)	Ram Kapoor	Nominated	
2012	12th	Best Actress Drama (Popular)	Sakshi Tanwar	Nominated	
2012	12th	Best Serial Drama (Popular)	Ekta Kapoor, Shobha Kapoor	Nominated	

== Indian Telly Awards ==
The Indian Telly Awards are annual honours presented by the PR firm Indian Television. The Awards are given in several categories such as best program or series in a specific genre, best television channel in a particular category, most popular actors and awards for technical roles such as writers and directors.

Year	Category	Recipient	Result	Citation
2012	Best Screenplay Writer (Jury)	Dilip Jha; Archita Biswas Jha; Nehum Rawat	Won	
2012	Best Story Writer(Jury)	Jayesh D. Patil	Won	
2012	Best Actress In A Lead Role(Jury)	Sakshi Tanwar	Won	
2012	Best Drama Series(Jury)	Ekta Kapoor	Won	
2012	Best Actor In A Lead Role	Ram Kapoor	Won	
2012	Best Stylist(Jury)	Nim Sood	Nominated	
2012	Best Title Singer For A TV Show(Jury)	Shreya Ghoshal	Nominated	
2012	Best Actor In A Supporting Role(Jury)	Jai Kalra	Nominated	
2012	Best Actor In A Lead Role(Jury)	Ram Kapoor	Nominated	
2012	Best Actress In A Negative Role	Eva Grover	Nominated	
2012	Best Television Personality	Ram Kapoor	Nominated	
2012	Best Actress In A Lead Role	Sakshi Tanwar	Nominated	
2012	Best On Screen TV Couple	Ram Kapoor; Sakshi Tanwar	Nominated	
2012	Best Daily Serial	Bade Achhe Lagte Hain	Nominated	
2012	Best Drama Series	Bade Achhe Lagte Hain	Nominated	
2013	Best Child Artiste (Female)	Amrita Mukherjee	Won	
2013	Best Actor in Negative Role	Mahesh Shetty	Won	
2013	Best Drama Series (Jury)	Ekta Kapoor	Won	
2013	Best Actress in Supporting Role	Tarana Raja Kapoor	Nominated	

== Lions Gold Awards ==
The Lions Gold Awards are presented by Lions Club of Mumbai.

Year	Event	Category	Recipient	Result	Citation
2012	18th	Favorite TV Actor in Negative Role	Mahesh Shetty	Won	
2012	18th	Favorite TV Actress	Sakshi Tanwar	Won	
2012	18th	Favorite TV Actor	Ram Kapoor	Won	
2013	19th	Favorite TV Child Actor	Amrita Mukherjee	Won	
2013	19th	Favorite TV Actress in Supporting Role	Renuka Israni	Won	
2013	19th	Favorite TV Actor in Supporting Role	Sameer Kochhar	Won	
2013	19th	Favorite TV Actress	Sakshi Tanwar	Won	
2013	19th	Favorite TV Actor	Ram Kapoor	Won	
2013	19th	Favorite TV Show (Fiction)	Ekta Kapoor, Shobha Kapoor	Won	

== People's Choice Awards ==
The People's Choice Awards India are honours presented excellence in the television industry, Bollywood, music and sports. The awards are given in several other categories also.

Year	Category	Recipient	Result	Citation
2012	Favourite TV Drama Actor	Ram Kapoor	Nominated	
2012	Favourite TV Drama Actress	Sakshi Tanwar	Won	
2012	Favorite Ensemble Cast	Bade Achhe Lagte Hain	Won	
2012	Favorite Television Drama	Bade Achhe Lagte Hain	Won	

== Star Guild Awards ==
The Star Guild Awards (Also known as Apsara Film & Television Producer's Guild Awards) are presented annually by members of the Apsara Producers Guild to honour excellence in film and television.

Year	Category	Recipient	Result	Citation
2012	Best Drama Series (Fiction)	Bade Achhe Lagte Hain	Won	
2012	Best Drama Director(Fiction)	Sangeeta Rao	Won	
2012	Apsara Award For Best Actress In A Drama Series	Sakshi Tanwar	Won	
2012	Apsara Award For Best Actor In A Drama Series	Ram Kapoor	Nominated	
2012	Best Writer	Jayesh D. Patil	Nominated	
2012	Best Ensemble Cast	Bade Achhe Lagte Hain	Nominated	
2013	Best Ongoing Drama Series (Fiction)	Bade Achhe Lagte Hain	Won	
2013	Apsara Award For Best Actor In A Drama Series	Ram Kapoor	Won	
2013	Apsara Award For Best Actress In A Drama Series	Sakshi Tanwar	Won	
2013	Best Story	Sonali Jaffer	Won	
2013	Best Screenplay	Harneet Singh	Won	
2013	Best Drama Director(Fiction)	Sangeeta Rao	Nominated	
2013	Best Drama Series (Fiction)	Bade Achhe Lagte Hain	Nominated	
2013	Best Ensemble	Bade Achhe Lagte Hain	Nominated	
