= 11th Indian Telly Awards =

- Awarded for: Achievements in Television
- Date: 31 May 2012
- Site: Mumbai
- Hosted by: Main Host(s): Ram Kapoor; Ronit Roy; Co Host(s): Manish Paul; Roshni Chopra
- Organized by: Indiantelevision.com

Highlights
- Best Picture: Popular-Diya Aur Baati Hum; Jury-Bade Achhe Lagte Hain
- Best Actor: Ram Kapoor & Sameer Soni (Bade Achhe Lagte Hain) & Parichay
- Best Actress: Popular-Giaa Manek; Jury-Sakshi Tanwar; Popular-(Saath Nibhaana Saathiya); Jury-(Bade Achhe Lagte Hain)
- Most awards: Bade Achhe Lagte Hain(5)
- Most nominations: Bade Achhe Lagte Hain (15)

Television coverage
- Channel: Colors TV
- Network: colors
- Duration: 3 hours (approx.)
- Ratings: 2.41

The 2012 Indian Telly Awards, officially the 11th Indian Telly Awards ceremony, presented by the Indiantelevision.com honouring Indian television shows of 2011 took place on 31 May 2012 in Mumbai. The ceremony was televised in India and internationally on Colors TV. Actors Ram Kapoor and Ronit Roy hosted the ceremony for the first time. The ceremony was co-hosted by Manish Paul & Roshni Chopra. The Telly Award Blue Carpet was hosted by Mona Singh & Manish Paul

== List of winners ==
Best Actor	Best Actress
Ram Kapoor as Ram Kapoor (Bade Achhe Lagte Hain); Samir Soni as Kunal Chopra (Parichay – Nayee Zindagi Kay Sapno Ka); Gurmeet Chaudhary as Maan Singh Khurana (Geet – Hui Sabse Parayi); Hiten Tejwani as Manav Damodar Deshmukh (Pavitra Rishta); Anas Rashid as Sooraj Arun Rathi (Diya Aur Baati Hum)	Giaa Manek as Gopi Modi (Saath Nibhaana Saathiya); Sakshi Tanwar as Priya Ram Kapoor (Bade Achhe Lagte Hain); Shweta Tiwari as Sweety Ahluwalia (Parvarrish); Ankita Lokhande as Archana Deshmukh (Pavitra Rishta); Pratyusha Banerjee as Anandi Singh (Balika Vadhu)
Best Actor (Jury)	Best Actress (Jury)
Manish Wadhwa as Chanakya (Chandragupta Maurya); Jay Soni as Ishaan Kashyap (Sasural Genda Phool); Ram Kapoor as Ram Kapoor (Bade Achhe Lagte Hain); Mohnish Behl as Dr. Ashutosh (Kuch Toh Log Kahenge); Narendra Jha as Hari Om Bappaji (Havan)	Sakshi Tanwar as Priya Ram Kapoor (Bade Achhe Lagte Hain); Ragini Khanna as Suhana Kashyap (Sasural Genda Phool); Shweta Tiwari as Sweety Ahluwalia (Parvarrish); Kritika Kamra as Arohi (Kuch Toh Log Kahenge)
Best Comic Actor	Best Comic Actress
Dilip Joshi as Jethalal Gada (Taarak Mehta Ka Ooltah Chashmah); Atul Parchure as Bhavesh Vasavada (R K Laxman Ki Duniya); Paresh Ganatra as Gautak (Chidiya Ghar); Abbas Khan as Eji Pandey (Lapataganj); Deven Bhojani as Suhas Tendulkar (Mrs. Tendulkar)	Kavita Kaushik as Inspector Chautala (FIR); Vandana Pathak as Bakula Vasavada (R K Laxman Ki Duniya); Disha Vakani as Daya Gada (Taarak Mehta Ka Ooltah Chashmah); Sucheta Khanna as Indumati (Lapataganj); Smita Singh as Sunaina Sharma (Hitler Didi)
Best Supporting Actor	Best Supporting Actress
Anup Soni as Bhairon Singh (Balika Vadhu); Jai Kalra as Vikram Shergill (Bade Achhe Lagte Hain); Ram Kapoor as Ram Kapoor (Bade Achhe Lagte Hain); Gaurav Chopra as Raghuvendra Rathore (Uttaran); Vivek Mushran as Lucky Singh Ahluwalia (Parvarrish)	Rupal Patel as Kokila Parag Modi (Saath Nibhaana Saathiya); Anjum Farooki as Gauri Singh (Balika Vadhu; Neelu Vaghela as Santosh Rathi/Bhabo (Diya Aur Baati Hum); Supriya Pilgaonkar as Shailaja Kashyap (Sasural Genda Phool); [Aarti Singh as Seema Chopra(Parichay – Nayee Zindagi Kay Sapno Ka)
Best Negative Actor	Best Negative Actress
Karanvir Bohra as Viraj Dobriyal (Dil Se Di Dua... Saubhagyavati Bhava?); Vikramjeet Virk as Gajnavi (Shobha Somnath Ki); Aman Verma as Bhanu Pratap (Na Aana Is Des Laado); Anupam Shyam as Sajjan Singh (Mann Kee Awaaz Pratigya); Abhaas Mehta as Shyam Jha (Iss Pyaar Ko Kya Naam Doon?)	Kanika Maheshwari as Meenakshi Rathi (Diya Aur Baati Hum); Shivshakti Sachdev as Pinky Raj (Afsar Bitiya); Usha Nadkarni as Savita Damodar Deshmukh (Pavitra Rishta); Eva Grover as Niharika Kapoor (Bade Achhe Lagte Hain); Mona Vasu as Richa Thakral (Parichay – Nayee Zindagi Kay Sapno Ka)
Best Television Personality (Male)	Best Television Personality (Female)
Ronit Roy as Advocate K.D.Pathak (Adaalat); Ram Kapoor as Ram Kapoor (Bade Achhe Lagte Hain); Barun Sobti as Arnav Raizada (Iss Pyaar Ko Kya Naam Doon?)	Ankita Lokhande as Archana Deshmukh (Pavitra Rishta); Pratyusha Banerjee as Anandi Singh (Balika Vadhu); Giaa Manek as Gopi Modi (Saath Nibhana Saathiya)
Best Fresh New Face (Male)	Best Fresh New Face (Female)
Kushal Tandon as Virat Vadhera (Ek Hazaaron Mein Meri Behna Hai); Gaurav S Bajaj as Daksh Patwardhan (Sapnon Se Bhare Naina); Ashish Kapoor as Rajkumar Udayveer (Dekha Ek Khwab); Sumit Vats as Rishi Kumar (Hitler Didi); Sujey Reu as Anukalp Gandhi (Ram Milaayi Jodi)	Aakanksha Singh as Megha Vyas (Na Bole Tum Na Maine Kuch Kaha); Mitali Nag as Krishna Raj (Afsar Bitiya); Aishwarya Sakhuja as Tanya Chaturvedi/Toasty (Saas Bina Sasural); Soumya Seth as Navya Bajpai (Navya); Deepika Singh as Sandhya Sooraj Rathi (Diya Aur Baati Hum); Keerti Nagpure as Siddhi Chopra (Parichay – Nayee Zindagi Kay Sapno Ka)
Best Child Artiste (Male)	Best Child Artiste (Female)
Raj Mange as Hanuman (Jai Jai Jai Bajrang Bali); Aryan Sharma as Chotu (Diya Aur Baati Hum); Paras Arora as Shivaji Bhosle (Veer Shivaji); Bhavya Gandhi as Tipendra Gada/Tapu (Taarak Mehta Ka Ooltah Chashmah); Rushiraj Pawar as Chandragupt Maurya (Chandragupta Maurya)	Aanchal Munjal as Ravee Ahuja (Parvarrish); Sparsh Khanchandani as Rashi Ahuja (Parvarrish); Jannat Zubair Rehmani as Young Phulwa (Phulwa); Khusali Hirani as Mahika (Haar Jeet); Palak Jain as Saibai Bhosle (Veer Shivaji)
Best Anchor	Best Onscreen Couple
Amitabh Bachchan (Kaun Banega Crorepati (Season 5)); Karan Johar (Koffee with Karan); Jay Bhanushali & Saumya Tandon (Dance India Dance (seasonx 3)); Preity Zinta (Guinness World Records – Ab India Todega); Ayushmann Khurrana (Just Dance)	Barun Sobti & Sanaya Irani (Iss Pyaar Ko Kya Naam Doon?); Samir Soni & Keerti Nagpure (Parichay – Nayee Zindagi Kay Sapno Ka); Ram Kapoor & Sakshi Tanwar (Bade Achhe Lagte Hain); Sushant Singh Rajput & Ankita Lokhande (Pavitra Rishta); Anas Rashid & Deepika Singh (Diya Aur Baati Hum); Gurmeet Chaudhary & Drashti Dhami (Geet – Hui Sabse Parayi)
Best Ensemble	Best Programme with Social Message
Parvarrish; Parichay – Nayee Zindagi Kay Sapno Ka; Saath Nibhana Saathiya; Sasural Genda Phool; Balika Vadhu	Afsar Bitiya; Parvarrish; Balika Vadhu; Diya Aur Baati Hum; Aap Ki Kachehri (Season 3)
Best Daily Serial	Best Weekly Serial
Diya Aur Baati Hum; Bade Achhe Lagte Hain; Pavitra Rishta; Saath Nibhana Saathiya; Dil Se Di Dua... Saubhagyavati Bhava?; Balika Vadhu	Adaalat; CID; Crime Patrol Dastak
Best Drama Series (Popular)	Best Drama Series (Jury)
Balika Vadhu; Bade Achhe Lagte Hain; Pavitra Rishta; Mann Kee Awaaz Pratigya; Yahaaan Main Ghar Ghar Kheli; Sasural Simar Ka	Bade Achhe Lagte Hain; Balika Vadhu; Diya Aur Baati Hum; Parvarrish; Parichay – Nayee Zindagi Kay Sapno Ka
Best Continuing Programme	Best Thriller Programme
Yeh Rishta Kya Kehlata Hai; Balika Vadhu; Pavitra Rishta; CID; Uttaran; Taarak Mehta Ka Ooltah Chashmah	CID; Crime Patrol Dastak; Adaalat; Chhal – Sheh Aur Maat

Categories	Recipient	Show	Channel
Best Kid's show	Bournvita Quiz Contest	Bournvita Quiz Contest	Colors TV
Best Sitcom	Neela Telefilms	Taarak Mehta Ka Ooltah Chashmah	SAB TV
Best Reality Show	Endemol	Bigg Boss (season 5)	Colors TV
Best Game show	BIG Synergy	Kaun Banega Crorepati (season 5)	Sony TV
Best Dancing Talent Show	Frames Productions	Dance India Dance (season 3)	Zee TV
Best Singing Talent Show	FremantleMedia	X Factor (India)	Sony TV
Best Comedy Talent Show	Optimystix Entertainment	Jubilee Comedy Circus	Sony TV
Best Mythological show	Contiloe Entertainment	Veer Shivaji	Colors TV
Best Judge panel	Dharmendra, Kiron Kher & Sonali Bendre	India's Got Talent (season 3)	Colors TV
Best Youth Show (Fiction)	Cinevistaas Limited	Dil Dosti Dance	Channel V
Best Youth Show (Non-Fiction)	MTV	MTV Roadies (season 8)	MTV
Best Televised Award Show	Cine Yug	Star Parivaar Awards	Star Plus
Best Televised Entertainment Show	Zee Entertainment	Sa Re Ga Ma Pa Li'l Champs 2011	Zee TV

== See also ==
- Indian Telly Awards
