= List of awards and nominations received by Sakshi Tanwar =

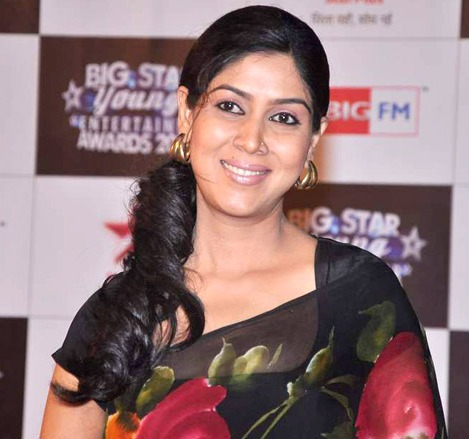
Sakshi at the BIG Star Entertainment Awards, 2012

Sakshi Tanwar is an Indian television actress, known as Parvati Agarwal of Kahaani Ghar Ghar Kii and Priya Sharma Kapoor of Bade Achhe Lagte Hain. Tanwar has won many awards mostly for Bade Achhe Lagte Hain.

== Indian Television Academy Awards ==
The Indian Television Academy Awards, also known as the (ITA Awards) is an annual event organised by the Indian Television Academy. The awards are presented in various categories, including popular programming (music, news, entertainment, sports, travel, lifestyle and fashion), best television channel in various categories, technical awards, and Best Performance awards.

Year	Category	Show	Character	Result	Ref.
2010	ITA Milestone Award	Kahaani Ghar Ghar Kii	Parvati Aggarwal	Won	
2011	Best Actress – Drama (Jury)	Bade Achhe Lagte Hain	Priya Kapoor	Won	

== Indian Telly Awards ==
The 'Indian Telly Awards' are annual honours presented by the company of Indian Television to persons and organisations in the television industry of India. The Awards are given in several categories such as best programme or series in a specific genre, best television channel in a particular category, most popular actors and awards for technical roles such as writers and directors.

Year	Category	Show	Character	Result	Ref.
2003	Best Actress in Lead Role	Kahaani Ghar Ghar Kii	Parvati Aggarwal	Won	
2012	Best Actress in a Lead Role (Jury)	Bade Achhe Lagte Hain	Priya Kapoor	Won	

== Apsara Awards ==
The Apsara Film & Television Producers Guild Awards are presented annually by members of the Apsara Producers Guild to honour Excellence in film and television.

Year	Category	Show	Character	Result	Ref.
2012	Best Actress in Drama Series	Bade Achhe Lagte Hain	Priya Kapoor	Won	
2013	Best Actress in Drama Series	Bade Achhe Lagte Hain	Priya Kapoor	Won	

== Gold Awards ==
The Zee Gold Awards (also known as the Gold Television or Boroplus Awards) are honours presented excellence in the television industry. The Awards are given in several categories.

Year	Category	Show	Character	Result	Ref.
2012	Best Actress (Critics)	Bade Achhe Lagte Hain	Priya Kapoor	Won	
2013	Best Actress (Critics)	Bade Achhe Lagte Hain	Priya Kapoor	Won	

== Big Star Entertainment Awards ==
Year	Category	Show	Character	Result	Ref.
2011	Best Actress in a Lead Role (Television)	Bade Achhe Lagte Hain	Priya Kapoor	Won	

== People's Choice Awards India ==
Year	Category	Show	Character	Result	Ref.
2012	Best Drama Actress	Bade Achhe Lagte Hain	Priya Kapoor	Won	

== Filmfare OTT Awards ==
Year	Category	Show	Character	Result	Ref.
2022	Best Actress Critics Choice (Drama Series)	Mai	Sheel	Won	
2022	Best Actress Drama Series	Mai	Sheel	Nominated	

== Star Parivaar Awards ==
Year	Title	Category	Result	Role	Ref.
2003	Kahaani Ghar Ghar Kii	Favourite Bhabhi	Won	Parvati	
2004	Kahaani Ghar Ghar Kii	Favourite Bhabhi	Won	Parvati	
2006	Kahaani Ghar Ghar Kii	Favourite Bhabhi	Won	Parvati	
2007	Kahaani Ghar Ghar Kii	Favourite Bhabhi	Won	Parvati	

== Other recognitions ==
- In 2013, her on-screen pairing with Ram Kapoor was voted India Today's Television's most popular onscreen couple.
- In April 2013, in a survey conducted by Ormax Media, Tanwar featured in Top 5 most trustworthy celebrities.
