= Indian Telly Award for Best Game Show =

Award

Indian Telly Award for Best game Show
- Awarded for: Best Game Show on Television
- Country: India
- Presented by: IndianTelevision.com
- First award: 2002
- Currently held by: Kaun Banega Crorepati - 2014
- Website: Indian Telly Awards

Indian Telly Awards for Best Game Show is an award given by IndianTelevision.com as a part of its annual Indian telly awards for TV serial recognize the Best Game Show on Indian Television.

== Winners ==
The following is the list of Winners of Telly Award for Best Game Show.

Year	TV show	Producer	Production House	Network
2002	Kaun Banega Crorepati (season 1)	Siddhartha Basu	BIG Synergy	Star Plus
2003	Mastermind India	Siddhartha Basu	BIG Synergy	Sony TV
2004	Not Awarded
2005	Kaun Banega Crorepati (season 2)	Siddhartha Basu	BIG Synergy	Star Plus
2006	Deal Ya No Deal		Endemol India	Sony TV
2007	Kaun Banega Crorepati (season 3)	Siddhartha Basu	BIG Synergy	Star Plus
2008	Dus Ka Dum (season 1)	Siddhartha Basu	BIG Synergy	Sony TV
2009	Dus Ka Dum (season 2)	Siddhartha Basu	BIG Synergy	Sony TV
2010	Dus Ka Dum (season 2)	Siddhartha Basu	BIG Synergy	Sony TV
2012	Kaun Banega Crorepati (season 5)	Siddhartha Basu	BIG Synergy	Sony TV
2013	Kaun Banega Crorepati (season 6)	Siddhartha Basu	BIG Synergy	Sony TV
2014	Kaun Banega Crorepati (season 7)	Siddhartha Basu	BIG Synergy	Sony TV

== See also ==
- Indian Telly Awards
- 11th Indian Telly Awards
- 12th Indian Telly Awards
