= Anil Wanvari =

Indian media entrepreneur (born 1963)

- Born: 1963 (age 61–62); India
- Occupations: CEO; Journalist; Marketer
- Years active: ~ 1988-present

Anil NM Wanvari (born 1963) is an Indian media entrepreneur who is the founder, CEO, and editor-in-chief of the Indiantelevision.com group, which he established in 1999. He is a journalist and specialist covering Indian advertising, marketing, cable TV, satellite TV, terrestrial television, and over-the-top (OTT) media service ecosystems.

Wanvari has also been involved in creating properties such as The Indian Telly Awards and The NT Awards. He is a member of the New York-based International Academy of Television Arts & Sciences.

== Early life and education ==
Anil NM Wanvari was born the third of four sons of Moolchand Thakurdas Wanvari (1932-2020), an Indian businessman who migrated to India during the partition, and Neelam Wanvari (1938–2009), a homemaker. He completed his BSc in Botany from Mumbai's Jai Hind College where he received the highest marks in his class in 1983–84. He then received his master's degree in cytogenetics and plant breeding from Bombay University's Ramnarain Ruia College in 1987. Following his master's degree, Wanvari earned a diploma in journalism and mass communications from Mumbai's Xavier Institute of Communications in 1988.

== Career ==
Wanvari initially worked for publications such as the Western India Automobile Association's (WIAA's) Motoring magazine. This was followed by a six-year period at BusinessWorld magazine, where he rose from sub-editor to Assistant Editor in five years. He wrote on topics including entrepreneurship, technology, banking and finance, stock markets, media, advertising, marketing, brands, and management practices.

After six years with BusinessWorld, Wanvari began writing columns for Financial Express, on subjects such as internet, telecommunications, technology, media, advertising, and marketing. He also wrote a column on the media business for Business Standard for a couple of years.
