= Amrita Mukherjee =

Indian television child actor

- Occupation: Actress
- Years active: 2012—present
- Notable work: Bade Achhe Lagte Hain
- Awards: Indian Television Academy Awards; Indian Telly Awards; Lions Gold Awards; Boroplus Gold Awards

Amrita Mukherjee is an Indian television actress. She is known for her role of Peehu Ram Kapoor (sometimes spelled Pihu) in the Sony TV soap opera Bade Achhe Lagte Hain.

== Television ==
- 2012—2013 - Bade Achhe Lagte Hain as Pihu / Peehu Ram Kapoor
- 2013 - Kaun Banega Crorepati with Ram Kapoor and Sakshi Tanwar - as their daughter - Pihu / Peehu Ram Kapoor
- 2013 - Comedy Circus Ke Mahabali as herself - Guest performer
- 2014 - Comedy Nights with Kapil as herself - special appearance
- 2015 - Stories by Rabindranath Tagore as mini in Kabuliwala

== Awards ==
- The 12th Indian Television Academy Awards, 2012, Most Promising Child Star as Pihu / Peehu Ram Kapoor
- The 12th Indian Telly Awards, 2013, Most Popular Child Artiste - Female as Pihu / Peehu Ram Kapoor
- Lions Gold Awards, 2013, Most Popular Child Actor on Television as Pihu / Peehu Ram Kapoor
- 6th Boroplus Gold Awards, 2013, Most Popular Child Artist as Pihu / Peehu Ram Kapoor
