= Kattumarakaran =

- Theatrical release poster
- Directed by: P. Vasu
- Written by: P. Vasu
- Produced by: A. G. Subramaniam
- Starring: Prabhu; Anjali; Sanghavi
- Cinematography: Ashok Kumar
- Edited by: P. Mohanraj
- Music by: Ilaiyaraaja (songs); Deva (score)
- Production company: A. G. S. Movies
- Release date: 15 January 1995
- Running time: 150 minutes
- Country: India
- Language: Tamil

Kattumarakaran (transl. The kattumaram man) is a 1995 Indian Tamil language romantic drama film written and directed by P. Vasu. The film stars Prabhu, newcomer Eva Grover (credited as Anjali) and Sanghavi. The songs was composed by Ilaiyaraaja and background score was composed by Deva. The film was released on 15 January 1995, and failed at the box office.

== Plot ==
Muthazhagu is a fisherman who works in the catamaran of his boss. One day, he saves Vaidehi, a mysterious girl who had attempted suicide. She refuses to identify herself and he keeps her safe as they slowly fall in love.

It later turns out that she is the daughter of a millionaire and belongs to royalty who had become vexed with all the rules, norms, pomp and richness. Will they get married is the question resolved in the end.

== Cast ==
- Prabhu as Muthazhagu
- Anjali as Vaidehi
- Sanghavi
- Tej Sapru as Raja Rajamanickam
- Anandaraj as Muthazhagu's boss
- Srividya as Rajalakshmi
- Nizhalgal Ravi as Muthazhagu's brother-in-law
- M. N. Nambiar as Vaidehi's grandfather
- Mohan V. Ram as Senthilnathan
- Kazan Khan as Johnny
- Sivachandran as Vijay Raghavan
- Senthil
- R. S. Shivaji
- Thyagu
- Vengal Rao as Cattle herder

== Production ==
Tabu was initially chosen as lead actress during the film's launch; however she was later replaced by newcomer Eva Grover. She was rechristened Anjali for the film. The film's first day shoot was held at AVM Studios and the distribution rights were sold on that day itself.

== Soundtrack ==
The songs were composed by Ilaiyaraaja, with lyrics written by Vaali. Due to differences of opinion between Ilaiyaraaja and producer Subramaniam over the audio rights, Deva composed the background score instead.

Song	Singer(s)	Duration
"Akkarai Illaa"	Mano	5:12
"Banana Banana"	Mano	4:53
"Chinna Poove"	Mano, K. S. Chithra	5:18
"Katthum Kadal"	Mano, S. Janaki	5:30
"Kekkuthadi"	Mano, S. Janaki	5:33
"Vetri Vetri"	S. P. Balasubrahmanyam, K. S. Chithra	5:34
