= Ram Kapoor =

Indian actor (born 1973)

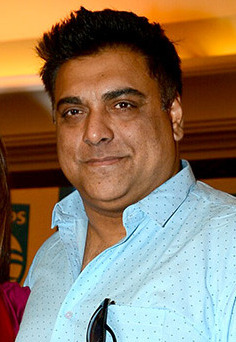
- Kapoor in 2017
- Born: 1 September 1973 (age 53); Jalandhar, Punjab, India
- Other name: Jai
- Education: Kodaikanal International School; Sherwood College, Nainital
- Occupation: Actor
- Years active: 1998–present
- Known for: Manshaa; Kasamh Se; Bade Achhe Lagte Hain; Dil Ki Baatein Dil Hi Jaane; Humshakals
- Spouse: Gautami Kapoor (m. 2003)
- Children: 2

Ram Kapoor ([raːm kəpuːr]; born 1 September 1973) is an Indian actor who primarily works in Hindi-language films and television. One of the highest-paid television actors in India, he is known for portraying Jai Walia in Kasamh Se and Ram Kapoor in Bade Achhe Lagte Hain. He is a recipient of several awards including three ITA Awards and three Indian Telly Awards.

== Career ==
Kapoor made his onscreen debut with the television serial Nyaay (1999). He took up three more shows Heena (1998), Sangharsh (1999) and Kavita (2000).

In 2000, Kapoor acted in popular family drama Ghar Ek Mandir. Kapoor worked with Amir Raza Hussein once again in the play The Fifty Days of War – Kargil which ran for 10 days in New Delhi as a tribute to the heroes of the Kargil War. Kapoor played five characters.

In 2001, Kapoor acted in Rishtey, in the serial Kabhi Aaye Na Judaai and made a cameo appearance in Mira Nair's film Monsoon Wedding.

He went on to appear in films like Dhadkan (2003) and Awaz - Dil Se Dil Tak, followed by Hazaaron Khwaishein Aisi and Bali (2004), a telefilm in which he played Prithvi Singh. In 2005, Kapoor's was seen in films like Devaki, Kal: Yesterday and Tomorrow and Missed Call.

In 2006, he starred in the show Kasamh Se in the role of Jai Udai Walia. Kapoor was then seen in the soap opera Basera and participated in two reality shows: Jhalak Dikhhla Jaa as a participant and Rakhi Ka Swayamwar as the host.

Kapoor appeared in minor roles in two films in 2010. The first was the commercially successful Karthik Calling Karthik, with Kapoor playing the role of Kamath Sir. The second, Udaan, was a critically acclaimed and award-winning film directed by Vikrmaditya Motwane and was produced by Anurag Kashyap.

In 2011, he starred on the TV show Bade Achhe Lagte Hain and played the male protagonist Ram Amarnath Kapoor. He appeared in Bollywood movies Agent Vinod (2012), Student of the Year (2012) and Humshakals (2014).

== Personal life ==
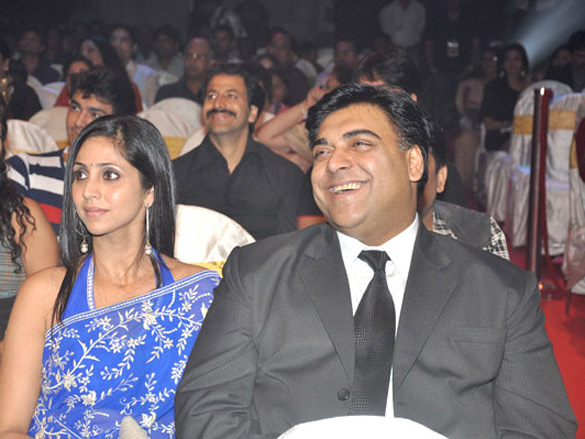
Kapoor with his wife, Gautami Kapoor

Kapoor met actress Gautami Gadgil in 2000 on the set of Ghar Ek Mandir. After dating for two years, the couple got married on 14 February 2003. They are parents to two children. He is an ethnic Punjabi Hindu.

== Media image ==
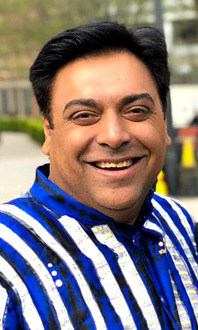
Kapoor in 2018

Kapoor established himself among the leading and highest-paid actors of Hindi television. In 2014, he was placed sixth in Rediff.com's "Top Television Actors" list.

== Filmography ==
=== Television and Web Series ===
Year	Title	Role	Notes
1998	Heena	Dr. Amir	Debut on Television
1999	Sangharsh	Pitambar Tahilyani	
1999	Nyaay	Gaurav Makija	
2000	Kavita	Rishi Grover	
2000–2001	Ghar Ek Mandir	Advocate Rahul: Gopal and Gayatri's younger son; Rajesh and Prem's younger brother; Archana's elder brother; Aanchal's husband; Mala's ex–boyfriend	
2001	Kabhi Aaye Na Judaai	Rajeshwar Agnihotri	
2001	Rishtey	Sujoy Chaudary	Episodic role
2002	Kehta Hai Dil	Jai Singh	
2003	Awaz - Dil Se Dil Tak	ACP Vishal Kapoor / DCP Vishal Kapoor	
2003	Dhadkan	Dr. Rajeev Agarwal, Psychologist	
2004	Bali	Prithvi Singh	
2004	Manshaa	Vinay Kishore Khanna, Kishore and Asha's son; Vijay's brother; Manshaa's husband	Dead
2005	Kyunki Saas Bhi Kabhi Bahu Thi	Shadab	
2007–2008	Kyunki Saas Bhi Kabhi Bahu Thi	Jas Thakral	Triple role (Note: Ram Kapoor plays in a triple role in this televisions.)
2007–2008	Kyunki Saas Bhi Kabhi Bahu Thi	Ram Kapoor	Cameo role
2006	Kasamh Se	Walia; Udai's father and Jai, Jigyasa and Nachiket's grandfather (photo)	Photo role
2006	Kasamh Se	Udai Walia; Walia's son; Jai, Jigyasa and Nachiket's father (photo)	Triple role
2006–2009	Kasamh Se	Jai Walia; Udai's son; Walia's grandson; Jigyasa's brother; Nachiket's half-brother; A Ruthless Businessman; Bani's husband; Meera's ex-husband; Veer, Krishna, Atharva, Ganga; Jr. Krishan, Jr. Atharva and Vicky's father	
2006	Jeena Isi Ka Naam Hai	Ram Kapoor (Himself)	Along with Gautami Kapoor, Prachi Desai, Ashwini Kalsekar, Kishwer Merchant, Naman Shaw, Pawan Shankar and Manoj Kumar
2007	Koffee with Karan	Ram Kapoor (Himself)	Along with Hiten Tejwani, Ronit Roy, Ekta Kapoor. Season 2; Episode 16
2009	Jhalak Dikhhla Jaa	Ram Kapoor (Himself)	Contestant; Eliminated 5th; Season 9
2009	Rakhi Ka Swayamwar	Ram Kapoor (Himself)	Host
2009	Basera	Keshubhai Sanghvi	
2010	Swayamwar 2 – Rahul Dhulaniya Lejaayenge	Ram Kapoor (Himself)	Host
2011–2014	Bade Achhe Lagte Hain	Ram Amarnath Kapoor; A Ruthless Businessman; Amarnath and Krishna's son; Dadi's grandson; Vikram, Neha and Rajat's friend; Sudhir and Shipra's son-in-law; Priya's husband; Kartik and Ayesha's brother-in-law; Pihu (Peehu), Myra and Pari's father	
2011	Kaun Banega Crorepati	Ram Kapoor (Himself)	Season 5. Along with Sakshi Tanwar
2012	Kya Huaa Tera Vaada	Ram Amarnath Kapoor; A Ruthless Businessman; Amarnath and Krishna's son; Dadi's grandson; Vikram, Neha and Rajat's friend; Sudhir and Shipra's son-in-law; Priya's husband; Kartik and Ayesha's brother-in-law; Pihu (Peehu), Myra and Pari's father	Guest Appearance
2012	Kahani Comedy Circus Ki	Ram Kapoor (Himself). Guest Host along with Shruti Seth; Holi Special Episode	Guest Appearance
2012	Kaun Banega Crorepati	Ram Kapoor (Himself)	Season 6. Along with Sakshi Tanwar and Amrita Mukherjee
2013	Sanskaar – Dharohar Apnon Ki	Parmeshwar Patel Kapoor / Paddy	Guest Appearance
2013	Welcome- Bazzi mehman nawazi ki	Ram Kapoor (Himself)	Host
2014	Comedy Nights with Kapil	Himself. Promotion for Hindi Film Humshakals	Episode No. 84 and 85. Along with Sajid Khan, Saif Ali Khan, Riteish Deshmukh, Esha Gupta and Tamannaah Bhatia
2015	Dil Ki Baatein Dil Hi Jaane	Ram Ahuja; Anandita's widower; Disha and Aarav's father; Ayan's client	
2016	Tamanna	Avinash Arora	
2017–2019	Karrle Tu Bhi Mohabbat	Karan "KK" Khanna; A superstar, Radhika's ex-husband; Tipsy's husband; Trisha and Priya's biological's father	Debut Webseries
2017	Tyohaar Ki Thaali	Ram Kapoor (Himself)	Episode 9. Along with Sakshi Tanwar
2018	10 Ka Dum	Ram Kapoor (Himself)	Along with Ronit Roy, Aayush Sharma and Warina Hussain
2018	Zindagi Ki Crossroads	Ram Kapoor (Himself)	Host
2018	Comedy High School	Various	
2020	Abhay 2	Kidnapper, Psycho killer	Dead; bomb blast
2020	A Suitable Boy	Mahesh Kapoor (State Minister of Revenue), Maan's father	
2022	Human	Pratap Munjal	
2022	Masaba Masaba	Shekhar Mirza	
2023	Jubilee	Shamsher Singh Walia	
2024	Khalbali Records	Manvender Rai Singh	
2025	Mistry	Armaan Dadabhoy Mistry	
2026	Lock Upp 2: Sach Ya Saza	Contestant	Eliminated; Fifth place
2026	Hunkkaar	Govind Ved Prakash, Baapji's defense lawyer	

=== Films ===
Key
†	Denotes films that have not yet been released

Year	Title	Role	Notes
2001	Monsoon Wedding	Shelly	Debut Film
2003	Hazaaron Khwaishein Aisi	Arun Mehta	
2005	Kal: Yesterday and Tomorrow	Rohan Sehgal	
2005	Missed Call	Vinay Murthi	
2005	Behind the Mirror	Grandfather	
2005	Devaki	Rahul	
2008	Golmaal Returns	Jai Udai Walia	Cameo appearance
2010	Karthik Calling Karthik	Kamath Sir	
2010	Udaan	Jimmy Singh (Chhotu), Bhairav's younger brother and Rohan and Arjun's paternal uncle	
2011	Love U...Mr. Kalakaar!	Deshraj Diwan, Ritu's father	
2012	Ek Main Aur Ekk Tu	Mr. D.K. Bulani; a friend of Rahul's father, who tries to help Rahul overcome his low-esteem	
2012	Agent Vinod	Abu Sayed Nazer	
2012	Student of the Year	Ashok Nanda; Gayatri's husband; Ro's father	
2013	Mai	Subhash Joshi, Mai's son-in-law, Madhu's husband; Charu's father	
2013	Mere Dad Ki Maruti	Tej Khullar, Sameer and Tanvi's father	
2014	Shaadi Ke Side Effects	Ranveer Malhotra; Aanchal's husband	
2014	Humshakals	Mamaji Kunwar Amar Nath Singh ("KANS"), Johnny and Balbir Gupta	Triple role (Note: Ram Kapoor plays in a triple role in this films.)
2014	Lakshmi	Avinash, Lakshmi's Advocate	
2014	Words with Gods	Om	Segment" "God Room"
2015	Kuch Kuch Locha Hai	Praveen "PP" Patel; Kokila's husband; Jigar's father	
2016	Baar Baar Dekho	Vinod Kapoor; Divya's father	
2016	Rough Book	Harshvardhan Kapur	
2016	Santa Banta Pvt Ltd	Sonu Sultan	
2017	Qaidi Band	Naveen Vachani	
2018	Loveyatri	Rasik Desai; Susu's uncle (Mamaji)	
2020	Thappad	Advocate Pramod Gujral; Vikram's lawyer	
2020	Bahut Hua Samman	Lovely Singh	
2021	The Big Bull	Ashok Mirchandani; Hemant's lawyer	Based on Ram Jethmalani
2023	Neeyat	Ashish Kapoor aka AK	Dead
2024	Yudhra	Rehman Siddiqui; Nikhat's father and Yudhra's mentor	
2025	Jolly LLB 3	Advocate Vikram Ray Chaudhary	
2026	Udta Teer	A.Q. Niyazi	

== Awards ==
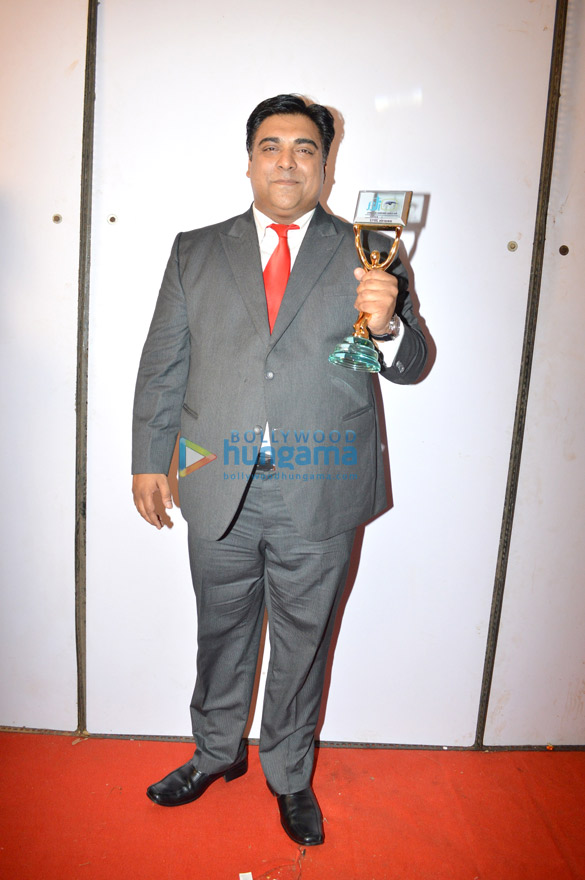
Ram Kapoor at 12th Indian Television Academy Awards

Year	Award	Category	For the show
2006	Indian Television Academy Awards	Best Actor(Jury)	Kasamh Se
2006	Indian Telly Awards	Best Actor (Popular)	Kasamh Se
2006	Indian Telly Awards	Best Onscreen Couple (Shared with Prachi Desai)	Kasamh Se
2011	Indian Television Academy Awards	Best Actor(Jury)	Bade Achhe Lagte Hain
2012	Indian Television Academy Awards	Best Actor(Jury)	Bade Achhe Lagte Hain
2012	Indian Telly Awards	Best Actor (Popular)	Bade Achhe Lagte Hain
2012	5th Boroplus Gold Awards	Best Actor in a Lead Role	Bade Achhe Lagte Hain
2014	Ghanta Awards	Worst Picture in the History of Bollywood and decade and Worse Actor (Shared with Riteish Deshmukh and Saif Ali Khan)	Humshakals
2014	Golden Kela Awards	Nominated for Worst Picture in the History of Bollywood and decade and Worse Actor	Humshakals

== See also ==
- List of Indian television actors
- List of Indian film actors
- List of accolades received by Bade Achhe Lagte Hain
