= Nyaydaata =

- Directed by: Vicky Ranawat
- Written by: Sanjay Niranjan
- Produced by: Saroj Chaudhary; Sanjay Niranjan
- Starring: Dharmendra; Jaya Prada; Asrani; Tinnu Anand; Harish Patel; Mukesh Rishi
- Narrated by: Sanjay Niranjan
- Cinematography: S.pappu
- Edited by: D.N Malik
- Music by: Shayam Surender
- Distributed by: Hallmark Studio
- Release date: 18 June 1999
- Running time: 130 minutes
- Country: India
- Language: Hindi
- Budget: 4cr
- Box office: 3cr

Nyaydaata is a 1999 Indian Hindi-language film starring Dharmendra, Jaya Prada, Harish Kumar & Ritu Shivpuri .

== Plot ==
Aravind and his friends embark on a trip to a forest but things take a turn when his friends go missing one by one. However, he gets into trouble when the police consider him as the prime suspect.

== Cast ==
- Dharmendra as D.C.P. Ram
- Jaya Prada as Aarti
- Asrani as Pandit Totaram
- Harish Kumar as Rahul
- Tinnu Anand as Inspector / Commissioner Khanna
- Harish Patel as Chikna
- Ritu Shivpuri as Ayesha Prasad
- Mukesh Rishi as Jabbar / Lankeshwar / Jwala Prasad
- Baby Gazala as Tina
- Eva Grover as Sarita
- Siddharth Dhawan as Sanjay

== Songs ==
1. "Bheegi Bheegi Hai Hawa" – Sonu Nigam, Alisha Chinoy
2. " Haule Haule" – Abhijeet
3. "Is Dil Ke Khayalon Ko" – Kavita Krishnamurthy, Vinod Rathod
4. "Kahte Hai Tumse Pyar Ho Gaya" – Kavita Krishnamurthy, Vinod Rathod
5. "Kisi Se Hogi Pehli" – Kavita Krishnamurthy
6. "Preet Ka Deep Jhagmagaya" – Sadhna Sargam
