= Smuggler (1996 film) =

1996 Indian Hindi-language film

- Promotional Poster
- Directed by: Ajay Kashyap
- Produced by: B. S. Shaad
- Starring: Dharmendra; Reena Roy; Ayub Khan; Eva Grover; Mukesh Khanna; Amrish Puri; Gopi Bhalla
- Music by: Bappi Lahiri
- Release date: 12 January 1996
- Country: India
- Language: Hindi

Smuggler is a 1996 Indian Hindi-language action crime film directed by Ajay Kashyap and produced by B. S. Shaad, starring Dharmendra, Reena Roy, Ayub Khan, Eva Grover, Mukesh Khanna, Amrish Puri.

== Cast ==
- Dharmendra as Ajit Singh
- Reena Roy as Usha Singh
- Ayub Khan as Inspector Vijay
- Eva Grover as Karina
- Mukesh Khanna as School Principal Liyaqat Khan
- Amrish Puri as Ratan / Big Man
- Ravinder Maan as Tara
- Gugu Gill as Deva
- Paramveer Singh as Aman
- Vishwajeet Pradhan as Shashank, Big Man's gang member
- Upasna Singh as Pooja
- Tiku Talsania as Policeman Narayan Mathur
- Gopi Bhalla as Barman

== Soundtrack ==
1. "Aaj Raat Chhodke" - Kumar Sanu
2. "Aaj Raat Chhodke" - Alka Yagnik
3. "Yeh Baarish Ka Paani" - Kumar Sanu, Alka Yagnik
4. "Ab Tum Se Chhup Chhup" - Udit Narayan, Kavita Krishnamurthy
5. "Bin Barsaat Ke" - Alka Yagnik, Ila Arun
6. "Kitna Haseen Hai Shabaab" - Alka Yagnik
7. "Kitna Haseen Hai Shabaab" - Alka Yagnik, Sudesh Bhosle
8. "Tan Tana Tan Ho Gaya" - Baba Sehgal, Sapna Mukherjee
