= Mahesh Shetty =

Indian film and television actor

- Born: 21 May 1984 (age 42)
- Occupation: Actor
- Years active: 2008–present
- Spouse: Aneesha Kapoor (m. 2011)
- Children: 1

Mahesh Shetty (born 21 May 1984) is an Indian actor who works in television serials and films. He made his television debut with Kis Desh Mein Hai Meraa Dil (2008) as Balraj Sahni. He is known for portraying Siddhant Kapoor in the Sony Entertainment Television show Bade Achhe Lagte Hain (2011) which was created and produced by Ekta Kapoor.

== Personal life ==
Shetty married to actress Aneesha Kapoor since 2011. The couple also have a daughter. He is a close friend to his Pavitra Rishta TV serial co-stars Sushant Singh Rajput and Ankita Lokhande.

== Filmography ==
=== Television ===
- Kis Desh Mein Hai Meraa Dil (2008–2010) as Nihaal Balraj Maan | Star Plus
- Ghar Ek Sapnaa (2009–2010) as Shlok Verma | Sahara One
- Pyaar Ka Bandhan (2009–2010) as Deva Daas / Milind | Sony TV
- Kesariya Balam Aavo Hamare Des (2009–2011) as Deep | Sahara One
- Parichay (2012–2013) as Abhay Diwan | Colors
- Pavitra Rishta (2010) as Jaywant Rane | Zee TV
- Bade Achhe Lagte Hain (2011–2014) as Siddhant Jayesh Karekar / Siddhant Amarnath Kapoor | Sony TV
- Kalash (2015–2017) as Saket Kapoor | Life OK
- SuperCops Vs Super Villains (2015) as Akash (Electro Man)| Life Ok
- Pyaar Ko Ho Jaane Do (2015–2016) as RAW Agent Jai Shergill | Sony Entertainment Television
- BOSS: Baap of Special Services (2019) as Chief | ALT Balaji
- Inside Edge (2021) as CBI Inspector, Ranganathan | Amazon Prime
- Aranyak(2021) as Omi Chawla | Netflix

=== Films ===
Year	Title	Role	Notes
2015	Balkadu	Jehangir Singh	Marathi film
2016	Banjo	Pakkaya	
2021	Bhuj: The Pride of India	Laxman Karnik	
2024	Fighter	Rajan "Unni" Unnithan	
2026	Uyir		

== Awards and nominations ==
Year	Award	Category	Character	Show	Result	Ref.
2012	Zee Gold Awards	Best Negative Actor (male)	Siddhant Kapoor	Bade Achhe Lagte Hain	Nominated	
2012	Lions Gold Awards	Best Television Actor in Negative Role	Siddhant Kapoor	Bade Achhe Lagte Hain	Won	
2013	Lions Gold Awards	Best Television Actor in Negative Role	Siddhant Kapoor	Bade Achhe Lagte Hain	Won	
2013	Zee Gold Awards	Best Negative Actor (male)	Siddhant Kapoor	Bade Achhe Lagte Hain	Won	
2013	Indian Telly Awards	Best Actor in a Negative Role	Siddhant Kapoor	Bade Achhe Lagte Hain	Won	
