= Humshakals =

2014 Indian film by Sajid Khan

- Theatrical release poster
- Directed by: Sajid Khan
- Written by: Sajid Khan
- Produced by: Vashu Bhagnani
- Starring: Saif Ali Khan; Riteish Deshmukh; Ram Kapoor; Tamannaah Bhatia; Esha Gupta; Bipasha Basu
- Cinematography: Ravi Yadav
- Edited by: Bunty Nagi
- Music by: Songs: Himesh Reshammiya; Background Score: Sandeep Shirodkar
- Production companies: Pooja Entertainment; Fox Star Studios
- Distributed by: Fox Star Studios
- Release date: 20 June 2014
- Running time: 158 minutes
- Country: India
- Language: Hindi
- Budget: ₹64 crore
- Box office: ₹105.28 crore

Humshakals (transl. Lookalikes) is a 2014 Indian Hindi-language comedy film directed by Sajid Khan and produced by Vashu Bhagnani. The film stars Saif Ali Khan, Riteish Deshmukh, Ram Kapoor, Tamannaah Bhatia, Esha Gupta and Bipasha Basu in the lead roles, with Satish Shah, Nawab Shah, Chunky Pandey and Darshan Jariwala in supporting roles. In the film, Khan, Deshmukh and Kapoor each portray three characters, totalling nine roles. The music for the film was composed by Himesh Reshammiya, with cinematography by Ravi Yadav and editing by Bunty Nagi. The film was shot extensively in various international locations and co-produced by Fox Star Studios.

Humshakals was released theatrically worldwide on 20 June 2014. The film grossed ₹86.60 crore at the box office against a budget of ₹64 crore. However, it was panned by critics and has been considered one of the worst films ever made. Several of the film's actors later regretted taking part.

== Plot ==
Ashok and Kumar are best friends. Shanaya and Mishti are their love interests. Ashok's father is a billionaire but has been in a coma for the last six years. During these years, Ashok's maternal uncle, Kunwar Amar Nath Singh (KANS Mama) has been in charge of his family property. Having enjoyed the money, Mamaji does not want to give up that money to Ashok, who is now old enough to take over. So the evil Mamaji teams up with an evil doctor and chemist, Dr. Khan, to get rid of Ashok (without murder) and keep control of his property. Dr. Khan gives Mamaji a medicine called MAD (Mind Altering Drug) which makes one act and speak like a dog for 24 hours. At first, Mamaji is reluctant and angry at Dr. Khan. But Mamaji then sees the medicine work on Dr. Khan’s two assistants (Chinku and Pinku) and agrees.

Towards this end, during a board meeting, Mamaji mixes the medicine in Ashok and Kumar's drinks, and they both start behaving like dogs. The men-behaving-like dogs are taken to a mental asylum for treatment. In the asylum, the lady doctor, Dr. Shivani, soon realizes the truth and promises to discharge them. But fate takes an even stranger twist because, in the same asylum, there are two identical lookalikes of Ashok and Kumar who are being treated in the 'B' ward. The lookalikes worked at an Indian food stall which was a front for Bijlani, a cocaine smuggler. One day Bijlani delivered a jar of cocaine to Ashok and Kumar mistaking that for flour used it for preparing parathas thereby making the customers go crazy. As a punishment, Bijlani gave them both severe electricity shocks thereby both losing their mental balance and were admitted to the asylum. These lookalikes are accidentally released instead of the real Ashok and Kumar. Shanaya and Mishti, who come to pick up their boyfriends from the asylum, take away the duplicates instead, without realizing anything. All of them go to Ashok's mansion. Here, Mamaji understands the whole mix-up and plans to use the duplicate Ashok to become the owner of the whole business empire.

By now, the true Ashok and Kumar also come to know of Mamaji's evil plan, but they are still stuck in the asylum. They are offered help by one of the ward boys, Cyrus, who takes them to a secret ward 'C' to meet 'Johnny' who is (by another coincidence or twist of fate) a look-alike of Mamaji. Johnny has a strange, dangerous habit of attacking people who sneeze in front of him.

Ashok and Kumar plan revenge against Mamaji with the help of his lookalike, Johnny. However, they get caught by the asylum's sadistic warden, Y.M. Raj (a supposedly funny play on "Yamraj," the god of death) before they can escape from the asylum. Y. M. Raj prepares to punish them, but he accidentally sneezes in front of them. Enraged, Johnny beats him black and blue, thus helping the three escape. On the day of the board meeting, the true Ashok and Kumar get ready to expose Mamaji, when Dr. Khan triggers the fire alarm. All the three mental patients escape the building. Now desperate, Ashok and Kumar bump into a dance bar owner named Balbir, who (by another coincidence) is a lookalike of Mamaji. Mamaji now does something innovative: he arranges another set of Ashok and Kumar with the help of plastic surgery from Dr. Khan's two assistants (Chinku and Pinku) who assume their identities. He takes the triplicate Ashok and Kumar to the House of Commons of the United Kingdom, where the fake (triplicate?) Ashok is to hand over all the business to him (Mamaji) in the presence of Prince Charles. However, the real Ashok and Kumar arrive, along with Balbir (who is Mamaji-III). To add to the confusion, the three mental patients also storm in to help the real Ashok and Kumar, creating panic among the eyewitnesses on seeing so many lookalikes together.

The film closes with Ashok's father coming out of his coma and recognizing the true Ashok and getting Mamaji arrested for his deeds.

== Cast ==
- Saif Ali Khan in a triple role as
  - Ashok Singhania; son of Mr. Singhania
  - Ashok 2
  - Chinku, Dr. Khan's assistant 1
- Riteish Deshmukh in a triple role as
  - Kumar, Ashok's friend
  - Kumar 2, Ashok 2's friend
  - Pinku, Dr. Khan's assistant 2
- Ram Kapoor in a triple role as
  - Kunwar Amarnath Singh (KANS Mamaji), Ashok Singhania's evil uncle
  - Johnny, a OCD patient who attacks when someone sneezes in front of him
  - Balbir Gupta, a bar owner
- Tamannaah Bhatia as Shanaya
- Esha Gupta as Dr. Shivani Gupta
- Bipasha Basu as Mishti
- Nawab Shah as Dr. Khan, Mamaji's evil sidekick
- Satish Shah as Y.M. Raj/Yamraj/Yamaraj/Yamaraja the institution warden
- Darshan Jariwala as Cyrus Patel
- Chunkey Pandey as Karan T. Bijlani
- Akash Khurana as Mr. Singhania; Ashok's father
- Suresh Menon as Subramaniyam, accountant in Ashok's (or his father's) office

== Production ==
=== Filming ===
The shooting of the film commenced on 24 September 2013 in London. The team shot in Mauritius for the final part of the film starting on 22 February 2014. Two songs and other sequences were shot at the La Plantation Resort & Spa, Le Méridien, Intercontinental Resort, Bagatelle Mall of Mauritius and the Northern Beaches, with Mauritian extras also having participated in the shooting.

After the film's release and subsequent poor critical response, Saif Ali Khan told the press that "The film didn't have a script as such, it was all there in Sajid's mind."

== Soundtrack ==
Humshakals

Soundtrack album by Himesh Reshammiya
- Released: 26 May 2014
- Recorded: 2014
- Venue: Mumbai
- Genre: Film soundtrack
- Length: 24:39
- Labels: Zee Music Company; Sony Music India
- Producers: Vashu Bhagnani; Himesh Reshammiya

Himesh Reshammiya chronology
The Xposé (2014)	Humshakals (2014)	Kick (2014)
External audio
- Audio Jukebox on YouTube

The soundtrack of Humshakals is composed by Himesh Reshammiya and lyrics are written by Mayur Puri, Sameer and Shabbir Ahmed. The first single of the film was "Caller Tune", by Neeraj Shridhar and Neeti Mohan. The soundtrack was released on 26 May 2014, where it was successful especially "Caller Tune" and "Piya Ke Bazaar Mein".

=== Track listing ===
Track Listing
No.	Title	Lyrics	Singer(s)	Length
1.	"Caller Tune"	Sameer	Neeraj Shridhar, Neeti Mohan	4:35
2.	"Piya Ke Bazaar Mein"	Shabbir Ahmed	Himesh Reshammiya, Shalmali Kholgade, Palak Muchhal	4:22
3.	"Barbaad Raat"	Mayur Puri	Sanam Puri, Shalmali Kholgade	3:24
4.	"Look into My Eyes"	Sameer	Ash King, Neeti Mohan	3:36
5.	"Hum Pagal Nahi Hai"	Mayur Puri	Himesh Reshammiya	4:26
6.	"Khol De Dil Ki Khidki"	Shabbir Ahmed	Mika Singh, Palak Muchhal	4:16
Total length:				24:39

== Reception ==
=== Critical response ===
Humshakals was universally panned by critics. On the review aggregator website Rotten Tomatoes, 0% of 6 critics' reviews are positive, with an average rating of 2/10.

Saurabh Dwivedi of India Today stated "for Sajid Khan, I can only say that Humshakals will be listed in one of the worst films of the century." Mihir Fadnavis wrote in his Firstpost review, "... sexual tomfoolery, shrieking and hamming aside, there's much more to hate about this 'family movie'. It's disturbing to see such an atrocious, regressive, misogynistic, sexist, homophobic cinematic product force-fed to paying audiences. I can understand that a comedy need not be 'safe', but what goes on in Humshakals is simply too horrifying to bear." Sweta Kaushal of Hindustan Times rated the film 0.5 out of 5 and stated "With no story or comedy on offer, even Riteish and Ram are unable to save the day for Sajid Khan." Writing in Emirates 24/7, Sneha May Francis claimed that it succeeded Khan's previous endeavor, Himmatwala, in becoming the worst Bollywood film ever. Critic Sonia Chopra of Sify.com wrote "there are bad movies, and then there's Humshakals. The worst film of 2014 so far, in my book". Dainik Bhaskar rated the movie as one of the worst films of the decade.

Several of the cast members also lamented their involvement in the film. Bipasha Basu didn't participate in the film's promotions calling Humshakals "the worst experience of [her] life," and Esha Gupta warned family members not to see the film. After the release of the film, leading actor Saif Ali Khan lamented that "I've been introspecting a lot and will never repeat a mistake that was Humshakals."

The film received five Golden Kela Award nominations, and won for Worst Film. It also won two Ghanta Awards; the film won Worst Picture and Ram Kapoor, Saif Ali Khan and Riteish Deshmukh shared the Worst Actor award.

=== Box office ===
Despite poor critical reception, Humshakals experienced a strong opening at the box office.

== See also ==
- List of 21st century films considered the worst
