= Dial 100 (2021 film) =

2021 film directed by Rensil D'Silva

- Release poster
- Directed by: Rensil D'Silva
- Written by: Rensil D’Silva
- Screenplay by: Rensil D’Silva
- Produced by: Siddharth P. Malhotra; Sapna Malhotra
- Starring: Manoj Bajpayee; Neena Gupta; Sakshi Tanwar
- Cinematography: Anuj Rakesh Dhawan
- Edited by: Asif Ali Shaikh
- Music by: Raju Singh
- Production companies: Sony Pictures Films India; Alchemy Films
- Distributed by: ZEE5
- Release date: 6 August 2021
- Running time: 104 minutes
- Country: India
- Language: Hindi

Dial 100 is a 2021 Indian Hindi-language thriller drama film directed by Rensil D'Silva and produced by Sony Pictures Films India, Siddharth P. Malhotra and Sapna Malhotra. The film stars Manoj Bajpayee, Neena Gupta and Sakshi Tanwar in the lead roles. The film premiered on 6 August 2021 on ZEE5. it was loosely inspired from the Danish film The Guilty.

== Plot ==
Nikhil Sood is an overworked and underpaid police officer who gets a call on the emergency helpline number 100. It is from a woman who is threatening to commit suicide. Nikhil says he needs her information in order to help her, but the woman refuses, saying she is going to die anyway.

Nikhil's wife Prerna calls to alert him that she thinks their son Dhruv could be back to his old habits of being a drug peddler. Dhruv leaves home late at night, at the same time Nikhil leaves for his late night shift. Nikhil rings his son and makes him return home. But before that, the mysterious woman threatening suicide reaches his house and holds Prerna captive. She forces Prerna to sit in her car and calls Nikhil, who realizes that she is Seema Palav. Seema's son died in a hit-and-run case; a rich spoilt brat Yash Mehra's car was the one that hit him. The case got shut down due to pressure from the city's hotshots and Seema thinks Dhruv had a hand in it. Her motive is revenge by killing Yash. She wants Dhruv to get Yash to her. Dhruv brings Yash for Seema; Nikhil also arrives.

Seema shoots both Yash and Dhruv, while Nikhil shoots Seema. Yash survives, but Dhruv is dead. In the end, similarly, Yash's parents are seen offering money to Nikhil to close the case. Nikhil returns to his control room to report the entire case, not falling for the money and the story ends.

== Cast ==
- Manoj Bajpayee as Senior Inspector Nikhil Sood
- Neena Gupta as Seema Paalav
- Sakshi Tanwar as Prerna Sood, Nikhil's wife
- Nandu Madhav as Chandrakant Paalav aka Chandu, Seema's husband
- Abhijeet Chavan as Inspector Gharat
- Urmila Mahanta as Gayatri
- Vikram Bham as Najeeb
- Madhur Arora as Suresh Nayak
- Deepanshu Titoriya as Avi
- Girish Dixit as Ashish Deshmukh
- Virandra Giri as Sangha
- Svar Kamble as Dhruv Sood, Nikhil's son
- Ivan Sylvester Rodrigues as Gautam Mehra
- Nilesh Mamgain as Gulam Ahmed
- Aman Gandotra as Yash Mehra, Gautam's son

== Production ==
The Principal photography commenced on 1 December 2020 in Mumbai.

== Reception ==
Rahul Desai of Film Companion wrote, "Even though Dial 100 gets its nihilistic messaging on point, the gimmicky execution ensures the film is about as surprising as a traffic jam in Andheri East."
