= Ghanta Awards =

Award for the worst film in Bollywood

The Ghanta Awards
- Awarded for: The Worst in Bollywood (since 2011)
- Country: India
- First award: February 2011
- Website: http://www.theghantas.com

The Ghanta Awards (sometimes abbreviated as The Ghanta) was an award presented in recognition of the worst film in Bollywood. Founded by Prashant Rajkhowa and Karan Anshuman in 2010, the annual Ghanta Awards ceremony in Mumbai took place about the same time as other major Bollywood awards. The awards themselves were a large golden bell that is typically used for idol worship.

INvision Entertainment exclusively holds the IP rights for the Ghantas Since 2013.

The Ghanta Awards is a live show shaped by online voting by the audience. The public can vote on 13 'worst of' categories.

The first Ghanta Awards ceremony was held in February 2011 at Tian Santorini to honour the worst in film of the 2010 film season. The last 2 editions have been held at JW Marriott on 15 February 2013 and 14 March 2014 respectively. The Ghanta Awards 2015 were slated to be held at the same venue on 8 March 2015 & 2021 (which is the last edition).

== Historical categories ==
- Worst Film of the Year
- Worst Actor of the Year
- Worst Actress of the Year
- Worst Director of the Year
- Worst Supporting Actor of the Year
- Worst Supporting Actress of the Year
- Worst Couple of the Year
- Worst Song of The Year
- Worst Remake, Rip-off, Sequel of the year
- Worst Holier-than-thou Movie
- WTF Was That..!!
- That's Anything But Sexy

== Categories for 2015 edition ==
- Worst Film
- Worst Director
- Worst Actor
- Worst Actress
- Worst Song
- Worst Debut
- WTF Was That!
- That's Anything But Sexy
- Most Controversial Controversy
- Worst Couple
- Worst Miscasting
- Worst Brand Endorsement
- Worst Supporting Role
- Shit Nobody Saw

== Format ==
=== Awarding process ===
Earlier, mainstream media film critics such as Rajeev Masand and Karan Anshuman picked the nominees and put them out for public vote on the awards' website. Voting closed a day before the event. Thousands of film enthusiasts usually participate in voting. Since 2014, the nominees have been decided by an internal team of professional writers and film enthusiasts at the company that manages the event.

=== Ceremony ===
The ceremony, typically held around the same time as other popular Bollywood film awards, is hosted by stand-up comedians of repute (the comedy group East India Comedy since 2014) and is interspersed with sketches mocking the worst film of the year nominees.

Collecting in person

Most winners do not attend the ceremony to collect their awards. Notable exceptions include Sonam Kapoor (Mausam/WTF Was That) and Ritesh Deshmukh (Grand Masti/That's Anything But Sexy).

== Winners ==
=== 2011 ===
1st Ghanta Awards (2011) Nominees and Winners. Winners are listed first and highlighted in boldface.

Worst Picture	Worst Director
**Pyaar Impossible!**; Blue; Raavan; Housefull; Kurbaan	**Sajid Khan (Housefull)**; Anthony D Souza (Blue); Mani Ratnam (Raavan); Jugal Hansraj (Pyaar Impossible); Rensil d' Silva (Kurbaan)
Worst Actor	Worst Actress
**Uday Chopra (Pyaar Impossible)**; Himesh Reshammiya (Radio); Abhishek Bachchan (Raavan); Shahid Kapoor (Chance Pe Dance, Milenge Milenge, Badmaash Company, Paathshaala); Akshay Kumar (Blue, Khatta Meetha, Housefull)	**Aishwarya Rai (Robot/Raavan)**; Kareena Kapoor (Kurbaan, We Are Family); Barbara Mori (Kites); Sonam Kapoor (Aisha, I Hate Luv Storys); Anushka Sharma (Badmaash Company); Katrina Kaif
Worst Supporting Actor	Worst Supporting Actress
**Zayed Khan (Blue, Anjaana Anjaani)**; Sir Ben Kingsley (Teen Patti); Farhan Akhtar (Karthik Calling Karthik); Sameer Dattani (I Hate Luv Storys); Upen Patel (Ajab Prem ki Ghazab Kahani)	**Lara Dutta (Blue/Housefull/Do Knot Disturb)**; Nandana Sen (Prince); Kangana Ranaut (Kites); Shenaz Treasurywala (Radio); Tabu (Toh Baat Pakki)
Worst Couple	Worst Breakthrough (for the worst new actors/actress)
**Uday Chopra / Priyanka Chopra (Pyaar Impossible)**; Abhishek / Aishwarya Bachchan (Raavan); Naseeruddin Shah / Vidya Balan (Ishqiya); Shahid Kapoor / Kareena Kapoor (Milenge Milenge); Sushmita Sen / Govinda (Do Knot Disturb)	**Aditya Narayan (Shaapit)**; Luv Sinha (Saadiyaan); Neha Sharma (Crook); Shazahn Padamsee (Rocket Singh); Sukhwinder Singh (Kuchh Kariye)
Worst Song	Worst Story Rip-Off
**All Izz Well (3 Idiots)**; Mann Ka Radio (Radio); Pe Pe Pe (Chance Pe Dance); Jailhouse Rock (We Are Family); Papa Jag Jayega (Housefull)	**Prince (from every action movie ever made)**; Bum Bum Bole (Children of Heaven); Jaane Kahan Se Aayi Hai (My Stepmother is an Alien); Hum Tum aur Ghost (Ghost Town); Knock Out (Phonebooth)
That's Anything But Sexy	WTF Was That
**Two hot women chasing Himesh in Radio**; Udita Goswami in Chase; Kareena Kapoor seduction in Kurbaan; The Great Indian Butterfly (Aamir Bashir / Sandhya Mridul); Girl down on her knees from London Dreams (Salman Khan / Asin)	**The vegetarian sharks that only circled, but never attacked, the bleeding Akshay Kumar, Zayed Khan & Sanjay Dutt underwater in Blue.**; Celina Jaitley's cleavage in Hello Darling!; Vivek Oberoi's Bruno-inspired leather outfit from Prince; The diamond sucking vacuum from Prince; The baby sucking vacuum from 3 Idiots

=== 2012 ===
2nd Ghanta Awards (2012) Nominees and Winners. Winners are listed first and highlighted in boldface.

Worst Picture	Worst Director
**Ra.One**; Mausam; Bodyguard; Double Dhamaal; Desi Boyz; Ready	**Anees Bazmee – Thank You**; Anubhav Sinha – Ra.One; Pankaj Kapur – Mausam; David Dhawan – Rascals; Rohit Dhawan – Desi Boyz
Worst Actor	Worst Actress
**Salman Khan – Bodyguard, Ready**; Ajay Devgn – Rascals, Dil Toh Baccha Hai Ji; Sanjay Dutt – Rascals, Chatur Singh Two Star, Double Dhamaal, Desi Boyz; Shah Rukh Khan – Ra.One, Don 2; Vinay Pathak – Utt Patang, Tere Mere Phere, Chalo Dilli, Bheja Fry 2	**Nargis Fakhri – Rockstar**; Kangana Ranaut – Game, Miley Na Miley Hum, Double Dhamaal, Tanu Weds Manu, Ready, Rascals; Jacqueline Fernandez – Murder 2; Gul Panag – Turning 30; Bipasha Basu – Dum Maaro Dum
Worst Supporting Actor	Worst Supporting Actress
**Prateik Babbar – Dhobi Ghat, Aarakshan, Dum Maaro Dum, My Friend Pinto**; Anupam Kher – Every other film; Om Puri – Don 2, Khap, Teen Thay Bhai, Bin Bulaye Baarati; Shreyas Talpade – Hum Tum Shabana, Teen Thay Bhai; Tusshar Kapoor – The Dirty Picture, Hum Tum Shabana, Shor in the City	**Hazel Keech in Bodyguard**; Giselli Monteiro in Always Kabhi Kabhie; Mallika Sherawat in Double Dhamaal; Charmy Kaur in Bbuddah Hoga Tera Baap; Raveena Tandon in Bbuddah Hoga Tera Baap
Worst Couple	Worst Breakthrough (for the worst new actors/actress)
**Ranbir Kapoor and Nargis Fakhri in Rockstar**; Shahid Kapur and Sonam Kapoor in Mausam; Kangana Ranaut and Chirag Paswan in Miley Naa Miley Hum; Kangana Ranaut and Sanjay Dutt in Rascals; Kangana Ranaut and Ajay Devgn in Rascals	**Nargis Fakhri**; Rana Daggubati; Chirag Paswan; Zoa Morani; Sarah Jane-Dias
Worst Song	Worst Story Rip-Off
**Dhinka Chika**; Jalebi Bai; Bodyguard title track; Dum Maaro Dum; Chammak Challo	**Desi Boyz – Full Monty + all Adam Sandler films**; Don 2 – every Hollywood action film; Murder 2 – The Chaser; FALTU – Accepted; Ragini MMS – Paranormal Activity
That's Anything But Sexy	WTF Was That
**Anything involving Kangana Ranaut in Rascals**; Ram Gopal Verma's camera angles in Not A Love Story; Kareena Kapoor seduction in Kurbaan; 3 girls conned by Ranveer Singh's looks and acting abilities in Ladies VS Ricky Bahl; Any time Shahrukh Khan says "Junglee Billi" in Don 2	**How Sonam Kapoor & Shahid Kapoor don't manage to exchange a measly phone number over 10 years in Mausam**; Colourful holi song in the middle of a movie about Hitler & the holocaust in 'Gandhi to Hitler'; The unexplained science behind the science fiction part of Ra.One; Ghost Rape in Haunted 3D; Akshay Kumar going to Trinity University in Desi Boyz
Worst Holier-Than-Thou Movie
**Dhobi Ghat**; No One Killed Jessica; That Girl in Yellow Boots; Shaitan; Memories in March

=== 2013 ===
Worst Picture	Worst Director
**Housefull 2**; Department; Student of the Year; Players	**RGV – Bhoot Returns, Department**; Abbas-Mustan – Players; Vikram Bhatt – Raaz 3, Dangerous Ishq; Kunal Kohli – Teri Meri Kahaani; Samir Karnik – Chaar Din Ki Chandni
Worst Actor	Worst Actress
**Ajay Devgn – Son of Sardaar, Bol Bachchan**; Akshay Kumar – Rowdy Rathore, Khiladi 786, Housefull 2, Joker; Saif Ali Khan – Agent Vinod, Cocktail, Abhishek Bachchan – Players, Bol Bachchan; Arjun Rampal – Heroine, Chakravyuh, Ajab Ghazab Love	**Sonakshi Sinha – Rowdy Rathore, Dabangg 2, Joker, Son of Sardaar**; Asin – Bol Bachchan, Housefull 2, Khiladi 786; Katrina Kaif – Jab Tak Hai Jaan, Ek Tha Tiger; Bipasha Basu – Raaz 3, Jodi Breakers, Players; Priyanka Chopra – Teri Meri Kahani, Agneepath
Worst Supporting Actor	Worst Supporting Actress
**Mithun Chakraborty – Zindagi Tere Naam, Housefull 2, Enemmy, Oh My God, Khiladi 786, Buddhuram Dhol Duniya Gol**; Boman Irani – Housefull 2, Tezz, Ferrari Ki Sawaari, Cocktail, Joker; Sanjay Dutt – Agneepath, Department, Son of Sardaar, Dabangg 2; Anupam Kher – Chaar Din Ki Chandni, Kya Super Kool Hai Hum, Jab Tak Hai Jaan, Chhodo Kal Ki Baatein; Rishi Kapoor – Agneepath, Housefull 2, Jab Tak Hai Jaan	**Sonam Kapoor – Players**; Minnisha Lamba – Joker; Anushka Sharma – Jab Tak Hai Jaan; Shazahn Padamsee – Housefull 2; Jacqueline Fernandez – Housefull 2
Worst Couple	Worst Breakthrough (for the worst new actors/actress)
**Rajneesh Duggal and Karishma Kapoor – Dangerous Ishq**; Abhishek Bachchan and Sonam Kapoor – Players; Vivek Oberoi and Mallika Sherawat – KLPD; Shahid Kapoor and Priyanka Chopra – Teri Meri Kahani; Prateik Babbar and Amy Jackson – Ek Deewana Tha	**Sunny Leone – Jism 2**; Alia Bhatt – Student of the Year; Esha Gupta – Jannat 2, Chakravyuh, Raaz 3D; Amy Jackson – Ek Deewana Tha; Pulkit Samrat – Bittoo Boss
Worst Song	Worst Rip-Off/Remake
**Paw Paw Paw Paw – Son of Sardaar**; Balma – Khiladi 786; Fevicol – Dabangg 2; Ishq Wala Love – Student of the Year; Chinta Ta Chita Chita – Rowdy Rathore	Agent Vinod – every Hollywood action film**; Barfi – every classic Hollywood film**; Teri Meri Kahaani – Chaplin meets What's Your Rashi meets Three Times**; Agneepath**; Tezz – The Bullet Train / Speed**
That's Anything But Sexy	WTF Was That
**Rani Mukherjee dancing to 'Dreamum Wakeupum' in 'Aiyya'**; 25yr old Sonakshi being made to dance with a MUCH fitter 39 yr old Malaika in 'Dabangg 2'; Anything in 'Hate Story'; Esha Gupta stripping naked because of ghost cockroaches in 'Raaz 3D'; Tushaar Kapoor's Manboobs & Striptease in 'Kya Super Kool Hai Hum'	**A love quadrangle with Jesus in 'Jab Tak Hai Jaan'**; **A ghost using a landline to call up Bipasha with information in 'Raaz 3D'**; Stolen gold being melted into 3 Mini Coopers and driven away to escape in 'Players'; Actual aliens showing up in 'Joker'; A pornstar being recruited by the CBI in 'Jism 2' and saving the country
Worst Sequel
**Housefull 2**; Raaz 3D; Jannat 2; Jism 2; Bhoot Returns

=== 2014 ===
Here's The Complete Winner List of the Ghanta Awards 2014:

Worst Film: Himmatwala

Worst Director: Sajid Khan For Himmatwala

Worst Actress: Priyanka Chopra For Zanjeer

Worst Actor: Prateik Babbar For Issaq

Worst Couple: Shah Rukh Khan and Deepika Padukone For Chennai Express

Worst Supporting Actor: Imran Khan For Once Upon a Time in Mumbai Dobaara!

Worst Supporting Actress: Ameesha Patel For Race 2 And Shortcut Romeo

Shit Nobody Saw: Sona Spa

Worst Remake: Krrish 3

That's Anything But Sexy: Grand Masti

Kuoting Krap With Karan: Salman Khan

=== 2015 ===
On March 8, 2015, the ceremony was held presenting the awards:

Worst Film: Humshakals

Worst Director: Farah Khan for Happy New Year

Worst Actress:

- **Sonakshi Sinha for Holiday and Action Jackson**
- Katrina Kaif for Bang Bang
- Tamannaah for Entertainment
- Jacqueline Fernandez for Kick

Worst Actor:

- **Saif Ali Khan, Ram Kapoor and Riteish Deshmukh for Humshakals**
- Ajay Devgn for Action Jackson
- Salman Khan for Kick
- Arjun Kapoor for Gundey

'WTF was That!': Ajay Devgn’s 'genitals' being a good luck charm in Action Jackson

Anything But Sexy: Sonakshi Sinha as a Boxer in Holiday

Special Sajid Khan Lifetime Achievement Award: Sajid Khan

Worst Song: Himesh Reshamya for Icecream Khaungi from The Xposé

Worst Case of Miscasting: Sonam Kapoor for Khoobsurat

Shit Nobody Saw: Dishkiyaoon

Worst Brand Endorsement: Vivek Oberoi for Swacch Bharat Campaign

Most Controversial Controversy: TOI and Deepika Padukone for Cleavage Gate!

Worst Couple: Arjun Kapoor and Ranveer Singh in Gunday

Worst Debut: Mika Singh and Shaan in Balwinder Singh Famous Ho Gaya

Worst Supporting Role: Kamaal R Khan or KRK for Ek Villain.

=== 2016 ===
In April 2016, the nominees for the awards were announced, with the winners being named the following month.

Worst Film

- **Shandaar**
- Roy
- Prem Ratan Dhan Payo
- Bombay Velvet

Worst Director

- **Vikas Bahl - Shaandaar**
- Karan Malhotra - Brothers
- Mohit Suri- Humari Adhoori Kahani
- Vikramjeet Singh- Roy

Worst Actor

- **Shah Rukh Khan - Dilwale**
- Ritesh Deshmukh- Bangistan
- Arjun Rampal- Roy'
- Arjun Kapoor- Tevar

Worst Actress

- Anushka Sharma - Bombay Velvet
- Aishwarya Rai - Jazbaa
- Sunny Leone - Ek Paheli Leela/ kuch kuch locha hai
- **Sonam Kapoor- Prem Ratan Dhan Paayo/Dolly Ki Doli**
- Sonakshi Sinha- Tevar

Worst Song

- Ke dil kare chu cha chu cha - Singh is Bliing
- Paani Waala Dance- Kuch Kuch Locha hai
- **Banno Tera Sweater (Swagger)**
- Daddy Mummy - Bhaag Johnny
- Prem Ratan Dhan Paayo- Title Track

Worst Debut

- Athiya Shetty - Hero
- Sooraj Pancholi - Hero
- Kapil Sharma - Kis Kisko Pyaar Karoon
- **Karan Singh Grover- Hate Story 3/Alone**
- Mandana Karimi- Bhaag Johnny

Worst Supporting Actor

- Varun Dhawan - Dilwale
- Pulkit Samrat- Bangistan/Dolly ki Doli
- Jackky Bhagnani- Welcome to Karachi
- **Neil Nitin Mukesh - "Prem Ratan Dhan Paayo"**

WTF Was That!

- Guddu ki Gun
- Dil Dhadakne Do Dog Narration (Aamir Khan)
- Kattapa ne Bahubali ko kyu maara?
- **Ranbanka (Manish Paul and Ravi Kishan)**
- Shamitabh

Worst Couple

- Anil Kapoor- Nana Patekar in Welcome Back
- **Bipasha one- Bipasha two in Alone**
- Karan Johar- Ranbir Kapoor in Bombay Velvet (Karan's character has a strong gay undertone)
- Sonam Kapoor- Varun Sharma in Dolly Ki Doli
- Amitabh-Dhanush in Shamitabh

Worst Miscasting

- Jacqueline Fernandes as a Filmmaker in Roy
- Ajay Devgn as an Intelligent Family Man in Drishyam
- Emraan Hashmi as an Invisible Man in Mr X
- **Karan Johar as Gangster in Bombay Velvet**
- Sunny Deol in I love NY as an eligible bachelor

Most Controversial Controversy

- Anushka Sharma blamed for Virat Kohli poor performance, and he replying back
- Spectre Kissing scene edited for Indian viewership (Swachh Bharat Abhiyaan!)
- **Kangana calling Hrithik her "silly ex" and everything that followed**

Shit Nobody Saw

- Hawaizaada
- Mr. X
- **Welcome to Karachi**
- All Is Well
- Hunterrr
- Ab Tak Chhappan 2
- Hamari Adhuri Kahani

The Ghanta Tweet of the year

- Sunil Grover
- Rishi Kapoor
- **Abhishek Bachchan**
- Hrithik Roshan

== See also ==
- Golden Kela Awards
- Golden Raspberry Awards
- Youth Film Handbook
