= Bade Achhe Lagte Hain =

Indian television soap opera

- Genre: Drama; Romance
- Created by: Ekta Kapoor
- Based on: Patrani by Imtiaz Patel
- Screenplay by: Dilip Jha; Archita Biswas Jha; Harneet Singh; Anil Nagpal; Saba Mumtaz; Nandini Arora; Doris Dey; Nehum Rawat; Ruchi Shah; Kovid Gupta; Akash Deep; Shilpa Jathar; Vikas Tiwari; Kamolika Bhattacharjee; Dialogues; Deepti Rawal; Shirish Latkar; Priti Mamgain; Richa Singh Gautam
- Story by: Doris Dey; Sonali Jaffar; Jayesh D. Patil; Anil Nagpal
- Directed by: Partho Mitra; Sangieta Rao; Anil V. Kumar (directed episode 166; telecasted on 12 March 2012); Rakesh Malhotra; Raja Mukherjee; Muzammil Desai; Ravindra Gautam; Ajay Kumar; Sahil Sharma; Mohit Hussein; Jaladh Sharma; Vijay K. Saini
- Creative directors: Doris Dey; Udayan Pradeep Shukla; Tanusri Dasgupta; Prashant Bhatt; Mansi Sawant; Bharvi Shah; Mohammed Suleman Quadri; Mitu
- Starring: Sakshi Tanwar; Ram Kapoor; (For entire cast see below)
- Theme music composer: Composer; R. D. Burman; Music by Lalit Sen
- Opening theme: "Bade Achhe Lagte Hain" by Shreya Ghoshal and Trijayh Dey
- Composers: Abhishek Singh; Mintu Jha
- No. of seasons: 1
- No. of episodes: 644

Production
- Executive producers: Prashant Shekle; Pradeep Hinduja; Vijay Kumar Jaiswar
- Producers: Ekta Kapoor; Shobha Kapoor
- Production locations: India; Dubai, UAE (episodes #235–#270; mid-2012); Australia (episodes #102–#117; late 2011)
- Cinematography: Mahesh Talakad; Sanjay Memane; Anil Katke; Shekhar Nagarkar
- Editors: Vikas Sharma; Vishal Sharma; Sandeep Bhatt; Prem Raaj; Vishwabandhu; Online Editor(s): Vatan Singh; Ramlochan Pandey
- Camera setup: Multi camera
- Running time: 20–30 minutes (per episode); 40–50 minutes (integration episodes)
- Production company: Balaji Telefilms Limited

Original release
- Network: Sony Entertainment Television
- Release: 30 May 2011 – 10 July 2014

Related
- Bade Achhe Lagte Hain 2 Bade Achhe Lagte Hain 3 Bade Achhe Lagte Hain 4

Bade Achhe Lagte Hain (pronounced [bəˈɽeː ˈəttʃʰeː ləɡˈteː ɦɛ̃ː]; lit. They Look So Good) is an Indian soap opera that aired on Sony Entertainment Television from 30 May 2011 to 10 July 2014. Based on the Gujarati play Patrani by Imtiaz Patel, the soap opera was created and produced by Ekta Kapoor under the banner of Balaji Telefilms. The title of the show, along with the title-track, was derived from a song composed by R.D. Burman, from the soundtrack of the 1976 Bollywood film Balika Badhu.

The show explores the worlds of Priya Sharma (Sakshi Tanwar) and Ram Kapoor (Ram Kapoor), who accidentally discover love after getting married. After the storyline moved five years ahead in June 2012, many new actors and characters, including Samir Kochhar and Amrita Mukherjee who played the roles of Rajat Kapur and Peehu respectively, were introduced.

According to The Times of India, Bade Achhe Lagte Hain is the seventh most-watched television show of 2011 in India. The soap opera won the Kalakar Award for the Best Serial and the People's Choice Award for Favourite TV Drama, both in 2012. The soap opera was voted the Most Inspiring Soap in 2013, receiving a vote count of 43.68%. It has been dubbed and rebroadcast in English, Tamil, and Telugu.

== Plot ==
42 year old Ram Kapoor is an unmarried, wealthy, established, and well-reputed Mumbai-based Punjabi Hindu businessman. 33 year old Priya Sharma is a diligent working woman and comes from a middle-class Mumbai family. Ram's stepmother Niharika only uses him for money and is responsible for creating misunderstandings between his parents Amarnath Kapoor and Krishna Kapoor when he was 22, which led to Ram's mother Krishna leaving the house.

Ram's best friend Vikram is worried about Ram’s singleness and wants him to get married. Ram's spoilt half-sister, Natasha Kapoor, and Priya's brother, Kartik Sharma, fall in love and have to consider the taboo of younger siblings marrying before their elder siblings. Ram has yet to select a prospective spouse so the marriage of Kartik and Natasha must wait.

Thus, Ram and Priya agree to the practice of watta satta although Priya dislikes the economic disparity between their families. Ram and Priya consider each other arrogant and quarrelsome. However they grow respect for each other with time and get married. Niharika is unhappy as Ram and Priya's relationship is improving day by day.

Natasha always believed she was an unplanned child of Niharika due to her behaviour. She fears she won't be able to become a good mother so she aborts her baby and hides the fact from everyone that she was pregnant. She regrets it and becomes depressed. Priya's younger sister Ayesha starts blackmailing Natasha for showstopper position in Natasha's upcoming fashion show. Ram and Priya's trust in each other increases when Priya's ex Ashwin tries to cause misunderstanding but Ram exposes him without doubting Priya at all. Ram and Priya fall in love.

Natasha causes Ayesha’s wardrobe malfunction. Sid maliciously reveals this to Ayesha hence Ayesha and Natasha have a nasty catfight in public. Priya solves their problems and Natasha tries to change but after this incident, Priya's family become skeptical of Natasha. One day a nasty argument takes place due to Sudhir becoming ill. Kartik asks Natasha to leave the house. Niharika takes advantage of this and brutally beats up Natasha and manipulates her to frame Kartik. This causes a clash between Ram and Priya. Eventually Natasha feels guilty and apologies to Priya and Kartik.

Niharika tricks Natasha into staying in a room while she frames Kartik for her kidnapping. Priya confronts Niharika and Niharika says she needs to leave Ram to save Kartik's life. Priya teams up with Vikram and his wife Neha to defeat Niharika. Natasha apologies to Sharma family and shames Niharika. Priya tries to expose Niharika with the help of Natasha, Vikram and Neha but fails. Sid causes a terrible fraud and frames Ram for the same. Niharika reveals her true face and Ram is devastated. Priya takes the blame to save Ram and gets arrested leaving Ram shattered. Ram tries his best to save Priya but Ayesha gives a testimony in Sid's favour under Sid's manipulation and promise of true love. Priya gets imprisoned. Sid plans to kill Ram but Niharika realises the error of her ways and saves Ram and dies, leaving everyone heartbroken. Guilty and devastated Sid runs away. Priya is pregnant, has an accident that others believe has killed her. She moves to Dubai out of depression as she thinks she will never be proved innocent.

== Cast ==
=== Main ===
- Sakshi Tanwar as Priya Sharma Kapoor: Sudhir and Shipra's daughter; (2011–14)
- Ram Kapoor as Ram Kapoor: A business tycoon, Amarnath and Krishna's son; (2011–14)
- Fenil Umrigar / Sonia Balani as Pihu Kapoor Shergill: Priya and Ram's daughter; (2013–14)
  - Aanchal Munjal as Teenage Pihu (2013)
  - Amrita Mukherjee as Child Pihu (2012–13)

=== Recurring ===
- Sumona Chakravarti as Natasha "Nuts" Kapoor – Amarnath and Niharika's daughter; (2011–14)
- Mohit Malhotra / Chirag Thakkar as Kartik Sharma – Shipra and Sudhir's son; (2011–14)
- Madhu Raja as Krishna "Krishu" Kapoor – Amarnath's first wife; Ram's mother; (2011–14)
- Chahat Khanna / Akanksha Juneja as Ayesha Sharma – Shipra and Sudhir's younger daughter; (2011–13)
- Eva Grover as Niharika "Sweety" Talwar Kapoor – Shiney's sister; Jayesh's ex-wife; (2011–13)
- Jai Kalra as Vikram Shergill – Neha's husband; Ram's friend and business partner; Rahul, Samar and Riddhima's father (2011–14)
- Tarana Raja Kapoor as Neha Shergill – Vikram's wife; (2011–14)
- Salim Shah / Deepak Qazir Kejriwal as Shiney “Mamaji” Talwar – Niharika's brother; (2011–14)
- Mahesh Shetty as Siddhant “Sid” Kapoor (né Karyekar) – Jayesh and Niharika's son; (2011–14)
- Shubhavi Choksey as Juhi – Priya's childhood friend; Naina's mother (2011–14)
- Gaurav Sharma / Aditya Kapadia / Ankit Narang as Khush Kapoor – Siddhant and Ayesha's son (2013–14)
  - Neev Ritesh Jain as Child Kush (2012–13)
- Vinti Idnani as Myra Kapoor – Ram and Priya's daughter; Pihu’s younger and Pari's twin sister (2013–14)
  - Ashnoor Kaur as Child Mayra (2013)
- Pragati Chourasiya as Pari Kapoor – Ram and Priya's youngest daughter; Pihu’s younger and Myra's twin sister (2013–14)
  - Zaynah Vastani as Child Pari (2013)
- Rohan Shah / Yuvraj Thakur / Lavin Gothi as Samar "Sammy" Shergill – Vikram and Neha's son; (2013–14)
- Renuka Israni as Shipra Sharma – Sudhir's wife;
- Prithvi Sankhala as Sudhir Sharma – Shipra's husband;
- Rajinder Kaur Manchanda as Mrs. Kapoor "Dadi" – Amarnath's mother;
- Samir Kochhar as Rajat Kapur – Ram's friend; Priya's landlord in Dubai; Jyoti's ex-boyfriend
- Ekta Kaul as Dr. Suhani Malhotra – Priya's nurse; Samar's lover; Gudiya's mother
- Sunny Goraya as Rishabh Kapoor – Amarnath and Niharika's son;
- Deepti Shrikant Devi / Amrin Chakkiwala as Saumya Kapoor – Rishabh's wife
- Nitin Sahrawat as Rajeev – Juhi's husband
- Niti Taylor as Naina – Juhi and Rajeev's daughter
- Azaan Rustam Shah / Anshul Pandey as Rahul Shergill – Vikram and Neha's son;
- Ruhee Bagga as Riddhima Shergill – Vikram and Neha's daughter;
- Kanika Shivpuri as Daai Jaa – Rajat's aunt and caretaker
- Priya Marathe as Jyoti Malhotra – Rajat's ex-girlfriend; Raina and Cady's mother
- Arshima Thapar as Kadambari "Cady" Malhotra – Jyoti's daughter;
- Vaibhav Joshi as Rehaan – Neha's son from her colleague
- Sonal Parihar as Jhanvi Sharma – Kartik's second wife;
- Yatin Mehta as Raunak Sharma – Kartik and Jhanvi's son;
- Harsh Khurana as Ashwin Khanna – Priya's ex-fiancé;
- Madhumita Das as Shruti Khanna – Ashwin's wife; Priya's friend; Varun's mother
- Rohan Mehra as Varun Khanna – Ashwin and Shruti's son; Pihu's college friend
- Amit Bhalla as Dr. Jayesh Karyekar (later Patil) – Niharika's first husband; Siddhant and Ishika's father; Khush's grandfather
- Asha Negi as Apeksha Malhotra – Krishna's adoptive daughter; Ram's adoptive sister (2011–12)
- Kajal Pisal as Ishika Kapoor Dhanrajgir – Jayesh and Niharika's daughter;
- Parakh Madan as Harry - Vikram's boss
- Saptrishi Ghosh as Rishi Shandeliya – Ram's employee
- Karan Veer Mehra as Bhanu Shergill – Vikram's brother
- Charu Asopa as Saudamini – Ayesha's friend; Shiney's girlfriend
- Anshuman Singh Mahant as Shags – Natasha'a colleague
- Rakshanda Khan as Isha Singhania – Ram's crush; Ram, Vikram, and Neha's college friend
- Rushad Rana as Ram, Vikram, and Neha's college friend
- Dimpy Ganguli as Preetika – Ayesha's friend
- Karan Jotwani as Mandeep Bittu Singh — Pihu's ex-fiancé
- Nandini Sen as Nandini Bittu Singh – Mandeep's mother
- Mamta Luthra as Shipra's mother
- Jai Shahideu as Saksh
- Nivin Ramani as Robin
- Neel Motwani as Daljeet Kapoor – Ram, Natasha and Rishab's cousin
- Bobby Arora as Bobby Singh
- Loveleen Kaur Sasan as Jenny – Ram's office secretary
- Rajdeep Sikdar as Ram’s office staff

=== Guest appearances ===
- Akshay Kumar to promote his film Once Upon ay Time in Mumbai Dobaara!
- Jackky Bhagnani and Neha Sharma to promote their film Youngistaan
- Priyanka Chopra and Ram Charan to promote their film Zanjeer
- Ronit Roy to promote his television series Adaalat
- Sanaya Irani to promote her television series Chhanchhan
- Tusshar Kapoor and John Abraham to promote their film Shootout at Wadala
- Tusshar Kapoor and Riteish Deshmukh to promote their film Kyaa Super Kool Hain Hum
- Vidya Balan and Emraan Hashmi to promote their film The Dirty Picture
- Vidya Balan to promote her film Shaadi Ke Side Effects

== Production ==
=== Development ===
The name of the soap opera, along with its title track, has been inspired by a song of the same name, composed by R. D. Burman, from the soundtrack of the 1976 Bollywood film Balika Badhu. Based on the Gujarati play Patrani by Imtiaz Patel, the soap opera is created by Ekta Kapoor and produced by her production company Balaji Telefilms. Ekta Kapoor had got the name, Bade Achhe Lagte Hain, registered about six years before the soap opera premiered.

=== Filming ===
Bade Achhe Lagte Hain is reportedly one of the soap operas in India that broke the monotone of endless indoors-only sequences. Most of its shooting has been done in India. But many episodes of the soap opera have also been shot in foreign locales. Sixteen episodes of the soap opera (episodes 102–117) were shot in Australia over 14 days, in partnership with Tourism Australia, in late 2011, to portray the honeymoon of Ram (Kapoor) and Priya (Tanwar). Bade Achhe Lagte Hain also received support from Destination New South Wales, Sony Entertainment Television India and Balaji Telefilms. (Note: See references:)

During the summer of 2012, Ekta Kapoor introduced a five-year leap in the narrative. After this leap, 36 episodes of Bade Achhe Lagte Hain (episodes 235–270) had content which was shot in Dubai, UAE over a period of 10 days. (Note: See references:) These episodes portray Priya (Tanwar) living with her five-year-old daughter Peehu (Amrita Mukherjee) in the city until she has to return to Mumbai, in India. The production team failed to obtain the correct permits to shoot in Dubai and had to briefly stop shooting until the paperwork was processed. (Note: See references:)

== Music ==
The title track of the soap opera, inspired by the song Bade Achhe Lagte Hain is composed by R. D. Burman, from the 1976 Bollywood movie, Balika Badhu. The lyrics of the soap opera's title track have been penned up by Nawab Arzoo and the title track has been sung by Shreya Ghoshal and Trijayh Dey. Lalit Sen provided the music to the title track. The background music or the incidental music of the soap opera has been provided by Abhishek Singh and Mintu Jha. It also includes songs from soundtrack albums of few Bollywood movies. The Tamil version of the title track song was sung by Shweta Mohan, with hummings of Shreya Ghoshal reused.

== Broadcast ==
Bade Achhe Lagte Hain premiered on Sony Entertainment Television in India on 30 May 2011. It was initially intended to run for 150 episodes but it went on to telecast a total of 644 episodes, going off-air after completing a run of 3 years, 2 months and 41 days. (Note: See references:)

Bade Achhe Lagte Hain was dubbed in Telugu and broadcast on Gemini TV as Nuvvu Nachhavu, an afternoon soap opera, premiered on 9 April 2012. Bade Achhe Lagte Hain has also been dubbed in Tamil under the title Ullam Kollai Poguthada, and it premiered on Polimer TV, on 10 December 2012, with some of the characters' names changed.

=== Integration episodes ===
The show had two integration episodes with Kya Hua Tera Vaada on 4 and 5 December 2012 and one with Kehta Hai Dil...Jee Le Zara on 6 December 2013.

== Other media ==
=== Reboots ===
In July 2021, a sequel was announced, with the title Bade Achhe Lagte Hain 2. Nakuul Mehta was finalized as the male-lead of the sequel. Disha Parmar was approached and locked by the makers to play the female lead, doing her second project with Mehta after seven years. On 12 August 2021, the first teaser for the same was unveiled featuring leads, Mehta and Parmar, as Ram Kapoor and Priya Sood. The show premiered on 30 August 2021.

Bade Achhe Lagte Hain 3 was announced after the previous season's TRP fell. The original leads of the previous season Mehta and Parmar were cast as the leads, marking their second collaboration with Ekta Kapoor.

Bade Achhe Lagte Hain 4 was announced on 25 March 2025. It stars Harshad Chopda and Shivangi Joshi as Rishabh "Rishu" Kapoor and Bhagyashree "Bhagya" Iyer.

=== Adaptations ===
Language	Title	Original release	Network(s)	Last aired	Notes
Malayalam	Anuraga Ganam Pole അനുരാഗ ഗാനം പോലെ	17 April 2023	Zee Keralam	15 March 2024	Remake
Kannada	Amruthadhaare ಅಮೃತಧಾರೆ	29 May 2023	Zee Kannada	15 November 2026	Remake
Tamil	Nenjathai Killadhe நெஞ்சத்தை கில்லாதே	1 July 2024	Zee Tamil	17 January 2025	Remake
Marathi	Veen Doghantali Hi Tutena वीण दोघांतली ही तुटेना	11 August 2025	Zee Marathi	Ongoing	Remake

== Reception ==
=== Response ===
Bade Achhe Lagte Hain had a television viewer rating of 1.3 in the debut week after its premiere, which increased ten weeks later to 3.7. It became the fifth most-watched Hindi television show in the thirty–fourth week (14–20 August) of 2011 in India, helping propel the broadcasting channel, Sony Entertainment Television India to number two in the rankings of the Hindi general entertainment television channels. The soap opera had a television viewer rating of 3.7 that week while Sony Entertainment Television India recorded a gross rating point of 245. In the forty eighth week of 2011 (25 November – 1 December), the soap opera became the fourth most-watched television show in India with a TVR of 4.30, and is the seventh most-watched of 2011.

Episode #166 which was directed by Anil V. Kumar and telecast on 12 March 2012, portrayed Ram and Priya consummating their marriage. (Note: See references:) The episode was backed by a teaser to draw hype and interest. Within minutes of its telecast the episode went viral on YouTube with nearly 150,630 hits and counting. (Note: See references:) It also trended on social networking and microblogging sites such as Twitter. (Note: See references:) India Today described the episode as "aesthetically shot" whileTimes of India described it as "action packed". There was mocking of the episode and the overweight Ram Kapoor from some segments; Ram Kapoor responded that he would not lose weight for the television industry. (Note: See references:) IBN Live commented, "Indian television is still a good few decades immature when it comes to sex on the TV screen. So much for all the matured relationships and relevant themes – love making on Indian TV is as painful and archaic as the shaking flowers replacing actors on screen when they kiss or make love. A small sigh of relief and Ekta Kapoor and the director can congratulate themselves for the real onscreen peck on the lips." The episode was hyped as a couple on an Indian television had never before been so bold. (Note: See references:) The episode worried certain viewers who did not want to watch the episode with their children. Emirates 24/7 called it a "shocker to the Indian families". Yet India Today described it as a "big surprise for the audiences". Times of India rated the consummation scene as the Top Intimate Moment on TV. (Note: See references:) The last couple who had kissed on Indian television was Aditya Jakhar (Raqesh Vashisht) and Priya Jakhar (Ridhi Dogra) in the STAR Plus soap opera, Maryada...Lekin Kab Tak? in 2010. Following the telecast of the episode Ram Kapoor tweeted a thank you.

Bade Achhe Lagte Hain is the second most-watched fictional Hindi television show in the weekdays of the twenty-ninth week of 2012 (15–21 July) with a Television Rating Point (TRP) of 4.2, which was 0.5 points up from the TRP of the previous week (8–14 July) when the show had a TRP of 3.7. In early January 2013, the soap opera's TRP went down to 2.3.

In a 2014 poll conducted by Shaadi.com, Ram and Priya were voted the Favourite TV Couple by 42.3% of Indians. Fans even dub the on-screen couple Raya (also written as RaYa), which is a linguistic blend of the pair's names. Ram Kapoor was also called "the Indian husband we love" by a Sunday publication in 2012. Ram Kapoor and Sakshi Tanwar later came together to portray the role of a couple in the ALTBalaji web-series Karrle Tu Bhi Mohabbat, which premiered in 2017 and was noted for its common plot elements with Bade Achhe Lagte Hain.

== Accolades ==
Bade Achhe Lagte Hain won the Kalakar Award for the Best Serial in 2012. In addition, the show has won six Indian Television Academy Awards, three Star Guild Awards, five Indian Telly Awards, three FICCI Frames Excellence Honours and two People's Choice Awards (including the Favourite TV Drama award).
