= Mai (TV series) =

Indian Hindi-language series

- Genre: Drama; Mystery; Thriller
- Created by: Atul Mongia
- Written by: Atul Mongia; Shristi Rindani; Tamal Sen; Vishrut Singh; Amita Vyas
- Directed by: Anshai Lal; Atul Mongia
- Starring: Sakshi Tanwar; Wamiqa Gabbi; Prashant Narayanan; Raima Sen; Vivek Mushran; Ankur Ratan; Anant Vidhat Sharma; Vaibhav Raj Gupta
- Country of origin: India
- Original language: Hindi
- No. of seasons: 1
- No. of episodes: 6

Production
- Executive producer: Anshai Lal
- Producers: Anushka Sharma and Karnesh Ssharma
- Cinematography: Ravi Kiran Ayyagari
- Editor: Manas Mittal
- Running time: 45-50 minutes
- Production company: Clean Slate Filmz

Original release
- Network: Netflix
- Release: 15 April 2022 – present

Mai: A Mother's Rage or simply known as Mai is a 2022 Indian Hindi-language action thriller television series on Netflix created by Atul Mongia, directed by Anshai Lal and produced by Anushka Sharma with her elder brother Karnesh Ssharma under the banner of Clean Slate Filmz. The series stars Sakshi Tanwar, Wamiqa Gabbi, Prashant Narayanan, Raima Sen, Anant Vidhat Sharma and Vaibhav Raj Gupta in lead roles. It follows a story of a grieving mother who discovers the criminals behind her daughter's tragic death, and transforms from meek to merciless to get the real cause behind death. The series premiered on 15 April 2022 on Netflix. It was renewed for a second season.

== Synopsis ==
Sheel Chaudhary, a middle-class mother and a nurse working at Geeta Bhawan, an old age home, witnesses the death of her daughter, Supriya, by a speeding truck. During the post-funeral ceremonies, she stumbles upon the fact that her daughter's death was not an accident, but a case of pre-meditated murder. The tragedy pushes the mourning mother to uncover the truth about the killing of her daughter.

== Cast ==
- Sakshi Tanwar as Sheel Chaudhary
- Wamiqa Gabbi as Supriya Chaudhary / Gudiya
- Raima Sen as Neelam
- Prashant Narayanan as Jawahar Vyas/Mohandas Vyas (Twin Brothers)
- Vivek Mushran as Yash Chaudhary
- Ankur Ratan as SP Farooque Siddiqui
- Saurabh Dubey as Raghu
- Vaibhav Raj Gupta as Shankar
- Anant Vidhaat Sharma as Prashant
- Seema Pahwa as Kalpana
- Mikhail Gandhi as Archit Chaudhary
- Akash Khurana as Vishnu Goyal
- Rashmi Seth as Kusum Vyas
- Ikhlaque Khan as Dr. Chaudhary
- Anubha Fatehpuria as Mrs. Chaudhary
- Sandeepa Dhar as Inaya Siddiqui
- Sarika Singh as Meenu
- Omkar Jaiprakash as Keshav
- Amit Singh Thakur as Jayesh Desai
- Siddhant Mahajan as Vikram

== Episodes ==
| No. overall | No. in season | Title | Directed by | Written by | Original release date |
|---|---|---|---|---|---|
| 1 | 1 | "The Silent Witness" | Anshai Lal | Atul Mongia | 15 April 2022 |
Sheel Chaudhary, a seemingly ordinary woman in her fifties, works tirelessly as a nurse at a senior citizens’ home in Lucknow. Her days are monotonously predictable, split between managing her demanding job and caring for her family. Her daughter Supriya, a mute and fiercely independent young woman, is the pride of her life. Supriya’s promising future, however, is abruptly and tragically cut short when she dies in a hit-and-run accident during a wedding function. The grief-stricken Sheel begins to notice subtle inconsistencies in the events surrounding Supriya’s death. Witnesses are evasive, the police appear dismissive, and the victim’s employer, a powerful pharmaceutical company, seems unusually eager to settle the matter quietly. Sheel’s quiet demeanor masks her growing resolve to uncover the truth. In a poignant moment of realization, Sheel vows not to let her daughter’s death be reduced to another statistic. The episode concludes with Sheel finding a cryptic note in Supriya’s belongings, hinting at a hidden danger.
| 2 | 2 | "The Other Side" | Anshai Lal | Atul Mongia | 15 April 2022 |
Sheel delves into Supriya’s personal and professional life, determined to find answers. Her investigation leads her to the imposing office of Supriya’s employer, Rana Pharmaceutical. While the company’s CEO, Jawahar Rana, maintains a façade of concern, Sheel’s instincts tell her there is more beneath the surface. Conversations with Supriya’s coworkers reveal that Supriya had stumbled upon sensitive information about the company’s illegal activities—a discovery that may have cost her life. As Sheel pieces together Supriya’s final days, she faces resistance from every quarter. Her husband and extended family, already struggling to cope with the loss, urge her to let go and move on. The police warn her against meddling in an ongoing investigation, and her efforts to get witnesses to speak up lead to stonewalling and veiled threats. Yet, Sheel’s maternal instincts and unyielding resolve keep her going. The episode’s climax reveals that the hit-and-run may have been premeditated. Sheel’s discovery of a CCTV recording showing a deliberate swerve toward Supriya cements her belief that her daughter’s death was no accident. Her growing determination sets the stage for her transformation from a grieving mother to a force to be reckoned with.
| 3 | 3 | "A Mother's Wrath" | Anshai Lal | Atul Mongia | 15 April 2022 |
Sheel’s quiet investigation begins to turn darker as she realizes that seeking justice for Supriya might require crossing ethical and legal boundaries. Her quest leads her to a shadowy underworld linked to Rana Pharmaceutical—a network of money laundering, drug trafficking, and political corruption. As Sheel gets closer to the truth, her life is threatened by a chilling encounter with a local fixer, who warns her to back off. Refusing to be intimidated, Sheel decides to take matters into her own hands. Using her position as a nurse, she secretly gathers information from patients and contacts with ties to the criminal syndicate. Her first act of defiance comes when she intercepts crucial documents that could expose the syndicate’s illegal dealings. The process is fraught with danger, as Sheel must navigate the moral and emotional toll of her choices. In a pivotal scene, Sheel’s maternal love drives her to commit her first act of violence to protect a witness willing to speak up about Supriya’s murder. The episode ends with Sheel staring at the blood on her hands, her resolve to find the truth now intertwined with the darker side of her personality that she never knew existed.
| 4 | 4 | "Lines Crossed" | Anshai Lal | Atul Mongia | 15 April 2022 |
Sheel’s relentless pursuit of justice pushes her deeper into the criminal world, where alliances are as fragile as glass and betrayal lurks at every corner. Her next lead takes her to a remote warehouse, where Rana Pharmaceutical’s operations are said to be headquartered. Sheel infiltrates the premises under the guise of a low-level worker, uncovering incriminating evidence about the company’s connection to political figures and organized crime. Her presence, however, does not go unnoticed. Sheel’s cover is blown when she is caught snooping through restricted files. The ensuing confrontation results in a high-stakes chase, with Sheel barely escaping with her life. Her daring escape is aided by a former employee of the company, who reveals that Supriya had confided in him about her fears. This employee becomes a reluctant ally, providing Sheel with crucial information that ties her daughter’s murder to Jawahar Rana himself. As Sheel processes this revelation, she faces an impossible choice: should she turn over the evidence to the police, who have shown little interest in pursuing justice, or continue her lone crusade against a seemingly invincible adversary? The episode concludes with Sheel making a risky decision to confront Rana directly, setting the stage for a dangerous showdown.
| 5 | 5 | "A Web of Lies" | Anshai Lal | Atul Mongia | 15 April 2022 |
The penultimate episode explores the emotional and psychological cost of Sheel’s journey. Her relationships with her family and friends deteriorate as she becomes increasingly secretive and single-minded. Her husband begins to suspect that Sheel’s obsession with Supriya’s death has spiraled out of control, leading to heated confrontations that test the limits of their marriage. Meanwhile, Sheel’s relentless investigation uncovers shocking truths about people she thought she could trust. Her closest ally turns out to be a mole, feeding information to the syndicate in exchange for protection. Betrayed but undeterred, Sheel devises a plan to outmaneuver her enemies. Using the knowledge she has gathered so far, she sets a trap to lure Jawahar Rana into a position of vulnerability. The episode’s climax sees Sheel narrowly escaping an assassination attempt orchestrated by the syndicate. Her survival comes at a great cost, as she is forced to sacrifice someone she cares deeply for in order to protect herself. This harrowing experience hardens Sheel’s resolve, transforming her into a formidable adversary determined to see justice served, no matter the price.
| 6 | 6 | "The Final Stand" | Anshai Lal | Atul Mongia | 15 April 2022 |
In the series finale, Sheel’s journey comes to a head as she prepares for a final confrontation with Jawahar Rana and his network. Armed with damning evidence and an unwavering resolve, she orchestrates a high-stakes plan to expose the conspiracy. The episode weaves together multiple storylines, showing Sheel’s meticulous preparation and the rising tension among the syndicate’s members as they realize the extent of her knowledge. The climactic confrontation unfolds in a tense, edge-of-your-seat sequence. Sheel confronts Rana in a public setting, leveraging media attention to ensure that his crimes cannot be covered up. The confrontation turns violent, with Sheel narrowly escaping yet again. However, her determination pays off when key evidence is leaked to the press, sparking a nationwide scandal. The episode concludes with Sheel returning home, physically battered but emotionally triumphant. While her journey has taken a toll on her relationships and her own sense of self, she finds solace in the knowledge that she has honored Supriya’s memory. The final scene hints at lingering threats, leaving the door open for further exploration of Sheel’s transformation from a grieving mother to a symbol of relentless justice.

== Release ==
The series was earlier announced by Netflix India to release in 2021 but was delayed due to its pending post production work. It was finally released on 15 April 2022.

== Reception ==
=== Critical response ===
Shubhra Gupta from The Indian Express gave a positive review to the series stating, "Despite the elements that stretch our credulity, Sakshi Tanwar manages to hold our attention." Nandini Ramnath from Scroll.in wrote, "This netflix crime series is a boilerplate thriller ladled out on elegant dishes."
