= Western India Automobile Association =

Automobile association headquartered in Mumbai

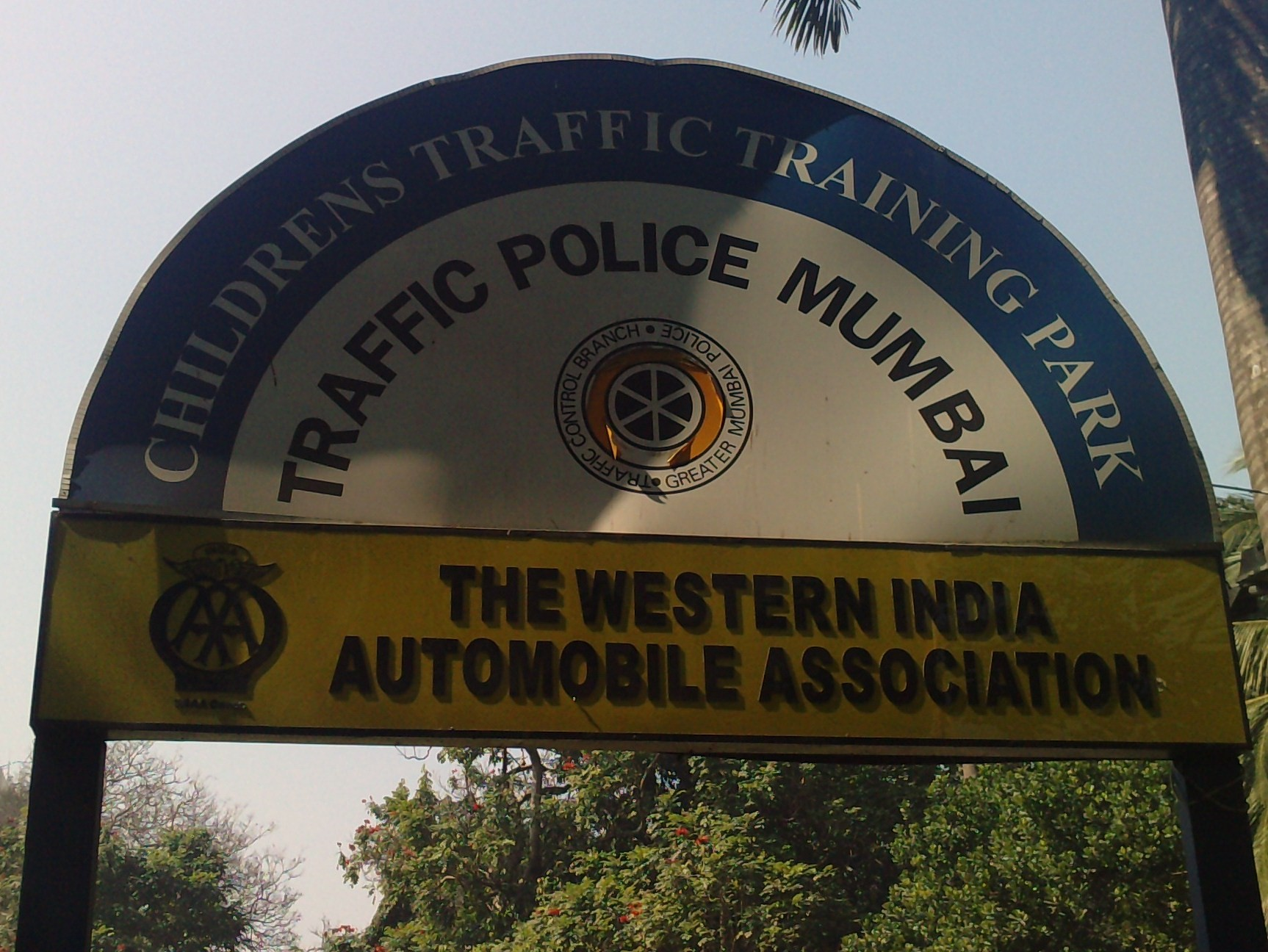
Children's Traffic Training Park, Mumbai, jointly by Mumbai traffic police and WIAA

The Western India Automobile Association (WIAA) was founded in 1919 and is one of the largest motoring organisations in Asia with over 108,000 members. The head office is located in Mumbai with branches in Ahmedabad, Pune, Nagpur, Jaipur and Goa. The association has reciprocal service arrangements with automobile associations and clubs all over the world.

== History ==
The beginnings of Western India Automobile Association goes back to 1904. The inaugural car rally in India from New Delhi to Mumbai in 1904 was organized by the Western Motor Union. Subsequently, the union merged with WIAA, which currently collaborates with the global motorsports governing body, FIA (Fédération Internationale de l'Automobile).

Until 1970, WIAA stood as the foremost motorsports association in India, consistently organizing and promoting motorsports events nationwide. However, in 1971, the WIAA committee concluded that sustaining active involvement in motorsports demanded increased staffing and capital. Consequently, a decision was made to discontinue active participation in motorsports. It was during this pivotal year that FMSCI, the Federation of Motor Sports Club of India, was established.

In 2006, WIAA elected Nitin Dossa as its chairman and director.

Upon Nitin Dossa's entry into WIAA, he brought with him a wealth of experience in car rallying, effectively revitalizing motorsports within the organization. Under his leadership, WIAA successfully hosted its inaugural all-women car rally a decade ago. In 2019, marked another significant milestone as, for the first time, the rally was organized entirely by an all-women crew. This achievement is not only a first in India but also stands as a global milestone, with FIA acknowledging that a car rally of this magnitude has never been organized by an all-women crew before.

In 2019, WIAA celebrated its 100th anniversary at which point it had more 108,000 members. The association held its celebration event at the Taj Mahal Palace Hotel’s ball room, the same venue that hosted its first ever AGM back in 1919.

== Purpose ==
The association is empowered under the Motor Vehicles Act and Rules to:

- Undertake driving tests for the issue of Driver's Licenses for cars and two-wheelers.
- Issue International Driving Permits for members traveling abroad.

The association is also represented on various Central and State Government bodies, including the State Road Safety Councils and Accident Prevention Committees. It periodically organizes courses and camps on road safety, advanced driving and car pollution for the benefit of motorists in general, conducts vintage and classic car/bike rallies empowering women drivers around the globe.

== See also ==
- The Automobile Association
