= Karrle Tu Bhi Mohabbat =

Indian Hindi web series

- Genre: Drama
- Created by: Ekta Kapoor
- Developed by: Ekta Kapoor
- Written by: Reshu Nath
- Directed by: Muzammil Desai
- Creative directors: Prashant Bhatt; Sonalika Bhonsle
- Starring: Ram Kapoor; Sakshi Tanwar
- Theme music composer: Pritam Chakraborty
- Opening theme: Karrle Tu Bhi Mohabbat
- Composer: Binod Ghimile
- Country of origin: India
- Original language: Hindi
- No. of seasons: 3
- No. of episodes: 42

Production
- Producers: Ekta Kapoor; Shobha Kapoor
- Production locations: Mumbai, Maharashtra India
- Editors: Vikas Sharma; Vishal Sharma; Sandip Bhatt
- Camera setup: Multi-camera
- Running time: 19-25 minutes
- Production company: Balaji Telefilms

Original release
- Network: ALT Balaji; ZEE5
- Release: 21 April 2017 - 4 April 2019

Karrle Tu Bhi Mohabbat is a Hindi web series created and produced by Ekta Kapoor for ALTBalaji and ZEE5. It stars Ram Kapoor and Sakshi Tanwar. The series is about two opposite people falling in love with each other. The series was launched on Zee TV on 25 March 2020 as a substitute to the Zee TV shows whose broadcast had to be stopped by the channel due to COVID-19 pandemic.

== Overview ==
Season	Episodes	Season premiere	Ref
1	15	28 April 2017	
2	14	14 February 2018	
3	13	4 April 2019	

== Plot ==
Karan Khanna is a superstar and recovering alcoholic who takes a detox trip to Mahabaleshwar with his new counselor Dr. Tripurasundari Nagrajan (Tipsy/Tanpura/Tirumalai Express/Nagarjuna), who he dislikes because of her strictness. The story takes a turn when he attends his estranged daughter's wedding and discovers that opposites can truly attract. The show explores how romance blossoms between the distinctly different personalities of Karan and Tipsy.

== Cast ==
=== Main ===
- Ram Kapoor as Karan "KK" Khanna; A superstar, Radhika's ex-husband, Tipsy's husband, Trisha and Piya's biological father.
- Sakshi Tanwar as Dr. Tripurasundari "Tipsy" Nagrajan: A de-addiction therapist, Karan's wife, Piya's mother.
- Arshia Verma as Piya Nagrajan: Tipsy and Karan's daughter, Ved's adoptive daughter.
- Shweta Kawatra as Radhika Awasthi: Karan's ex-wife.
- Sanyukta Timsina as Trisha Awasthi: Radhika and Karan's daughter, Prabuddha's adoptive daughter.
- Sameer Kochhar as Palash Arora: Mr. Mehta's son, Tipsy's ex-boyfriend.
- Hiten Tejwani as Ved Saxena: Tipsy's friend/lover, a lawyer.
- Karishma Tanna as Zoya Hussain: Karan's business partner and friend, a producer.
- Sunayana Fozdar as Divya: Karan "KK" Khanna's manager.

=== Recurring ===
- Tanvi Vyas as Sherry: Tipsy's maternal cousin, Vishal's wife.
- Kavi Shastri / Puneet Tejwani as Vishal: Karan's best friend, Sherry's husband.
- Farida Patel Venkat as Venkateshwari Nagrajan alias "Amma": Tipsy's mother, Karan "KK"'s mother-in-law, Sherry's maternal aunt.
- Faezeh Jalali as Romila Chhetri: Actress, Karan's obsessive fan with mental issues and the occasional comic relief.
- Vikram Kapadiya as Prabuddha Kohli: Radhika's second husband, Trisha's adoptive father (Deceased).
- Dishank Arora / Rohan Gandotra as Rohan Patel: Trisha's love interest.
- Vatsal Seth as Aryan Khan: A lead actor, Karan's professional rival.
- Iris Maity as Sanam Mehta
- Devaksh Rai as Private Investigator

=== Special appearance ===
- Aftab Shivdasani
- Akshay Kumar
- Anil Kapoor
- Bipasha Basu
- Jeetendra
- Karan Johar
- Parineeti Chopra
- Ranbir Kapoor
- Rishi Kapoor
- Ronit Roy
- Saif Ali Khan
- Sanjay Kapoor
- Sonali Bendre
- Vivek Oberoi
- Vidya Balan

== Reception ==
Gursimran Kaur Banga of The Times of India wrote, "The story is fast-paced and there are no slow moments. It is the quick succession in the plot that keeps you hooked and makes you look forward to the story. The winner in the web series is the fabulous chemistry shared by Ram Kapoor and Sakshi Tanwar."
