= Eva Grover =

Indian film and television actress

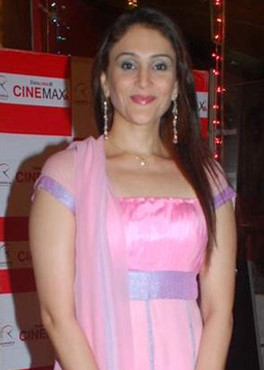
- Grover at the premiere of Diwangi Ne Had Kar Di
- Occupation: Actress

Eva Grover (born Kareena Grover) is an Indian actress who has played supportive roles in numerous Hindi films and soap operas.

== Personal life ==
Eva Grover was married to Hyder Ali Khan, who is step-brother of Aamir Khan. She eloped to marry him, because her mother was opposed to their union as it was an inter-faith marriage. She has a daughter from the marriage. Eva divorced Khan 5 years later due to Marital abuse.

== Filmography ==
=== Films ===
Year	Work	Language	Role	Notes
2015	Yaara Silly Silly	Hindi		
2013	Asa Mee Ashi Tee	Marathi		
2013	Dushman Ke Khoon Pani Hai	Bhojpuri		
2011	Ready	Hindi	Daughter-in-law of Amar Chaudhary	
2010	My Friend Ganesha 3	Hindi	Mother	
2002	Maseeha	Hindi		
1999	Nyaydaata	Hindi	Tara	
1998	Khote Sikkey	Hindi	Sonu	
1998	Aunty No. 1	Hindi	Usha	
1997	Shapath	Hindi	Neena / Shalu	
1997	Krishna Arjun	Hindi	Poonam	
1997	Dharma Karma	Hindi		
1996	Smuggler	Hindi		
1996	Krishna	Hindi	Sudha	
1996	Laalchee	Hindi	Suman	
1995	Kattumarakaran	Tamil	Vaidehi	

=== Television ===
Year	Work	Language	Role	Notes
1999	Rishtey - The Love Stories	Hindi	Menaka	episode: Agreement
1999	Kora Kagaz	Hindi	Sneha	
1999	Zee Horror Show	Hindi	Guest appearance	
2001	Office Office	Hindi	Tina	
2001–2003	Hum Saath Aath Hain	Hindi	Nirmala	
2002	Kittie Party		Hindi	
2002–2008	Kumkum – Ek Pyara Sa Bandhan	Hindi	Simmi	
2003–2004	Karishma Kaa Karishma	Hindi	Sheetal Malhotra	
2004–2005	Dil Vil Pyar Vyar	Hindi	Madhu	
2005	LOC - Life Out of Control	Hindi		
2005–2006	Shararat	Hindi	Radha Malhotra	
2007–2008	Gupshup Coffee Shop	Hindi		
2008	Waqt Batayega Kaun Apna Kaun Paraya	Hindi	Jaya	
2008	Sapna Babul Ka...Bidaai	Hindi	Sheetal	
2009	CID	Hindi	Ananya	episode:Khooni Khabar
2010	Do Saheliyaan... Kismat Ki Kathputaliyaan	Hindi		
2010	Ek Veer Stree Ki Kahaani... Jhansi Ki Rani	Hindi	Bhagirathi Tambe	
2011–2014	Bade Achhe Lagte Hain	Hindi	Niharika Kapoor	
2015–2016	Tashan-E-Ishq	Hindi	Anita Luthra	
2018	Har Mushkil Ka Hal Akbar Birbal	Hindi	Mah Chuchak Begum	
