= Sakshi Tanwar =

Indian actress (born 1973)

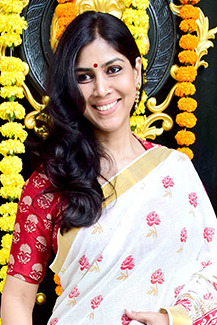
- Tanwar in 2018
- Born: 12 January 1973 (age 53); Alwar, Rajasthan, India
- Education: Lady Shri Ram College; Delhi University
- Occupations: Actress, television presenter
- Years active: 1996–present
- Children: 1 (adopted)
- Awards: Full list

Sakshi Tanwar (pronounced [ˈsaːkʂi ˈt̪əɳʋəɾ]; born 12 January 1973) is an Indian actress and presenter, who primarily works in Hindi films and television. Known for her portrayals of strong-willed, unconventional women in Indian television, Tanwar is considered among the highest-paid television actresses in India. She is a recipient of several awards including two ITA Awards and one Filmfare OTT Award. She has appeared in Forbes India's Celebrity 100 list of 2012.

Tanwar is widely recognised for her portrayal of Parvati Agarwal in Kahaani Ghar Ghar Kii (2000-2008) and Priya Sharma Kapoor in Bade Achhe Lagte Hain (2011-2014), both these performances earned her two Indian Television Academy Awards. Tanwar made her film debut in 2006 with O re Manva and has since appeared in the biographical sports drama Dangal (2016) and the historical drama Samrat Prithviraj (2022). Alongside her work in television, Tanwar received praises for the series — Karrle Tu Bhi Mohabbat (2017-2019), Mission Over Mars (2019) and Mai: A Mother's Rage (2022), the latter won her the Filmfare OTT Award for Best Actress Critics – Drama Series.

== Early life ==
Tanwar was born on 12 January 1973 to Rajendra Singh Tanwar, a retired CBI officer, in a middle-class Rajput family from Alwar, Rajasthan, India. She was educated in many Kendriya Vidyalayas before graduating from Lady Shri Ram College in New Delhi. Prior to this, in 1990, after completing her pre-university course, she worked as a sales trainee at a five-star hotel. In college, she was the secretary and president of the dramatic society. After graduation, while preparing for the entrance tests to the administrative services and mass communications, she gave an audition for the national broadcaster Doordarshan's film songs based program Albela Sur Mela in 1998; she was selected as the presenter.

== Career ==
=== Established television actress (1999–2014) ===
After her television debut in 1998 with Albela Sur Mela, Tanwar rose to fame with Ekta Kapoor's Kahaani Ghar Ghar Kii (2000–2008). The series based on joint family, saw her portray Parvati Agarwal opposite Kiran Karmarkar. The series was a major success and earned her recognition. Her performance was also praised by several critics. The series earned her several nominations including ITA Award for Best Actress – Popular and won her the Indian Telly Award for Best Actress in a Lead Role.

Tanwar then played Maya Mittal in Kutumb, the lead Gayatri Sharma in Devi, Advocate Indira Bhargav in Jassi Jaissi Koi Nahin and Ganga in Kahaani Hamaaray Mahaabhaarat Ki. In 2010, she hosted the second season of Crime Patrol.

Tanwar later established herself with Ekta Kapoor's Bade Achhe Lagte Hain (2011–2014). She portrayed Priya Sharma Kapoor, a woman who marries in her late 30s opposite Ram Kapoor. The series was a massive success and her performance earned her critical acclaim. The series won her several awards including ITA Award for Best Actress – Jury and Indian Telly Award for Best Actress – Jury. In 2012, she made an appearance on the reality show Kaun Banega Crorepati.

=== Film and web expansion (2015–present) ===
In 2015, Tanwar made her Marathi film debut with Katyar Kaljat Ghusali, which was a critical and commercial success.

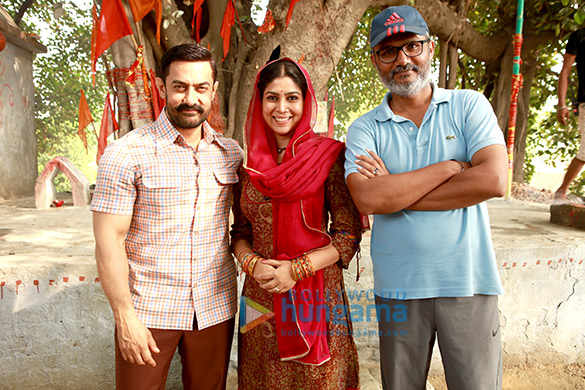
Tanwar on the sets of Dangal, with actor Aamir Khan and director Nitesh Tiwari

Tanwar returned to Hindi films with Dangal (2016), where she portrayed Daya Kaur, wife of former wrestler Mahavir Singh Phogat opposite Aamir Khan. Anupama Chopra said in her review that Tanwar provides "strong support" to the story. While, Sukanya Verma found her to be terrific. The film was a major commercial success with an estimated gross of ₹2,000 crore and became the highest-grossing Indian film ever.

In 2017, Tanwar made her web debut with Karrle Tu Bhi Mohabbat, playing a doctor opposite Ram Kapoor. In 2018, she returned to television with Tyohaar Ki Thaali. Tanwar then went onto play a priest's wife opposite Sunny Deol in Mohalla Assi (2018), a police officer's wife opposite Manoj Bajpayee in Dial 100 (2021) and Jayachandra's wife opposite Ashutosh Rana in Samrat Prithviraj (2022). In 2019, she appeared in two web series: The Final Call as an air controller officer and M.O.M. - Mission Over Mars as a scientist.

Later in 2022, Tanwar played a grieving mother who take revenge for her daughter's death in the series Mai: A Mother's Rage. Nandini Ramnath of Scroll.in noted, "Tanwar, cast against type, admirably interprets her character to the best of her abilities. She brings softness and empathy to an increasingly violent and profanity-ridden saga of vigilante justice." The series earned her nomination at Filmfare OTT Award for Best Actress – Drama Series and won her the Best Actress Critics – Drama Series.

In 2024, Tanwar played a coaching institute teacher in the film Sharmajee Ki Beti. Monika Rawal Kukreja called her performance "earnest" and added, "She brings the perfect balance while emoting strength and vulnerability". In 2025, Tanwar played a royal queen in the series The Royals. Pallavi Keswani of The Hindu stated that she brings more to the table despite limited screentime.

== Personal life ==
In 2018, Sakshi became a single mother when she adopted a nine-month-old baby girl, Dityaa Tanwar.

== Other work and media image ==
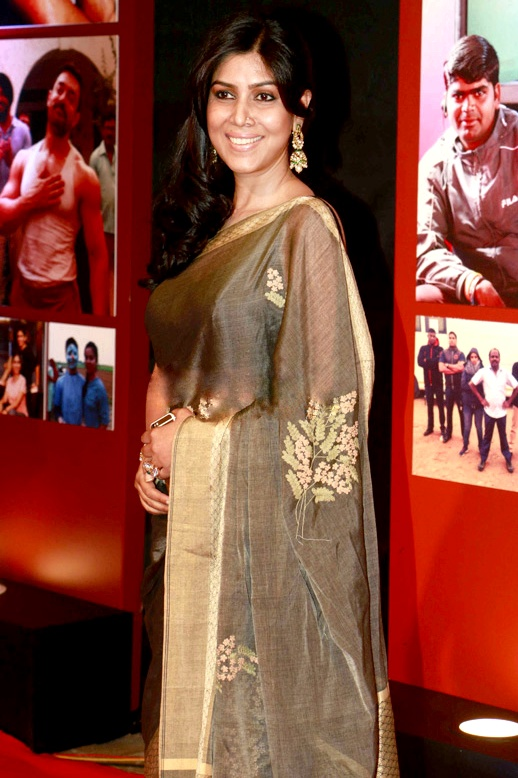
Tanwar at Dangal's success party in 2017

With her performances in Kahaani Ghar Ghar Kii, Kutumb, Devi and Bade Achhe Lagte Hain, Tanwar established herself among the leading and highest-paid actresses of Hindi television. Rediff.com placed her first in its "Top TV stars of 2006" and tenth in its "Top 10 television actresses" list. Supriya Sharma of India Today termed her the "nation's most-loved telly star". Tanwar is termed as one of the hottest television actress by Rediff.com. In 2022, Forbes India included her in its first ever "Showstoppers – India's Top 50 Outperformers" list.

In 2012, Tanwar appeared in Forbes India's Celebrity 100 list, ranking 93rd with an estimated annual income of ₹34.5 million (US$360,000). Her on-screen pairing with Ram Kapoor was voted as "Television's most popular onscreen couple", in an India Today survey. In April 2013, in a survey conducted by Ormax Media, Tanwar featured in the "Top 5 most trustworthy celebrities" list. In a 2014 poll conducted by Shaadi.com, Tanwar and Kapoor were voted the Favourite TV Couple by 42.3% Indians. Tanwar is also a celebrity endorser for brands and products such as Vim, Harpic, Tanishq, Kellogg's and Big Bazaar. Economic Times termed her the "second-most visible celebrity on television", in 2016.

== Filmography ==
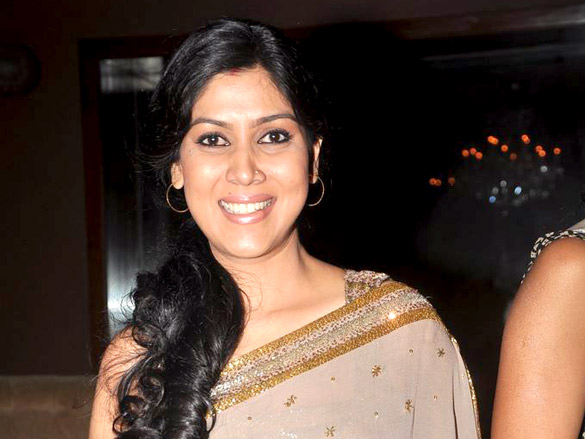
Sakshi Tanwar at the success bash of The Dirty Picture

=== Television ===
Year	Show	Role	Notes	Ref(s)
1999	Lalia	Lalia		Telefilm
1999	Albela Sur Mela	Presenter		
2000–2008	Kahaani Ghar Ghar Kii	Parvati Agarwal / Swati Dixit/ Janki Devi Dixit	Main role	
2001	Kaun Banega Crorepati	Contestant		
2001–2002	Kutumb	Maya Mittal		
2002–2004	Devi	Gayatri Vikram Sharma	Main role	
2004	Jassi Jaisi Koi Nahin	Indira Bhargav		
2005	Kaun Banega Crorepati 2	Contestant		
2005	Koffee with Karan	Guest		
2008	Bawandar	Guest		
2008	Kahaani Hamaaray Mahaabhaarat Ki	Ganga		
2009	Coffee House	Guest		
2010	Crime Patrol 2	Co-Presenter		
2010	Balika Vadhu	Teepri	Cameo	
2011–2014	Bade Achhe Lagte Hain	Priya Sharma Kapoor	Main role	
2012–2013	Kaun Banega Crorepati 6	Contestant	2 episodes	
2013	Ek Thhi Naayika	Pooja	Main role	
2014	Main Naa Bhoolungi	Narator		
2015	Code Red	Presenter / Narator		
2016	24: Season 2	Shivani Malik	Main role	
2017	Tyohaar Ki Thaali	Presenter		
2022	Bade Achhe Lagte Hain 2	Sheel Chaudhary	Guest	

=== Films ===
Year	Title	Role	Notes	Ref.
2006	O re Manva	Sandhya		
2008	C Kkompany	Television actress	Cameo appearance	
2009	Coffee House	Kavita		
2011	Aatankwadi Uncle	Sumitra		
2011	Bawra Mann	Pallavi		
2015	Katyar Kaljat Ghusali	Nabila	Marathi film	
2016	Dangal	Daya Kaur		
2018	Mohalla Assi	Savitri		
2021	Dial 100	Prerna Sood	ZEE5 film	
2022	Samrat Prithviraj	Jayachandra's wife		
2024	Sharmajee Ki Beti	Jyoti Sharma	Amazon Prime film	

=== Web series ===
Year	Title	Role	Ref.
2017–2019	Karrle Tu Bhi Mohabbat	Dr. Tripurasundari "Tipsy" Nagrajan	
2019	The Final Call	ATC Kiran Mirza	
2019	Mission Over Mars	Nandita Hariprasad	
2022–present	Mai: A Mother's Rage	Sheel Chaudhary	
2025	The Royals	Maharani Padmaja Singh	

=== Web-short film ===
Year	Title	Role	Channel
2020	Ghar Ki Murgi	Seema	Sony LIV

== Accolades ==
Tanwar has won two Indian Television Academy Awards — ITA Milestone Award for Kahaani Ghar Ghar Kii and ITA Award for Best Actress - Drama for Bade Achhe Lagte Hain.
