= Indian Telly Awards =

Annual award

- Previous: 19th Indian Telly Awards
- Awarded for: Excellence in Hindi Television
- Country: India
- First award: 2001; 25 years ago
- Website: Indian Telly Awards

Television/radio coverage
- Network: Star Plus (2001–04); Sony TV (2005–09); Colors TV (2010–14) &TV (2015–18); ZEE5 (2019–present)

The Indian Telly Awards is an annual awards ceremony that honors excellence of Hindi-language television. It was conceptualised and created by Anil Wanvari.

== History ==
For the first three years, The Indian Telly Awards were aired on Indian Hindi general entertainment channel Star Plus (2001–2003). From 2004 to 2009, Sony Entertainment Television was the home of The Indian Telly Awards with the channel commissioning Indiantelevision.com to produce it and acquiring the content to air on its channel Sony. Since its 10th edition, the awards ceremony moved to Viacom 18 Hindi general entertainment channel Colors TV. &TV took over the broadcasting rights, starting the fourteenth edition.

The Indian Telly Awards were first presented on 6 July 2001.

TV and film actor Alyy Khan hosted the first awards, held at the Oberoi Trident hotel in Mumbai. Actors Bhakti Barve and Jatin Kanakia received posthumous awards. In 2001 and 2003, the awards were hosted by television Actor Ram Kapoor & his wife Gautami Kapoor.

Television actors Ram Kapoor and Roshni Chopra hosted the 2007 awards. In 2008 the awards were anchored by Cyrus Broacha and Mini Mathur. The 2009 awards were hosted by Vishal Malhotra and Mona Singh. In 2010, the Awards were hosted by Ronit Roy and Meghna Malik. The 11th Indian Telly Awards, held in the year 2012, were hosted by Ronit Roy & Ram Kapoor and co-hosted by Manish Paul & Roshni Chopra. In the year 2013, 12th Indian Telly Awards were once again hosted by Ronit Roy and Ram Kapoor and co-hosted by Rashmi Desai, Kavita Kaushik.

== Popular awards ==
- Indian Telly Award for Fan Favorite Actor
- Indian Telly Award for Fan Favorite Actress
- Indian Telly Award for Fan Favorite Show
- Indian Telly Award for Fan Favorite Jodi
- Indian Telly Award for Fan Favorite Supporting Actor
- Indian Telly Award for Fan Favorite Supporting Actress
- Indian Telly Award for Fan Favorite Negative Actor
- Indian Telly Award for Fan Favorite Negative Actress
- Indian Telly Award for Fan Favorite Child Artist Female
- Indian Telly Award for Fan Favorite Child Artist Male
- Indian Telly Award for Fan Favorite TV Personality of the Year

== Jury awards ==
- Indian Telly Award for Best Television Personality of the Year
- Indian Telly Award for Best Actor in a Lead Role
- Indian Telly Award for Best Actress in a Lead Role
- Indian Telly Award for Best Onscreen Couple
- Indian Telly Award for Best Actor in a Comic Role
- Indian Telly Award for Best Actress in a Comic Role
- Indian Telly Award for Fresh New Face – Male
- Indian Telly Award for Fresh New Face – Female
- Indian Telly Award for Best Actor in a Supporting Role
- Indian Telly Award for Best Actress in a Supporting Role
- Indian Telly Award for Best Actor in a Negative Role
- Indian Telly Award for Best Actress in a Negative Role
- Indian Telly Award for Best Child Artiste – Male
- Indian Telly Award for Best Child Artiste – Female
- Indian Telly Award for Best Drama Series
- Indian Telly Award for Best Game Show
- Indian Telly Award for Best Reality Show
- Indian Telly Award for Best Anchor

== Technical awards ==
- These awards are given for specific skills which help enhance – or set new standards of technical quality of a TV programme, be it in the area of cinematography, editing, costume or what have you. An individual or team from a production house/post production house which has excelled in this specific aspect during the specific period can be nominated.
- TC 1 -Special/Visual Effects for Television
- TC 2 – Art Direction (Fiction)
- TC 3 – Art Direction (Non-Fiction)
- TC 4 – Videography (Best TV Cameraman – Fiction)
- TC 5 – Videography (Best TV Cameraman – Non – Fiction)
- TC 6 – Costumes for a TV Programme
- TC 7 – Make Up Artist
- TC 8 – Stylist
- TC 9 – TV Show Packaging (Fiction)
- TC 10 – TV Show Packaging (Non-Fiction) On an Entertainment Channel
- TC 11 – TV Channel Packaging (Including Channel Ids & Generic Promos)
- TC 12 – Editor (Fiction)
- TC 13 – Editor (Non-Fiction)
- TC 14 – Background Music for a TV Programme (Fiction)
- TC 15 – TV Lyricist
- TC 16 – Music Director
- TC 17 – Title Singer for a TV Show
- TC 18 – Director (Soap & Drama)
- TC 19 – Director (Sitcom)
- TC 20 – Director (Thriller)
- TC 21 – Director (Non- Fiction)
- TC 22 – Screenplay Writer (Drama Series & Soap)
- TC 23 – Dialogue Writer (Drama Series & Soap)
- TC 24 – Sitcom/Comedy Writer
- TC 25 – Story Writer
- TC 26 – Scriptwriter (Non Fiction)
- TC 27 – Choreographer

== Programming awards ==
- Programming awards will be presented to television software producers and channel executives for programmes of various genres.
- PR 1 -Edutainment / Science / Knowledge Based Show
- PR 2 -Entertainment News Show on an Entertainment Channel
- PR 3 -Public Service Programme
- PR 4 -Lifestyle & Fashion Show
- PR 5 -Talk Show on an Entertainment Channel
- PR 6 -Cookery show
- PR 7 -Sports Show
- PR 8 -Travel Show
- PR 9 -Health & Fitness Show

== See also ==
- List of Asian television awards
- 11th Indian Telly Awards
