= Food reality television =

Genre of reality television

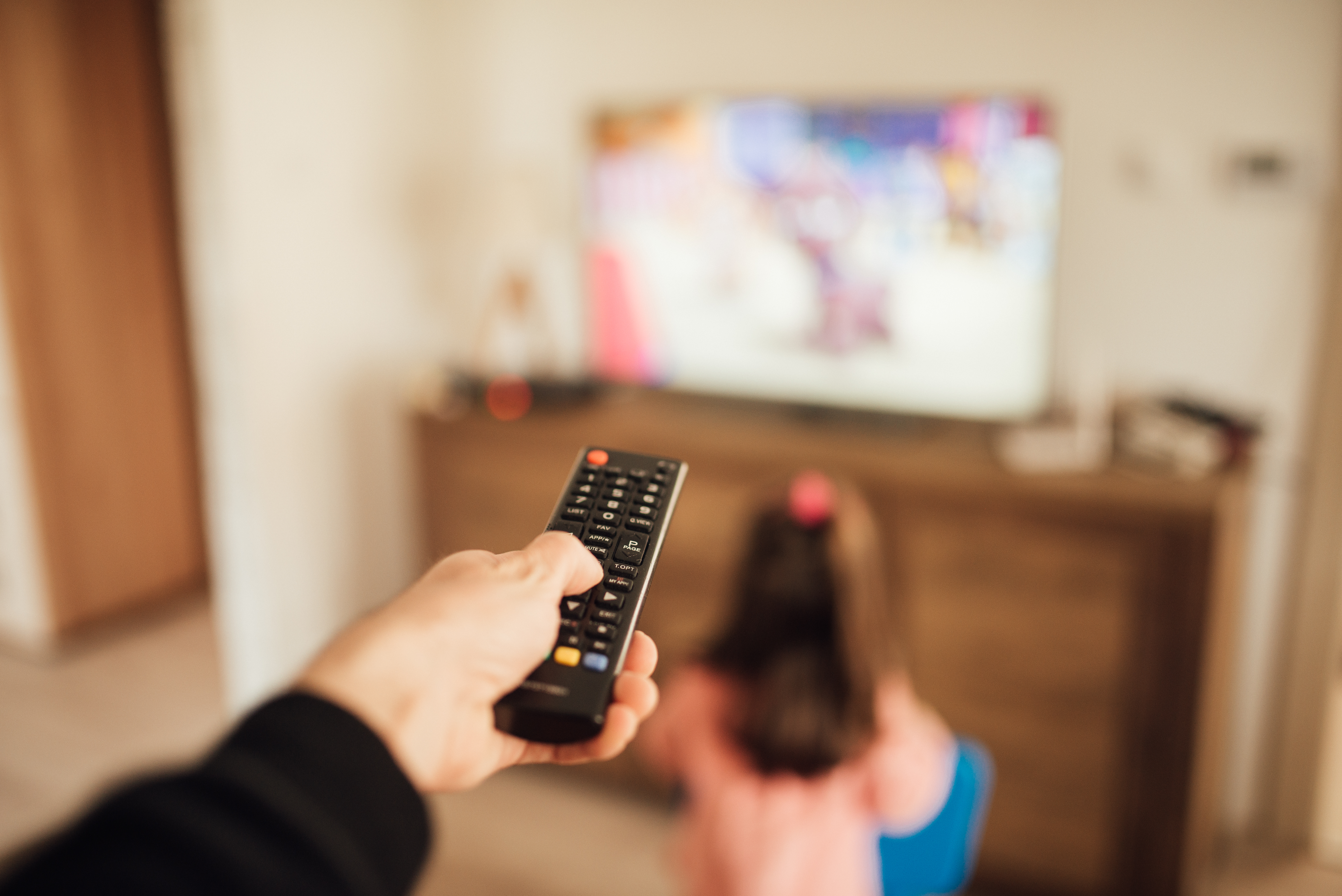
- An adult and child watching television
- Stylistic origins: Food reality television evolved from domestic advice programmes and cooking segments heard on radio, live demonstrations performed in supermarkets and column's of domestic advice in women's magazines.
- Cultural origins: The United States
- Features: Food reality television deals exclusively with food. Programming considers the production, consumption and sociocultural impact of food.
- Popularity: Broadcast television offers viewers a minimum of 12 hours of designated food programming each week

Subgenres
- Documentary-style, Adventure-travel, Game show and Cooking-as-lifestyle

Related genres
- Drama, Documentary, Comedy, Game show, Reality television

Related topics
- Sociology, Psychology, Television Studies

Food reality television is a genre of reality television programming that considers the production, consumption and/or sociocultural impact of food.

Reality food television emerged as a recognisable sub-genre in the 1940s. Historically, food reality television sought to educate viewers on matters of food. Early programmes such as Elsie Presents, The Diane Lucas Show and Cook's Night Out imparted 'specific, practical skills' on the viewer, and provided ad-lib commentary on matters of homemaking, home entertaining and motherhood. As the genre evolved, and the Food Network channel launched, food reality television sought also to entertain. Programmes such as Great Chefs, Boiling Point and A Cook's Tour combined the factual information of their ancestors with the personal and confessional nature of unscripted television. 'Delia's "how to cook" gave way to Nigella and Jamie's "how to live" This 'factual entertainment' function has persisted and unifies food reality television's contemporary subgenres. These subgenres include documentary-style, adventure-travel, game show and cooking-as-lifestyle.

According to critics, food reality television has had a significant impact on food production and consumption behaviours. Food reality television has been linked to a decline in culinary practice in the home, the development of culinary taste and the transition of food from 'necessity' to 'hobby'.

Food reality television has been praised by critics for creating opportunities for 'real people' and removing barriers to healthy eating. Food reality television has been criticised for its inescapability, and promotion of overconsumption.

== History ==
Food related entertainment, like other lifestyle consumer goods, is susceptible to changes in taste and consumer demand. Since its inception in the post-war period, food reality television has evolved from the occasional instructional programme to an abundant and wide-ranging genre.

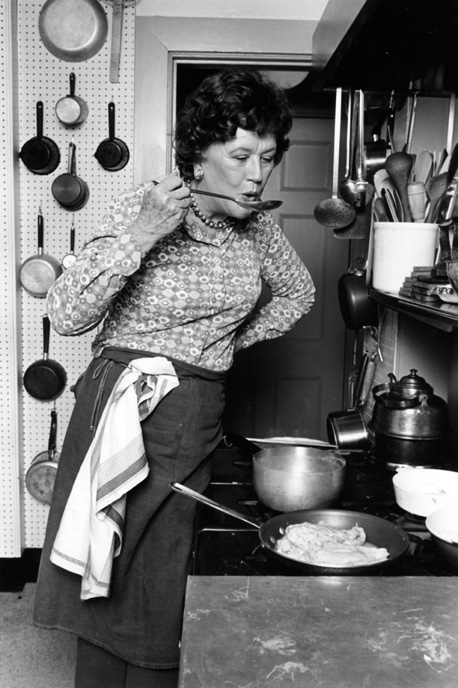
American chef and television host, Julia Child, in her kitchen

=== 1930–1960 ===
Food reality television evolved from cooking segments heard on the radio and homemaking advice offered in women's magazines. Early programmes were considered ‘educational’ in the sense that they prepared the predominately female viewership for their domestic and homemaking duties. Television hosts performed skills and techniques that may have been difficult to learn by listening to the cooking segment of the radio, watching live demonstrations in supermarkets or reading magazines. Television directors used close up shots to aid the education process and showcase the real-time cooking process. Early studio sets were constructed to resemble middle-class home kitchens. Studio kitchens were fit with appliances, cabinets and counters, kitchenware and occasionally, running water. Television hosts such as Diane Lucas, Margaret Fulton and Edith Green were positioned as ‘ordinary housewives’. According to de Solier, they were relatable and personable. They entertained viewers with stories of the men in their lives, their children, everyday social relations and the identifiable struggle of having ‘much to do and so little time to do it’. They adopted a warm and conversational tone, as if they were neighbours, sisters or close friends. The act of cooking was presented as laborious. Television hosts imparted family-pleasing recipes and time saving techniques on the audience in an attempt to reduce their daily load.

=== 1960–1980 ===
Following the 1960s, food reality television saw an increasing number of hosts with the intimacy and familiarity of their predecessors, but with newfound celebrity status and expertise. Examples include Delia Smith, Julia Child and Fanny Craddock. According to Kathleen Collins, these hosts rejected the family-pleasing and time-saving recipes of previous programmes. Instead, they offered viewers more elaborate and time-consuming recipes. Lori Brost states that television hosts presented cooking as an art form that was worthy of time and attention, rather than a chore to rush through.

=== 1980–2000 ===
Food reality television exploded and diversified during this period. The number and variety of programmes and audiences increased. Out-of-studio and adventure-travel programmes began to emerge during this period. The ‘reality’ nature of programming was heightened by the introduction of popular music tracks, handheld cameras, and observational and voyeuristic style framing. The explosion of the food reality television genre has been linked to the launch of the Food Network. The Food Network was the first cable network to deal exclusively with food. The Food Network has also been credited with changing the direction of programming from a didactic format to an entertainment-driven format.

=== 2000–present ===
The food reality television genre has adapted to meet the needs of the post network era. The post-network era has altered the way in which food reality television is produced and promoted and, the manner in which viewers engage with content. A rise in on-demand services and mobile device viewing have provided viewers with greater access to international food programming. In the post-network era, audiences are smaller and homogenous, programming is nicher and content is available to view at the audience's convenience. Short-form content has proliferated in the post-network era, with platforms such as YouTube and TikTok catering to viewer demand for snackable and shareable entertainment. Views for food-related content, such as recipes, food diaries and cooking demonstrations, have increased 170% year-over-year on YouTube. Videos with the hashtag #TikTokFood have conjointly accumulated 25.2 billion views on TikTok.

== Subgenres ==
Food reality television is a diverse genre that encompasses a variety of different entertainment programmes. These programmes can be classified into subgenres according to their dominant features and styles. According to scholarly consensus, food reality television's subgenres include documentary-style, adventure-travel, game shows and cooking-as-lifestyle.

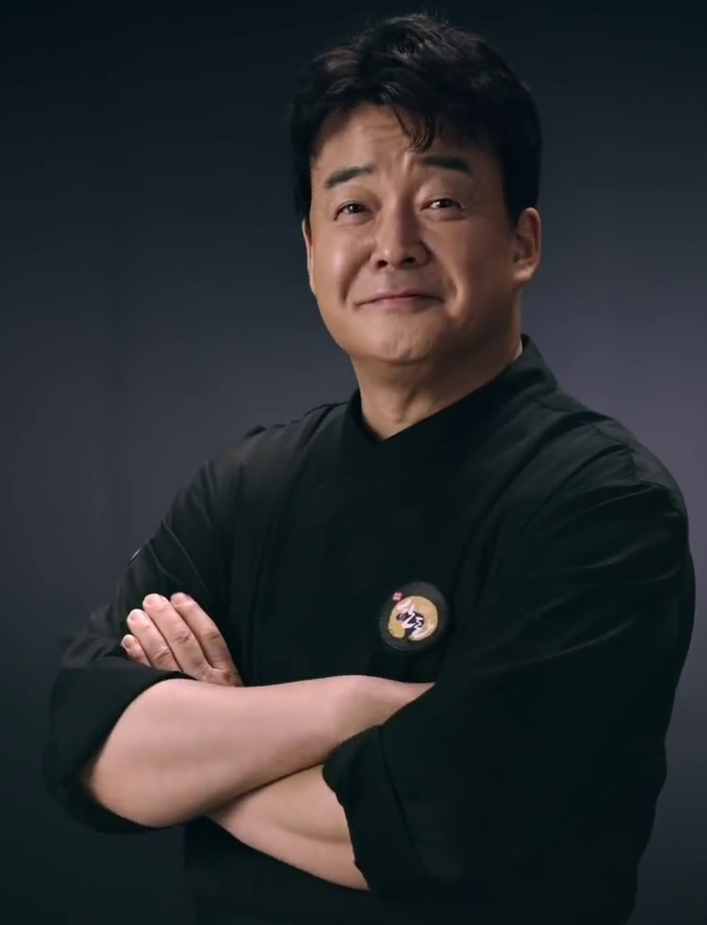
South Korean chef and television host, Baek Jong-won

=== Documentary-style ===
Food reality television's documentary-style subgenre is characterised by its 'hard value of information and realism'. Participants are 'real people' with a relationship to food, programmes are filmed in natural living, working and educational environments and events evolve naturally, from narrative contexts. Leaning on their expertise, the television host transmits cultural and health knowledge to the participants and viewing public. Documentary-style programmes often emphasise the personal transformation and subsequent success of the documentary participant. Examples of documentary-style programmes include 4 Wheeled Restaurant, Baek Jong-won's Food Truck, Chef School, Food Inc., Grandma's Restaurant in Samcheuong-dong, Jamie’s School Dinners, Ramsay’s Kitchen Nightmares and Super Size Me.

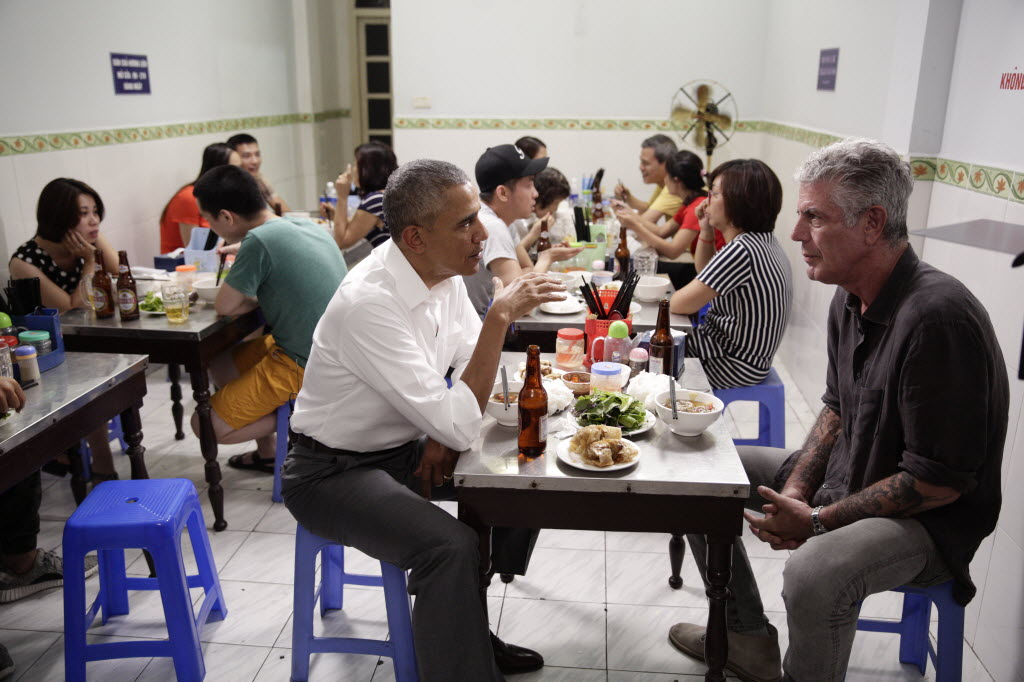
Former President, Barack Obama (left), with American chef, Anthony Bourdain (right), at Bún cha Huong Lien Restaurant in Hanoi, Vietnam – S8 E1 of Parts Unknown

=== Adventure-travel ===
Food reality television's adventure-travel subgenre focusses on foreign and exotic food experiences. Adventure-travel programmes are often shot on location and are hosted by chefs or food critics. The host 'strays away from the normal culinary path' in search of the most exotic food experiences possible. In the non-cooking segments, adventure-travel programmes present images of communities in ways that emphasise their uniqueness and cultural richness. The natural landscape, local accents, local produce and community feasts are often accentuated. Programmes typically feature trips to street vendors and food markets, home cooked meals and restaurant crawls with local guides. Examples of adventure-travel programmes include A Cook’s Tour, Bizarre Foods, Diners, Drive-Ins and Dives, Elizabeth Chong’s tiny delights, Gourmet and Man v. Food.

=== Game show ===
Food reality television's game show subgenre is characterised by its competition format. Participants, amateur or professional, compete in culinary challenges with a rigid set of guidelines and a time limit. The participants are often focussed on defeating the other participants and obtaining the cash prize. Charley Packham states that game show programmes borrow heavily from the sporting genre. The competitiveness and rivalry of participants is emphasised by the starting line up of participants and judges, the wide angle shots, running commentary and participant testimonials. The ratings of participants are often based on the taste, innovativeness and presentation of their culinary creations. At the end of the episode, the ratings are totalled, and the winner is announced. Examples of game show programmes include Can’t Cook, Won’t Cook, Chopped, Come Dine with Me, Cook Representative, Dotch Cooking Show, Go Fridge, Iron Chef and MasterChef.

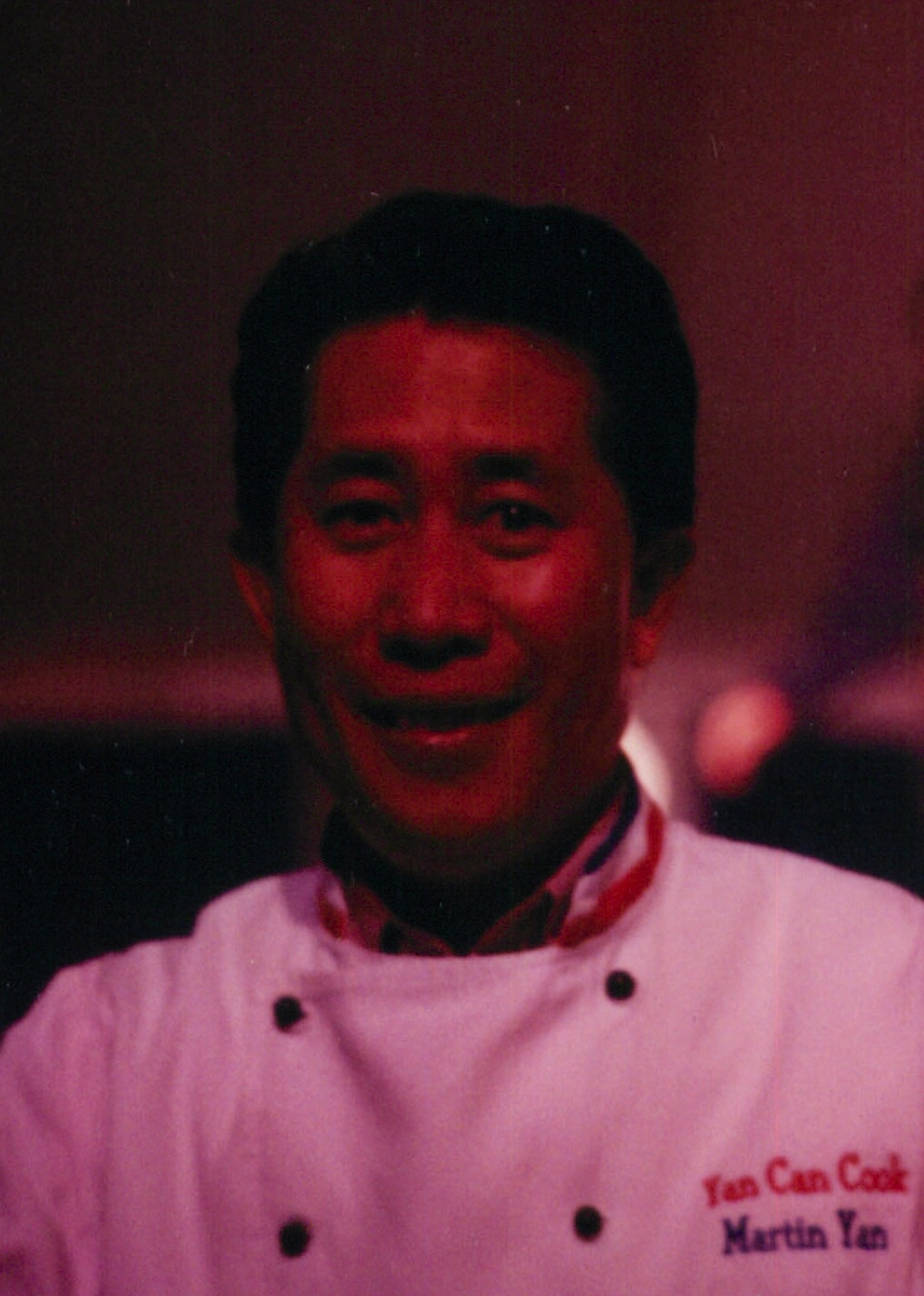
Hong Kong chef and television host, Martin Yan

=== Cooking-as-lifestyle ===
Food reality television's cooking-as-lifestyle subgenre celebrates food preparation, cooking and eating. Cooking-as-lifestyle programmes emphasise the sensuous qualities of food. Food and hospitality are presented as luxurious, indulgent and gratifying consumption activities. Sandie Randall states that 'food is presented and handled in ways which are very tactile'. Close up shots of chefs preparing raw ingredients, extreme close up shots of sauces being poured and accompanying descriptions of taste and smell, ‘it’s so rich and warm’/ ‘the smell is just wonderful’, aim to evoke pleasure in the viewer. Cooking-as-lifestyle programmes position cooking as an enjoyable and satisfying activity for the chef themselves. Cooking-as-lifestyle programmes often end on a communal meal, on themes of family, friendship and connectedness. The chef is often presented as 'having a good time'. They are frequently captured laughing, cracking jokes and enjoying the fruits of their culinary labour. Examples of cooking-as-lifestyle programmes include Chef's Table, Cooking with Dog, Essence of Emeril, Huey's Cooking Adventures, My Family Feast, The Naked Chef, Raja Rasoi Aur Anya Kahaniyaan and Yan Can Cook.

== Social and cultural impact ==
=== The ubiquity of food reality television ===
Food reality television has come to occupy a central role in popular culture. Broadcast television offers viewers a minimum of 12 hours of designated food programming each week. Entire television channels are dedicated to food programming. Australia has Lifestyle Food, Canada has the Cooking Channel, China has China Food TV, France has Cuisine TV, Italy has Alice, the United Kingdom and Ireland have Good Food and the United States has the Food Network. The rise of streaming services, such as Netflix, Prime Video and Stan, and social media networks such as YouTube and TikTok, have provided viewers with greater access to international food programming. The seemingly unlimited range of food programming has given rise to the modern phenomenon of binge-watching. Isabelle de Solier states that ‘it is now possible to watch food television all day, every day’. According to Ampere Analysis, Chinese, American, Mexican and Argentinian viewers the most likely binge-watch programmes, with over 60% of each nation's television audience stating that they frequently watch multiple episodes of the same programme back-to-back.

=== The decline in culinary practice ===
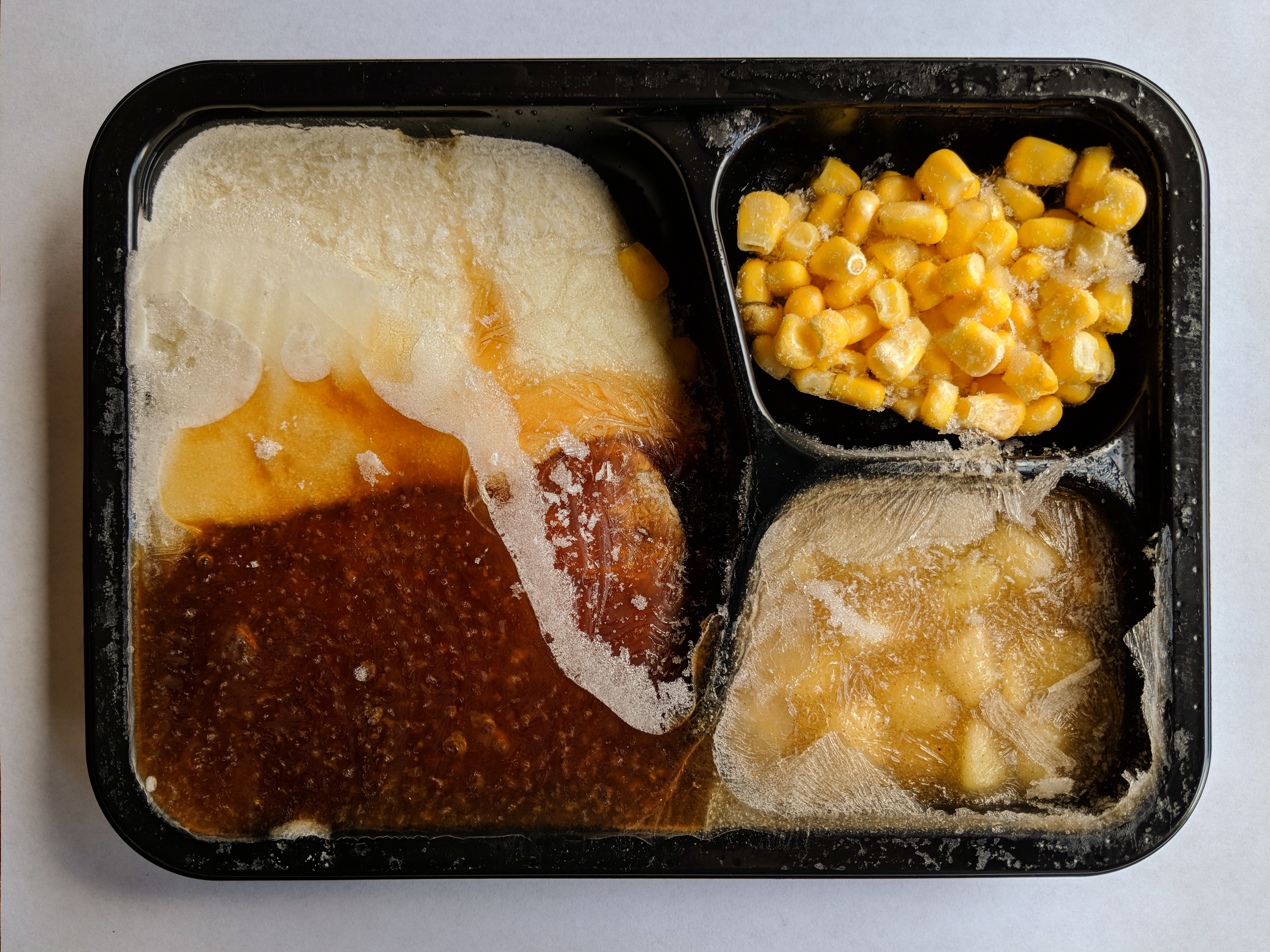
Frozen TV dinner

Food reality television has been associated with a decline in culinary practice. Lizzy Pope states that a decreasing number of Americans are cooking in their homes. According to Eliane Glaser, 'only one in five viewers tries a recipe after watching a chef on TV and only one in seven buys new ingredients’. Michael Pollan states that cooking has shifted from an obligation to a spectator sport. The act of cooking appears to have been replaced by the act of viewing. Anthony Bourdain likens food programming to pornography, stating that viewers watch people do things that they have no intention of doing themselves. Contemporary food programming separates the viewer from the realities of cooking. Food writer, Matthew Fort, states that viewers turn on their televisions, tune out and defrost their frozen pizzas. According to Kate Frost, audiences are happy watching celebrity chefs create ‘elaborate dishes from fresh, exotic ingredients, while their own plastic-packaged supermarket ready-meals circle sweatily for three minutes in the microwave’. Viewers devour televisual offerings in place of the sustenance of real food.

=== The development of culinary taste ===
Food reality television has been attributed to the development of culinary taste. According to Isabelle de Solier, food programming 'educates in aesthetics' and imparts 'pragmatic culinary knowledge' on the viewer. Food reality television provides viewers with essential culinary knowledge and taste knowledge of 'ideological food preferences'. Food reality television has democratised dining out and provided viewers with the skills and taste knowledge necessary to participate intelligently and impress others. Isabelle de Solier states that food reality television can be understood as a form of fruitful leisure, as viewers invest their spare time in acquiring 'culinary cultural capital' and bettering themselves with culinary knowledge.

== Praise and criticism ==
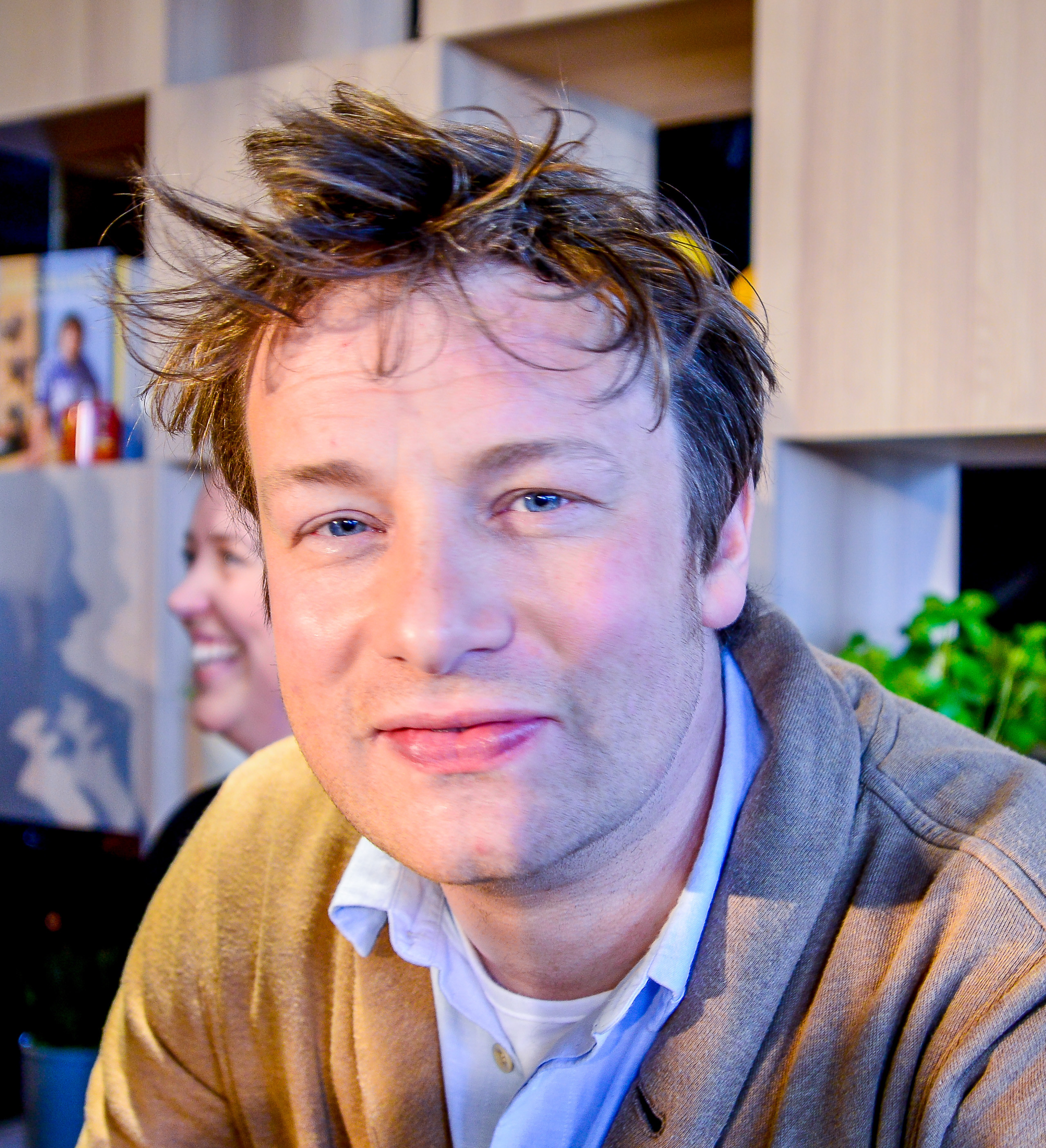
Celebrity chef and television host, Jamie Oliver

=== Praise ===
Food reality television is praised for spotlighting small businesses, showcasing real talent and, providing non-actors with the opportunity to tell their stories. Food reality television is also praised for removing barriers to healthy eating. Samantha Lane states that 'celebrity chefs promote basic cooking practices, which could address obstacles such as lack of skills and lack of confidence with a range of ingredients'. Jamie Oliver and Iain Hewitson have both been praised for providing viewers the recipes and skills necessary to cook healthy, affordable and family-friendly meals. Food reality television has also been praised for bringing topical food issues, such as sustainability, obesity and ethical practices, to light. Casey Ryan Kelly praises food reality television for its preoccupation with foodways, as this sheds necessary light on the social, cultural and economic practices associated with food production and consumption.

=== Criticism ===
Food reality television is criticised for its promotion of overconsumption. According to Lilian Cheung, repeated exposure to junk food and beverage marketing and the mindless eating associated with binge-watching television, creates unhealthy eating habits. Amy R. Eisner-Levine states that viewer entertainment is derived from watching people fit giant sandwiches in their mouths, rejoice over a mouthful of rich pasta and scoff six-pound burritos in no time at all. Insufficient attention is given to the negative health effects of televised food. Amy R. Eisner-Levine states that 'the larger, the fattier, the sweeter and the greasier the food is, the more it is deemed desirable’. Lizzy Pope states that the overconsumption portrayed in food reality television may validate unhealthy eating behaviours and set cultural norms. According to Nancy Lee, celebrity chefs encourage audiences to aspire to their indulgent lifestyle aesthetics. Lizzy Pope states that watching TV hosts prepare and consume indulgent and enormous dishes might set cultural norms. Food reality television is criticised for its inescapability. The plethora of food programming is unavoidable. According to Joan C. Henderson, the proliferation of food programming could leave the viewer disenchanted and bored. Annette Hill holds viewers liable for the explosion of food reality television, stating that viewers create demand for food programming and, justify its existence.

== List of programmes ==
- 4 Wheeled Restaurant (Korea)
- Ace of Cakes (U.S.)
- Ainsley Harriott's Street Food (UK)
- Anjum's Australian Spice Stories (Australia)
- Baek Jong-won's Alley Restaurant (Korea)
- Baek Jong-won's Top 3 Chef King (Korea)
- Baek Jong-won's Food Truck (Korea)
- Bake Squad (U.S.)
- Baking Impossible (U.S.)
- Best Baker in America (U.S.)
- Bizarre Foods (U.S.)
- Bread, Love and Dreams (Korea)
- Cake Boss (U.S.)
- Can't Cook, Won't Cook (UK)
- Chef & My Fridge (Korea)
- Chef School (Canada)
- Chef's Table (U.S.)
- Chinese Food Made Easy (UK)
- Chopped (U.S.)
- The Chopping Block (U.S.)
- Ciao Italia (U.S.)
- Coffee Friends (Korea)
- Cook's Night Out (UK)
- Cook Representative (Korea)
- Cool Guys, Hot Ramen (Korea)
- Come Dine with Me (UK)
- A Cook's Tour (U.S.)
- Cooking with Dog (Japan)
- Crazy Recipe Adventure (Korea)
- Crime Scene Kitchen (U.S.)
- Cucina Sicilia (Italy)
- Daily Cooks Challenge (UK)
- Delicious Rendezvous (Korea)
- Destination Flavour (Australia)
- Diners, Drive-Ins and Dives (U.S.)
- Dinner: Impossible (U.S.)
- Dotch Cooking Show (Japan)
- Eating History (Italy)
- Elizabeth Chong's Tiny Delights (Australia)
- Everyday Italian (U.S.)
- Fast Foodies (U.S.)
- Feast of the Gods (Korea)
- Fixing Dinner (Canada)
- Fluffy's Food Adventures (U.S.)
- Food Inc. (U.S.)
- Food Safari (Australia)
- Food Wars (U.S.)
- Fresh, Fried and Crispy (U.S.)
- Fresh Sunday (China)
- From My Ranch to Your Kitchen (Mexico)
- Fuck, That's Delicious (U.S.)
- Giallo Zafferano (Italy)
- Glutton for Punishment (U.S.)
- Gourmet (Korea)
- Gourmet Farmer (Australia)
- Go Fridge (China)
- Grandma's Restaurant in Samcheong-dong (Korea)
- The Great British Bake Off (UK)
- Great Chefs (USA)
- Great Chocolate Showdown (Canada)
- The Great Food Truck Race (U.S.)
- Hadaka no Shounen (Japan)
- Halloween Baking Championship (U.S.)
- Hell's Kitchen (U.S.)
- Hell's Kitchen (UK)
- Holiday Baking Championship (U.S.)
- Huey's Cooking Adventures (Australia)
- The Hungry and the Hairy (Korea)
- Iron Chef (Japan)
- Itihaas Ki Thaali Se (India)
- Jamie's Kitchen (UK)
- Jamie's School Dinners (UK)
- Kang's Kitchen (Korea)
- Katata Rahata (Sri Lanka)
- Kitchen Nightmares (U.S.)
- Kylie Kwong: Heart and Soul (Australia)
- La Frontera with Pati Jinich (Mexico)
- Land of Wine (Korea)
- Late Night Restaurant (Korea)
- Le Meilleur Patissier (France)
- Let's Eat (Korea)
- Lidia's Kitchen (U.S.)
- Luke Nguyen's Food Trail (Australia)
- Man v. Food (U.S.)
- Martin sur la route (France)
- MasterChef (UK)
- The Master of Revenge (Korea)
- Midnight Dinner (Japan)
- My Family Feast (Australia)
- Nigella Bites (UK)
- Noma Australia (Australia)
- Nugasewana Iwum PIhum (Sri Lanka)
- Pasta (Korea)
- Pasta Grannies (Italy)
- Pati's Mexican Table (Mexico)
- Pesadilla en la cocina (Spain)
- Poh & Co (Australia)
- The Naked Chef (UK)
- The Next Food Network Star (U.S.)
- Raja, Rasoi Aur Anya Kahaniyaan (India)
- Ramsay's Kitchen Nightmares (UK)
- Ready Steady Cook (Australia)
- Recipe for Success (U.S.)
- Restaurant: Impossible (U.S.)
- Restaurant Makeover (Canada)
- Samurai Gourmet (Japan)
- School of Chocolate (France)
- So Good (China)
- Spring Baking Championship (U.S.)
- Taste Hunter (HK)
- Throwdown! with Bobby Flay (U.S.)
- Top Chef (U.S.)
- Top Chef: Just Desserts (U.S.)
- Torres en la cocina (Spain)
- Will Work for Food (U.S.)
- Wok with Yan (Canada)
- Worst Bakers in America (U.S.)
- Worst Cooks in America (U.S.)
- Yan Can Cook (China)
- Yan Can Cook: Spice Sunday (China)
- You Gotta Eat Here! (Canada)
- Zumbo's Just Desserts (Australia)

== See also ==
- Category: Japanese cooking television series
- Category: South Korean cooking television series
- Celebrity chef
- Cooking
- Cooking show
- Eating
- Food
- Foodways
- List of cooking shows
- Reality television
- Television
