= Pushpesh Pant =

Indian food critic and historian

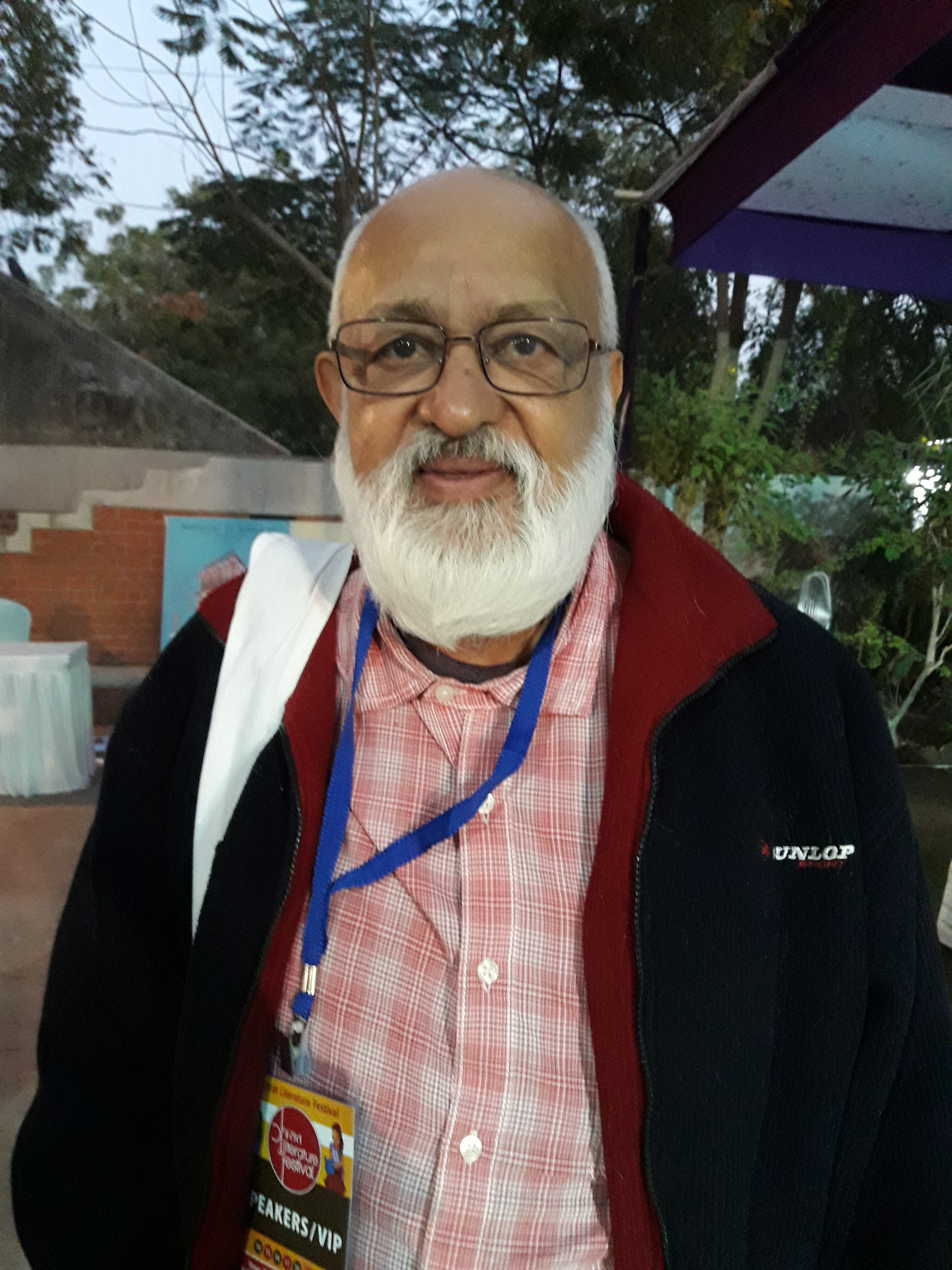
- at Gujarat Literature Festival Ahmedabad on 16 December 2016
- Born: 1946 (age 79–80); Mukteshwar, Uttarakhand
- Occupations: academic, food critic, food historian, international relation expert
- Known for: India: The Cookbook (2011) (book); Raja, Rasoi Aur Anya Kahaniyaan (2014) (TV series)
- Awards: Padma Shri (2016)

Pushpesh Pant (born 1946) is an Indian academic, food critic and historian. He retired as a professor of International relations from Jawaharlal Nehru University, Delhi. He is one of India's leading experts on International Relations as well as Indian cuisine, and as a columnist has written for a number of major publications like Forbes, Open, Outlook, Times of India and The Tribune.

His book, India: The Cookbook (2011), was named by The New York Times as one of the best cookbooks of the year.

Prof. Pant was also featured in Raja, Rasoi Aur Anya Kahaniyaan, an Indian television series on Indian cuisine available on The EPIC Channel. The series gives an inside look into the royal kitchens of India and also explores the history behind the cuisine of the Indian royals, showing how dishes were discovered, and their significance in Indian history.

He was also featured in an interview in The Australian.

The Government of India awarded him the Padma Shri in 2016.

== Books ==
Professor Pant has published on travel and tourism, with over a dozen books to his name.

- India: The Cookbook, ISBN 978-0714859026
- Gourmet Journeys in India
- Classic Cooking Of Punjab, with Jiggs Kalra. Allied Publishers, 2004, ISBN 81-7764-566-8.
- International Relations in 21st Century
