= Maleeka Ghai =

Indian Actress

- Born: Delhi, India
- Occupation: Actress,
- Years active: 1995–present

Maleeka Ghai is an Indian actress who is best recognized for her portrayal of television roles such as Gandhari in Dharmakshetra, Bhadrama in Chandrakanta, Aanchal Pandey in Desh Ki Beti Nandini, and Saraswati in Saraswatichandra. Ghai has also appeared in numerous Bollywood films such as Hum To Mohabbat Karega, Raja Ki Aayegi Baraat, Heeralal Pannalal, and Agniputra.

== Television ==
Year	Title	Role	Channel
2013	Desh Ki Beti Nandini	Aanchal Pandey	Sony TV
2013	Punar Vivah	-	Zee TV
2013	Balika Vadhu	Nirmala: matchmakers from Jaitsar village	Colors TV
2014	Dharmakshetra	Gandhari	The EPIC Channel & Netflix
2014	Meri Aashiqui Tum Se Hi	Madhvi	Colors TV
2014	Kismat Connection	-	Sahara One Entertainment
2014	Saraswatichandra	Saraswati	Star Plus
2016	D4 - Get Up and Dance	Kavita	Channel [V] India
2016	Shapath	Tantasvi	Life OK
2017	Chandrakanta	Bhadramaa	Colors TV
2017	Aarambh	Kanupriya	Star plus
2018	Navrangi Re!	Chirounji Devi	colors rishtey
2020	Mirasan	Batulan Bibi	Ullu App
2020	Pyar Ki Luka Chuppi	Bharti Yadav	Dangal TV
2021	Sahiba	Mother	
2021	Dhappa	Sangeeta	Hungama Play
2021–2022	Ziddi Dil Maane Na	Ammaji	Sony SAB
2022	Gupta Niwas	Suman Gupta	Watcho App
2022	Rajjo (TV series)	Jhilmil	Star plus
2023	Na Umra Ki Seema Ho	ACP Durga	Star Bharat
2023	Maitree (TV series)	Kamna	Zee TV
2024	Ekk Kudi Punjab Di	Rajwinder Kaur Atwal as Antagonist	zee tv
