= Tyohaar Ki Thaali =

- Starring: Sakshi Tanwar
- Country of origin: India
- Original language: Hindi
- No. of seasons: 2
- No. of episodes: 40

Production
- Running time: approx. 30 minutes

Original release
- Network: The EPIC Channel
- Release: 2017

Tyohaar Ki Thaali is an Indian television series that airs on The EPIC Channel and takes viewers through various festivals celebrated in India. Tyohaar Ki Thaali is a show that offers a delectable mix of stories and recipes hosted by Sakshi Tanwar. The show is also available on EPIC ON (EPIC TV's online video streaming platform).

== Show summary ==
Tyohaar Ki Thaali is a show that offers a delectable mix of stories and recipes hosted by Sakshi Tanwar. In this show, Sakshi Tanwar celebrates Indias's festivals by sharing her long cherished, heirloom recipes of various bhogs and prasads identified with the Gods. Peppered with folklores, legends and Sakshi's personal anecdotes.

== Show themes ==
- Episode 1 – Ganesh Chaturthi
- Episode 2 – Onam
- Episode 3 – Anant Chaturdashi
- Episode 4 – Eid al-Adha
- Episode 5 – Navratri
- Episode 6 – Dusshera
- Episode 7 – Karwa Chauth
- Episode 8 – Chhoti Diwali
- Episode 9 – Diwali
- Episode 10 – Chhath Puja
- Episode 11 – Karthik Purnima
- Episode 12 – Guru Nanak Jayanti
- Episode 13 – Satyanarayan Puja/Vrat
- Episode 14 – Ekadashi
- Episode 15 – Hanuman Vrat
- Episode 16 – Sankashti Chaturthi
- Episode 17 – Vrat Ka Khana
- Episode 18 – Paush Purnima
- Episode 19 – Christmas
- Episode 20 – New Year
- Episode 21 – Pongal
- Episode 22 – Makar Sankranti/Lohri
- Episode 23 – Vasant Panchami
- Episode 24 – Narad Stories
- Episode 25 – Kandoba and Folk Deities
- Episode 26 – Mahashivratri
- Episode 27 – Holi
- Episode 28 – Basoda
- Episode 29 – Gudi Padwa
- Episode 30 – Gangaur
- Episode 31 – Mahavir Jayanti
- Episode 32 – Easter
- Episode 33 – Baisaki
- Episode 34 – Akshaya Tritiya
- Episode 35 – Mopin Festival
- Episode 36 – Buddha Purnima
- Episode 37 - Sita
- Episode 38 - Shavuot
- Episode 39 - Ganga Dussehra
- Episode 40 - Sai Baba

== Guests ==
- Virender Sehwag
- Ram Kapoor
- Shweta Kawatra
- Kavita Kaushik
