= Chaturthi =

Fourth day of a lunar fortnight in the Hindu calendar

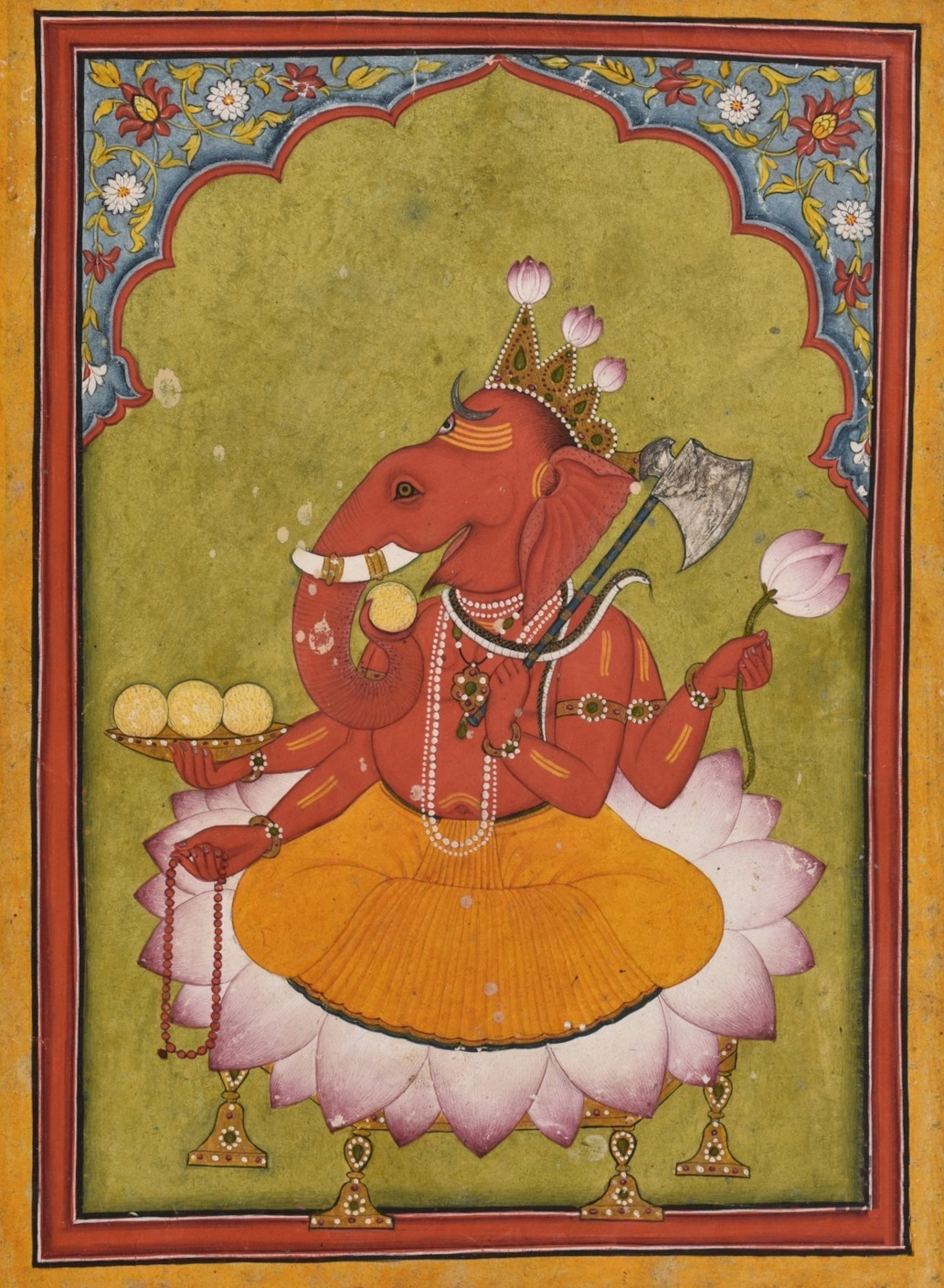
Chaturthi is associated with the worship of Hindu deity Ganesha (pictured).

Chaturthi (Sanskrit: चतुर्थी, romanized: Caturthī) refers to the fourth day of a lunar fortnight in the Hindu calendar.

== Festivals ==
- Karak Chaturthi (Karvā Chauth): It is celebrated on Chaturthī of Krishna Paksha (waning lunar phase) of Kārtika Month as per the Purnimanta calendar. During this vrata, Parvati and Shiva are worshipped, along with Kartikeya and Ganesha. The day is also known as Vakratunda Sankashti Chaturthi.
- Bahula Chaturthi (Bol Chauth): This Vrat is observed on Chaturthi of Krishna Paksha of Bhadrapada month as per Purnimanta calendar. The festival is characterized by worshiping Dhenu/Gau Mata (holy cows) & their calves and decorating them. The day is also known as Heramba Ganpati Sankashti Chaturthi.
- Sankashti Chaturthi is the Chaturthi (4th day) of the Krishna Paksha (waning lunar phase) after Purnima (full moon). If this Chaturthi falls on a Mangalvara (Tuesday) it is called Angarki Chaturthi. On this day, the devotees observe strict vrata (fast). They conclude the fast at night after having darshan (auspicious sighting) of the moon preceded by prayers to Ganesha. Devotees believe their wishes would be fulfilled if they pray on this auspicious day. The Ganapati Atharvashesha is recited to seek the blessings of Ganesha.

During each month, Ganesha is worshiped with a different name and peeta (lotus petals). On the Charturti day (4th day after new moon) of each month, the 'Sankashta Ganapathi Pooja' prayer is performed. Each ‘Vratha’ (strict fast) has a purpose and is explained to us by a story known as the ‘Vrata Katha’. This prayer offering has 13 Vrata Kathas, one for each month and the 13th story is for 'athika' (The Hindu calendar has one extra month every 4 years).

Month	Name of Ganesh in which the pooja is performed	Name of the peeta
Chaitra Masa	Vikata Maha Ganapati	Vinayaka Peeta
Vaishaka Masa	Chanakra Raja Ekadanta Ganapathi	Srichakra Peeta
Jeshta Masa	Krishna Pingala Maha Ganapati	Sri Shakthi Ganapathi Peeta
Ashada Masa	Gajanana Ganapati	Vishnu Peeta
Shravana Masa	Heramba Maha Ganapati	Ganapathi Peeta
Bhadrapada Masa	Vignaraja Maha Ganapati	Vigneshwara Peeta
Ashweeja Masa	Vakrathunda Maha Ganapati	Bhuvaneshwari Peeta
Karthika Masa	Ganadipa Maha Ganapati	Shiva Peeta
Margashira Masa	Akuratha Maha Ganapati	Durga Peeta
Pushya Masa	Lambodara Maha Ganapati	Soura Peeta
Maga Masa	Dvijapriya Maha Ganapati	Samanya deva Peeta
Palguna Masa	Balachandra Maha Ganapati	Agama Peeta
Adika Masa	Vibhuvana Palaka Maha Ganapati	Doorva Bilva Patra Peeta

- Vinayaka Chaturthi is the Chaturthi after Amavasya or new moon. Devotees observe the fast for full day and night and meal is consumed the next day.

This fast is mostly observed in Western and Southern India especially by the Brahmin community (Smarta or Shaiva). The fast is supposed to be strict and only fruit, roots or vegetable products are supposed to be consumed.

- Angarki Sankashti ChaturthiIs the 4th day of the waning lunar phase after the full moon.coming on Tuesday.
- Ganesh Chaturthi is one of prominent Chaturthi on which Ganesha makes his presence on the earth.
- Magha shukla chaturthi: Ganesh Jayanti
- Samvatsari (Kshamavani), falls on Shukla Paksha Bhadrapad.
- Nagula Chaviti
