= Nagula Chavithi =

Hindu festival

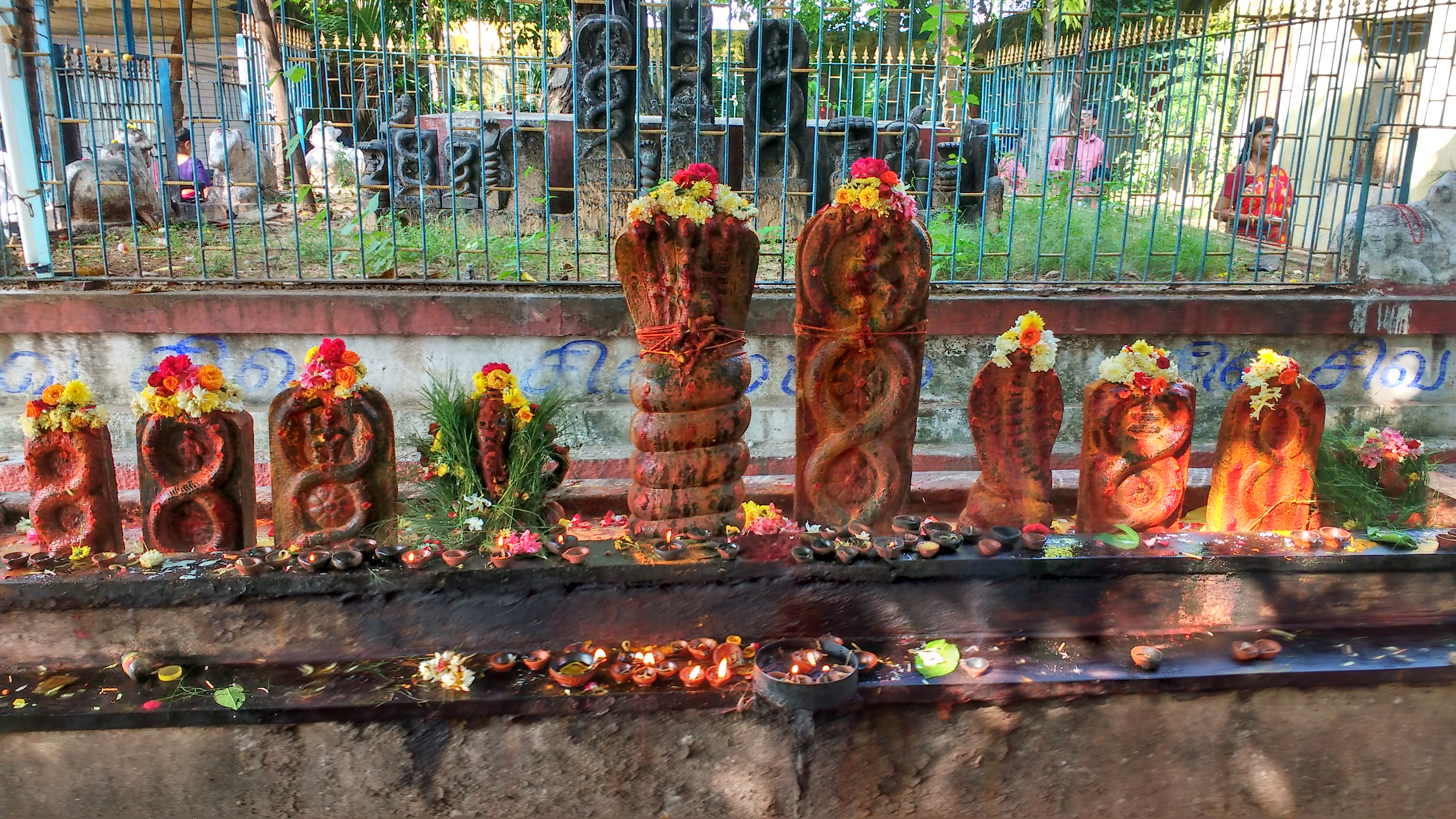
- Also called: నాగుల చవితి
- Observed by: Hindus
- Type: Hindu cultural and religious observance
- Celebrations: 1 day
- Observances: Worship of Nag Devatas (Serpent Gods) and snakes with milk and dry fruits
- Begins: Fourth day (Chaturthi) after Deepavali Amavasya during Karthika masam
- Date: October/November
- Related to: Nag Panchami, Diwali

Nagula Chavithi (Telugu: నాగుల చవితి) is a Hindu festival to worship Nag Devatas (Serpent Gods) on the fourth day (Chaturthi) after Deepavali Amavasya during the month of Karthika.

== Criticism from animal rights activists ==
Animal rights activists criticize this festival for propagating a regressive myth that snakes drink milk. "Snakes are not mammals. They are reptiles. Mammals can generally digest milk, and some, in fact, survive on it. For snakes, this is biologically impossible. Snakes in general can open three times the actual size of their mouth and consume prey directly. They just don't drink milk. But the charmers usually captured the snake, broke the fangs off of it (called defanging), stitched its mouth in the sides and left a hole in the front. After this, they starved the snakes for 30-45 days to the point of dehydration and brought it to the festival of Naga Panchami. People would offer various food items including milk, which to an extremely dehydrated snake with only one hole in its mouth, appears much like water to a person stranded in the desert. So it would lap it up." Animal rights activists point out that the milk that is wasted here is obtained from cruel practices in the dairy industry. Pouring milk in the snake pit will also cause problems for the snakes since, often, the pits are filled with milk.
