= Agniputra =

- Directed by: B. Vijay Reddy
- Written by: Anwar Khan
- Produced by: Jawahar Kaul
- Starring: Mithun Chakraborty; Vineetha; Shashikala; Asrani; Prem Chopra
- Music by: Nikhil-Vinay; Rajesh Roshan
- Production company: J. K. Movie Units
- Release date: 4 February 2000
- Running time: 125 minutes
- Country: India
- Language: Hindi

Agniputra is a 2000 Indian Hindi action revenge drama film directed by Vijay Reddy. It stars Mithun Chakraborty in the lead role.

== Plot ==
The story begins with Arjun working in a band with his family, consisting of three sisters and his widowed mother. Arjun falls in love with the daughter of an MLA, who was involved with his family. The police make a false accusation against Arjun and his sisters and accuse them of being sex workers. It turns out that the MLA is behind the case. His sisters end up being sexually assaulted by the MLA, and two of them end up committing suicide. Arjun decides to seek vengeance against the goons. and with some toil and foil he eventually outsmarts them.

== Cast ==
- Mithun Chakraborty as Arjun Dhanraj
- Vineetha as Shalu
- Shashikala as Mrs Dhanraj
- Deepshikha Nagpal as Pammi
- Maleeka Ghai as Manisha
- Prem Chopra as Prem Bhandari
- Asrani as Khairatlal
- Pramod Moutho as Mathur
- Bharat Kapoor as Governor S.K. Tripathi
- Deepak Shirke as Davar
- Viju Khote as Damodar
- Dinesh Hingoo as Rustom
- Mahavir Shah as Inspector Dev Singh
- Gurbachan Singh as Jaggu
- Javed Shaikh as Arun
- Purnima Talwalkar as Vimmi
- Birbal as Karan

== Soundtrack ==
The soundtrack is composed by Nikhil-Vinay except for Ek Haseen Ladki composed by Rajesh Roshan with lyrics by Anand Bakshi.

- "Choona Na Mera Ghungta" - Poornima
- "Ek Hassen Ladki" - Udit Narayan
- "Kisne Dekha Kisne Jana" - Sonu Nigam
- "Solah Baras Intezar Karliya" - Asha Bhosle
- "Tu Ne Mujhe Pukara" - Kumar Sanu, Anuradha Paudwal
