= Hum To Mohabbat Karega =

- Directed by: Kundan Shah
- Written by: Kundan Shah; Ranjit Kapoor
- Produced by: K. P. Singh
- Starring: Bobby Deol; Karisma Kapoor; Johnny Lever; Maleeka Ghai
- Cinematography: Thomas A. Xavier
- Edited by: Aseem Sinha
- Music by: Songs: Anu Malik; Score: Surindher Sodhi
- Production company: KPS Films
- Distributed by: NH Studioz
- Release date: 26 May 2000
- Country: India
- Language: Hindi
- Budget: ₹7.50 crore
- Box office: ₹9.92 crore

Hum To Mohabbat Karega (transl. I Will Love You Always) is a 2000 Indian Hindi-language romantic thriller film written and directed by Kundan Shah starring Bobby Deol and Karisma Kapoor. This film was inspired by the 1981 American film Eyewitness.

== Plot ==
Rajiv "Raju" Bhatnagar is a waiter in a popular hotel. He is in love with Geeta Kapoor, a famous news anchor. He is obsessed with her news segment, and his dream is to marry her one day. He meets Mr. Desai who is staying at the hotel. On his way out of Mr. Desai's hotel room, he sees a stranger named Ketu going into his room. By the time Raju reaches the ground floor, he sees blood dripping from the top and sees Mr. Desai lying dead on the side of his room window. News coverage of the murder is assigned to Geeta, who arrives at the hotel to interview people. Raju is dying to meet her, and the only way to meet his love is to lie. Besides, she is engaged to her channel's head, Rohit.

Raju lies to her that he witnessed the murder. The unknown killer then decides to murder him too and begins to hunt Raju. Meanwhile, Geeta is looking for her brother Vikram, and for information, she seeks help from a convict named Gul Mahomed (Rajendra Tiwari), who was framed for illegal money-making by the Mafia. Vikram was trying to help Gul Hassan prove his innocence but was kidnapped by the Mafia. Then Gul escaped from jail. Raju decides to help Geeta even with the risk to his life, but Geeta learns the truth and leaves him. When he looks for Geeta, he does not know that the Mafia and Police are also after him.

Meanwhile, Gul Mahomed is mysteriously murdered. Geeta and Raju meet and decide to get back together and look for the murderer, who is a part of the Mafia. Soon enough, Raju is also kidnapped by the Mafia. The Mafia forced him into working for them as a gangster. Raju also pretends to go along with them. However, when he goes to meet Geeta, the Mafia understands his pretense and plans to kill him. Geeta rescues him, and Raju tells her the route she needs to take. For some random reason, Raju knows everything there is in that village. May it be a river, a motorboat, or a monk's house, he knows it all. When Geeta asks him how he knows it, he tells her that she used to live there with him somehow.

Disregarding this, Raju steals diamonds from Mr. Desai's locker with the help of Geeta. But she then finds he has disappeared with the gems and was actually a part of the Mafia all along. Geeta cries and walks out of his life, but it is revealed that he only stole because the Mafia had kidnapped his friend Kutty and his girlfriend Vishali. Geeta and Rohit are about to get married when Raju shows up and gives her proof that Rohit is actually the killer and that he has also shot Vikram. He wanted to create TV news channels for which he needed the diamonds Mr. Desai had, and Mr. Desai's name was actually Patel.

Vikram found out about Rohit's plans and was going to expose him in the media. But Rohit murdered and hid Vikram and Gul Mahomed's daughter. Gul Mahomed wanted to meet Geeta to tell her that Rohit is the murderer. As Rohit forces Geeta to marry him, Raju jumps in and rescues her. Raju and Geeta then record the Mafia and Rohit with the counterfeit note-making and air it as a live feed. Raju with the police surrounds the Mafia, who are then arrested. However, Rohit abducts Geeta and runs from there. Raju chases after them, but Rohit is waiting around the corner. Once Raju comes into view, Rohit shoots him, and Raju collapses. Rohit is about to kill Geeta, but Raju throws him off the top of the factory building.

Raju is rewarded with the chance to work in Geeta's news channel, and the two arrange for their wedding.

== Cast ==
- Bobby Deol as Rajiv "Raju" Bhatnagar
- Karishma Kapoor as Geeta Kapoor, Press Reporter
- Johnny Lever as Kutti
- Maleeka Ghai as Varsha
- Sadashiv Amrapurkar as Inspector Shinde
- Shakti Kapoor as Ketu
- Dalip Tahil as Suraj
- Vijay Kashyap as Havaldar Rokde
- Rohit Roy as Rohit
- Smita Bansal as Sanjana, Press Reporter

== Soundtrack ==
Hum To Mohabbat Karega

Soundtrack album by Anu Malik
- Released: 2000
- Genre: Feature film soundtrack
- Label: Saregama

The soundtrack of the film was composed by Anu Malik. The lyrics were written by Majrooh Sultanpuri.

#	Title	Singer(s)
1	"Tere Aagey Peechey"	Alka Yagnik, Kumar Sanu
2	"Yeh Khushi Ki Mehfil"	Kumar Sanu, Alka Yagnik
3	"Suno Suno, Kaho Kaho"	Alka Yagnik, Kumar Sanu
4	"Hum To Mohabbat Karega"	Sonu Nigam, Anu Malik, Sunidhi Chauhan
5	"Churalo Dil"	Anu Malik, Shraddha Pandit
6	"Dada Maanja Baba Maanja"	Anu Malik, Alka Yagnik
7	"Leh Liya Leh Liya"	Abhijeet, Sukhwinder Singh, Sudesh Bhosle
8	"Hum To Mohabbat Karega (2)"	Anu Malik, Sunidhi Chauhan
