= Ekaant =

- Written by: Akul Tripathi
- Directed by: Shubhra Chatterji and Gautam Joglekar
- Starring: Akul Tripathi
- Country of origin: India
- Original language: Hindi
- No. of seasons: 2
- No. of episodes: 38

Production
- Producers: Monia Singhal Pinto; Sophy V Sivaraman; Milind Soman
- Running time: 30 minutes
- Production company: Face Entertainment Pvt. Ltd.

Original release
- Network: Epic
- Release: 20 November 2014

Ekaant (English meaning "Solitude") is an Indian television Hindi non-fiction series that aired on The EPIC Channel. The show is anchored by Akul Tripathi who takes viewers on a journey across the abandoned historic locations of India. Akul takes you through the abandoned roads and alleys of some of India’s historic places. Travelling through the spread out palaces and deserted forts, the show documents and investigates the eerie processes of abandonment of each site.

== Summary ==
The show highlights the grandeur and mysteries of India's historic monuments with the host Akul Tripathi. Each episode takes viewers to a different part of India, from a fort to a tomb to relive their grandeur. At each location, Akul seeks to uncover the untold stories behind these places by interacting with locals and historians, exploring the ruins that were once flourishing habitats.

The show premiered on 19 November 2014 when the EPIC Channel launched in India. It was one of the driver non-fiction shows of the channel. Season 1 had twenty-six episodes. The first season received great reviews and the channel sanctioned a second season. Season 2 premiered on 9 July 2015 with twelve episodes. Ekaant is now available on EPIC On, EPIC TV's streaming platform.

== Episodes ==
=== Season 1 ===
- Episode 1 - Kuldhara

The pilot of season one takes the audience to the abandoned village of Kuldhara, a vast maze-like cluster of roofless homes, bare walls, and a carpet of disjointed bricks are all that remain of what is once said to have been a prosperous village. Sitting quiet in the sand dunes of western Rajasthan, this is just one of eighty-four such abandoned villages dotting the stark landscape. A local myth states that these villages were of the Paliwal Brahmins who fled their homes overnight to uphold their honour because the then prime-minister of the Jaisalmer court, man called Salem Singh wanted to marry the headman’s daughter against her wishes. How true this myth is, no one can tell.

- Episode 2 - Chiktan

Far up in the Himalayas, a couple of hours drive from the border town of Kargil, further north from the grand Srinagar-Leh Highway lie the ruins of what once must have been a majestic fort. Rumoured to be taller and older than its famous cousin – the Leh Palace, the Chiktan fortress is shrouded in many mysteries. Legends of its making, numerous sinister and violent events, magical tales of wondrous creations and a heart-wrenching tailspin of destruction and apathy encompass the story of this fabulous fortress set in an almost fantastical location.

- Episode 3 - Ross Island

Ross Island is a little Island at the mouth of the Port Blair Harbour. It is the entry point into the Andaman islands. At one point in time, it served as the capital of the British in this part of India. It was a township that had everything one may need to live a lavish life in. But today this island lies forgotten, deserted and totally abandoned.

- Episode 4 - Talakkad

There are stories of numerous curses in our ancient land. Many have solid alternate reasonings and Quite a few are plain ludicrous. Yet there stand out some that defy explanations and to whom every rational reasoning sounds hollow. The three pronged curse of Talakkad a once temple town near Mysore, now buried in sand, is one such pronouncement that many believe to have brought this fate on the town. It is also held responsible for the slow but steady eroding of the nearby village of Malingi and the reason why every alternate generation of the ruling Mysore family has not had a male heir. How much is true?

- Episode 5 - Murud

The astonishment of why some places lie abandoned and in ruins does not get more perplexing than this. Off the Konkan coast of Maharastra lies the impregnable, unassailable and unconquered fort of Janjira. A fascinating history that begins with a pirate keep from which the Ethiopians carved out a stone fortress. It has held back mighty warriors of the like of Shivaji the great Maratha champion and lends a distinctive colour to the eclectic social fabric of the region.

- Episode 6 - Unakoti

Unakoti is a place in the North East of India where carvings of Gods and Goddesses lie abandoned on a hill. In numbers these statues are one less than a crore and are in the form of rock cut structures. Nobody knows how and when these carvings were made. With mythological reasoning behind the existence of the statues, Unakoti is a discovery in itself. The episode delves into the possibilities of history that Unakoti has to offer.

- Episode 7 - Bhangarh

A couple of hours drive from Jaipur, in the land of a thousand forts, the fort of Bhangarh has consistently topped the list of the most haunted place in the country. Not much is known about the fort and the entire town the lies sprawled in front of it. Rumours of curses abound and all that meets the eye is a town that appears to have been abandoned at the spur of an instant. Is there a grain of truth in its many creepy stories or can they be explained away through logic?

- Episode 8 - Orchha

A medieval town of palaces and temples, and while the temples still draw pilgrims by the thousands the majestic palaces lie silent. What prompted the Bundelkhandi Kings of Orchha to abandon their capital and move elsewhere? This question throws up a plethora of answers and the most intriguing one tells us of a curse that explains why this town has been abandoned twice in the past and will be abandoned once more in the years to come.

- Episode 9 - Lakhpat

Lives of the human race has long been intertwined with the course of rivers and their mouths on the confluence with the great seas, civilisations flourished. Lakhpat is the setting of the apocalyptic premise were the river to disappear. Situated at the mouth of the Kori Creek from where the Sindhu once met the Arabian Sea, it is all but a fortified ghost town whose walls overlook the desert sands as it preserves within it, with infinite care, the remains of a two century old trading hub blessed by the holy men and the beloved of men of exceptional valour.

- Episode 10 - Kittur

Call it a revolt, mutiny or a revolution, India's First War of Independence was a defining moment in the history of the sub-continent. What followed in its wake is commonly known, yet 20 years before the great upheaval, Chenamma, the brave queen of Kittur in Karnataka, led the charge against the British, even defeating them on one occasion. The episode follows the story of this courageous leader and the indelible but often overlooked mark she left on our history.

- Episode 11 - Nyarma

A thousand years ago, in an age when Buddhism was prominent in Kashmir, Ladakh and Srinagar, an exceptionally visionary scholar and translator, Lochava Rinchen Zangpo, set up a world class university a kilometre away from where the famous Thikse Monastery stands today on the outskirts of Leh town. Lonely walls and silent shrines are what stand today, mute witnesses to the times when a wonder monk walked the land. There are as many contradictions to its disappearance as there are musings about the wonders it held.

- Episode 12 - Roha

In the vast territories of the Kutch, on top of a forlorn hillock stands the fort of Roha. Once the biggest jaagir in the region, it lies neglected and forgotten. A close observer in the tragic death of 120 princesses, the seat of brave rulers, home to famous artists, a once burgeoning and rich principality, this is a story of riches to ruins as tempests of fate took charge of Roha and reduced the stone fortress to whispers in the wind.

- Episode 13 - Cellular Jail

It's a place where freedom fighters were kept before the independence of India. This place has witnessed the torture and pain given to the people imprisoned here after the first war of independence. However, today it lies forgotten and only when one visits can one realise the importance of the freedom fighters and their stories. The episode also talks about the legend of Veer Savarkar and how his grit and determination helped him break free from one of the most dreaded jails in modern Indian history.

- Episode 14 - Gagron Fort & Vilasgarh

The quest for abandoned places and their stories leads to two different places in East Rajasthan. One, an erstwhile king's capital reduced to rubble after being ravaged by war, and the second, an unconquerable fort still standing high and proud after being torn by tragedy. Tying the two are valiant stories of a brave dynasty of Rajputs – the Khinchi Chauhans and their poignant history.

- Episode 15 - Halebidu

In the shadows of the world-renowned ruins of the Vijaynagar Empire lie the scattered remnants of a kingdom that sowed the seeds which led to the fruition of Vijaynagar and its glorious heritage. In the middle of swiftly developing towns and rapidly expanding highways are the ruins - some stately and others vanishing - of what was once the Hoysala Kingdom. Traced is the birth of this realm from a small hamlet to its capital with magnificent structures and grand temples.

- Episode 16 - Shekhawati

The sleepy town of Ramgarh in northern Rajasthan is known by connoisseurs as a unique open art gallery. It is the site of several mansions made at a time when it was on the crossroads of trade routes and wealth streamed in from all directions. The cenotaphs and palatial homes painted on the outside and inside with some fabulous examples of local artwork are visually exceptional as we follow the story of what turned this cosmopolitan trade city into a sleepy unknown town overflowing with vestiges of a splendid era.

- Episode 17 - Martand

Standing majestically on a plateau above the flood plains of Kashmir are the stupendous ruins of the Sun Temple of Martand. Described as "a dream in stone designed by Titans and finished by jewellers", the temple of Martand is part of the legacy of the indomitable Lalitaditya Mukhtapid of the Karkota dynasty of Kashmir which was once the centre of a mighty empire governed from the capital city of Parihaspora. Once the city of smiles, it is today a site of ruined stones. The episode sees the glory of Kashmir through the lens of one of its favourite sons.

- Episode 18 - Shibsagar

A place from where lies the story of a once- powerful Ancient kingdom of the Ahom Rulers. This kingdom shaped the beautiful north eastern state of Assam. However, despite the stories and the 600 year old important rule, Shibsagar today lies only as a hint of the grandeur before.

- Episode 19 - Champaner

Champaner lies in Gujarat, This town has seen three kingdoms and their contribution to several fortifications. At one point of time this place was the capital of Gujarat, but today lies only as a silent witness to past glory.

- Episode 20 - Hari Parbat

Known as the Koh-i-Maran in Persian, the hill of Hari Parbat is crested with a fort of the same name. Originally built by the Mughal Emperor Akbar, the fort has been the silent sentinel watching the winds of change and the many hands eager to grasp the land fabled as heaven on Earth. The team arrives in Kashmir as Akbar wrests control of the land for the Mughal Empire and follows the many tales of the various rulers vying for control over the Hari Parbat and wanting to be masters of Kashmir.

- Episode 21 - Nalanda

There are precious few monuments and artefacts in our ancient land which have survived the vagaries of time. But the ones that do are an insight into a time that was inimitable as it was marvellous. And few would stand in comparison with two jewels of ancient India – the fair mahajanapada of Vaishali, blessed and protected by Buddha and whose legacy led to the formation of amongst the greatest universities that the world has known – the unparalleled learning centre of Nalanda.

- Episode 22 - Lucknow

Amongst the many scattered battles of the First War of Independence of 1857, none has been eulogised in literature and popular culture as the Siege Of Lucknow. Once the quarters and centre of operations for the British Resident in the Court of the Nawab of Lucknow, the Lucknow Residency was the epicentre of a battle between the British and the Indian freedom fighters. The episode describes the times rife with passions, valour and determination as the British fought for supremacy with the future of the subcontinent up for grabs.

- Episode 23 - Bishnupur

Situated in a forgotten part of Bengal, 150 km northwest of Kolkata, is a city that was a proud capital for over 800 years of a kingdom whose royal lineage stretched over a thousand years! The only surviving heritage of the splendour of Bishnupur are some exquisitely constructed and decorated temples dedicated to Lord Vishnu. With generous use of terracotta and an influence of various styles, they portray a picture of life in medieval West Bengal which is lost to time and perhaps, tradition too.

- Episode 24 - Vijaydurg

On the Konkan coast of Maharastra sits in seeming placidness the serene sea fort of Vijaydurg. A rock that has been witness to thrilling times of an era when Shivaji and his empire spread through the Deccan like wildfire, followed by the formation of a naval force off its coast that dominated the Arabian sea for over 50 years. A hotspot of Maratha activity, in its history of daring feats, impossible achievements lies also a tragic tale of greed and power that sowed the seeds of the decline of the grand Maratha Empire.

- Episode 25 - Bateshwar

Hidden in the ravines of the Chambal and protected for centuries by dense forest is an ancient temple town. Named after the Lord of the Elements - Shiva, this site; the ancient Bateshwar has perhaps the densest concentration of temples in one location – 200 and counting. While KK Muhammed, an exemplary officer of the ASI, has set new standards in restoration of almost half of these, there is much about the antiquity and intricacies of this temple town that still evades the brightest minds, while its magic is slowly coming back to life.

- Episode 26 - Hampi

On the banks of the gleefully wavering Tungabhadra, flanked by mountains made of towering boulders, sits, what seems like an impossible city - Hampi. Once known as Vijaynagar and the capital of an empire whose wealth, power and reputation was the envy of the known world. Surpassing, if not equivalent to any modern-day urban settlement in scope, scale and vision; it was home to one of the largest populations in the world gathered in one location. The extensive ruins of Hampi defy the wildest imaginations and visualisation of ruined cities. That such a city in stone and mortar was built 500 years ago could scarcely be believed, save the splendour that are its magnificent ruins - a testament to times that were as glorious as they are intriguing.

=== Season 2 ===
- Episode 1 - Raigad

The legend of Shivaji and his heroic deeds is so vivid and overpowering in our minds that the place from where he set about creating an empire is lost in the haze of his personal glories. The capital hill fort of Raigad in the Sahyadris is a stellar example of hill forts in Maharastra and its story has drama befitting that of the conqueror who went about defining the course of history from this flat hill top.

- Episode 2 - Kumbhalgarh

Rajasthan is replete with forts that are seeped in the royal tradition of valour and sacrifice. Amongst the hundreds that dot the martial land of brave warriors is an exceptional one that is its dark knight - the extravagantly large fort of Kumbhagarh. Designed and created by Rana Kumbha, it holds the distinction of having the second longest wall in the world - next only to the Great Wall of China - that charts a serpentine course of 36 km across the Aravalis! A keeper and witness of key events in the history of Mewar, the soul of Rajasthan is incomplete without the reassuring countenance of Kumbhalgarh.

- Episode 3 - Asirgarh

At the northern edge of the massive Deccan plateau lies a forgotten fort that was once the key to open the doors to the Deccan. A survey by the British extolled it as the strongest fort in the country and one that was never taken by force – depending on which version of its many histories you feel should be believed. With an antiquity that only grows older every time it is explored, Asirgarh is a treasure trove of fascinating spellbinding stories so fantastic in their bearing that history and myth seem dyed in the same vat of riotous emotions.

- Episode 4 - Daulatabad

Delhi has always held the mantle of being the capital of Hindustan. While it may have functionally shifted around the area a few times on the necessities and vanities of its many rulers, there is only one instance of India's capital having shifted over a full 1000 km south to the city of Daulatabad near present-day Aurangabad. This outrageous, much-berated decision of Muhammad Tughlaq has created a legacy and an Ekaant that never fails to take your breath away.

- Episode 5 - Bijapur

The incredible Gol Gumbaz is the calling card of the town of Bijapur and remains its claim to fame. However, the once capital of the Adilshahis, Bijapur emerged the most successful of the Deccan Sultanates spawning a rich cultural, architectural and literary heritage that permeates every layer of our identity. Bursting with nuances of bravery, skill, diplomacy, patronage and an overbearing hangover of pathos, Bijapur is a sieve of memories that are destined to be treasured.

- Episode 6 - Burhanpur

The historical southern limit of Hindustan and from where the Deccan plateau would begin is the inconspicuous modern day town of Burhanpur. Inconspicuous, today, yes. But roll back a few centuries and Burhanpur was the second stronghold of the Mughals. And from that time lie undisturbed and forgotten, treasures of history in capsules of time that guard an eye opening past and some unlikely love stories.

- Episode 7 - Kangra

It is perhaps the oldest surviving fort in India – with references from as far back as the Mahabharata and a royal lineage that is just as ancient and illustrious. Built of rock and stone, sitting solid on the peak of a mountain that overlooks the grand confluence of Banging and Majhi rivers, it is easy to see that it must once have been formidable. Then why today, does it lie, a shadow of its former self?

- Episode 8 - Jageshwar

Too often, Ekaant (isolation) is associated with ruins. And a place in ruins is heartbreaking, but if anything could be worse, it is a place which still breathes, but no one cares. The Ekaant of ignorance and exclusion. The ousting from memory of a place that was once considered the paanchva dhaam and an unmissable pitstop in the pilgrimage circuit of Uttarakhand. What happened? Human error, vagaries of time or a divine rebuke?

- Episode 9 - Ramnagar

It takes many rivers to make a sea. And many unnamed rivulets plait together to make that happen. And in each rivulet is the sea. In the sea of history, Ramnagar is one such rivulet. Overlooked and undervalued in a corner of the state of Jammu & Kashmir, it holds in its womb the beginnings of the histories that define that region.

- Episode 10 - Leh Palace

The palace in Leh, the capital of Ladakh, is the picture postcard of the region. An architectural marvel, 9 stories high, it sits forlorn as the world around it changes dramatically. A change that was wrought when the will of one man from the distant plains of India caused ripples in history that shaped the folds of geography in this soul grabbing Himalayan region.

- Episode 11 - Bhathinda Qila Mubarak

In what was once the frontier regions of Hindustan, a silent sentinel traces its history as far back as when Jesus was walking the streets of Jerusalem. A fort that has been the proud host of great names like Mohammad Ghori, Mahmud Ghazni, Prithviraj Chauhan and where the indomitable Sultan Raziya was imprisoned, the Qila Mubarak of Bathinda, once the axe that broke the invaders from the north, seems stuck in a quicksand of time and is fast sinking into memory oblivion.

- Episode 12 - Mehrauli Archaeological Park

New Delhi, the capital of India is a city inhabited since time immemorial. The Mehrauli archaeological park is a 100-acre area that has collected within its limits ruins and monuments spanning 1000 years! From a remnant of the Lal Kot - the first fortification of Delhi to the time of the British asserting their dominion, the park is spread like what can only be called, an island of Indian history.

== Production ==
The show is produced by Face Entertainment Pvt. Ltd. and directed by Shubhra Chatterji and Gautam Joglekar.

== Critical reception ==
"I have watched many shows on Discovery and History TV 18 that talk and describe the haunted and abandoned places around the world, but to have our very own Indian show describing the history and sagas of our ancient monuments and places make me feel proud that Indian television is really going to the next level." – mouthshut.com
