= Shweta Kawatra =

Indian television actress

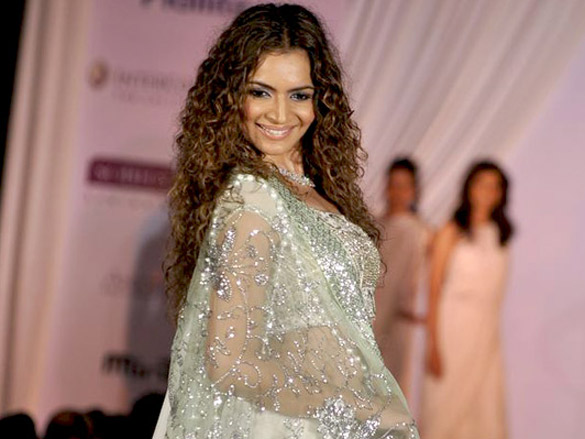
- Shweta in 2012
- Born: 10 February 1976 (age 50); Delhi, India
- Occupations: Actress; Model; Television presenter
- Years active: 1997-Present
- Spouse: Manav Gohil (m. 2004)
- Children: 1

Shweta Kawatra (born 10 February 1976) is an Indian actress, model and television presenter.

== Personal life ==
She is married to TV actor Manav Gohil. They participated in the dance competition show Nach Baliye where Manav was awarded best dancer by Saroj Khan. After eight years of marriage, the couple became parents to a daughter, Zahara Tabeetha, (born on 11 May 2012). Shweta Kawatra practices Buddhism and is a member of the Soka Gakkai. She is best known for her role as Pallavi Agarwal in Kahaani Ghar Ghar Kii and as Nivedita Mittal in Kumkum – Ek Pyara Sa Bandhan. She has had appearances in many other TV serials, most notably in C.I.D.. She appears in Sawal E Ishq to answer love questions on fame Bollywood. She played Bhayankar Pari in Baal veer.

== Filmography ==
Year	Film	Role	Notes
2000	Ghar Ek Mandir	Mala	
2005	My Brother Nikhil	Lawyer	
2011	Murder 2	Dr. Sania	
2014-2015	Baalveer	Bhayankar Pari	Main lead Negative
2016	Azhar	Magazine journalist	cameo appearance
2022	Ram Setu	Lawyer	

== Television ==
- Saturday Suspense as Sumita Chopra (Episode 98)
- Star Bestsellers – Masoom as Advocate (Episode 25)
- Mausam
- Khauff on Sony SAB as Alka (Episode 1 & Episode 2)
- Ghar Ek Mandir as Mala
- Thriller at 10 – Hotel as Sonia Malhotra (Episode 116 – Episode 120)
- Kahaani Ghar Ghar Kii as Pallavi Bhandari / Pallavi Kamal Agarwal
- Rishtey – Aank Micholi as Anu (Episode 142)
- Koshish
- Kkusum as Esha Chopra / Esha Puri
- Miss India
- Krishna Arjun as Maria (Episode 44 – Episode 47)
- C.I.D. as Dr. Niyati Pradhan (from Episode 139)
- Ye Meri Life Hai
- Jassi Jaissi Koi Nahin as Meenakshi
- CID: Special Bureau as Dr. Niyati Pradhan
- Saat Phere: Saloni Ka Safar as Reva Sehgal
- Fear Factor India as Contestant
- Jeena Isi Ka Naam Hai as Guest (Episode 7)
- Kumkum – Ek Pyara Sa Bandhan as Nivedita Mittal
- Baal Veer as Bhayankar Pari ( 2014 – 2015)
- Sawal E Ishq as Shweta Kawatra
- Nach Baliye 2 as Contestant
- Soni Mahiwal as Soni
- Sonu Sweety as Sweety
- Gaadi Bula Rahi Hai
- Adaalat as Advocate Surveen Khurana
- Phulwa as SSP Amrita Tiwari
- Tyohaar Ki Thaali as Guest
- Karrle Tu Bhi Mohabbat as Radhika Awasthi
- Shaitani Rasmein as Saudamini
