= Jaane Pehchaane with Javed Akhtar =

- Genre: Non-fiction
- Country of origin: India
- Original language: Hindi
- No. of seasons: 1
- No. of episodes: 26

Original release
- Network: The Epic Channel
- Release: 8 July – 1 October 2015

Jaane Pehchaane with Javed Akhtar is an Indian television Hindi-language entertainment show based on the Indian film industry that aired on the EPIC Channel. The show is hosted by the popular Bollywood lyricist, Javed Akhtar. In the show, Javed Akhtar explores the evolution of Bollywood characters. The show premiered on 8 July 2015 and aired twenty-six episodes of half-hour each.

Each episode takes on one role while the series covers roles like villains, heroes, brothers, etc. In each episode, Javed Akhtar reminisces about popular characters, films, scenes and dialogues and shows how these roles have evolved in time.

== Production ==
The show is produced by Cinestaan Digital Pvt. Ltd and directed and co-written by Tarika Khattar.

== Episodes ==
| Episode No. | Date of Telecast | Topic |
|---|---|---|
| 1 | 8 July 2015 | Villains |
| 2 | 9 July 2015 | Villains |
| 3 | 15 July 2015 | Comedians |
| 4 | 16 July 2015 | Comedians |
| 5 | 22 July 2015 | Superstars |
| 6 | 23 July 2015 | Superstars |
| 7 | 29 July 2015 | Courtesans |
| 8 | 30 July 2015 | Courtesans |
| 9 | 5 August 2015 | Child Artist |
| 10 | 6 August 2015 | Child Artist |
| 11 | 12 August 2015 | Siblings |
| 12 | 13 August 2015 | Siblings |
| 13 | 19 August 2015 | Mothers |
| 14 | 20 August 2015 | Mothers |
| 15 | 26 August 2015 | Friendship |
| 16 | 27 August 2015 | Friendship |
| 17 | 2 September 2015 | Vamps |
| 18 | 3 September 2015 | Vamps |
| 19 | 9 September 2015 | Police |
| 20 | 10 September 2015 | Police |
| 21 | 16 September 2015 | Working Class Hero |
| 22 | 17 September 2015 | Angry Young Man |
| 23 | 23 September 2015 | Heroines |
| 24 | 24 September 2015 | Heroines |
| 25 | 30 September 2015 | Heroines |
| 26 | 1 October 2015 | Poets & Singers |
