= Khwaabon Ka Safar with Mahesh Bhatt =

Television series

- Genre: Narrative Non-Fiction
- Presented by: Mahesh Bhatt
- Country of origin: India
- Original language: Hindi
- No. of seasons: 1
- No. of episodes: 14

Production
- Production locations: Mumbai, Maharashtra, India
- Camera setup: Multi-camera

Original release
- Network: EPIC TV
- Release: 19 October 2015

Khwaabon Ka Safar with Mahesh Bhatt is an Indian Hindi-language television series which aired on The EPIC Channel. The show is hosted by Bollywood director, Mahesh Bhatt.

The show is based on the history of prominent Indian film studios.

== Host ==
- Mahesh Bhatt

== Show summary ==
The show takes the audience through the evolution of Bollywood's landmark film studios. In each episode, famous stalwarts of the Indian film industry pay tribute and share lesser-known facts about the history of the founders of the studios. The show recounts their experiences working with the creators of these studios, namely Bombay Talkies, R. K. Studios, and Prabhat Studios among others. It features some of the Bollywood greats from the past who share their stories, including Randhir Kapoor, Sharmila Tagore, and others. The series finale pays homage to Mahesh Bhatt.

The series premiered on The EPIC Channel on 19 October 2015, with 14 episodes, each lasting one hour. Mahesh Bhatt was chosen to host the show keeping in line with the channel strategy of building a base of 'Storytellers' who would serve as hosts on its various shows and would be experts in their respective fields. Other 'storytellers' included were Naseeruddin Shah, Javed Akhtar, Anurag Basu, Jaaved Jaaferi, Devdutt Pattanaik, and more.

== Episodes ==
Studios covered on the show:

- R.K. Studios
- Bombay Talkies
- Guru Dutt Films Pvt. Ltd.
- Prabhat Film Company
- Rajkamal Kalamandir
- New Theatres
- Navketan Films
- Filmistan
- Filmalaya
- Bimal Roy Productions
- B.R. Films
- Mehboob Khan Productions
- Rajshri Films
- Mahesh Bhatt and Vishesh Films
