= Mid Wicket Tales =

Indian television series

- Genre: Non-Fiction
- Country of origin: India
- Original language: Hindi
- No. of seasons: 1
- No. of episodes: 26

Production
- Editors: Anu Kamala, Tamal Das, Salman Malik
- Running time: 60 minutes
- Production company: Greymatter Films

Original release
- Network: Epic
- Release: 10 July 2015

Mid- Wicket Tales with Naseeruddin Shah is an Indian television Hindi entertainment cricket based show which aired on the Epic Channel. The show is hosted by veteran actor Naseeruddin Shah. In his own versatile narrative style, Shah explores the many interesting untold stories of Indian cricket. It is now available on EPIC ON, EPIC TV's streaming platform.

== Show summary ==
‘Mid-Wicket Tales with Naseeruddin Shah’ takes viewers on a journey of many untold stories of Indian cricket. Naseeruddin Shah, a Bollywood actor and theatre person, brings alive the experiences on-screen through story-telling. Each episode covers various aspects and attributes of the game interspersed with trivia and anecdotes.

The show takes on several themes in each episode like captains, fast bowlers, spinners, wicket-keepers, glamour and more. The show captures many personalities narrating cricketing experiences and stories including Sharmila Tagore on Tiger Pataudi, Shashi Tharoor, Nari Contractor, Bishan Singh Bedi, Charu Sharma among others. Some of the cricketers featured on the show are Tiger Pataudi, Kapil Dev, Vijay Hazare, Syed Kirmani, Ravi Shastri, Farookh Engineer and M S Dhoni.

== Show themes ==
- Episode 1 - Our Glorious Openers
- Episode 2 - The Captains of Our Destiny
- Episode 3 - India's Extraordinary Spinners
- Episode 4 - Patrons of Indian Cricket
- Episode 5 - Fantastic Pacers of India
- Episode 6 - India at The World Cups
- Episode 7 - Agents of Change
- Episode 8 - Our Stylish Left-Handers
- Episode 9 - India in England
- Episode 10 - Brave Hearts of Indian Cricket
- Episode 11 - Our Dynamic Wicket-keepers
- Episode 12 - The Amazing All-Rounders
- Episode 13 - IND vs PAK - The Epic Rivalry
- Episode 14 - Teenage Sensations
- Episode 15 - Men of Steel
- Episode 16 - Vital Victories
- Episode 17 - Monikers of Indian Cricketers
- Episode 18 - India's Cricketing Families
- Episode 19 - Stylish Stroke Players
- Episode 20 - A Caribbean Affair
- Episode 21 - Small Town Heroes
- Episode 22 - Glorious Comebacks
- Episode 23 - Bastions of Indian Cricket
- Episode 24 - Beyond The Boundary
- Episode 25 - Blistering Batsmen
- Episode 26 - Glamour and Cricket

== Production ==
The show is produced by Greymatter Films.
