= Dharmakshetra =

- Genre: Mythology; Drama
- Starring: See below
- Country of origin: India
- Original language: Hindi

Original release
- Network: EPIC (TV channel)
- Release: 19 November 2014

Dharmakshetra is a fictional drama series which aired on the channel The EPIC Channel. The series is set in the aftermath of the battle of Mahabharata. The story is told from the perspective of the various characters as they are brought to the court of Chitragupta. All the episodes are available on streaming network EPIC ON.

== Synopsis ==
After the end of 18 days war of Mahabharata, Pandavas and Kauravas reach the court of Chitragupta where they have to answer their actions of their past life. In each episode one of the character takes the centre stage to answer the questions asked by Chitragupta on behalf of the others.

== Cast ==
- Gaurav Ghatnekar as Krishna
- Aarya Dharmchand Kumar as Karna
- Ankit Arora as Arjuna
- Chandan K Anand as Yudhishthira
- Dinesh Mehta as Bhima
- Gaurav Walia as Duryodhana
- Kashmira Irani as Draupadi
- Rahul Jat as Satayasen (Karna Putra)
- Sahil Khan as (Karna Putra)
- Pushkar Goggia as Nakula
- Rahul Kumar as Sahadeva
- Sameer Kondekar as Dushasana
- Bajrang Bali Singh as Chitragupta
- Armaan Anwar Khan as Bhishma
- Anjali Rana as Kunti
- Maleeka Ghai as Gandhari
- Manish Sharma as Dhritarashtra
- Amit Behl as Dronacharya
- Saurabh Goyal as Ashwatthama
- Shishir Sharma as Vyasa
- Rohit Tiwari as Vidura
- Anup Shukla as Drupada
- Chirag Dave as Dhrishtadyumna
- Vishal Thakker as Abhimanyu
- Jagat Rawat as Shakuni
- Shireen Mirza as Amba and Shikhandini
- Arun Shekhar as Sanjay

== Episodes ==
No.	Title	Original release date
1	"Draupadi"	18 November 2014
2	"Shakuni"	25 November 2014
3	"Duryodhan : Part 1"	2 December 2014
4	"Duryodhan : Part 2"	9 December 2014
5	"Dronacharya : Part 1"	16 December 2014
6	"Dronacharya : Part 2"	23 December 2014
7	"Arjun : Part 1"	30 December 2014
8	"Arjun : Part 2"	6 January 2015
9	"Kunti"	13 January 2015
10	"Ashwathama"	20 January 2015
11	"Bheem : Part 1"	27 January 2015
12	"Bheem : Part 2"	3 February 2015
13	"Bhishma : Part 1"	10 February 2015
14	"Bhishma : Part 2"	17 February 2015
15	"Gandhari"	24 February 2015
16	"Dhrishtadyumna"	3 March 2015
17	"Yudhishthir : Part 1"	10 March 2015
18	"Yudhishthir : Part 2"	17 March 2015
19	"Dushasana"	24 March 2015
20	"Dhritarashtra"	31 March 2015
21	"Karna : Part 1"	7 April 2015
22	"Karna : Part 2"	11 May 2015
23	"Nakul and Sehadev"	12 May 2015
24	"Vidura"	13 May 2015
25	"Vyasa"	14 May 2015
26	"Krishna : Part 1"	15 May 2015
27	"Krishna : Part 2"	15 May 2015
28	"Krishna : Part 3"	15 May 2015
29	"Krishna : Part 4"	15 May 2015
