= Epic TV =

Indian television channel

- Country: India
- Headquarters: Mumbai, Maharashtra, India

Programming
- Language: Hindi And English
- Picture format: 1080p (FHD)

Ownership
- Owner: The Epic Company
- Sister channels: Epic Bharat; Epic Bhojpuri; Epic Kids; Epic Music; Epic Parivaar

History
- Launched: 19 November 2014; 11 years ago

Availability

Streaming media
- Epic On (India): epicon.in

Epic TV is an Indian television channel that airs action, drama, comedy and narrative non-fiction and fictional programming with a focus on Indian history, folklore and epic genre. Launched by The Epic Company on 19 November 2014, a company owned by Anand Mahindra, it airs programmes in Hindi and English. Aditya Pittie, CEO of Pittie Group is the Managing Director of Epic TV.

Some of its programmes like Raja, Rasoi Aur Anya Kahaniyaan; Kahi Suni; Dharmakshetra; Sanrachana have been added to Netflix. The slogan of the channel is "Soch Se Aage"(means Ahead of Thought).

Their digital platform named Epic ON was launched in early 2017 with most shows available.

The company has revealed a vision of organising and building itself as a media network, with new ventures across every touch-point of the content life-cycle that would consolidate under the banner of IN10 Media. As part of its expansion plans, the company also announced the launch of two new television channels – Epic Kids (a kids channel) and Epic Parivaar.

== Shows ==
=== Fiction ===
- Dharmakshetra
- Siyaasat
- Stories by Rabindranath Tagore
- Yam Kisi Se Kam Nahin

=== Non-Fiction ===
- Adrishya
- Devlok with Devdutt Pattanaik (3 Seasons)
- Ekaant (2 Seasons & Sarhad Paar Special Episode)
- Jaane Pehchaane with Javed Akhtar
- Journeys in India (Acquired)
- Khwaabon Ka Safar with Mahesh Bhatt
- Mid Wicket Tales with Naseeruddin Shah
- Raja, Rasoi Aur Anya Kahaniyaan (4 Seasons)
- Sharanam - Safar Vishwas Ka (2 Seasons)
- Tyohaar Ki Thaali
- Jai Hanuman (Acquired)
- Mahabharat (Acquired)
- Mahabharat Katha (Acquired)
- Shree Ganesh (Acquired)

=== Documentaries ===
- Jallianwala Bagh - Punjab Da Dil (2 Part Series)
- Kashmir Ki Virasat
- Naga - The Eternal Yogi (Acquired)
- Nagaland - The Hornbill Festival & Songs of Japfu (2 Part Series, Acquired)
- Nandadevi (Acquired)
- Superman of Malegaon
- Vijay Diwas - The Fall of Dhaka

=== Short Series ===
- Banaras
- Devlok Mini
- Tyohaar Ki Thaali Recipe Special
