= My Family Feast =

My Family Feast is an Australian television program hosted by chef Sean Connolly. The show first screened on SBS in 2009 and features the lives and cooking traditions of Australian migrants and their families. The show is partly a cultural profile and partly a cooking show. Australians with diverse ethnic backgrounds invite Connolly into their homes, introduce him to their families, share cultural traditions and show how to cook a family feast with recipes and techniques that have been lovingly passed from generation to generation.

== Host ==
Sean Connolly was born in the United Kingdom. He started his chef's apprenticeship at the Pennine Hilton, Ainley Top in Huddersfield. After continuing his apprenticeship in various restaurants throughout the UK, he arrived in Australia in 1988 on a working holiday and fell in love with the local weather, produce and burgeoning food scene. After various sous chef roles, he was appointed to Sydney's Astral restaurant in 1995. In 2008, he was named the Sydney Morning Herald 'Chef of the Year' and opened his second restaurant, Sean's Kitchen.

== Episodes ==
=== Season 1 ===
- S1, Ep1 Congolese

The Congo is alive in Sydney! After a fruitful visit to Mbuyi's African vegetable garden, Sean Connolly and the Kisimba family host a colourful Congolese party in the backyard of their home.

- S1, Ep2 Italian

Antonio, proud patriarch of the Pacialeo family, invites Sean Connolly into his home and teaches him how to make traditional Italian Tomato Sauce and play Briscola (a popular Italian card game).

- S1, Ep3 Chinese

Eileen and Newman Yip invite Sean Connolly to spend a sumptuous weekend with their family while they celebrate Ching Ming - an annual Chinese gathering when families pay respect to their late ancestors.

- S1, Ep4 Mandaean Iraqi

The Abboud Al-Suhairy family fled persecution in Iraq to start a new life in Australia and Sean Connolly is invited into their home to learn traditional recipes for a special family dinner.

- S1, Ep5 Vietnamese

The Le family honour the annual Vietnamese Moon Festival, with a banquet of traditional dishes and Sean Connolly is there to learn how it's done.

- S1, Ep6 Cuban

Sean Connolly recounts his meeting with the "Cubanadas", a dynamic group of Cuban women who show him how to cook their favourite dishes for their friend Margarita San Jose's 70th birthday celebration.

- S1, Ep7 Burmese Kachin

A close-knit community of Burmese Kachin immigrants invite Sean to witness a traditional ceremony and take part in the feast that follows.

=== Season 2 ===
- S2, Ep1 Afghan

Dr. Rahman Shinwari and his wife Dr. Arian are Pashtuns who moved to Australia during the Soviet occupation of Afghanistan. Sean Connolly joins them as they prepare for Eid al-Adha, an annual Islamic festival of feasting to honour the sacrifices of the prophet Abraham.

- S2, Ep2 Indian

Bengali bride Shrabastee and her Punjabi groom Ankit represent the coming together of two traditional Indian families in the heart of Australia. Sean Connolly is invited to their wedding, which culminates in a colourful and opulent vegetarian feast.

- S2, Ep3 Greek

It is St. George's Day and ex-rugby player George Gavalas is celebrating his name day with family and friends, Greek style. George and his wife Angela are part of an extended family of Greek Australians. Their parents are from Kalymnos and Lesbos - two very different islands in the Aegean Sea - and the dishes prepared for the occasion will reflect their respective backgrounds. Brother-in-law Costa cooks octopus on the barbecue while George introduces Sean to sea urchins. Sister Foffi and her mum cook spanokopita.

- S2, Ep4 Argentina

Sean Connolly meets Graciela Yoia at the flamenco dance school she has been running for 27 years with her husband Ricardo.

- S2, Ep5 Serbia

Stana and Micho Kolundzija are Serbians who moved to Australia on a whim over 40 years ago and they have raised their family of daughters in the Sydney suburb of Mascot. Sean Connolly joins them to celebrate Stana's 66th birthday.

- S2, Ep6 Balinese

Sean Connolly meets members of the Sydney Balinese community in the grounds of Sydney University where they keep their gamelan instruments.

== Awards ==
- Best television series for My Family Feast. Australian Food Media Awards 2010.
- Best television series for food and wine culture for My Family Feast. World Food & Wine Television Festival 2010.
- Best In World Cookbook for Celebrity chef: English My Family Feast. Gourmand World Cookbook Awards 2011.
