= Raja, Rasoi Aur Anya Kahaniyaan =

- Genre: Narrative non-fiction
- Written by: Raghav Khanna (Season 1 & 2); Vivek Singh (Season 3 & 4)
- Directed by: Akshar Pillai (Season 1); Gaurav Mehra (Season 2, 3 & 4); Raghav Khanna (Creative Director Season 1, 2)
- Voices of: Manwendra Tripathy
- Country of origin: India
- Original language: Hindi
- No. of seasons: 4
- No. of episodes: 45

Production
- Producers: Nidhi Tuli & Ashraf Abbas
- Cinematography: various
- Editor: various
- Running time: 60 minutes (season 1); 30 minutes (season 2); 30 minutes (season 3); 30 minutes (season 4)
- Production company: Rangrez Media Pvt. Ltd.

Original release
- Network: Epic Channel
- Release: 24 December 2014 – 2022

Related
- Raja Rasoi aur Andaaz Anokha

Raja, Rasoi Aur Anya Kahaniyaan ("Kings, Kitchens and Other Stories") is an Indian television series shown on The Epic Channel. The show, primarily focused on Indian cuisine, gives an inside look into the royal kitchens of India. The series explores the history behind the royal and common cuisines of many states, including the invention of the dishes, and their intertwined nature with the corresponding culture.

The first season premiered on 24 December 2014, with 11 one-hour episodes. The Season 2 was launched on 8 July 2015, with 24 half-hour episodes. Season 3 and 4 of the show aired on 17 December 2021 and 14 October 2022 respectively, with 5 half-hour episodes.

== Show summary ==
The show presents legends and facts about culinary practices in different parts of India, often digressing about the local customs, rituals and royal history which influenced it. Chefs, food-writers, and experts share anecdotes on the food habits of the royalty, most of the latter being remnants of the princely states.

== Episodes ==
=== Season one ===
- Episode 1 – Jodhpur & Jaipur
- Episode 2 – Tamil Nadu (Tanjore)
- Episode 3 – Delhi & Rampur
- Episode 4 – Jammu and Kashmir
- Episode 5 – Punjab
- Episode 6 – Himachal Pradesh
- Episode 7 – Banaras & Allahabad
- Episode 8 – Lucknow & Mahmudabad
- Episode 9 – Mysore & Coorg
- Episode 10 – Kerala
- Episode 11 – Gujarat

=== Season two ===
- Episode 1 – Hyderabad
- Episode 2 – Odisha
- Episode 3 – Chhattisgarh
- Episode 4 – Andhra Pradesh
- Episode 5 – Puducherry
- Episode 6 – Kolkata
- Episode 7 – Mangalore
- Episode 8 – Goa
- Episode 9 – Maharashtra
- Episode 10 – Assam
- Episode 11 – Mathura
- Episode 12 – Sikkim
- Episode 13 – Murshidabad
- Episode 14 – Nagaland
- Episode 15 – Mumbai
- Episode 16 – Meghalaya & Tripura
- Episode 17 – Bihar
- Episode 18 – Ladakh
- Episode 19 – Uttarakhand
- Episode 20 – Madhya Pradesh
- Episode 21 – Northern India
- Episode 22 – Southern India
- Episode 23 – Eastern India
- Episode 24 – Western India

=== Season three ===
- Episode 1 – Bikaner
- Episode 2 – Bhopal
- Episode 3 – Kochi
- Episode 4 – Kotwara
- Episode 5 – Jambughoda

=== Season four ===
- Episode 1 – Mayurbhanj
- Episode 2 – Bhainsrorgarh
- Episode 3 – Jhabua
- Episode 4 – Sandur
- Episode 5 – Purnia

== Production ==
The show is produced by Rangrez Media Pvt. Ltd - Ashraf Abbas & Nidhi Tuli. Akash Thakkar as a Co-Producer. The concept & idea is by Ashraf Abbas. Cinematography is by Ankit Trivedi, Swapnil Sonawane, Mohit Kakodkar, Laxman Anand, Aniruddha Barua, Jiten Lucky, Saptarishi and Deepak Arya while direction is by Akshar Pillai (season 1), Gaurav Mehra (Season 2) & George Verghese (for some episodes of Season 2). The show has been researched, developed and written by Raghav Khanna with voice over by Manwendra Tripathy. Prof. Pushpesh Pant, one of the noted food historians of India, has been frequently featured in numerous episodes. Episodes have been shot in homes of royal families across regions where culinary practices and cuisines have been kept alive since centuries.

== Critical reception ==
Deccan Herald praised The EPIC Channel and the show that celebrates Indian food in all its diversity and complexity. It takes pride in India's varied culinary heritage and makes us reflect on the richness of diverse cuisines in our very own kitchens.

Since its original run on The EPIC Channel, all episodes are available on Epic On OTT platform in India. Netflix has been streaming the 1st season for viewing. The 3rd and 4th seasons can be viewed on YouTube.

== Spin-off ==
A host-based cookery show spinoff, titled "Raja Rasoi aur Andaaz Anokha," ("Kings, Kitchens and Quirks") was aired in 2017. Celebrity chef Ranveer Brar was the host for the season 1, co-starring Manwendra Tripathy. The show, with episodes 30 minutes in length, was telecast on The EPIC Channel.

A second season, with the same co-hosts, aired in October 2022.
