= Eating History =

History Channel docuseries

Eating History is an American docuseries that airs on the History Channel and premiered in 2020. In the series, collectors Josh Macuga and Gary "Old Smokey" Mitchell try vintage foods and related products, such as 1970s Fritos, 1913 hardtack, Pepsodent tooth powder, and New Coke.

== Cast and crew ==
Hosts Gary Mitchell and Josh Macuga met through YouTube.

Gary Mitchell became interested in vintage foods via tobacco: he collected and smoked old cigarettes and other tobacco-related products, giving him the nickname "Old Smokey". This, together with his interest in his grandfather's time in the military, led to eating preserved vintage military rations. He started trying a variety of military rations from different countries and time periods and made YouTube videos about it. Through this interest, he met Ken Conley, who suggested that he might be interested in hosting Eating History when the series was being developed.

Josh Macuga began collecting old food because of his family: when he was a child, his father and his uncle collected old bottles and other containers. Like Mitchell, he has a YouTube channel.

The production team includes a medic and a toxicologist, who do not allow the stars to eat foods that they deem unsafe, for example because of the risk of botulism. The series is produced by Sharp Entertainment.

== Episodes ==
The series has one season consisting of ten episodes.

No.	Title	Original release date	U.S. viewers (millions)
1	"Brush with History"	March 25, 2020	N/A
2	"Breakfast of Champions"	March 25, 2020	N/A
3	"Expiration Unknown"	April 1, 2020	N/A
4	"Apocalypse Chow"	April 1, 2020	N/A
5	"Once You Pop"	April 8, 2020	N/A
6	"From a Galaxy Far, Far Away"	April 8, 2020	N/A
7	"A Space Odyssey"	April 15, 2020	N/A
8	"The Candy Man"	April 22, 2020	N/A
9	"Leave it to Beaver Tail"	April 29, 2020	N/A
10	"Flavor Explosion"	May 6, 2020	N/A

== Reception ==
Some viewers have described Eating History's premise as a gimmick, but Mitchell says that the series also educates viewers: "There’s so much history behind everything we encounter."
