= Journeys in India =

Travel Documentory set in India

Journeys in India is a travel documentary TV series about India. The two seasons of the series feature all original footage. It is hosted by Bill Ball and is a tour of India that takes in both small villages and big cities. The first season premiered on January 10, 2013.

== Episodes ==
India's Natural Beauties: Udaipur and Jaipur Season 1, Episode 1 (aired January 10, 2013) A tour of India begins in Udaipur, which is known as both the City of Lakes and the City of Dawn. The trip continues to Jaipur, where stops include the Pink City, Palace of Winds (Hawa Mahal) and Amber Fort.

Hyderabad: The Lake City Season 1, Episode 2 (aired January 17, 2013) A tour of the ancient city of Hyderabad includes advice on how to buy souvenirs. Also: the city's high-tech and movie industries.

The Wildlife of Rajasthan: Ranthambore and Keoladeo National Park Season 1, Episode 3 (aired January 24, 2013) A visit to the Indian state of Rajasthan takes in Ranthambore National Park, which is part of the Project Tiger conservation program, and Keoladeo National Park, which is known for its abundant birdlife.

Kerala Season 1, Episode 4 (aired January 31, 2013) A visit to the Indian state of Kerala stops in the cities of Cochin and Kozhikode. Included: a theatre performance; a festival; the ancient martial art of kalaripayattu; and a 1000-year-old boatyard.

The Far North: Amritsar, Shimla and Manali Season 1, Episode 5 (aired February 7, 2013) A visit to Amritsar, home to the holy Sikh shrine known as the Golden Temple. Other stops include the British-influenced town of Shimla and the resort area of Manali.

Agra and Its Environs Season 1, Episode 6 (aired February 14, 2013) A tour of Agra includes stops at the Agra Fort and Taj Mahal. Also: a visit to Fatehpur Sikri.

The Land of Rudyard Kipling: Kanha and Bandhavgarh National Parks Season 1, Episode 7 (aired February 21, 2013) Exploring India's Kanha and Bandhavgarh national parks.

Bangalore and Ooty Season 1, Episode 8 (aired February 28, 2013) A visit to Bangalore takes in Cubbon Park, Lal Bagh Gardens and the ancient Bull Temple, which is said to be the source of the Vishva Bharti River. Also: a trip to Ooty, where activities include touring plantations, riding an historic railroad and visiting the Stone House.

Mumbai & Goa Season 1, Episode 9 (aired March 7, 2013) A visit to Mumbai, where the city's history is told through the lives of Mahatma Gandhi (1869–1948) and Rudyard Kipling (1865–1936). Also: a tour of the coastal state of Goa.

Gir: The Last Refuge of the Lion Season 1, Episode 10 (aired March 14, 2013) The Gir region of Gujarat is visited. The area is home to Asiatic lions, spotted deers, owls and parrots, among other creatures. Also: a local dance group that preserves traditional dances.

Kathmandu and Chitwan National Park Season 1, Episode 11 (aired March 21, 2013) A visit to Nepal includes tours of Kathmandu, World Heritage temple complexes and Chitwan National Park. Also: flying around Mount Everest.

Tamil Nadu: Chennai, Pondicherry and Much More Season 1, Episode 12 (aired March 28, 2013) A visit to Chennai, which is the capital of Tamil Nadu. Also: a trip to Pondicherry.

Old and New Delhi, A City of Contrasts Season 1, Episode 13 (aired April 4, 2013) The Season 1 finale tours the capital of India, New Delhi, and the surrounding metropolis of Delhi. Included: the tomb of Humayun and the National Gandhi Museum.

"Great Caves of Ajanta and Ellora" Season 2, Episode 1

"Jodhpur: India's Queen of the Desert" Season 2, Episode 2

"Kazaringa: Land of Giants" "Season 2, Episode 3"

"Jaisalmer: India's Hidden Gem" "Season 2, Episode 4"

"Gujarat: Land of Extremes" "Season 2, Episode 5"

Central India: Land of Pilgrimages Season 2, Episode 6

"Mysore: The Rebel Kingdom" Season 2, Episode 7

Nagarhole and Bandipur: The Southern Paradise of India Season 2, Episode 8

Bhavnagar: Land of Surprises Season 2, Episode 9

Panna: Land of the Dhole Season 2, Episode 10

Ahmedabad: Land of Gandhi Season 2, Episode 11

Calcutta: City of Living History Season 2, Episode 12

South India: Land of Superlatives Season 2, Episode 13
