= Cooking with Dog =

Television series

- Genre: Cooking
- Country of origin: Japan
- Original languages: English; Japanese

Production
- Production locations: Tokyo, Japan
- Running time: 3–10 minutes

Original release
- Network: YouTube
- Release: September 9, 2007 – present

Related
- Go! Francis!

Cooking with Dog is a Japanese cooking show web series. It premiered on YouTube on September 9, 2007. The show features a Japanese woman known only as "Chef" who prepares the featured dish of the episode while her toy poodle Francis (via voiceover) narrates the process. While Chef speaks in Japanese, Francis narrates the episodes in English, a decision designed to expand the show's audience. Though initially focusing on Japanese cuisine, the show later expanded to include cuisine from other regions. New episodes were uploaded each Friday, before switching to a different release structure in early 2017. Despite the show's popularity and public appearances by Chef, the identities of both Chef and the show's producer are intentionally undisclosed out of privacy concerns.

Over time, the show has increased in popularity, going from a low budget, low production value channel to gaining a cult following and having over 1.6 million channel subscribers. Reviews have attributed the show's popularity to its simplicity, granular step-by-step approach to cooking, and Francis and Chef's pleasant, anxiety-free approach. The show is among YouTube's 10 most subscribed cooking and food channels and has garnered positive attention, public appearances, and awards.

In 2015, the show's popularity resulted in a spinoff web series called Go! Francis!, where a stuffed toy version of Francis travels throughout Japan discussing aspects of Japanese food culture, visiting places of culinary interest, and interviewing professionals in the food industry. The web series is also hosted on the same YouTube channel as Cooking with Dog. Francis died in late 2016, prompting an eventual announcement that the show would no longer continue to produce regular content, but would instead release occasional new episodes, featuring both an animated and stuffed animal version of Francis. In 2023, the show's Chef and producer stated in an interview with the Sunn that Francis will remain the only host on Cooking with Dog's YouTube channel.

== History ==
Cooking with Dog's creator and producer conceived of the idea for the show upon his return to Tokyo from Los Angeles, where he had graduated from film school and worked in film and television. Interested in continuing in the industry, but unable to find success on his own and lacking a significant budget, the producer approached Chef (whose identity is also undisclosed for privacy reasons) with the idea of a cooking show. Chef was known to the producer as a good cook, and agreed to the show concept: she would cook one dish while her toy poodle Francis would be dubbed to narrate. Francis, who lives with Chef, was included to make Chef feel more comfortable and at ease on camera, as she had no background with television. Additionally, the producer felt that including a cute dog would make the series stand out to viewers. The decision for Francis to narrate in Japanese-accented English was due to the producer's desire to promote Japanese culture through English-accessible content and widen the show's appeal. The show's producer does the voice acting for Francis.

The show debuted on YouTube on September 9, 2007. Described as a "low-budget, low quality" video, the first episode featured an instructional recipe for Japanese cuisine staple sukiyaki. The producer's goal was initially to promote washoku or Japanese cuisine to foreigners living outside Japan, but the show later expanded to include recipes for Japanese dishes inspired from other locales and gained a large following within Japan. Though the show started as a low budget production, the producer states that the increase in the show's popularity has increased revenue enough for him to devote himself full-time to the show's production. As of February 2014, the series had over 100 episodes.

== Format and production ==
Each episode opens with a shot of the featured dish and a greeting by Francis, who introduces himself as the host of the show. Chef then introduces the dish she will be preparing. As Chef prepares and cooks the ingredients, Francis sits on a stool in the background and narrates in voiceover with instructions for each step. Each episode ends with Chef tasting the prepared dish and giving a quick complimentary description of the flavor or texture. A title card with the necessary ingredients closes out the show, with Francis offering helpful tips or reminders about the recipe and wishing the viewer "Good luck in the kitchen!" A stinger at the end of the episode depicts the upcoming dish for the next episode. Episodes generally range between five and 10 minutes in length. In developing her recipes, Chef prefers to cook recipes designed around seasonal ingredients in Japan.

The show's producer has stated that several featured recipes were a result of requests from fans, especially Japanese desserts. The show regularly requests subtitle translations and viewers have provided subtitles in several languages, including Dutch, Indonesian, Norwegian, Polish, Portuguese, Spanish, and Vietnamese.

During its initial run, new episodes were uploaded each Friday. Episodes are filmed at Chef's home kitchen located in residential Tokyo. Because Francis's movement was limited by the high perch stool, he would often get tired and was allowed down between scenes. Francis died on November 6, 2016, at the age of 14 years and 9 months. The announcement was made to viewers in an episode on November 16, 2016. Cooking With Dog released a few new videos that were filmed while Francis was alive, featuring a stuffed toy likeness of Francis in his place. However, in the last video filmed while Francis was alive, the show announced that it would no longer continue providing regular videos and would only release occasional new content.

In most subsequent videos, the format is slightly modified. Chef wears a T-shirt with a cartoon of Francis, whose mouth and eyes are animated using computer graphics and narrates the steps during the episode. Toy stuffed animal dogs in Francis's likeness are also staged next to Chef as she cooks.

== Chef and the producer ==
Because of a concern for privacy, both the show's producer and Chef have opted not to disclose their identities publicly. However, both Chef and the producer have made public appearances, such as being a featured interview guest at the YouTube FanFest in 2013 or filming promo interviews for Hewlett-Packard. When asked at a fan meet-up event what their relationship was, both Chef and the producer/narrator stated that they would rather that remain a secret, though some have theorized that the producer is Chef's son.

Chef began cooking as a child and cooks for her parents still when she goes to visit them. Her favorite dishes are healthy shakes and dishes involving noodles, specifically udon, which she makes from scratch. In January 2012, a note accompanying the latest video for Cooking with Dog stated that Chef had sustained severe injuries from a bicycle accident in Tokyo. She was rushed to a nearby intensive care unit and was in stable condition. The news resulted in a flood of well-wishes from viewers in the video's comments section. Updates on Chef's situation were provided in subsequent episodes, as Chef entered physical therapy for her injuries, which required a head and neck brace, and eventually returned to film more episodes. While she was still in recovery, Cooking with Dog featured a close acquaintance of Chef's named Shin Kohama (小濱 晋), an actor in the theater troupe Jimo-Koyo.

Occasional videos also showed Chef outside the kitchen playing with Francis or taking him to be groomed. When asked how she feels about fame, Chef stated that although she does not enjoy being famous, the reaction from fans enjoying the program makes her want to produce more content. The show's Twitter and Facebook feeds also showcase Chef and Kohama's love of food by way of pictures of their meals at various shops, stands, and restaurants. Chef also revealed in a 2016 episode that she has a daughter and was very busy with the upcoming wedding. Chef's daughter recorded a short segment thanking viewers for their continued support of the show, revealing that she has appeared in previous videos.

== Go! Francis! ==
The popularity of Cooking with Dog spawned a spinoff web series in 2015 called Go! Francis!. The show features a needle felted doll of Francis traveling throughout Japan and visiting locales associated with Japanese food culture. Each episode revolves around a specific topic, such as bento, Japanese bread, or ramen. Francis visits locations affiliated with the topic—such as a bento box store Bento&co in Kyoto or the Shin-Yokohama Ramen Museum—and interviews food experts. The show features actor Cyrus Nozomu Sethna as the voice of Francis, and the show is produced by Foodies TV and Tastemade. The web series is hosted on the same channel as Cooking with Dog.

== Reception ==
Cooking with Dog's YouTube channel had over 1.1 million subscriptions as of May 2016. The series' first video has over 1.3 million views, and new videos routinely achieve views in the hundreds of thousands. The show was listed as among the top 10 most subscribed-to food and cooking channels on YouTube as of February 2015. Though the show initially targeted foreigners living outside Japan, it has gained a large following from Japanese viewers. Thirty percent of its viewership is from the United States and the show also has a strong following in Singapore. Reviewers attribute the success of the series to its simplicity, "retro vibe", ability to demystify recipes with granular step-by-step "anxiety-free" ease, as well as the quirkiness of a cute talking dog. The Daily Dot described the show as having a "cult following," while OC Weekly described the series as "certainly the most beloved [cooking channel on YouTube]."The Washington Post called it "delightful" and included it in its list of its favorite bizarre and zany lesser known food web series and blogs.

The web series has also garnered various accolades and positions on top lists. The series won in the category of "'How To' Blog" (ハウツー・ブログ) at the 2011 YouTube Video Awards Japan. Cooking with Dog was also a featured guest of the 2013 YouTube Japan Entertainment Week. Daily Tekk named it one of "The 100 Best YouTube Channels of 2015", placing it as 10th in its best channels for foodies. Eater.com included Cooking with Dog in its list "Five Other YouTube Stars You Need to Follow Now".

== Awards ==
Awards and nominations for Cooking with Dog
Year	Award Show	Category	Result	Recipient(s)
2011	YouTube Video Award Japan	'How To' Blog	Won	
