= Chef School =

- Country of origin: Canada
- No. of episodes: 26

Production
- Running time: 30 minutes

Original release
- Network: Food Network Canada
- Release: 1 January 2008

Chef School is a reality television series which airs on Food Network Canada. It is a 26-part docu-soap that follows the experiences of 12 students at the Stratford Chef School, one of Canada's most prestigious culinary schools.

The show airs in Canada, Hong Kong and the UK.

Top chefs from restaurants in Toronto, Vancouver and New York judge and critique the students' cooking.

== Series development ==
Crystal Asher, a second-year student at Stratford Chef School, approached Red Apple Entertainment president Rachel Low with the idea. Early in the program's development, the idea of a formal competition was ruled out, as the creators expected there would already be sufficient dramatic elements. For the first season, the producers chose 12 of 36 students in the school to follow. 1,000 hours of footage were edited down to the 13 half-hour episodes of the series' first season. Of the twelve students, only nine returned for the second season. One student, Danielle, did not graduate.

== Reception ==
At the time of the series debut, John Doyle of The Globe and Mail wrote, "It's a charming series, much less noisy and more astute than some of the higher-profile cooking-school shows."

== The 12 students ==
- Alex Landheer, the group's "troublemaker".
- Allison Jones, who is a former pastry chef.
- Andrew Coristine, who chose chef school over entering a PhD program in physics.
- Ben Sachse, Swiss-Canadian, studied Anthropology before pursuing a career in cooking.
- Danielle Stahlke, a former amateur hockey player.
- Dave Lingard, who has the most prior restaurant experience of the 12.
- Joyce Singh, a Stratford native.
- Kelsey Murray, the youngest of the group.
- Matthew Duffy, with a B.Comm in Hotel and Food Administration
- Mike Brennan, native of Wellesley, world traveller and a known party animal.
- Richard Francis, who is putting his life back on track after drug-and-alcohol rehab.
- Tim Besserer, the oldest and most overlooked member of the group.
