= Sankashti Chaturthi =

Monthly Hindu occasion dedicated to Ganesha

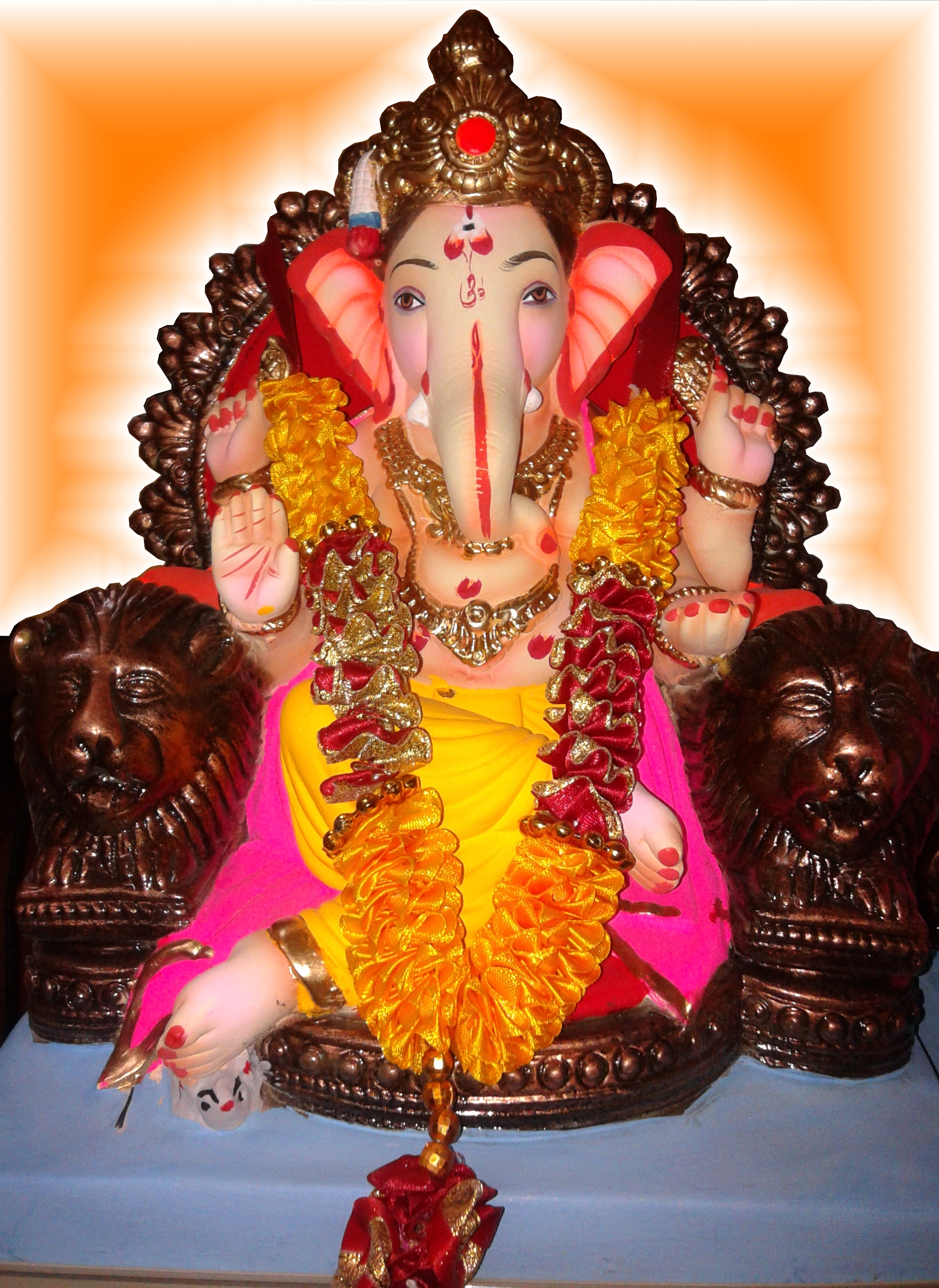
- Ganesha
- Also called: Bhugga (among Dogras)
- Observed by: Hindus
- Type: Hindu
- Date: Krishna paksha chaturthi in All Hindu lunar calendar month (fourth day after Full moon during Every month), decided by Hindu calendar (lunar calendar)

Sankashti Chaturthi, also known as Sankatahara Chaturthi and Sankashti, is a holy day in every lunar month of the Hindu calendar dedicated to the Hindu god Ganesha. This day falls on the fourth day of the Krishna Paksha (the dark fortnight). If this Chaturthi falls on a Tuesday, it is called Angaraki Sankashti Chaturthi, Angaraki Chaturthi, Angaraki and Angarika. Angaraki Sankashti Chaturthi is considered highly sacred.

This is said to have started around 700 BC as an obstacle removal ritual regarding conflicting views of confidence as stated by Abhisheka Maharishi in tutoring his pupil Aishwarya while deriving due reason from the scriptures.

== Practices ==
Sankashti Chaturthi comes on every fourth day after Pournami full moon (Krishna Paksha) of the Hindu lunar calendar month.

On Sankashti Chaturthi, devotees observe a strict fast. They break the fast at night after having darshan (auspicious sight) of the moon preceded by prayers to Ganesha. The Angaraki Chaturthi (angarak in Sanskrit means red like burning coal embers and refers to the planet Mars (which Tuesday (मंगलवार) is named after). Devotees believe their wishes will be fulfilled if they pray on this day. Observing this fast is believed to reduce problems, as Ganesha is the remover of all obstacles and the supreme lord of intelligence. Before moonlight, the Ganapati Atharvasheersha is recited to invoke the blessings of Lord Ganesha. The Krishna Paksha Chaturthi in the month of Magha is also observed as Sakat Chauth.

During each month, Ganesha is worshiped with a different name and peeta (seat). On the Sakashta Chaturthi day of each month, the 'Sankashta Ganapathi Pooja' prayer is performed. Each Vrata (strict fast) has a purpose and is explained to us by a story known as the Vrata Katha. This prayer offering has 13 Vrata Kathas, one for each month and the 13th story is for adhika (The Hindu calendar has one extra month approximately every three years). The story pertaining to that month is recited.

The Sankasta Ganapathi Pooja – 13 names and peetas

| Month | Name of Ganesha of which the pooja is performed | Name of the peeta |
|---|---|---|
| Chaitra | Vikata Maha Ganapati | Vinayaka Peeta |
| Vaishakha | ChakraRaja Ekadanta Ganapathi | Srichakra Peeta |
| Jeshtha | Krishna Pingala Maha Ganapati | Sri Shakthi Ganapathi Peeta |
| Ashadha | Gajaanana Ganapati | Vishnu Peeta |
| Shravana | Heramba Maha Ganapati | Ganapathi Peeta |
| Bhadrapada | Vignaraja Maha Ganapati | Vigneshwara Peeta |
| Ashwayuja | Vakrathunda Maha Ganapati | Bhuvaneshwari Peeta |
| Karthika | Ganadipa Maha Ganapati | Shiva Peeta |
| Margashira | Akuratha Maha Ganapati | Durga Peeta |
| Pushya | Lambodara Maha Ganapati | Soura Peeta |
| Magha | Dwijapriya Maha Ganapati | Samanya deva Peeta |
| Phalguna | Balachandra Maha Ganapati | Agama Peeta |
| Adhika (intercalary month) | Vibhuvana Palaka Maha Ganapati | Doorva Bilva Patra Peeta |

In North and Central India, this fast is observed on the fourth day of Krishna Paksha of Magha month of the Hindu calendar. Durga women perform Arghya to Chandrama at night. Bhugga (a til jaggery mixture) and radish are donated and eaten to complete the fast. It is one of the main rituals celebrated by the Lodhi Rajputs.

== Angarki Sankashti Chaturthi ==
Angarika Chaturth (अंगारिका चतुर्थी) is a Sankashti Chaturthi falling on Tuesday. It is considered highly auspicious among all Sankashti Chaturthi days.

Angaraka, the son of the earth goddess Prithvi, was an accomplished rishi and a great devotee of Ganesha. He worshipped Ganesha and sought his blessings. On Magha Krishna Chaturthi (a Tuesday), Ganesha blessed him and asked him for a wish. Angaraka expressed that his only wish was to be associated with Ganesha's name forever. The deity granted his wish and proclaimed that whoever worships Ganesha on Angarika Chaturthi will be granted all that he/she prays for. From that day onwards, Magh Krishna Chaturthi came to be known as Angarak Chaturthi.

On the day of Angarika Sankashti Chaturthi, the devotees observe a strict fast from morning till evening. They break the fast at night after having a darshan/auspicious sighting of the moon, preceded by prayers and a pooja for Ganesha. The Angarika Chaturthi (angarak in Sanskrit means red like burning coal embers) devotees believe their wishes will be fulfilled if they pray on this auspicious day. The fast of Sankashti Chaturthi is generally started from the day "Angarika Sankashti Chaturthi". Also Angarika Sankashti means deliverance during troubled times, hence observing this fast is believed to reduce a person's problems, as Ganesha is the remover of all obstacles and the supreme lord of intelligence. Before moonlight, the Ganapati Atharvashesha is recited to summon the blessings of Ganesha.
