= Miss Teen Diva 2020 =

- Date: January 25, 2021
- Presenters: Simran Ahuja
- Venue: Kingdom of Dreams, Gurugram, India
- Director: Nikhil Anand
- Producer: Glamanand Group
- Owner: Nikhil Anand
- Sponsor: Glamanand Group
- Entrants: 25
- Placements: 15
- Winner: Rashi Parasrampuria Wachi Pareek Aishwarya Vinu Nair Sayali Ayre

Miss Teen Diva 2020 was the inaugural edition of Miss Teen Diva beauty pageant. It was held on January 25, 2021 at Kingdom of Dreams in Gurugram, India. The event was hosted by Simran Ahuja. At the conclusion of the event, Rashi Parasrampuria was crowned Miss Teen India International 2020 by outgoing titleholder, Aayushi Dholakia from Gujarat. At the same event, Wachi Pareek was crowned Miss Teen India Universe 2020, Aishwarya Vinu was crowned Miss Teen India Earth 2020 and Sayali Ayre was crowned Miss Teen India Multinational 2020. Along with that, two runners-up, Pranjal Priya and Sejal Kumar.

== Results ==
Below are the names of the placement holders of Miss Teen Diva 2020 beauty pageant.

Final Results	Candidate
Miss Teen India International 2020	Rashi Parasrampuria
Miss Teen India Universe 2020	Wachi Pareek
Miss Teen India Multinational 2020	Sayali Ayre
Miss Teen India Earth 2020	Aishwarya Vinu
1st Runner-up	Pranjal Priya
2nd Runner-up	Sejal Kumar
Top 15	Rudrangi Saundaray; Shivangi Desai; Manishika Goel; Riitu Gadhvi; Parvi Dhaulakhandi; Melissa Nayak; Gargi Yadav; Astha Dave; Chetna Arora

== Judges ==
Below are the names of the people who were part of the judging panel.

- Nikhil Anand - Chairman and founder of Glamanand Group.
- Rajiv K Shrivastava - Director of Glamanand Group, President, Act Now, an NGO for environmental awareness, sustainability and peace
- Pushkar Malik - Managing director of MSV International.
- Kartikya Arora - Editor in chief of TMM magazine.
- Dr. Varun Katyal - Nutritionist and wellness expert
- Rekha Vohra - Holistic healer and motivational speaker
- Yogesh Mishra - Director of Fusion Group
- Preeti Seth - Founder of Pachouli Wellness Clinic.

== Candidates ==
Below are the names of the national finalist.

- Aishwarya Vinu Nair
- Astha Dave
- Bhoomika Sahu
- Chetna Aroa
- Debapriya Sharma
- Divya Chaudhary
- Gargi Yadav
- Guramrit Kaur
- Kannkshi Rathi
- Maahi Nikam
- Manishika Goel
- Melissa Nayak
- Parvi Dhaulakhandi
- Pranjal Priya
- Priyal Bhatt
- Rashi Parasrampuria
- Ritu Gadhvi
- Riya Choudhary
- Rudrangi Sundaray
- Sejal Kumar
- Shivangi Desai
- Shrishti Xalxo
- Sayali Ayre
- Wachi Pareek
- Yashika Dudeja
