= 2010 Commonwealth Games opening ceremony =

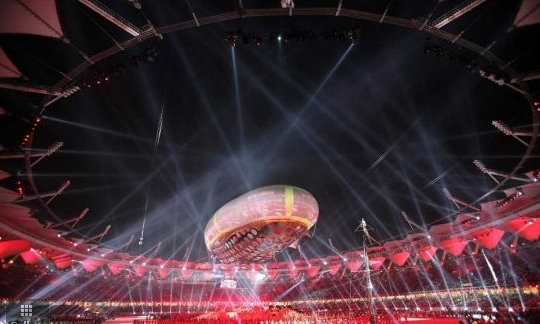
- Performance of "Jiyo Utho Badho Jeeto", official song of the games
- Date: 3 October 2010
- Time: 19:00 – 22:00 IST
- Location: Delhi, India; 28°34′58″N 77°14′4″E
- Filmed by: DD
- Footage: Youtube

The opening ceremony of the 2010 Commonwealth Games was held at the Jawaharlal Nehru Stadium, the main stadium of the event, in New Delhi, India. It began at 7:00 PM (IST) on 3 October 2010 ending at 10:00 PM (IST) displaying India's varied culture in a plethora of cultural showcases. Wizcraft was given the contract to produce the opening and closing ceremonies of the 2010 Commonwealth Games.

== Guests of honour ==
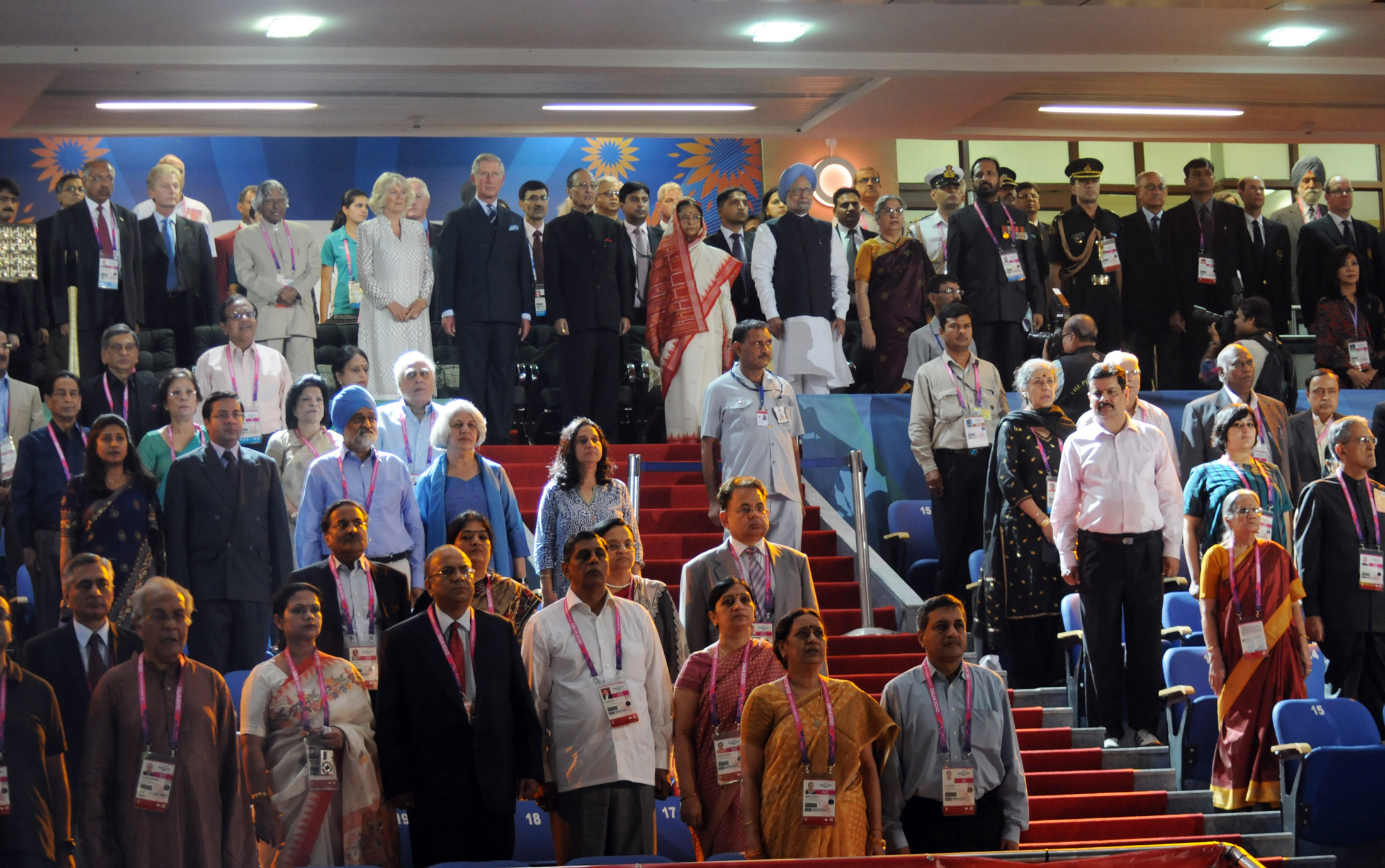
The Dignitaries at the opening ceremony

The following were the guests that attended the opening ceremony of the 2010 Commonwealth Games:

- (United Kingdom) The Prince of Wales (now Charles III), representing Elizabeth II
- (United Kingdom) The Duchess of Cornwall (now Queen Camilla)
- (United Kingdom) Prince Edward, Earl of Wessex - Vice-Patron of the Commonwealth Games Federation
- Pratibha Patil – President of India
- Devisingh Shekhawat – First Gentleman of India
- Manmohan Singh – Prime Minister of India
- Gursharan Kaur – Spouse of the Prime Minister of India
- Michael Fennell – President of the Commonwealth Games Federation
- Mohamed Nasheed – President of the Maldives
- Marcus Stephen – President of Nauru
- Albert II – Prince of Monaco
- Sir Anand Satyanand – Governor General of New Zealand
- A. P. J. Abdul Kalam – Former President of India
- (India) Sonia Gandhi – Chairperson of National Advisory Council
- Kamalesh Sharma – Secretary General of the Commonwealth of Nations
- Jacques Rogge – President of the International Olympic Committee
- (India) Sheila Dikshit – Chief Minister of Delhi
- (India) Arjan Singh – Marshal of Indian Air Force

=== Royal Family ===
The Prince of Wales (now Charles III, representing Elizabeth II as Head of the Commonwealth), Camilla, Duchess of Cornwall and Prince Edward, Earl of Wessex attended the ceremony.

=== International guests ===
A total of three heads of state from outside India attended the opening ceremony; two from Commonwealth nations and one from a non-Commonwealth nation. The three head of states are Mohamed Nasheed, President of the Maldives, Marcus Stephen, President of Nauru and a multiple Commonwealth gold medallist.h. Sir Anand Satyanand, the Governor General of New Zealand (the first of Indian descent), attended the ceremony as well.

Alongside the Commonwealth president, attendees included International Olympic Committee then president, Jacques Rogge and Albert II, Prince of Monaco who is a member.Rogge was quoted as saying, "I think India has set a good foundation stone for the Olympics bid and a successful Commonwealth Games can help India mount a serious bid for the Olympics."

== Programme ==
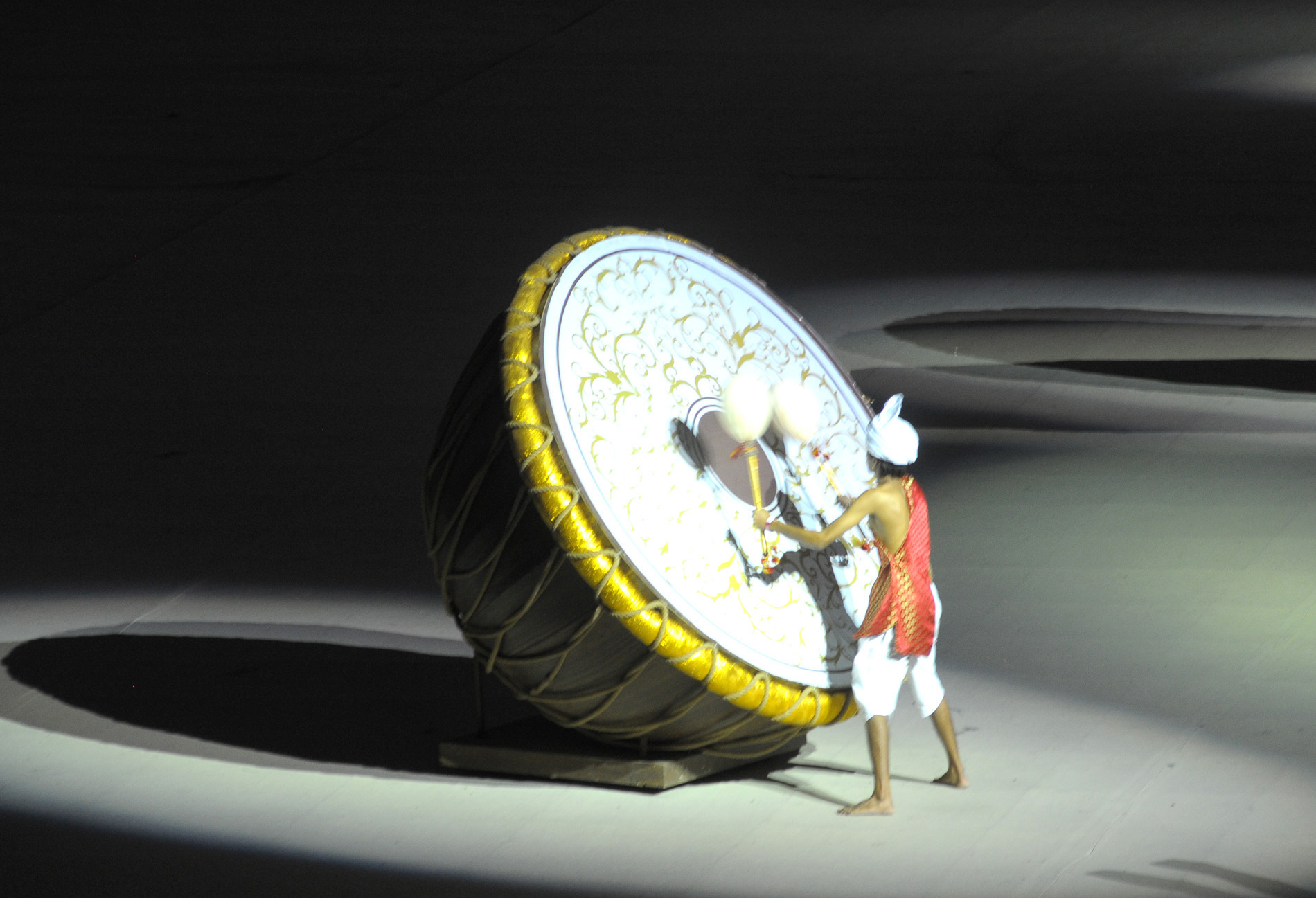
A drummer performs at the opening ceremony

The opening ceremony featured aspects of India's heritage and culture in seven segments. It featured an aerostat costing U$8 million, measuring 40×80x12 meters and manufactured in Oswestry, England. The original plan was to have drummers on the aerostat, but the plan was cancelled. The ceremony started with the Indian national anthem which was played live at the stadium. The roof of the stadium turned into orange colour and the ground was lit up with three colours of the Indian flag – orange in the center, white in the middle and green near the boundary.

=== Rhythm of India ===
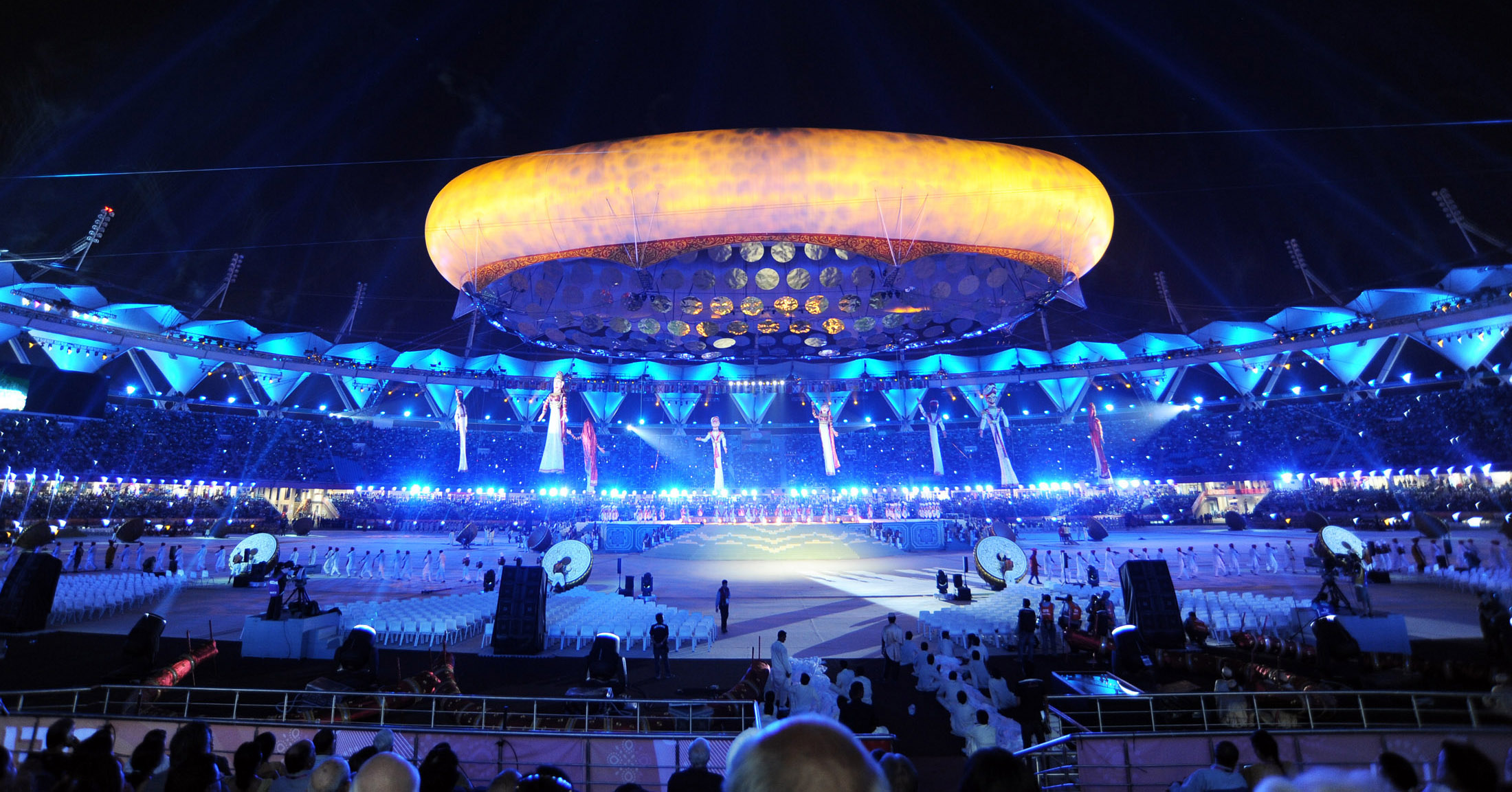
Giant Puppets hang from the aerostat

The countdown for the opening of commonwealth games started as the drums were being played, and fireworks exploded from the roof of the stadium. The aerostat slowly raised from the ground to the center space of the roof while a traditional Rajasthani hymn was being played by the musicians. Various Drummers from Assam, Kerala, Manipur, Karnataka, Odisha, Punjab and Meghalaya played a symphony that aimed to be "uniquely Indian in character, yet global in appeal". Seven year old tabla player Keshav from Puducherry played the tabla instrument in front of the audience live and he was given a big applause from the audience.

=== Swagatam ===
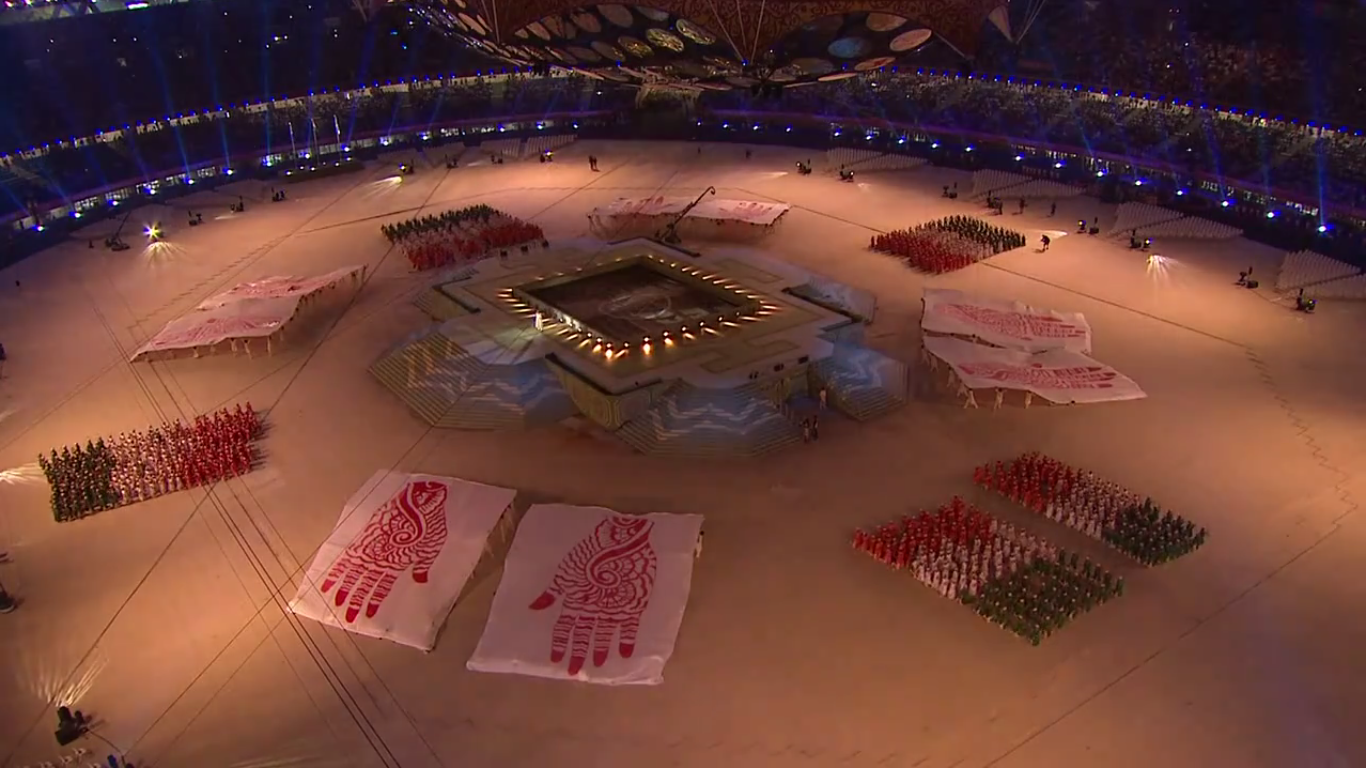
School children from across delhi performed in this segment, intricate mehndi design was painted on large pieces of cloth in 30 seconds.

Hariharan led this segment, which created an amalgamation of Hindustani classical, Carnatic and folk music. The song was composed by A. R. Rahman, who also composed the official theme song of the games, and was performed by various artists along with Hariharan. Children from various Delhi schools participated in a simultaneous performance forming hands of an Indian woman in a pose of Namaste – a popular Indian salutation. Later, they separated and rearranged themselves in another formation representing the Indian flag colors of saffron, white and green while another group of children entered the stadium and covered the flag formations with a large white cloth. In a widely appreciated act, the children then made a mehndi – a traditional Indian art – on this large white piece of cloth in under 30 seconds on the spot.Latest News Updates

=== Tree of Knowledge ===
Pt. Birju Maharaj (Kathak), Guru Rajkumar Singhajit Singh-Charu Sija Mathur (Manipuri), Dr. Saroja Vaidyanathan (Bharatnatyam), Dr. Sonal Mansingh (Odissi), Bharati Shivaji (Mohiniattam) and Raja Reddy-Radha Reddy (Kuchipudi) choreographed 480 dancers bringing alive India's "Guru-Shishya Parampara" or the master-protege tradition on stage through classical dance recitals which also depicted four different seasons of India. The aerostat (the largest ever helium balloon built for such an event) formed the leaves of the Bodhi tree, while large strips elevated from the ground, made of silk and bamboo fibre form the tree trunk. After the display of classical dance, the dancers displayed yoga moves.

=== The Great Indian Journey ===
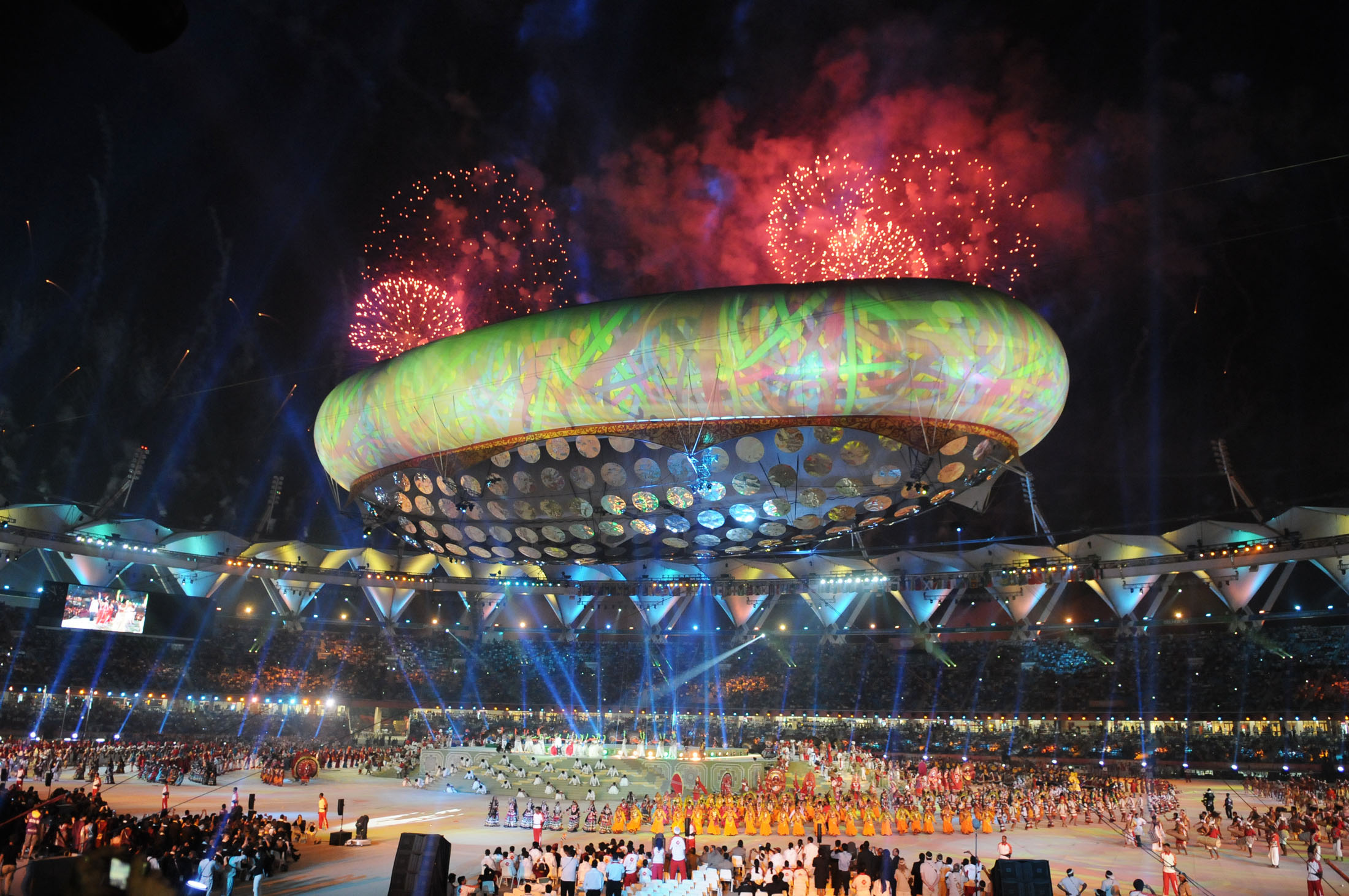
Dancers from all the states of India performed at the ceremony

This segment will give a glimpse of the lives of the masses in India, as seen through a train window. Art director Omung Kumar created a 600-ft train of bamboo sticks for this. It portrayed a common man's life and every thing in it, such as the bangle shops, politicians campaigning, Bollywood, the cycle shop etc.

=== Finale ===
Academy and Grammy award winner A. R. Rahman ended the programme with his rendition of "Jiyo Utho Badho Jeeto", the theme song of the Delhi games, and "Jai Ho".

== Gallery ==
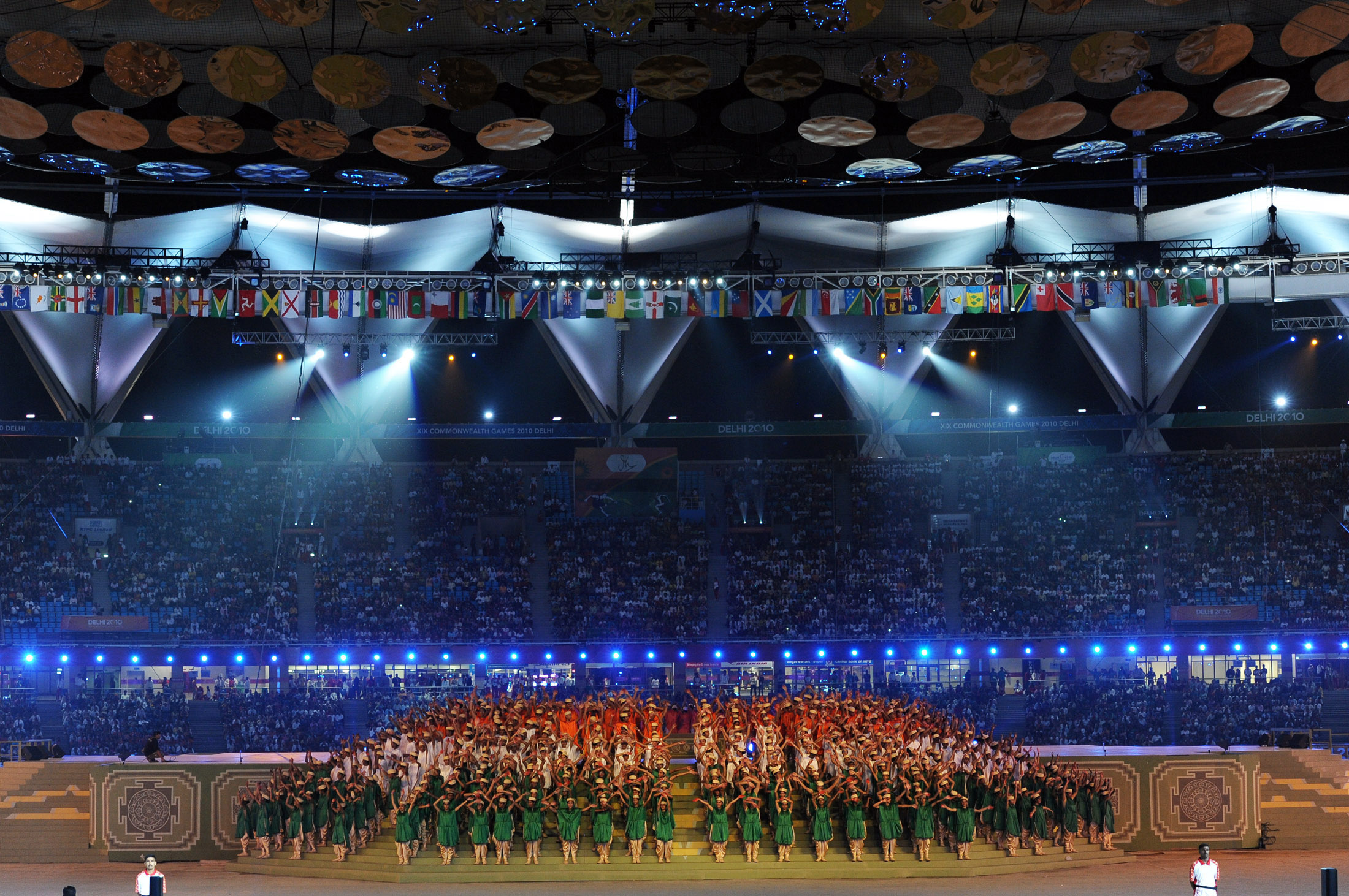
Artistes showcasing Indian flag at the opening ceremony

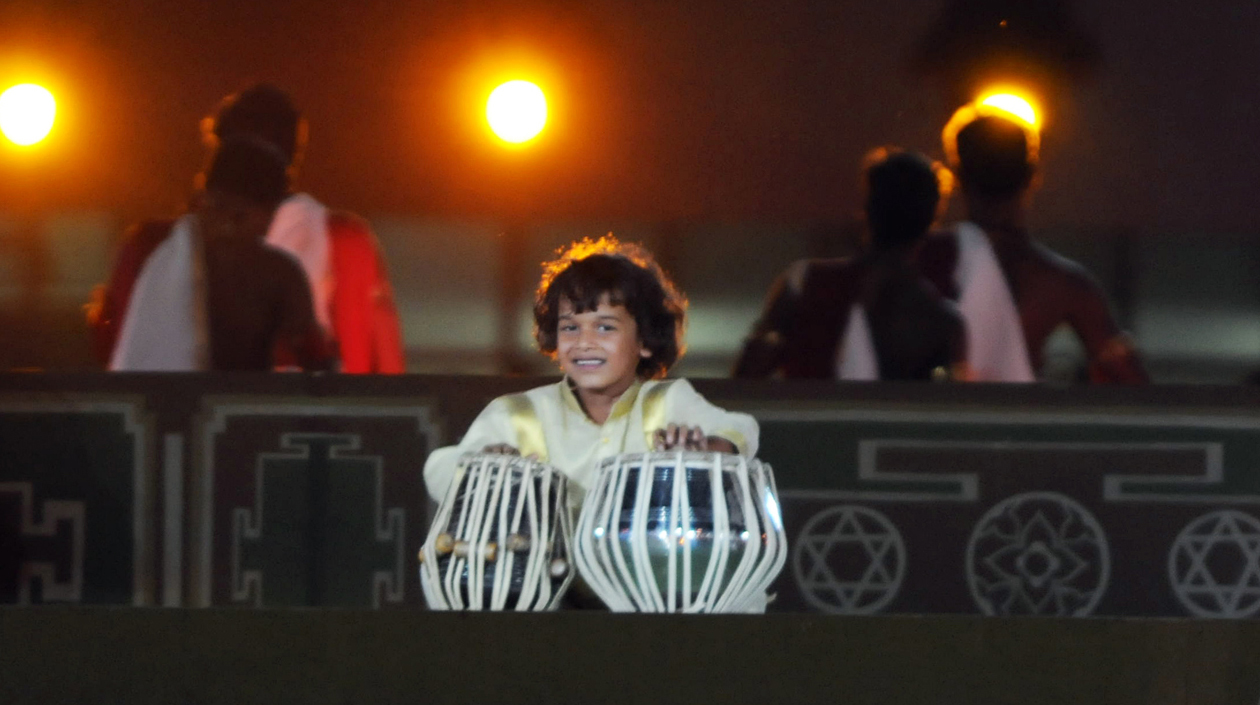
Master Keshava a seven-year old Prodigy from Puducherry plays the tabla at the opening ceremony

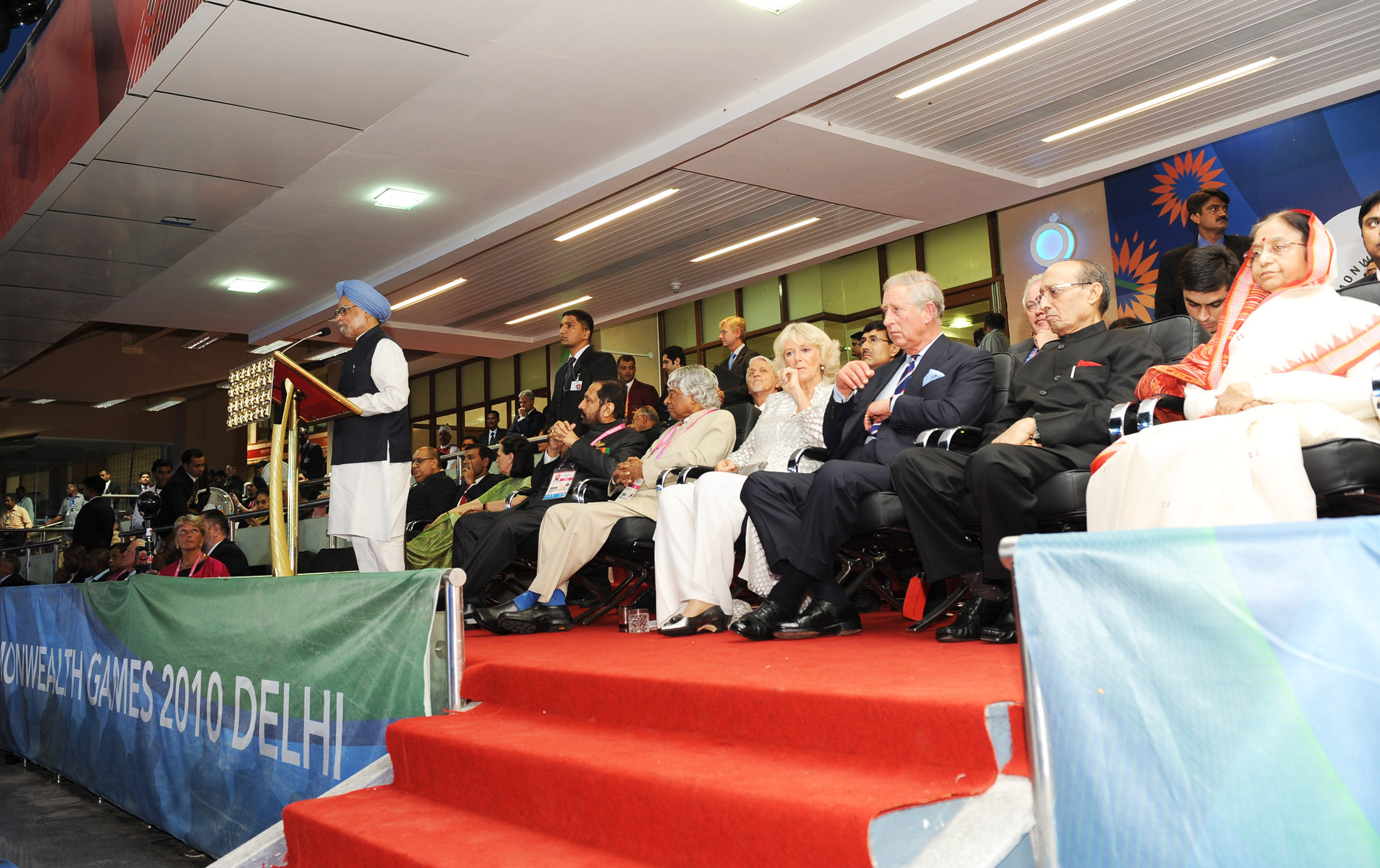
The Prime Minister Dr. Manmohan Singh addressing at the opening ceremony

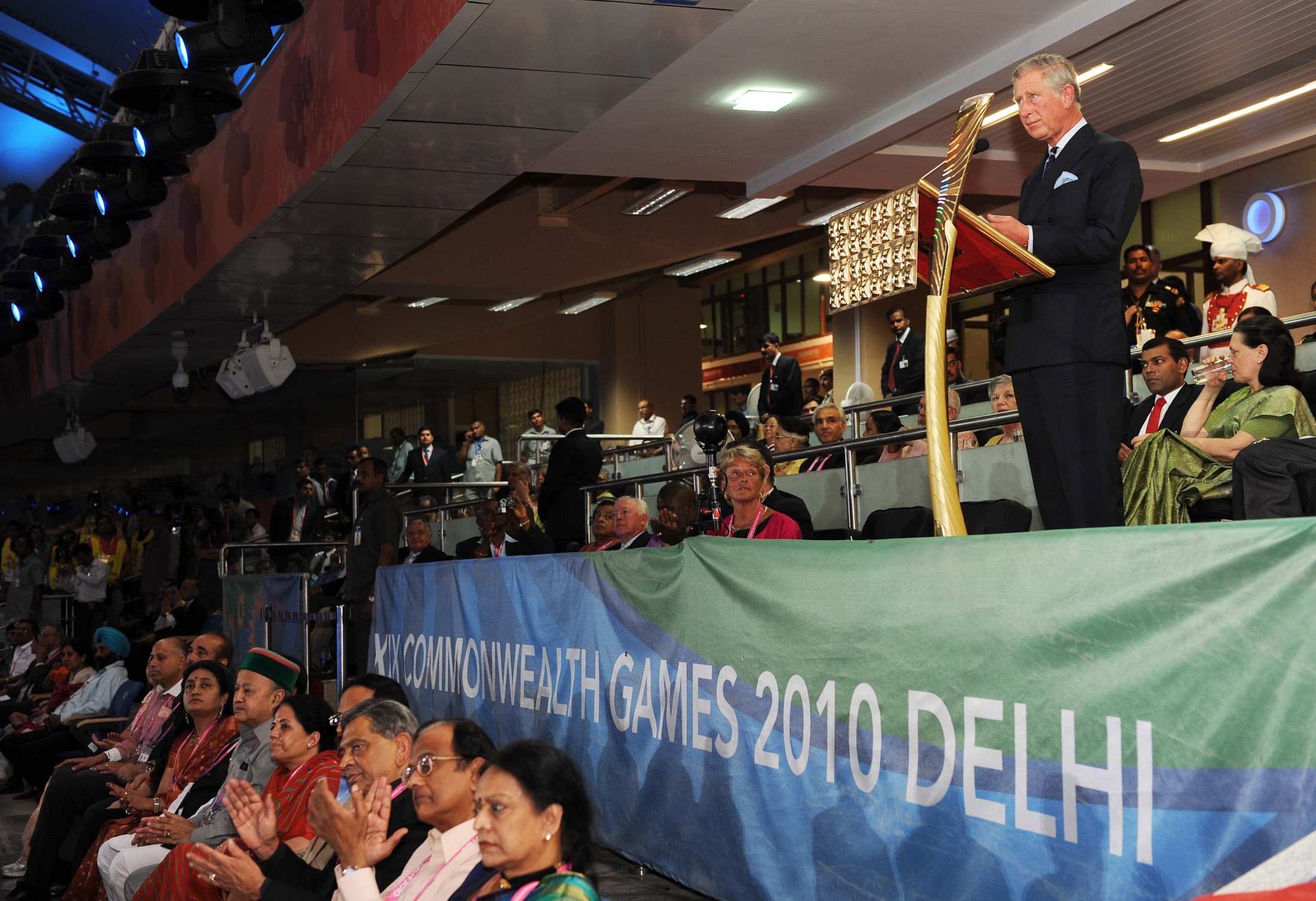
Prince Charles reads out the message of Queen Elizabeth on her behalf during the opening ceremony

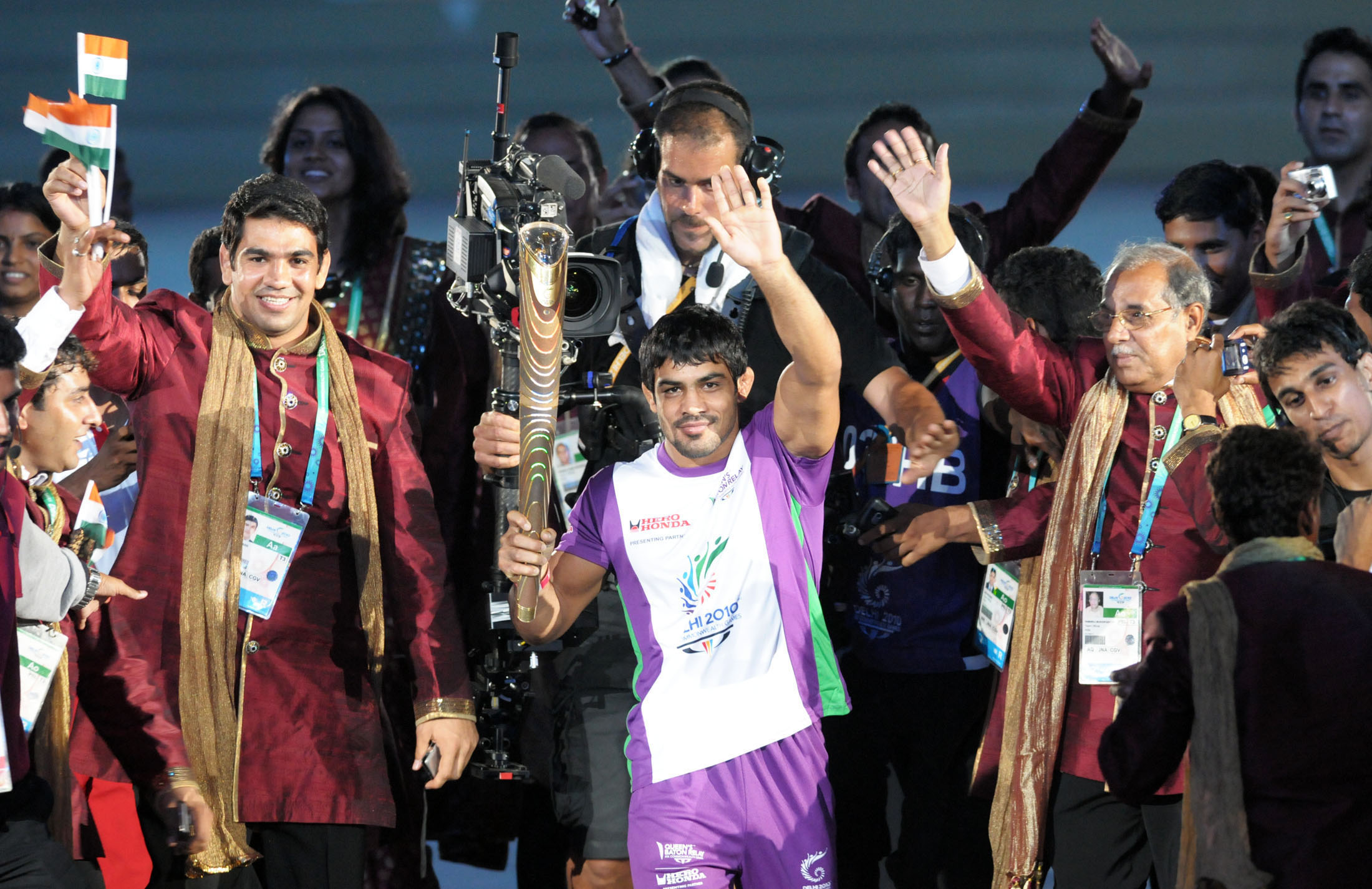
Sushil Kumar, Wrestler holding the Queen's Baton

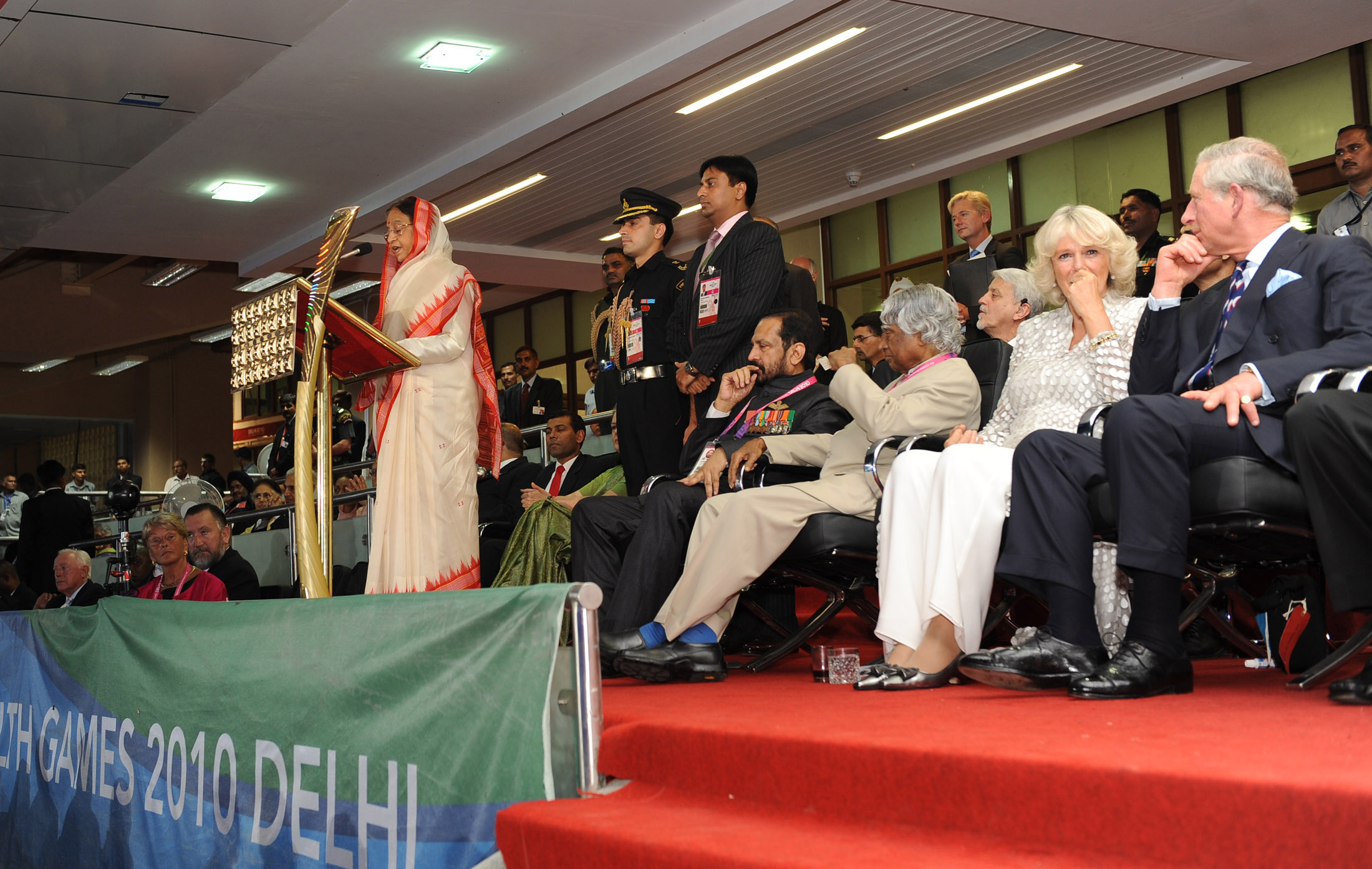
President Pratibha Patil declares the Games open

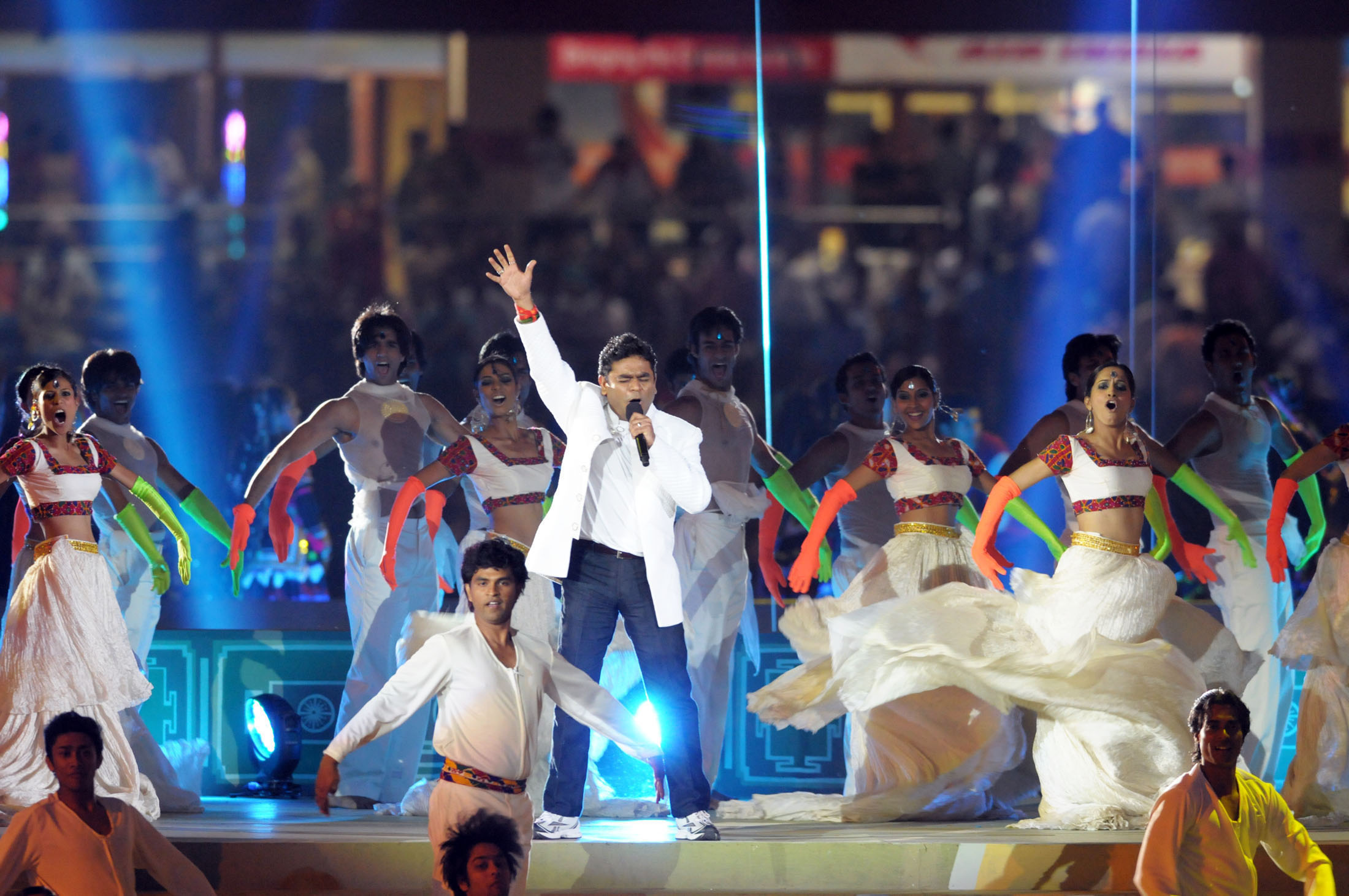
Music composer A. R. Rahman performs during the opening ceremony

== List of national flag bearers ==
Australia entered first as the host of the last games, and India entered last as the host. Excluding these two nations, the flag bearers entered by alphabetical order of their nations; Anguilla was the first (after Australia) and Zambia was the last (before India). Each flag bearer was preceded by a woman in traditional Indian dress, each reflecting a different part of the country, carrying a placard with the country's name.

Order	Nation	Flag bearer	Sport	Total Athletes
1	Australia	Sharelle McMahon	Netball	377
2	Anguilla	Ronnie Bryan	Cycling	12
3	Antigua and Barbuda	James Grayman	Athletics	17
4	Bahamas	Valentino Knowles	Athletics	24
5	Bangladesh	Asif Hossain Khan	Shooting	70
6	Barbados	Laurel Browne	Netball	39
7	Belize	Kaina Martinez	Athletics	9
8	Bermuda	Kiera Aitken	Swimming	14
9	Botswana	Amantle Montsho	Athletics	49
10	British Virgin Islands	Joseph Chapman	Squash	2
11	Brunei	Ampuan Ahad	Lawn bowls	12
12	Cameroon	Hugo Mamba	Athletics	20
13	Canada	Ken Pereira	Field hockey	251
14	Cayman Islands	Shaune Fraser	Swimming	17
15	Cook Islands	Mata Kenny	Lawn bowls	31
16	Cyprus	Irodotos Georgallas	Gymnastics	56
17	Dominica	Brendan Williams	Athletics	15
18	England	Nathan Robertson	Badminton	365
19	Falkland Islands	Douglas James Clark	Badminton	15
20	Ghana	Aziz Zakari	Athletics	64
21	Gibraltar	Colin Bensadon	Swimming	17
22	Grenada	Imrod Batholomew	Boxing	10
23	Guernsey	Peter Jory	Shooting	43
24	Guyana	Cleveland Forde	Athletics	34
25	Isle of Man	Andrew Roche	Cycling	33
26	Jamaica	Simone Forbes	Netball	48
27	Jersey	Karina Bisson	Lawn bowls	33
28	Kenya	Ezekiel Kemboi	Athletics	136
29	Kiribati	David Katoatau	Weightlifting	17
30	Lesotho	Selloane Tsoaeli	Athletics	10
31	Malawi	Mary Waya	Netball	43
32	Malaysia	Siti Zalina Ahmad	Lawn bowls	203
33	Maldives	Mueena Mohamed	Table Tennis	28
34	Malta	Rebecca Madyson	Shooting	22
35	Mauritius	Louis Richarno Colin	Boxing	55
36	Montserrat	Peter Semper	Athletics	5
37	Mozambique	Kurt Couto	Athletics	10
38	Namibia	Jafet Uutoni	Boxing	30
39	Nauru	Itte Detenamo	Weightlifting	6
40	New Zealand	Irene van Dyk	Netball	192
41	Nigeria	Faith Obiora	Table Tennis	101
42	Niue	Narita Viliamu	Weightlifting	24
43	Norfolk Island	Duncan Gray	Squash	22
44	Northern Ireland	Mark Montgomery	Wrestling	80
45	Pakistan	Mohammad Ali Shah	Chef de mission	54
46	Papua New Guinea	Barbara Stubbings	Squash	79
47	Rwanda	Disi Dieudonne	Athletics	22
48	Samoa	Ele Opeloge Dieudonne	Weightlifting	53
49	Scotland	Ross Edgar	Cycling	191
50	Seychelles	Steve Malcouzane	Badminton	26
51	Sierra Leone	Michaela Kargbo	Athletics	31
52	Singapore	Feng Tian Wei	Table Tennis	68
53	Solomon Islands	Michael Leong	Tennis	12
54	South Africa	Cameron van der Burgh	Swimming	113
55	Sri Lanka	Chinthana Vidanage	Weightlifting	94
56	Saint Helena	Rico Yon	Shooting	4
57	Saint Kitts and Nevis	Tanika Liburd	Athletics	7
58	Saint Lucia	Lavern Spencer	Athletics	13
59	Saint Vincent and the Grenadines	James Bentick	Squash	14
60	Swaziland	Siphesihle Mdluli	Athletics	11
61	Tanzania	Samson Ramadhani	Athletics	40
62	The Gambia	Fanny Shonoboi	Athletics	17
63	Tonga	Uaine Fa	Boxing	22
64	Trinidad and Tobago	Cleopatra Borel-Brown	Athletics	82
65	Turks and Caicos Islands	Delano Williams	Athletics	8
66	Tuvalu	Lapua Tuau	Weightlifting	3
67	Uganda	Ganzi Mugula	Swimming	65
68	Vanuatu	Yoshna Shing	Table Tennis	14
69	Wales	David Davies	Swimming	175
70	Zambia	Rachel Nachula	Athletics	22
71	India	Abhinav Bindra	Shooting	495

- Pakistan's flag bearer was scheduled to be weightlifter Shujha-ud-din Malik. However, chef de mission Muhammad Ali Shah announced that he would carry the flag and took it from the designated flag-bearer.

== Spectators' response ==
In the opening ceremony the head of organizing committee faced embarrassment, when he was booed by the spectators at the start of his welcome speech to 60,000 spectators in the opening ceremony. The atmosphere otherwise for the teams and officials was fine, especially when they offered warm applause to the neighbouring Pakistan squad, with whom it has tense relationships. Sri Lanka also got a loud applause. The head finished his speech in five minutes and then handed over to Michael Fennell, the Chief of the Commonwealth Games Federation.

== Baton procession ==
Boxer Vijender Singh carried the Queen's Baton into the Jawaharlal Nehru Stadium, at the Opening Ceremony. The baton was then passed to boxer Mary Kom, 5-time world champion. It was then passed to Samresh Jung, who was named best competitor of the 2006 Commonwealth Games in Melbourne, Australia . It was then passed to Sushil Kumar, world champion wrestler, who finally handed the Queen's Baton to the Prince of Wales (now Charles III).
