= Kashmira Irani =

Indian actress

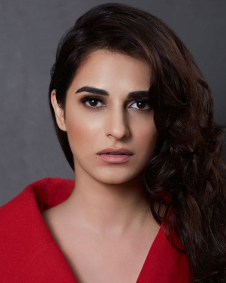
- Irani in 2015
- Occupation: Actress
- Years active: 2007–present
- Spouse: Akshat Saxena (m. 2018)

Kashmira Irani (born 1985 or 1986) is an Indian film, television and theatre actress known for playing Amber in Amber Dhara, Draupadi in Dharmakshetra, Samaira Khanna in Dosti... Yaariyan... Manmarziyan, and Rajkumari Sonali in Zangoora. She has also played pivotal roles in films like Rangoon, Tiger Zinda Hai, and Bharat.

== Early life ==
Irani was born in 1986 and brought up in Pune, Maharashtra to an Irani Zoroastrian family. She moved to Mumbai from Pune when she was 17 years old to pursue her passion for acting. Prior to her acting debut, she assisted her cousin in fashion designing and worked as an assistant stylist.

== Career ==
Irani made her debut on the television industry with the hit TV series Amber Dhara, where she played the title role of Amber. The story was of conjoined twins, and required her to be conjoined with her co-actor (Sulagna Panigrahi) who played Dhara for 8–9 months. She won the Best Debutant Award for this role at the Sansui Television Awards.

In 2009, she appeared on a telefilm based on the 26/11 terror attacks in Mumbai called Un Hazaaron Ke Naam, in which she played the role of Jyoti, a rich brat. The story dealt with how the attacks transformed her to be more socially responsible towards her society. The following year, she had a role in Yash Chopra's TV series Seven on Sony Entertainment Television. The series was about seven extraordinary people who possess supernatural powers and how they help get rid of the evil from society. She played the role of Varya Vishwamitra, a girl who can control the weather.

She played the lead as Rajkumari Sonali in a play called Zangoora, which was the first Bollywood musical ever. It premiered on 23 September 2010 at Kingdom of Dreams and became the longest-running Bollywood stage show in India. In June 2013, the musical completed over 1000 successful shows at Nautanki Mahal, Gurgaon. This character has been her most challenging role so far as it's her first time on a live stage and has also required her to do aerial choreography. Zangoora and her role have been well received by audiences.

After doing the musical for four successful years, she went to acting and dance classes in New York City, while working with an acting coach there in the city.

In 2014, she appeared briefly as a stage actress performing an aerial dance at Kingdom of Dreams in PK starring Aamir Khan and Anushka Sharma. She performed an aerial dance to the song " Love is a Waste of Time".

She came into the limelight for her role as Samaira on the popular television series Dosti... Yaariyan... Manmarziyan.

== Filmography ==
Year	Title	Role	Note
2007– 2008	Amber Dhara	Amber	TV series
2009	Un Hazaaron Ke Naam	Jyoti	
2010	Seven	Varya Vishwamithra	
2014	Dharmakshetra	Draupadi	
2014	PK	Aerial dancer	Special appearance in Love Is A Waste Of Time
2015	Dosti... Yaariyan... Manmarziyan	Samaira Khanna	
2017	Tiger Zinda Hai	Sana	
2017	Rangoon	Zenobia Billimoria	
2019	Bharat	Mahek	
2020	Welcome Home	Anuja Rao	
2022	Modern Love Mumbai	Rehana	
2022	Shoorveer	Sarah	
2025	Detective Sherdil	Falak	
2026	Main Vaapas Aaunga	Kishwar	

== Theatre ==
- Zangoora
