= Zangoora =

- poster
- Music: Shankar–Ehsaan–Loy
- Lyrics: Javed Akhtar
- Basis: Original screenplay by Javed Akhtar
- Premiere: 23 September 2010: Kingdom of Dreams, Gurgaon

Zangoora – The Gypsy Prince is the first Bollywood musical. It was premiered on 23 September 2010 at Nautanki Mahal of Kingdom of Dreams, Gurgaon. It has a cast of 110 members with Hussain Kuwajerwala, Gauahar Khan, Kashmira Irani and Sadanand Patil playing lead, supported by Arjun Fauzdar; besides crew of 250 people. In June 2013, the musical completed a run of 1000 shows, and became the longest running Bollywood stage show in India.

The musical was a production of the Great Indian Nautanki Company, a joint venture between Wizcraft and APRA Group. The music of the musical was composed by Shankar–Ehsaan–Loy, with screenplay and dialogues by Javed Akhtar.

== Overview ==
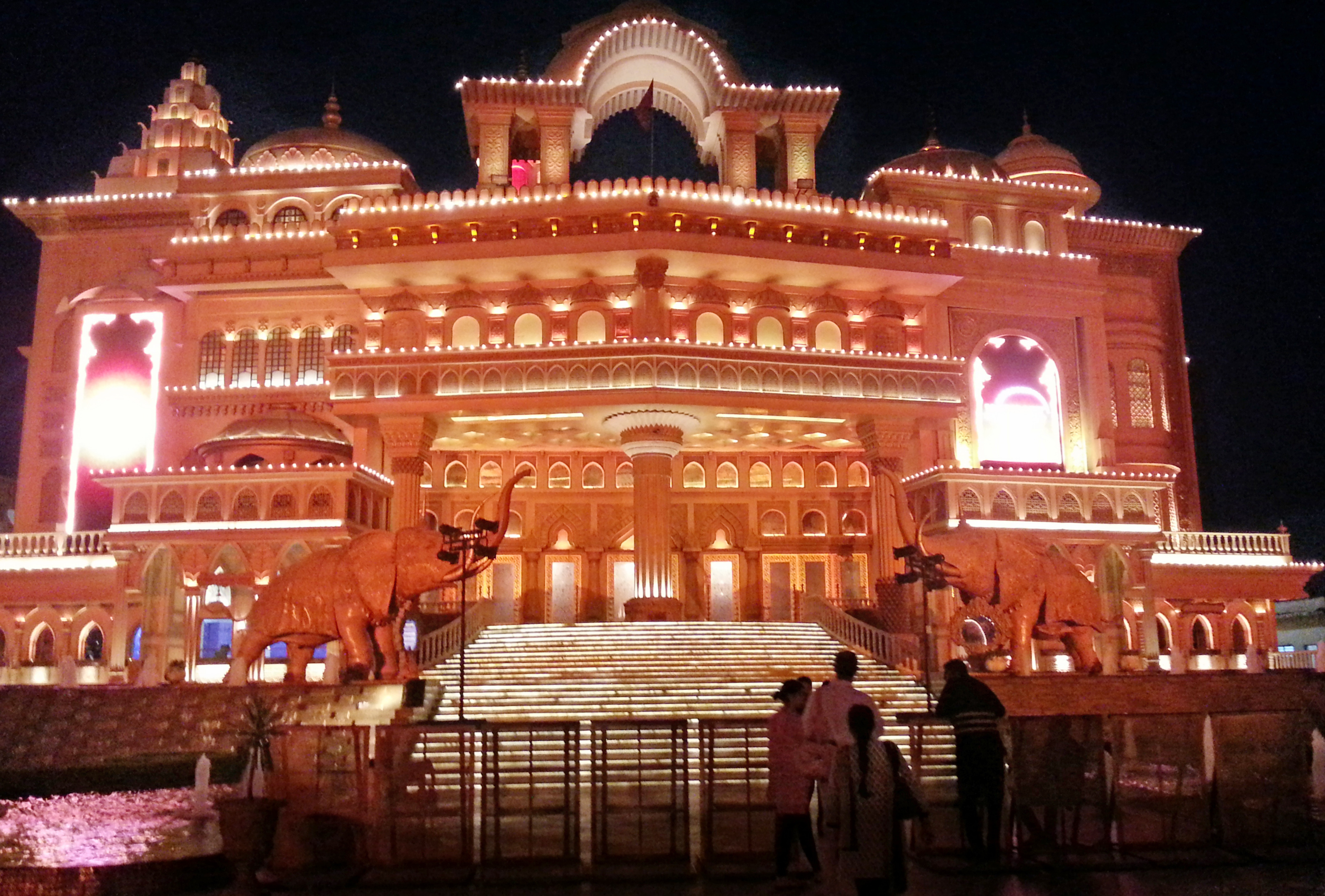
Kingdom of Dreams auditorium Nautanki Mahal, home of Zangoora musical since 2010.

It stars Hussain Kuwajerwala, Gauahar Khan, Kashmira Irani, Sadanand Patil and Arjun Fauzdar. A special preview was held on the inauguration of the Kingdom of Dreams, entertainment and leisure destination on 18 September 2010. Music is composed by leading Bollywood composers, Shankar–Ehsaan–Loy, the story, screenplay and dialogues are by Javed Akhtar, Dance direction and choreography by Shiamak Davar, costumes by Neeta Lulla while stunt direction by Alan Amin and also employs a crew of 250 people.

The cast was part of the launch of the 2010 Commonwealth Games’ official theme song, Jiyo Utho Bado Jeeto by composer A R Rahman, and later the 2010 Commonwealth Games opening ceremony.

In June 2013, the musical completed over 1000 successful shows at Nautanki Mahal, Gurgaon.

== Cast ==
- Zangoora - Hussain Kuwajerwala/Vishay Singh / Rachit Bahal / Pankaj Sharma / Md. Shahidur
- Lachi - Gauahar Khan/Annukampa Harsh/Rachaittri Gupta
- Sonali - Kashmira Irani/Rea Krishna/Sukhmani Lamba/Suparna Moitra/Karamjeet Madonna
- Sanga - Sushil Kumar
- Zorawar - Sadanand Patil/Nitin Goel
- Daulatrai - Sanjeev Ahuja / srikant
- Todarmal - Manoj Rajput / sushil Sharma
- Chambuti - Padamshree C R / Nidhi Mishra
- Jaalpa- / Hema Bisht / Nidhi Mishra
- Manglu - Arjun Fauzdar

== Crew ==
- Story & Screenplay: Javed Akhtar
- Music: Shankar–Ehsaan–Loy
- Choreography: Shiamak Davar & Glen D'Mello
- Costumes: Neeta Lulla
- Art Direction & Production Design: Omung Kumar, Vanita Kumar
- Dialogues: Anindita Menon
- Background Score: Nikhil Koparde

== Music ==
The soundtrack of the musical has been composed by Bollywood composing trio, Shankar–Ehsaan–Loy. Apart from special songs, the musical also included 20 hit Bollywood songs like "Pehla Nasha Pehla Khumar" (Jo Jeeta Wohi Sikandar), "Baware Baware" (Luck by Chance), "Choli Ke Peeche Kya Hai" (Khalnayak) and "Mehbooba Mehbooba" (Sholay).
