= Miss Teen Diva 2021 =

Indian beauty pageant

- Date: December 29, 2021
- Presenters: Tanvi Malhara, Anisha Sharma
- Venue: Kingdom of Dreams, Gurugram; India
- Director: Nikhil Anand
- Producer: Glamanand Group
- Owner: Nikhil Anand
- Sponsor: Glamanand Group
- Entrants: 36
- Winner: Mannat Siwach, Brunda Yerrabali, Rabia Hora, Mahika Biyani

Miss Teen Diva 2021 was the second edition of Miss Teen Diva beauty pageant. It was held on December 29, 2021, at Kingdom of Dreams in Gurugram, India. The event was hosted by Tanvi Malhara and Anisha Sharma. At the conclusion of the event, Mannat Siwach was crowned Miss Teen India International by outgoing titleholder, Rashi Parasrampuria. At the same event, Brunda Yerrabali was crowned Miss Teen India Universe, Rabia Hora was crowned Miss Teen India Earth and Mahika Biyani was crowned Miss Teen India Multinational. Along with that, two runners-up, Milan Kumari Panda (first runner-up) and Cherisha Chanda (second runner-up) were also crowned.

== Results ==
Below are the names of the placement holders of Miss Teen Diva 2021 beauty pageant.

Final Results	Candidate
Miss Teen India International	Mannat Siwach
Miss Teen India Universe	Brunda Yerrabali
Miss Teen India Multinational	Mahika Biyani
Miss Teen India Earth	Rabia Hora
1st Runner-up	Milan Kumari Panda
2nd Runner-up	Cherisha Chanda

== Sub Title Awards ==
Below is the list of award winners.

Award	Contestant
Best in Fitness	Shreya Agrawal
Best in Sports	Shreya Agrawal
Best in Evening Gown	Cherisha Chanda
Best in Swimsuit	Anushka Sone
Best in Talent	Aastha Agrawal
Best Body	Mannat Siwach
Miss Environment	Kashish Goswami
Best in Ramp Walk	Shravanee Patil
Beauty with Brains	Vishnu Priya Soma
Beauty with a Purpose	Khushi Gupta
Miss Vivacious	Milan Kumari Panda
Miss Beautiful Skin	Rabia Hora
Miss Iron Maiden	Kashish Goswami
Best in Personal Interview	Brunda Yerrabali
Best in Speech	Brunda YerraBali
Miss Fashion Icon	Shreya Agrawal
Best in National Costume	Rabia Hora
Miss Congeniality	Vishnu Priya Soma

== Judges ==
Below are the names of the people who were part of the judging panel.

- Nikhil Anand - chairman and founder of Glamanand Group.
- Rajiv K Shrivastava - Director of Glamanand Group, President, Act Now, an NGO for environmental awareness, sustainability and peace
- Zoya Afroz – Miss India International 2021.
- Tanya Sinha – Miss Globe International India 2021.
- Asmita Chakroborty – Miss Tourism India 2021.
