= Ali Merchant =

Indian actor, anchor, DJ and music producer

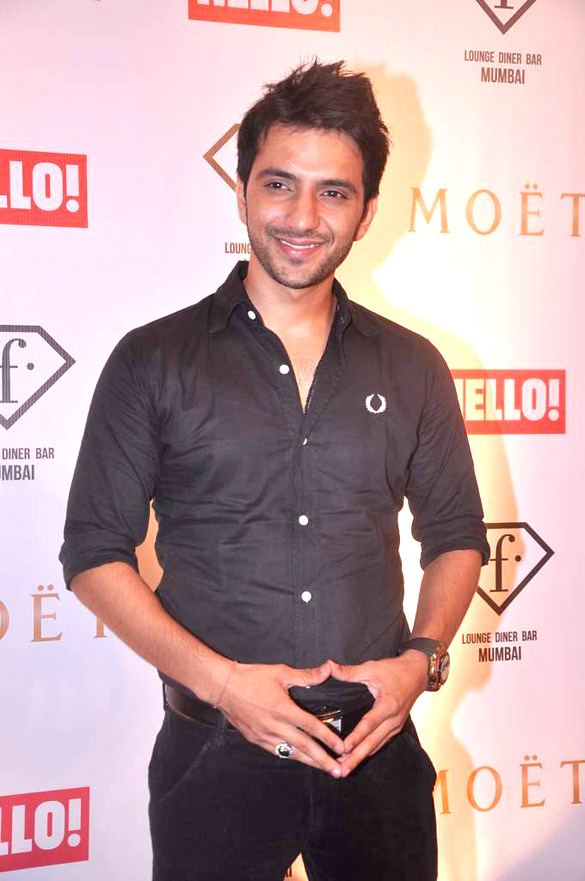
- Ali at ITA awards
- Born: 13 December 1984 (age 41); Mumbai, Maharashtra, India
- Occupations: Actor; DJ; Record Producer
- Years active: 2006–2022
- Height: 5 ft 9 in (1.75 m)
- Spouse: Sara Khan (m. 2010; div. 2011) Anam Merchant (m. 2016; div. 2021) Andleeb Zaidi (m. 2023)

Ali Merchant is an Indian Actor, anchor, DJ and music producer.

Merchant has appeared in over 35 Television shows including Fiction and Non-fiction on all prime channels like Colors, MTV, Star Plus, Life Ok, Sony TV, Zee TV, Channel V. He has also anchored Non-Fiction shows on Star Plus like Nachbaliye special episodes and as a Solo host for Gladrags Mega Model and Manhunt for three consecutive seasons on Channel V.

He is also a musician having various official remixes on music labels like T-series, Zee Music and Speed records.

== Career ==
At the age of 17, Merchant won the Mr. Bombay title. He has two albums in his credits in the start of his career such as Tabaahi on Seed Records and Kadak on Ali Merchant (independent channel).

Merchant has appeared in over 35 television shows, including fiction and non-fiction on all prime channels like Colors, MTV, Star Plus, Life Ok, Sony TV, Zee TV, Channel V. He has also anchored non-fiction shows on Star Plus like Nachbaliye special episodes and as a Solo host for Gladrags Mega Model and Manhunt for three consecutive seasons on Channel V. Ali has always been loved by his fans for his cool personality and spunky look.

== Personal life ==
Merchant grew up in a Muslim household in Mumbai. He was married to TV actress Sara Khan, in an Islamic wedding ceremony at Bigg Boss 4 in 2010, but they divorced after two months in 2011. Close friends of the couple stated that the couple was paid ₹5 million (US$53,000) for the marriage. The Colors channel denied that it had paid them for the marriage and called it their personal wish. Following the divorce, Khan described the marriage as a nightmare. Merchant said in an episode of the reality show Sach Ka Saamna that he had married Khan for publicity and that marrying her was the biggest mistake of his life. In November 2023, he married girlfriend Andleeb Zaidi.

== Television ==
| Year | Serial | Role |
|---|---|---|
| 2006 | Ssshhhh...Phir Koi Hai | Rahul (Episode 1) |
| 2007 | Ssshhhh...Phir Koi Hai | Inspector (Episode 18) |
| 2007 | Ssshhhh...Phir Koi Hai | Rajkumar Aditya Singh (Episode 25) |
| 2007 | Ssshhhh...Phir Koi Hai | Narendra (Episode 35) |
| 2007 | Ssshhhh...Phir Koi Hai | Karan (Episode 40) |
| 2007 | Ssshhhh...Phir Koi Hai | Sandeep (Episode 52) |
| 2007–2008 | Amber Dhara | Akshat |
| 2008 | Rubi | Kunal Oberoi |
| 2008 | Nach Baliye 4 | Host (Along with Sara Khan) |
| 2009 | Ghar Ek Sapna | Ansh Verma |
| 2009 | Saat Phere: Saloni Ka Safar | Rajveer |
| 2009-2010 | Raja Ki Aayegi Baraat | Kunwar Angad |
| 2009-2011 | Yeh Rishta Kya Kehlata Hai | Rituraj |
| 2010 | Bandini | Vishal Mehra |
| 2010 | Aahat | Pritam |
| 2010 | Do Hanson Ka Jodaa | Rishi |
| 2010 | Bigg Boss 4 | Guest Contestant |
| 2011 | Looteri Dulhan | Ronit |
| | Adaalat | Advocate Akram Khan (Ep.37 - Ep. 38) |
| 2013 | Hum Ne Li Hai- Shapath | Anuj/Ajay |
| 2013 | Welcome – Baazi Mehmaan Nawazi Ki | Contestant |
| 2013 | Yeh Hai Aashiqui | Rudra |
| 2014 | Fear Files | Vishesh |
| 2016 | Box Cricket League 2 | Contestant |
| 2016 | Sadda Haq 2 | Nirmaan |
| 2018 | Vikram Betaal Ki Rahasya Gatha | Malkhan Singh |
| 2022 | Lock Upp | Contestant |

== Albums ==
He has two albums each year:

- Tabaahi on Speed Records
- Kadak on Ali Merchant (independent channel)

- Best trending DJ by Celeb M awards 2019

Single remixes

- Gulabo (Zee Music)
- Aao Raja (Zee Music)
- Bad Boys Mashup (T-Series).

== Events ==
- March 2020
  - Sunburn Holi shared stage with Vini Vici and Ritviz
- Feb 2020
  - Bollyboom 2020 shared stage with Diljit Dosanjh.
- September 2019 and January 2020
  - Headlined on one night for India's first 3Nights Luxury cruise festival at Jalesh cruises.
- New Year's Eve 2020
  - Performed for 3000 Indian Army officers and their family members.
- Nov 2019 (Coca-Cola Arena - Dubai)
  - Opened the DaBang Concert at Coca-Cola arena for Bollywood Actors like Salman Khan, Katrina Kaif, Daisy Shah, Jacqueline Fernandez, Prabhu Deva, Guru Randhawa and others.
- August and September 2019
  - Ali Merchant Kadak album India Club Tour. (Seven cities)
- June through August 2019
  - Bollywood Arena: Shared stage with Guru Randhawa for five cities
- March 2019
  - Sunburn Holi Shared stage with DJ Snake.
  - Headlined Bollyboom Holi 2019
- September and October 2018 (Indian Tour)
  - Bollyboom Ali Merchant India club tour (five cities)
- May through October 2018 (India tour with other artist)
  - Shared stage with Guru Randhawa for seven cities
- March 2018 :
  - Headlines Bollyboom holi (BKC - Grounds)
