= Ghar Ek Sapnaa =

- Created by: Ananda Telecommunications
- Written by: Gajra Kottary; Paushali Ganguli
- Directed by: Ajai Sinha
- Starring: See below
- Opening theme: "Ghar Ek Sapnaa" by Sapna Mukherji
- Country of origin: India
- Original language: Hindi
- No. of episodes: 657

Production
- Running time: approximately 25 minutes

Original release
- Network: Sahara One
- Release: 15 January 2007 – 11 September 2009

Ghar Ek Sapnaa (transl. Home a dream) is a Hindi television serial that aired on Sahara One channel worldwide. It is based on the story of a young woman, Kakul, whose dreams are shattered when she learns that her husband does not love her and she is not accepted by her in-laws.

== Cast ==
- Sayantani Ghosh / Anisha Kapur as Kakul Samman Chaudhry
- Anisha Kapur as Damini (look-alike of Kakul)
- Ujjwal Rana / Ankur Nayyar as Samman Chaudhary (Kakul's Husband)
- Darshan Dave as Sujeet (Trisha's husband)(Devika's Husband)
- Alok Nath as Amarnath Chaudhary (Samman's father)
- Himani Shivpuri as Uttara (Amarnath's wife)
- Shammi (actress) as Dadi (Amarnath's mother)
- Harsh Chhaya as Dr. Rishabh (Samman's older brother)
- Lata Sabharwal as Cynthia (Rishabh's first wife, killed in a car accident)
- Niki Aneja Walia as Simi Ahuja (lawyer, Dr. Rishabh's friend and second wife)
- Chinky Jaiswal as Sonia Ahuja (Simi Ahuja's Daughter)
- Barkha Madan as Devika (Samman's sister, later Sujeet's wife)
- Vinod Singh as Vicky (Devika's boyfriend, now dead)
- Neha Marda / Vindhya Tiwari as Mritika (Samman's sister, now dead)
- Jeetu Malkani as Ahaan (in love with Mritika)
- Jaya Binju as Tulika (Samman's sister)
- Sachal Tyagi as Abhi (son of Nana, Tulika's boyfriend)
- Nagesh Bhosle as Nana (best friend of Sujeet and Om Shankar)
- Piyush Sahdev / Hasan Zaidi ... Sharad (Samman's younger brother)
- Upsana Shukla as Neha (Sharad's wife)
- Resham Tipnis as Trisha (Kakul's Older Sister, Died in Child Birth)
- Vineet Kumar as Om Shankar (Sujeet and Samman's father-in-law, Trisha and Kakul's father)
- Varun Badola as Gautam (Vanshika's Hushand)
- Kavita Kaushik / Arzoo Govitrikar as Vanshika (Samman's ex-girlfriend)
- Mehul Buch as Dhanraj Saxena (Vanshika and Neha's father, Gautam's father-in-law)
- Mahesh Shetty as Shlok Verma (Step Brother of Sharad and Mrittika, Brother of Ansh)
- Ali Merchant as Ansh Verma (Shlok's younger brother, killed by him)
- Suzanne Bernert special guest appearance
