= Dosti... Yaariyan... Manmarziyan =

- Genre: Coming Of Age; Drama
- Created by: Swastik Productions
- Written by: Anshuman Sinha; Radhika Anand; Jaya Misra; Prakriti Mukherjee
- Directed by: Pushkar Mahabal
- Creative directors: Rishi Rajendra, Nitin Gupta
- Starring: See below
- Country of origin: India
- Original language: Hindi
- No. of seasons: 1
- No. of episodes: 118

Production
- Producers: Siddharth Kumar Tiwari; Gayatri Gil Tewary; Rahul Kumar Tewary
- Production locations: Hrishikesh; Mumbai
- Production company: Swastik Productions

Original release
- Network: StarPlus
- Release: 13 April – 29 August 2015

Dosti... Yariyaan... Manmarziyan is an Indian television drama series which aired from 13 April to 29 August 2015 on StarPlus. The series was produced by Siddharth Kumar Tewary and directed by Pushkar Mahabal for Swastik Productions. It starred Monica Sehgal, Aham Sharma, Shravan Reddy and Kashmira Irani. The series, set in Mumbai, focuses on two young women from contrasting backgrounds who work in an office and want to find the courage to live their own lives.

== Plot ==
Radhika Mishra and Samaira Khanna are best friends. Radhika, an easygoing and optimistic young woman from Rishikesh, wants to be a writer. Her grandfather inspires her to live life to the fullest. Saral Joshi is deeply in love with her, wants to marry her.

Samaira is an independent, bubbly, fun-loving young woman who works at Birdsong Advertising Agency in Mumbai. Neil Malhotra, Sam's friend since childhood, also works at Birdsong and is secretly in love with her. Sam has a poor relationship with her mother, Piyali, who blames her for her son Jay's death.

Radhika befriends Sam and Neil when they go to Rishikesh to shoot an advertisement. Radhika helps Sam by providing her with a tagline for the ad. Seeing her talent, Sam and Neil encourage Radhika to focus on writing. She and Saral get engaged; she moves to Mumbai and begins working at Birdsong.

Sam fights with her mother and leaves Birdsong. She meets Arjun Mehra, who saves her from a dog. However, he is Birdsong's new head of business operations and wants to sabotage Sam.

After overhearing an argument between her parents, Sam leaves home. Radhika's colleagues play a practical joke on her, causing her to get home late; her relatives throw her out. Arjun offers Sam a house; she and Radhika move into it, and Radhika mends Sam's relationship with Piyali.

Sam slowly falls in love with Arjun and proposes to him, which upsets Neil. Radhika becomes suspicious of Arjun and warns Sam, who breaks up with him. Sam and Neil go to Lonavala to look for a shooting location. Arjun, wanting to reconcile with Sam, goes to Lonavla to meet her; Radhika accompanies him, however, and prevents him from doing so.

In Lonavla, while trying to save Arjun, Radhika has an accident. Arjun brings her to the hospital; she realizes that Arjun is a good person, and regrets misunderstanding him.

Arjun and Sam reconcile. Arjun then falls for Radhika, however, because of her selflessness, loyalty and kindness. Mala (Radhika's mother) and Saral go to Mumbai, and Sam and Arjun get engaged.

Nandini, Arjun's adopted sister and a former Birdsong employee, had had an extra-marital affair with Samrat Khanna (Sam's father); however, he returned to his family. Nandini was devastated and suicidal, ten-year-old Arjun saw her mental state, and became bitter. She seeks revenge from Samrat for her misfortune.

Arjun's growing love for Radhika makes him guilty. Realising that Arjun loves Radhika, Nandini manipulates Saral into marrying Radhika without letting Arjun know. Radhika decides to quit her job when Saral blackmails her. However, Arjun advises Radhika not to marry Saral and to focus on her dreams. When she refuses to marry Saral, he tries to marry her forcefully but Arjun stops the wedding. Radhika develops respect for and trust in Arjun, which makes him feel guilty for trying to ruin Sam's life.

Nandini misleads Sam into believing that Radhika is trying to get between her and Arjun. Radhika discovers Arjun's motives and tries to save Sam from Nandini's plan by marrying Arjun. This jeopardises Sam and Radhika's friendship, and Neil consoles the heartbroken Sam.

Nandini asks Arjun to divorce Radhika and court Sam. Arjun tries to manipulate Sam again, but he still loves Radhika and does not want to divorce her. Radhika is determined to save Sam, who tries to get Arjun back and ruin Radhika's life despite Neil's warning.

Radhika learns that Nandini plans to kill Sam without Arjun's knowledge, and realises that Nandini has been using Arjun to seek revenge. After she learns about his innocence, she falls in love with Arjun. Radhika shows Arjun Nandini's true colors, shattering him. He tells Nandini to leave.

Radhika decides to go back to Rishikesh, but Arjun asks her to stay. Since she knows that Sam loves him, however, she leaves.

Neil and Sam then realise that they love each other, and marry. Neil, Sam and Arjun go to Rishikesh to bring Radhika back. Arjun apologizes, and proposes to her romantically.

Two years pass. Arjun and Radhika are happily married, and Radhika receives an award as best copywriter of the year. Radhika, Samaira, Neil and Arjun continue to work together at Birdsong.

== Cast ==
- Monica Sehgal as Radhika Mehra (nee: Mishra): Dilip and Mala's daughter; Ridheema and Ankush's younger sister; Suraj's grand-daughter; Sam's best-friend; Arjun's wife.
- Kashmira Irani as Samaira "Sam" Malhotra (nee: Khanna) : Samrat's daughter; Jay and Manya's sister; Radhika's best-friend; Arjun's ex-fiancee; Neil's childhood friend turned wife.
- Aham Sharma as Arjun Mehra: head of the Birdsong advertising agency; Sam's ex-fiance; Radhika's husband.
- Shravan Reddy as Neil Malhotra: Arjun's friend; Sam's childhood friend turned husband
- Rohan Tewary as ten-year-old Arjun
- Pooja Kapoor as eight-year-old Sam
- Karan Khanna as Saral Joshi; Ridheema's husband.
- Jason Tham as Teji, Radhika's colleague
- Dev Kapoor as Zubin, Radhika's colleague
- Shaiza Kashyap as Kritika, Radhika's colleague
- Shreya Sharma as Susan
- Amit Dhawan as Sapan
- Shilpa Saklani as Nandini
- Mohan Kapoor as Samrat Khanna, Sam, Manya and Jay's father and founder of Birdsong
- Gagan Singh as Jay Khanna, Sam's elder brother, who dies at a young age
- Orvana Ghai as Manya Khanna, Sam's younger sister
- Vidyadhar Karmarkar as Suraj Mishra, Radhika's grandfather
- Sadanand Patil as Dilip Mishra, Radhika, Riddhima and Ankush's father
- Ushma Rathod as Mala Dilip Mishra, Radhika, Riddhima and Ankush's mother
- Ridheema Tiwari as Ridheema Joshi (nee: Mishra), Radhika and Ankush's elder sister, who is married to Saral's elder brother
- Aashish Mahrotra as Ankush Mishra, Radhika's elder brother and Saral's friend
- Pooja Sharma (cameo appearance)

== Production ==
Dosti... Yaariyan... Manmarziyan's opening scenes were filmed in Rishikesh; other scenes were filmed in Mumbai. Due to low ratings, the series was cancelled within four months of its premiere.

== Reception ==
=== Critical reception ===
According to a Times of India review, "Manmarziyan have created characters which are real and relatable to the youth today." The Indian Express gave the series two-and-a-half stars: "What struck us was the freshness of the show. Monica Sehgal leaves quite an impression, whereas veteran Kashmira Irani who makes a comeback on television after seven years still knows how to make an impact on-screen. The show also scores some brownie points by exploiting the unmatched beauty of real locations."

=== Award nominations ===
| Year | Award | Category | Person | Result |
|---|---|---|---|---|
| 2015 | Indian Telly Awards | Best Cinematographer | Sayak Bhattacharya | Nominated |
| 2015 | Indian Telly Awards | Best Director | Pushkar Mahabal | Nominated |
| 2015 | Indian Telly Awards | Best Editor | Satya Sharma | Nominated |
