= Monica Sehgal =

Indian television actress

- Born: 6 March 1990 (age 36); Ujjain, Madhya Pradesh, India
- Occupation: Actress
- Years active: 2015-2017

Monica Sehgal (born 6 March 1990) is an Indian television actress known for her role as Radhika Mishra in Dosti... Yaariyan... Manmarziyan which aired on Star Plus.

== Early life and education ==
Monica was born on 6 March 1990, Ujjain. She completed her graduation and post-graduation from Xavier College, Mumbai.

== Career ==
In 2015, she made her television debut with show Dosti... Yaariyan... Manmarziyan' opposite Aham Sharma.

After that in 2016 she was seen as Bahamani in Chakravartin Ashoka Samrat.

In 2016, she was seen as Kavya in Bindass's Yeh Hai Aashiqui.

In 2018, She hosted the 7th Season of Zee TV reality show 'Foodshala' which was specifically designed for Middle-East audiences. And also seen anchoring India’s first-ever live trivia game show, Loco, from the house of Pocket Aces.

== Television ==
Year	Title	Role	Notes
2015	Dosti... Yaariyan... Manmarziyan	Radhika Mishra / Radhika Arjun Mehra	Protagonist
2015 - 2016	Chakravartin Ashoka Samrat	Bahamani	Recurring role
2016	Yeh Hai Aashiqui	Kavya	(Season 4 - Episode 18)
2017	"The Adventure of Monica, Tony, Seb, and Yahvi"	Monica	Herself
