= Vinod Singh (actor) =

Indian TV actor and model

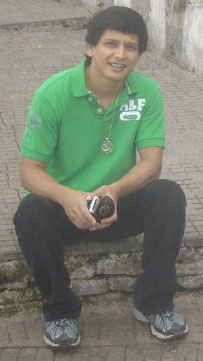
Vinod Singh

Vinod Kumar Singh is an Indian television actor and model. He played the title role in the show Ayushmaan.

== Personal life ==
Vinod Singh was born to Malati Devi and Shrinath Singh. He was born in Visakhapatnam, but was brought up in Mumbai. He and his twin sister are the youngest of 5 siblings. He did his schooling from Saint Francis D'Assisi High School, Borivali West. He went to Mithibai College for higher education. Later, he attended Terna Engineering College, Nerul, where he did Electronics and Telecommunication Engineering.

== Career ==
Vinod started his acting career with Ad Films. He has done around 424 ads, of which some were for huge brands like Close Up, Coca-Cola, Frooti, Onida, Nerolac Paints, Hero Honda, Sony Cyber-shot etc. He has also appeared in a few music videos. Babul Supriyo's music video Sochta hoon uska dil gave him overnight recognition.

Vinod made his television debut with Sab TV's comedy show Daddy Samjha Karo. This was followed by shows including Hip Hip Hurray, Dil se Dosti, Gharwali Uparwali, and Bahuraaniyan. His breakthrough role was as the lead in Ayushmaan which made him a household name. He has played prominent roles in Ye Meri Life Hai, Amber Dhara, Ghar Ek Sapna and several other shows. He has also acted in Bollywood movies Stumped, Hum Tum and Daughter.

He has also done a musical play Black Market.

== Television ==
- Ayushmaan
- Ye Meri Life Hai
- Amber Dhara
- Arjun
- Ghar Ek Sapna
- Princess Dollie Aur Uska Magic Bag
- Dil Se Dosti
- Hip Hip Hurray
- Daddy Samjha Karo
- Bahuraaniyan
- Gharwali Uparwali
- Koi Jaane Kya Hoga
- Mahima Shanidev Ki
- Gubbare
- Rishtey
- Kagaar
- Yes or No
- CID
- F.I.R.
- Aye Dil-E-Nadaan
- Sssshhh...Phir Koi Hai
- Man Mein Hai Visshwas
- Supercops vs Supervillains

== Filmography ==
- Stumped
- Hum Tum
- Creature 3D

Daughter

== Other shows ==
- Fear Factor
- Celebrity Fame Gurukul
- Boogie Woogie
- Kisme Kitna Hai Dum
