= Prafulla Dahanukar =

Indian painter (1934–2014)

Prafulla Dilip Dahanukar
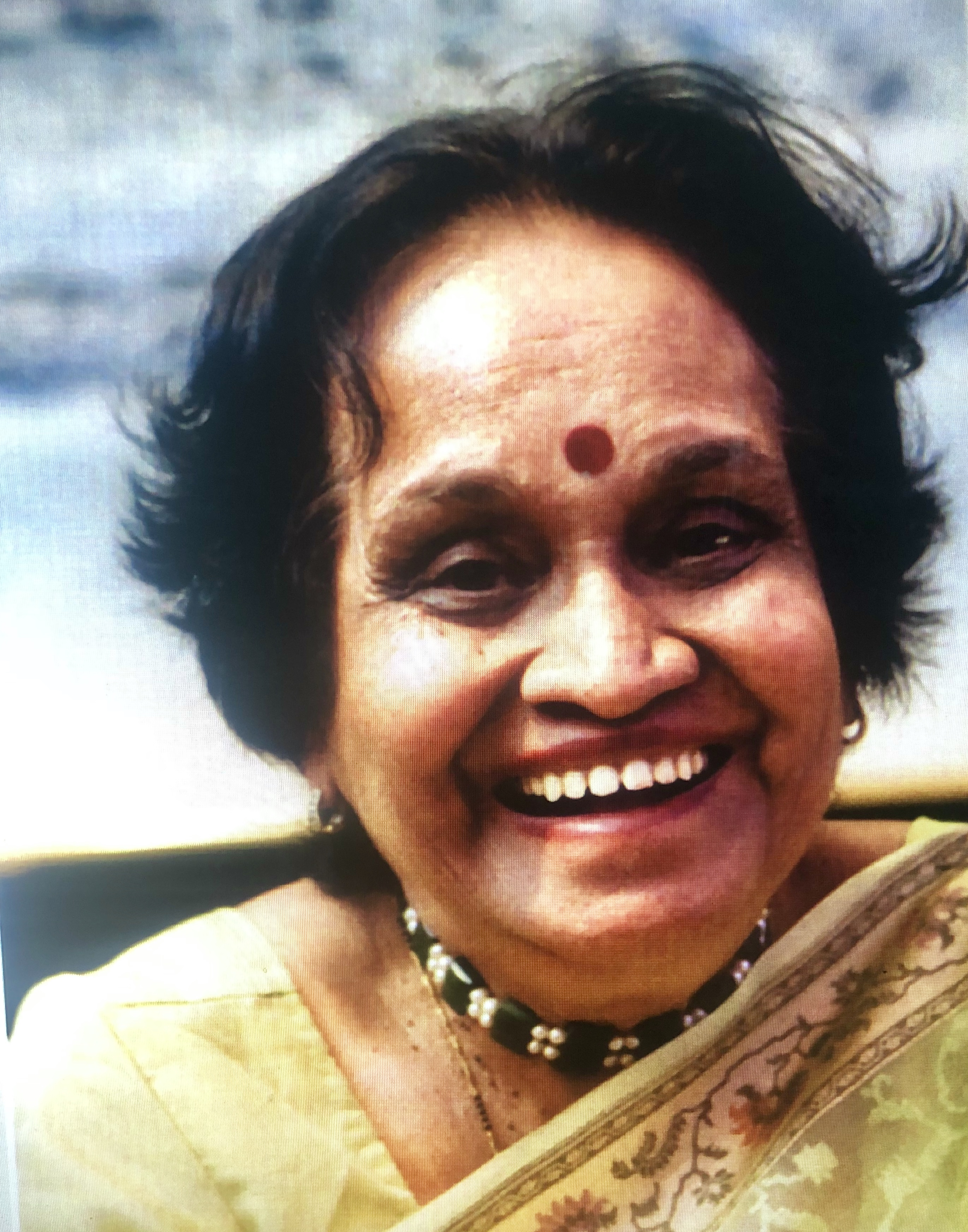
- Dahanukar, the Artist
- Born: Prafulla Subrai Joshi; 1 January 1934; Goa, Portuguese India
- Died: 1 March 2014 (aged 80); Mumbai, India
- Education: Sir J. J. School of Art
- Known for: Visual arts, Painting, drawing
- Movement: Progressive Arts Movement
- Spouse: Dilip Dahanukar
- Children: Gauri Mehta, Gopika Dahanukar
- Awards: Sir J. J. School of Arts Gold Medalist 1955, The Bombay Art Society Silver Medal in 1955

Prafulla Dahanukar (nee’ Joshi) (1934 – 2014) was an Indian painter, a leader in modern Indian art who also helped and influenced many young artists in India.

== Biography ==
Prafulla Dahanukar was born Prafulla Joshi in Bandora, Goa to Subrai Anant Joshi and singer Kesarbai Bandodkar, and she grew up in Mumbai. She studied Fine Art at the Sir J.J. School of Art in Mumbai and graduated with a Gold Medal in 1955. The Institute was filled with luminaries who transformed the art and culture scene in India. The Government of France awarded her a scholarship to study fine art in Paris in 1961.

Dahanukar served the cause of art and painting for all her life. She was a committee member of the Lalit Kala Akademi in New Delhi from 1974 to 1979, and the President of Bombay Art Society for 11 years from 1993 to 1998 and from 2010 till her death in 2014. She was a trustee of the Jehangir Art Gallery (for over 40 years) and committee member of Kala Academy in Goa (for over 30 years). She was also the President of the Art Society of India and the Chairperson of The Artists' Centre, Mumbai. She was also the Founder president of India Art Festival, an only art fair then in Mumbai started in 2010-11.

Prafulla Dahanukar was one of the founder members of Sangit Kala Kendra with Aditya Birla, its President for 3 years and continued to work on its committee for over 30 years. She was the committee member of the Music Forum. She was on the Board of Trustees of the Indian National Theatre for the last 4 years. Besides the work for the artists, she was involved as the main trustee for last 30 years of an orphanage called Bal Anandgram in Lonavala. She had two daughters (Gauri Mehta and Gopika Dahanukar) and five grandchildren (Ritam Mehta, Kamakshi Kaarthikeyan, Anam Mehta, Shantala Mehta and Keshava Kaarthikeyan).

== Work ==
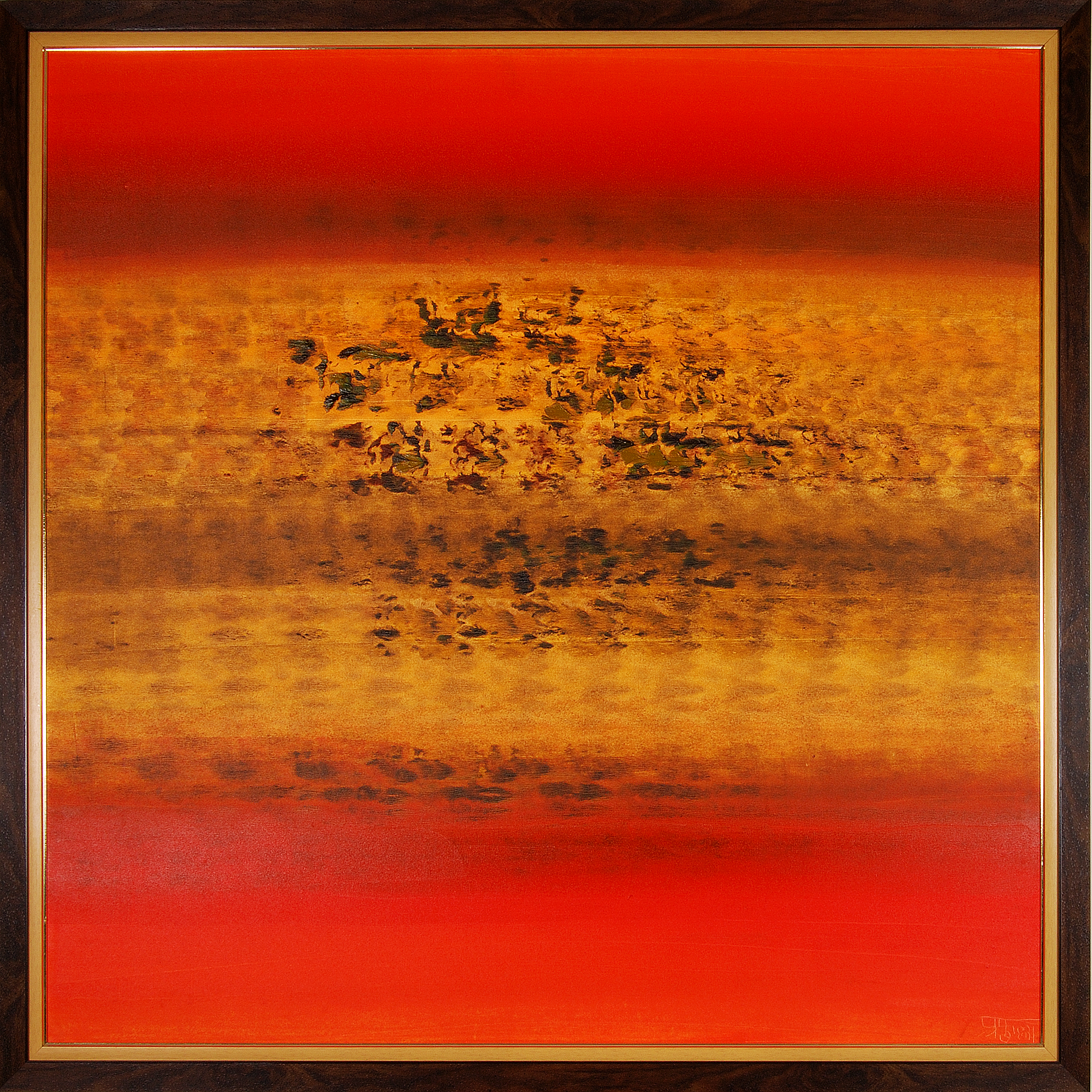
"Eternal Space"

Prafulla Dahanukar painted abstract landscapes in generally one vivid and dominant color, with myriad shades and subtlety. She called her paintings "Eternal Space" as she believed that space is unending and couldn't be destroyed.

== Exhibitions and museum collections ==
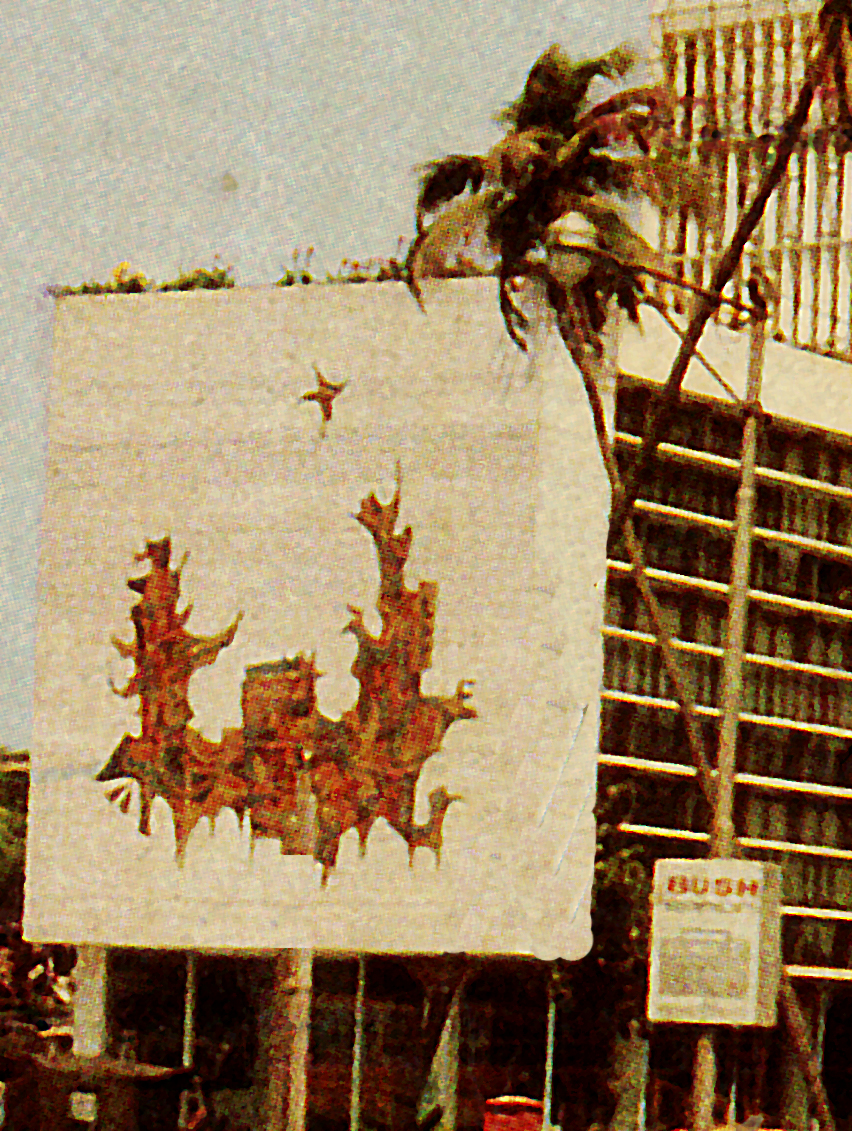
Prafulla's Mural on Marble Facade

She had solo exhibitions regularly from 1956. While in Paris she held an exhibition of her paintings in 1961 and has since then participated in many international exhibitions in England, Hungary, Switzerland, Germany, Australia, Japan, Portugal, Iceland and France. She has exhibited solo 3 times in London, the first of which was sponsored by the High Commission of India in 1978. Citibank sponsored her show in 2006 in Ardean Gallery in Cork Street, London. In India she has had several individual shows in Mumbai, Delhi, Calcutta, and Chennai. Barclays Bank recently in November 2008 sponsored her exhibition in Dubai which was opened by the famous painter M.F. Husain. On completion of fifty years of her career as a painter, she was honored by the Jehangir Art Gallery which sponsored a Retrospective show of her career paintings. Prafulla's paintings have been offered on Sotheby's and Osean art auctions.

Prafulla used her artistic talent in creating murals in ceramic, wood and glass. These murals adorn prominent buildings in Mumbai, Pilani, Kolkata and Muscat (Oman).

Her paintings are in the collections of the National Gallery of Modern Art and Lalit Kala Academy in New Delhi, the Central Museum in Nagpur, the Prince of Wales Museum in Mumbai, and many institutional and private collections in India and overseas.

== Prafulla Dahanukar Art Foundation ==
The Prafulla Dahanukar Art Foundation (PDAF) was started by Dilip Dahanukar, in memory of his wife Prafulla Dahanukar. The PDAF is a unique art foundation, sponsored initially by the leading artists of India sending in a painting each, in memory of Prafulla, with the funds from sale of these paintings launching this non-profit organization, formed by artists, for artists.

PDAF awards fellowships to emerging artists in India. The foundation provides resources for artists, offering visibility and patronage to younger artists while enabling senior artists to offer guidance.

In 2014, the PDAF launched a new initiative, the Emerging Artist Reward Scheme, which is a contest for artists registered with the PDAF. Through this, the PDAF will give out Gold, Silver, and Bronze awards to artists at the state level and at the all-India level, across six different categories of art i.e.; Painting, Sculpture, Ceramics, Printmaking, Installation and Photography. The overall winners of the contest will win a sponsored solo show at a leading art gallery in Mumbai.

== Awards ==
- 1955: Silver Medal for her painting in the Annual Exhibition of the Bombay Art Society.
