= Amber Dhara =

- Also known as: Amber Dhara - Kahani Judi Behno Ki
- Written by: Jay Verma
- Directed by: Bhushan Patel; Loknath Pandey
- Starring: See below
- Voices of: Sonu Nigam; Udit Narayan
- Opening theme: "Amber Dhara"
- Country of origin: India
- No. of episodes: 124

Production
- Producers: Sidharth Tewary; Vikas Seth
- Running time: approx. 28 minutes
- Production company: Swastik Pictures

Original release
- Network: Sony Entertainment Television
- Release: 24 September 2007 – 24 April 2008

Amber Dhara is an Indian Hindi language television series that aired on Sony Entertainment Television from 24 September 2007 until 24 April 2008, based on the lives of conjoined twins, Amber and Dhara.

== Plot ==
The story revolves around the life of conjoined twins Amber(Kashmira Irani) and Dhara(Sulagna Panigrahi), who share their liver and are conjoined at the hip. 20% of the liver is part of Amber's body and the remaining 80% is part of Dhara's body which rules out the possibility of a surgery being carried out to separate the twins without any fatality being involved in the process. The surgeon, a quack doctor who the twins' mother, Lata, consulted asserted that if the surgery is carried out, Amber will die thereby scaring her off to get any other doctor's opinion.

The girls face many obstacles and decide to run away to Mumbai to pursue Amber's dream to become a singer. Anuj, who is responsible for luring them to Mumbai, is revealed to have had bad intentions and wants the girls to join the circus. Amber and Dhara are dressed up in clownish outfits and are told that they are going to perform but instead are tricked into coming to the circus where they are made fun of. Both girls try to escape the humiliation but Anuj and his goons catch them and force the girls to stay. Amber and Dhara decide to perform one show and end up making many friends at the circus. After giving a marvelous performance, the two girls escape from the Circus. Luckily, their friend Akshat finds them and they live with him until they are able to pursue Amber's dream. Akshat's mother Kamini Mehra does not like her son getting involved with Amber. She along with Soniya tries to separate both of them. They try to blame them for a theft that Kamini and Sonia orchestrates. However they are proved innocent. Kamini then tries to get them killed by hiring a killer. But he misses 3 times. In the end Kamini lures them in a secluded temple in the forest. She points a gun at the girls. But Amber also points a gun as she has borrowed it from Kunal (their band leader), who is ex-army. Somehow, Kamini gets shot and the girls end up getting arrested for her murder. Their mother comes to support them and fights the case for them but finds out that their estranged father is fighting for the other side. Lata is fighting cancer in secret, only her father and doctor knows. Their father, Mr. Shukla tries his best to keep the girls imprisoned. Lata tries to reason with court that Dhara is innocent and that is why they should not imprison Dhara for Amber's crime. Their doctor is called and he informs court that the girls cannot be separated. So the judge calls for Jury and gives bail to the girls. Akshat comes to his senses and helps Kunal and Inspector to look for TK, as he was the only other person in forest. Jury calls for retrial, as Amber has been stating from the start that she didn't pull the trigger. Jury gives judgement that Amber has done the murder. Jury wants a panel of international doctors to look into Amber Dhara's case so that Dhara does not get injustice. Dhara does not want to get removed from Amber as she does not want Amber to go to jail. Meanwhile, the search for TK is on. Lata meets Dev Shukla's new wife, who was their ex-college mate. And gets to know they have a son, Pawan. Lata needs treatment fast but she needs to fight case too. Amber grows silent. She thinks its difficult to save herself. She picks up fight with Dhara. And shouts at Dhara and her mother that she wants to separate from Dhara stating that why can't she have anything that is her own. Lata understands that Amber is doing this so that Dhara says yes to the operation. Amber keeps throwing keeps fighting until Dhara agrees for operation. She finally begs Lata that she doesn't want to be guilty of ruining her sister's life. Dhara finally gives her yes. They tell their yes to court tearfully. Amber is happy that Dhara will get to live her life fully even if she herself dies (as her chances for survival are only 40%) or even if she survives and go to jail for 14 years. Amber expresses how her dream of becoming a singer is left incomplete . So Kunal keeps a concert to fulfill the dream before the operation. The court gives permission for the concert. During publicity for the show, they encounter Dev. Dev wife tries hinting at Dev and the girls relation. But they go away. Lata hides her condition. Simone invites them to her house to help them get sponsors but gets them insulted instead. So that Simone does not reveal their father's name, Lata asks forgiveness for insulting the shallowness of Simone's friends. Sonia gets murdered. The girls get to know about their father, they confront Lata who finally tells them that their father abandoned them. Inspector catches Simone, who admits that she killed Kamini. She reveals that she did this because Kamini did a fake sting operation on her son Pawan, which led him to depression. It is revealed that Shukla knew about this.

In the end, they are surgically separated from each other without any fatalities and go on to live their own lives.

== Cast ==
- Kashmira Irani as Amber Dixit (Dhara's twin sister)
- Sulagna Panigrahi as Dhara Dixit(Amber's twin sister)
- Mona Ambegaonkar as Lata Dixit (formerly- Lata Dev Shukla; Amber and Dhara's Mother)
- Sudesh Berry as Dev Shukla, (Ex Husband of Lata Dixit),(Amber and Dhara's father)
- Paintal as Mahendra Pratap Dixit (Lata Dixit's Father)
- Harshad Chopda/Ali Merchant as Akshat Mehra (Amber/Dhara's close friend, also love-interest of Amber)
- Nasir Khan as Anuj (Kidnapper of Amber and Dhara)
- Shweta Gulati as Sonya Jaiswal (Akshat Mehra childhood friend who is jealous of amber dhara)
- Himani Shivpuri as Biji (Akshat's Grandmother)
- Jaya Bhattacharya as Kamini Mehra (Akshat's Mother)
- Kamya Panjabi as Deepikaa (antagonist)
- Naresh Suri as Mr. Mehra (Akshat's Father)
- Vinod Singh as TK (Amber/Dhara's colleague in the band)
- Rahul Raj Singh as Kunal (Head of the 'band' group, also love-interest of Dhara)
- Madhura Naik as Deema (Member of the band)
- Aman Verma as Shanu
- Pankaj Berry as Doctor Mathur, Lata's Friend
- Simone Shukla, Dev Shukla's wife

=== Cameo appearance ===
- Prashant Tamang did cameo in Amber dhara which was a musical singing based show (Episode 31 )
- Gauri singh harmeet kaur appeared as cameo appearance for the starting promo scene
