= Shaiza Kashyap =

Indian writer

- Born: Shaiza Kashyap; Saharanpur
- Occupation(s): Model, actress
- Years active: 2013–present

'Shaiza' Kashyap is an Indian actress. She also appeared in Anurag Kashyap Yudh. She recently got listed by the prestigious Forbes magazine under "Forbes India celebrity 100 nominee list 2015", She is the first person under 25 who made it to the list. She works in milan talkies a film by Tigmanshu Dhulia as kusum 2019.

== Early life ==
She was born in Pilakhani, a small district in Sahranpur. She was a professional theatre artist with Bharti Dharma Kshitij Tepertory. Later she joined Kingdom of Dreams as part of Jhumroo. She was a winner of Miss West Delhi 2012.

== Television ==
- PS I Hate You (2014) as Lara
- Ghunghat (2014) as lead
- Dosti... Yaariyan... Manmarziyan (2015) as Kritika
