= Jiyo Utho Badho Jeeto =

Song by A. R. Rahman
- Language: Hindi
- Released: 28 August 2010
- Recorded: 2010; Panchathan Record Inn and AM Studios, Chennai
- Genre: World music
- Length: 4:16; 2:08 (Short)
- Songwriters: A. R. Rahman (music), Mehboob (lyrics)
- Producer: A. R. Rahman

Music video
- "Jiyo Utho Badho Jeeto" on YouTube

"Jiyo Utho Badho Jeeto" (transl. Live, Rise, Ascend, Win; also known as "Oh Yaron Ye India Bula Liya") is a song by Indian musician A. R. Rahman. It was the official anthem for the 2010 Commonwealth Games, which was held in Delhi, India between 3 October and 14 October 2010. The highly anticipated song was released on 28 August for digital download, receiving notably mixed responses from the Organising Committee, critics and listeners alike. The music video of the song was released on 23 September, which featured only a shorter version of the song. The new version became the official anthem, since it received very positive responses. The title of the song is based on the motto of the games, "Come out and play".

"Jiyo Utho Badho Jeeto" was first performed by Rahman at the song release function held at Kingdom of Dreams in Gurugram, Haryana on 28 August 2010. The song was dedicated to Mahatma Gandhi.

== Background ==
A. R. Rahman was chosen to compose the theme song way back in 2009. The Commonwealth Games Organising Committee officially signed on Rahman to compose the song in April 2010. Rahman asked ₹ 15 crores as remuneration, a very large sum. The Group of Ministers approved the song on 15 August 2010. Rahman would also be associated with the promotional events of the sporting event. About the selection of the song as the official anthem, Rahman said, "It’s definitely an honour composing this theme song. I hope people like it and it becomes the spirit of the whole Commonwealth Games."

== Composition ==
Jiyo Utho Badho Jeeto
A 41 second sample of Jiyo Utho Badho Jeeto

The song was composed and performed by A. R. Rahman. It is the second time Rahman has composed for a sports event, the previous one was in 2008 for Champions League Twenty20. The lyrics for the song, in Hindi with partly English words, were penned by Mehboob, who also penned Rahman's "Maa Tujhe Salaam". It took nearly six months for Rahman to complete the song. Rahman, who started the work in April, was still modifying the song on the day before the song release. Additional arrangements of the song was done by Ranjit Barot, while the chant "Jiyo Utho Badho Jeeto" was by Mehboob Alam.

== Release ==
The song release was preceded by a promotional event held at Delhi. Rahman unveiled the title of the song and sang the initial lines, Oh Yaron Ye India Bula Liya. On being asked if it was in the style of "Waka Waka (This Time for Africa)" (the theme song for 2010 FIFA World Cup) Rahman answered that he was not trying to replicate Waka Waka (This Time for Africa) and that he wanted to go beyond what already exists. Rahman also stated that the song would be out within ten days. At this event, Rahman dedicated the song to Mahatma Gandhi.

The song was officially released on 28 August 2010. Organising Committee Chairman Suresh Kalmadi unveiled the song in the inaugural Swagatham ceremony held at Kingdom of Dreams Gurgaon, Haryana. The release function was also preceded by speeches by Delhi Chief Minister Sheila Dikshit and her Haryana counterpart Bhupinder Singh Hooda. Rahman performed the song live at this event, which lasted for five minutes.

== Reception ==
Rahman performing "Jiyo Utho Badho Jeeto" at its audio release

The original version of the song received notably mixed responses, with many listeners and critics claiming to be disappointed, having expected better results from Rahman. Rahman was openly and downright criticized by the Organising Committee's member, including board executive member Vijay Kumar Malhotra and former sports minister Shahnawaz Hussain, who quoted that the song was nowhere near "Waka Waka", comparing it to Shakira's 2010 FIFA World Cup anthem, and that "no one in the Organising Committee likes it except perhaps Suresh Kalmadi", whilst noted musicians from the industry also expressed their disappointment. Reports also suggested that the committee had asked Rahman to recompose the song. Later in an interview with NDTV, Rahman apologized for the disappointment caused by his anthem, admitting that the track was "not up to the mark". He furthermore added, "I am sorry to have let anybody down; but I'm definitely proud of the composition". In a statement published in Facebook, Rahman thanked all those who gave him extremely positive and encouraging responses when the original song released.

It still managed to set a new record within two hours of its release, mainly due to the high anticipation by fans. In that time-frame it became one of the most searched for songs on the Internet with more than 7,000 downloads.

Following the criticism, a shorter and tweaked version of the song was released along with the video on 23 September. The shorter version, however, was met with positive responses and was cited to be peppier and more apt as a sporting anthem, hence replacing the original version as the official anthem. The music video, directed by Bharat Bala featured Rahman himself.

== Music video ==
A 2.08 minutes long music video was released on 23 September, and was directed and produced by Bharat Bala. Feroz Khan was the choreographer, Varun Bahl the designer and Vijayta Kumar the stylist. The music video featured A. R. Rahman, Milkha Singh, Saina Nehwal and Samresh Jung.

== Live performances ==
A. R. Rahman performed the track for the first time at the release function of the song on 28 August 2010 at the Kingdom of Dreams amphitheatre in Gurgaon, Haryana. Rahman took 5 minutes to sing the song, which was live telecasted on NDTV and several websites. The performance was preceded by colourful dances, including for the song Jai ho by Rahman. Rahman's rendering was accompanied by dance performances by Hussain Kuwajerwala, Gauhar Khan and Kashmira Irani, on the theme of Zangoora - The Gypsy Prince. Choreographed by renowned dance director Shiamak Dawar, the performance started with Hussain descending from the top of the stage clasped in an eagle's clutches. Rahman also performed the song live in the opening ceremony of the XIX commonwealth games 2010 New Delhi on 3 October.
