= Keshava (musician) =

Indian tabla player (born 2003)

Keshava Kaarthikeyan
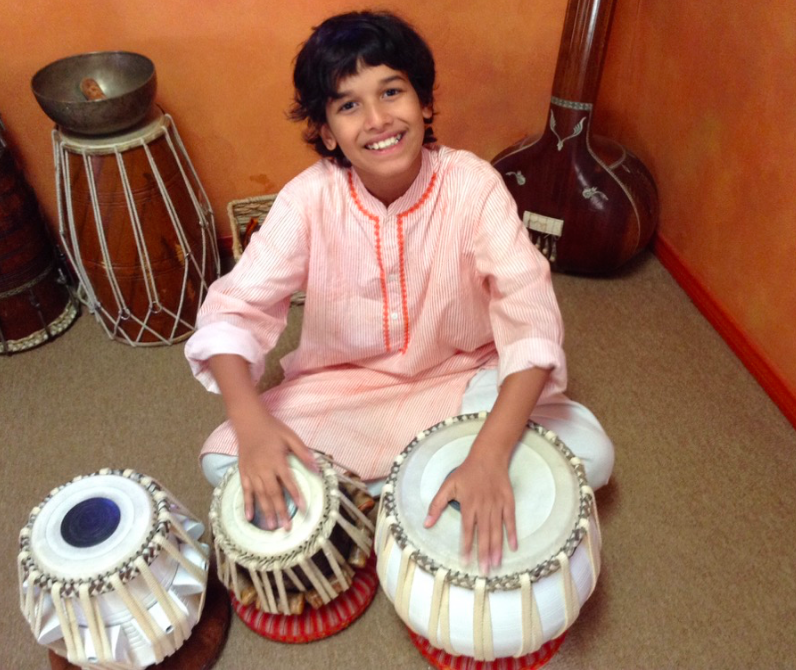

Background information
- Born: 1 March 2003 (age 23); Chennai, Tamil Nadu
- Origin: India
- Genre: Hindustani classical music
- Occupation: Tabla Prodigy
- Instrument: tabla
- Years active: 2010–present

Keshava Kaarthikeyan (born 1 March 2003) is an Indian tabla player. He is a prodigy and performed at the age of seven at the Delhi Commonwealth Games.

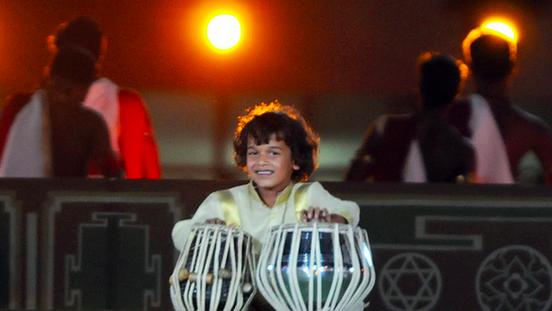
Keshava performing at Commonwealth Games Opening Ceremony 2010

== Early life ==
Keshava Kaarthikeyan was born in Chennai, India and grew up in a musical family in Pondicherry, Auroville, India He is the grandson of noted artist and arts patron, Prafulla Dahanukar. He started learning tabla when he was two years old.

== Career ==
Keshava was spotted by Bharat Bala at an event, while he was conceiving Rhythms of India, the first Part of the Delhi Commonwealth Games opening ceremony in 2010. Since then he has performed extensively with his mother Gopika Dahanukar and raga-guitarist Nadaka and learnt from Amit Kavtekar a student of Ustad Allarakha. Keshava was also enrolled in the Pandit Shankar Ghosh Academy online and has also taken classes with Pt. Arup Chattopadhay and masterclasses with Ustad Zakir Hussain. Currently he is under the guidance of Pt. Yogesh Samsi from the Punjab Gharana and a long time student of Ustad Allarakha and his senior student Shekhar Gandhi.

Keshava has performed extensively in India, Europe, USA and Canada. Some of the noted bands and musicians he has played with are Portico UK in jazz improvisation for Action against Hunger, Marc Longis bass guitarist, Mahesh Vinayakaram vocalist, Pt Raja Kale vocalist.
