= Kingdom of Dreams =

Entertainment venue in Gurgaon, India

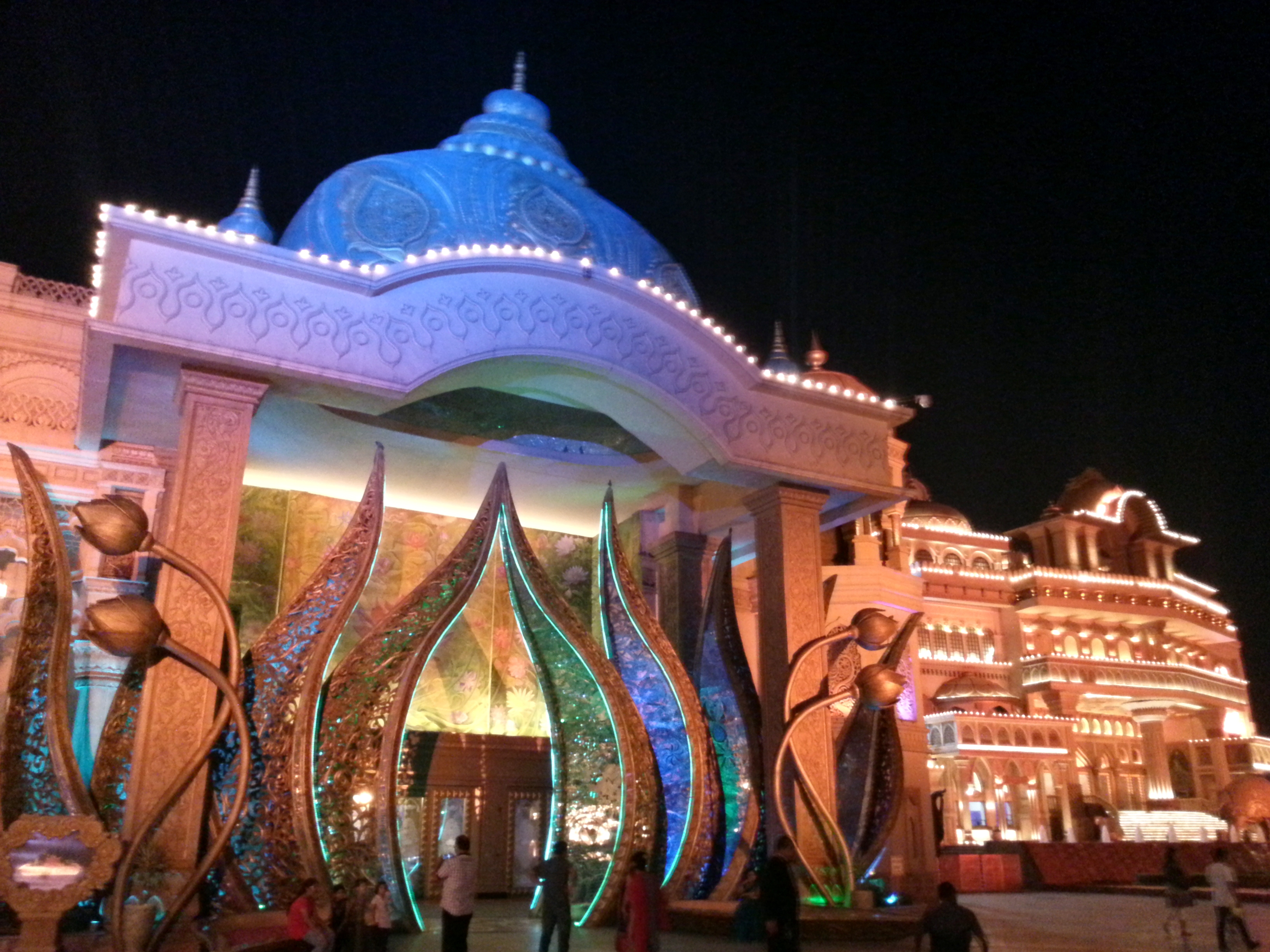
- Culture Gully and Nautanki Mahal auditorium, Kingdom of Dreams, Gurgaon
- Interactive map of Kingdom of Dreams
- Address: Sector 29, Gurgaon, Haryana, India
- Coordinates: 28°28′5″N 77°4′9″E
- Owner: The Great Indian Nautanki Company
- Current use: Entertainment complex

Construction
- Opened: 18 September 2010
- Years active: 2010-2021

Website
- www.kingdomofdreams.in

Kingdom of Dreams was an entertainment complex located in the Indian city of Gurgaon. Owned by the Great Indian Nautanki Company (GINC), a joint venture between Apra Group and Wizcraft, and opened in 2010, the 6-acre (24,000 m^{2}) facility consisted of two auditoriums, the 864-seat Nautanki Mahal, the 350-seat Showshaa Theatre, and an indoor cultural "boulevard" featuring dining, crafts, and entertainment.

The complex was closed in July 2022 by the Haryana Shahari Vikas Pradhikaran (HVSP), in a dispute over unpaid lease payments for the complex's property.

== History ==
The complex was inaugurated on 29 January 2010, by Chief Minister of Haryana Bhupinder Singh Hooda, with appearances by Javed Akhtar, Ehsaan Noorani, and Loy Mendonsa. It is a project of The Great Indian Nautanki Company, a joint venture between events firm Wizcraft International Entertainment and real estate developer Apra Group. The companies described Kingdom of Dreams as being a complex "where ethnic Indian culture meets modern entertainment", and compared it to New York City's Broadway.

The Culture Gully portion of the complex opened on 30 July 2010. On 28 August 2010, the official song of the 2010 Commonwealth Games, "Jiyo Utho Bado Jeeto", was presented during a promotional event at the complex. Kingdom of Dreams officially opened to the public on 18 September 2010. On 19 September 2010, actor Shah Rukh Khan was announced at the complex's "global ambassador".

After its successful opening, GINC disclosed plans to potentially open a second, larger Kingdom of Dreams complex in Mumbai, and similar complexes internationally in China, Dubai, Singapore, South Africa, as well as the United States (with a particular focus on Las Vegas and a potential partnership with real estate developer Steve Wynn).

In the mid-2010s, the complex began to face financial difficulties. In 2014, Haryana Shahari Vikas Pradhikaran (HSVP, formerly Haryana Urban Development Authority) opened an investigation into Kingdom of Dreams' finances after a ₹39.2 million cheque for a lease payment bounced. GINC and HSVP engaged in a legal dispute over the non-payment. In 2016, actor Gaurav Gera—who played in its show Jhumroo—accused its owners of not having paid him dues for at least two and a half years, and launched a social media campaign to call out the show's producer Gagan Sharma. By then, its owners had owed ₹420 million in unpaid lease payments. In October 2018, HSVP appointed Grant Thorton as a consultant to seek a new operator for the facility.

The complex was further impacted by the COVID-19 pandemic. In July 2022, HSVP terminated GINC's lease, and subsequently locked the property. Later that month, GINC obtained a stay on the termination.

On 26 July 2023, a fire broke out in the facility's basement; there were no injuries. On 15 March 2025, a fire broke out due to negligence.

== Facilities ==
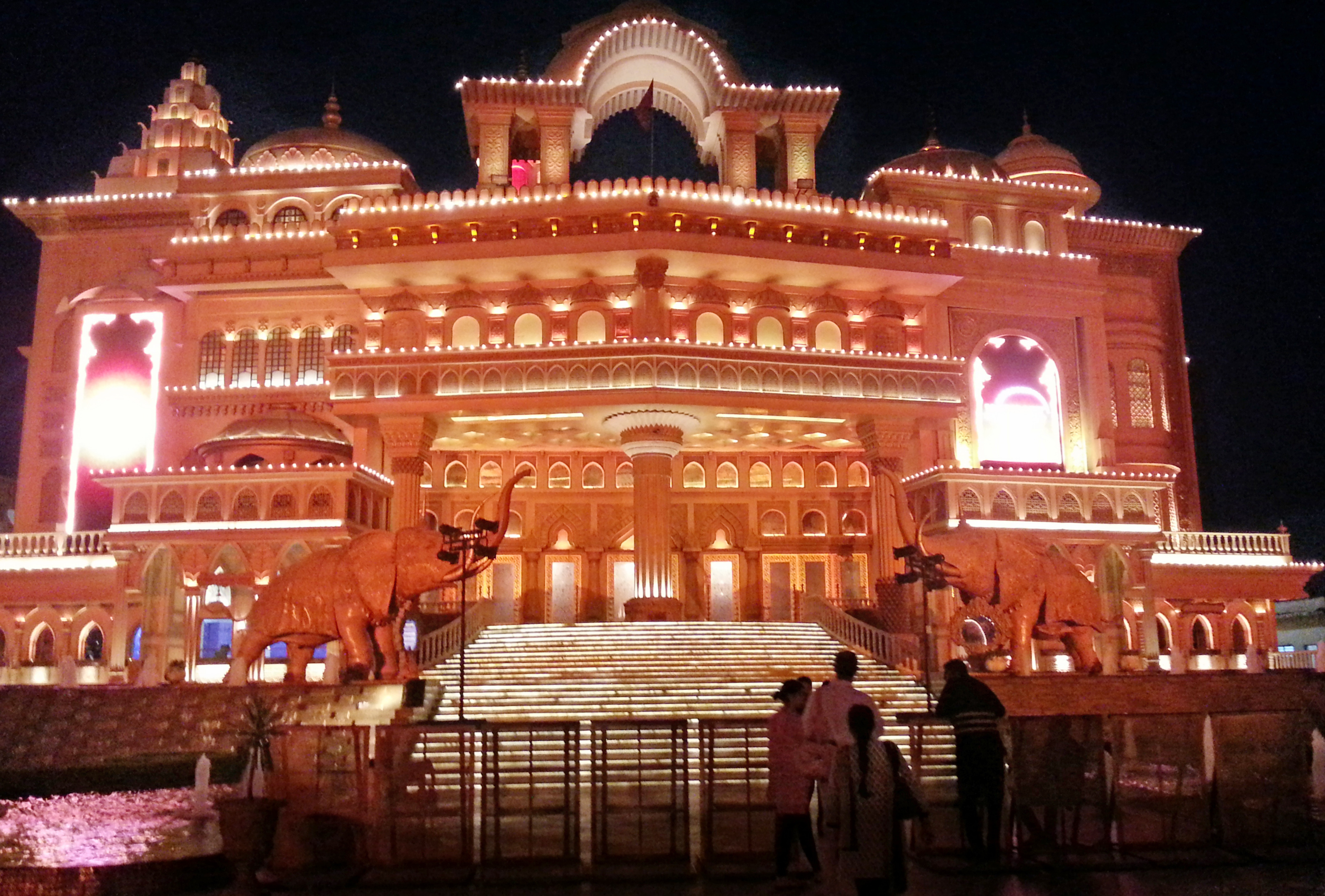
Kingdom of Dreams auditorium, Nautanki Mahal, where the musical Zangoora was inaugurated in 2010

Nautanki Mahal is Kingdom of Dreams' main theatre hall; the 864-seat, palace-themed auditorium opened with its first original production, the "Bollywood musical" Zangoora. In April 2012, the theatre opened a second production, Jhumroo, based on the life of Kishore Kumar.

The Showshaa Theatre is a 350-seat domed amphitheater on the complex; its programming included productions of traditional folk performances such as Ramlila, as well as The Great Indian Talent Circus and the wedding-themed musical The Big Fat Indian Wedding Show.

Culture Gully is a 48,500 sq ft (4,510 m^{2}) indoor "boulevard" designed to showcase Indian culture, including artwork reflecting each state of India, restaurants featuring chefs from across the country, artisan and craft stores, a dry massage parlor, and street performers. Its entryway features a sculpture of 20 ft (6.1 metres)-tall lotus petals, adorned with mirrors. A Bollywood-themed bar and restaurant known as the IIFA Buzz Lounge is also featured in the area, which included memorabilia related to Bollywood films (including posters, props and costumes, and an IIFA trophy).
