= Junglee Pictures =

Indian film production and distribution company established in 2014

- Type: Public
- Industry: Entertainment
- Predecessor: Times Infotainment Media (2005-2007); Mirchi Movies (2007-2014)
- Founded: 2014
- Founder: Vineet Jain
- Headquarters: Mumbai, Maharashtra, India
- Key people: Amrita Pandey (CEO); Priti Shahani (Former President)
- Products: Films
- Services: Film production and distribution

Junglee Pictures is a film production and distribution company that was established by Vineet Jain of The Times Group in 2014. As of 2022, the company has produced nine Hindi films.

Their first release came out in 2015 with Zoya Akhtar's family drama Dil Dhadakne Do. In the same year, they produced Meghna Gulzar's crime drama Talvar, which won two National Film Awards.

Junglee Pictures went on to collaborate with the actor Ayushmann Khurrana in three films, the romantic comedy Bareilly Ki Barfi (2017), the comedy-drama Badhaai Ho (2018), and campus medical comedy film, Doctor G (2022). Badhaai Ho (2018) became the company's highest-grossing release. They also reunited with Gulzar in the Alia Bhatt-starring spy film Raazi (2018), which ranks among the highest-grossing female-led Hindi films.

== History ==
Before Junglee Pictures, The Times Group was already involved into film production and distribution through Times Infotainment Media Limited. Their first feature film was Being Cyrus (2005), an Indian English-language drama directed by Homi Adajania and starring Saif Ali Khan and Naseeruddin Shah. Later, they rebranded the company as Mirchi Movies and produced Hindi and Tamil movies such as Hari Puttar: A Comedy of Terrors (2008) Velli Thirai (2008) Aloo Chaat (2009) and With Love, Delhi! (2011)

In February 2014, Vineet Jain of The Times Group re-established the company as Junglee Pictures. The newly formed company's first film release came the following year with Dil Dhadakne Do, a family drama directed by Zoya Akhtar, which featured an ensemble cast headlined by Anil Kapoor, Shefali Shah, Priyanka Chopra, Ranveer Singh, Anushka Sharma and Farhan Akhtar. A significant portion of the film was photographed in the Pullmantur Cruises ship MS Sovereign. The film received positive reviews for its performances and direction, but received criticism for its running time and climax. It earned ₹145 crores against a budget of ₹83 crores.

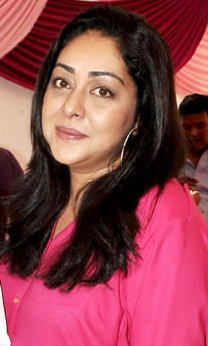
Meghna Gulzar has directed two films for the company, Talvar (2015) and Raazi (2018)

The company's second film release came in the same year with Bangistan (2015), a comedy directed by Karan Anshuman, and starring Riteish Deshmukh and Pulkit Samrat. Keen to "tell stories that were inspired by real incidents", Junglee Pictures next produced Talvar, a partly fictional retelling of the 2008 Noida double murder case. Starring Irrfan Khan, Konkona Sen Sharma, Neeraj Kabi and Sohum Shah, the film was directed by Meghna Gulzar and penned by Vishal Bhardwaj. Bhardwaj has said that his screenplay was influenced by the Rashomon effect (in which the same event is given different interpretations by the individuals involved). Rajeev Masand termed the film a "gripping, then baffling, and ultimately disturbing account" of the murder, "deliberately unsentimental and melodrama-free". Joe Leydon of Variety called the film's screenplay "solidly constructed" and its narrative "satisfyingly brisk". Talvar won two awards each at the National Film Awards and the Filmfare Award ceremonies, including the Best Adapted Screenplay Award for Bhardwaj at the former.

In 2017, the company produced the romantic comedy Bareilly Ki Barfi, directed by Ashwiny Iyer Tiwari and written by Nitesh Tiwari and Shreyas Jain. It starred Ayushmann Khurrana, Kriti Sanon and Rajkummar Rao and tells the story of a love triangle involving a headstrong young woman living in Bareilly, Uttar Pradesh. Rohit Vats of Hindustan Times praised the film for effectively capturing "the flavour of small-town India". It emerged as a sleeper hit. At the 63rd Filmfare Awards, the film won Best Director for Tiwari and Best Supporting Actor for Rao.

Junglee Pictures had two film releases in 2018. The spy film Raazi marked their second collaboration with Meghna Gulzar. Starring Alia Bhatt and Vicky Kaushal, the film is an adaptation of Harinder Sikka's novel Calling Sehmat, which was inspired by real events of a Kashmiri spy who married a Pakistani policeman prior to the Indo-Pakistani War of 1971. The film emerged as one of the highest-grossing Hindi films featuring a female protagonist. The company's second film release that year came with Badhaai Ho, starring Ayushmann Khurrana, Neena Gupta, Gajraj Rao, and Sanya Malhotra, which is about a middle-aged couple who get pregnant much to the disappointment of their adult son. Both Raazi and Badhaai Ho gained critical acclaim and rank among the highest-grossing Hindi films of 2018. The latter earned over ₹221 crores to emerge as the company's biggest commercial success. Both films also won several awards at the 64th Filmfare Awards, with Raazi winning a leading five, including Best Film and Best Director for Gulzar.

The company's sole film release of 2019 came with Chuck Russell's Junglee, an adventure film starring Vidyut Jammwal, which performed poorly at the box office. Future projects of the company include Vishal Bhardwaj's crime film based on the murder of Pradyuman Thakur. Junglee Pictures will also produce an as-yet untitled web series adapted from Arnab Ray's novel The Mahabharata Murders.

In March 2020, Junglee Pictures announced spiritual sequel of Badhaai Ho, titled Badhaai Do starring Rajkummar Rao and Bhumi Pednekar. On 11 February 2022, Badhaai Do released in theatres to critical acclaim.

Their ninth film, Doctor G is slated for release on 14 October 2022. It is a campus medical comedy film directed by Anubhuti Kashyap (in her directorial debut). It stars Ayushmann Khurrana (third collaboration with actor) and Rakul Preet Singh

Their tenth film,Babli Bouncer, was released on 23 September 2022. It is a comedy-drama film directed by Madhur Bhandarkar. The film stars Tamannaah Bhatia in the lead role, marking her first collaboration with the production house.

In May 2023, Junglee Pictures announced their upcoming film Ulajh, directed by Sudhanshu Saria. The film stars Janhvi Kapoor, Gulshan Devaiah, and Roshan Mathew, and is set in the world of Indian Foreign Services. The film was released on 2 August 2024.

In June 2024, Junglee Pictures, under the name of Maverik Movies Pvt Ltd, announced their upcoming film Varaaham, directed by Sanal V Devan. The cast includes Suresh Gopi, Suraj Venjaramoodu, Gautham Vasudev Menon, Navya Nair, and Prachi Tehlan, among others.

In September 2024, the company announced their upcoming film Dosa King, directed by T. J. Gnanavel.

== Filmography ==
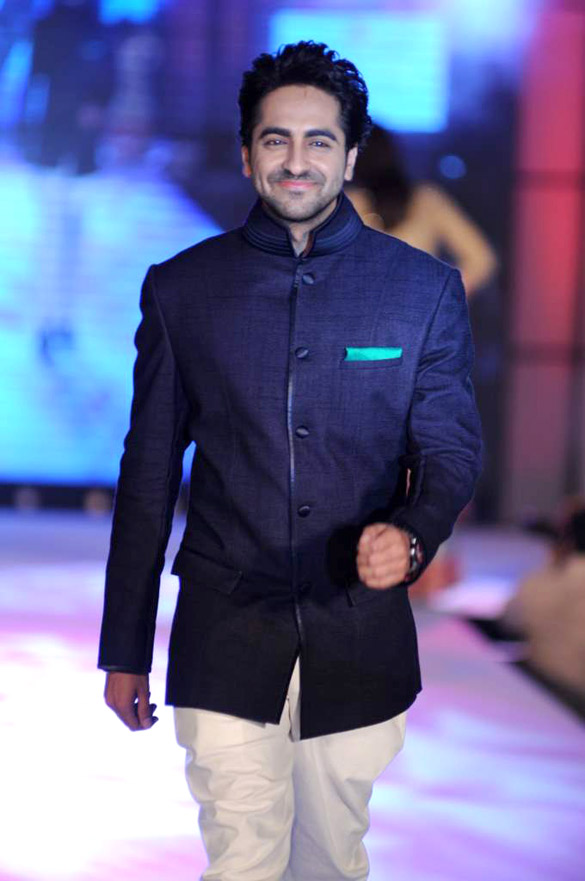
Ayushmann Khurrana has collaborated with Junglee Pictures on three projects

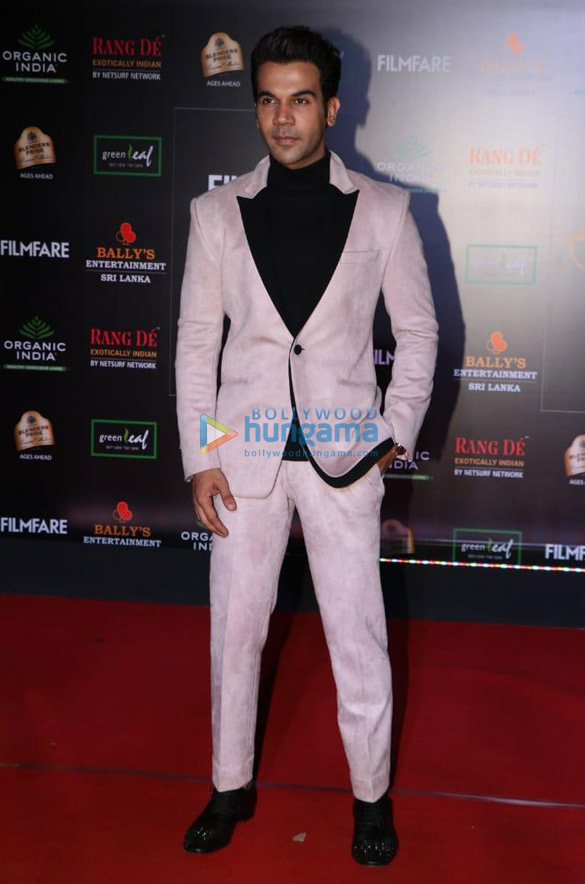
Rajkumar Rao has played leading role in two films

Key
†	Denotes films that have not yet been released

Year	Title	Director	Cast	Co-producer	Notes
2005	Being Cyrus	Homi Adajania	Saif Ali Khan, Naseeruddin Shah, Dimple Kapadia	Miracle Cinefilms; Serendipity Films	Produced under "Times Infotainment Media Ltd"
2008	Hari Puttar: A Comedy of Terrors	Lucky Kohli & Rajesh Bajaj	Sarika, Zain Khan, Swini Khara, Jackie Shroff		Produced under "Mirchi Movies Ltd"
2008	Velli Thirai	Viji	Prithviraj Sukumaran, Prakash Raj, Gopika	Duet Movies Prakash Raj Production	Tamil film
2009	Aloo Chaat	Robbie Grewal	Aftab Shivdasani, Aamna Sharif, Linda Arsenio		
2010	I M 24	Saurabh Shukla	Rajat Kapoor, Ranvir Shorey, Neha Dhupia	Planman Motion Pictures	Distribution only
2010	Payback	Sachin P. Karande	Sara Khan, Gulshan Grover, Zakir Hussain, Mukesh Tiwari	Archangel Entertainment	Distribution only
2011	Aashiqui.in	Shankhadeep	Ishaan Singh Manhas	Shetia Audio Video Productions	Distribution only
2011	Dear Friend Hitler	Rakesh Ranjan Kumar	Raghubir Yadav, Neha Dhupia, Aman Verma	Amrapali Media Vision	Distribution only
2011	With Love, Delhi!	Nikhil Singh	Pariva Pranati, Tom Alter	Redmat Reves Films	Distribution only
2011	Be Careful	Chandrakant Singh	Tanisha Mukherjee, Johnny Lever, Rajneesh Duggal	T-Series Films; United Color Entertainment	Distribution only
2013	Shortcut Romeo	Susi Ganesan	Neil Nitin Mukesh, Ameesha Patel, Puja Gupta	Susi Ganesan Production	
2015	Dil Dhadakne Do	Zoya Akhtar	Anil Kapoor, Shefali Shah, Priyanka Chopra, Ranveer Singh, Anushka Sharma, Farhan Akhtar	Excel Entertainment	First film to be produced through Junglee Pictures
2015	Bangistan	Karan Anshuman	Riteish Deshmukh, Pulkit Samrat	Excel Entertainment	
2015	Talvar	Meghna Gulzar	Irrfan Khan, Konkona Sen Sharma, Neeraj Kabi, Sohum Shah	VB Pictures	
2017	Bareilly Ki Barfi	Ashwiny Iyer Tiwari	Ayushmann Khurrana, Kriti Sanon, Rajkummar Rao	BR Chopra Films	
2018	Raazi	Meghna Gulzar	Alia Bhatt, Vicky Kaushal	Dharma Productions	
2018	Badhaai Ho	Amit Sharma	Ayushmann Khurrana, Neena Gupta, Gajraj Rao, Sanya Malhotra	Chrome Pictures	
2019	Junglee	Chuck Russell	Vidyut Jammwal, Pooja Sawant, Asha Bhat		
2022	Badhaai Do	Harshavardhan Kulkarni	Rajkummar Rao, Bhumi Pednekar		
2022	Doctor G	Anubhuti Kashyap	Ayushmann Khurrana, Rakul Preet Singh		
2022	Babli Bouncer	Madhur Bhandarkar	Tamannaah	Star Studios	
2024	Ulajh	Sudhanshu Saria	Janhvi Kapoor, Gulshan Devaiah		
2025	Ronth	Shahi Kabir	Dileesh Pothan, Roshan Mathew		
2025	Haq	Suparn Verma	Yami Gautam Dhar, Emraan Hashmi	Insomnia Films, Baweja Studios	
2026	Daayra	Meghna Gulzar	Kareena Kapoor, Prithviraj Sukumaran	Pen Studios	
