= Raazi =

2018 Indian film by Meghna Gulzar

- Theatrical release poster
- Directed by: Meghna Gulzar
- Screenplay by: Bhavani Iyer; Meghna Gulzar
- Dialogues by: Meghna Gulzar
- Story by: Harinder Sikka
- Based on: Calling Sehmat by Harinder Sikka
- Produced by: Vineet Jain; Karan Johar; Hiroo Yash Johar; Apoorva Mehta
- Starring: Alia Bhatt; Vicky Kaushal; Jaideep Ahlawat
- Cinematography: Jay I. Patel
- Edited by: Nitin Baid
- Music by: Shankar–Ehsaan–Loy
- Production companies: Junglee Pictures; Dharma Productions
- Distributed by: AA Films
- Release date: 11 May 2018
- Running time: 140 minutes
- Country: India
- Language: Hindi
- Budget: ₹35−40 crore
- Box office: est. ₹190−207 crore

Raazi (transl. Agreement/Secretive) is a 2018 Indian Hindi-language spy thriller film directed by Meghna Gulzar and produced by Vineet Jain, Karan Johar, Hiroo Yash Johar and Apoorva Mehta under the banners of Junglee Pictures and Dharma Productions. It stars Alia Bhatt, alongside Vicky Kaushal, Rajit Kapur, Shishir Sharma, and Jaideep Ahlawat. The film is an adaptation of Harinder Sikka's 2008 novel Calling Sehmat, a true account of an Indian Research and Analysis Wing (RAW) agent who, upon her father's request, is married into a family of military officers in Pakistan to relay information to India, prior to the Indo-Pakistani War of 1971.

Principal photography began in July 2017 in Mumbai and concluded on 27 October 2017. It was shot across several locations including Patiala, Nabha, Malerkotla and Doodhpathri.

Raazi was released on 11 May 2018 to positive reviews. Made on a budget of ₹350 million (US$3.6 million), Raazi went on to gross ₹195.75 crore (US$20 million) worldwide, emerging as one of the highest-grossing Indian films featuring a female lead. It was also a critical success, with Meghna's direction and Bhatt's performance receiving praise. At the 64th Filmfare Awards, Raazi received 15 nominations and won a leading 5 awards (tying with Andhadhun), including Best Film, Best Director (Gulzar) and Best Actress (Bhatt).

== Plot ==
Preceding the Bangladeshi War of Independence, 1971, Hidayat Khan is an Indian intelligence agent posing as an informant for the Pakistani military. Presenting as an Indian traitor trading secrets to Pakistan, he cultivates a friendship with Brigadier Parvez Syed of the Pakistan Army and is alerted of an operation planned against India. Fearing he will not live long enough to uncover further details due to his lung cancer, he asks his 20-year-old daughter Sehmat, a student at Delhi University, to become an undercover agent of the Research and Analysis Wing, India's external intelligence agency, in Pakistan through an arranged marriage with Syed's younger son, Major Iqbal, a Pakistani military officer. Sehmat joins the RAW and is trained by senior RAW officer Manav Chaudhary alias Khalid Mir and his assistant, Nikhil Bakshi. Despite her youth and inexperience, Sehmat is a quick study, surprising her superiors with her acumen for intelligence work. After her marriage, she moves to their home with Iqbal in Rawalpindi, the Pakistan Army's headquarters. Sehmat wins the trust of the entire family except Abdul, Syed's trusted servant. A kind man, Iqbal is patient with Sehmat, frequently apologising to her for his father's denigration of India. Feelings develop between them leading to consummation of their marriage, and they start falling in love. Despite her feelings, Sehmat remains true to her mission and establishes communication channels with her handlers back in India, relaying information.

Brigadier Syed is promoted to Major General, resulting in crucial documents and members of their defense forces passing through his house. Sehmat relays information on the planning of an offensive against India, which points to a planned attack by a Pakistani submarine on the Indian aircraft carrier INS Vikrant, then deployed in the Bay of Bengal. Abdul discovers Sehmat's communication tools in her bathroom and realises she is an Indian spy. He rushes off to tell Syed, forcing Sehmat to run him down with an army jeep, causing a heavy emotional toll on her. Abdul tries to reveal Sehmat's name in the hospital before he dies, and Iqbal's older brother, Mehboob, starts an investigation. Before he can provide his information to the ISI, Pakistan's internal security agency, Sehmat reluctantly kills him by injecting him with poison. Realising her cover is about to be blown, Mir visits her in disguise and conveys to her an escape plan from Pakistan. Later, Iqbal finds the communication tools concealed in Abdul's room alongside a piece of an anklet he had given Sehmat as a wedding gift, discovering her secret.

Heartbroken, he confronts Sehmat, who tearfully holds him at gunpoint and tells him her duty is to her country. Before their confrontation can escalate, Mehboob's young son, whom Sehmat had been tutoring to sing a patriotic song for his school's annual Army Day celebration, rushes in, giving her a chance to get away. Realising her duty requires her to kill both the boy and her driver to prevent them from discovering her identity, she walks away and arrives at the meeting point concealed in a burqa. Iqbal confronts her there, having notified the ISI, but when Mir spots them, he orders his undercover RAW team to shoot Sehmat and throws a grenade, killing both Sehmat and Iqbal. Mir and his team escape to a safe house, where the real Sehmat shows up, revealing the woman who died in the blast with Iqbal was another secret agent she had switched places with before Iqbal caught up to her. Traumatised by her husband's death and Mir's orders to kill her, Sehmat returns with the RAW team to her hometown. She faints shortly after arriving and later discovers she is pregnant, deciding to keep Iqbal's child.

Newsreel footage reveals the Indian Navy was able to sink the Pakistani submarine PNS Ghazi before it could carry out its planned attack on the INS Vikrant with the assistance of Sehmat's findings. In the present-day, Indian Army officer Lieutenant General Nikhil Bakshi addresses a group of officers and soldiers of tri-services and also cadets of NDA, including officer Colonel Samar Syed, aboard the Indian aircraft carrier INS Viraat, off the coast of Visakhapatnam. Colonel Samar Syed is revealed to be Iqbal and Sehmat's son. Sehmat Khan's sacrifices are remembered. The movie ends with a bungalow shown in an unknown location where a now-elderly Sehmat is living under security but alone.

== Cast ==
- Alia Bhatt as Sehmat Syed (née Khan), an undercover RAW agent
- Vicky Kaushal as Iqbal Syed
- Jaideep Ahlawat as Manav Chaudhary alias Khalid Mir, a senior RAW officer
- Rajit Kapur as Hidayat Khan
- Shishir Sharma as Brigadier (later Major General) Parvaz Syed
- Ashwath Bhatt as Mehboob Syed
- Soni Razdan as Teji Khan
- Arif Zakaria as Abdul Ahmed
- Amruta Khanvilkar as Munira Syed
- Kanwaljit Singh as Lieutenant General Nikhil Bakshi
  - Aman Vasishth as young Nikhil Bakshi
- Rajesh Jais as Sarwar
- Pallavi Batra as Mitali
- Sanjay Suri as Colonel Samar Syed (cameo appearance)

== Production ==
=== Development ===
Since 2014, Priti Sahani, president of Junglee Pictures, was trying to acquire the film rights to Harinder S. Sikka's 2008 novel Calling Sehmat, which details the true story of an Indian woman secret agent married to a Pakistani army officer to provide the Research and Analysis Wing (RAW) with confidential information prior to the Indo-Pakistani War of 1971. During the production of Talvar (2015), she got in touch with Meghna Gulzar and enquired if she was interested in directing a film adaptation of the novel. Meghna agreed but was informed a few months later that the film didn't materialize. In February 2016, she was approached by another producer to adapt the same novel, and she agreed again, thinking it was "a tad serendipitous" to be offered the same project twice.

When talks on that proposal also fell through, Meghna decided she had "a karmic connection" with Calling Sehmat given that Sikka had approached her father Gulzar to direct the film adaptation when the novel was released; she had developed a rapport with Sikka during previous meetings while discussing the production and told the author that they approach Sahani again for the film adaptation. The talks were successful, and in December 2016, Meghna announced the project as her next film. Meghna was drawn to the story as it was "an ordinary girl's extraordinary feat" and was "not chest-thumpingly anti-Pak, pro-India, pro-war sloganeering", and it being a true account "makes [the film] that much more powerful". She tried to remain as true to the story as possible during production.

Even though the film was set in the backdrop of the Indo-Pakistani War of 1971, it didn't feature action scenes unlike other films under the same backdrop since the story leads to the beginning of the war and not the actual conflict. Meghna had heard stories of the war from her family members, having been born after the war was over. She felt it was "an important milestone in [Indian] history" and was motivated to make the film as the story is important in present times when neighboring countries have non-cordial relationships. Meghna said: "The human element makes it timeless. From my father’s friends in Pakistan, I understand that the lines are on paper and brought up politically but at the end of the day, we’re similar in our clothes, cuisine, and culture."

In December 2016, it was being speculated that Alia Bhatt had been offered the lead role in the film, a news which was confirmed to be true in April 2017. Karan Johar's production house Dharma Productions came on board to co-produce the film along with Junglee Pictures in April 2017. The casting of Vicky Kaushal was officially announced in June 2017.

=== Filming ===
The filming process of Raazi began in July 2017 and the first schedule which took place in Mumbai was wrapped up by mid-August 2017. Originally, the first schedule of Raazi was supposed to be held in Jammu and Kashmir but due to the state of unrest in the valley, the makers decided to shift the shooting location to Mumbai where all the indoor scenes were filmed at a set created inside Film City. The second schedule of the film took place in Punjab, where filming was done in Patiala and Malerkotla during August and September 2017. The shooting in Patiala was stalled for a few days due to the violence that erupted after the conviction of Dera Sacha Sauda chief Gurmeet Ram Rahim Singh on 25 August 2017 and the curfew that was imposed as a consequence of which. After completing the Punjab schedule, the production team of Raazi arrived in Srinagar on 17 September 2017 for a ten-day schedule where filming was done at Pahalgam, Shiv Pora in Srinagar and Doodhpathri in Budgam district. The final schedule of shooting was supposed to take place in Punjab, but was completed in Delhi instead due to the unrest caused by Gurmeet Ram Rahim Singh's arrest. Filming came to an end on 27 October 2017.

Costumes for the film were designed by Maxima Basu.

== Controversy ==
Amidst a heated atmosphere of public anger and discussion during July 2020, Sikka alleged that Meghna changed the title of the film without his permission and he was not shown the director's cut of the film which was part of the contract. He also alleged that Gulzar and her father took a pro-Pakistani stand in the film, and that producers Jain and Johar attempted to discredit him.

The author also claimed that Meghna Gulzar "tweaked" the story to demean RAW and praised the Pakistan Army. In 2026, he called his decision to appoint Meghna as "his gravest misjudgement", and that "her ideological bias diminished the true spirit of the protagonist".

“I wasn’t willing to sell the rights of the book but agreed because of a promise to (poet-filmmaker and Meghna’s father) Gulzar,” he shares, adding, “My problem is that she removed the tricolour from the movie, while the Pakistani flag was flaunted. Even the Pakistani army was shown in a soft light. While in the book the protagonist was welcomed with (the Indian national anthem) Jana Gana Mana when she returned to India, all that was missing in the film. The climax was made to show that Sehmat made a mistake by fighting for India, which harmed the cause of Kashmiris".

== Soundtrack ==
The music and background score for the film was composed by Shankar–Ehsaan–Loy while the lyrics were written by Gulzar. The songs featured in the film are sung by Arijit Singh, Harshdeep Kaur, Vibha Saraf, Shankar Mahadevan and Sunidhi Chauhan. The song "Ae Watan" also contains the lyrics of Allama Iqbal's nazm "Lab Pe Aati Hai Dua", the national prayer of Pakistan. The soundtrack was officially released on 19 April 2018 by Zee Music Company.

== Release ==
The first poster of Raazi was released on 9 April 2018 through the official Twitter handle of the film, while the trailer of the film was launched on 10 April 2018. The film was released on 11 May 2018.

== Reception ==
=== Critical response ===
Raazi received universal critical acclaim. On the review aggregator website Rotten Tomatoes, 100% of 11 critics' reviews are positive, with an average rating of 7.9/10.

Anna M. M. Vetticad of Firstpost termed the film as a heart-stopping, heartbreaking espionage drama and gave it 4.5 stars out of 5. The Times of India rated the film 4 out of 5 stars, stating that "Raazi rewrites the spy-thriller genre with emotions, instead of explosions." Rohit Vats of Hindustan Times praised Alia Bhatt's performance and gave the film a rating of 4 out of 5 saying that, "Raazi is a sensibly written and finely performed film that takes a close look at the ordinary lives of extraordinary people. Not to miss." Shalini Langer of The Indian Express praised director Meghna Gulzar for not allowing Raazi to become a "chest-thumping spectacle of jingoism" and gave the film a rating of 3.5 out of 5 saying that, "at a time when hate and anger are the currency of the subcontinent, a film like Raazi needs to be made." Meena Iyer of Daily News and Analysis gave the film a rating of 4 out of 5, saying that, "Alia Bhatt-Vicky Kaushal starrer will blow your mind!" Sukanya Verma of Rediff.com appreciated the acting performances of the film, its music composed by Shankar–Ehsaan–Loy, cinematography as well as editing, and gave the film a rating of 4 out of 5 saying that, "Raazi is a rarity. It is intense, riveting, clever, dark, sad, lyrical, heartfelt, relevant and understated." Rajeev Masand of News18 gave the film a rating of 3.5, calling Bhatt the "beating heart of Raazi", and stated, "The film is admirable also because it's a measured, mostly intelligent thriller that asks us to consider concepts of patriotism and honor without spoon-feeding us with manipulative background music or provocative dialogue." Bollywood Hungama gave the film a rating of 3.5 out of 5, saying that, "Raazi is an interesting thriller brilliantly narrated by Meghna Gulzar that makes for mature viewing. It is a film that celebrates nationalism that is devoid of the colors of religion." Suhani Singh from India Today gave the film 2.5 out of 5 stars stating "Alia Bhatt steals the show in Meghna Gulzar's spy thriller".

In a negative review, Kennith Rosario of The Hindu commented, "There's a lot going for Raazi yet there's a nagging lack of novelty – whether it is the film's plot, message or Bhatt's ability to cry." Raja Sen of NDTV gave the film a rating of 3 out of 5 saying that, "There is a lot to like in Meghna Gulzar's spy movie, but Alia Bhatt makes it hard to take Raazi seriously." Nandini Ramnath of Scroll.in said that, "Alia Bhatt shines in a muddled and improbable spy thriller."

=== Box office ===
Raazi emerged as the tenth highest-grossing Hindi film of 2018. It became the second film driven by a female lead to gross more than ₹ 100 crore nett in India, after Tanu Weds Manu Returns. The film grossed more than ₹158 crore in India, emerging as the highest-grossing film for Alia Bhatt, surpassing Badrinath Ki Dulhania. Raazi has grossed a total of ₹2.07 billion (US$21 million) worldwide.

== Accolades ==
Award (Note: Awards, festivals and organizations are in alphabetical order.)	Date of ceremony (Note: Date is linked to the article about the awards held that year, wherever possible.)	Category	Recipient(s)	Result	Ref.
Filmfare Awards	23 March 2019	Best Film	Dharma Productions – Karan Johar, Hiroo Yash Johar, Apoorva Mehta	Won	
Filmfare Awards	23 March 2019	Best Film (Critics)	Meghna Gulzar	Nominated	
Filmfare Awards	23 March 2019	Best Director	Meghna Gulzar	Won	
Filmfare Awards	23 March 2019	Best Actress	Alia Bhatt	Won	
Filmfare Awards	23 March 2019	Best Actress (Critics)	Alia Bhatt	Nominated	
Filmfare Awards	23 March 2019	Best Music Director	Shankar–Ehsaan–Loy	Nominated	
Filmfare Awards	23 March 2019	Best Lyricist	Gulzar – "Ae Watan"	Won	
Filmfare Awards	23 March 2019	Best Lyricist	Gulzar – "Dilbaro"	Nominated	
Filmfare Awards	23 March 2019	Best Male Playback Singer	Arijit Singh – "Ae Watan"	Won	
Filmfare Awards	23 March 2019	Best Male Playback Singer	Shankar Mahadevan – "Dilbaro"	Nominated	
Filmfare Awards	23 March 2019	Best Female Playback Singer	Harshdeep Kaur, Vibha Saraf – "Dilbaro"	Nominated	
Filmfare Awards	23 March 2019	Best Female Playback Singer	Sunidhi Chauhan – "Ae Watan"	Nominated	
Filmfare Awards	23 March 2019	Best Screenplay	Bhavani Iyer and Meghna Gulzar	Nominated	
Filmfare Awards	23 March 2019	Best Editing	Nitin Baid	Nominated	
Filmfare Awards	23 March 2019	Best Background Score	Shankar–Ehsaan–Loy and Tubby	Nominated	
Indian Film Festival of Melbourne	10 August 2018	Best Film	Raazi	Nominated	
Indian Film Festival of Melbourne	10 August 2018	Best Director	Meghna Gulzar	Nominated	
Indian Film Festival of Melbourne	10 August 2018	Best Actress	Alia Bhatt	Nominated	
International Indian Film Academy Awards	18 September 2019	Best Film	Raazi	Won	
International Indian Film Academy Awards	18 September 2019	Best Director	Meghna Gulzar	Nominated	
International Indian Film Academy Awards	18 September 2019	Best Actor	Vicky Kaushal	Nominated	
International Indian Film Academy Awards	18 September 2019	Best Actress	Alia Bhatt	Won	
International Indian Film Academy Awards	18 September 2019	Best Story	Harinder Singh Sikka	Nominated	
International Indian Film Academy Awards	18 September 2019	Best Music Director	Shankar–Ehsaan–Loy	Nominated	
International Indian Film Academy Awards	18 September 2019	Best Lyricist	Gulzar – "Ae Watan"	Nominated	
International Indian Film Academy Awards	18 September 2019	Best Male Playback Singer	Arijit Singh – "Ae Watan"	Won	
International Indian Film Academy Awards	18 September 2019	Best Female Playback Singer	Harshdeep Kaur & Vibha Saraf – "Dilbaro"	Won	
International Indian Film Academy Awards	18 September 2019	Best Female Playback Singer	Sunidhi Chauhan – "Ae Watan"	Nominated	
Mirchi Music Awards	16 February 2019	Lyricist of The Year	Gulzar – "Ae Watan (Male)"	Won	
Mirchi Music Awards	16 February 2019	Lyricist of The Year	Gulzar – "Dilbaro"	Nominated	
Mirchi Music Awards	16 February 2019	Song of The Year	"Dilbaro"	Nominated	
Mirchi Music Awards	16 February 2019	Song of The Year	"Ae Watan (Male)"	Nominated	
Mirchi Music Awards	16 February 2019	Album of The Year	Shankar–Ehsaan–Loy, Gulzar, Allama Iqbal	Nominated	
Mirchi Music Awards	16 February 2019	Male Vocalist of The Year	Arijit Singh – "Ae Watan (Male)"	Nominated	
Mirchi Music Awards	16 February 2019	Female Vocalist of The Year	Harshdeep Kaur – "Dilbaro"	Nominated	
Mirchi Music Awards	16 February 2019	Female Vocalist of The Year	Sunidhi Chauhan – "Ae Watan (Female)"	Nominated	
Mirchi Music Awards	16 February 2019	Best Background Score	Shankar–Ehsaan–Loy and Tubby	Nominated	
Mirchi Music Awards	16 February 2019	Listeners' Choice Album of the Year	Shankar–Ehsaan–Loy, Gulzar, Allama Iqbal	Nominated	
NBT Utsav Awards	30 June 2018	Best Actress	Alia Bhatt	Won	
News18 Reel Movie Awards	26 March 2019	Best Actress	Alia Bhatt	Won	
News18 Reel Movie Awards	26 March 2019	Best Lyricist	Gulzar	Won	
News18 Reel Movie Awards	26 March 2019	Best Female Playback Singer	Harshdeep Kaur, Vibha Saraf – "Dilbaro"	Won	
News18 Reel Movie Awards	26 March 2019	Best Editing	Nitin Baid	Won	
Screen Awards	16 December 2018	Best Actress	Alia Bhatt	Won	
Screen Awards	16 December 2018	Best Male Playback Singer	Arijit Singh (for the song "Ae Watan")	Won	
Screen Awards	16 December 2018	Best Female Playback Singer	Harshdeep Kaur (for the song "Dilbaro")	Won	
Screen Awards	16 December 2018	Best Lyricist	Gulzar (for the song "Ae Watan")	Won	
Screen Awards	16 December 2018	Best Production Design	Amit Ray, Subrata Roy	Won	
Zee Cine Awards	19 March 2019	Best Film	Vineet Jain, Hiroo Yash Johar, Karan Johar and Apoorva Mehta	Won	
Zee Cine Awards	19 March 2019	Best Director	Meghna Gulzar	Nominated	
Zee Cine Awards	19 March 2019	Best Actor – Female (Popular)	Alia Bhatt	Won	
Zee Cine Awards	19 March 2019	Best Actor – Female (Critics)	Alia Bhatt	Nominated	
Zee Cine Awards	19 March 2019	Best Supporting Actor – Male	Jaideep Ahlawat	Nominated	
Zee Cine Awards	19 March 2019	Best Music Director	Shankar–Ehsaan–Loy	Nominated	
Zee Cine Awards	19 March 2019	Best Lyrics	Gulzar for "Dilbaro"	Won	
Zee Cine Awards	19 March 2019	Best Lyrics	Gulzar for "Ae Watan"	Nominated	
Zee Cine Awards	19 March 2019	Best Playback Singer – Male	Arijit Singh for "Ae Watan"	Nominated	
Zee Cine Awards	19 March 2019	Best Playback Singer – Female	Harshdeep Kaur and Vibha Saraf for "Dilbaro"	Won	

== See also ==
- The Ghazi Attack
