= Asif Panjwani =

Indian musician

- Asif Panjwani at recording studio in Mumbai

Background information
- Born: 10 October 1989 (age 37); Mumbai, Maharashtra, India
- Genres: Sufi, Indian Film Music, Indie-pop
- Occupations: Indian Music Composer, Record Producer, Song Writer
- Years active: 2013–present

Asif Panjwani (Hindi: आसिफ पंजवानी, Urdu: آصف پنجوانی; born 10 October 1989) is an Indian music composer and record producer. He has composed background scores and original music for several Indian television series and independent music projects.

== Early life and education ==
Panjwani was born in Mumbai, Maharashtra. He received formal training in Indian classical music and Ghazal under Ustad Ghulam Abbas Khan of the Rampur-Sahaswan gharana. He holds a diploma in Urdu Ghazal, which informs his work in contemporary music composition and songwriting.

== Career ==
Panjwani began his career in 2007 as a music operator, assisting filmmaker and composer Neeraj Vora on the Gujarati theatrical production Putri Devo Bhava.

In television, he has provided original music and background scores for various networks including Zee TV and Life OK. His credits include the supernatural series Fear Files: Darr Ki Sacchi Tasvirein, Pyaar Tune Kya Kiya, and the sitcom Y.A.R.O Ka Tashan.

Panjwani has also composed for independent music labels, including Zee Music Company. His notable singles include "Jag Se Fanaa", performed by Mohammed Irfan, and "Dil Ki Aashiqui Tujhse Hi Hai", featuring Javed Ali.

== Discography ==
=== Television background scores ===
- Fear Files: Darr Ki Sacchi Tasvirein
- Pyaar Tune Kya Kiya
- Y.A.R.O Ka Tashan
- Savitri Devi College & Hospital
- Dil Dhoondta Hai
- Gujju Rocks
- Terror Strike

=== Singles ===
- "Jag Se Fanaa" (2024) – Mohammed Irfan
- "Mere Bhaijaan"
- "Dil Ki Aashiqui Tujhse Hi Hai" (2025) – Javed Ali
- "Hum Zubaan Ho Tum" – Zee Music Company
- "Shikve Hazaar" – Featuring Sakshi Holkar
