= Sam Bahadur (film) =

2023 Indian film by Meghna Gulzar

- Theatrical release poster
- Directed by: Meghna Gulzar
- Written by: Bhavani Iyer; Shantanu Shrivastava; Meghna Gulzar
- Produced by: Ronnie Screwvala
- Starring: Vicky Kaushal; Fatima Sana Shaikh; Sanya Malhotra; Govind Namdev
- Cinematography: Jay I. Patel
- Edited by: Nitin Baid
- Music by: Score: Ketan Sodha; Songs: Shankar–Ehsaan–Loy
- Production company: RSVP Movies
- Release date: 1 December 2023
- Running time: 148 minutes
- Country: India
- Language: Hindi
- Budget: ₹55 crore
- Box office: est. ₹128.17 crore

Sam Bahadur (stylised as SAMबहादुर; lit. transl. Sam the Brave) is a 2023 Indian Hindi-language biographical war drama film based on the life of India's first field marshal, Sam Manekshaw. It is directed by Meghna Gulzar who co-wrote the film with Bhavani Iyer and Shantanu Srivastava. Produced by Ronnie Screwvala, under the banner of RSVP Movies. It stars Vicky Kaushal in the title role, alongside Fatima Sana Shaikh, Sanya Malhotra, Neeraj Kabi, Edward Sonnenblick and Mohammed Zeeshan Ayyub.

Sam Bahadur was released on 1 December 2023 and received mixed reviews from critics. It was a commercial success, earning ₹128.17 crore (US$14 million) worldwide. At the 69th Filmfare Awards, the film received eight nominations, including Best Film (Critics), Best Actor and Best Actor (Critics) (both for Kaushal). At the 71st National Film Awards, the film won 3 awards: Best Feature Film Promoting National, Social and Environmental Values, Best Costume Design, and Best Make-up Artist.

== Plot ==
In 1934, cadet Sam Manekshaw is amongst the first batch of gentleman cadets to be trained at the Indian Military Academy, Dehradun; amongst his batchmates is his junior-rival, Tikka Khan. Graduating from the academy that year, he is posted as a second lieutenant to the 12th Frontier Force Regiment, Ferozpur. Soon after his appointment, he meets Siloo Bode, whom he later marries. In 1942, during the Second World War, Manekshaw, promoted to the acting rank of major, is sent with the regiment to participate in the Burma campaign. During the Battle of Sittang Bridge, he is wounded in action but survives and is awarded the Military Cross for gallantry.

In 1947, amidst the partition of the British Indian Army, Manekshaw is approached to join the Pakistan Army by his colleague, Yahya Khan; he chooses the Indian Army instead. Upon independence, discord emanates between the two countries over the sovereignty of Kashmir. In October 1947, Pakistan launches its military campaign to capture the region. In response, Indian prime minister Jawaharlal Nehru and home minister Vallabhbhai Patel dispatch Manekshaw and V. P. Menon to Kashmir; they succeed in securing the accession of Kashmir to India. India counter-attacks, but the war concludes in a stalemate.

In 1959, Manekshaw, now a major general and Commandant of the Defence Services Staff College, Wellington, is approached by defence minister V. K. Krishna Menon and Chief of General Staff Lt. Gen. Brij Mohan Kaul of his opinion on the Chief of Army Staff (COAS) Gen. K. S. Thimayya. Manekshaw, interpreting their actions as political interference, rebuffs them. However, Kaul conspires to stop Manekshaw's upcoming promotion by orchestrating a court-martial on the basis of impropriety; nevertheless, Manekshaw is exonerated by his superiors.

In 1962, the Sino-Indian War erupts, leading to the army being trounced by the Chinese; Kaul resigns while Nehru dismisses Menon. On the advice of Indira Gandhi, Nehru has Manekshaw promoted to lieutenant-general and assigns him as commanding officer of the IV Corps, Tezpur. He proposes an advance, but Nehru, forlorn from defeat, refuses; Indira intercedes in Manekshaw's favour. By 1963, Manekshaw manages to re-rally his troops in the North-East Frontier Agency. In 1964, Nehru dies, and Manekshaw is promoted as general officer commanding of the Eastern Command; two years later, Indira is appointed prime minister. Between 1965 and 1967, Manekshaw involves himself in the anti-insurgency operations against the Mizo National Front, for which he earns the Padma Bhushan.

In 1969, with discord amongst the Bengalis in East Pakistan rising, Yahya, now a general, is made Pakistan's president; elsewhere, Manekshaw is appointed as the Indian Army's next COAS and promoted to general as well. In 1970, the East Pakistan-based Awami League sweep Pakistan's general elections, however Yahya refuses to cede power to them, resulting in anti-government protests across Pakistan. In response, Yahya authorises Tikka, now a lieutenant-general, to initiate Operation Searchlight – a massive anti-Bengali pogrom, which he executes with ruthless efficiency. Considering the situation, Indira favours war, but Manekshaw opposes it, highlighting the army's hindrances; she agrees to wait. The U.S. warns Indira against war, but she rebuffs them. The army is mobilized and begins training the Mukti Bahini.

On 3 December 1971, Pakistan strikes first, launching pre-emptive attacks on Indian territory. India immediately responds with counter-attacks in Pakistan's western and eastern sectors. The opposing armies witness profound clashes, with Pakistan bearing numerous casualties on land, sea and air in both sectors. By 16 December, the Pakistani troops in the east, overwhelmed, surrender to the Eastern Command – ending the war. The conclusion cedes a political triumph to Indira while Yahya resigns from the humiliation of defeat. With Manekshaw's retirement approaching, Indira has him promoted to the rank of field-marshal in recognition of his wartime leadership, which he proudly accepts in January 1973, just a fortnight from his retirement.

== Cast ==
- Vicky Kaushal as Field Marshal Sam HFJ Manekshaw, the 7th Chief of the Army Staff, Indian Army.
- Jiyana Kapadia as Baby Sam
- Sanya Malhotra as Silloo Manekshaw, Manekshaw's wife.
- Fatima Sana Shaikh as Indira Gandhi, the 3rd Prime Minister of India.
- Govind Namdev as Vallabhbhai Patel, the 1st Deputy Prime Minister of India.
- Neeraj Kabi as Jawaharlal Nehru, the 1st Prime Minister of India.
- Mohammed Zeeshan Ayyub as Gen. Yahya Khan, the 3rd President of Pakistan and the 5th Commander-in-Chief of the Pakistan Army.
- Darius Chinoy as Air Chief Marshal Pratap Chandra Lal.
- Ravindra Vijay as Swami
- Bobby Arora as Major O. S. Kalkat, Indian Army.
- Aanjjan Srivastav as Yashwantrao Chavan, the 8th Minister of Defence.
- Atul Kale as K. B. Lall, Defence Secretary.
- Elango Kumaravel as V. K. Krishna Menon, the 7th Minister of Defence.
- Vivek Bahl as Sarvepalli Radhakrishnan, the 2nd President of India
- Sanjay Roy as Zakir Husain, the 3rd President of India
- Varun Narang as Sheikh Abdullah
- Manish Bomba as Gen. Abdul Hamid Khan, Chief of Staff, Pakistan Army.
- Upen Chauhan as Lt. Gen. Tikka Khan, Governor of East Pakistan.
- Rohan Verma as Capt. (later Lt. Gen.) Attiqur Rahman, Manekshaw's friend and later Governor of West Pakistan.
- Edward Sonnenblick as Lord Louis Mountbatten, Governor-General of India.
- Paul O'Neill as Maj. Gen. David Cowan, Commander 17th Infantry Division. British Indian Army.
- Richard Maddison as Lt. Col. Donnie Edward, British Indian Army.
- Sammy Jonas Heaney as Capt. McLaren, British Indian Army.
- Ed Robinson as Lt. D.A.D. Eykyn, British Indian Army.
- Jeffrey Goldberg as Henry Kissinger, United States Secretary of State.
- Richard Bhakti Klein as Kenneth Keating, United States Ambassador to India
- Krishna Kant Singh Bundela as Subedar Gurbaksh Singh, Indian Army
- Kalki Koechlin in a special appearance in the song "Dum Hai Toh Aaja."
- Narayan B.K. as Rifleman Tamang
- Shreyas Pardiwalla as Captain Behram Panthaki

== Production ==
=== Development ===
In 2017, Meghna Gulzar narrated the story of the biopic on Sam Manekshaw to Kaushal at the sets of Raazi which she planned to make her next film. Kaushal impressed by the idea decided that he would play the character. She then went for years of extensive research and writing collaborating with Bhavani Iyer and Shantanu Srivastava, also meeting with family members of Sam Manekshaw. The film marks the second collaboration between Gulzar and Kaushal. Their first film collaboration was the 2017 blockbuster Raazi. In 2021, the film was announced by RSVP Movies on the 107th birth anniversary of late Sam Manekshaw.

Sam Bahadur was filmed with real Indian army soldiers.

=== Casting ===
In December 2021, Shaikh and Malhotra joined the cast, marking their third collaboration together after Dangal and Ludo. Kabi joined in September 2022 to portray the role of Jawaharlal Nehru marking his second collaboration with Gulzar after Talvar. Kaushal has gone through extensive training in the army under the guidance of the Indian Army's 6 Sikh Regiment in preparing for his role. Kaushal in an interview with Film Companion revealed that the character would be his toughest onscreen role to date. The film will not have junior artists and instead real-life army personnel and people from the Defence Force have been cast.

=== Filming ===
Principal photography commenced on 8 August 2022. The film was shot over two years in 13 locations in India covering four decades of the life of Sam Manekshaw. Filming took place in Mumbai, Pune, Jodhpur, Pataudi, Chandigarh, Ooty, Dehradun, Kolkata, Patiala, Srinagar, Pahalgam, and Delhi. Filming wrapped on 14 March 2023.

== Music ==
Sam Bahadur

Soundtrack album by Shankar–Ehsaan–Loy
- Released: 27 November 2023
- Recorded: 2022
- Studios: Purple Haze Studios; YRF Studios
- Genre: Feature film soundtrack
- Length: 15:08
- Language: Hindi
- Label: Zee Music Company

Shankar–Ehsaan–Loy chronology
Dono (2023)	Sam Bahadur (2023)	The Archies (2023)

Official audio
- Sam Bahadur - Full Album on YouTube

The music of the film was composed by Shankar–Ehsaan–Loy while the lyrics are written by Gulzar. Background score is composed by Ketan Sodha. The first single titled "Badhte Chalo" was released on 13 November 2023. The second single titled "Banda" released on 22 November 2023.

Track listing
No.	Title	Singer(s)	Length
1.	"Badhte Chalo"	Shankar Mahadevan, Vishal Dadlani, Divya Kumar	4:03
2.	"Banda"	Shankar Mahadevan	3:59
3.	"Itni Si Baat"	Shreya Ghoshal, Sonu Nigam	4:15
4.	"Dum Hai Toh Aaja"	Sunidhi Chauhan	2:51
Total length:			15:08

== Release ==
=== Theatrical ===
The film was theatrically released on 1 December 2023, clashing with Ranbir Kapoor's Animal.

=== Home media ===
The film premiered on ZEE5 on 26 January 2024.

== Reception ==
=== Critical reception ===
Sam Bahadur received mixed reviews from critics and audiences. On the review aggregator website Rotten Tomatoes, 38% of 16 critics' reviews are positive, with an average rating of 5.9/10.

Catherine Bray of The Guardian rated the film 3 stars and stated "It's a perennial problem for biopics; how to give events the momentum of fiction when the underlying narrative is fact."

Subhash K. Jha of Times Now rated 3.5 stars out of 5, critisied "I am afraid Vicky Kaushal, a reasonably talented actor, is not equal to the task. ... But mimicking the original doesn’t quite amount to a comprehensive character creation." Shubhra Gupta of The Indian Express gave a rating 2.5/5 and wrote "It's hard to play a character so closely without becoming a caricature, but Kaushal becomes Sam Bahadur." Sukanya Verma of Rediff.com gave a rating of 2.5/5 and wrote, "Nothing that the movie tells isn't already available in the public domain." Mayank Shekhar of Mid-Day expressed "Vicky Kaushal is the last person I’d imagine as playing Manekshaw." Shekhar gave 3 stars to the movie and wrote "The trivia that follows is the film. Messing with no known facts, one bit. Only detailing them as they’re widely known." Anuj Kumar of The Hindu stated "The film critiques the relationship between the politicians and the military." Reviewing for Hindustan Times, Prannay Pathak spotted the music of the movie is underperforming. Pathak wrote "The film’s music is loud, distracting and unmelodious (the war anthem Badhte Chalo is unbelievably insipid and inelegant), which is surprising considering Shankar-Ehsaan-Loy’s obvious musical prowess and the trio’s last fabulous collaboration with Gulzar, Raazi." Anusha Sundar for The New Indian Express reviewed and wrote "Sam Bahadur is unfortunately apathetic to both its protagonist and the audience." Devesh Sharma of Filmfare rated the movie 3.5/5 stars and observed "Vicky Kaushal channels his inner Dev Anand to play the title character."

Nandini Ramnath of Scroll.in observed "The greatest hits approach leans on recorded history rather than compelling fiction for dramatic momentum." Pratikshya Mishra of The Quint commented "Sam Bahadur is relegated to the ranks of a simple biography." Tatsam Mukherjee of The Wire stated "Sam Bahadur is a painfully ‘safe’ film that is in much awe of its protagonist..."

Writing a review for Rediff.com, Lieutenant General Syed Ata Hasnain praised Meghna Gulzar's effort and stated "You have to grant it to Meghna's research team and those sourcing military hardware for the film." Tushar Joshi of India Today gave the movie 2.5 out of 5 stars and wrote "Sam Bahadur is a brave attempt, but it aimlessly meanders in most parts, trying to give us an insight into the life of one of the most revered and celebrated army officers. Perhaps, if the valiant Manekshaw had seen the film, he would have said, “It’s okay, sweetie! Better luck next time.” Saibal Chatterjee of NDTV gave the movie 3.5 out of 5 stars and wrote "An intense character study more than an action-heavy war movie, Sam Bahadur hits most of its targets. It blends the story of an illustrious life - it isn't exactly a from-the-cradle-to-the-grave affair although it does begin with the protagonist as a newborn in a crib - with the exploits of a legendary army man who brought remarkable dexterity to bear upon his job as a soldier and a leader".

=== Box office ===
On its first day, the film collected ₹6.25 crore, the second day ₹9 crore and the third day ₹10.30 crore. The film has earned ₹110.69 crore (US$12 million) in India and ₹17.48 crore (US$1.9 million) in overseas for a worldwide gross collection of ₹128.17 crore (US$14 million).

== Accolades ==
Award	Ceremony date	Category	Recipients	Result	Ref.
Filmfare Awards	28 January 2024	Best Film (Critics)	Meghna Gulzar	Nominated	
Filmfare Awards	28 January 2024	Best Actor	Vicky Kaushal	Nominated	
Filmfare Awards	28 January 2024	Best Actor (Critics)	Vicky Kaushal	Nominated	
Filmfare Awards	28 January 2024	Best Lyricist	Gulzar for "Itni Si Baat"	Nominated	
Filmfare Awards	28 January 2024	Best Production Design	Subrata Chakraborty and Amit Ray	Won	
Filmfare Awards	28 January 2024	Best Sound Design	Kunal Sharma	Won	
Filmfare Awards	28 January 2024	Best Background Score	Ketan Sodha	Nominated	
Filmfare Awards	28 January 2024	Best Costume Design	Sachin Lovelekar, Divvya Gambhir and Nidhhi Gambhir	Won	
Filmfare Awards	28 January 2024	Best Action	Parvez Shaikh	Nominated	
International Indian Film Academy Awards	28 September 2024	Best Film	Sam Bahadur	Nominated	
International Indian Film Academy Awards	28 September 2024	Best Actor	Vicky Kaushal	Nominated	
International Indian Film Academy Awards	28 September 2024	Best Supporting Actress	Sanya Malhotra	Nominated	
International Indian Film Academy Awards	28 September 2024	Best Lyricist	Gulzar – "Itni Si Baat"	Nominated	
National Film Awards	1 August 2025	Best Feature Film Promoting National, Social and Environmental Values	Meghna Gulzar, Unilazer Ventures Private Limited	Won	
National Film Awards	1 August 2025	Best Costume Design	Sachin Lovelekar, Divvya Gambhir and Nidhhi Gambhir	Won	
National Film Awards	1 August 2025	Best Make-up Artist	Shrikant Desai	Won	
