= Daayra =

2026 Indian film by Meghna Gulzar

- Theatrical release poster
- Directed by: Meghna Gulzar
- Written by: Meghna Gulzar; Sima Agarwal; Yash Keswani
- Produced by: Vineet Jain; Dhaval Gada
- Starring: Kareena Kapoor; Prithviraj Sukumaran
- Cinematography: Saurabh Goswami
- Edited by: Charu Shree Roy; Meghna Gulzar
- Music by: Songs: Amit Trivedi; Score: Ketan Sodha
- Production companies: Junglee Pictures; Pen Studios
- Distributed by: Pen Marudhar
- Release date: 18 September 2026
- Running time: 143 minutes
- Country: India
- Language: Hindi
- Budget: est. ₹50–55 crore (Note: Cinema Express reported the budget as ₹50 crore. Asianet News and The Free Press Journal reported the budget as ₹55 crore.)
- Box office: est. ₹8.36 crore

Daayra (transl. Circle) is a 2026 Indian Hindi-language crime thriller film co-written and directed by Meghna Gulzar. It was produced by Vineet Jain and Dhaval Jain under banner of Junglee Pictures and Pen Studios. Inspired by a true event, the film stars Kareena Kapoor and Prithviraj Sukumaran in leading roles. Besides Kapoor and Sukumaran, it also cast Kanwaljit Singh, Achint Kaur, Anuja Sathe, Seema Azmi, Biswapati Sarkar, Jitendra Joshi, and Upendra Chauhan.

Gulzar penned the lyrics, while Amit Trivedi composed the music and Ketan Sodha composed the background score. Saurabh Goswami served as the cinematographer, and Taran Bajaj was the casting director. Director Gulzar herself was the editor along with Charu Shree Roy.

Daayra was theatrically released on 18 September 2026, receiving positive reviews from critics. The film, however, marked the lowest opening in Kapoor's filmography. It emerged as a box-office bomb.

== Premise ==
Plot summary as on CBFC website:

"A police encounter following the brutal rape and murder of a young woman turns an ACP into a national hero but raises troubling questions about justice and the rule of law. When a determined female IPS officer is assigned to investigate, she uncovers inconsistencies that challenge the official narrative."

== Cast ==
- Kareena Kapoor as DCP Ajooni Kohli IPS
- Prithviraj Sukumaran as DCP Raman Kumar IPS
- Pragati Mishra as Ragini Pujari
- Prammod Sanghi as Abhinandan Basu
- Sumali Khaniwale as NGO Head
- Upendra Chauhan as Inspector Bishal Mishra
- Man Singh Karamati as Jacob Mechanic
- Md Ashanual Haque as SI Karthik Antony
- Aarti Desai as Padma
- Satish Badal as Yusuf
- Sumit Raina as Police Inspector
- Inzmam as Chhotu
- Ashutosh Kumar Gupta as Bablu Chaubey
- Jitendra Joshi as Inspectoor Karad
- Kanwaljit Singh as Ajooni's father
- Kshitee Jog as Parvati Pujari, Ragini's mother
- Bhavesh Babbani as Kabir, Ragini's brother
- Trupti Khamkar as SI Jyoti
- Biswapati Sarkar as Commissioner Anand
- Sandesh Kulkarni as Head Constable Vasu
- Ujjwal Chopra as JCP Abhinav Rao
- Brijbhushan Shukla as Bala
- Ajit Singh as Inspector Shekhar
- Ipshita Chakraborty Singh as Inspector Aarti
- Manoj Sharma as Constable Prasad
- Ram Diwakar as Raju
- Aditya Kumar as Mastan
- Abdul Mani as Mani
- Achint Kaur as Gomti Thakur
- Seema Azmi SP Indira Pandey
- Anuja Sathe as Raman's wife

== Production ==
=== Development ===
In 2020 during the COVID-19 lockdown in India, Meghna Gulzar was approached by Junglee Pictures to make Daayra, at that time she had already made her mind to direct Sam Bahadur (2023) next. She thought the subject would be always relevant, stating that the film tries to "explore the greys because everything is not black and white. What may be justice for you may be injustice for me, [...]".

Several news sources reported that the film is based on 2019 Hyderabad case. But Meghna Gulzar said that the "film does not draw its perspective from just one incident, instead the team looked at several cases while developing the story."

=== Casting ===
In April 2025, it was announced that Kareena Kapoor and Prithviraj Sukumaran would star in the crime thriller. Ayushmann Khurrana and later Sidharth Malhotra had previously been considered for the male lead, but both subsequently left the project due to scheduling conflicts.

=== Filming ===
Principal photography began on 25 September 2025. Filming concluded on 26 December 2025.

== Marketing ==
A trailer of the film was unveiled on 31 August 2026. On 15 September, a promotion trailer was released on YouTube.

== Soundtrack ==
Initially, Gulzar revealed that the film would feature no songs, as she felt that the screenplay did not provide scope for musical sequences. Her father, lyricist Gulzar stated that she believed songs would disrupt the narrative flow and instead chose to retain the story's established tone. However, a song titled “Sach Ka Daayra” was released on 11 September 2026, written by Gulzar, composed by Amit Trivedi and sung by B Praak.

Track listing
No.	Title	Lyrics	Music	Singer(s)	Length
1.	"Sach Ka Daayra"	Gulzar	Amit Trivedi	B Praak	2:14
Total length:					2:14

== Release ==
=== Theatrical ===
The film received an A certificate from the CBFC, along with a finalised runtime of 143 minutes. There was no visual cut and the violent scenes remain untouched expect a small modification in a dialogue by Khan.

A special screening premiered in Mumbai and Delhi on 17 September in presence of makers and former Chief Justice of India B. R. Gavai attended the Mumbai premier.

The film was theatrically released in Hindi and Malayalam on 18 September 2026, clashing with her brother-in-law Kunal Khemu's Vibe. Parvathy Thiruvothu lent her voice to Kareena Kapoor Khan's character for the Malayalam version of the film.

=== Home media ===
The film began streaming on Netflix from 13 November 2026.

== Reception ==
=== Box office ===
Daayra grossed ₹8.36 crore (US$890,000) worldwide. It grossed ₹6.54 crore (US$700,000) in India and ₹1.82 crore (US$190,000) in overseas market.

On its opening day, the film earned ₹0.94 crore net at the domestic box office. It earned ₹3.74 crore (US$400,000) net at India box office in the opening weekend.

=== Critical response ===
On the review aggregator website Rotten Tomatoes, 74% of 19 critics' reviews are positive, with an average rating of 6.6/10.

Subhash K Jha for The Tribune noted "Daayra gets it right most of the time. It deals with a complex moral issue with scrupulosity and sensibleness. There is no room for humbug in the narration." Rishabh Suri of Hindustan Times rated the movie 3/5 stars and stated "By the time the end credits roll, you are left with a film that has substance and clearly wants to provoke thought, but could have used a little more fire to truly leave a mark." Aishani Biswas for Outlook stated "Much of the film has a grim, slightly worn texture, which helps the investigation feel rooted in an actual working system. But Gulzar occasionally seems unwilling to trust the material." Komal Nahta for Film Information stated "It is a well-made film but one with more class appeal than universal appeal. It will win more critical acclaim than box-office rewards." Reviewing for The Hindu, Anuj Kumar wrote "As for the craft, the tight first hour moves with the clinical efficiency to build an airtight case for its ideological conflict. However, the editorial pacing stumbles in the second half, making the climax feel more like an over-deliberated deposition."

Manjusha Radhakrishnan of Gulf News stated "The film's structure, told through two competing perspectives, one convinced the encounter was justice, one convinced it was murder dressed up as justice, is Daayra's smartest idea." Pranati A S of Deccan Herald observed "From the very beginning, the audience very clearly knows which side they are on, so Meghna does not really delve into what is right or wrong." Saibal Chatterjee of NDTV felt that "post-interval chase sequences" are "heightened by hyperactive camerawork". He further added, "As the first two events play out and the follow-up unfolds, the film seeks to put in perspective the vulnerability of women in public spaces and the apathy of law enforcement agencies with direct allusions to the Delhi Nirbhaya gangrape case." Sukanya Verma of Rediff.com stead that Khan had a "tougher role" and noted "Unlike Gulzar's Talvar, to which Daayra's police-procedural comes closest to in soul, Raman and Ajooni remain emotionally aloof. Whatever objective Ajooni's forced subplot concerning her dad's judiciary woes is meant to achieve only winds up as a flimsy argument between its leads." Devesh Sharma of Filmfare concluded his review as "It is a hard-hitting, earthy crime drama that understands that the most disturbing part of a terrible crime may not be the crime itself, but what society chooses to do in its aftermath."
