= Reach for the Stars =

Reach for the Stars may refer to:

- "Reach for the Stars", a Cash Cash song for the Sega video game Sonic Colors
- "Reach for the Stars" (will.i.am song), 2012
- "Reach for the Stars" (Shirley Bassey song), 1961
- "Reach for the Stars" (Richard Harvey song), 1984
- "Reach" (S Club 7 song), commonly referred to as "Reach for the Stars"
- Reach for the Stars (CBS promo), a 1981 CBS space-themed campaign
- Reach for the Stars (Indian TV series), an Indian English-dubbed TV series
- Reach for the Stars (video game), a 1983 science fiction strategy video game
  - Reach for the Stars (video game), a 2000 sequel to the 1983 game
- Reach for the Stars (game show), a 1967 American game show
