= Bhavani Iyer =

Indian writer

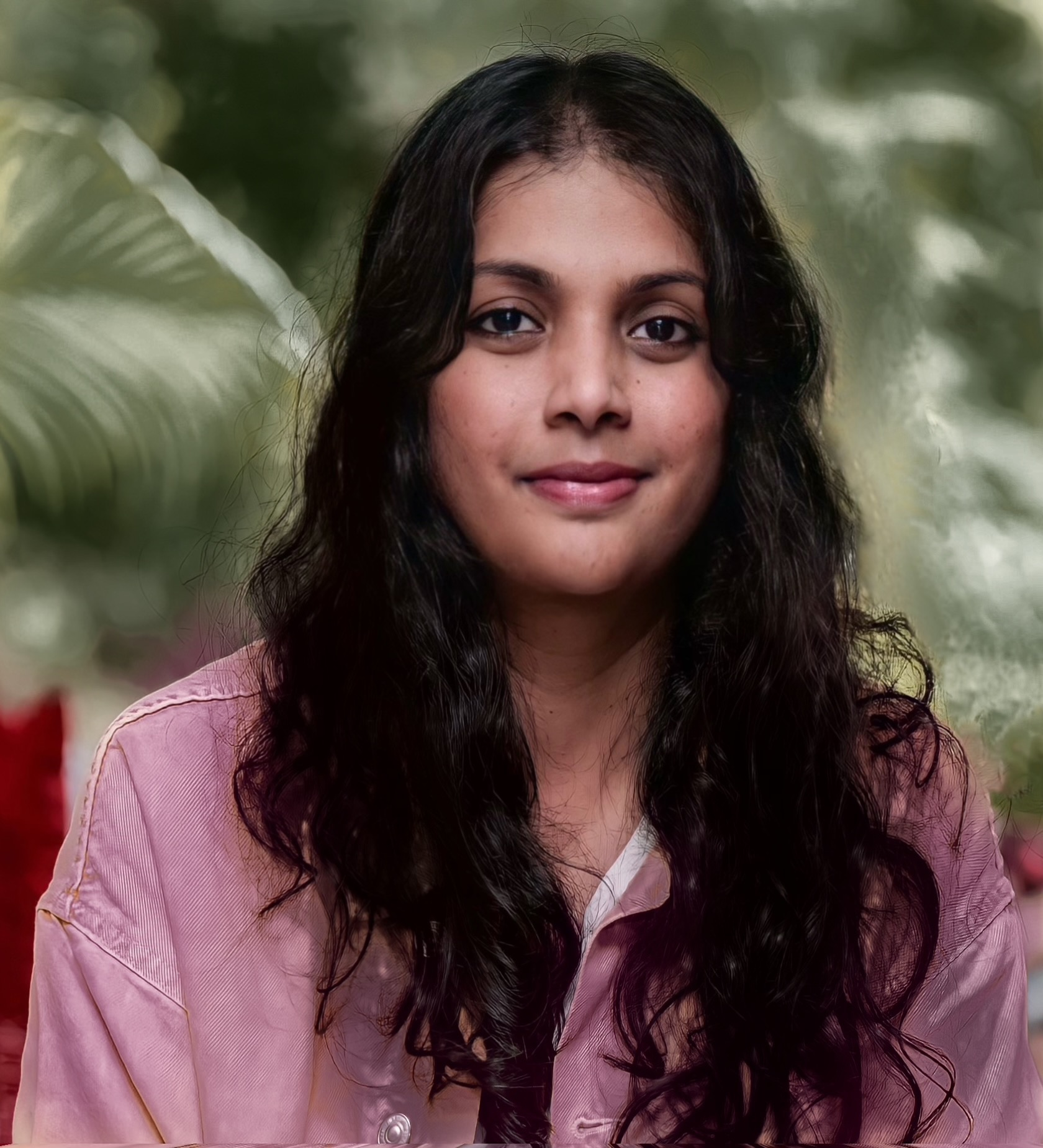
- Occupations: screenwriter, novelist

Bhavani Iyer is an Indian screenwriter and novelist from Mumbai.

== Career ==
Bhavani Iyer started her career with advertising as a trainee copywriter. She then moved to journalism and had worked as the editor for the film magazine Stardust. She made her screenwriting debut with Sanjay Leela Bhansali's Black. She has collaborated on the screenplays for Bhansali's Guzaarish, Vikramaditya Motwane's Lootera and the Indian version of Fox's hit show 24 (Indian TV series). She has also written the critically acclaimed Raazi, a spy drama that has been lauded for its sensitive depiction of cross-border espionage set during the India-Pakistan war of 1971.

Her first novel, Anon, was well received by critics and readers alike.

== Filmography ==
=== Movies ===
- Black (2005)
- Main Aisa Hi Hoon (2005)
- Swami (2007)
- Guzaarish (2010)
- Lootera (2013)
- One Night Stand (2016)
- Raazi (2018)
- Sam Bahadur (2022)

=== TV shows ===
- 24 (Indian TV series) (2013–16)
- Everest (Indian TV series) (2014)
- Meri Awaaz Hi Pehchaan Hai (2016)
- Kaafir (2019)
- Breathe: Into the Shadows (2020)
- The Empire (2021)

=== Books ===
- Anon (Fingerprint Publishing)

Anon. by Bhavani Iyer
