= Aashiqui.in =

- Theatrical release poster
- Directed by: Shankhadeep
- Written by: Shankhadeep
- Produced by: Shashikant Chheda; Amit Chheda
- Starring: Ishaan Singh Manhas; Ankita Shrivastava; Dheeraj Miglani; Tiya Gandwani; Preeti Gandwani
- Cinematography: Bharat Parthasarthy
- Edited by: Fazal Hussain
- Music by: Nitin kumar gupta; Prem Hariya
- Production company: Shethia Audio Video Productions
- Distributed by: Gipsy Films through Mirchi Movies
- Release date: 11 February 2011
- Running time: 109 minutes
- Country: India
- Language: Hindi
- Budget: INR 22,500,000

Aashiqui.in (transl. romance.in) is a 2011 Bollywood romantic film directed by Shankhadeep, starring Ankita Shrivastava and debutant Ishaan Singh Manhas in the lead roles. The music and the background score of the film are composed by Nitin Kumar Gupta and Prem Hariya, and the lyrics are penned by Gupta as well. The film is very similar to the 2004 film A Cinderella Story. The film was released in cinemas on 11 February 2011, and the story follows a man who meets his love interest on the internet.

== Plot ==
Cyrus (Ishaan Singh Manhas) is a college swimming champion who has difficulty setting his future. He aspires to become a writer, but his father (Kamal Malik) wishes him to take his swimming skills to a national level. Cyrus hides his aspirations to not disappoint his dad. Though popular in college, he feels out of place and seeks someone who can really understand him.

When a child, April (Ankita Shrivastava) lived an idyllic lifestyle with her widowed restaurant-owner father (Amit Dhamija). He remarries Mona (Sharmila Joshi), who herself has two daughters, Sania (Shubhi Ahuja) and Tanya (Preeti Gandwani). Soon after the marriage, April's father passes away, and her stepmother and stepsisters begin to treat her like a servant. Years later, and even while burdened by domestic duties, April manages to attend college and keep a part-time job to earn pocket money. Her only confidant is her childhood friend Raj (Dheeraj Miglani).

Cyrus and April meet anonymously online, becoming close without revealing their real-world identities. When they finally decide for a real-world meeting, April is able to discover Cyrus' true identity beforehand, but he does not know hers. Feeling that he is too good for her, April avoids committing to a meeting. Cyrus, feeling he has finally found the one person who would understand him as both a friend and perhaps love, seeks her everywhere.

With Raj's help, April attends the college's Christmas costume party in a masked Cinderella costume, where she recognizes Cyrus as her secret admirer, although her mask prevents him from recognizing her. Likewise, Raj manages to impress the "campus queen," Sonia (Tiya Gandwani). Unfortunately, Mona had forbidden April to attend the party, and so she is obliged to leave at midnight to prevent her stepmother from realizing she disobeyed her. In her haste, April loses one of her shoes on the staircase.

April is initially hesitant to reveal herself to Cyrus, and Sonia rejects Raj the next day when he reveals his identity to her. Sania and Tanya find the emails between April and Cyrus. After a failed attempt to trick Cyrus into believing either of them is Cinderella, they give the emails to Sonia, claiming that April intentionally made up her Cinderella persona to steal Cyrus, who was her childhood friend, from her.

As Cyrus' birthday is coming up, Sonia arranges a party at the restaurant. In order to humiliate April, she reveals April's identity to the guests and tricks Cyrus into insulting her.

Later at the restaurant, Sania and Tanya break a portrait of April's father and blame it on April. After Mona punishes her, April decides to leave her stepfamily once and for all. The other workers at the restaurant come to her defense and quit their jobs in retaliation, and she also allows April to live with them.

Before the next swimming competition, April confronts Cyrus about what had happened and forgives him. Finally emboldened, Cyrus runs after April. Sonia, seeming to repent her previous cruelty, offers her blessing to Cyrus. Reuniting at the beach, Cyrus apologizes to April and returns her slipper, proposing marriage to her.

== Cast ==
- Ishaan Singh Manhas as Cyrus
- Ankita Shrivastava as April
- Dheeraj Miglani as Raj Malhotra
- Tiya Gandwani as Sonia
- Preeti Gandwani as Tanya
- Shubhi Ahuja as Sania
- Deepan Shah as Danny
- Sharmila Joshi as Mona
- Ankitha as Riya
- Kamal Malik as Cyrus's Father
- Amit Dhamija as April's Father
- Kalpesh as Robo

== Themes ==
Inspired by the original Cinderella tale, the film involves a young woman being controlled by an overbearing step-mother and two step-sisters in a storyline which includes a hero protagonist mimicking the Cinderella Prince Charming, the two meeting at a costumed ball, the heroine rushing to leave before midnight, a glass shoe being left behind when she leaves the ball, and after the hero's search for her, he and the heroine live "happily ever after."

== Production ==
The choreographer is Pradeep Kalekar

== Release ==
Originally intended for a January 2011 release, the film was released to theaters on 11 February 2011.

== Reception ==
Rao Renuka of Daily News and Analysis offers that the film is a poor depiction of the Cinderella story. She writes that "It is unbelievable how at a time when audiences are discovering joyrides like Yeh Saali Zindagi and Dhobi Ghat, filmmaking debacles such as Aashiqui.in dare to even present themselves to viewers." She expands that the film has a poor plot, that actors seem to compete on screen for title of "worst performance", and that through its "storyline, over-the-top performances, and unsophisticated, rough editing" the film "makes a mockery of the Cinderella legend."

== Soundtrack ==
No.	Title	Lyrics	Music	Performer(s)	Length
1.	"Ruk Ke Jaana"	Nitin Kumar Gupta	Nitin Kumar Gupta	Kunal Ganjawala
2.	"Tere Bina"	Nitin Kumar Gupta	Nitin Kumar Gupta	Shaan
3.	"Ishq Bada Sangdil"	Taugique Palvi	Prem Hariya	Sukhwinder Singh
4.	"Lichu Lichu"	Taugique Palvi	Nitin Kumar Gupta	Sunidhi Chauhan and Amit Kumar
5.	"Rangon Bhari Raat"	Nitin Kumar Gupta	Nitin Kumar Gupta	Jojo and Neha Rizvi
6.	"Cinderella Se Bhi Pyari"	Nitin Kumar Gupta	Nitin Kumar Gupta	Nitin Kumar Gupta, Neha Rajpal and Croydon D'souza
7.	"Ruk Ke Jaana" (Every Time I See You Remix)	Nitin Kumar Gupta	Nitin Kumar Gupta	Nitin Kumar Gupta
8.	"Ishq Bada Sangdil" (Pure Plugins Remix)	Taugique Palvi	Prem Hariya	Sukhwinder Singh
9.	"Tere Bina" (Unplugged)	Nitin Kumar Gupta	Nitin Kumar Gupta	Shaan
10.	"Ruk Ke Jaana Reloaded!" (Remix)	Nitin Kumar Gupta	Nitin Kumar Gupta	Kunal Ganjawala
