= Ishaan Singh Manhas =

Indian television actor

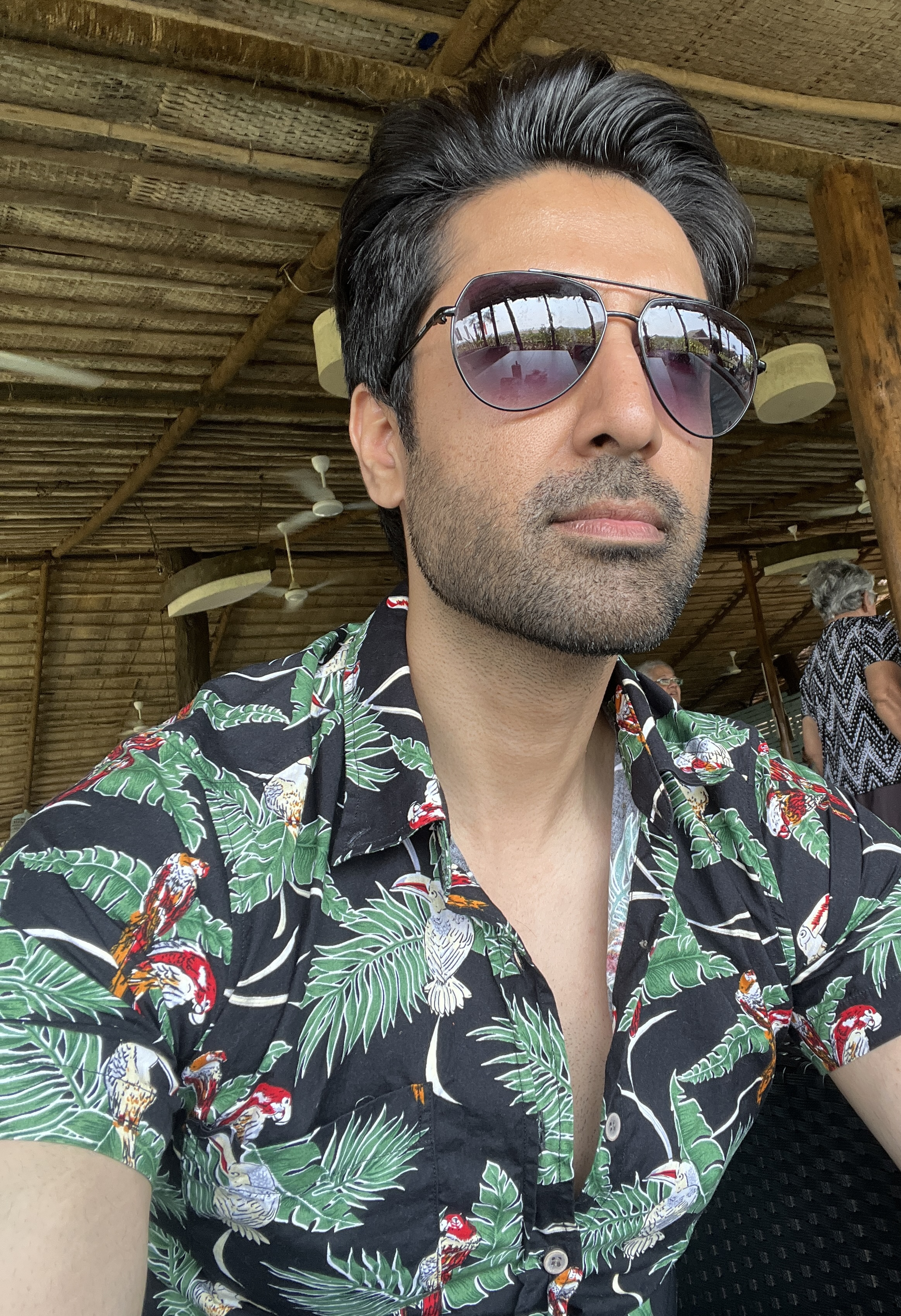
- Manhas in 2023
- Born: 18 October 1988 (age 37); New Delhi, India
- Occupation: Actor
- Years active: 2011-present

Ishaan Singh Manhas (born 18 October 1988) is an Indian television and film actor. He has appeared on TV shows like Ek Mutthi Aasmaan, Chandra Nandini, Mere Angne Mein and Ek Bhram...Sarvagun Sampanna.

Singh was born and brought up in Delhi. In 2011, he made his Bollywood debut with romantic drama Aashiqui.in directed by Shankhadeep.

== Filmography ==
=== Films ===
Year	Title	Role	Notes	Ref.
2011	Aashiqui.in	Cyrus	Debut	

== Television ==
Year	Serial	Role	Ref.
2013	Ek Mutthi Aasmaan	Samar Raizada	
2014	Hamari Sister Didi	Veer Dev	
2015	Swim Team	Jugnu Singh	
2016	Aadha Full	Arjun	
2016	Chandra Nandini	Satyajeet	
2016	MTV Splitsvilla 9	Eliminated 21st Place	
2017	Mere Angne Mein	Golu Singh	
2017	Reach for the Stars	Samar Raizada	
2018	Krishna Chali London	Prashant Jaisingh	
2019	Ek Bhram...Sarvagun Sampanna	Dhruv Mittal	
2020	Laal Ishq	Ranvijay	
2021	Sasural Genda Phool 2	Karan	
2022	Sanjog	Inspector Alok Agarwal	
2022	Swaraj	Nana Saheb Peshwa	
2023	Titli	Atharv "Cheeku" Mehta	
2024–2025	Dil Ko Tumse Pyaar Hua	Siddharth Oswal	

=== Web series ===
Year	Name	Role	Ref.
2024	Raisinghani VS Raisinghani	Aryaman Singh Kandola	
