= Raajkumar Aaryyan =

- Country of origin: India

Production
- Producers: Sunjoy Waddhwa; Comall Sunjoy Waddhwa
- Production company: Sphere Origins

Original release
- Network: NDTV Imagine
- Release: 23 January – 30 July 2008

Raajkumar Aaryyan (transl. Son of king Aaryyan) is an Indian television soap opera starring Yami Gautam. Produced by Sphere Origins and its first broadcast in January 2008, it is part of a package of shows supporting the launch of NDTV's new Imagine channel. The series became one of Imagine's top ranking programmes in terms of viewership.

== Cast ==
- Anirudh Dave as Raajkumar Aaryyan
- Avinash Mukherjee as Young Raajkumar Aaryyan
- Yami Gautam as Rajkumari Bhairvi
- Avika Gor as Young Rajkumari Bhairvi
- Manish Wadhwa as Bhootnath
- Nirmal Pandey as Senapati Bhujang
- Shahbaaz Khan as Hussain Baba
- Aditi Sajwan as Mayasheen
