= Chhoriyan Chhoron Se Kam Nahi Hoti =

- Directed by: Rajesh Amarlal Babbar
- Written by: Pravesh Rajput
- Screenplay by: Avantika Saksena
- Story by: Amit Raj Verma
- Produced by: Zee Studios; Nishant Kaushik; Shashi Kaushik
- Starring: Satish kaushik Rashmi Somvanshi; Annirudh Dave; Mohan Kant; Prakash Ghai
- Edited by: Sanjay Verma; Tarun Sunil Babbar
- Music by: Rahul Jain; Kashi - Richard; Shantanu Dutta; Aslam Keyi; Music Nasha
- Production companies: Zee Studios; The Satish Kaushik Entertainment
- Distributed by: Zee Studios
- Release date: 2019
- Country: India
- Language: Haryanvi

Chorriyan Chhoron Se Kam Nahi Hoti is a Haryanvi language film starring Satish Kaushik, Rashmi Somvanshi, Annirudh Dave, Mohan Kant, Prakash Ghai and Gautam Saugat. The story is centered around a girl's struggle to study and become an IPS Officer. Despite, getting no support from her father at home; who thinks “Girls are meant for Household chores only”; she fights all odds to prove her father wrong and goes on to join the IPS. The film won Best Feature Film in Haryanvi Language at 67th National Film Awards.

== Cast ==
- Satish Kaushik as Jaidev Choudhary
- Rashmi Somvanshi as Binita Choudhary
- Annirudh Dave as Vikas
- Mohan Kant as Baldev Singh
- Prakash Ghai as Veerdev Choudhary
- Gautam Saugat
- Kuldeep Singh as Master ji
- Sanjay Ramphal
- Jagbir Rathi
- Vishwa Deepak Trikha
