= Aniruddh Dave =

Indian television actor (born 1986)

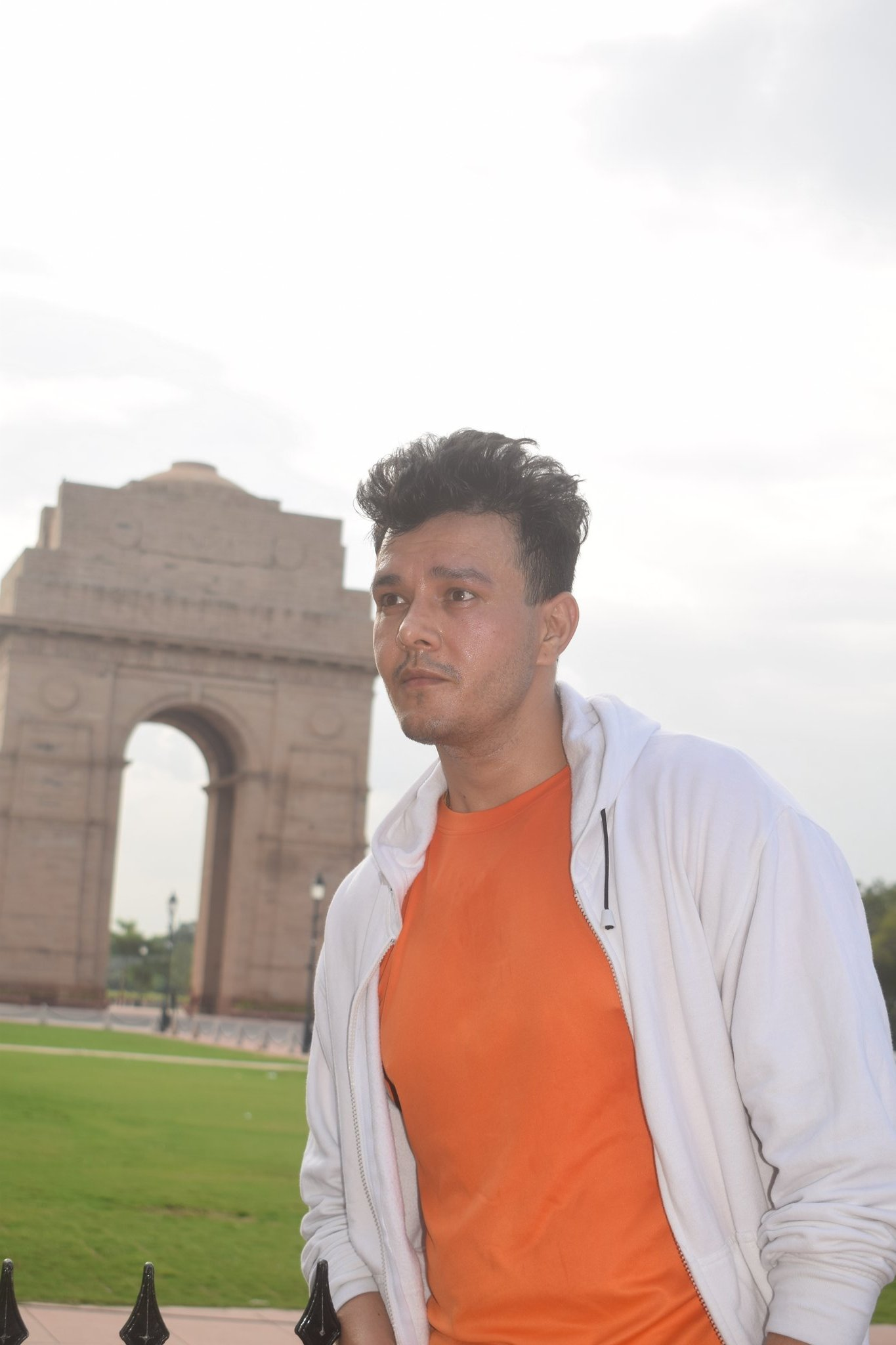
- Dave in 2022
- Born: 21 July 1986 (age 40); Dehradun, India
- Occupations: Actor; model
- Years active: 2008–present
- Spouse: Shubhi Ahuja (m. 2015)
- Children: 1

Aniruddh Dave (born 21 July 1986) is an Indian film and television actor. Some of his notable works include tv shows such as Raajkumar Aaryyan, Phulwa and films like Shorgul, Kaagaz 2 and Chandu Champion.

== Personal life ==
On 24 November 2015 Aniruddh had a love marriage with Shubhi Ahuja, an actress in Jaipur.

== Career ==
Aniruddh made his debut in Imagine TV's Raajkumar Aaryyan. Later he entered Sahara One's Woh Rehne Waali Mehlon Ki to play the role of Deven. He played Rajveer in Mera Naam Karegi Roshan and was seen in Phulwa as Lakhiya. He also did a film named Tere Sang directed by Satish Kaushik. He was also seen in show Y.A.R.O Ka Tashan as Y.A.R.O, the main lead. Aniruddh Dave acted in the Hindi film Shorgul in 2016.

== Filmography ==
=== Movies ===
Year	Title	Role	Ref.
2009	Teree Sang	Mushtaq	
2016	Shorgul	Raghu	
2019	Chhoriyan Chhoron Se Kam Nahi Hoti	Vikas	
2019	Pranaam	Arjun	
2021	Bell Bottom	Captain Sameer Mehra	
2024	Kaagaz 2	Satty	
2024	Chandu Champion	Jaggnath Petkar	
2026	Hum Hindustani	Vyomesh Mathur	

Web Shows

Year	Web Show	Character
2018	Untouchables	Nikhil
2018	Zindabad	Irfan Sayed
2019	Unafraid	Bade
2024	Tujhpe Main Fida	Sanchit
2024	Thukra Ke Mera Pyaar	Dushyant Singh

=== TV shows ===
Year	Show	Character
2008	Raajkumar Aaryyan	Raajkumar Aaryyan
2009	Woh Rehne Waali Mehlon Ki	Deven / Dev
2010	Mera Naam Karegi Roshan	Rajveer
2011	Phulwa	Lakhiyaa
2011–2012	Ruk Jana Nahi	Indu Singh
2012–2013	Aaj Ki Housewife Hai...Sab Jaanti Hai	Inspector Kanhaiya Chaturdevi
2013	Yeh Hai Aashiqui	Joe (Episode 13)
2014	Ishq Kills	Dr. Kartik (Episode 12)
2014	Bandhan	Dev Pratap Patil
2015	Yam Hain Hum	Bhaiya Ji
2015–2016	Suryaputra Karn	Shishupala
2015–2016	Janbaaz Sindbad	Zuhair / Zahid
2016	Bas Thode Se Anjane	Manav
2016–2017	Y.A.R.O Ka Tashan	Yaro the Robot
2018–2019	Patiala Babes	Inspector Hanuman Singh
2020–2021	Lockdown Ki Love Story	Raghav Jaiswal
2021	Shakti — Astitva Ke Ehsaas Ki	Shyam

== Awards and nominations ==
Year	Award	Category	For	Result
2019	Rajasthan Film Festival	Best Debut Actor (Male)	Chhoriyan Chhoron Se Kam Nahi Hoti	Won
2019	Zee Gold Awards	Best Actor Popular (Male)	Patiala Babes	Nominated
