= National Film Award for Best Feature Film Promoting National, Social and Environmental Values =

Indian film award

- National award for contributions to Indian Cinema
- Sponsored by: National Film Development Corporation of India
- Rewards: Rajat Kamal (Silver Lotus); ₹2,00,000
- First award: 2022
- Most recent winner: Captain Miller (2024)

The National Film Award for Best Feature Film Promoting National, Social and Environmental Values is one of the National Film Awards presented annually by the National Film Development Corporation of India. It is one of several awards presented for feature films.

The award was instituted at the 70th National Film Awards (for the films certified in 2022), discontinuing and combining the previous National Film Award for Best Film on Family Welfare, National Film Award for Best Film on Environment Conservation/Preservation, Nargis Dutt Award for Best Feature Film on National Integration, and National Film Award for Best Film on Other Social Issues categories.

== Winners ==
Award includes 'Silver Lotus Award' (Rajat Kamal), and cash prize. Following are the award winners over the years:

List of award films, showing the year (award ceremony), producer(s), director(s), and language(s)
Year	Film(s)	Producer(s)	Director(s)	Language(s)	Refs.
2022 (70th)	Kutch Express	Soul Sutra LLP	Viral Shah	Gujarati	
2023 (71st)	Sam Bahadur	Unilazer Ventures Private Limited	Meghna Gulzar	Hindi	
2024 (72nd)	Captain Miller	Sathya Jyothi Films	Arun Matheswaran	Tamil	
