= Malini Kapoor =

Indian television actress

- मालिनी कपूर
- Born: Malini Kapoor; 25 May 1984 (age 42); Kolkata, West Bengal, India
- Citizenship: Indian
- Education: Bombay Scottish School, Mahim; Mithibai College
- Occupation: Actress
- Years active: 2001–present
- Spouse: Ajay Sharma (m. 2014)
- Children: 1 (Kiyan Sharma)
- Relatives: Shalini Kapoor Sagar (sister); Reena Kapoor (cousin)

Malini Kapoor is an Indian television and theatre actress.

== Television ==
- Yeh Hawayein as Resham
- Jai Mahabharat as Ambalika
- Ramayan as Shrutakirti
- Ssshhhh...Koi Hai
- Sssshhh... Phir Koi Hai as Chandrika (episode – Satawan Dulha)
- Dekho Magar Pyaar Se as Yaana
- Adaalat
- Zaara (TV series) as Zeenat
- Kumkum – Ek Pyara Sa Bandhan as Malini
- Y.A.R.O Ka Tashan as Beena Agarwal
- CID (Indian TV series)
- Hari Mirchi Lal Mirchi as Rinku Khanna
- Gunwale Dulhania Le Jayenge as Ekta
- Balika Vadhu as Pushpa
- Rab Se Sohna Isshq as Beauty
- Rangrasiya as Phulwari
- Gangaa as Ginni
- Maddam Sir as Garima
- Naagin 6 as Meenakshi

== Personal life ==
Kapoor is married to actor Ajay Sharma. The couple gave birth to their son, Kiyan in December 2017.
