= Junglee (2019 film) =

2019 Indian film by Chuck Russell

- Theatrical release poster
- Directed by: Chuck Russell
- Screenplay by: Adam Prince; Raghaav Dar
- Dialogues by: Akshat Ghildhial; Suman Adhikary
- Story by: Rohan Sippy; Charudutt Acharya; Umesh Padalkar; Ritesh Shah
- Produced by: Vineet Jain; Priti Shahani
- Starring: Vidyut Jammwal; Pooja Sawant; Asha Bhat; Atul Kulkarni
- Cinematography: Mark Irwin
- Edited by: Jayesh Shikarkhane; Vasudevan Kothandath
- Music by: Songs: Sameer Uddin; Score: Sameer Uddin; Tanuj Tiku
- Production company: Junglee Pictures
- Distributed by: AA Films
- Release date: 29 March 2019
- Running time: 115 minutes
- Country: India
- Language: Hindi
- Budget: ₹20 crore
- Box office: est. ₹24.7 crore

Junglee (transl. Wild) is a 2019 Indian Hindi-language action adventure film directed by Chuck Russell in his directorial debut in Hindi cinema and produced by Junglee Pictures. It stars Vidyut Jammwal, Pooja Sawant, Asha Bhat and Atul Kulkarni. In the film, a veterinary doctor returns to his father's elephant reserve, where he encounters and clashes against an international poacher's racket. The film features martial arts and action choreography performed by Jammwal.

The initial release date was moved up a week to give a solo release to Romeo Akbar Walter. Initially scheduled for release on 19 October 2018 and then on 5 April, Junglee was released on 29 March 2019 and received praise for the cinematography and action sequences.

== Plot ==
Dipankar Nair runs an elephant sanctuary, but things have turned bad as hunters are frequently killing elephants for their tusks. Dipankar's son Raj is a veterinarian in Mumbai, who arrives for the 10th anniversary of his mother's death and visits his childhood elephant playmates Bhola and Didi. Keshav is a hunter, who has an eye on huge tusks of Bhola which could fetch good money. Keshav kills Bhola for his tusks and also Dipankar when the latter tries to save him. The cops arrive at the funeral of Dipankar and falsely implicate him and Raj of being with the hunters.

After being taken into the prison, Raj fights them all and frees himself after Didi pulls the window out with Shankara, Raj's childhood friend as her mahout with a reporter named Meera, who has arrived with Raj to write an article on the elephant sanctuary. Raj also reveals to them that the Inspector who framed him for being with hunters is a part of the group that supports elephant tusk smuggling. Raj's best friend Dev is also revealed to be with the hunters. Dev and Raj fight, after which the hunters arrive, where they injure Raj and kill Dev, who was in a bid to save Raj. The hunters also capture Shankara, while Meera captures all this in a video. Gajja Guru, who is Raj's teacher, nurses Raj with Meera.

With a dead hunter's phone, Raj learns that the buyers are in Paradeep, where Shankara is also kept. Raj attacks the factory where he kills all the bodyguards and hunters and saves Shankara. Raj attacks Keshav and wounds him, where he goes to save the others. Using this as an opportunity, Keshav picks up his gun, but Gajja Guru and Didi arrive and kill Keshav. The buyers are captured by the police while Didi delivers a baby named Asha. Three months later, Didi's child Asha is also shown to Meera's millions of followers. When Raj receives a call from his office, he replies that it will be a while before he is back at work because "Things have gotten a bit wild out here!"

== Cast ==
- Vidyut Jammwal as Dr. Raj Nair
- Pooja Sawant as Shankara, Raj's childhood friend
- Asha Bhat as Meera
- Atul Kulkarni as Keshav, a hunter
- Makarand Deshpande as Gajja Guru
- Akshay Oberoi as Dev

Uncredited

- Thalaivasal Vijay as Dipankar Nair, Raj's father
- Lars Kjeldsen as Vane

== Production ==
In September 2016, it was announced that Jammwal will star as a veterinary doctor in Rohan Sippy's film titled Junglee which will "mirror a unique friendship between man and an animal." Sippy said that the idea of the film came to him after seeing the classic 1971 Salim–Javed film Haathi Mere Saathi, though it also has some similarities with Tom-Yum-Goong. However, the film later went to American director Chuck Russell, who is known for directing The Mask (1994), Eraser (1996) and The Scorpion King (2002).

Jammwal performs an animal flow style of combat for the film. His upbringing in Kerala and his background in the Indian martial art of Kalaripayattu helped him prepare for the role. As a Kalaripayattu practitioner, he grew up interacting with animals. With his prior experience as a stuntman, Jammwal performed his own stunts for the film, which impressed Russell.

While talking about his first experience directing an Indian film, Russell said that he wanted to make a film "that is true to India, but uses the music, dance and the wonderful artists in Bollywood to tell a universal story about returning to the natural world". The principal photography of the film began on 5 December 2017 and was finished in the summer of 2018. Out of 100, four elephants were selected for the film after scouting in India and Sri Lanka. Junglee was shot in Thailand. The scenes involving elephants were shot in the presence of Thai crew members. A few scenes were also shot in the Jungles of Odisha and West Bengal.

== Soundtrack ==
Junglee

Soundtrack album by Sameer Uddin
- Released: 29 March 2019
- Recorded: 2017–18
- Genre: Feature film soundtrack
- Length: 11:15
- Language: Hindi
- Label: T-Series
External audio
- Audio Jukebox on YouTube

Sameer Uddin chronology
Mitron (2018)	Junglee (2019)

The music of the film is composed by Sameer Uddin while the lyrics are penned by Anvita Dutt Guptan and Kumar Suryavanshi.

Track listing
No.	Title	Lyrics	Singer(s)	Length
1.	"Fakeera Ghar Aaja"	Anvita Dutt	Jubin Nautiyal	3:43
2.	"Garje Gajraj Hamara"	Kumar Suryavanshi	Navraj Hans, Hamsika Iyer, Abhishek Nailwal, Gulshan Kumar	3:38
3.	"Dosti"	Kumar Suryavanshi	Mohan Kannan	3:54
Total length:				11:15

== Release ==
The film released on 29 March 2019.

=== Home media ===
The film was made available as VOD through Disney+ Hotstar on 25 May 2019.

== Reception ==
=== Critical response ===
As of October 2021, 40% of the 10 reviews compiled by Rotten Tomatoes are positive, with an average rating of 4.7/10.

Renuka Vyavahare of The Times Of India gave 3.5 out of 5 stars and wrote "Watch Junglee for its spellbinding action, cute elephants and gorgeous jungles. Such an adventurous and brave attempt is rare in Hindi cinema." Devesh Sharma of Filmfare gave 3 out of 5 stars and wrote "All-in-all, Junglee is an action-packed adventure which also tells us that we share this planet with lots of different species, who have an equal right to it..." Priyanka Sinha Jha of News18 gave 2 out of 5 stars and feels that the film is a big disappointment. Shubhra Gupta of The Indian Express gave 2 out of 5 stars and wrote "Vidyut Jammwal is a dab hand at action, and those bits are watchable. He is fluid and graceful and believable as he kicks and chops his way in and out of trouble."

Saibal Chatterjee of NDTV gave 1.5 out of 5 stars and wrote "Jammwal is about the only bright spot in a pulpy action-adventure film that is unlikely to do anything to enhance the reputation of a filmmaker who has successes like The Mask, Eraser and The Scorpion King behind him. But the lead actor will probably, and deservedly, emerge unscathed from this mess." Anupama Chopra of Film Companion gives two stars out of five with remarks, "The film's intentions are admirable and the action is carried off with conviction, but the humans have the depth of cartoon characters." Nandini Ramnath of Scroll.in writes, "The message of Junglee is deadly serious, but its solutions belong firmly in the realm of the children’s movie."

=== Box office ===
Junglee earned ₹3.35 crore on its opening day in India. Its opening weekend earnings in the domestic market were ₹13.85 crore. It earned ₹21.20 crore in its opening week in India. It earned ₹24.70 crore in the domestic market.
