= Shorgul =

2016 Indian film directed by Pranav Singh

- Poster
- Directed by: Pranav Singh (P.Singh)
- Written by: Khalid Azmi; Raj Verma
- Screenplay by: Khalid Azmi; Raj Verma
- Produced by: Swatantra Vijay Singh; Vyas Verma
- Starring: Jimmy Sheirgill; Ashutosh Rana; Suha Gezen; Sanjay Suri; Narendra Jha; Eijaz Khan
- Music by: Lalit Pandit, Niladri Kumar
- Production company: 24 FPS Films
- Distributed by: 24 FPS Films
- Release date: 1 July 2016
- Running time: 132 minutes
- Country: India
- Language: Hindi

Shorgul (transl. Uproar) is a 2016 Indian Hindi-language political thriller film, set against the backdrop of the 2013 Muzaffarnagar riots; it is directed by Pranav Kumar Singh (P. Singh) The film is produced by 24 FPS film Pvt Ltd. The film stars Jimmy Sheirgill, Suha Gezen, Ashutosh Rana, Narendra Jha, Anirudh Dave, Sanjay Suri, Hiten Tejwani and Eijaz Khan in lead roles.

The film was released on 1 July 2016. Upon release, the film received criticism and flopped.

== Plot ==
In Maliabad, a small town in Uttar Pradesh, Chaudhary (Ashutosh Rana) is a local Jat politician. He is loved and respected by everyone for fighting for their cause. On the other side, Ranjit Om (Jimmy Sheirgill) is a new-generation MLA who wants to win the upcoming election at any cost. He is joined by an orthodox Maulana, who is banging doors to collect funds for a madrassa.

Chaudhary's son Raghu (Anirudh Dave) falls in love with a Muslim girl named Zainab (Suha Gezen) in college. Both love each other although Zainab is engaged to Saleem (Hiten Tejwani), a boy from her community. After threats from Saleem, Raghu starts evading her. Zainab forcefully invites Raghu to talk to her and their situation quickly escalates. Raghu is murdered with the help of Saleem, an act that sparks communal riots.

Ranjit and Maulana use the isolated incident to create havoc for their narrow gains and the escalating situation leads to Saleem also being killed. After a political deal with Ranjit, Maulana throws Zainab out of the community. It is followed with the murder of Chaudhary by the henchmen of Ranjit, who shield Zainab till his last breath. Ranjit wins the elections after the heavy bloodshed but his bonhomie with Maulana will cost his life. Political powerplays once again lead the way, as Zainab will get her share of revenge by eliminating Ranjit.

== Cast ==
- Ashutosh Rana as Chaudhary
- Jimmy Sheirgill as Ranjit Om
- Anirudh Dave as Raghu, Chaudhary's son
- Suha Gezen as Zainab
- Narendra Jha as Alim Khan
- Shashie Verma as Shiva
- Hiten Tejwani as Saleem
- Sanjay Suri as Mithilesh Yadav
- Neetu Pandey as Savitri
- Eijaz Khan as Mustaqeem
- Hrishitaa Bhatt
- Jay Shanker Pandey as Anwar
- Mahesh Chandra Deva as Om's man
- Ahmad Khan in double role as minister and common man

== Production ==
The shooting of the film started on 16 May 2015. Many scenes were shot in Lucknow.

The film has been slated to release on 24 June 2016. The scenes of Godhra and cow references have been muted in Shorgul by CBFC. Shorgul got U/A certificate from the censor Board. A scene of the film was leaked online before the release in which actor Narendra Jha is giving hate speech similar to that of Hyderabad MIM Leader Akbaruddin Owaisi's December 2012 Adilabad Speech. Former IT Minister Kapil Sibal has penned down the Lyrics of the songs "Tere bina" and "Mast hawa" for this film. Hrishitaa Bhatt has done a special song Mast Hawa in the film.

== Soundtrack ==
The soundtrack for Shorgul was released on 13 June 2016 under the Zee Music Company label. While the majority of the album was composed by Lalit Pandit, Sitar and Zitar maestro Niladri Kumar served as a guest composer for the lead single, "Tere Bina." The lyrics for the album were penned by Kapil Sibal, Sameer Anjaan, and Alok Rajan Jha.

The track "Tere Bina" marks the debut of Niladri Kumar as a film music composer. Written by Kapil Sibal, the song features vocals by Arijit Singh and Jonita Gandhi.

A notable feature of this track is the participation of the Awaaz Children's Choir, a group of underprivileged girls discovered for their musical talent. The group underwent 30 days of professional vocal training before recording the chorus elements for the song.

Shorgul

Soundtrack album by Niladri Kumar, Lalit Pandit.
- Released: 13 June 2016
- Recorded: 2016
- Genre: Feature film soundtrack
- Length: 15:49
- Language: Hindi
- Label: Zee Music Company

Track listing
No.	Title	Lyrics	Music	Singer(s)	Length
1.	"Tere Bina"	Kapil Sibal	Niladri Kumar	Arijit Singh, Jonita Gandhi, Awaaz Children's Choir	3:43
2.	"Shaam O Seher"	Sameer Anjaan	Lalit Pandit	Vishal Mishra	4:16
3.	"Mast Hawa"	Kapil Sibal	Lalit Pandit	Pratibha Baghel	3:23
4.	"Baroodi Hawa"	Alok Rajan Jha	Lalit Pandit	Aishwarya Nigam	4:36
Total length:					15:49

== Release controversy ==
The scenes of Godhra and cow references have been muted in Shorgul by CBFC. Shorgul got U/A certificate from the censor Board. A PIL was filed by a VHP Leader in Allahabad High Court bench in Lucknow demanding to ban the release the film as many characters in the film are inspired from real politicians like character Ranjeet Om played by Jimmi Shergil in the movie is inspired by Sangeet Singh Som, Sanjay Suri's role of Mithilesh Yadav is based on Akhilesh Yadav, Narendra Jha's portrayal of Alim Khan is based on Azam Khan. CBFC snipped the words Godhra and Gau Ganga from the film. High Court rejected the PIL.

Another PIL for copyright violation was filed by Chandigarh-based author Vijay Soudai against the makers of the film. The makers claimed that Shorgul has been banned in Muzaffarnagar. A fatwa was issued by Khamman Peer Baba Committee against Jimmy Shergill and the makers. Sangeet Singh Som demanded a ban on the film.

== Critical reception ==
Nandini Ramnath of Scroll.in praised the individual performance in Shorgul. Mohar Basu of Times of India gave the film 2 out of 5 stars. Nabilah Hussain of Rediff.com gave the film 2 stars and stated that it failed to become a great film. Mid- Day gave the film 2 stars.
