= Shubhi Ahuja =

Indian television actress

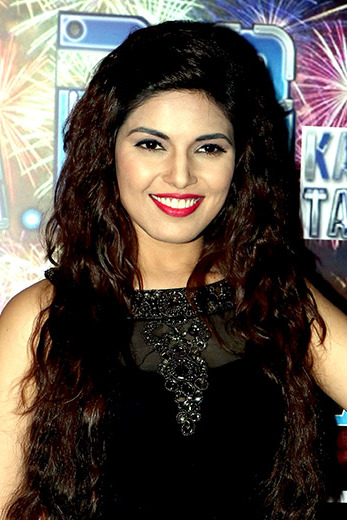
- Ahuja in 2017
- Born: Kota, Rajasthan, India
- Occupation: Actress
- Years active: 2008–2019
- Spouse: Aniruddh Dave (m. 2015)
- Children: 1

Shubhi Ahuja Dave is an Indian television and film actress, known for her roles as Sanju in Y.A.R.O Ka Tashan and Manisha in Badii Devrani (2015).

== Career ==
In 2011, she made her big-screen debut with Bollywood romantic drama Aashiqui.in directed by Shankhadeep.

== Personal life ==
On 24 November 2015, Shubhi married Aniruddh Dave, an Indian television actor. The couple have a son. They have worked together in Zee TV's Bandhan (2014) and Sony SAB's Y.A.R.O Ka Tashan (2017).

== Filmography ==
Year	Film	Character	Note
2011	Aashiqui.in	Sania	Debut

Television
Year	Show	Channel	Character
2008	Mohe Rang De	Colors TV	Lovely
2011	Detective Wagle	DD National	Simran
2015	Suryaputra Karn	Sony TV	Bhanumati
2015	Badii Devrani	&TV	Manisha
2015	Bandhan	Zee TV	Payal
2017	Y.A.R.O Ka Tashan	Sony SAB	Sanjana (Sanju)
2017	Diwane Anjane	Big Magic	Sheela
2017	Har Shaakh Pe Ullu Baithaa Hai	Star Plus	Cameo

OTT
Year	Show	OTT Platform	Character
2018	Twisted 2	Vikram Bhatt / Jio Cinema	Cameo
2019	Faceless	Vikram Bhatt / Jio Cinema	Sharbani Thakral

== Album ==
Punjabi Album
Year	Album	Singer
2019	66 Da Flat	SukhyMaan
