= Neeraj Kabi =

Indian actor and theatre director

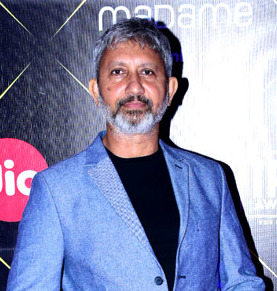
- Kabi in 2018
- Born: 12 March 1968 (age 58); Jamshedpur, Bihar, India (Present day Jamshedpur, Jharkhand, India
- Occupations: Actor; theatre artist; theatre director
- Years active: 1996–present

Neeraj Kabi is an Indian film and theatre actor, theatre director, and acting coach known for his works in International films and Hindi cinema, theatre, and television.

== Early life ==
Neeraj Kabi was born on 12 March 1968 in Jamshedpur, Bihar, now in Jharkhand. He did his schooling from Loyola School, Jamshedpur. Later, he did a diploma in computer science from Symbiosis College, Pune.

== Personal life ==
Neeraj Kabi was born to Tushar Kabi, an Odia, and his wife Zarin Kabi. He has a brother, Partha Kabi and a sister Radhika Virdi. He is married to fashion designer Deepali Kosta, and the couple has a daughter, Shatakshi Kabi.

== Career ==
Neeraj Kabi is a self-taught actor, director, trainer who is working towards building a Theatre and Film Residency involved in performance, directing, training and research. The techniques he uses are his own discoveries and experiments that he has been working on for many years to evolve his skill of acting in films and theatre.

Since the last two decades, he has been working as a professional actor with renowned national and international theatre and film directors. As a theatre director, he's been exploring the concept of collaborating Indian traditional artistes with urban actors to interpret Indian and Global theatre texts. Neeraj has travelled across the country since 1996 to conduct theatre and acting workshops for actors, children and other industries. As theatre and films deal with advanced levels of behavioural sciences which can be life changing, these workshops are based on the foundations of deep explorations of theatre philosophies, theatre sciences and theatre arts.

=== Theatre ===
Neeraj began work as a professional theatre actor in 1998 in Mumbai. He has performed in major or lead roles in plays by Shakespeare (as Banquo), Tom Stoppard (as Hamlet), Molière (as Sganarelle), Marivaux (as Harlequin), Chekov (as Gurov & Chekov), Oscar Wilde (as King Herod), Ibsen (as Tesman), Margurite Duras (as Peter Morgan), Florian Zeller (as Pierre) amongst others and has worked with International and Indian directors such as Jean Jacques Bellot and Eric Vigner from France, Gil Alon from Israel, Rene Migliaccio from USA and with Atul Kumar, Rehaan Engineer and Naseeruddin Shah from India.

His theatre production of Shakespeare's 'Hamlet' which he directed and produced in 2006 with support from the British Council Division of Mumbai, was performed at The Nehru National Theatre Festival in Mumbai, the National School of Drama's Bharat Rang Mahotsav and opened at the Kala Ghoda Festival in Mumbai, the same year. The production involved actors from Mumbai and original artistes from Indian traditions of Dhrupad singing and Yakshagana dance-drama.

=== Cinema ===
Neeraj's work in cinema began in 1997 with the Odia film Shesha Drushti a.k.a. The Last Vision, a feature film directed by Mr. A.K. Bir and produced by the NFDC which won a national award in 1998 and made it to the competition section of Cairo and Singapore International Film Festivals. Thereafter, he performed in the lead role as an Indian monk in Anand Gandhi's hugely acclaimed international award-winning feature film, "Ship of Theseus". (BEST ACTOR - Jury Special Mention at the 4th Jagran Film Festival, 2013) (BEST ACTOR at the 4th Sakhalin International Film Festival, Russia).

He played various distinctive roles, from performing as Mahatma Gandhi in Shyam Benegal's television series, 'Samvidhaan', to a Villain in Dibakar Banerjee's "Detective Byomkesh Bakshy" (Yash Raj Films) and the role of a convicted father in "Talvar", based on a true life story directed by Meghna Gulzar and produced by Vishal Bharadwaj. (Nominations for ACTING at Sony Guild Awards, Zee Cine Awards, Stardust Awards in 2016) (Newsmakers Achievers' Award for BEST ACTOR).

He's also been a part of multiple web-series projects for Netflix, Amazon and others. He performed as DCP Parulkar in a Netflix Original, 'Sacred Games'. (BEST ACTOR in a Supporting Role at the Indian Television Academy Awards in 2019) (Nomination at the Asian Academy Creative Awards in Singapore). He also won BEST ACTOR in a Supporting Role at the Indywood Academy Awards in Hyderabad for his performance in the feature film, 'Hichki' (Yash Raj Film Productions). His latest Lead Role performance as a Romantic Actor in an Indo-German Feature film called "Once Again" was honoured by the Times Now 2019 edition of Power Brands: Bollywood Film Journalist's Award with the title of "Editor's Choice BEST ACTOR".

Neeraj's latest feature film "Raahgir" directed by the legendary Goutam Ghosh premiered at the Busan International Film festival in October 2019.

He has also been a parr of acclaimed web-series such as Paatal Lok and Avrodh and Sacred Games.

In an interview, he shared the story of his struggling days in the film industry, he said, “Just nothing worked. Nobody called me. It went on and on, endlessly, relentlessly... I've [taken up jobs such as] production work, AD, spot boy, all kinds of things. I was the junior copywriter in certain ad agencies. I used to sell books from door to door for many, many years. I gave tuitions, home to home, all over the city. All kinds of tuitions: elocution, speech, mathematics, English. And that's where I learned a very important thing in my life: humility. My ego got crushed because I was pulped to the ground by everything that was happening to me. You never [imagine] that doors would be slammed on your face, you will be abused, you will be pushed, you will be kicked, so many things will happen to you. And, not for one year, two years, but for ten, 15, 18 long years. That's where the survival issue came in, and I started to teach [acting]. Because when you get so abused all the time, you lose faith in yourself. And, you think, ‘If you don't get out now, you'll fall sick.’ Because you can't take it every single day of your life.”

Neeraj Kabi essays pivotal role in “Sherni”, directed by the award-winning filmmaker Amit Masurkar.

== Accolades ==
=== Awards ===
- Best Actor at the 4th Sakhalin International Film Festival, Russia, in the International competition section in 2014 for his performance in Ship of Theseus
- Best Actor [Jury Special Mention] for his performance in the internationally acclaimed and celebrated film Ship of Theseus in recognition of Cinematic Excellence at the 4th Jagran Film Festival, 2013
- In May 2015, the NBC honoured Neeraj Kabi with the Newsmakers Achievers' Award for Best Actor for his silent and steady contribution to Indian theatre and cinema.
- Best Actor in a supporting role at the ITA awards for Sacred Games in 2019
- Best Actor in a supporting role at the Indywood Academy awards 2019 for Hichki
- Best Actor (Editor's Choice) at the Times Now 2019 Edition of Power Brands: Bollywood Film Journalist's awards for Once Again

=== Nominations ===
- Nominated for Best Actor in a negative role for Detective Byomkesh Bakshy! at the IBNLive Movie Awards 2016
- Nominated for Best Actor in a negative role for Detective Byomkesh Bakshy! at the Zee Cine Awards 2016
- Nominated for Best Actor in a negative role (Readers Choice) for Detective Byomkesh Bakshy! at the Stardust Awards 2016
- Nominated for most promising newcomer (Male) for Ship of Theseus at the 20th Annual Screen Awards 2015
- Nominated for Best Actor in a supporting role for Talvar at the 11th Sony Guild Awards 2015
- Nominated for Best Actor in a supporting role for Sacred Games at the Asian Academy Creative Awards 2019 in Singapore

== Filmography ==
=== Film ===
| Year | Film | Role | Language | Notes |
|---|---|---|---|---|
| 1997 | The Last Vision (Shesha Drushti) | Sangram | Oriya | |
| 2012 | Ship of Theseus | Maitreya | English, Hindi | |
| 2013 | Monsoon Shootout | Inspector Khan | Hindi | |
| 2014 | Gandhi of the Month | Mr. Giri | English, Hindi | |
| 2015 | Detective Byomkesh Bakshy! | Dr. Guha / Yang Guang | Hindi | |
| 2015 | Talvar | Dr. Tandon | Hindi | |
| 2015 | 35 mm | Guru | Hindi | Short film |
| 2017 | Viceroy's House | Mahatma Gandhi | English | |
| 2017 | Gali Guliyan | Liakat | Hindi | |
| 2017 | The Hungry | Arun Kumar | English, Hindi | |
| 2018 | Hichki | Prof Wadia | Hindi, English | |
| 2018 | Once Again | Amar | Hindi | |
| 2019 | Raahgir - The Wayfarers | Chopat Lal | Hindi | |
| 2019 | Laal Kaptaan | Sadullah Khan | Hindi | |
| 2019 | Line of Descent | Siddharth Sinha | Hindi | ZEE5 release |
| 2020 | Freedom | | Hindi | Netflix original |
| 2021 | Sherni | Nangia | Hindi | Amazon Prime Video release |
| 2022 | Sherdil: The Pilibhit Saga | | Hindi | |
| 2022 | Sita Ramam | Pakistani Lawyer | Telugu | |
| 2023 | Neeyat | Sanjay Suri | Hindi | |
| 2023 | Sam Bahadur | Jawahar Lal Nehru | Hindi | |

=== Television ===
| Year | Show | Role | Language | Network | Awards & Nominations |
|---|---|---|---|---|---|
| 2014 | Samvidhaan | Mahatma Gandhi | Hindi | Rajya Sabha TV | |
| 2018-19 | Sacred Games | DCP Parulkar | Hindi | Netflix | |
| 2019 | The Final Call | V. Krishnamurthy | English, Hindi | ZEE5 | |
| 2019 | Taj Mahal 1989 | Akhtar Baig | Hindi | Netflix | |
| 2019 | The Bear | Khader Khan | English / Hindi | Apple TV | |
| 2020 | Paatal Lok | Sanjeev Mehra | English, Hindi | Amazon Prime Video | |
| 2020 | Avrodh | Shailesh Malviya | English, Hindi | SonyLIV | |
| 2023 | Star Wars: Visions: The Bandits of Golak | Inquisitor (voice) | English | Disney+ | |
| 2025 | Do You Wanna Partner | Vikram Walia | Hindi | Prime Video | |
| 2026 | Sankalp | Waqar | Hindi | MX Player | |

=== Theatre ===
| Year | Play | Writer | Role | Language | Director/Producer |
|---|---|---|---|---|---|
| 1998 | Macbeth | William Shakespeare | Banquo, English Doctor | English | Salim Ghouse - Phoenix Players |
| 2000 | Rosencrantz and Guildenstern are Dead | Tom Stoppard | Hamlet | English | The Company Theatre |
| 2000 | Love is the best remedy | Molière | Sganarelle | English | Jean Jacques Bellot (from France) |
| 2001 | The game of love and chance | Marivaux | Harlequin | English | Rene Migliaccio (from USA) |
| 2003 | Lady with Lapdog (play adaptation) | Anton Chekov | Gurov and Chekov | English | Atul Kumar (The Company Theatre) |
| 2004 | Salome | Oscar Wilde | King Herod | English | Gil Alon (from Israel) |
| 2004 | Aham | Experimental work by 13 young workshop actors | - | English, Hindi | Neeraj Kabi |
| 2005 | Hamlet | William Shakespeare and Harivansh Rai Bachchan | - | English, Hindi | Neeraj Kabi |
| 2010 | Hedda Gabler | Henrik Ibsen | Tesman | English | Rehaan Engineer / The Company Theatre |
| 2013 | Gates to India song | Marguerite Duras | Peter Morgan | English | Eric Vigner (from France) |
| 2017 | The Father | Florian Zeller | Pierre | English | Naseeruddin Shah / Motley |
