= Meghna Gulzar =

Indian filmmaker (born 1973)

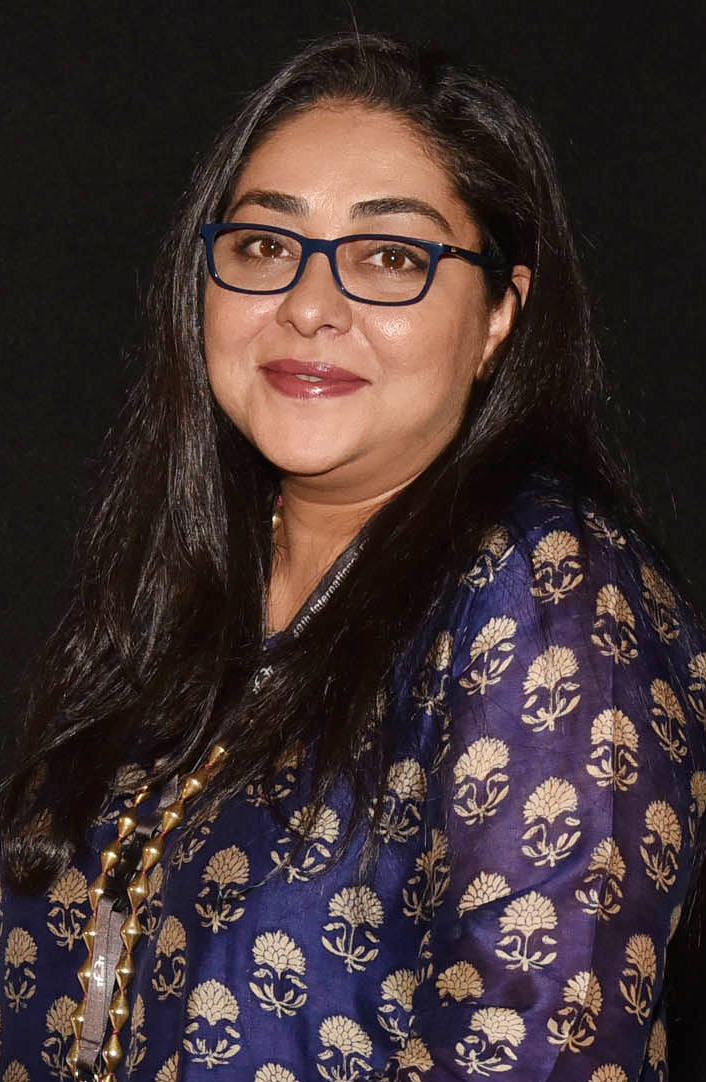
- Meghna in 2018
- Born: 13 December 1973 (age 52); Mumbai, Maharashtra, India
- Occupations: Writer, film director, producer
- Years active: 2002–present
- Spouse: Govind Sandhu
- Children: 1
- Parent(s): Gulzar (father); Raakhee (mother)

Meghna Gulzar is an Indian writer, director and producer. She is best known for directing critically acclaimed films; Talvar (2015) and Raazi (2018). Born to Gulzar and actress Raakhee, Gulzar joined her father as an assistant to his films and became a screenwriter for her father's 1999 directorial Hu Tu Tu. Meghna later became an independent director and directed her first film, the drama Filhaal... (2002), though she did not achieve directorial success that decade.

Following an eight-year sabbatical, she directed the critically acclaimed Talvar (2015), which earned her a nomination for the Filmfare Award for Best Director, which was moderate success at the box office.

Her first profitable directorial venture came in 2018, when she directed the spy thriller Raazi, which emerged as one of the highest-grossing Indian films. She won the Filmfare Award for Best Director for Raazi. She next helmed the biographical drama Chhapaak (2020) met with mixed reviews from critics. She next directed the biographical drama Sam Bahadur (2023) for which she earned the National Film Award for Best Feature Film Promoting National, Social and Environmental Values.

== Early life and education ==
The daughter of lyricist and poet Gulzar and former actress Raakhee, Meghna Gulzar was born on 13 December 1973 in Mumbai, Maharashtra. She was named Meghna by her mother, after the river Meghna which flows through her ancestral village.

== Career ==
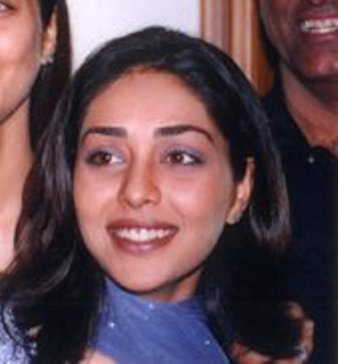
Meghna in January 2002

Meghna began her writing career as a freelance writer for The Times of India and the NFDC publication Cinema in India. Her poetry was published in anthologies of the Poetry Society of India. After completing her graduation in Sociology, she worked with noted filmmaker Saeed Akhtar Mirza as an assistant director. In 1995, she completed a short course in filmmaking from the Tisch School of Arts, New York University, New York. Upon her return, she joined her father, writer-director Gulzar, as an assistant on his films Maachis and Hu Tu Tu. Meghna simultaneously began scripting her own film along with directing documentaries for Doordarshan and music videos for several music albums.

Meghna directed her first film, Filhaal, in 2002, starring former Miss Universe-turned-actress Sushmita Sen and Tabu. Her second directorial venture was Just Married in 2007. She also directed a short film Pooranmasi for Sanjay Gupta's anthology Dus Kahaniyaan, starring Amrita Singh.

In 2015, Meghna directed the drama thriller Talvar, written by Vishal Bharadwaj and based on the 2008 Noida double murder case. The film starred Irrfan Khan, Konkona Sen Sharma and Neeraj Kabi in lead roles. It received high critical acclaim upon release, and earned Gulzar her first nomination for the Filmfare Award for Best Director.

In 2018, she directed the spy thriller Raazi. Produced by Junglee Pictures and Dharma Productions, it starred Alia Bhatt and Vicky Kaushal. The film is based on Harinder Sikka's novel Calling Sehmat. With worldwide earnings of ₹193 crore (US$20 million), it proved one of the highest-grossing Bollywood films. Raazi won the Filmfare Award for Best Film and earned Gulzar the Filmfare Award for Best Director for her work.

For her next directorial concept, Meghna chose to make a biopic on the life of acid attack survivor Laxmi Agarwal, which she named Chhapaak, (2020) that is about Malti, an acid attack survivor inspired by Agarwal. The film featured Deepika Padukone as Malti and was critically acclaimed upon its release on 10 January 2020.

She next helmed the life of military officer Sam Manekshaw in a biographical film that will star Kaushal as Manekshaw and is produced by Ronnie Screwvala. The film titled Sam Bahadur (2023), featuring Vicky Kaushal in the title role was released in December 2023. She is now set to direct Daayra, starring Kareena Kapoor Khan and Prithviraj Sukumaran.

== Controversy ==
Author Harinder Sikka has accused Meghna of cheating and ghosting him after she adapted his book Calling Sehmat into the 2018 film Raazi. According to Sikka, after securing the rights to his book, Meghna made significant changes to the story, particularly the ending, and took a pro-Pakistan stance in the film without his approval. He said that she didn't allow him to see the director's cut of the film, stopped speaking to him after filming finished, and removed him from all film-related media promotions and credits. He also accused her father, Gulzar, of calling Penguin Books publishers and pushing them to delay the launch of Sikka's book by two months so that "Meghna received all the attention", as well as pressuring the Jaipur Literature Festival to remove Sikka as a speaker.

In 2026, Sikka retrospectively called his decision to appoint Meghna as "his gravest misjudgement", and that "her ideological bias diminished the true spirit of the protagonist".

== Filmography ==
Year	Title	Director	Screenplay	Notes
1999	Hu Tu Tu	No	Yes	
2002	Filhaal	Yes	No	Story only
2007	Just Married	Yes	Yes	Story also
2007	Dus Kahaniyaan	Yes	No	Segment: Puranmaashi
2015	Talvar	Yes	No	Nominated—Filmfare Award for Best Director
2018	Raazi	Yes	Yes	Won Filmfare Award for Best Director; Nominated—Filmfare Critics Award for Best Film; Nominated—Filmfare Award for Best Screenplay
2020	Chhapaak	Yes	Yes	
2023	Sam Bahadur	Yes	Yes	Won National Film Award for Best Feature Film Promoting National, Social and Environmental Values
2026	Daayra	Yes	Yes	Also editor
