= Y.A.R.O. Ka Tashan =

Indian sitcom series

- Genre: Comedy; Drama; Science fiction
- Created by: Vipul D. Shah; Amit Aryan
- Written by: Vipul D. Shah; Amit Aryan
- Directed by: Dheeraj Kumar
- Creative director: Shashank Srivastava
- Starring: See below
- Theme music composer: Yashraj-Ajay
- Opening theme: Yaro Ka Tashan Hai
- Country of origin: India
- Original language: Hindi
- No. of seasons: 2
- No. of episodes: 216

Production
- Production locations: Mumbai, India
- Camera setup: Multi-camera
- Running time: 19 minutes
- Production companies: Optimystix Entertainment; Creative Eye Limited

Original release
- Network: Sony SAB
- Release: 26 July 2016 – 22 May 2017

Y.A.R.O. Ka Tashan (transl. Friend's style) is an Indian comedy and drama television series that aired from 26 July 2016 on SAB TV. It starred Aniruddh Dave, Rakesh Bedi, Malini Kapoor and Mahira Sharma.

== Plot ==
The story of the series is about Professor Govardhan Agrawal (Rakesh Bedi) and his wife Beena Agrawal (Malini Kapoor) who consider Y.A.R.O. (Young Assembled Robotic Object) as their own son and programmed him to behave like a 6-year-old human but later 15 and 21 year old human. In the first episode, Professor Govardhan Agrawal is happily married to Beena. However, the couple does not have a child despite many years of marriage. Professor Agrawal creates a humanoid and names it Y.A.R.O. Professor and his wife treat Y.A.R.O. as their own son and show love and affection to him. Three goons plan to kidnap Mr. Raju’s son. Y.A.R.O. comes to the rescue of the child and saves him from the kidnappers. On the other hand, Amar and Prem come to the office of Cool Advertising. Yaro makes a call to the police and informs them that a child has been kidnapped from his family. Y.A.R.O. learns that Chaturvedi is getting late for his office. Yaro hits Chaturvedi’s scooter with full force which helps him reach the office in time. Dolly meets Yaro and suggests him to not cause any trouble to Chaturvedi in the future. Beena thanks Yaro for cleaning her house.

In episode 4, Y.A.R.O. welcomes his new tenants Amar, Prem and Shilpy to his house. He also extends his hand of friendship to them. However, the trio gets terrified to see Y.A.R.O.'s superhuman capabilities and avoid him. Later, Chaturvedi yells at Y.A.R.O.'s tenants for insulting him in their house. Dolly has fallen for Prem and she is trying hard to get his attention. On the other hand, Professor Govardhan Agrawal inserts a tracker in Y.A.R.O.'s body to keep an eye on his activities. Shilpy, Amar and Prem invite Y.A.R.O. to a party. They offer Y.A.R.O. a glass of juice which would ward off evil spirit from his body. Y.A.R.O. drinks the juice, which causes circuit damage in his body. Beena tells her tenants that Y.A.R.O. is a humanoid. Professor Govardhan decides to reboot the system of Y.A.R.O. He requests Amar and Prem to not allow Chaturvedi to enter his house. Then a new family enters the friends' colony. Thus Y.A.R.O. became the entertainment of people.

== Cast ==
- Anirudh Dave as Young Assembled Robotic Object aka Y.A.R.O. (Bina and Govardhan Agrawal's son, Sanjana's husband, Amar, Prem, Dolly and Shilpy's friend)
- Shubhi Ahuja as Sanjana Kapoor Agrawal (Y.A.R.O's wife)
- Rakesh Bedi as Govardhan Agrawal (Y.A.R.O's father)
- Malini Kapoor as Bina Agrawal (Y.A.R.O's mother)
- Shoma Anand as Dadi Cool (Y.A.R.O's grandmother)
- Mahira Sharma as Shilpy
- Shivam Sharma/Abhishek Sharma as Amar
- Dheeraj Gumber as Prem
- Ajay Sharma as Mr. X
- Salim Zaidi as Inspector Doobey
- Jayshree Soni as Dolly
- Umesh Bajpai as Chaturvedi Chintamani
- Manish Mishraa as Puppy sir
- Krissann Barretto as Shanaya Oberoi
- Gopi Bhalla as Goga Kapoor
- Monica Castelino as Sushmita Kapoor (Shush)
- Karan Chhabra as Ranjeet
- Ishita Ganguly as Minty
- Shakeel Abbasi as Jatin Birbal
- Jazz Sodhi as Petra
- Shefali Rana as Prem's mother
