= Reach for the Stars (Indian TV series) =

- Starring: Rachana Parulkar Asha Negi Ashish Chaudhary Shilpa Shirodkar
- Country of origin: India

Original release
- Network: Zee World
- Release: 2017 – 2017

Reach For The Stars is a Hindi dubbed television series. It originally aired on Zee TV as Ek Mutthi Aasmaan between 2013 and 2014, and is dubbed in English on Zee World in 2017. It starred Rachana Parulkar, Asha Negi, Ashish Chaudhary and Shilpa Shirodkar.

== Synopsis ==
Reach for the stars follows the story of Kalpana "Kalpi" Jadhav (Rachana Parulkar) and Raghav Singhania (Ashish Chaudhary), as their paths cross on a journey of self improvement. Kalpi is the daughter of a maid, Kamla Jadhav (Shilpa Shirodkar), and a mill worker, Vitthal Jadhav (Mohit Dagga). Her mother's dream is to become a part of the middle class so she works tirelessly. Kalpana selflessly loves her mother, but is deprived of her love and attention because Kamla is always busy looking after family members of her employers, mostly Pakhi Kapoor (Shirina Singh).

Raghav Singhania is a rich businessman whose mission is to take revenge from the Kapoors who murdered his father. Raghav has always been in debt to Kamla as she helped him escape from the Kapoors who wanted to adopt him and take away all his wealth. He becomes attracted to Kalpi's sweet, simple and caring nature and falls in love with her. Eventually, Kalpana recognizes Raghav's feelings and reciprocates. Raghav and Kalpana fall in love, and with the blessing of their parents, plan their wedding.

On the day of his wedding to Kalpi, Raghav marries Pakhi Kapoor instead. Eventually, Raghav realizes his mistake but cannot rectify it because his mother, Gauri, wants him to use his marriage to Pakhi in her plans against the Kapoors. In order to prove his love for Kalpi, he marries her by putting the sindoor on her forehead in a temple.

Paakhi hires goons to kidnap Kalpi and keep her in a remote location. Later, Raghav learns where Paakhi is hiding Kalpi and rescues her. A car chase ensues in which the car drives off a cliff and blows up. Some fishermen find Kalpi in the river and take her to a hospital; Raghav is still missing. While in the hospital, Dhiraj Diwan is depressed over his niece Suhana's (Asha Negi) death. When he hears how Kalpi's face has been burned and that she has lost her memory, he requests the doctor to perform a plastic surgery procedure to make Kalpi look like Suhana. The surgery is successful. Suhana has flashbacks of her real family, the accident and struggles to believe she is indeed Suhana Diwan.

On the day Suhana is to marry Aryan (Kunal Varma), she realizes that she is Kalpi and she marries Raghav instead.

== Cast ==
- Rachana Parulkar/Asha Negi as Kalpana/Suhana
- Ashish Chaudhary as Raghav
- Shilpa Shirodkar as Kamla
- Mohit Dagga as Vittal
- Shireena Sambyal as Pakhi
