= Calling Sehmat =

2008 novel by Harinder Sikka

- Front Cover of the book
- Author: Harinder S. Sikka
- Language: English
- Genre: Spy thriller
- Publisher: Penguin
- Publication date: 14 May 2018
- Publication place: India
- Pages: 256 pages
- ISBN: 9780143442301
- OCLC: 1028623329

Calling Sehmat is the 2008 spy thriller novel written by Harinder S. Sikka based on real events. It was Sikka's debut novel, first published by Konark Publishers in April 2008. A revised edition was subsequently published by Penguin Random House India in May 2018.

== Plot ==
The story is set in India and Pakistan in 1971 and revolves around Sehmat Khan who is born to a Kashmiri Muslim father and a Punjabi Hindu mother. Sehmat is a young college-going girl when she learns of her freedom-fighter father's impending death from cancer. As a part of his final wishes, her patriotic father convinces Sehmat to marry a Pakistani army officer, the son of his friend who is a high-ranking Pakistani army general himself. His intention is to place Sehmat as an undercover operative within their Pakistani household.

Before the actual ceremony, she is hastily provided spy training by members of the Indian intelligence organization RAW. After the wedding, Sehmat not only manages to gain the confidence of her new family and their friends but also gathers vital information that she passes on to her handlers. Eventually, she comes across plans, what appear to be, to sink a key Indian naval target using a submarine. At great risk to herself, she promptly manages to relay this information to her handlers who realise that the target in question is INS Vikrant which at that point is anchored in the Bay of Bengal as a part of India's naval strategy for the looming war.

They are able to provide an early warning to the Indian Navy which proves vital towards India's war effort. Towards the end, Sehmat is discovered but manages to escape with the help of her handlers. She ultimately returns to India, pregnant with her Pakistani husband's child. Her child goes on to grow up in India and join the Indian Army as an Officer.

== Non-fictional elements ==
According to Sikka, he stumbled upon the story during the Kargil conflict. He acquired the story from an Indian army officer who told him of how his mother, a Kashmiri Muslim, had married a Pakistani Army officer to provide India with classified information during the 1971 war. Sikka eventually managed to meet the officer's mother in Malerkotla, Punjab where she eventually provided further elements of her story. As a part of her undercover duties in Pakistan, she used to tutor General Yahya Khan's grandchildren.

It took Sikka approximately 8 years to fictionalise the story and arrange it into a cohesive narrative. He fictionalised the name of the main character in order to keep her identity hidden. During a recent interview, he said the real woman behind the character has since died. As a tribute to her, Sikka formally launched the book aboard Vikrant, which was docked at Naval dockyard in Mumbai.

The book was re-published by Penguin India in a new format in March 2018.

== Hindi version ==
A Hindi version of the book was published on 23 August 2019.

== Film adaptation ==
In 2018, the novel was adapted into a Hindi-language spy thriller with a change in the climax, titled Raazi. It stars Alia Bhatt in the role of Sehmat and Vicky Kaushal plays her husband. The film was directed by Meghna Gulzar and produced by Vineet Jain, Karan Johar, Hiroo Yash Johar and Apoorva Mehta under the banner of Dharma Productions.

== See also ==
- Indo-Pakistani War of 1971
- Indo-Pakistani wars and conflicts
