= Talvar (film) =

2015 Indian film by Meghna Gulzar

- Theatrical release poster
- Directed by: Meghna Gulzar
- Written by: Vishal Bhardwaj
- Based on: 2008 Noida double murder case
- Produced by: Vineet Jain; Vishal Bhardwaj
- Starring: Irrfan Khan; Konkona Sen Sharma; Neeraj Kabi
- Cinematography: Pankaj Kumar
- Edited by: A. Sreekar Prasad
- Music by: Score: Ketan Sodha; Songs: Vishal Bhardwaj
- Production companies: Junglee Pictures; VB Pictures
- Distributed by: AA Films
- Release dates: 14 September 2015 (TIFF); 2 October 2015 (India)
- Running time: 133 minutes
- Country: India
- Language: Hindi
- Budget: ₹15 crore
- Box office: est.₹45.9 crore

Talvar (transl. Sword), released internationally as Guilty, is a 2015 Indian Hindi-language crime thriller film directed by Meghna Gulzar and written by Vishal Bhardwaj. Produced by Bhardwaj and Vineet Jain, the film is loosely based on the 2008 Noida double murder case involving a teenage girl and her family's servant. The film stars Irrfan Khan, Konkona Sen Sharma and Neeraj Kabi, and follows the investigation of a case from three different perspectives in which her parents are either guilty or innocent of the murder charges by the police investigation, the first Central Bureau of Investigation (CBI) probe and an investigation by a different CBI team.

It was conceived by Bhardwaj after he met some of the police officials who were investigating the case. He later met Meghna, and expressed his desire to produce a film with her; they then came up with the idea of making a film about the real-life case. They researched the case for two years and found several contradictions, with each view having some validity. Bhardwaj's script was an example of the Rashomon effect. Pankaj Kumar was the film's director of photography, and A. Sreekar Prasad was its editor.

Talvar premiered at the 2015 Toronto International Film Festival in the special-presentation section, and was screened at the 2015 BFI London Film Festival and the Busan International Film Festival. It was released theatrically in India on 2 October 2015 to mostly positive reviews, with particular praise for its writing and performances; however, many of the critics felt that the film was very biased towards the parents. The film was a moderate box-office success, grossing ₹45.9 crore (US$4.8 million). Bhardwaj received the Best Adapted Screenplay Award for Talvar at the 63rd National Film Awards, and Prasad received the Award for Best Editing at the 61st Filmfare Awards.

== Plot ==
During the night of March 15–16, 2008, fourteen-year-old Shruti Tandon is found dead in her bedroom at her home in Noida by her parents, physicians Ramesh and Nutan Tandon. The local police initially suspect their missing domestic helper, Khempal, but his decomposed body is soon discovered on the building's terrace. The police question Kanhaiya, Khempal’s close friend and Ramesh's clinic assistant, who insinuates that Khempal and Shruti were in an intimate relationship. Relying on this testimony, the incompetent local police declare the double homicide an honor killing and arrest Ramesh on March 25, publicly defaming the deceased teenager in a sensationalized press conference.

The resulting public outrage over victim-blaming forces the case to be transferred to the Central Department of Investigation (CDI), led by Joint Director Ashwin Kumar and ACP Vedant. Kumar is deeply contemptuous of the local police, who completely botched the initial crime scene and destroyed critical forensic evidence. Methodically rebuilding the investigation, Kumar uncovers that Kanhaiya and two accomplices committed the murders after an attempted assault on Shruti. Through rigorous interrogation and narcoanalysis tests, Kumar secures confessions from the assistants, officially exonerates the parents, and secures Ramesh’s release from prison on June 22, 2008.

As Kumar prepares to close the case, the CDI Director retires and is replaced by a politically minded successor. Eager for a promotion, Vedant betrays Kumar by leaking tampered files to the new chief, creating a false narrative that aligns with the local police's original honor-killing theory. A physical altercation ensues between Kumar and Vedant, resulting in Kumar's suspension. The new CDI chief reassigns the case to a second investigative team led by a retired officer, Paul, who actively manipulates the evidence to frame the parents.

Both CDI teams present their conflicting hypotheses in an internal tribunal, but the new administration favors Paul's team. The CDI files a closure report in the Ghaziabad court, naming the parents as the prime suspects while admitting the evidence is insufficient for a standard prosecution. The Tandons file a protest plea against the report, demanding a reinvestigation to clear their names. However, the magistrate rejects the closure report and instead uses it as a charge sheet to formally prosecute the parents. The trial commences on June 8, 2012, and despite the lack of direct forensic evidence, the Tandons are convicted of the murders.

== Cast ==
- Irrfan Khan as Ashwin Kumar, Joint Director of CBI
- Konkona Sen Sharma as Nutan Tandon
- Neeraj Kabi as Ramesh Tandon
- Sohum Shah as Vedant Chaudhary
- Alisha Parveen Khan as Shruti Tandon
- Gajraj Rao as Inspector Dhaniram Chaurasia
- Atul Kumar as Paul
- Sumit Gulati as Kanhaiya
- Jaspal Sharma as Rajpal
- Neyha Sharma as a youngster providing a sound bite (cameo appearance)
- Prakash Belawadi as Ramshankar Pillai
- Shishir Sharma as J. K. Dixit
- Tabu as Reema Kumar, Ashwin's wife (cameo appearance)

== Production ==
=== Development ===
Filmmaker and composer Vishal Bhardwaj was impressed by director Meghna Gulzar after seeing the 2007 anthology film, Dus Kahaniyaan (in which she directed one segment), and expressed his wish to produce a film with her. Meghna said that she was "beginning to wonder what to do next" when she had the conversation with Bhardwaj, and they came up with the idea of making a film about the 2008 Noida double murder case. Bhardwaj and Meghna researched the case for nearly two years and found "several bizarre contradictions and each view had their own conviction". They decided to present three perspectives in the story: the police investigation, the first CBI probe and an investigation by a different CBI team. Bhardwaj and Meghna did not yet obtain permission from the Talwar family for the film. Meghna was fascinated by the idea of exploring the "unfinished-ness" of the case. In January 2015, it was announced that the Talwar couple (who were in prison) had approved the film. Bhardwaj, who wrote and produced the film, said that he was influenced by the Rashomon effect (in which the same event is given different interpretations by the individuals involved). According to Meghna, she tried to keep the narrative as objective as possible to let the viewer interpret it on their own.

The names of individuals and organisations were changed in the film to avoid legal issues. At a screening, lawyer and politician Ram Jethmalani, said that the trial depicted in the film was inaccurate. Meghna responded, "[The film] is more about the investigation than about the trial. In fact, the trial is not part of the film at all. It tracks the many investigations." The first draft of the screenplay was written in a year, and it took more time to convince those involved in the investigation to participate. Aarushi's aunt, Vandana Talwar (who began a campaign to prove the parents' innocence), provided some material to Bhardwaj. Some of the documents provided to Bhardwaj were firsthand accounts by Rajesh and Nupur Talwar. Earlier entitled Nyodda, the film was renamed Talvar. The title was initially registered with Pritish Nandy Communications (PNC), but was purchased by Bhardwaj. PNC was the film's initial co-producer, but the company withdrew from the project. About the film's title, Meghna said that it referred to justice: "Talvar alludes to the sword that is held in the hand of the lady of justice." She also said that the film would serve its purpose if it begins a debate about re-examining the case.

Bhardwaj was driven to write the script after an encounter with the case's first investigating officer: "There was a kind of black humour that was coming out of this tragedy. I am a great fan of Rashomon. I found the best way to write the script in it". He was troubled by the fact that people talked about Aarushi's death, but paid little attention to her parents. Meghna and Bhardwaj began researching the case in mid-2012, during the trial. Bhardwaj said that although he took "some liberties with the script", he did not meddle with the story. About the film's purpose, Meghna said that a number of people "knew something about the case, but they didn't know everything about it or remember it". She said that the film brings out the different aspects of the case. Research continued while the film was being shot because of changes on the set or in a scene. Meghna obtained the Talwars' side of the story from a meeting with Rajesh Talwar's brother and sister-in-law, Dinesh Talwar and his wife Vandana; afterwards, she said that she "did not feel the need to meet the Talwars".

=== Casting and filming ===
Alisha Parveen Khan played Shruti Tandon, a role based on Arushi Talwar. Konkona Sen Sharma was approached by Talvar's casting director, who told her about a role based on Nupur Talwar which attracted her. She said she enjoyed the script, and agreed to do the film after meeting Meghna. Sharma did not research her role (she felt that the script was "well researched"), and said that her character was about "portraying guilt and innocence according to perceptions." In November 2013, it was announced that Irrfan Khan was cast in the film. Khan did not know about the case in detail before the film. His character was based on CBI officer Arun Kumar, whom he met in preparation for the film, and he was the only actor approached to play the role. Khan agreed to do the film because he considered the story "near and frightening", and the film was not sensationalised: "It is an important case, and whatever you may think about the verdict, the film gives us a chance to look at our system and how different departments deal with a crisis." Neeraj Kabi, who played Aarushi's father (Rajesh Talwar) in the film, said: "You are making a film about people who are alive and are suffering, you have to be extremely sensitive". Tabu made a three-minute appearance in the film as Khan's wife.

Principal photography began a year later (in June 2014) on location in Mumbai, Delhi and Noida, and lasted almost a year. According to Meghna, filming was a "hugely draining" experience. The script was based on material in the public domain, and she called it her "most fragile film". Several scenes were filmed in a house identical to the Talwars', a few blocks away. Meghna said that the most difficult part for her was filming the murder scenes; although there were different weapons and different killers from different perspectives, the "one[s] to die w[ere] always the girl and the man, which did not change". Pankaj Kumar was Talvar's director of photography, and A. Sreekar Prasad edited the film.

== Soundtrack ==
The film's music was composed by Vishal Bhardwaj, with lyrics by Gulzar. The album consisted of four songs, with vocals by Arooj Aftab, Rekha Bhardwaj, Sukhwinder Singh and Arijit Singh. It was released on 16 September 2015 on the T-Series label. The score was composed by Ketan Sodha.

== Release ==
Talvar premiered under the title Guilty at 2015 Toronto International Film Festival's special presentation on 14 September 2015, and was screened at the 2015 BFI London Film Festival and the Busan International Film Festival. The film's trailer was released on 22 August 2015, followed by two posters featuring Lady Justice and Khan. The film was released on 625 screens throughout India on 2 October 2015. Paid previews were organized a day before its public release. A special screening for celebrities was presented several days after its release. Talvar, the second 2015 film based on the case (the first was Rahasya), was released on DVD on 24 November 2015 and is also available on Netflix.

== Reception ==
Talvar received a positive critical reception. On the review aggregator website Rotten Tomatoes, 91% of 22 critics' reviews are positive, with an average rating of 6.9/10.

Rajyasree Sen of Firstpost called the film a "must see whodunnit" with a "gritty documentary feel". Saibal Chatterjee of NDTV praised its writing and performances, calling it a "gripping, genre-defying and non-exploitative cinematic examination" of the murder case. Srijana Mitra Das of The Times of India wrote, " ... Talvar is super-sharp, a sword swipe at Bollywood's song-and-dance, mehendi-fuelled escapism." Rajeev Masand called the film a "gripping, then baffling, and ultimately disturbing account" of the murder, "deliberately unsentimental and melodrama-free". Sneha May Francis of Emirates 24/7 praised Sharma and Kabi, expressing that they "play the parents impressively, with restrained perfection".

Shilpa Jamkhandikar of Reuters noted that it is a "well-constructed, gripping film", but the filmmakers' bias about the case left a "bitter aftertaste". Nandini Ramnath of Scroll.in felt the film was a "slickly produced, tightly written and beautifully performed true crime documentary"; she also called Talvar a "legal petition disguised as a movie", whose sole purpose was to request the authorities to reconsider the case. Aseem Chhabra of Rediff.com observed: "very uncomfortable film to watch": "A good film should be able to get into our skin, challenge us, shake us up and Talvar does all of that." Jai Arjun Singh praising Khan's performance, said that his character's "commitment and comic timing" were rare in Hindi films.

Namrata Joshi of Outlook described its "solid writing, sharp dialogue and the spot-on performances" as the strengths. She praised its humour in the face of a serious investigation, which gave the film a "nice touch". Sarit Ray of Hindustan Times mentioned Talvar "shakes you up and forces you to think". He praised the "believable and flawed" character of Ashwini, who "drinks on the sly, out of bottles wrapped in paper bags, and distractedly plays Snakes on his phone while a parent sobs" instead of being a "punchline-spewing hero figure". Shubhra Gupta of The Indian Express thought that it was "a brave film that devastates, and despite its flaws, makes for a compelling watch."

Raja Sen wrote in his review: "A tightly-coiled procedural made with such dryness that it seems, in parts, documentarian – resembling a reenactment more than a feature film". Deepanjana Pal said that Talvar was more of a "much-needed social document than a film", and its "direction lacks imagination". Anuj Kumar of The Hindu reviewed, "Its intentions might be blunt but as a piece of cinema Talvar is a sharp procedural." Uday Bhatia of Mint praised its performances and Bhardwaj's screenplay: "A taut film on the Noida double homicide, built around an exceptional screenplay". According to Sonia Chopra of Sify, the film was a "perfect balance of sobriety and cruelly dark humour."

Among overseas reviewers, Joe Leydon of Variety labelled the screenplay "solidly constructed" and the film's narrative flow "satisfyingly brisk". J. Hurtado of Screen Anarchy wrote, "Talvar makes for gripping, infuriating, and at times illuminating viewing, and it's a film that will translate just as well to those ignorant with the case as to those intimately involved." Deborah Young of The Hollywood Reporter gave the film a positive review, naming it "gripping from start to finish." Rachel Saltz of The New York Times noted Khan's performance as the "movie's best weapon": "Playing a familiar character type, the world-weary detective, he gives a performance, full of small, sly details, that doesn't seem familiar at all."

=== Box office ===
Talvar was filmed on a budget of ₹15 crore (US$1.6 million). Released with Singh Is Bliing and Kis Kisko Pyaar Karoon, the film made ₹3 crore (US$310,000) at the box office on the opening day. and earned ₹5 million (US$52,000) from the paid preview before its theatrical release. It earned ₹2.7 crore (US$280,000) and ₹3.3 crore (US$340,000) on Saturday and Sunday, respectively, for a total of ₹9 crore (US$930,000) on its opening weekend. Talvar grossed ₹22.6 crore (US$2.3 million) during its first ten days and, by the end of its theatrical run, earned a worldwide gross of ₹45.9 crore (US$4.8 million).

== Awards ==
At the 63rd National Film Awards, Bhardwaj received the Best Adapted Screenplay Award and Sanjay Kurian the Best Audiography award. At the 61st Filmfare Awards, A. Sreekar Prasad received the Best Editing award and Shajith Koyeri the Best Sound Design award.

== See also ==
- Rashomon effect
