= Jahazpur Fort =

- जहाजपुर फोर्ट
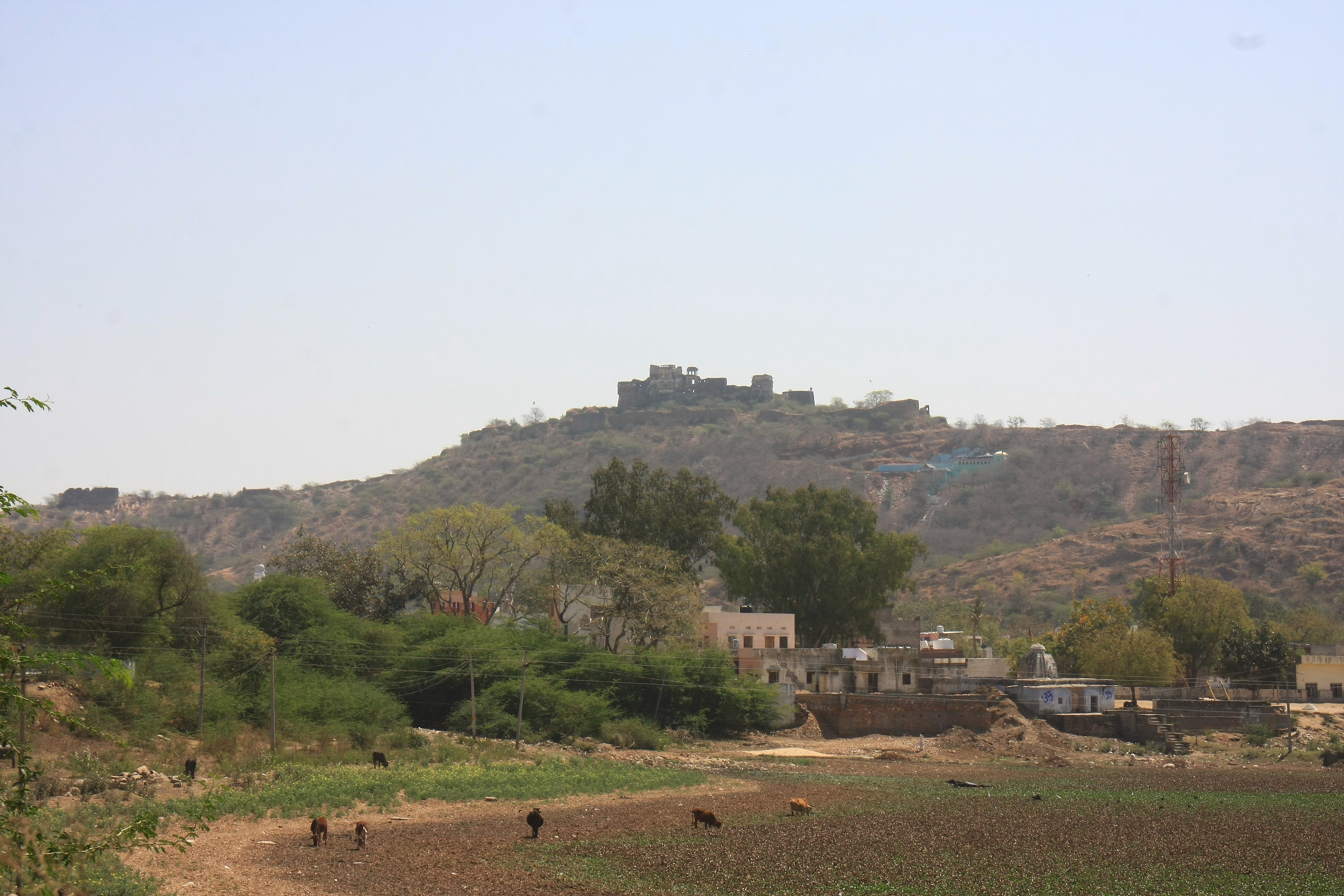
- Location: Jahazpur, Rajasthan, India
- Coordinates: 25.6135446°N 75.2793576°E
- Type: Fort

The Jahazpur Fort is a Mewar fort in the city of Jahazpur, Rajasthan, India. It was originally established by Samprati, the Jain-devotee grandson of Emperor Ashoka. In the 14th century, Rana Kumbha of Mewar significantly rebuilt and reinforced its ramparts as part of a strategic frontier‑defense network. After Maharana Udai Singh’s death, the site became a jagir for his brother Jagmal Singh who had defected to Emperor Akbar until Maratha forces forced its abandonment in the early 18th century. The East India Company assumed nominal control in 1799, and by the mid‑19th century the fort was largely deserted and fallen into ruin.

== History ==
Jahazpur Fort, perched atop a steep hill some 90 km northeast of Bhilwara, traces its origins to Samprati, the Jain‑devotee grandson of Mauryan emperor Ashoka. In the 14th century, Rana Kumbha of Mewar undertook major reconstruction, strengthening its ramparts as part of his frontier‑defense network. Following Maharana Udai Singh’s death, local nobles installed Maharana Pratap instead of his elder brother Jagmal Singh, who defected to Akbar’s service and was granted Jahazpur as a jagir until Maratha incursions in the early 18th century forced his descendants to abandon the hilltop stronghold. The East India Company took nominal control after 1799, and by the mid‑19th century the fort fell into ruin, its temples and palatial quarters largely deserted.

== Architecture ==
The Jahazpur Fort exemplifies the design principles of medieval military architecture, featuring dual defensive walls each bordered by a deep trench and punctuated with numerous bastions for repelling assaults. Although largely reduced to ruins, the surviving sections reveal the fort’s former grandeur, constructed predominantly from sandstone and adorned in places with detailed carvings and traditional jharokha balconies. Within the compound stands the revered Sarweshwar Nathji Temple, dedicated to Lord Shiva, and nearby lies a tranquil pond, offering a peaceful counterpoint to the surrounding fortifications.
