= Reth (disambiguation) =

Reth may refer to:

- Reth, a fictional city in the role-playing game setting of the Forgotten Realms
- Reth, North Brabant, a settlement in the Netherlands (51°26′N 4°57′E)
- Reth (TV series), a serial appearing on the Indian Zee TV satellite television network
- Captain Reth, fictional military figure in Second Battle of Borleias in the Star Wars Universe
- The title of the kings of the Shilluk people in southern Sudan
