= Mukesh Singh Shaktawat =

Indian politician

politics
- Incumbent
- Assumed office 2013
- Preceded by: Dhiraj Gurjar
- Constituency: Jahazpur

Personal details
- Born: 15 December 1980 (age 45) Deoli, Rajasthan
- Party: Bharatiya Janata Party
- Spouse: Vandana Singh
- Parents: Brij Raj Singh (father); Chain Kanwar (mother)
- Occupation: Politician
- Website: www.captainmukesh.in

Captain Mukesh Singh alias Mukesh Singh Shaktawat is an Indian politician from the Bharatiya Janata Party and representing the Jahazpur Vidhan Sabha constituency of Rajasthan.
