= Ajabde =

Maharani of Mewar and consort of Maharana Pratap (1542–1591)

Ajabde Punwar
- Queen consort of the Kingdom of Mewar; Queen mother of the Kingdom of Mewar; Rajkumari of Bijolia
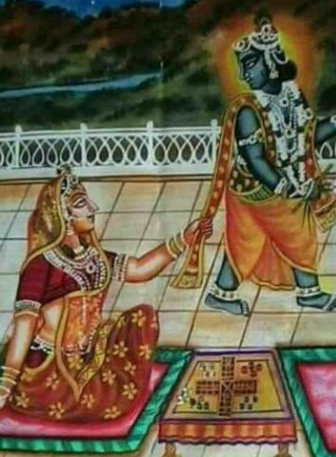
- Ajabde portrayed playing Chausar against the God Shrinathji

Maharani of Mewar
- Reign: 1572 – 1591
- Predecessor: Jaiwanta Bai Songara
- Successor: Shyam Kanwar Tomar
- Born: 1 March 1541; Bijolia, Bhilwara
- Died: 20 January 1591 (aged 50); Chavand, Mewar
- Spouse: Maharana Pratap
- Issue: Amar Singh I Bhagwan Das
Names
- Maharani Ajabde Bai Punwar
- Dynasty: Parmar (by birth); Sisodia (by marriage)
- Father: Rao Mamrakh Punwar
- Mother: Hansa Bai
- Religion: Hinduism

Ajabde Punwar (lit. 'Beautiful Soul'; c. 1 March 1542 – 20 January 1591), popularly known as Maharani Ajabde Punwar, was the queen of the Kingdom of Mewar. She was the chief consort, first and favourite wife of Maharana Pratap, and the mother of Amar Singh I. Ajabde was known for her beauty, intelligence and influence on Pratap.

== Birth and family ==
Ajabde was born on 1 March 1542 in Bijolia, Bhilwara to Rao Mamrakh Punwar, the ruler of Bijolia and his queen Hansa Bai. Ajabde belonged to the family of Parmars and her father was a fiefdom under Mewar. HS Bhati, author of Yug Purush Maharana Pratap, describes her as the granddaughter of Rao Asarwan Punwar and daughter of Mamrakh.

== Marriage and children ==
Ajabde's father Rao Mamrakh Punwar and Maharana Pratap's father Udai Singh II took the decision to get their children married. Ajabde and Pratap got married at a young age, in 1557. Pratap later had ten more marriages, as a result of political alliance. Throughout her life, Ajabde remained Pratap's favourite consort and had an impact on all his decisions.

Ajabde and Maharana Pratap had two sons. She first gave birth to Amar Singh I on 16 March 1559, who became the 14th Rana of Mewar, post his father's death. Ajabde later gave birth to her younger son, Bhagwan Das. She is also the grandmother of Karan Singh II, Amar Singh's son and the 15th Rana of Mewar.

=== Religion ===
According to the Pushtimarg literature, Ajabde accepted Pushtimarg and became a devotee of Vitthalanatha. The Pushtimarg literature of Vallabha Sampradaya, recognizes her as an epitome of devotion. It is mentioned that she used to play Chausar (a board game played with dice) very frequently. According to local traditions her winning of a game of Chausar against the deity Shrinathji led to Krishna's divine presence in Mewar.

== Maharani of Mewar ==
Greatest extent of the Kingdom of Mewar

After the death of Udai Singh in 1572, Rani Dheer Bai Bhattiyani wanted her son Jagmal to succeed him but senior courtiers preferred Pratap, as the eldest son, to be their king. The desire of the nobles prevailed and Pratap ascended the throne as the 54th ruler of Mewar in the line of the Sisodia Rajputs. He was crowned in Gogunda on the auspicious day of Holi. Alongside Pratap, Ajabde became the Maharani of Mewar, succeeding his mother, Jaiwanta Bai Songara.

Historian Chandrashekhar Sharma mentions about Pratap taking Ajabde's advice on various occasions, because of her deep knowledge about political issues. Ajabde would advise Pratap on all his administrative decision and also took important decision of the Mewar household.

=== Battle of Haldighati ===
Ajabde prominently maintained her position as the Maharani of Mewar, and managed the state affairs in the absence of Pratap during wartime. After the Battle of Haldighati, the Mughals under Akbar, captured Mewar's capital, Chittorgarh. Ajabde accompanied Pratap to the forest along with other fleeing members of the family.

== Later life and death ==
Pratap later established his capital at Chavand in 1585, and it became the new seat of the Kingdom of Mewar. He later recovered much of his ancestral kingdom, which included all 36 outpost of Mewar apart from Chittor and Mandalgarh. Ajabde died in the year 1591. The cause of her death remains unknown. But according to several historians, she died at the palace in Chavand.

== Influence and cultural depiction ==
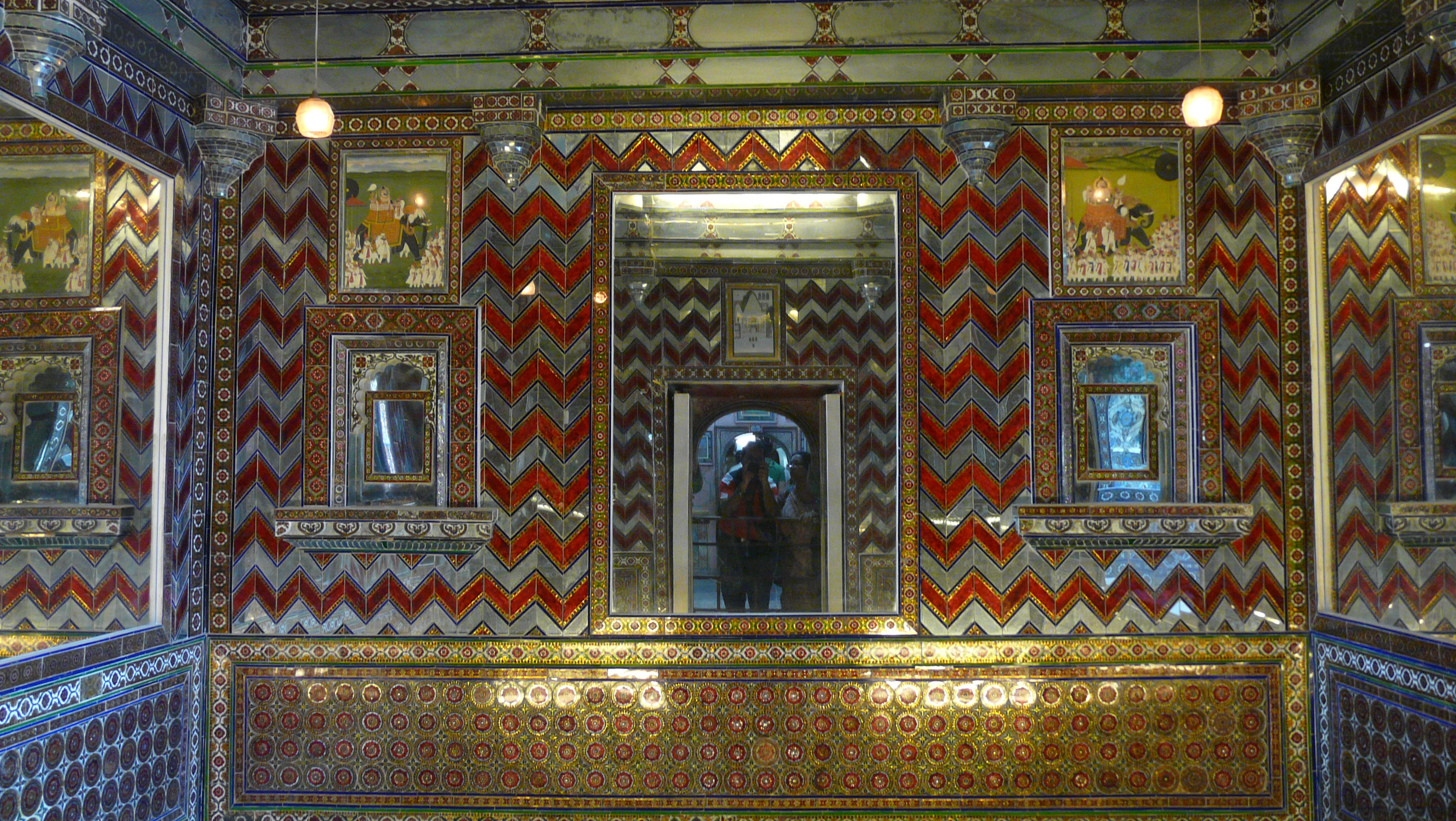
Sheesh Mahal at the City Palace

Ajabde Punwar is considered among the most influential queens of Mewar, often being compared to Rani Karnavati, Meerabai and Jaiwanta Bai. Historian James Tod in his book, Annals and Antiquities of Rajasthan mentioned about her being a "respectable figure" in the Mewar Kingdom, who had "significant impact" on Maharana Pratap's life and decisions.

Maharana Pratap built the Sheesh Mahal at the City Palace, Udaipur for Ajabde. The complex also has various paintings depicting Pratap and Ajabde's life.

== In popular culture ==
Ajabde has been portrayed in films and television adaptations of Maharana Pratap's life.

- In the 2015 series, Bharat Ka Veer Putra – Maharana Pratap, Ajabde was portrayed by Roshni Walia and Rachana Parulkar.
- In the upcoming series Maharana, Ajabde is portrayed by Ridhima Pandit.

== Sources ==
- Majumdar, R. C., ed. (1974). History and Culture of the Indian People. Vol. VII. Bombay: Bharatiya Vidya Bhavan.
- Nahar, Vijay (2011). हिंडुआ सूरज मेवाड़ रतन [Hindua Suraj Mewar Ratan] (in Hindi). Jaipur, Rajasthan: Pinkcity Publishers. ISBN 978-93-80522-45-6.
