= Jaiwanta Bai =

Maharani of Mewar and wife of Udai Singh II

- Queen consort of the Kingdom of Mewar; Queen mother of the Kingdom of Mewar; Rajkumari of Jalore
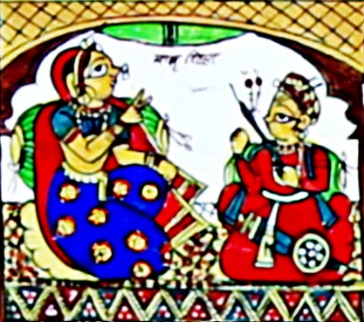

Maharani of Mewar
- Reign: 1540 – 1572
- Predecessor: Raj Dei Rathore
- Successor: Ajabde Punwar
- Born: Pali, Jalore
- Spouse: Udai Singh II
- Issue: Maharana Pratap
Names
- Maharani Jaiwanta Bai Songara
- Dynasty: Chauhan (by birth); Sisodia (by marriage)
- Father: Akheraj Chauhan Songara
- Mother: Jharna Bai
- Religion: Hinduism

Jaiwanta Bai Songara (lit. 'Long Lived'), also known as Maharani Jaiwanta Bai, was the queen of the Kingdom of Mewar. She was the chief consort and first wife of Udai Singh II, and the mother of Maharana Pratap.

== Early life ==
Jaiwanta Bai was born in Pali, Jalore into the family of Chauhans of Jalore. Her father, Akheraj Chauhan Songara was the Songara chief of Jalore.

== Marriage to Udai Singh ==
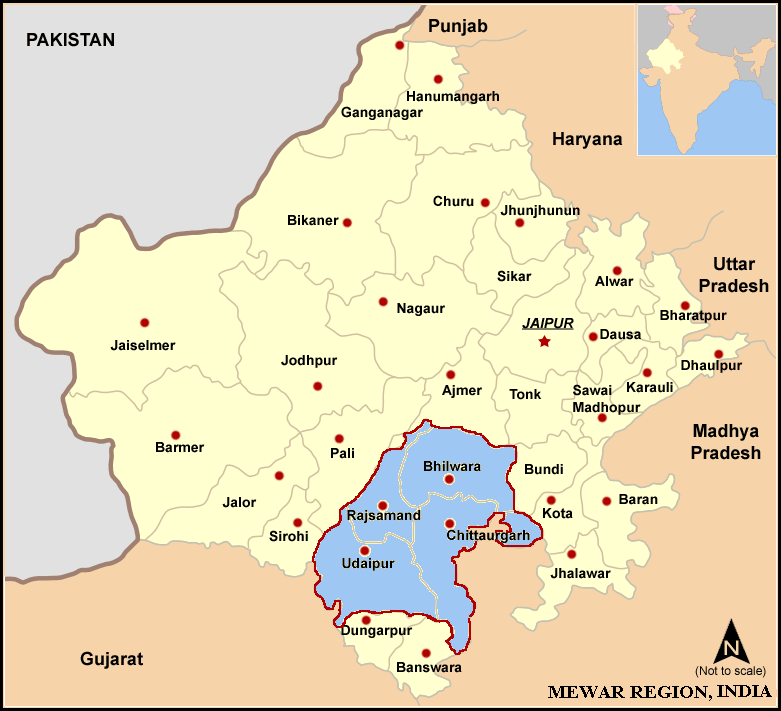
Kingdom of Mewar

Jaiwanta Bai was married to Udai Singh II, the 12th Rana of Mewar. She was his first wife and chief consort. Jaiwanta Bai gave birth to her son, Maharana Pratap on 9 May 1540 at Kumbhalgarh. She trained him in warfare and embedded values in him through the teachings of Ramayana and Mahabharata.

After the death of Udai Singh in 1572, Dheer Bai wanted her son Jagmal to succeed him but senior courtiers preferred Pratap, as the eldest son, to be their king. The desire of the nobles prevailed and Pratap ascended the throne as the 54th ruler of Mewar in the line of the Sisodia Rajputs. Jaiwanta Bai became the queen mother of Mewar.

== Maharani of Mewar ==
Jaiwanta Bai was known to be a Krishna devotee. As the Maharani of Mewar, she built the Badla Wali Sarai and Panghat Baori, in Mewar.

== In popular culture ==
- In the 2015 series, Bharat Ka Veer Putra – Maharana Pratap, Jaiwanta Bai was portrayed by Rajshree Thakur.
