= Bharat Ka Veer Putra – Maharana Pratap =

Indian historical television series (2013)

- Genre: Historical fiction Drama
- Created by: Abhimanyu Singh
- Written by: Nishikant Roy; Pranjal Saxena; Surabhi Saral; B.M. Vyas; Manikya Raju; Rajesh Saksham
- Directed by: Arif Shamsi; Vaibhav Mutha; Vicky Chauhan; Jitendra Srivastav
- Starring: Faisal Khan; Shakti Anand; Sharad Malhotra; Rajeev Bharadwaj (For entire cast see below)
- Theme music composer: Vaibhav Mutha; Karthik Shah
- Opening theme: Maharana Pratap By Swaroop Khan
- Composers: Dony Hazarika; Udbhav Ojha
- Country of origin: India
- Original language: Hindi
- No. of seasons: 1
- No. of episodes: 539

Production
- Producers: Abhimanyu Singh; Rupali Singh
- Production location: India
- Camera setup: Multi-camera
- Production company: Contiloe Entertainment

Original release
- Network: Sony Entertainment Television
- Release: 27 May 2013 – 10 December 2015

Bharat Ka Veer Putra – Maharana Pratap (transl. Brave Son of India – Maharana Pratap) is an Indian historical fiction series produced by Contiloe Entertainment. It is based on the life of Maharana Pratap, a sixteenth century ruler of Mewar kingdom. It starred Sharad Malhotra, Rachana Parulkar, Faisal Khan and Roshni Walia.

The series premiered on 27 May 2013. Amitabh Bachchan narrated the introductory part of the series in the first episode tracing the background of the Mewar family and their resistance to Foreign Invasions.

The series received positive reviews and won numerous awards and nominations. The final episode of the series aired on 10 December 2015.

== Cast ==
=== Main ===
- Sharad Malhotra as Maharana Pratap: 13th Maharana of the Kingdom of Mewar; Udai Singh and Jaiwanta Bai's son; Sajja Bai, Dheer Bai and Veer Bai's step-son; Shakti, Vikram, Jagmal, Maan and Chaand's half-brother; Ajabde Bai and Phool Bai's husband; Amar Singh's father
  - Faisal Khan as young Pratap
- Rachana Parulkar as Maharani Ajabde Bai Punwar: Maharani of the Kingdom of Mewar; Rao Mamrakh and Hansa Bai's daughter; Pratap Singh's first wife and chief consort; Amar Singh's mother
  - Roshni Walia as young Ajabde
- Heena Parmar as Rani Phool Bai Rathore; Ram Singh's daughter; Chandrasen's niece; Rao Maldev's granddaughter; Pratap's second wife; Amar Singh's step-mother
  - Jannat Zubair Rahmani as young Phool
- Jineet Rath as Maharana Amar Singh I: 14th Maharana of the Kingdom of Mewar; Pratap Singh and Ajabde Bai's son; Phool Bai's step-son; Udai Singh and Jaiwanta Bai's paternal grandson; Rao Mamrakh and Hansa Bai's maternal grandson
- Shakti Anand as Maharana Udai Singh II: 12th Maharana of the Kingdom of Mewar: Rana Sanga's son; Jaiwanta Bai, Sajja Bai, Dheer Bai and Veer Bai's husband; Pratap, Shakti, Vikram, Jagmal, Maan and Chaand's father; Amar Singh's grandfather
- Rajshree Thakur as Maharani Jaiwanta Bai Songara: Maharani of the Kingdom of Mewar: Udai Singh's first wife and chief consort; Pratap Singh's mother; Amar Singh's grandmother
- Krip Suri / Avinesh Rekhi as Jalal-ud-din Muhammad Akbar - Mughal emperor; Ruqaiya Sultan, Salima Sultan and Heer Bai's husband
  - Sahil Deshmukh Khan / Arish Bhiwandiwala / Vishal Jethwa as young Akbar

=== Recurring ===
- Divyaalakshmi as Rani Sajja Bai Solankini - Udai Singh's second wife; Shakti Singh and Vikramdev's mother; Pratap, Jagmal, Maan and Chaand's step-mother
- Aashka Goradia as Rani Dheer Bai Bhatiyani - Udai Singh's third and favourite wife; Jagmal, Chaand and Maan's mother; Pratap, Shakti and Vikram's step-mother
- Sarika Dhillon as Rani Veer Bai Jhala - Udai Singh's fourth wife; Pratap, Shakti, Vikram, Jagmal, Maan and Chaand's step-mother
- Vineet Kumar as Kunwar Shakti Singh - Udai Singh and Sajja Bai's son; Vikram's brother; Pratap, Jagmal, Maan and Chaand's half-brother
  - Dhruv Sangwan as Young Shakti
- Yash Mistry as Kunwar Vikram Singh - Udai Singh and Sajja Bai's son; Shakti's brother; Pratap, Jagmal, Maan and Chaand's half-brother
- Khuram Khan as Kunwar Jagmal Singh - Udai Singh and Dheer Bai's son; Maan and Chaand's brother; Pratap, Shakti and Vikram's half-brother
- Vaishali Takkar / Vinita Mahesh as Rajkumari Maan Kanwar - Udai Singh and Dheer Bai's daughter; Jagmal and Chaand's sister; Pratap, Shakti and Vikram's half-sister
- Deeksha K Sonalkar as Rajkumari Chaand Kanwar - Udai Singh and Dheer Bai's daughter; Jagmal and Maan's sister; Pratap, Shakti and Vikram's half-sister
  - Tunisha Sharma as young Chaand
- Bakul Thakkar as Rao Mamrakh Punwar - Governor of Bijolia; Hansa Bai's husband; Ajabde's father; Pratap's father-in-law
- Anjali Rana as Rani Hansa Bai - Rao Mamrakh's wife; Ajabde's mother; Pratap's mother-in-law
- Rajeev Bharadwaj as Rawat Sai Das Chundawat - Udai Singh and Mewar's chief; Governor of Salumber
- Shaize Kazmi as Rawat Krishna Das Chundawat - Udai Singh and Mewar's chief; Nephew of Rawat Sai Das Chundawat; Governor of Salumber
- Ankur Nayyar as Acharya Raghvendra; Pratap's Guru
- Triyug Mantri as Pandit Chakrapani Mishra - Pratap's childhood friend and his Darbari-Pandit in the court; Saubhagyavati's husband
  - Yash Karia as young Chakrapani
- Rushiraj Pawar as Patta - Ajabde's sworn brother; Mewar's army commander, governor of Kelwa
- Nirbhay Wadhwa as Hakim Khan Suri - Pratap's army commander in Battle of Haldighati
- Anand Goradia as Rao Surtan Singh - Governor of Bundi
- Ved Thapar as Jaimal Rathore - Mewar's army commander and erstwhile king of Merta
- Tasha Kapoor as Harka Bai / Heer Bai - Princess of Amer; Akbar's wife and third empress consort
- Falaq Naaz as Ruqaiya Sultan Begum - Princess of Mughal empire; Akbar's cousin and first wife and chief consort
- Riya Deepsi as Salima Sultan Begum - Princess of Mughal Empire; Akbar's cousin and second chief consort; Bairam Khan's former wife
- Jaya Bhattacharya as Maham Anga - Akbar's foster mother; Daughter of Babur from his consort Bibi Mubarika Begum
- Shahbaz Khan as Bairam Khan - Akbar's guardian; Salima Sultan's first husband
- Muskaan Nancy James as Mirabai - Bhoj Raj's widow; Pratap's aunt; Udai Singh's Sister-in-law; Krishna devotee
- Shailesh Datar as Tulsidas - Rama's devotee
- Ankit Bhardwaj as Rao Chandrasen Rathore - Maldev Rathore's son; Ram Singh's brother; Phool Bai's uncle
- Surendra Pal as Rao Maldev Rathore - Phool Bai's grandfather; King of Marwar
- Raj Thakur as Kalyan Singh Rathore "Kalla" - Jaimal Rathore's nephew
- Mrinal Deshraj as Rani Uma Bhatiyani - Maldev Rathore's wife; Dheer Bai's sister
- Hemant Choudhary as Dondiya Thakur Sanda - Udai Singh's army commander
- Piyush Sharma as Jhala Mann Singh - Pratap's commander in Battle of Haldighati; governor of Badi Sadri
- Manoj Verma as Bhil Rana Kheta / Rana Punja - Pratap's commander in Battle of Haldighati
- Vishal Patni as Bhim Singh Dodiya - Pratap's army commander in battle of Haldighati; governor of Sardargarh
- Vindhya Tiwari as Rani Durgavati - Dalpat Shah's wife and regent of Gondwana
- Raju Shrestha as Mia Tansen - Akbar's Navaratnas
- Neha Bam as Dai Kokoi - Dheer Bai's maid
- Sharhaan Singh as Ismail Khan
- Dakssh Ajit Singh as Raj Rana Bahadur
- Reema Vohra as Gauhar Jaan
- Pratibha Paul as Khetu
- Kunal Bakshi as Peer Mohammad
- Tarun Khanna as Zahir Saaka
- Ritesh M M Shukla as Takkal Pandit
- Javed Pathan as Husain Ali Quli Khan: Akbar's Soldier in Siege Of Chittor
- Manish Bishla as Aalim Khan - Akbar's Soldier in Siege Of Chittor
- Papiya Sengupta
- Mann Singh Bagga as Mehmood - An Afghan warrior

=== Cameo appearance ===
- Aarav Chowdhary as Maharana Sangram Singh I of Mewar: 8th Maharana of the Kingdom of Mewar: Udai Singh II's father; Jaiwanta Bai Songara, Sajja Bai Solankini, Dheer Bai Bhattiyani and Veer Bai Jhala's father-in-law; Pratap Singh I, Shakti, Vikram, Jagmal, Maan and Chaand's grandfather; Amar Singh I's great-grandfather
- Gufi Paintal as Humayun: Akbar's father
- Priya Marathe as Saubhagyawati
  - Neeharika Roy as Child Saubhagyawati
- Amit Singh as Soldier of Rao Surtan Singh
- Anmol Soni as Bahlol Khan

== Awards and nominations ==
=== Indian Television Academy Awards ===
Year	Category	Recipient	Result	Ref.
2013	Best Historical/ Mythological Serial	Abhimanyu Raj Singh	Won	
2013	Best Serial - Drama	Contiloe Entertainment	Nominated	
2013	Best Actress in a Negative Role	Aashka Goradia	Won	
2013	GR8! Face of the Year – Male	Faisal Khan	Nominated	
2013	Best Art Direction	Sandesh Gondhalekar & Viswanath Sundaram	Won	
2013	Best Costumes	Nikhat Mariyam Neerushaa	Won	
2013	Best Editing	K. Rajgopal	Won	
2013	Best Title Music/Song Track	Karthik Shah	Won	
2014	Best Historical/ Mythological Serial	Abhimanyu Raj Singh	Won	
2014	Best Actress in a Negative Role	Aashka Goradia	Nominated	
2014	Best Child Artist	Faisal Khan	Won	
2014	Most Promising Child Star	Faisal Khan	Won	
2014	Best Actor in a Supporting Role	Shakti Anand	Won	

=== Indian Telly Awards ===
Year	Category	Recipient	Result	Ref.
2014	Best Historical/ Mythological Series	Abhimanyu Raj Singh	Won	
2014	Best Child Artiste - Male	Faisal Khan	Won	
2014	Best Child Artiste - Female	Roshni Walia	Nominated	
2014	Best Actress in a Negative Role	Aashka Goradia	Nominated	
2014	Best Actress in a Supporting Role	Rajshree Thakur	Won	
2014	Best Actress in a Supporting Role (Jury)	Rajshree Thakur	Nominated	
2014	Best Actor in a Supporting Role (Jury)	Shakti Anand	Won	
2014	Best Dialogue Writer (drama series & soap)	B.M.Vyas	Won	
2014	Best Screenplay Writer (drama series & soap)	Surbhi Saral	Won	
2015	Best Historical/ Mythological Series	Abhimanyu Raj Singh	Won	
2015	Best Actor in a Lead Role	Sharad Malhotra	Nominated	
2015	Best Daily Serial	Contiloe Entertainment	Nominated	
2015	Best Actor in a Negative Role	Avinesh Rekhi	Nominated	

=== Gold Awards ===
Year	Category	Recipient	Result	Ref.
2014	Best Actress in a Negative Role	Aashka Goradia	Nominated	
2014	Best Actor in a Lead Role	Faisal Khan	Nominated	
2015	Best Actor in a Lead Role	Sharad Malhotra	Nominated	

=== BIG Star Entertainment Awards ===
Year	Category	Recipient	Result	Ref.
2013	Most Entertaining Television Show	Abhimanyu Raj Singh	Won	

=== Lions Gold Awards ===
Year	Category	Recipient	Result	Ref.
2013	Best Fiction Serial	Contiloe Entertainment	Won	
2015	Best Jodi	Rachana Parulkar & Sharad Malhotra	Won	
