= Abecassis =

Abecassis or Abécassis or Abecasis (Hebrew: אבוקסיס, אבקסיס) is a Sephardic patronymic most commonly found among Moroccan Jews. Notable people with the surname include:

- Raymonde Abecassis, (born 1943), Moroccan-Israeli singer and actress
- Eliette Abécassis (born 1969), French writer
- Eryck Abecassis (born 1956), French composer and musician
- George Abecassis (1913–1991), English race driver
- Gonçalo Abecasis (born 1976), Portuguese genetic epidemiologist
- Yael Abecassis (born 1967), Israeli actress
- Nina Pinto-Abecasis (1971–2019), Israeli folklorist
