= Tu Chal Pudha =

2022 Indian Marathi language TV series

- Genre: Drama
- Written by: Shweta Pendse; Priya Ramnathan; Sayali Kedar
- Directed by: Raju Sawant
- Starring: See below
- Country of origin: India
- Original language: Marathi
- No. of episodes: 456

Production
- Producer: Zee Studios
- Production locations: Mumbai, Maharashtra, India
- Camera setup: Multi-camera
- Running time: 22 minutes
- Production company: Zee Studios

Original release
- Network: Zee Marathi
- Release: 15 August 2022 – 13 January 2024

Tu Chal Pudha (transl. You go ahead) is an Indian Marathi language TV series which aired on Zee Marathi. It is directed by Raju Sawant and produced by Zee Studios. It premiered from 15 August 2022 by replacing Man Udu Udu Jhala. It stars Deepa Parab, Aditya Vaidya and Dhanashree Kadgaonkar in lead roles.

== Summary ==
The story revolves around Ashwini, an ideal housewife and a perfect mother, and what she does for her family. The family has a dream of buying a luxury home one day and are working hard for the sake of it. Ashwini also wishes to contribute her part to accomplishing their dream, but the family members are skeptical of her decision and believe that she cannot work and make money. However, Ashwini does not back off from her opinion and opens a beauty parlor. She starts earning money and becomes an independent woman.

== Cast ==
=== Main ===
- Deepa Parab as Ashwini Divakar Mhatre / Ashwini Shreyas Waghmare
- Aditya Vaidya as Shreyas Prakash Waghmare
- Dhanashree Kadgaonkar as Shilpi Prakash Waghmare / Shilpi Vidyut Mhatre

=== Recurring ===
Shreyas' family

- Vaishnavi Gaikwad as Mayuri Shreyas Waghmare
- Pihu Gosavi as Kuhu Shreyas Waghmare
- Devendra Dodke as Prakash Digambar Waghmare
- Pratibha Goregaonkar as Ujjwala Prakash Waghmare

Ashwini's family

- Deepkar Parkar as Vidyut Divakar Mhatre
- Yogesh Kelkar as Divakar Mhatre
- Leena Pandit as Kamlavati Divakar Mhatre
- Reyansh Juwatkar as Sanjay Vidyut Mhatre

Others

- Pari Telang as Vrushali Sontakke / Meera Kaushik Kalsekar
- Vandana Marathe as Jayashri
- Ganesh Sarkate as Baban Pande
- Sneha Majgaonkar as Prajakta Pande
- Darshan Pandya as Anshuman Patnayak
- Maitrey Bapat as Rudra
- Charuta Supekar as Kunda
- Priyanka Deshmane as Rutuja
- Shalaka Chitale as Mrs. Shirke
- Dhruv Datar as Vikram Mohite
- Senjali Masand as Jennifer
- Prachi Pisat as Tara
- Raj More as Pratik
- Siddhi Katkar as Sejal
- Aditya Parab as Rajat
- Raj Gavande as Rachit
- Shraddha Potdar as Kartiki
- Vallari Kamlakar as Daisy
- Unknown as Pooja Vachaspati
- Vaibhav Vijay as Daljeet
- Omkar Parab as Aditya Desai
- Swapnil Parjane as Jignesh
- Rushi Rajkiran as Adhokshaj Khandeparkar

Mrs. India contestants

- Isha Koppikar as Judge
- Stavan Shinde as Host
- Monika Singh as Rituparna Das
- Mrunal Bokil as Preeta Balchandran
- Supriti Shivalkar as Ashlesha Shivalkar
- Unknown as Revati Ganeshan
- Varsharani Patel as Niyati Rao
- Dinsha Gulati as Amrit Kaur
- Khushi Solanki as Usha Chhada
- Anuja Ashish as Mithila Kalangutakar
- Aditi Karnataki as Radhika Patel
- Amruta Vishwanath as Akriti Zha
- Neha Vaze-Paranjape as Divyanshi Rajput

== Awards ==
Zee Marathi Utsav Natyancha Awards
Year	Category	Recipient	Role	Ref.
2022	Best Actress	Deepa Parab	Ashwini Waghmare	
2023	Best Title Song			
2023	Best Father-in-law	Devendra Dodke	Prakash Waghmare	
2023	Best Supporting Female	Vaishnavi Kalyankar	Mayuri Waghmare	

=== Special episode (1 hour) ===
1. 27 November 2022
2. 29 January 2023
3. 12 March 2023
4. 23 April 2023
5. 11 June 2023
6. 23 July 2023
7. 10 September 2023
8. 17 December 2023

== Adaptations ==
Language	Title	Original Release	Network(s)	Last aired	Notes
Marathi	Tu Chal Pudha तू चाल पुढं	15 August 2022	Zee Marathi	13 January 2024	Original
Hindi	Bas Itna Sa Khwaab बस इतनासा ख्वाब	3 December 2024	Zee TV	13 April 2025	Remake
