= Heena Parmar =

Indian actress (born 1990)

- Occupation: Actress
- Years active: 2011–present
- Known for: Jodha Akbar; Bharat Ka Veer Putra – Maharana Pratap; Chakravartin Ashoka Samrat; Anjaan: Special Crimes Unit

Heena Parmar is an Indian actress who works in Hindi television. She made her acting debut in 2011 with Haar Jeet where she portrayed Mihika Maansingh. Parmar is best known for her portrayal of Anarkali in Jodha Akbar and Rani Phool Bai Rathore in Bharat Ka Veer Putra – Maharana Pratap.

Parmar also portrayed Chanda Maurya in Chakravartin Ashoka Samrat, Madhavi Ranawat in Love Ka Hai Intezaar and ASP Aditi Sharma in Anjaan: Special Crimes Unit. Parmar was last seen portraying Shaoli in Noyontara.

== Career ==
Parmar made her acting debut in 2011 with Haar Jeet. From 2011 to 2012, she portrayed Mihika Maansingh in Haar Jeet and Saraswati Vishal Chaturvedi alongside Anshul Trivedi in Main Lakshmi Tere Aangan Ki. In 2013, she portrayed Ishita Scindia in Punar Vivaah alongside Akshay Dogra. From 2013 to 2014, she played Haseena in Dil Jo Keh Na Saka. In 2014, she appeared in Itti Si Khushi as Akanksha and played Ragini in an episode of Ishq Kills.

In 2015, Parmar's portrayal of Anarkali in Jodha Akbar opposite Ravi Bhatia and Rani Phool Bai Rathore in Bharat Ka Veer Putra – Maharana Pratap opposite Sharad Malhotra, proved as a major turning point in her career. In 2016, she portrayed Princess Chanda Maurya opposite Ankit Arora in Chakravartin Ashoka Samrat. She then portrayed Madhavi Madhav Ranawat in Love Ka Hai Intezaar in 2017.

Parmar portrayed ASP Aditi Sharma in 2018, opposite Gashmeer Mahajani in Anjaan: Special Crimes Unit. In 2019, she played Mohini / Malmal alongside Ankit Raj in Season 2 of Main Bhi Ardhangini. In 2020, she portrayed Sona/Naagkanya in Ek Anokhi Rakshak - Naagkanya alongside Ankit Narang and appeared as Tulsi in Vighnaharta Ganesh. Parmar played Payal Sharma in Aye Mere Humsafar from 2020 to 2021. She also appeared in the short film Between Youuuu & Meeee in 2022.

In May 2023, she will be seen portraying Arushi in Pandya Store.

== Filmography ==
=== Television ===
Year	Title	Role	Notes	Ref.
2011–2012	Haar Jeet	Mihika Maansingh		
2011–2012	Main Lakshmi Tere Aangan Ki	Saraswati Vishal Chaturvedi		
2013	Punar Vivah	Ishita Scindia		
2013	Crime Patrol	Suhasi	Episode: "A Nation Awakens"	
2013–2014	Dil Jo Keh Na Saka	Haseena		
2014	Itti Si Khushi	Akanksha		
2014	Ishq Kills	Ragini	Episode 5	
2015	Jodha Akbar	Anarkali		
2015	Bharat Ka Veer Putra – Maharana Pratap	Rani Phool Bai Rathore		
2016	Chakravartin Ashoka Samrat	Rani Chanda Maurya		
2017	Love Ka Hai Intezaar	Madhavi Ranawat		
2018	Anjaan: Special Crimes Unit	ASP Aditi Sharma		
2019	Main Bhi Ardhangini	Mohini / Malmal		
2020	Ek Anokhi Rakshak – Naagkanya	Sona / Naagkanya		
2020	Vighnaharta Ganesh	Tulsi	Cameo appearance	
2020–2021	Aye Mere Humsafar	Payal Sharma		
2023	Pandya Store	Arushi		
2025–2026	Noyontara	Shaoli Roy		

=== Film ===
Year	Title	Role	Notes	Ref.
2022	Between Youuuu & Meeee	Tiya	Short film	
