= A Nation Awakens =

- Crime Patrol episodes
- Episode nos.: Season 4 Episodes 296 & 297
- Directed by: R. Amit Kumar Jha
- Written by: Subramanian S. Iyer
- Based on: 2012 Delhi gang rape and murder
- Original air dates: 21 September 2013 & 22 September 2013
- Running time: 81 minutes

"A Nation Awakens" is the 296th and 297th special two-part episode of the fourth season of the Sony TV television series Crime Patrol (features real crime stories) and 546th and 547th episodes overall. Originally aired in two parts on 21 September and 22 September 2013, the episodes were written by Subramanian S. Iyer and director by R. Amit Kumar Jha. The principal photography of the episodes was held in Mumbai, India and was commenced in the first week of January 2013. The episode was hosted by Anup Soni and Sakshi Tanwar. Heena Parmar played the victim, while Sanjeev Tyagi played the head police inspector.

== Plot ==
The two-part episode is about the 16 December 2012 incident, the day when in a moving bus, a 23-year-old physiotherapy intern was brutally raped by six people, including a juvenile. She was travelling with her male friend. The incident is termed as the most heinous crime that one can commit with someone. The episodes were to be aired on 11 and 12 January 2013, but on the day when it had to be premiered, the Information and broadcasting Ministry of India had asked Sony TV not to air those episodes.

On 10 September 2013, the channel got the green signal from the Information and broadcasting Ministry of India to telecast the two-part episode on the show, and then the channel subsequently aired the promos of the episode from the same date. The episode was then telecast in two parts on 21 September and 22 September 2013.

== Cast ==
- Anup Soni as Host
- Sakshi Tanwar as Host
- Heena Parmar as Suhasi, the victim
- Sanjeev Tyagi as Police Inspector

== Reception ==
=== Critical response ===
After telecasting the special two-part episode on the respective channel, the episodes had made Crime Patrol the number one show on 21 and 22 September 2013 on Indian television. Sneha Rajani, executive vice president and business head of Sony TV, told IANS, "We had a total of 10.4 million TVTs (Television Viewership in Thousands)." The channel had decided to repeat the episode.
