= Maharana Pratap =

Maharana of Mewar from 1572 to 1597

- Maharana; Mewari Rana
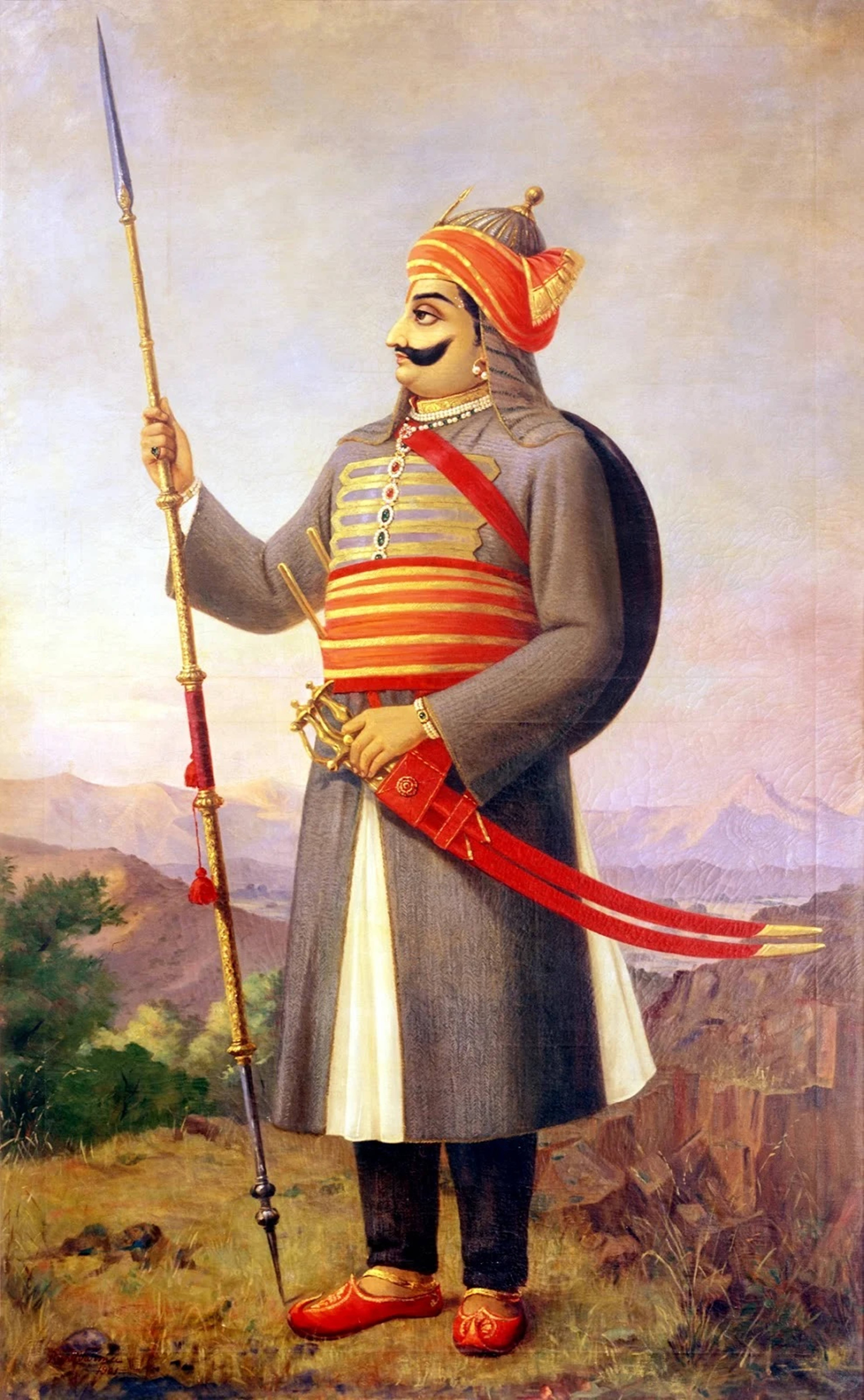
- Portrait of Maharana Pratap by Raja Ravi Varma

13th Rana of Mewar
- Reign: 28 February 1572 – 19 January 1597
- Coronation: 28 February 1572
- Predecessor: Udai Singh II
- Successor: Amar Singh I
- Ministers: Bhamashah; Jhala Man Singh
- Born: 18 May 1540; Kumbhalgarh, Kingdom of Mewar (present day: Kumbhalgarh Fort, Rajsamand District, Rajasthan, India)
- Died: 19 January 1597 (aged 56); Chavand, Kingdom of Mewar (Present day: Chavand, Udaipur District, Rajasthan, India)
- Consort: Ajabde
- Spouse: 10: Phool Bai Rathore; Solankhinpur Bai; Champa Bai Jhala; Jaso Bai Chauhan; Alamde Bai Chauhan; Asha Bai Khichar; Shahmati Bai Hada; Ratnawati Bai Parmar; Lakhi Bai Solanki; Amar Bai Rathore
- Issue: 22 (including Amar Singh I and Bhagwan Das) and 5 daughters
Names
- Maharana Pratap Singh Sisodia
- Dynasty: Sisodia
- Father: Udai Singh II
- Mother: Jaiwanta Bai Songara
- Religion: Hinduism

Pratap Singh I (18 May 1540 – 19 January 1597), popularly known as Maharana Pratap (IPA: [məɦaːˈɾaːɳaː pɾəˈtaːp]), was king of the Kingdom of Mewar, in north-western India in the present-day state of Rajasthan, from 1572 until his death in 1597. He is notable for leading the Rajput resistance against the expansionist policy of the Mughal Emperor Akbar including the battle of Haldighati.

== Ancestry ==
Ancestors of Maharana Pratap

16. Rana Kumbha
9. Rana Raimal
17. Gaurji Kanak Deiji
4. Rana Sanga
18. Ratan Singh Jhala
10. Ratan Jhali
2. Udai Singh II
11. Rao Nirbudh
5. Karnavati Hada
12. Bundi Sa
1. Pratap Singh I
6. Akshayraj I
13. Rao Jagmal I
3. Jaiwanta Bai
7. Jharna Bai

== Early life and accession ==
Maharana Pratap was born to Udai Singh II of Mewar and Jaiwanta Bai in 1540, the year in which Udai Singh ascended to the throne after defeating Vanvir Singh. His younger brothers were Shakti Singh, Vikram Singh and Jagmal Singh. Pratap also had two stepsisters: Chand Kanwar and Man Kanwar. His chief consort was Ajabde Bai Punwar of Bijolia. Their eldest son was Amar Singh I. He belonged to the royal family of Mewar. After the death of Udai Singh in 1572, Rani Dheer Bai Bhatiyani wanted her son Jagmal to succeed him but senior courtiers preferred Pratap, as the eldest son, to be their king. The desire of the nobles prevailed and Pratap ascended the throne as Maharana Pratap, the 54th ruler of Mewar in the line of the Sisodia Rajputs. He was crowned in Gogunda on the auspicious day of Holi. Jagmal swore revenge and left for Ajmer, to join the armies of Emperor Akbar who later gave him a portion of Sirohi.

== Conflict with the Mughals ==
=== Background ===
Akbar initially favored diplomacy over direct conflict in his dealings with Maharana Pratap. Although Jagmal, Pratap's rival, sought Akbar's support and had been named successor by his father, the emperor refrained from military intervention—largely due to ongoing unrest in Gujarat. Instead, Akbar dispatched several emissaries to negotiate with Pratap, including Jalal Khan, Man Singh, Raja Bhagwant das, and Todar Mal. However, all these attempts ended in failure. Pratap consistently resisted submission, either by making ambiguous promises or by declining to meet the envoys altogether. Rajput sources claim that Pratap even insulted Man Singh by avoiding a feast held in his honor, an account many modern historians consider exaggerated. The breakdown of negotiations likely stemmed from Akbar's demands—such as personal attendance at the Mughal court, payment of tribute, political allegiance, or a matrimonial alliance—all of which were unacceptable to Pratap. By late 1573 A.D., it had become evident that a peaceful resolution was unlikely, and a military confrontation appeared inevitable.

Some scholars suggest that a key but often overlooked point of contention between Akbar and Maharana Pratap was an elephant named Ram Prasad. Historical sources such as ʽAbd al-Qadir Badayuni and Abul Fazl mention that Akbar had repeatedly requested this elephant from the Rana, but Pratap refused to surrender it. The elephant was eventually captured by the Mughal army during the Battle of Haldighati and brought to Akbar. Badauni even describes Ram Prasad as a subject of dispute. This incident has been interpreted by some historians as further evidence of Pratap's unwillingness to submit to Mughal authority, casting doubt on claims that he ever sent his son Amar Singh or any proposal to Akbar's court, as suggested by Abu'l-Fazl.

The conflicts between Pratap Singh and Akbar led to the Battle of Haldighati.

According to Indian Journal of Secularism, in his campaign to extend his empire, Akbar presented Rana Pratap with the rank of Panj Hazari (commander of an army of 5,000). Rana Pratap refused, demanding instead the rank of Dah Hazari (commander of an army of 10,000).leading to battle of haldighati.

=== Battle of Haldighati ===
The Siege of Chittorgarh in 1567-1568 had led to the loss of the fertile eastern belt of Mewar to the Mughals. However, the rest of the wooded and hilly kingdom in the Aravalli range was still under the control of Maharana Pratap. Mughal Emperor Akbar was intent on securing a stable route to Gujarat through Mewar; when Pratap Singh was crowned king (Maharana) in 1572, Akbar sent a number of envoys, including one by Raja Man Singh I of Amber, entreating him to become a vassal like many other rulers in Rajputana. When Pratap refused to personally submit to Akbar and several attempts to diplomatically settle the issue failed, war became inevitable.

The forces of Pratap Singh and Mughal and Rajput general Man Singh met on 18 June 1576 beyond a narrow mountain pass at Haldighati near Gogunda, modern day Rajsamand in Rajasthan. This came to be known as the battle of Haldighati. Pratap Singh fielded a force of around 3000 cavalry and 400 Bhil archers. Man Singh commanded an army numbering around 10,000 men. After a fierce battle lasting more than three hours, Pratap found himself wounded and the day lost. He managed to retreat to the hills and lived to fight another day. The Mughals were victorious and inflicted significant casualties among the forces of Mewar but failed to capture Maharana Pratap.

Rana Pratap was able to escape due to selfless devotion of chief of Jhala who drew upon himself the attack of armies by declaring himself to be Rana.

Haldighati was a futile victory for the Mughals, as they were unable to kill or capture Pratap, or any of his close family members in Udaipur. While the sources also claim that Pratap was able to make a successful escape, Man Singh managed to conquer Gogunda within a week after Haldighati then ended his campaign. Subsequently, Akbar himself led a sustained campaign against the Rana in September 1576, and soon, Gogunda, Udaipur, and Kumbhalgarh were all under Mughal control.

=== Post-Haldighati Mughal invasions ===
Shahbaz Khan Kamboh led multiple invasions that resulted in the subjugation of key areas in Mewar, such as Kumbhalgarh, Mandalgarh, Gogunda, and Central Mewar, bringing them permanently under Mughal rule. The Mughal Empire established its supremacy in Mewar after Shahbaz Khan's invasions. This ultimately led to a significant weakening of Pratap's power, forcing him to seek shelter in his hilly abode.

== Rebuilding and Reconquest ==
=== Reclaiming territory ===
Mughal pressure on Mewar relaxed after 1579 following rebellions in Bengal and Bihar and Mirza Muhammad Hakim's incursion into the Punjab. After this Akbar sent Jagannath Kachhwaha to invade Mewar in 1584. This time too Mewar army defeated Mughals and forced them to retreat. In 1585, Akbar moved to Lahore and remained there for the next twelve years watching the situation in the north-west. No major Mughal expedition was sent to Mewar during this period. Taking advantage of the situation, Pratap recovered some of the Mughal occupied areas of Mewar and captured thirty-six Mughal outposts. Udaipur, Mohi, Gogunda, Mandal and Pandwara were some of the important areas that were recaptured during this conflict. According to the 1588 inscription near Jahazpur, the Rana gave the lands of Pander to a trusted follower called Sadulnath Trivedi. G.N. Sharma claims that the Pander inscription is proof that the Rana had occupied north-eastern Mewar and was granting lands to those who had been loyal to him. From 1585 till his death, the Rana had recovered a large part of Mewar. The citizens who had migrated out of Mewar started returning during this time. There was good monsoon which helped to revive the agriculture of Mewar. The economy also started getting better and trade in the area started increasing. The Rana was able to capture the territories around Chittor but could not fulfill his dream of capturing Chittor itself.

=== Financial backing and reorganisation ===
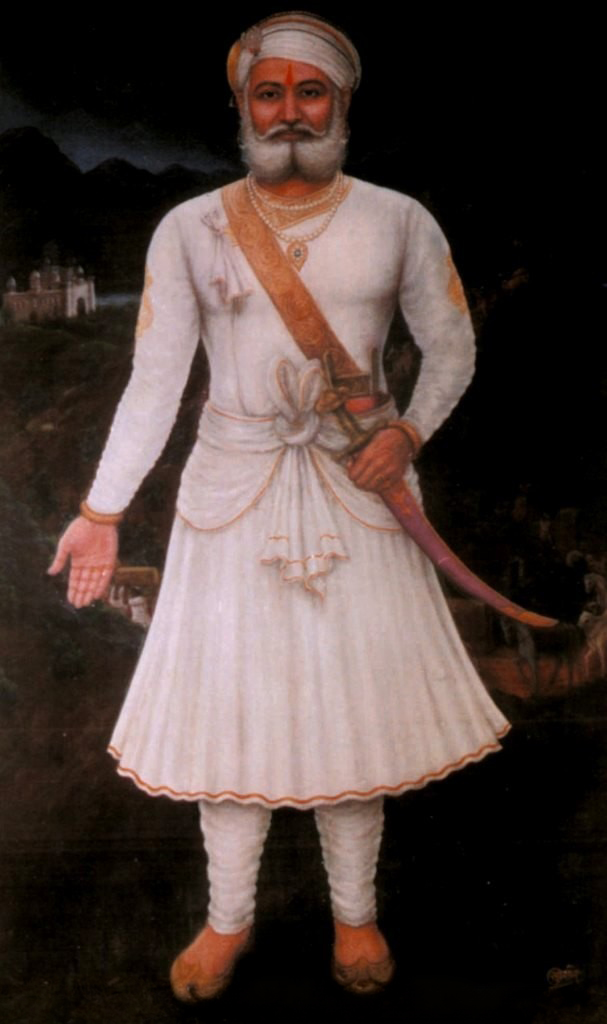
Bhamashah, Jain merchant, who financed Pratap's resistance against Mughal Empire

Following the Battle of Haldighati in 1576 and the subsequent Mughal capture of key Mewari strongholds, Maharana Pratap's administration faced severe military attrition and financial depletion. Forced into guerrilla warfare in the Aravalli hills, the Mewar army lacked the logistical resources necessary to sustain a prolonged regional resistance against the Mughal Empire.

During this critical juncture, his minister, Bhamashah—a prominent Oswal Jain merchant—intervened to prevent the collapse of the resistance. In the 16th century, Bhamashah famously financed Maharana Pratap's military campaigns against the Mughal Empire with his immense personal fortune. According to historical chronicles recorded by James Tod and corroborated by modern historians, this financial grant was substantial enough to maintain a fighting force of 25,000 soldiers for 12 years.

This intervention was not strictly financial; Bhamashah also served as a strategic military commander, actively participating in subsequent campaigns alongside Pratap to reclaim lost territories. This massive economic injection allowed Maharana Pratap to reorganize his scattered troops, upgrade his military logistics, and effectively transition from mere survival to an aggressive reconquest of Mewar.

== Patronage of art and literature ==
Maharana Pratap's court at Chavand provided refuge to numerous poets, artists, writers, and artisans. During his reign, the Chavand school of art emerged and developed as a distinctive artistic tradition. His support for cultural activities is evidenced by the presence of notable figures such as the artist Nasiruddin in his court.

== Death ==
Maharana Pratap reportedly died from injuries sustained in a hunting accident at Chavand on 19 January 1597, at the age of 56. He was succeeded by his eldest son, Amar Singh I. On his deathbed, Pratap is said to have instructed his son never to submit to the Mughals and to make efforts to reclaim Chittor.

According to some accounts, the Mughal emperor Akbar was deeply affected upon hearing the news of Maharana Pratap's death. The court poet Dursa Arha is said to have eulogised Pratap in the Mughal court as a mark of respect.

== Legacy ==
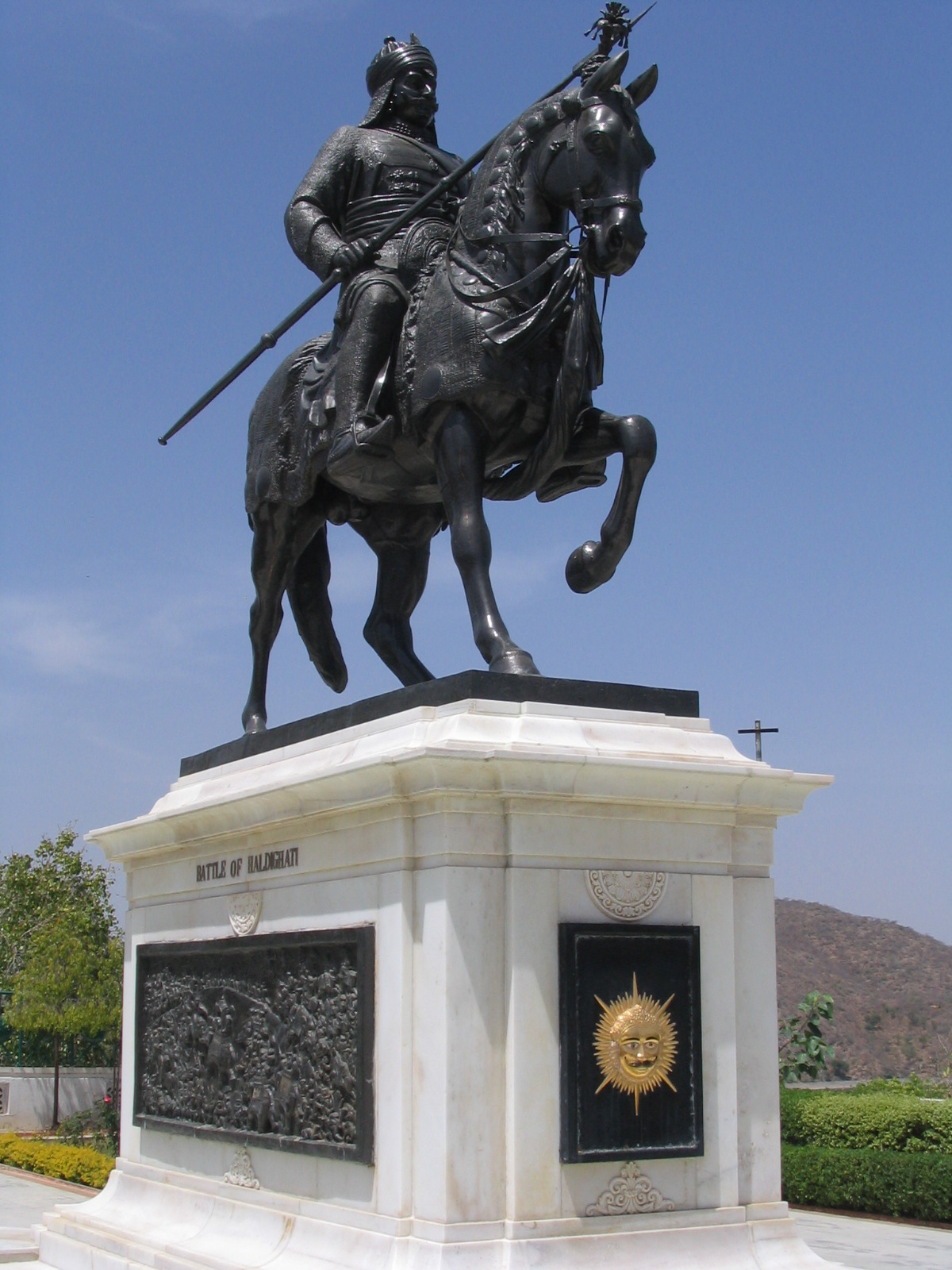
Statue of Maharana Pratap in City Palace, Udaipur.

Maharana Pratap is a prominent figure in both folk and contemporary Rajasthani culture and is viewed as a folk hero and celebrated warrior in that state, as well as in India as a whole.

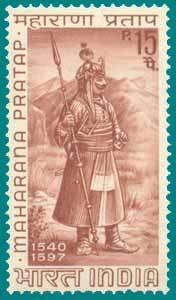
Stamp of India, Commemoration Maharana Pratap , 1967

Historian Satish Chandra notes –

"Rana Pratap's defiance of the mighty Mughal empire, almost alone and unaided by the other Rajput states, constitute a glorious saga of Rajput valour and the spirit of self sacrifice for cherished principles. Rana Pratap's methods of guerrilla warfare was later elaborated further by Malik Ambar, the Deccani general, and by Shivaji".

Bandyopadhyay also seconds Satish Chandra's view with the observation that

Pratap's successful defiance of Mughals using guerrilla strategy also proved inspirational to figures ranging from Shivaji to anti-British revolutionaries in Bengal.

In 2007, a statue of Maharana Pratap was unveiled by former President Pratibha Patil in the Parliament of India.

== In popular culture ==
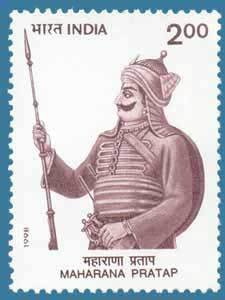
Maharana Pratap Stamp of India - 1998

=== Film and television ===
- 1988–1989: Bharat Ek Khoj, broadcast on Doordarshan, where he was played by Puneet Issar
- 2012: Maharana Pratap: The First Freedom Fighter
- 2013–2015: Jodha Akbar, broadcast on Zee TV, where he was played by Anurag Sharma
- 2013–2015: Bharat Ka Veer Putra – Maharana Pratap, broadcast by Sony Entertainment Television (India), where he was portrayed by Faisal Khan and Sharad Malhotra
- 2016: ABP News presented Bharatvarsha, in which episode 8 showcased the story of Maharana Pratap.
- 2023: Deepraj Rana as Maharana Pratap in Webseries Taj: Divided by Blood on Zee5

== See also ==
- Udaipur State
- Durgadas Rathore
- Maharanas: A Thousand Year War for Dharma

== Sources ==
- Sarkar, Jadunath (1960). Military History of India. Orient Longmans. pp. 75–81. ISBN 9780861251551.
- Chandra, Satish (2005). Medieval India (Part Two): From Sultanat to the Mughals. Har-Anand Publications. ISBN 9788124110669.
- Rana, Bhawan Singh (2004), Maharana Pratap, Diamond Pocket Books, ISBN 9788128808258
- Majumdar, R. C., ed. (1974). History and Culture of the Indian People. Vol. VII. Bombay: Bharatiya Vidya Bhavan.
- Augustus, Frederick (1890). The Emperor Akbar, a contribution towards the history of India in the 16th century (Vol. 1). Translated by Annette Susannah Beveridge. Thacker, Spink and Co., Calcutta.
- de la Garza, Andrew (2016). The Mughal Empire at War: Babur, Akbar and the Indian Military Revolution, 1500–1605. Routledge. ISBN 9781317245315.
- Raghavan, T.C.A. (2018). Attendant Lords: Bairam Khan and Abdur Rahim, Courtiers and Poets in Mughal India. HarperCollins.
- Nahar, Vijay (2011). हिंडुआ सूरज मेवाड़ रतन [Hindua Suraj Mewar Ratan] (in Hindi). Jaipur, Rajasthan: Pinkcity Publishers. ISBN 978-93-80522-45-6.
- Sharma, G. N. (1990), Mewar and the Mughal Emperors (1526-1707 A.D.), Shiva Lal Agarwala

Maharana Pratap Rana of Mewar Born: 18 May 1540 Died: 19 January 1597
Preceded by Udai Singh II	Rana of Mewar; 1572–1597	Succeeded by Amar Singh I
