= Ek Mutthi Aasmaan (TV series) =

Indian television series

- Genre: Drama
- Created by: DJ's a Creative Unit
- Written by: Satyam Tripathi; Shilpa Choubay; Sushil Choubay; Dheeraj Sarna; Damini Kanwal Shetty
- Directed by: Hemant Prabhu; Abhimanyu Chauhan Rajesh Sharma
- Starring: Rachana Parulkar; Asha Negi; Ashish Chaudhary; Shilpa Shirodkar; Shireena Sambyal
- Country of origin: India
- Original language: Hindi
- No. of seasons: 1

Production
- Producers: Tony Singh; Deeya Singh
- Editors: Santosh Singh; Pradeep Singh
- Camera setup: Multi camera
- Running time: 25 minutes
- Production company: DJ's a Creative Unit

Original release
- Network: Zee TV
- Release: August 26, 2013 – September 12, 2014

Ek Mutthi Aasmaan (transl. A Fistful of Sky) is an Indian family drama television series. It aired on Zee TV, then it was replaced by Bandhan.

== Plot summary ==
Ek Mutthi Aasmaan follows the story of Kalpana "Kalpi" Jadhav and Raghav Singhania, as their paths cross on a journey of self improvement. Kalpi is the daughter of a maid, Kamla Jadhav, and a mill worker, Vitthal Jadhav (Mohit Dagga). Her mother's dream is to become a part of the middle class so she works tirelessly. Kalpana selflessly loves her mother, but is deprived of her love and attention because Kamla is always busy looking after family members of her employers, mostly Pakhi Kapoor (Shirina Singh).

Raghav Singhania is a rich businessman whose mission is to take revenge from the Kapoors who murdered his father. Raghav has always been in debt to Kamla as she helped him escape from the Kapoors who wanted to adopt him and take away all his wealth. He becomes attracted to Kalpi's sweet, simple and caring nature and falls in love with her. Eventually, Kalpana recognizes Raghav's feelings and reciprocates. Raghav and Kalpana fall in love, and with the blessing of their parents, plan their wedding.

On the day of his wedding to Kalpi, Raghav marries Pakhi Kapoor instead. Eventually, Raghav realizes his mistake but cannot rectify it because his mother, Gauri, wants him to use his marriage to Pakhi in her plans against the Kapoors. In order to prove his love for Kalpi, he marries her by putting the sindoor on her forehead in a temple.

Paakhi hires goons to kidnap Kalpi and keep her in a remote location. Later, Raghav learns where Paakhi is hiding Kalpi and rescues her. A car chase ensues in which the car drives off a cliff and blows up. Some fishermen find Kalpi in the river and take her to a hospital; Raghav is still missing. While in the hospital, Dhiraj Diwan is depressed over his niece Suhana's (Asha Negi) death. When he hears how Kalpi's face has been burned and that she has lost her memory, he requests the doctor to perform a plastic surgery procedure to make Kalpi look like Suhana. The surgery is successful. Suhana has flashbacks of her real family, the accident and struggles to believe she is indeed Suhana Diwan.

On the day Suhana is to marry Aryan (Kunal Varma), she realizes that she is Kalpi and she marries Raghav instead.

== Cast ==
- Rachna Parulkar / Asha Negi as Kalpana Raghav Singhania "Kalpi", Raghav's wife and childhood friend
  - Mehnaaz Maan as young Kalpi
- Ashish Chaudhary as Raghav Singhania, Kalpana's husband and childhood friend
  - Yatin Mehta as young Raghav
- Shilpa Shirodhkar as Kamla Vitthal Jadhav, Kalpi's mother
- Mohit Daga as Vitthal Jadhav, Kalpi's father
- Shirina Sambyal as Pakhi Kapoor
  - Avneet Kaur as young Pakhi
- Ashish Nayyar as Sahil Kapoor, Pakhi's father
- Tuhina Vohra as Neetu Kapoor, Pakhi's mother
- Jyoti Gauba as Gauri Singhania, Raghav's mother
- Siddhant Agarwal as Pakhya Jadhav, Kalpi's brother
- Suman Shashi Kant as Manda Tai
- Neeraj Malviya as Prem Kapoor, Pakhi's brother
- Jasmine Avasia as Rajji Kapoor
- Ishaan Singh Manhas as Samar "Sammy" Raizada, Raghav's friend and business partner
- Asha Negi as Suhana Diwan
- Siraj Mustafa Khan as Dheeraj Dhawan, Suhana's brother
- Kajal Pisal as Maya
- Shweta Gautam as Kavita Diwan
- Rohit Sagar as Sanjay Diwan
- Kunal Verma as Aryan, Suhana's love interest
- Ahmad Harhash as Raghav Diwan
