= Saat Phere – Saloni Ka Safar =

Indian drama television series (2005)

- Promotional poster
- Written by: Purnendu Shekhar, Sampurn Anand, Anar Anand, Rajesh Dubey
- Directed by: Rakesh Sarang; Rajan Shahi
- Starring: Rajshree Thakur, Sharad Kelkar
- Music by: Abhijeet Hegdepatil
- Opening theme: "Saat Pheron Mein" by Shreya Ghoshal
- Country of origin: India
- Original language: Hindi
- No. of seasons: 1
- No. of episodes: 854

Production
- Running time: 30 minutes
- Production company: Sphere Origins

Original release
- Network: Zee TV
- Release: 17 October 2005 – 28 May 2009

Saat Phere – Saloni Ka Safar (International title: Saloni) is an Indian Hindi-language drama television series that aired on Zee TV from 17 October 2005 to 28 May 2009. Produced by Sphere Origins, the show starred Rajshree Thakur and Sharad Kelkar. The story focused on issues of social discrimination, especially surrounding skin colour, and was one of Zee TV’s most popular shows in the mid-2000s.

== Plot ==
The series follows Saloni (Rajshree Thakur), a young woman who faces prejudice due to her dark skin tone. Despite societal challenges, she strives to build her own identity and lead a fulfilling life through her talent of singing. Saloni marries Nahar (Sharad Kelkar) and navigates the struggles of marriage and family responsibilities while confronting social biases and various external enemies who want to harm her family.

Later in the series, following a generation leap, the focus shifts to Saloni's daughter Savri, who encounters her own challenges before the family is ultimately reunited.

== Cast ==
=== Main ===
- Rajshree Thakur as Saloni Singh – Narpat and Ambika's elder daughter; Shubhra and Samar's sister; Kalika's half-sister; Nahar's widow; Savri's mother; Shweta's adoptive mother (2005–2009)
- Sharad Kelkar as
  - Nahar Singh – Abhay's younger son; Bhabho's adopted son; Brijesh, Aditi and Piya's brother; Saloni's husband; Savri's father; Shweta's adoptive father (2005–2008) (Dead)
  - Swami Amrit – Nahar's lookalike; Gurumaa's son; Saloni's friend; Savri and Shweta's foster father (2008–2009)

=== Recurring ===
- Raqesh Bapat as Neel / Neerav – Saloni's childhood friend and ex-lover; Shubhra's ex-husband; Nishi's husband (2005–2008)
- Mohan Bhandari as Narpat Singh – Narendra's brother; Ambika's husband; Shyama's ex-lover; Saloni, Shubhra, Samar and Kalika's father (2005–2009)
- Pratichi Mishra as Ambika Singh – Narpat's wife; Saloni, Shubhra and Samar's mother (2005–2009)
- Prithvi Zutshi as Narendra Singh – Narpat's brother; Manno's husband; Abhi's father (2006–2007)
- Neena Gupta as Manorama "Manno" Singh – Narendra's wife; Abhi's mother (2005–2009)
- Poonam Gulati as Shubhra Singh – Narpat and Ambika's younger daughter; Saloni and Samar's sister; Kalika's half-sister; Neel's ex-wife; Kunjan's wife (2005–2008)
- Chetanya Adib as Kunjan Singh – Shubhra's husband (2005–2008)
- Anand Suryavanshi / Mazher Sayed as Samar Singh – Narpat and Ambika's son; Saloni and Shubhra's brother; Kalika's half-brother; Kaveri's husband; Kamini's father; Nikita's adoptive father (2005–2009)
- Aanchal Dwiwedi as Kaveri Chaudhary Singh – Samar's wife; Kamini's mother; Nikita's adoptive mother (2005–2009)
- Surekha Sikri as Mrs. Singh aka Bhabho – Abhay's wife; Brijesh, Aditi, Nahar and Piya's adoptive mother; Aditya, Ishaan, Savri and Shweta's adoptive grandmother (2005–2009)
- Bharat Kaul as Abhay Singh – Bhabho's husband; Brijesh, Aditi, Nahar and Piya's father; Aditya, Ishaan and Savri's grandfather; Shweta's adoptive grandfather (2007)
- Ahmed Khan as Mr. Singh – Abhay's father; Brijesh, Aditi, Nahar and Piya's grandfather (2007)
- Akshay Anand as Brijesh Singh – Abhay's elder son; Bhabho's adopted son; Aditi, Nahar and Piya's brother; Urvashi's ex-husband; Tara's husband; Aditya's father (2005–2009)
- Ashlesha Sawant as Tara Singh – Maasa's step-daughter; Urvashi's step-sister; Brijesh's second wife; Aditya's adoptive mother (2005–2009)
- Nivedita Bhattacharya as Urvashi Singh – Maasa's daughter; Tara's step-sister; Brijesh's ex-wife; Veer's wife; Aditya's mother (2006–2009)
- Aditi Pratap as Aditi Singh – Abhay's elder daughter; Bhabho's adopted daughter; Brijesh, Nahar and Piya's sister; Dheer's wife; Ishaan's mother (2005–2007)
- Ashish Kapoor as Dheer – Aditi's husband; Ishaan's father (2005–2009)
- Amrita Prakash as Piya Singh – Abhay's younger daughter; Bhabho's adopted daughter; Brijesh, Aditi and Nahar's sister; Shridhar's ex-wife; Shekhar's wife (2005–2006)
- Amit Dolawat as Shridhar – Piya's ex-husband (2007)
- Sachin Shroff as Shekhar Sharma / Fake Abhi – Manno and Narendra's fake son; Piya's second husband (2007)
- Rachana Parulkar as Savri Singh – Saloni and Nahar's daughter; Amrit's foster daughter; Shweta's adopted sister; Aditya, Ishaan and Kamini's cousin; Nikita's adopted cousin; Daksh's wife (2009)
  - Ulka Gupta as Child Savri Singh (2009)
- Amrapali Dubey as Shweta Singh – Saloni and Nahar's adopted daughter; Amrit's foster daughter; Savri's adopted sister; Aditya, Ishaan, Kamini and Nikita's adopted cousin; Aman's ex-fiancée; Rajveer's wife (2009)
  - Hiba Nawab as Child Shweta Singh (2009)
- Ali Merchant as Rajveer – Shweta's husband (2009)
- Puneet Sachdev as Aman – Shweta's ex-fiancé (2009)
- Aham Sharma as Aditya Singh – Brijesh and Urvashi's son; Tara's adopted son; Ishaan and Savri's cousin; Shweta's adopted cousin (2009)
- Shalini Kapoor as Madhu (2009)
- Gaurav Vaish as Ishaan – Dheer and Aditi's son; Aditya and Savri's cousin; Shweta's adopted cousin (2005–2009)
- Keerti Gaekwad Kelkar as
  - Chandni Singh, Padam Singh's daughter /
  - Devika Nahar Singh, Nahar's ex-wife (2006–2007)
- Sachin Sharma as Dev, Chandni's husband (2007)
- Meenakshi Verma as Padma Gajpratap Singh – Shubhra's mother-in-law, Kunjan's mother (2005–2008)
- Tej Sapru as Gajpratap Singh – Shubhra's father-in-law, Kunjan's father (2007–2008)
- Apara Mehta as Kuki Veer Singh (antagonist) – Brijesh, Aditi, Nahar and Piya's aunt, Veer's ex-wife, Kshitij's mother (2006–2008)
- Sadiya Siddiqui as Gayatri Singh – Saloni's paternal aunt, Dhananjay's wife (2005–2007)
- Sachin Khurana as Dhananjay – Gayatri's husband (2005–2007)
- Nattasha Singh as Juhi (2006)
- Shaleen Bhanot as Karan (antagonist) – Shubhra's boyfriend (2005–2006)
- Farida Dadi as Maa Sa – Tara's stepmother, Urvashi's mother (2006–2008)
- Akshay Sethi as Yug (2006–2007)
- Aastha Chaudhary as Urmila Singh – Padam Singh's illegitimate daughter (2007)
- Jasveer Kaur as Katari (2006)
- Narendra Gupta as Aapji – Neel's grandfather (2005–2006)
- Vineet Kumar – Kaveri's father
- Sharmilee Raj as Chamki (2007)
- Barkha Madan as Reva Sehgal – Brijesh, Aditi, Nahar and Piya's stepsister (2006–2007)
- Shahbaz Khan as Padam Singh (antagonist) – Chandni, Devika and Urmila's father (2007)
- Shweta Kawatra as Reva Sehgal – Brijesh, Aditi, Nahar and Piya's stepsister (2005)
- Sonika Sahay as Ginni – Nikita's mother (2007–2008)
- Gunjan Walia as Vrinda – Dheer's second wife and Ishaan's stepmother (2007–2008)
- Niyati Joshi as Piya Singh – Brijesh, Aditi and Nahar's younger sister, Shridhar's ex-wife, fake Abhi / Shekhar's wife (2006–2009)
- Poonam Joshi as Dr. Nishi – Neel's second wife, Brigadier and Shanti's former daughter-in-law (2007–2008)
- Mahru Sheikh as Shanti – Brigadier's wife, Dr. Nishi's mother-in-law (2007–2008)
- Rajeev Verma as Brigadier, Shanti's husband, Dr. Nishi's father-in-law (2007–2008)
- Pracheen Chauhan as Kshitij Singh – Nahar and Brijesh's cousin, Veer and Kuki's son, Kalika's husband (2008)
- Amita Nangia as Shyama Singh – Narpat's girlfriend and Kalika's mother (2008)
- Aashka Goradia as Advocate Kalika Singh / Advocate Kalika Kshitij Singh – Saloni's stepsister, Narpat and Shyama's daughter, Kshitij's Wife, Veer and Kuki's daughter-in-law (2008)
- Pratima Kazmi as Lali Maasi (antagonist) (2008)
- Zahida Parveen as Savitri – Savri's adoptive mother (2008–2009)
- Mihir Mishra as Dr. Varun (antagonist) – Nahar's friend (2008)
- Vishal Watwani as Rohit – Neel's friend (2005–2006)
- Amit Sarin as Advocate Pratap Chauhan (2006)
- Amit Jain as Daksh – Savri's husband, Nahar and Saloni's son-in-law (2009)
- Parikshit Sahni as Veer Singh – Brijesh, Aditi, Nahar and Piya's uncle, Kuki's ex-husband, Kshitij's father, Urvashi's husband, Kalika's father-in-law (2007–2008)
- Sonal Pendse as Neelima – Nahar's ex-girlfriend (2006)
- Yusuf Hussain as Shamsher Singh – Tara and Urvashi's father (2006)
- Sonia Singh as Tanya – Samar's secretary (2007)
- Vijay Badlani as Sushant – Shekhar's friend (2007)
- Iira Soni as Kamini Singh – Samar and Kaveri's daughter (2009)
  - Navika Kotia as Child Kamini (2009)
- Sujata Krishnamurthy as Guruma – Swami Amritanand's mother (2008–2009)

== Production ==
In November 2008, production of all Hindi television series, including Saat Phere, was halted following a strike by the Federation of Western India Cine Employees (FWICE). The dispute concerned wages and working conditions. After nearly two weeks of repeat telecasts, the strike was resolved on 19 November 2008 and fresh episodes began airing again from 1 December 2008.

Lead actor Sharad Kelkar was originally signed for 30 episodes but continued due to the popularity of his character. He eventually quit in 2009 but returned for the final episode. Rajshree Thakur also left the series during its generation leap. In April 2009, the show introduced new storylines featuring Saloni’s children.

Despite strong early ratings, the leap failed to revive viewership, leading Zee TV to end the show in May 2009.

== Reception ==
=== Critical response ===
India Today described the show’s plot as "simple" but noted its role in boosting Zee TV’s ratings in the mid-2000s.

=== Ratings ===
The show opened with ratings around 2 TVR and steadily climbed, reaching above 6 TVR in 2006, making it one of the most-watched Hindi serials at the time. Ratings later declined after the generation leap, leading to its conclusion in May 2009.
