= Appnapan – Badalte Rishton Ka Bandhan =

Indian television series

- Genre: Indian soap opera
- Created by: Ekta Kapoor
- Developed by: Ekta Kapoor
- Written by: Jaya Misra; Anjali Bahura
- Screenplay by: Tapasya Udayawar
- Directed by: Jitu Arora; Shivendra Mishra
- Creative directors: Tanushri Dasgupta; Palki Malhotra
- Starring: Cezanne Khan; Rajshree Thakur
- Theme music composer: Lalit Sen; Nawab Arzoo
- Country of origin: India
- Original language: Hindi
- No. of seasons: 1
- No. of episodes: 113

Production
- Producers: Ekta Kapoor; Shobha Kapoor
- Editors: Vikas Sharma; Vishal Sharma; Manas Majumder
- Camera setup: Multi-camera
- Running time: 24 minutes
- Production company: Balaji Telefilms

Original release
- Network: Sony Entertainment Television
- Release: 15 June – 18 November 2022

Appnapan – Badalte Rishton Ka Bandhan (transl. Kinship – relation of changing relationship) is an Indian Hindi-language television drama series that aired from 15 June 2022 to 18 November 2022 on Sony Entertainment Television. Produced by Ekta Kapoor under Balaji Telefilms, it featured Cezanne Khan and Rajshree Thakur in the lead roles.

== Plot ==
After their separation, Pallavi and Nikhil raised their children alone. Nikhil raises Harsh and Manna, while Pallavi raises Barkha, Gagan, and Badal. However, despite their best efforts, they have not been able to overcome the absence of the other parent in their children's lives.

Fifteen years later, the two families meet when Nikhil returns to India, knowing that Barkha's marriage is arranged with Ishaan Agarwal. Understanding that Pallavi will not appreciate Nikhil's presence at the wedding, he returns to New York but sends money to Barkha as he is aware of Pallavi's financial situation. Barkha returns the money through Gagan, whom Harsh later accuses of stealing the money with the intention of troubling Pallavi for leaving him as a child.

Initially, the children are at odds with each other and their parents, but they resolve their misunderstandings and reunite. Persuaded by Nikhil's mother and the children, Pallavi and Nikhil decide to remarry. However, their happiness is short-lived due to the arrival of Pallavi's cousin Sonali, who was the cause of Nikhil and Pallavi's separation. Sonali manipulates Pallavi and marries Nikhil.

== Cast ==
=== Main ===
- Cezanne Khan as Nikhil "Nick" Jaisingh – Kinnu's son; Nandita's brother; Pallavi's husband; father to Harsh, Manna, Barkha, and Gagan; and adoptive father to Badal.
- Rajshree Thakur as Pallavi Gulati Jaisingh – Teji's daughter; Nikhil's wife; cousin of Sonali; mother to Harsh, Manna, Barkha, and Gagan; and adoptive mother to Badal.

=== Recurring ===
- Leena Jumani as Sonali Gulati – Pallavi's cousin; Mahesh's ex-wife; Mayank's ex-girlfriend; Badal's mother.
- Anju Mahendru as Teji Gulati – Pallavi's mother; Sonali's aunt; Harsh, Manna, Barkha, and Gagan's grandmother; Badal's adoptive grandmother.
- Farida Dadi as Kinnu Jaisingh – Nikhil and Nandita's mother; Harsh, Manna, Barkha, and Gagan's grandmother; Badal's adoptive grandmother.
- Rinku Dhawan as Nandita Jaisingh – Kinnu's daughter; Nikhil's sister.
- Keshav Mehta as Harsh Jaisingh – Pallavi and Nikhil's elder son; Manna, Barkha, and Gagan's brother; Badal's adoptive brother.
  - Hassaan as Child Harsh Jaisingh.
- Mehak Ghai as Manna Jaisingh – Pallavi and Nikhil's elder daughter; Harsh, Barkha, and Gagan's sister; Badal's adoptive sister; Ishaan's love interest.
  - Aarna Khandelwal as Child Manna Jaisingh.
- Shraddha Tripathi as Barkha Jaisingh – Pallavi and Nikhil's younger daughter; Harsh, Manna, and Gagan's sister; Badal's adoptive sister; Ishaan's ex-fiancée.
  - Aira Keyul Patel as Child Barkha Gulati.
- Gautam Ahuja as Gagan Jaisingh – Pallavi and Nikhil's younger son; Harsh, Manna, and Barkha's brother; Badal's adoptive brother.
- Anmol Kajani as Badal Jaisingh – Sonali and Mayank's son; Pallavi and Nikhil's adoptive son; Harsh, Manna, Barkha, and Gagan's adoptive brother.
- Jatin Shah as Ranveer – Pallavi's friend who had a crush on her.
- Suvansh Dhar / Shubham Dipta as Ishaan Agarwal – Nimmi's nephew; Barkha's ex-fiancé; Manna's love interest.
- Mrinalini Tyagi as Lalita – Pallavi's friend.
- Jay Zaveri as Shanky – Nikhil's friend.
- Mridula Oberoi as Nimmi Agarwal – Ishaan's aunt.
- Madhubala Atri as Bitti - Gagan's friend.
- Unknown as Mayank – Sonali's ex-boyfriend; Badal's father.

== Production ==
=== Casting ===
Rajshree Thakur and Cezzane Khan were selected to play the lead roles. Thakur portrayed Pallavi, while Khan portrayed Nikhil.

Shraddha Tripathi and Mehak Ghai made their acting debut as Thakur and Khan's daughters, respectively. Mridula Oberoi was cast as the antagonist.

In September 2022, Leena Jumani was cast in the antagonist role.

=== Release ===
The promos for Appnapan – Badalte Rishton Ka Bandhan were released in February 2022. It premiered on 15 June 2022 on Sony Entertainment Television.

== Crossover ==
Appnapan – Badalte Rishton Ka Bandhan and Bade Achhe Lagte Hain 2 joined forces for an integration week, known as "Mahasangam Saptah". The episodes focused on the wedding ceremonies of Bade Achhe's characters, Vikrant and Sara, held in Meerut.

== Awards and nominations ==
Year	Award	Category	Recipient	Result	Ref.
2022	Indian Television Academy Awards	Best Actress (Drama)	Rajshree Thakur	Nominated	
2022	Indian Television Academy Awards	Popular Actor (Drama)	Cezanne Khan	Nominated	
2022	Indian Television Academy Awards	Popular Serial (Drama)	Appnapan – Badalte Rishton Ka Bandhan	Nominated	

== See also ==
- List of programs broadcast by Sony Entertainment Television
