= Phool Bai Rathore =

Fifth wife of Maharana Pratap

- Rajkumari of Marwar
- Born: Jodhpur, Marwar
- Spouse: Maharana Pratap
- Issue: Chanda Singh; Shekha Singh
Names
- Rani Phool Kanwar Rathore
- Dynasty: Rathore (by birth); Sisodia (by marriage)
- Father: Ramchandra Rathore
- Religion: Hinduism

Phool Bai Rathore (lit. 'Flower'), also known as Rani Phool Bai, was the fifth wife of Maharana Pratap, the 13th Rana of the Kingdom of Mewar. Phool Bai was the mother of Chanda Singh and Shekha Singh.

== Early life ==
Phool Bai was born into the Rathore family of Marwar. She was the granddaughter of Marwar's ruler Maldeo Rathore and the daughter of Ramchandra Rathore. She was also the niece of Chandrasen Rathore

== Marriage and children ==
Phool Bai was married to Maharana Pratap, as a result of a political alliance between Marwar and Mewar, and became his fifth wife. She gave birth to his two sons, Chanda Singh and Shekha Singh. Chanda was given the jagir of Anjana, Shekha was given the jagir of Bera and Nana.

== In popular culture ==
- In the 2015 series, Bharat Ka Veer Putra – Maharana Pratap, Phool Bai was portrayed by Jannat Zubair Rahmani and Heena Parmar.
