= Bas Itna Sa Khwaab =

2024 Hindi language television series

- Genre: social issue family drama
- Written by: Agastaya Jain; Priya Ramnathan; Vishakha Peeyush
- Screenplay by: Lakshmi Jaykumar
- Starring: Rajshree Thakur; Yogendra Singh
- Country of origin: India
- Original language: Hindi
- No. of episodes: 130

Production
- Producer: Zee Studios
- Production locations: Kanpur; Mumbai
- Camera setup: Multi-camera
- Running time: 22 minutes
- Production company: Zee Studios

Original release
- Network: Zee TV
- Release: 3 December 2024 – 13 April 2025

Related
- Tu Chal Pudha

Bas Itna Sa Khwaab (transl. Just a small dream) is an Indian Hindi language drama television series that premiered from 3 December 2024 on Zee TV. It is produced under Zee Studios and it stars Rajshree Thakur and Yogendra Singh. It is the remake of Zee Marathi's TV series Tu Chal Pudha.

== Plot ==
The story revolves around Avani, an ideal housewife and a perfect mother, and what she does for her family. The family has a dream of buying a luxury home one day and are working hard for the sake of it. Avani also wishes to contribute her part to accomplishing their dream, but the family members are skeptical of her decision and believe that she cannot work and make money. However, Avani does not back off from her opinion and opens a beauty parlor. She starts earning money and becomes an independent woman.

== Cast ==
=== Main ===
- Rajshree Thakur as Avani Trivedi: Shikhar's wife; Anika and Kittu's mother (2024–2025)
- Yogendra Vikram Singh as Shikhar Trivedi: Ashok and Suman's son; Shagun's brother; Tamanna's boyfriend: Avani's husband; Anika and Kittu's father (2024–2025)

=== Recurring ===
- Bhumika Gurung as Shagun Trivedi: Ashok and Suman's daughter; Shikhar's sister; Vidyut's wife; Krish's mother (2024–2025)
- Sandeep Sharma as Vidyut Sharma: Shagun’s husband; Avni's brother; Krish’s father (2024–2025)
- Raanav Sharma as Krish Sharma: Shagun and Vidyut's son (2024–2025)
- Isha Dheerwani as Anika Trivedi: Avani and Shikhar's elder daughter; Kittu's sister (2024–2025)
- Veronica Sharma as Kittu Trivedi: Avani and Shikhar's younger daughter; Anika's sister (2024–2025)
- Samta Sagar as Suman Trivedi: Ashok's wife; Shikhar and Shagun's mother; Anika, Kittu and Krish's grandmother (2024–2025)
- Jairoop Jeevan as Ashok Trivedi: Suman's husband; Shikhar and Shagun's father; Anika, Kittu and Krish's grandfather (2024–2025)
- Soneer Vadhera as Sandeep Jaiswal (2024)
- Prity Sahani as Isha Jaiswal: Sandeep's niece (2024)
- Milan Dhamecha as Delivery Guy (2025)
- Chhavi Pandey as Tamanna: Shikhar's lover (2025)

== Production ==
=== Casting ===
Rajshree Thakur was cast in the titular role of Avani Trivedi while Yogendra Singh was cast as Avani's husband Shikhar Trivedi. Bhumika Gurung was roped in as Shagun Trivedi, Shikhar's sister thus marking her debut in a negative role.

=== Filming ===
The show shot for its initial episodes in Kanpur.

== Adaptations ==
Language	Title	Original Release	Network(s)	Last aired	Notes
Marathi	Tu Chal Pudha तू चाल पुढं	15 August 2022	Zee Marathi	13 January 2024	Original
Hindi	Bas Itna Sa Khwaab बस इतना सा ख़्वाब	3 December 2024	Zee TV	13 April 2025	Remake
