= Noyontara =

Indian supernatural television series

- Genre: Drama; Supernatural
- Created by: Nissar Parvez; Alind Srivastava
- Starring: Shruti Bhist; Arjun Chakrabarty; Heena Parmar; Shubham Dipta; Sakshi Sharma
- Composer: Raja Narayan Deb
- Country of origin: India
- Original language: Hindi
- No. of seasons: 2
- No. of episodes: 312

Production
- Producers: Sahana; Rohit Samanta; Alind Srivastava; Nissar Parvez
- Production location: Kolkata
- Camera setup: Multi-camera
- Running time: 21 minutes
- Production companies: Peninsula Pictures; Missing Screw

Original release
- Network: Colors TV
- Release: 9 June 2025 – 16 April 2026

Related
- Trinayani

Noyontara is an Indian Hindi-language television supernatural series that aired on Colors TV from 9 June 2025 to 16 April 2026 on Colors TV and streams digitally on JioHotstar. Produced by Peninsula Pictures, the show starred Shruti Bhist, Arjun Chakrabarty, Shubham Dipta, Sakshi Sharma and Heena Parmar. It was an official remake of Bengali TV series Trinayani.

== Plot ==
Noyontara, a 23-year-old ghost-whisperer has always lived on the fringes, ridiculed for her rare gift. Her life takes a drastic turn when she marries Dr. Surjo, a man of science and reason, still wallowing in guilt over his tragic past. When Noyontara enters Surjo's house, the grand and enigmatic Pari Mahal, she’s pulled into a web of secrets where the past refuses to stay buried. With a playful and mischievous ghost named Hasiram as her unlikely ally, she begins to unravel the ancestral mansion’s history of greed and forgotten truths. She encounters two women — Lata and Lalita — both claiming to be her mother-in-law. Lalita urges her to save her son, Surjo, from a fate worse than death, while Lata seeks to manipulate Noyontara’s gift for her own sinister agenda. As their intentions blur, Noyontara must decide: who is guiding her and who is leading her into a trap?

== Cast ==
=== Main ===
- Shruti Bhist as
  - Noyontara "Noyon" Sengupta: Meghnath and Karuna's daughter (2025–2026) (Dead)
    - Myrah Shivan as child Noyontara (2025)
  - Noyontara "Tara" Basu: Surjoshekhar and Noyontara Sengupta's daughter (2026)
- Arjun Chakrabarty as Surjoshekhar "Surjo" Sengupta: Shashodhar and Lolita's son (2025–2026) (Dead)
  - Akshaan Sehrawat as child Surjoshekhar (2025)
- Heena Parmar as Shaoli Roy: A ghost; Madhobi's daughter; Nishi's mother (2025–2026) (Dead)
- Shubham Dipta as Prateek Basu: A Businessman; Noyontara Basu's husband (2026)
- Sakshi Sharma as Nishi Roy: Shaoli's satanic daughter (2026)

=== Recurring ===
- Naveen Saini as Meghnath: Karuna's husband (2025)
- Bidisha Ghosh Sharma as Karuna: Meghnath's wife (2025)
- Shreya Choudhary as Komolika aka Komo: Meghnath and Karuna's daughter (2025)
- Romel Raj Krishna as Mohinath: Meghnath and Karuna's son (2025)
- Trisha Goswami as Tonuka aka Phool: Meghnath and Karuna's niece (2025)
- Ankit Chauhan as Gautam: Trisha's brother (2025)
- Hermany Verma as Piyali: Mohinath's wife (2025)
- Chandan Arora as Shayon: Tonuka's husband (2025)
- Muni Jha as Mr. Sengupta: Ashalata's husband (2025)
- Nandini Chatterjee as Ashalata Sengupta: Mr. Sengupta's second wife (2025–2026)
- Vicky Ahuja as Shashodhar Sengupta: Mr. Sengupta's son (2025–2026)
- Kalpesh Rajgor as Chandrashekhar Sengupta: Mr. Sengupta's son (2025)
- Jhumma Mitra as Malobika "Mala" Sengupta: Mr. Sengupta's daughter (2025–2026)
- Moon Banerjee as Paulomi Sengupta: Chandrashekhar's wife (2025)
- Simran Upadhyay as Mohor Sengupta: Shashodhar and Lolita's daughter (2025–2026)
- Divya Wadhwa as Mahua "Mou" Sengupta: Shashodhar and Lolita's daughter (2025)
- Nitya Gupta as Jaya Sengupta: Chandrashekhar and Paulomi's daughter (2025)
- Inderjeet Modi as Shomraj Sengupta: Malobika's son (2025)
- Priyamvada Singh as Madhobi Roy: Shaoli's mother (2025)
- Narayani Shastri as
  - Lolita Sengupta: Ghost; Lata's twin-sister (2025) (Dead)
  - Lata: Lolita's twin-sister and enemy (2025-2026)
- Manoj Chandila as Ajay Ghosh: Trisha's husband (2025)
- Unknown as Trisha Ghosh: Gautam's sister (2025)
- Sudha Chandran as Ghorkamini (2025–2026) (Dead)
- Aamir Dalvi as Baba Pralaynath (2025–2026) (Dead)
- Premchand Singh as Gurudev: Lata's accomplice; Noyontara Sengupta's murderer (2025–2026)
- Farida Dadi as Mrs. Basu: Prateek's grandmother (2026)
- Ragini Kaushik as Deepika Basu (2026)
- Ekta Sharma as Mohima Basu (2026)
- Aditya Chandra as Daksh (2026)
- Rinku Ghosh as Mahamaya (2026)
- Mridun Taksh as Bimal (2025)
- Aqdas Khan as Hashiram: child ghost; Noyontara Sengupta's friend (2025)
- Romanch Mehtha (2025)
- Rajeev Kapoor as Sanjay: Noyontara Sengupta's friend (2025)
- Sulabha Arya as Didabhai: Noyontara Sengupta's grandmother-figure (2025)
- Ragini Kaushik as Bokul: Ghost (2025)

== Production ==
=== Casting ===
Arjun Chakrabarty was selected to playing Dr. Surjo and marks him Hindi TV debut. Narayani Shastri was roped in as Lata and Lalita.

=== Release ===
In May 2025, Colors TV unveiled a teaser introducing the new show titled Noyontara, featuring Shruti Bhist and Adish Vaidya for promoting the series.
