= Rajshree Thakur =

Indian television actress (born 1981)

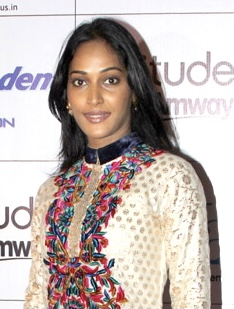
- Rajshree Thakur in 2012
- Born: 22 September 1981 (age 44); Mumbai, Maharashtra, India
- Occupation: Actress
- Years active: 2004–present
- Spouse: Sanjot Vaidya (m. 2007)
- Children: Nyraa Vaidya (daughter)

Rajshree Thakur (born 22 September 1981) is an Indian actress best known for her role as Saloni in the Hindi television drama Saat Phere – Saloni Ka Safar, Jaiwanta Bai in Bharat Ka Veer Putra – Maharana Pratap and Preeti Jindal in Shaadi Mubarak.

== Early life ==
She was born in Mumbai. Before Saat Phere – Saloni Ka Safar, she worked at All India Radio as a Marathi news reader and did ads for companies. Rajshree acted in the Indo-French film Hava Aney Dey directed by Partho Sen-Gupta. As a result, she was selected for the character of Saloni in Saat Phere – Saloni Ka Safar.

== Career ==
Thakur made her film debut in the 2004 movie Hava Aney Dey.

She was awarded the Best Fresh Face of the Year - Female 2006 at the Sixth Indian Telly Awards along with Prachi Desai who stars in Kasamh Se.

Thakur debut in Zee TV's show Saat Phere – Saloni Ka Safar (2005–2009). She also played the role of Maharani Jaiwanta Bai Songara (Maharana Pratap's mother) in Bharat Ka Veer Putra – Maharana Pratap that aired on Sony Entertainment Television.

In August 2020, Thakur portrayed the female lead role of Preeti Jindal in Star Plus‘s Shaadi Mubarak opposite Manav Gohil. She quit the show in October due to hectic schedule. In replacement, Rati Pandey took the role. She was last seen in Appnapan – Badalte Rishton Ka Bandhan.

== Personal life ==
She married her childhood friend Sanjot Vaidya in 2007.

== Filmography ==
=== Films ===
Year	Title	Role	Notes	Ref.
2004	Hava Aney Dey	Salma	Hindi film debut	
2019	Hirkani		Marathi film	

=== Television ===
Year	Serial	Role	Notes
2005–2009	Saat Phere – Saloni Ka Safar	Saloni Singh	Lead Role
2007	Kasamh Se	Guest (as Saloni)	(Special Episode 252)
2008	Banoo Main Teri Dulhann	Guest (as Saloni)	(Special Episode)
2008	Chotti Bahu – Sindoor Bin Suhagan	Guest (as Saloni)	(Special Episode)
2008	Kaho Na Yaar Hai	Contestant	
2008	Ek Se Badhkar Ek	Contestant	
2009	Sapna Babul Ka... Bidaai	Advocate Nishtha Vasudev	Cameo Role
2010	Agle Janam Mohe Bitiya Hi Kijo	Kanchan	Cameo Role
2013–2014; 2015	Bharat Ka Veer Putra – Maharana Pratap	Maharani Jaiwanta Bai Songara	Supporting Role
2020	Shaadi Mubarak	Preeti Jindal	Lead Role
2022	Appnapan – Badalte Rishton Ka Bandhan	Pallavi Gulati	Lead Role
2024–2025	Bas Itna Sa Khwaab	Avani Trivedi	Lead Role

== Awards and nominations ==
Year	Award	show	Notes	Result
2006	Indian Telly Award	Saat Phere – Saloni Ka Safar	Fresh new face female	Won
2006	Indian Television Academy Awards	Saat Phere – Saloni Ka Safar	Ita Award Desh ki Dhadkan-Best Actress Popular	Won
2007	Indian Telly Awards	Saat Phere – Saloni Ka Safar	Best Actress in Lead Role	Won
2014	Indian Telly Awards	Bharat Ka Veer Putra – Maharana Pratap	Best Actress in Supporting Role	Won
2014	Indian Telly Awards	Bharat Ka Veer Putra – Maharana Pratap	Best Actress in Supporting Role(Jury)	Nominated
