= Deepa Parab =

Indian actress

- Occupation: Actress
- Years active: 2002–present
- Spouse: Ankush Chaudhari (m. 2007)
- Children: 1

Deepa Parab is a Marathi and Hindi film and television actress. She currently appears in the television show Tu Chal Pudha as Ashwini Waghmare.

== Acting career ==
She has appeared in Marathi films and serials.

In 2020-2021, she played the role of Aastha Kashyap Sabherwal in StarPlus's Shaurya Aur Anokhi Ki Kahani.

Since August 2022, she is playing the lead role of Ashwini Shreyas Waghmare Zee Marathi's show Tu Chal Pudha

== Personal life ==
She is married to Ankush Chaudhari. The couple has one son.

== Filmography ==
=== Films ===
Year	Movie	Role	Notes
1999	Bindhaast	Mayu's friend	
2002	Maratha Battalion	Trupti	
2004	Chakwa	Janhavi Panse	
2006	Kshan	Nilambari Barve	
2008	Urus	Gauri	
2010	Mulga	Heroine	
2017	Andya Cha Funda	Mother	
2023	Baipan Bhaari Deva	Charu Deshmukh	

=== Television ===
Year	Title	Role	Channel	Ref.
2003	Miit	Aastha & Nupur	Zee TV	
2003	Choti Maa Ek Anokha Bandhan		Zee TV	
2003	Kabhie Kabhie	Anu	StarPlus	
2003	Nayak	Pournima	Alpha TV Marathi	
2005-2006	Reth	Jiya Pandey	Zee TV	
2006	Thodi Khushi Thode Gham	Sneha Shah	Sony TV	
2020–2021	Shaurya Aur Anokhi Ki Kahani	Aastha Shaan Sabharwal	Star Plus	
2022–2024	Tu Chal Pudha	Ashwini Mhatre / Ashwini Shreyas Waghmare	Zee Marathi	
2026–present	Suna Yeti Ghara	Umavati Shirole-Patil / Umavati Shivnath	Star Pravah	
