= Hava Aney Dey =

- Film poster
- Directed by: Partho Sen-Gupta
- Written by: Yogesh Vinayak Joshi (Dialogue)
- Screenplay by: Partho Sen-Gupta
- Story by: Partho Sen-Gupta
- Produced by: Marie-Cécile Destandau, Brij Rathi
- Starring: Aniket Vishwasrao; Nishikant Kamat; Tannishtha Chatterjee; Rajshree Thakur
- Cinematography: Jean-Marc Ferriére
- Music by: Eryck Abecassis
- Release date: 2004
- Running time: 93 minutes
- Countries: France; India
- Language: Hindi

Hava Aney Dey (English: Let the Wind Blow) is a 2004 Indian Hindi-language drama film written and directed by Partho Sen-Gupta. It stars Aniket Vishwasrao, Nishikant Kamat, Tannishtha Chatterjee and Rajshree Thakur in the lead roles. The film was shot on location in the northern suburbs (Vikhroli and Andheri East) of Mumbai, India, in October–November 2003 with a mixed crew composed of French and Indian technicians. It is an Indo-French co-production between Santocha Productions, Paris, Mystique Media Ltd, Mumbai and Independent Movies LTD, Mumbai. It was also funded partly by the Fonds Sud, of the French Foreign Ministry and the French Cultural Ministry. It was post-produced partly in Mumbai and Paris.

== Plot ==
"India is in the throes of the new global economy. The new capitalist order is changing people’s lives. But a new war of ideals is separating the old values from the new… There is also the war with Pakistan… the two brothers who are fighting for Kashmir. The two countries have equipped themselves with Oppenheimer’s deadly toy."

Arjun (Aniket Vishwasrao), 18 years old, lives in the northern suburbs of Bombay with his widowed mother Sheela, who works hard to make ends meet. She has one goal in life: that Arjun gets a diploma and a good job. Arjun is attracted to Salma (Rajshree Thakur), a girl from a Muslim upper-class family. Arjun knows that she is beyond his reach.

Chabia (Nishikant Kamat), 21 years old, is Arjun's best friend and a mechanic in a garage. Chabia loves Mona (Tannishtha Chatterjee), a dancer in a cabaret bar. Chabia hates seeing the rich men showering her with money as she dances for them. She wants to go and work in Dubai.

Rohit, a rich young man, brings his BMW car to service it in Chabia's garage. Chabia fixes his car with cheap spares that he has procured from dubious sources.

Rohit is happy and invites Chabia for a drink in a posh club in downtown Bombay. Chabia thinks that this is an opportunity to meet upper-class people. But things turn out badly for him and the bouncers beat him up. Rohit does not help.

Tensions on the Pakistan border increase, and the military build-up intensifies. Both countries test their intercontinental ballistic missiles.

Chabia steals money from his brother and plans to run away with Mona and start a new life. But she hesitates at the last minute and goes to work in the cabarets of Dubai. Arjun fails his diploma examination as he tries to cheat using fake papers that Chabia procured for him. The two friends want to do something to leave this climate of despair.

An old friend returns from abroad with stories of his fortunes. He was going to retire in a few years. He had made his money. Chabia tries to convince Arjun to go abroad with him, but Arjun does not want to leave his mother alone. Chabia and Arjun decide to meet an employment agent who promises them jobs for a huge fee. Chabia arranges his fee, but Arjun cannot manage his. Chabia tells him to ask his mother Sheela to lend him the money. At first, Sheela is very angry but succumbs to her son's demand.

The day before their departure, they celebrate their farewell. The mood is upbeat. However, India and Pakistan destroy each other's major cities with nuclear bombs.

== Cast ==
- Aniket Vishwasrao as Arjun
- Nishikant Kamat as Chabia
- Tannishtha Chatterjee as Mona
- Rajshree Thakur as Salma
- Hridaynath Jadhav as Anil
- Yogesh Vinayak Joshi as Yogi
- Chinmay Kelkar as Sanju
- Tejas D. Parvatkar as Sudhir
- Deepak Qazir as Employment Agent
- Niaal Saad as Rohit
- Pubali Sanyal as Illa
- Ganesh Yadav as Sudhakar

== Production credits ==
- Story and direction: Partho Sen-Gupta
- Screenplay and dialogues: Yogesh Vinayak Joshi & Partho Sen-Gupta
- Producer: Marie-Cécile Destandau
- Executive producer: Rakesh Mehra
- Co-producer: Brij Rathi
- Original music by Eryck Abecassis
- Cinematography by Jean-Marc Ferriére
- Film editing by Annick Raoul
- Casting by Yogesh Vinayak Joshi
- Production design by Agnes Vergne
- Sound designer: Nikolas Javelle
- Location sound: Jacques Sans
- Re-recordist: Nathalie Vidal

== Distribution and reception ==
It premièred at the Berlinale (Berlin International Film Festival) in 2004 and won awards at other important international film festivals.

Hava Aney Dey is part of the Global Film Initiative's Global Lens 2008 Film Lineup of ten award-winning narrative, feature films from Argentina, China, Croatia, India, Indonesia, Iran, Lebanon, Philippines and South Africa. Global Lens 2008, its fifth year, premièred at the Museum of Modern Art, (MOMA) New York City in January, before embarking on a year-long tour of over 30 cities across the United States.

The Indian Film Censor Board refused to give it a release certificate without a long list of sound and picture cuts reducing about 20 minutes of the film. The director refused to accept the censor decision, as it would destroy the film with the abrupt cuts and sound mutes. It was never released in India.

The film was never officially screened in India as it was pulled out at the last minute (despite the selection by the festival) from the Cinefan film festival in New Delhi in 2005 by the censors. Indian filmmakers, artists, writers opposed to censorship continue to fight for the freedom to express themselves.

== Film festival selections and awards ==
=== Awards ===
- Best Film Award (Durban International Film Festival)
- BBC Audience Award (Commonwealth Film Festival)
- Special Jury Mention (Hong Kong International Film Festival)

=== Selections ===
- 2004 Berlin International Film Festival
- 2004 Hong Kong International Film Festival
- 2004 Commonwealth Film Festival, Manchester, United Kingdom
- 2004 Durban International Film Festival Durban, South Africa
- 2004 3rd Eye Asian Film Festival Mumbai, India
- 2004 Tokyo Filmex
- 2004 3 continents Film Festival, (Nantes, France)
- 2004 River to River Indian Film Festival, Florence, Italy
- 2008 International Film Festival Rotterdam, Rotterdam, Netherlands

== See also ==
- Censorship in India
