= Anjaan: Special Crimes Unit =

Indian Horror Mystery TV series

- Promotional poster
- Genre: Horror; Drama
- Written by: Venkatraman Subramaniam; Sneha Kamath; Nishant Chaturvedi; Hitesh Bali; Priyali Saxena; Kunal Valecha; Jitesh R
- Directed by: Various
- Creative director: Pratim Rai
- Starring: Gashmeer Mahajani; Heena Parmar
- Music by: Bharatt-Saurabh
- Country of origin: India
- Original language: Hindi
- No. of seasons: 1
- No. of episodes: 65

Production
- Producers: Vikram Rai; Bhuvanesh Shrivastava
- Camera setup: Multi-camera
- Running time: 45 minutes
- Production company: Lotus Talkies Productions Private Limited

Original release
- Network: Discovery Jeet
- Release: 12 February – 11 May 2018

Anjaan: Special Crimes Unit is an Indian paranormal investigative crime horror television series, which airs on Discovery JEET. It features Heena Parmar and Gashmeer Mahajani in lead roles. They investigate crime cases, that are connected to the supernatural. The show premiered on 12 February 2018.

== Plot ==
The series shows the journey of ACP Vikrant Singhal who is after a gangster named Vanraaj. Many people believe Vanraaj to be an evil spirit. Vikrant is a logical and level headed police officer, who does not believe in ghosts, his junior officer ACP Shivani Joglekar can see paranormal species. They are paired together at an abandoned police station of Mumbai Police - Shaitan Chowki, which is full of unsolved case files. Shivani's deceased elder brother Shiddhant Joglekar was killed mysteriously with bullet wounds with no bullets. Shivani and Vikrant find out that Siddhant was in charge of Vanraaj's investigation and they try to link these cases.

Meanwhile, they are called for another mysterious cases which are linked to certain files from Shaitan Chowski. The paranormal species that were wronged in their lives try to contact Shivani in order to get justice. Vikrant and Shivani are thus called to solve series of unsolved cases from other police stations as well. In between Vikrant gets glimpses of information regarding Vanraaj, and every time he fails to catch him. All they have is a mysterious symbol from Brahmi script. Vanraaj kills Shivani on night, and Vikrant decides to avenge her murder. He finds a link between the symbol and an orphanage in Rajasthan and heads there. There he meets Aditi Sharma, who is an Delhi-based ASP. Like Shivani, Aditi is also capable of seeing paranormal species, she is sent by Shivani's spirit to save Vikrant.

The orphanage was abandoned since 20 years but Aditi finds an old photograph of four small kids including herself. Her father tells her that she was adopted from an orphanage in Bengaluru, where she was shifted after a massive fire accident in the orphanage in Rajasthan. Determine to solve the mystery, she and Vikrant decide to get her transferred from Delhi to Mumbai.

The episodes are based on unsolved case stories that are solved by Vikrant and Aditi. The link to Vanraaj and the orphanage reveals slowly through the episodes in parallel. In the season finale, Aditi finds out that in the photograph of the four kids was of herself with Siddhant and Shivani who are her siblings. These four are destined to protect the one who can destroy the evil that is Vanraaj. This person is meant to be Vikrant, who is pulled into the portal to another world by Vanraaj leaving Aditi alone.

== Cast ==
- Gashmeer Mahajani as ACP Vikrant Singhal
- Heena Parmar as ASP Aditi Sharma
- Cherry Mardia as ACP Shivani Joglekar
- Sanjay Gurbaxani as DCP Suresh Dutt
- Vasudha Mahadevan as Shivani's Mother
- Abigail Jain as Annanya
- Pavitra Goregaonkar as Midwife
- Melissa Pais as Suman

== See also ==
- List of Hindi horror shows
