= Maharanas: A Thousand Year War for Dharma =

2022 Book by Omendra Ratnu

Maharanas: A Thousand-Year War for Dharma
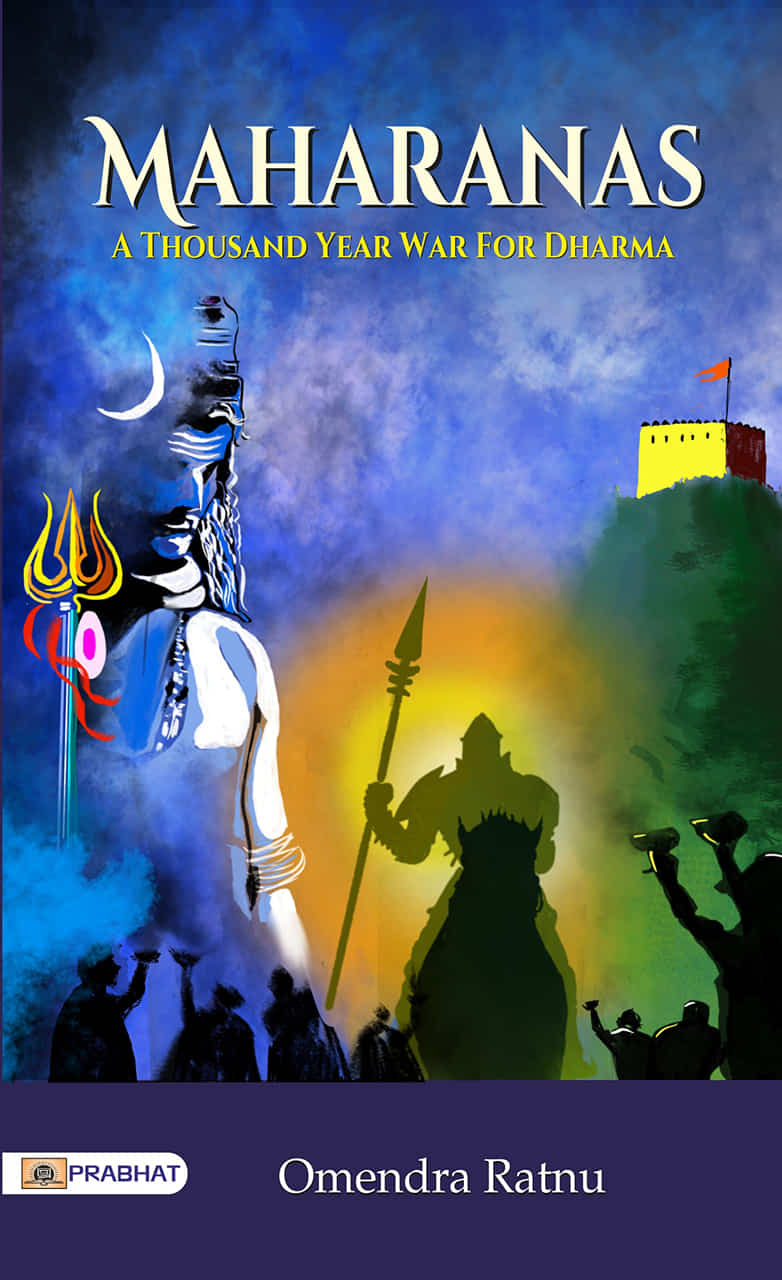
- Book cover
- Author: Omendra Ratnu
- Language: Hindi; English
- Genre: Non-fiction
- Publisher: Prabhat Prakashan
- Publication date: 2022; 2023
- Publication place: India
- Media type: Print (hardcover and paperback)
- Pages: 399
- ISBN: 9789355211644

Maharanas: A Thousand-Year War for Dharma is a 2022 historical non-fiction book written by Omendra Ratnu that chronicles the military and civilizational resistance of the Sisodia dynasty of Mewar.

== Content ==
=== Plot ===
The core thesis of the book focuses on what the author describes as a thousand-year conflict to preserve Sanatan Dharma (Hindu traditions and culture) against foreign territorial and religious expansion.

=== Sisodiya dynasty ===
The narrative traces the lineage of the rulers of Mewar—from foundational figures like Bappa Rawal to later rulers such as Maharana Kumbha, Maharana Sanga, and Maharana Pratap.

=== Civilizational resistance ===
The author frames the military campaigns of the Mewar rulers not merely as geopolitical battles for territory, but as an existential civilizational resistance. It highlights their choice to endure hardships or exile rather than capitulate to imperial powers.

=== Revisionist historiography ===
A central objective of the text is to challenge established colonial and leftist historiographies in India. The author argues that mainstream historical narratives have deliberately minimized or "whitewashed" the strategic successes, sacrifices, and military heritage of the Rajput rulers.

== Reception ==
It presents a fresh and impartial analysis of medieval Indian history. Centered on the indomitable Ranas of Mewar—from the illustrious Sisodia dynasty.

the book challenges traditional historical narratives by also incorporating the sacrifices and strategic struggles of the Rajput states.
