= Rachana Parulkar =

Indian television actress (born 1990)

- Born: 10 October 1990 (age 35); Bombay, Maharashtra, India
- Occupations: Actress; dancer
- Years active: 2009– present
- Known for: Saat Phere – Saloni Ka Safar; Ek Mutthi Aasmaan; Bharat Ka Veer Putra – Maharana Pratap

Rachana Parulkar is an Indian actress who works in Hindi television. She made her acting debut in 2009 with Saat Phere – Saloni Ka Safar portraying Savri Singh. Parulkar is best known for her portrayal of Kalpana Jadhav Singhania in Ek Mutthi Aasmaan and Maharani Ajabde Punwar in Bharat Ka Veer Putra – Maharana Pratap.

== Personal life ==
Parulkar is a trained Kathak dancer and a student of Uma Dogra. She completed her training from Uma Dogra's School of Kathak.

== Career ==
Parulkar made her acting debut in 2009 with Saat Phere – Saloni Ka Safar portraying Savri Singh. She then appeared as Rano in Kis Desh Mein Hai Meraa Dil, the same year.

From 2010 to 2012, she portrayed Akruti in Sapnon Se Bhare Naina alongside Dishank Arora. In 2012, she appeared in an episode of Gumrah as Kanak Dagar.

Parulkar portrayal of Kalpana "Kalpi" Jadhav Singhania in Ek Mutthi Aasmaan opposite Ashish Chaudhary from 2013 to 2014, proved as a major turning point in her career.

Parulkar achieved further success with her portrayal of Maharani Ajabde Punwar opposite Sharad Malhotra in Bharat Ka Veer Putra – Maharana Pratap from 2014 to 2015.

In 2019, she portrayed Parvati in Namah alongside Tarun Khanna. She also appeared in an uncredited role in Gunjan Saxena: The Kargil Girl.

From 2022 to 2023, she portrayed Shivani Pawar in Maddam Sir.

== Media image ==
In UK-based newspaper Eastern Eye's 50 Sexiest Asian Women List, Parulkar ranked 29th in 2014 and ranked 40th in 2015.

== Filmography ==
=== Television ===
Year	Serial	Role	Notes	Ref.
2009	Saat Phere – Saloni Ka Safar	Savri Singh		
2009	Kis Desh Mein Hai Meraa Dil	Rano		
2010–2012	Sapnon Se Bhare Naina	Akruti		
2012	Gumrah	Kanak Dagar	Season 1	
2013–2014	Ek Mutthi Aasmaan	Kalpana "Kalpi" Jadhav Singhania		
2013	Doli Armaano Ki	Herself	Special appearance	
2014–2015	Bharat Ka Veer Putra – Maharana Pratap	Maharani Ajabde Punwar		
2019	Namah	Devi Parvati		
2022; 2023	Maddam Sir	Shivani Pawar		
2025–present	Pyaar Kii Raahein	Priya Rudra Shekhawat		

=== Films ===
Year	Title	Role	Notes	Ref.
2020	Gunjan Saxena: The Kargil Girl	Unknown	Uncredited role	

== Awards and nominations ==
Year	Award	Category	Work	Result	Ref.
2013	Gold Awards	Best Actress in a Lead Role	Ek Mutthi Aasmaan	Nominated	
