= Aashka Goradia =

Indian television actress (born 1985)

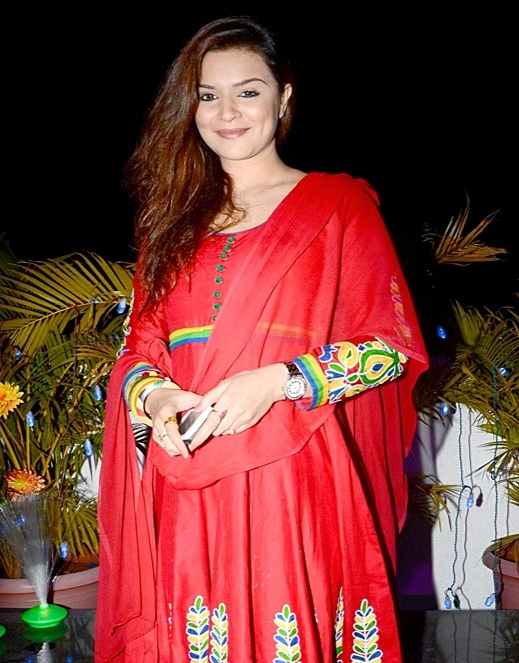
- Goradia in 2012
- Born: November 27, 1985 (age 40); Ahmedabad, Gujarat, India
- Occupations: Actress; entrepreneur
- Years active: 2002–2019
- Known for: Kkusum; Sinndoor Tere Naam Ka; Bigg Boss 6; Bharat Ka Veer Putra – Maharana Pratap; Baal Veer; Naagin 2
- Spouse: Brent Goble (m. 2017)
- Children: 2

Aashka Goradia Goble (born 27 November 1985) is a former Indian actress and entrepreneur who worked in Hindi television. Goradia is known for portraying Kkumud Kapoor Oberoi in Kkusum, Arpita Prasad Raizada in Sinndoor Tere Naam Ka, Dheer Bai Bhatiyani in Bharat Ka Veer Putra – Maharana Pratap, Mahavinashni in Baal Veer and Avantika in Naagin and Naagin 2. She participated in Fear Factor: Khatron Ke Khiladi 4 and Bigg Boss 6, where she was placed at 7th and 8th place respectively. She won the ITA Award for Best Actress in a Negative Role, for her role in Bharat Ka Veer Putra – Maharana Pratap.

== Career ==
Goradia started her career with Sony TV's Achanak 37 Saal Baad in 2002 and comedy sitcom Acting Acting. Soon after, she was signed on for Kkusum on Sony TV in which she played the role of Kumud. She then acted in another serial Akela which also aired on Sony TV. She also did a reality game show Jet Set Go on Star One but was replaced by Shama Sikander. She then played some roles in TV serials like Sinndoor Tere Naam Ka on Zee TV, Mere Apne on 9X and Virrudh on Sony TV. She was also seen as Kalika in Zee TV's Saat Phere, Sony TV's Shubh Vivah and Kalavati Laagi Tujhse Lagan on Colors TV, which were all negative characters.

Goradia has also participated in some reality shows like Kabhi Kabhii Pyaar Kabhi Kabhii Yaar, Mr. & Ms. TV and Khatron Ke Khiladi Season 4. In 2012, she participated as a contestant in the sixth season of Bigg Boss, the Indian version of the original UK show Big Brother entering the Bigg Boss house on 6 October 2012 and getting evicted on 28 December 2012 (on the 83rd day of the show). Slamming reality shows in an interview in 2018, she alleged that the producers had misreprented her as a lesbian on the show.

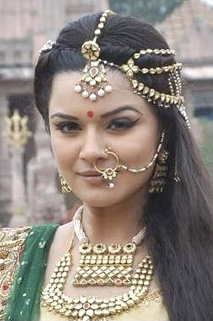
Goradia on the sets of Bharat Ka Veer Putra – Maharana Pratap

From 2013 to 2015, she played the role of Maharani Dheer Bai Bhatiyani in the television series Bharat Ka Veer Putra – Maharana Pratap on Sony TV. In August 2015, she played the evil fairy Mahavinashini on Sab TV's Baal Veer. She was then seen in the supernatural drama Naagin from 2016 to 2017.

In 2017, she participated in the couple dance reality show Nach Baliye Season 8 on StarPlus with fiancé Brent Goble. First eliminated on 14 May, they as a wild card entry only to be eliminated again on 4 June. In 2019, Goradia was seen playing the role of Sapt-roopa on &TV's show Daayan. Her last screen appearance was as a contestant on Kitchen Champion 5.

== Personal life ==
Aashka dated television actor Rohit Bakshi from 2006 to 2015. After her break-up, she started dating Brent Goble, an American businessman. Aashka married Brent on 1 December 2017 in a Christian wedding ceremony, followed with a traditional Hindu ceremony on 3 December 2017. The couple welcomed their first child, a boy, in October 2023. Their second child, also a boy, was born in May 2026.

Trolled for undergoing a lip job in 2018, Aashka responded by opening up about the surgery and claiming that her choice to look better did not make her fake. Earlier the same year, she slammed the reality show Bigg Boss in an interview with actor and talkshow host Rajeev Khandelwal on his show Juzzbaatt for misrepresenting her as a lesbian by using editing tricks.

== Other work ==
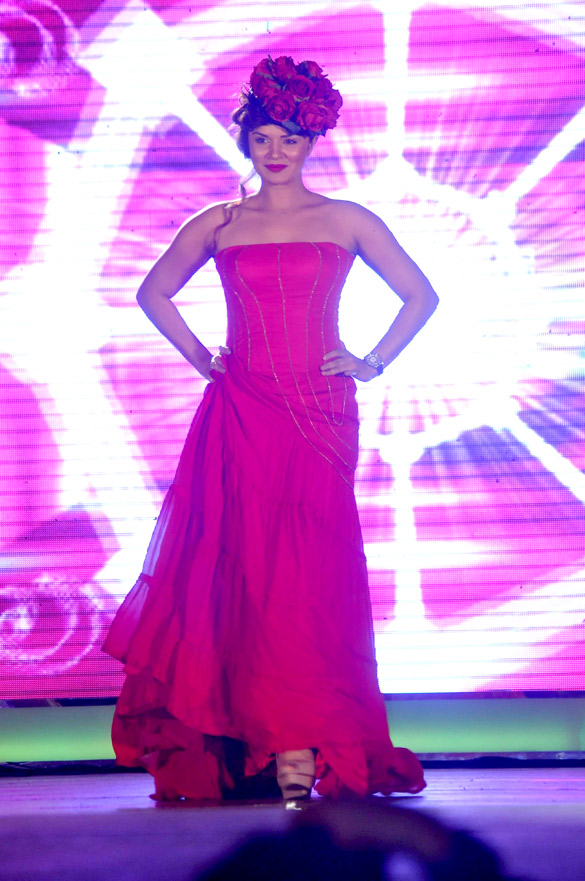
Goradia at a fashion show supporting ‘’Girl Child’’ in 2012

In 2018, Goradia launched her cosmetic brand Renée Cosmetics. She then launched India's first double stitched 3D eyelashes under the brand, named after her mother-in-law. She named the first products after close friends like actresses Juhi Parmar, Mouni Roy and Abigail Jain. She was also invited to be a speaker at a TED Talk later that year. In 2021, Renée Cosmetics was named as one of the power brands at Femina Power Brands 2021. In the same year, it won India's Most Trusted Brand award at CNBC Most Trusted Brands Of India.

== Filmography ==
=== Television ===
Year	Show	Role
2002	Achanak 37 Saal Baad	Komal
2003	Bhabhi	Seema
2003	Tum Bin Jaaoon Kahaan	Annu
2003–2004	Kayaamat	Vishakha
2003–2005	Kkusum	Kkumud Kapoor Oberoi
2004	Kyunki Saas Bhi Kabhi Bahu Thi	Razia Khan
2005	Piya Ka Ghar	Chandni
2006	Akela	Kinnari
2006	Kahiin to Hoga	Gayatri Ahluwalia
2006-2007	Sinndoor Tere Naam Ka	Arpita Prasad Raizada
2006	Jet Set Go	Contestant
2007–2008	Virrudh	Naina Siddharth Chopra
2007	Mere Apne	Sanya Pandey
2008	Saat Phere – Saloni Ka Safar	Advocate Kalika Singh
2008	Kabhi Kabhii Pyaar Kabhi Kabhii Yaar	Contestant
2009	Specials @ 10	Tara
2010–2012	Laagi Tujhse Lagan	Kalavati "Kala" Patil
2010	Mr. & Ms. TV	Contestant
2010	Kaun Banega Crorepati	Herself; Guest appearance
2011	Jhalak Dikhhla Jaa 4	Contestant
2011	Fear Factor: Khatron Ke Khiladi 4	Contestant; 7th place
2012	Shubh Vivah	Sarla Awasthi
2012	Bigg Boss 6	Contestant; 8th place
2013–2015	Bharat Ka Veer Putra – Maharana Pratap	Rani Dheer Bai Bhatiyani
2014	Adaalat	Advocate Meera Thakur
2014	Get Rich With Aashka	Host
2015	Savdhaan India	Asma
2015–2016	Baalveer	Mahavinashini Pari
2016	Naagin	Avantika
2016–2017	Naagin 2	Avantika
2017	Nach Baliye 8	Contestant; 6th place
2019	Daayan	Saptroopa
2019	Kitchen Champion 5	Contestant

== Awards and nominations ==
Year	Award	Category	Work	Result	Ref.
2013	Indian Television Academy Awards	Best Actress in a Negative Role	Bharat Ka Veer Putra – Maharana Pratap	Won	
2014	Indian Television Academy Awards	Best Actress in a Negative Role	Bharat Ka Veer Putra – Maharana Pratap	Nominated	
2014	Indian Telly Awards	Best Actress in a Negative Role	Bharat Ka Veer Putra – Maharana Pratap	Nominated	
