= Reth (TV series) =

- A promotional logo image of "Reth".
- Created by: Shakuntalam Telefilms
- Directed by: Mohinder Pratap Singh, Rajan Shahi, & Shefali Shah
- Starring: see below
- Opening theme: "Reth" by Shreya Ghoshal
- Country of origin: India
- No. of seasons: 1
- No. of episodes: 359

Production
- Producers: Nilima Bajpai & Anirudh Sharma
- Running time: Approx. 22 minutes

Original release
- Network: Zee TV
- Release: 12 July 2004 – 3 February 2006

Reth (International Title: Sands Of Times)was one of the popular Zee TV serial that aired between 12 July 2004 and 3 February 2006, based on the story of a young daughter-in-law Jiya who is in conflict with her new family.

== Plot ==
A rape victim tries to regain her honour after being gang raped. Jiya was a typical middle-class bahu till one event changes everything for her. In order to save her unmarried sister-in-law from rape she throws herself before the rapists. While her marital family appreciates her sacrifice, they do not completely accept her back. She battles the stigma despite being ostracised.

== Cast ==
- Tejal Shah / Deepa Parab as Jiya Shekhar Pandey
- Diwakar Pundir as Kshom
- Ankur Nayyar / Sachin Verma as Shekhar Pandey
- Amrapali Gupta as Aarushi (Aaru) Pandey
- Nupur Alankar as Devyani Samar Pandey
- Kamya Panjabi as Netra Shekhar Pandey
- Kishwer Merchant as Dr. Dakshi
- Kanika Maheshwari as Chhavi
- Anang Desai as Gyan Pandey
- Anita Wahi / Utkarsha Naik as Rukmini Gyan Pandey
- Sai Deodhar as Tanu
- Harsh Vashisht as Manas
- Amardeep Jha as Devyani's mother
- Suhita Thatte as Jiya's mother
- Rajeev Kumar as Samar Pandey
- Shilpa Tulaskar as Kshom and Chhavi's mother
- Rajeev Bharadwaj as Harsh: Aarushi's husband
- Girish Jain as Harsh: Aarushi's boyfriend

== Production ==
The series had a crossover with Astitva... Ek Prem Kahani.
