= Eryck Abecassis =

French composer

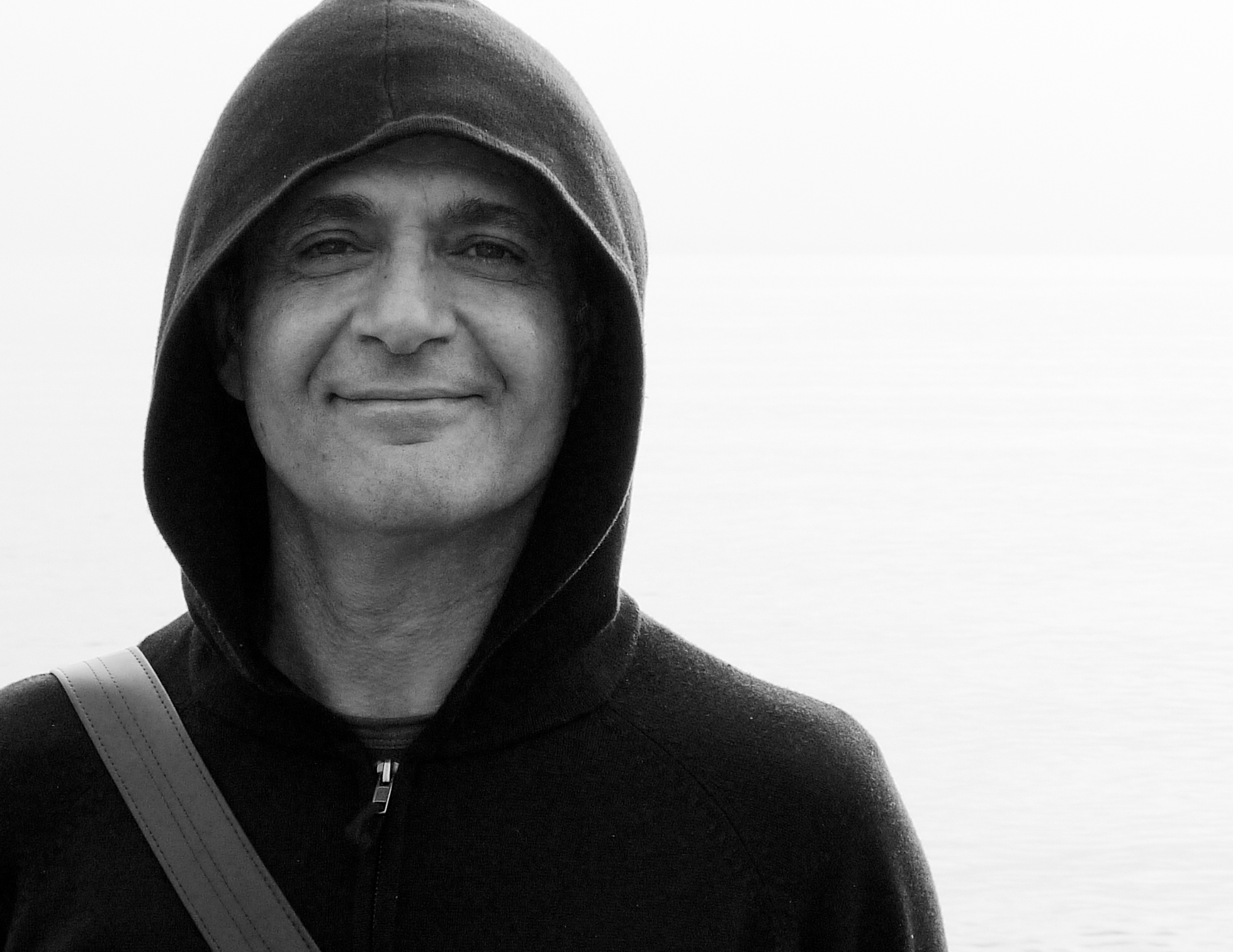
Eryck Abecassis

Eryck Abecassis (born 1956) is a composer, musician and an electric guitar player. He composes and plays a wide range of music including orchestral to chamber music, electronic, theater, street theater, and cinema.

He started doing workshops on instrumental research at the IRCAM (Institute for music/acoustic research and coordination) in Paris (where he also did a computer music course).

He has been commissioned to compose music for Radio-France, Gmem, Ina-Grm, Grame, French government. His music has been played in international music festivals of "Présences", "Les Musiques-Marseille", "Musiques en scène-Lyon","Amplitude Festival Denmark","Computer Art Festival Padova" and some others.

As an electronic musician he travels in many countries including Spain, Brazil, Germany, Austria, England, Sweden, South Korea, and Italy. His style ranges between contemporary and electronic "noise music", with extensive use of the computer.

He has composed scores for film and documentaries, like Hava Aney Dey directed by Partho Sen-Gupta.

== Works ==
=== Stage ===
- Saved (incidental music, play by Edward Bond), 1984
- Les carnets de Junko, 5 comedians, cello, marimba, 1989
- Rois de cœur (dance music, choreography by Dominique Petit), 1991
- Bâtisseurs (incidental music), soprano, tenor, 1992
- récif (street theatre show), 1998;
- Cosmogonia (spectacle), 1998;
- La cage (pocket opera, libretto by Christophe Tarkos), mezzo-soprano, comedian, any 6 players, 1999 (collaboration with Thierry Aué);
- Passages (spectacle), 2002;
- Tempête (street theatre show), 2003;
- Le monde à l'envers (street theatre show), 2005

=== Orchestral ===
- Kammerzirkus, small orchestra (17 players), 1996

=== Electroacoustic ===
- Mondes dérangés, 8-track tape, 2003

=== Multimedia ===
- Poupées-fantômes, piano, percussion, computer, film, 2004
