= Jahazpur =

Jahazpur Yagyapur
- City
- Location in Rajasthan, India Jahazpur (India)
- Coordinates: 25.62°N 75.28°E
- Country: India
- State: Rajasthan
- District: Bhilwara
- Elevation: 334 m (1,096 ft)

Population (2001)
  - Total: 18,816

Languages
  - Official: Hindi, English, Kheradi
- Time zone: UTC+5:30 (IST)

Jahazpur is a historical town and a municipality in Bhilwara district in the Indian state of Rajasthan. It is also the tehsil headquarters of the Jahazpur tehsil. It is known for the Jain temple swastidham, built around the Jahazpur fort.

== History ==
According to a legend, the fort of Jahazpur was originally built by Samprati, grandson of the Mauryan emperor Ashoka, who was a follower of Jainism. This fort once guarded the Hadoti Bundi and Mewar terrain like a Giridwar (mountain pass). In the fourteenth century, Rana Kumbha rebuilt the fort of Jahazpur.

Jahazpur has historically been inhabited by the Meena tribe. Members of the Motish and Pratihar (or Padihar) clans ruled the area as part of the matsya janapada and later under the Maurya Empire.

Jahazpur State was taken in 1572 by Jagmal Singh, when he was denied the kingship of Mewar. He went into Mughal service, and Emperor Akbar gifted him Jahazpur Jagir, he used Rao as his title; Jahazpur State existed until 1758, when the Maratha forces invaded the Jahazpur fort, forcing the rulers to shift to Anjar.

The Meena population participated in protests against British rule in 1855 and 1857. In 1809, Meena chieftains attacked Maratha positions, leading to the withdrawal of Mahadji Scindia from the region. In 1867, the Mewar state granted the parganas of Jahazpur, Hindoli, Deoli, and Gormagarh to Meena chieftains. These chieftains maintained administrative control over the Kherad region, with Gormagarh serving as the capital.

The ruins of several ancient Jain temples have been found at Jahazpur.

== Geography ==
Jahazpur is a town in Rajasthan located at 25.62°N 75.28°E near Bundi and Shahpura, towns of Bhilwara, and Deoli, a town in Tonk district. It has an average elevation of 334 m (1,096 ft). The area has rich mineral resources.

== Demographics ==
As of 2001 India census, Jahazpur had a population of 18,816. Males constitute 51% of the population while the females constitute another 49%. Jahazpur has an average literacy rate of 59%, lower than the national average of 59.5%: male literacy is 72%, and female literacy is 45%. 16% of the population is under 6 years of age.

== Elected Representatives ==
Jahazpur is one of the 200 Vidhan Sabha (legislative) constituencies in Rajasthan. Gopichand Meena serves as the Member of Legislative Assembly (MLA) representing Jahazpur in the Rajasthan Legislative Assembly.

== Temples ==
=== Shri 1008 Munisuvratnath Jain Mandir ===
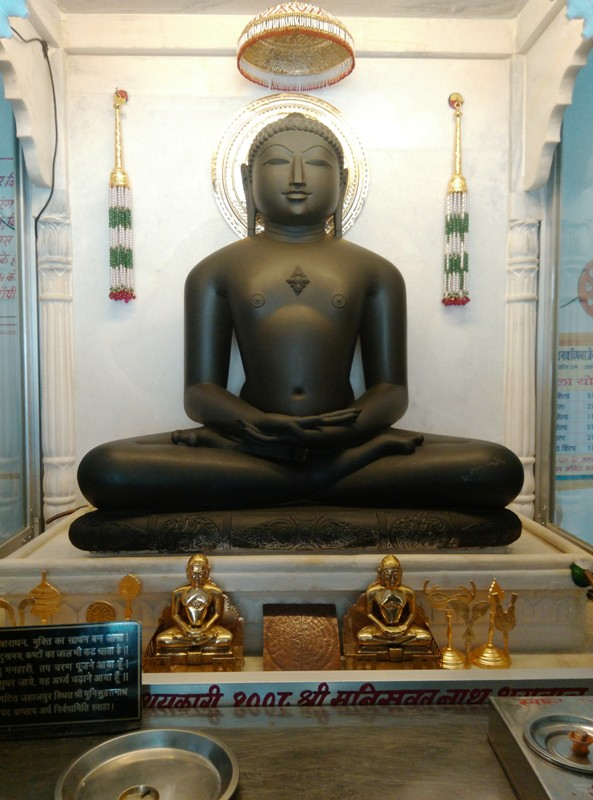
Statue of Tirthankara Munisuvratnath

Jahazpur, along with Hasteda, is known for its ancient idols of Munisuwartnath. The temples at Jahazpur and Hasteda is dedicated to Munisuvrata, the 20th tirthankara of Jainism. The Moolnayak idol at the newly built Jahaj (ship) shaped temple at Jahazpur is a black idol of Munisuvrata Swami. This temple has been constructed with the inspiration of Shri 105 Swasti Bhushan Mataji. The idol is considered miraculous by Jains.

The statue of Munisuvrat Nath was unearthed from the ground during the construction of a house in Jahazpur in 2013.

=== Shri 1008 Bhooteshwar Mahadev ===
There is a historical temple of Hindu god Shiva in the village of Luhari-Kalan and is famous among the locals.

=== Chavandiya mata ===
The temple is dedicated to Chavandiya Mataji and is located near Jahazpur.

== Raos of Jahazpur ==
- Rao Jagmal Singh (1572 – 1583) - (b. 1545 - d. 1583)
- Rao Vijay Singh (1583 – 1620) - (b. 1568 - d. 1620)
- Rao Prithviraj Singh (1620 – 1628) - (b. 1590 - d. 1628)
- Rao Gajraj Singh (1628 – 1660) - (b. 1615 - d. 1660)
- Rao Maandev (1660 – 1678) - (b. 1638 - d. 1678)
- Rao Surajdev (1678 – 1734) - (b. 1664 - d. 1734)
- Rao Shaktidev (1734 – 1738) - (b. 1688 - d. 1738)
- Rao Hamirji (1738 – 1758) - (b. 1708 - d. 1788)

Meena Chiefs after Maratha Invasion

- Rao Peetha Meena (around 1867)
