= Jagmal Singh =

Ruler of Jahazpur and Sirohi
- Reign: c. 1572-1583 (Jahazpur), 1581-1583 (Sirohi)(as co-ruler)
- Born: 22 May 1554; Kingdom of Mewar
- Died: 17 October 1583 (aged 29); Mughal Empire
- Spouse: Daughter of Maharao Man Singh II of Sirohi
- Issue: Thakur Vijai Singh
- Father: Udai Singh II
- Mother: Rani Dheer Bai Bhattiyani

Jagmal Singh was a sixteenth-century Indian prince and court figure. He was the son of Maharana Udai Singh II and Rani Dheerbai Bhatiyani.

== Biography ==
After the death of Udai Singh II his favorite wife, Dheerbai Bhatiyani, wanted Jagmal to succeed Maharana Udai Singh after his death even though he was not the eldest son. On his deathbed, Udai Singh II named Jagmal Singh as the next Maharana. Jagmal was to be crowned as Maharana of Udaipur in 1572; however, the nobles of the court instead crowned Maharana Pratap.

Jagmal left Mewar and went into the service of the Mughal Subedar in Ajmer, who gave him shelter. Later he met Akbar and was given the jagir of Jahazpur as a gift. Sometime before 1581, he married the daughter of Maharao Man Singh II of Sirohi and became the co-ruler of half of Sirohi in 1581. His brother-in-law and ruler of Sirohi Rao Surtan became his enemy after this. He was killed by Rao Hammirji of Chandana on 17 October 1583 at the Battle of Dattani.
