= Faisal Khan (dancer) =

Indian dancer and actor (born 1999)

- Born: 30 January 1999 (age 27); Mumbai, Maharashtra, India
- Occupations: Dancer; actor
- Years active: 2012–present
- Known for: Jhalak Dikhhla Jaa 8 Bharat Ka Veer Putra - Maharana Pratap

Faisal Khan (born 30 January 1999) is an Indian dancer and actor. He is the winner of reality shows including Jhalak Dikhhla Jaa 8, Dance India Dance Li'l Masters 2, Dance Ke Superkids and DID Dance Ka Tashan.

== Personal life ==
Khan was born in 1999 and brought up in Mumbai, Maharashtra, India. His father was an auto rickshaw driver. Khan completed his tenth class studies at Meera Academy school in Ghatkopar, Mumbai. He learnt freestyle dance by dance teacher Shrikanth Ahire.

== Career ==
=== Dancing ===
Khan began his career at the age of 15 as a dancer, he gave an audition in the second kids special season of Zee TV'S dance reality series Dance India Dance, where he was selected and came out as the winner with ₹10 lakh (US$10,000) prize money, and won a Favorite Shisya award at Zee Rishtey Awards. The show was judged by Geeta Kapoor, Marzi Pestonji, Terence Lewis. The series aired from April 2012 to August 2012.

After winning the series, he participated in another season of Dance India Dance title, Dance Ke Superkids. he was team-up with Raghav Juyal, Kruti Mahesh and Prince Gupta in the "Yahoo" team, which he won. The series was aired in September 2012 on Zee television.

=== Acting ===
Khan made his acting debut with Sony Entertainment Television's historical drama series Bharat Ka Veer Putra – Maharana Pratap, where he played the younger version of the protagonist Maharana Pratap. His performance in this series, he received critical praise, and won two Best Child Actor – Male awards at Indian Television Academy Awards and Indian Telly Awards, and received several nominations.

In August 2014, Khan gave a special dance performance in the eighth season of Sony TV's game show Kaun Banega Crorepati, he performed there dressed up as Maharana Pratap on grand premiere. In the same month, Khan appeared as a guest dance performer in the seventh season of Colors TV's celebrity dance reality series Jhalak Dikhhla Jaa, where he joined the contestant Mouni Roy and choreographer partner Punit Pathak, in special "Teen Ka Tadka" episode. Later in November 2014, Khan acted in Sony TV's crime thriller series C.I.D.. He portrayed an episodic role as the character of a dancer Faizal Khan, who is the prime suspect of a murder. In April 2015, Khan played the pivotal role in Sony Entertainment Television's courtroom drama series Bhanwar – Kalyug Ki Hairatangez Kahaniyaa. In June 2015, Khan gave a special dance performance on the finale episode of Colors TV's talent-based reality show India's Got Talent, he performed with the contestants X1X and Beat Breakers.

In August 2015, Khan participated in the eighth season of Colors TV's celebrity dance reality show Jhalak Dikhhla Jaa. He won and emerged as the youngest winner of the series, and received ₹30 lakh (US$31,000) prize money and a Mahendra SUV car, the show was judged by Shahid Kapoor, Malaika Arora Khan, Lauren Gottlieb and Ganesh Hegde. The series ran from July to October 2015. In January 2016, he participated in Fear Factor: Khatron Ke Khiladi 7. He teamed up with his choreographer Raghav Juyal and the host of DID Little Masters Jay Bhanushali. He got eliminated in February 2016.

In May 2019, he was cast to portray elder version of Chandragupta Maurya in Chandragupta Maurya replacing Kartikey Malviya whi portrayed younger version of the same.

Khan made his film debut with Marathi film Prem Kahani, he portrayed the role of a Rajasthani boy Baiju.

In 2022, he is portraying Lord Garuda in Sony SAB's Dharm Yoddha Garud.

== Filmography ==
=== Television ===
Year	Title	Role	Notes	Ref.
2012	Dance India Dance Li'l Masters 2	Contestant	Winner	
2012	Dance Ke Superkids	Contestant	Winner	
2013	India's Best Dramebaaz	Himself	Guest	
2013–2014	Bharat Ka Veer Putra – Maharana Pratap	Maharana Pratap		
2013	DID Dance Ka Tashan	Contestant	Winner	
2014	Kaun Banega Crorepati 8	Himself	Guest	
2014	Jhalak Dikhhla Jaa 7	Himself	Guest	
2014	C.I.D	Faisal		
2015	Jhalak Dikhhla Jaa 8	Contestant	Winner	
2016	Fear Factor: Khatron Ke Khiladi 7	Contestant	13th place	
2016	Tuyul & Mba Yul Reborn	Himself	Guest	
2016	Jhalak Dikhhla Jaa 9	Himself	Guest	
2017	Dance Champions	Contestant	5th place	
2018	Kundali Bhagya	Himself	Episode 308	
2019	Chandragupta Maurya	Chandragupta Maurya		
2019	Nach Baliye 9	Contestant	11th place	
2022	Dharm Yoddha Garud	Garud Dev		
2024	Wagle Ki Duniya - Nayi Peedhi Naye Kissey	Abhay Bansal		

=== Films ===
Year	Title	Role	Language
2016	Prem Kahani	Baijoo	Marathi

=== Web series ===
Year	Title	Role	Notes
2019	Modi: Journey of a Common Man	Young Modi	

=== Music videos ===
Year	Title	Singer(s)	Ref.
2020	Tere Bina	Amit Mishra	
2021	Saat Samundar	Niyati Handa	
2021	Deva Deva	Swarit Kelkar, Nikhil Palkar, Heli Majmudar	
2021	Naraaj	Laksh	
2023	Haan Magar	Naveen Arora	

== Awards and nominations ==
Year	Award	Category	Role	Work	Result
2013	Indian Television Academy Awards	GR8! Face of the Year – Male	Maharana Pratap Singh	Bharat Ka Veer Putra – Maharana Pratap	Nominated
2014	Gold Awards	Best Lead Actor (Male)	Maharana Pratap Singh	Bharat Ka Veer Putra – Maharana Pratap	Nominated
2014	Indian Telly Awards	Best Child Artiste (Male)	Maharana Pratap Singh	Bharat Ka Veer Putra – Maharana Pratap	Won
2014	Indian Television Academy Awards	Best Child Actor	Maharana Pratap Singh	Bharat Ka Veer Putra – Maharana Pratap	Won
2022	Indian Television Academy Awards	Popular Actor - Drama	Garud Dev	Dharm Yoddha Garud	Nominated

Awards and achievements
Preceded by Jitumoni Kalita (Season 1)	DID Li'l Masters; 2012 (Season 2)	Succeeded by Teriya Magar (Season 3)

Awards and achievements
Preceded by Ashish Sharma (Season 7)	Jhalak Dikhhla Jaa - Dancing with the Stars; 2016 (Season 8)	Succeeded by Teriya Magar (Season 9)
