= Teriya Magar =

Nepalese dancer

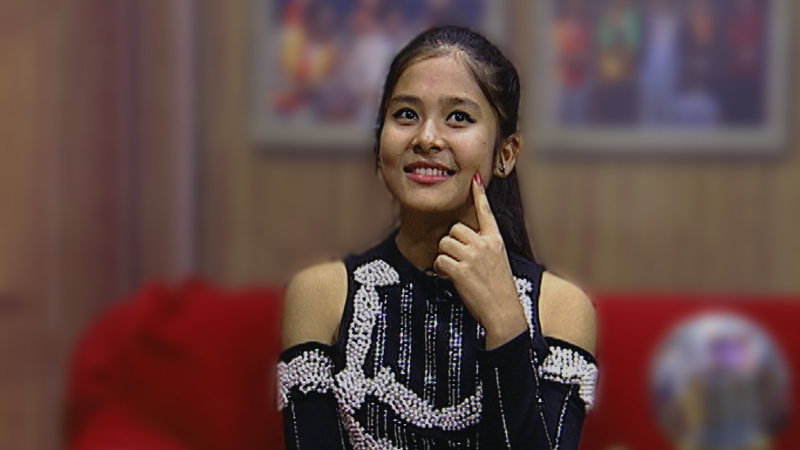
- Born: Butwal, Nepal
- Occupation: Dancer/Student
- Years active: 2014–present
- Known for: Winning DID-Li'l Master Season 3, Jhalak Dikhhla Jaa (Season 9)
- Height: 5 ft 2 in (157 cm)
- Parent(s): Anita Phounja Magar; Bijay Phounja Magar

Teriya Phounja Magar is a Nepalese dancer based in Mumbai, India. She came into the public spotlight during her performances on the dance competition television series Dance India Dance Li'l Masters which she won on 21 June 2014. She is also the winner of Colors TV dance reality show Jhalak Dikhhla Jaa (season 9) which she won on 21 January 2017. Teriya is the second daughter born to her parents, and attended St. Lawrence High School in Vashi, Navi Mumbai, India.

On 29 June 2014, Teriya was honored with the title "Lumbini Peace Ambassador" by the Kapilvastu Day Campaign. The award was presented by the Deputy Prime Minister and Minister for Local Development, Prakash Man Singh.

== Career ==
She has been passionate about dance since childhood, regularly participating in various dance competitions. She began learning dance in Butwal at the age of 7. Teriya primarily performs in freestyle and Bollywood dance forms. In addition to that, she is known for her versatility and has won several other dance competitions in Nepal.

=== Dance India Dance Li'l Masters ===
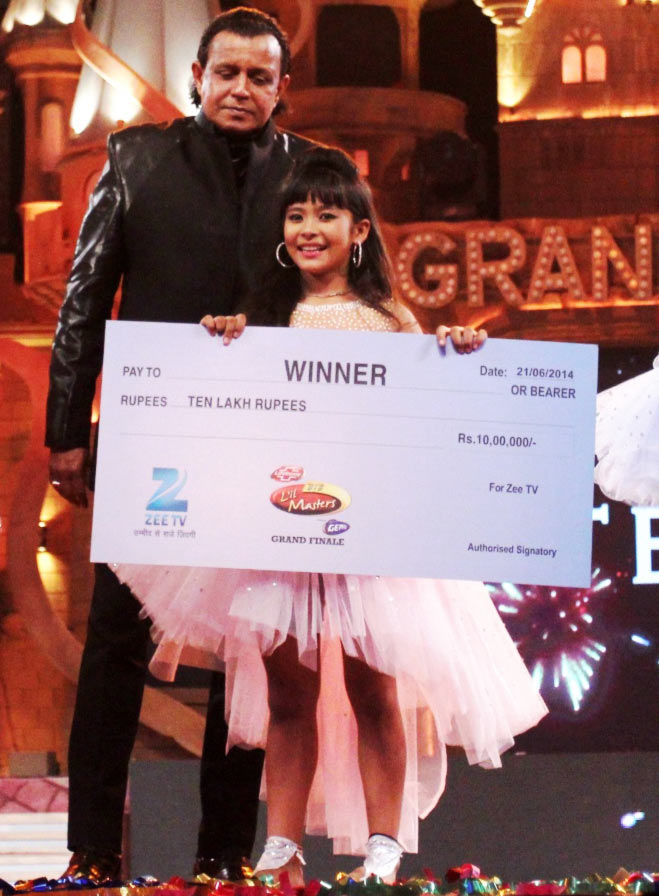
DID Li'l Masters 3 winning moment

She began her career at the age of 11 as a dancer, auditioning for the third season of Zee TV's dance reality series Dance India Dance Li'l Masters, where she was selected and emerged as the winner with a prize of ₹10 lakh (US$14,000). The show was judged by Geeta Kapoor, Ahmed Khan, and Mudassar Khan, while Mithun Chakraborty served as the Grand Master of the show. This platform brought her significant fame among the people in both India and Nepal.

=== Jhalak Dikhhla Ja (season 9) ===
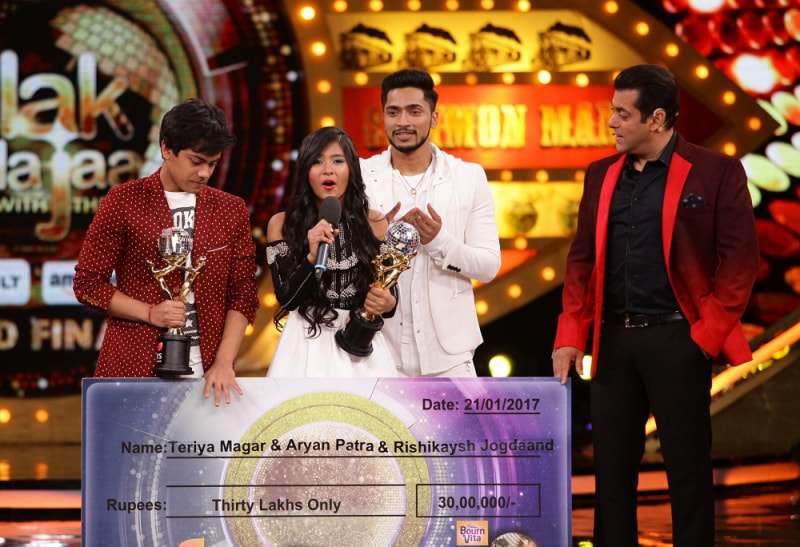
Teriya's winning moment of Jhalak

After winning DID Li'l Masters season 3, she participated in the ninth season of Colors TV's celebrity dance reality show Jhalak Dikhhla Jaa. In the October 8 episode, five wildcard entries were introduced by Farah Khan (who also joined the show as a judge). Teriya received a wildcard entry as a young celebrity challenger, along with Siddharth Nigam, Spandan Chaturvedi, Gracy Goswami, and Swasti Nitya. Although she was eliminated, she re-entered as a wildcard on November 26, 2017. After returning to the show, she impressed in every episode and became the first contestant to enter the finals.

The grand finale featured remarkable performances and perfect scores. Teriya and her partner Aryan achieved perfect scores and received the maximum audience votes, emerging as the winners of the celebrity dance reality show. The show was judged by Karan Johar, Farah Khan, Jacqueline Fernandez, and Ganesh Hegde. The finale also featured actor Hrithik Roshan, who came to promote his film Kaabil and encouraged the finalists. Teriya took home the winning trophy and a cash prize of ₹30 lakhs.

== Filmography ==
=== Television ===
Year	Title	Role	Notes
2014	Dance India Dance Li'l Masters 3	Contestant	Winner
2015	India's Best Dramebaaz – season 2	Herself	Special Appearance
2016	Comedy Nights Bachao	Guest Appearance	Children's Special
2016	Bigg Boss (Hindi season 10)	Herself along with other contestants of Jhalak Dikhhla Jaa 9	To celebrate New Year as the contestants from Jhalak Dikhhla Jaa 9
2016	Jhalak Dikhhla Jaa – season 9	Contestant	Winner with Aryan Patra
2017	Dance Champions	Herself	Contestant: Champions Team
2018	Dance India Dance Li'l Masters 4	Herself	Special Appearance
2018	Kundali Bhagya - Episode Event	Guest Performer	Ganesh Chaturthi Special
2023	Swaraj	Young Rani Gaidinliu	Episode 44

=== Web series ===
Campus beats on Amazon MX Player

=== Cover Songs ===
Year	Song	Notes
2019	Timro Mayale Badhera Rakha	

== Awards ==
Year	Award	Presenter	Ref
2014	Lumbini Peace Ambassador	Prakash Man Singh	

== See also ==
- Nepalese female dancers
- List of Nepalese people
- Non Resident Nepali

Awards and achievements
Preceded by Faisal Khan (Season 2)	DID Li'l Masters; 2014 (Season 3)	Succeeded by Jiya Thakur (Season 4)
Preceded by Faisal Khan	Jhalak Dikhhla Jaa - Dancing with the Stars; 2016 (Season 9)	Succeeded by Gunjan Sinha
