= List of accolades received by Koi... Mil Gaya =

Koi... Mil Gaya awards and nominations
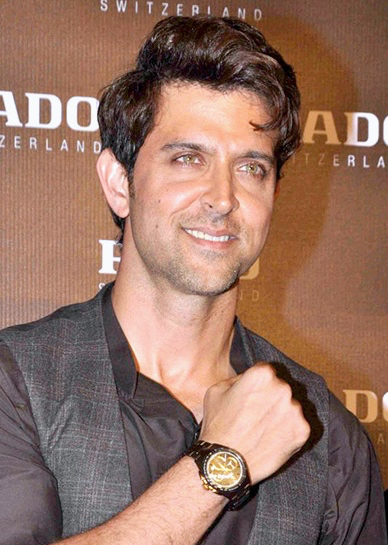
- Hrithik Roshan garnered several awards and nominations for his performance in Koi... Mil Gaya.
Awards and nominations
Award	Wins	Nominations
Bollywood Movie Awards	6	6
Filmfare Awards	5	11
International Indian Film Academy Awards	5	11
National Film Awards	3	3
Producers Guild Film Awards	4	13
Screen Awards	5	12
Stardust Awards	2	3
Zee Cine Awards	5	12

Totals (Note: Certain award groups do not simply award one winner. They acknowledge several different recipients, have runners-up, and have third place. Since this is a specific recognition and is different from losing an award, runner-up mentions are considered wins in this award tally. For simplification and to avoid errors, each award in this list has been presumed to have had a prior nomination.)
- Wins: 35
- Nominations: 71

Koi... Mil Gaya (transl. I Have Found Someone...) is a 2003 Indian Hindi-language science fiction film directed and produced by Rakesh Roshan. Starring Hrithik Roshan and Preity Zinta, the film focuses on Rohit (Hrithik Roshan), a developmentally disabled man who comes into contact with an extraterrestrial being while using the computer of his late father Sanjay (Rakesh Roshan). In addition to writing the film's story, Rakesh Roshan also created its screenplay along with Sachin Bhowmick, Honey Irani, and Robin Bhatt. The cinematography was handled by Ravi K. Chandran and Sameer Arya, and the production designer was Sharmishta Roy. Farah Khan, Raju Khan, and Ganesh Hegde served as the choreographers, while Allan Amin and Tinu Verma completed the action direction. Rajesh Roshan and Sanjay Verma were the music director and editor, respectively.

Produced on a budget of between ₹250 million (US$2.6 million) and ₹350 million (US$3.6 million), Koi... Mil Gaya was released on 8 August 2003 and received positive reviews from critics. A commercial success, the film emerged as the second-highest-grossing Indian film of the year, earning ₹823.3 million (US$8.5 million) in India and abroad. The film won 35 awards out of 71 nominations; the direction, performances of the cast, choreography, and special effects garnered the most attention from various award groups.

Koi... Mil Gaya received three trophies at the 51st National Film Awards, including Best Film on Other Social Issues. At the 49th Filmfare Awards, the film was nominated in eleven categories, including Best Actress (Zinta), Best Supporting Actress (Rekha), and Best Performance in a Comic Role (Johnny Lever), and went on to win five of them including Best Film, Best Director for Rakesh Roshan, and Best Actor and Best Actor (Critics) for Hrithik Roshan. Among other wins, it also received six Bollywood Movie Awards, five International Indian Film Academy Awards, five Screen Awards, five Zee Cine Awards, and four Producers Guild Film Awards.

== Awards and nominations ==
List of accolades received by Koi... Mil Gaya
Award	Date of ceremony (Note: Date is linked to the article about the awards held that year, wherever possible.)	Category	Recipient(s) and nominee(s)	Result	Ref(s)
Bollywood Movie Awards	1 May 2004	Best Actor	Hrithik Roshan	Won	
Bollywood Movie Awards	1 May 2004	Best Actor (Critics)	Hrithik Roshan	Won	
Bollywood Movie Awards	1 May 2004	Best Supporting Actress	Rekha	Won	
Bollywood Movie Awards	1 May 2004	Best Choreography	Farah Khan	Won	
Bollywood Movie Awards	1 May 2004	Best Playback Singer – Female	K. S. Chithra	Won	
Bollywood Movie Awards	1 May 2004	Best Editing	Sanjay Verma	Won	
Filmfare Awards	21 February 2004	Best Film	Rakesh Roshan	Won	
Filmfare Awards	21 February 2004	Best Director	Rakesh Roshan	Won	
Filmfare Awards	21 February 2004	Best Actor	Hrithik Roshan	Won	
Filmfare Awards	21 February 2004	Best Actor (Critics)	Hrithik Roshan	Won	
Filmfare Awards	21 February 2004	Best Actress	Preity Zinta	Nominated	
Filmfare Awards	21 February 2004	Best Supporting Actress	Rekha	Nominated	
Filmfare Awards	21 February 2004	Best Performance in a Comic Role	Johnny Lever	Nominated	
Filmfare Awards	21 February 2004	Best Music Director	Rajesh Roshan	Nominated	
Filmfare Awards	21 February 2004	Best Male Playback Singer	Udit Narayan (for "Idhar Chala Mein")	Nominated	
Filmfare Awards	21 February 2004	Best Female Playback Singer	K. S. Chithra (for "Koi Mil Gaya")	Nominated	
Filmfare Awards	21 February 2004	Best Choreography	Farah Khan (for "Idhar Chala Mein")	Won	
International Indian Film Academy Awards	20 May 2004	Best Film	Rakesh Roshan	Nominated	
International Indian Film Academy Awards	20 May 2004	Best Director	Rakesh Roshan	Won	
International Indian Film Academy Awards	20 May 2004	Best Actor	Hrithik Roshan	Won	
International Indian Film Academy Awards	20 May 2004	Best Actress	Preity Zinta	Nominated	
International Indian Film Academy Awards	20 May 2004	Best Supporting Actress	Rekha	Nominated	
International Indian Film Academy Awards	20 May 2004	Best Music Director	Rajesh Roshan	Nominated	
International Indian Film Academy Awards	20 May 2004	Best Male Playback Singer	Udit Narayan (for "Koi Mil Gaya")	Nominated	
International Indian Film Academy Awards	20 May 2004	Best Song Recording	Satish Gupta	Won	
International Indian Film Academy Awards	20 May 2004	Best Story	Rakesh Roshan	Nominated	
International Indian Film Academy Awards	20 May 2004	Best Sound Recording	Jeetendra Chaudhary	Won	
International Indian Film Academy Awards	20 May 2004	Best Special Effects	Bimmini Special Effects Studio, Digital Art Media	Won	
National Film Awards	3 February 2005	Best Film on Other Social Issues	Rakesh Roshan	Won	
National Film Awards	3 February 2005	Best Special Effects	Bimmini Special Effects Studio, Digital Art Media	Won	
National Film Awards	3 February 2005	Best Choreography	Farah Khan (for "Idhar Chala Mein")	Won	
Producers Guild Film Awards	29 May 2004	Best Film	Rakesh Roshan	Won	
Producers Guild Film Awards	29 May 2004	Best Director	Rakesh Roshan	Won	
Producers Guild Film Awards	29 May 2004	Best Actor in a Leading Role	Hrithik Roshan	Won	
Producers Guild Film Awards	29 May 2004	Best Special Effects	Bimmini Special Effects Studio, Digital Art Media	Won	
Producers Guild Film Awards	29 May 2004	Best Sound Recording	Jeetendra Chaudhary	Nominated	
Producers Guild Film Awards	29 May 2004	Best Male Playback Singer	Udit Narayan (for "Idhar Chala Mein")	Nominated	
Producers Guild Film Awards	29 May 2004	Best Female Playback Singer	K. S. Chithra (for "Koi Mil Gaya")	Nominated	
Producers Guild Film Awards	29 May 2004	Best Music Director	Rajesh Roshan	Nominated	
Producers Guild Film Awards	29 May 2004	Best Art Direction	Sharmista Roy	Nominated	
Producers Guild Film Awards	29 May 2004	Best Lyricist	Ibrahim Ashk (for "Koi Mil Gaya")	Nominated	
Producers Guild Film Awards	29 May 2004	Best Costume Design	Lakshman Mishra	Nominated	
Producers Guild Film Awards	29 May 2004	Best Cinematographer	Sameer Arya, Ravi K. Chandran	Nominated	
Producers Guild Film Awards	29 May 2004	Best Screenplay	Sachin Bhowmick, Honey Irani, Robin Bhatt, Rakesh Roshan	Nominated	
Screen Awards	17 January 2004	Best Film	Rakesh Roshan	Won	
Screen Awards	17 January 2004	Best Director	Rakesh Roshan	Won	
Screen Awards	17 January 2004	Best Actor	Hrithik Roshan	Won	
Screen Awards	17 January 2004	Best Comedian	Johnny Lever	Nominated	
Screen Awards	17 January 2004	Best Background Music	Rajesh Roshan	Nominated	
Screen Awards	17 January 2004	Best Music Director	Rajesh Roshan	Nominated	
Screen Awards	17 January 2004	Best Story	Rakesh Roshan	Nominated	
Screen Awards	17 January 2004	Best Screenplay	Sachin Bhowmick, Honey Irani, Robin Bhatt, Rakesh Roshan	Nominated	
Screen Awards	17 January 2004	Best Cinematography	Ravi K. Chandran	Nominated	
Screen Awards	17 January 2004	Best Special Effects	Bimmini Special Effects Studio, Digital Art Media	Won	
Screen Awards	17 January 2004	Best Choreography	Farah Khan (for "Idhar Chala Mein")	Won	
Screen Awards	17 January 2004	Best Choreography	Ganesh Hegde	Nominated	
Stardust Awards	4 February 2004	Best Director	Rakesh Roshan	Won	
Stardust Awards	4 February 2004	Actor of the Year – Male	Hrithik Roshan	Nominated	
Stardust Awards	4 February 2004	Best New Lyricist	Ibrahim Ashk (for "Koi Mil Gaya")	Won	
Zee Cine Awards	26 February 2004	Best Film	Rakesh Roshan	Won	
Zee Cine Awards	26 February 2004	Best Director	Rakesh Roshan	Won	
Zee Cine Awards	26 February 2004	Best Actor – Male	Hrithik Roshan	Won	
Zee Cine Awards	26 February 2004	Best Actor in a Supporting Role – Female	Rekha	Nominated	
Zee Cine Awards	26 February 2004	Best Actor in a Comic Role	Johnny Lever	Nominated	
Zee Cine Awards	26 February 2004	Best Music Director	Rajesh Roshan	Nominated	
Zee Cine Awards	26 February 2004	Best Track of the Year	"Idhar Chala Mein"	Nominated	
Zee Cine Awards	26 February 2004	Best Choreography	Ganesh Hegde (for "It's Magic")	Won	
Zee Cine Awards	26 February 2004	Best Screenplay	Sachin Bhowmick, Honey Irani, Robin Bhatt, Rakesh Roshan	Nominated	
Zee Cine Awards	26 February 2004	Best Costume Design	Rocky Star	Nominated	
Zee Cine Awards	26 February 2004	Best Sound Re-recording	Alok De	Nominated	
Zee Cine Awards	26 February 2004	Best Visual Effects	Bimmini Special Effects Studio, Digital Art Media	Won	
