= List of accolades received by Fiza =

Fiza awards and nominations
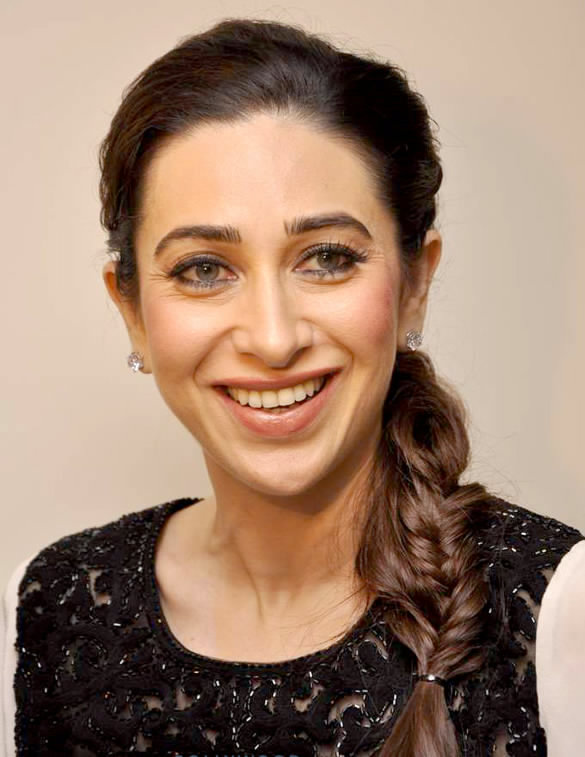
- Karisma Kapoor garnered several accolades for her performance in Fiza.
Awards and nominations
Award	Wins	Nominations
Bengal Film Journalists' Association Award	4	4
Bollywood Movie Awards	2	8
Filmfare Awards	2	8
International Indian Film Academy Awards	2	7
People's Choice Awards India	2	4
Sansui Viewers' Choice Movie Awards	1	3
Zee Cine Awards	2	5

Totals (Note: Certain award groups do not simply award one winner. They acknowledge several different recipients, have runners-up, and have third place. Since this is a specific recognition and is different from losing an award, runner-up mentions are considered wins in this award tally. For simplification and to avoid errors, each award in this list has been presumed to have had a prior nomination.)
- Wins: 15
- Nominations: 46

Fiza, also known as Fiza: In Search Of Her Brother, is a 2000 Indian Hindi-language crime thriller film written and directed by Khalid Mohammed. The film was produced by Pradeep Guha under The Culture Company. It stars Karisma Kapoor as the eponymous lead, along with Hrithik Roshan as her terrorist brother and Jaya Bachchan as their mother.

Upon release, Fiza received positive reviews, with its storyline and soundtrack, as well as cast performances earning praise. A box office hit, the film earned ₹322 million (US$7.17 million) worldwide, thus being the eighth highest-grossing film of the year..

The film received several accolades. At the 46th Filmfare Awards, Fiza received 8 nominations and won 2 awards including Best Actress for Kapoor and Best Supporting Actress for Bachchan. At the 2nd IIFA Awards, it received 7 nominations and won 2 awards including Best Actress for Kapoor and Best Supporting Actress for Bachchan.

== Awards and nominations ==
List of accolades received by Mohabbatein
Award	Date of ceremony (Note: The date is linked to the article about the awards held that year, wherever possible.)	Category	Recipient(s)	Result	Ref.
Bengal Film Journalists' Association Awards	3 June 2001	Best Director (Hindi)	Khalid Mohamed	Won	
Bengal Film Journalists' Association Awards	3 June 2001	Best Actor (Hindi)	Hrithik Roshan	Won	
Bengal Film Journalists' Association Awards	3 June 2001	Best Actress (Hindi)	Karisma Kapoor	Won	
Bengal Film Journalists' Association Awards	3 June 2001	Best Supporting Actress (Hindi)	Jaya Bachchan	Won	
Bollywood Movie Awards	28 April 2001	Best Actress	Karisma Kapoor	Won	
Bollywood Movie Awards	28 April 2001	Best Actress – Critics	Karisma Kapoor	Nominated	
Bollywood Movie Awards	28 April 2001	Best Actress – Critics	Jaya Bachchan	Nominated	
Bollywood Movie Awards	28 April 2001	Best Supporting Actress	Jaya Bachchan	Nominated	
Bollywood Movie Awards	28 April 2001	Best Music Director	Anu Malik	Nominated	
Bollywood Movie Awards	28 April 2001	Best Lyricist	Gulzar for "Aaja Mahiya"	Nominated	
Bollywood Movie Awards	28 April 2001	Best Playback Singer Female	Sunidhi Chauhan for "Mehboob Mere"	Nominated	
Bollywood Movie Awards	28 April 2001	Best Choreography	Ganesh Hegde	Won	
Filmfare Awards	17 February 2001	Best Actor	Hrithik Roshan	Nominated	
Filmfare Awards	17 February 2001	Best Actress	Karisma Kapoor	Won	
Filmfare Awards	17 February 2001	Best Supporting Actress	Jaya Bachchan	Won	
Filmfare Awards	17 February 2001	Best Music Director	Anu Malik	Nominated	
Filmfare Awards	17 February 2001	Best Lyricist	Gulzar for "Aaja Mahiya"	Nominated	
Filmfare Awards	17 February 2001	Best Male Playback Singer	Sonu Nigam for "Tu Hawa Hai"	Nominated	
Filmfare Awards	17 February 2001	Best Female Playback Singer	Sunidhi Chauhan for "Mehboob Mere"	Nominated	
Filmfare Awards	17 February 2001	Best Cinematography	Santosh Sivan	Nominated	
International Indian Film Academy Awards	16 June 2001	Best Actress	Karisma Kapoor	Won	
International Indian Film Academy Awards	16 June 2001	Best Supporting Actress	Jaya Bachchan	Won	
International Indian Film Academy Awards	16 June 2001	Best Performance in a Negative Role	Manoj Bajpayee	Nominated	
International Indian Film Academy Awards	16 June 2001	Best Music Director	A. R. Rahman, Anu Malik, Ranjit Barot	Nominated	
International Indian Film Academy Awards	16 June 2001	Best Lyricist	Gulzar for "Tu Fiza Hai"	Nominated	
International Indian Film Academy Awards	16 June 2001	Best Male Playback Singer	Udit Narayan for "Aaja Mahiya"	Nominated	
International Indian Film Academy Awards	16 June 2001	Best Female Playback Singer	Sunidhi Chauhan for "Mehboob Mere"	Nominated	
People's Choice Awards India	2004	Best Actor	Hrithik Roshan	Nominated	
People's Choice Awards India	2004	Best Actress	Karisma Kapoor	Won	
People's Choice Awards India	2004	Best Supporting Actress	Jaya Bachchan	Won	
People's Choice Awards India	2004	Best Comic Performance	Asha Sachdev	Nominated	
Sansui Viewers' Choice Movie Awards	3 June 2001	Best Actress	Karisma Kapoor	Nominated	
Sansui Viewers' Choice Movie Awards	3 June 2001	Best Actress – Critics	Karisma Kapoor	Won	
Sansui Viewers' Choice Movie Awards	3 June 2001	Best Supporting Actress	Jaya Bachchan	Nominated	
Screen Awards	20 January 2001	Best Actress	Karisma Kapoor	Nominated	
Screen Awards	20 January 2001	Best Music Director	Anu Malik	Nominated	
Screen Awards	20 January 2001	Best Lyricist	Gulzar for "Tu Fiza Hai"	Nominated	
Screen Awards	20 January 2001	Best Male Playback	Udit Narayan for "Aaja Mahiya"	Nominated	
Screen Awards	20 January 2001	Best Choreography	Ganesh Hegde	Nominated	
Screen Awards	20 January 2001	Best Cinematography	Santosh Sivan	Nominated	
Screen Awards	20 January 2001	Most Promising Newcomer – Male	Bikram Saluja	Nominated	
Zee Cine Awards	3 March 2001	Best Actor – Male	Hrithik Roshan	Nominated	
Zee Cine Awards	3 March 2001	Best Actor – Female	Karisma Kapoor	Nominated	
Zee Cine Awards	3 March 2001	Zee Premiere Choice – Female	Karisma Kapoor	Won	
Zee Cine Awards	3 March 2001	Best Actor in a Supporting Role – Female	Jaya Bachchan	Won	
Zee Cine Awards	3 March 2001	Best Male Debut	Bikram Saluja	Nominated	
