= Kruti Mahesh =

Indian dancer and choreographer

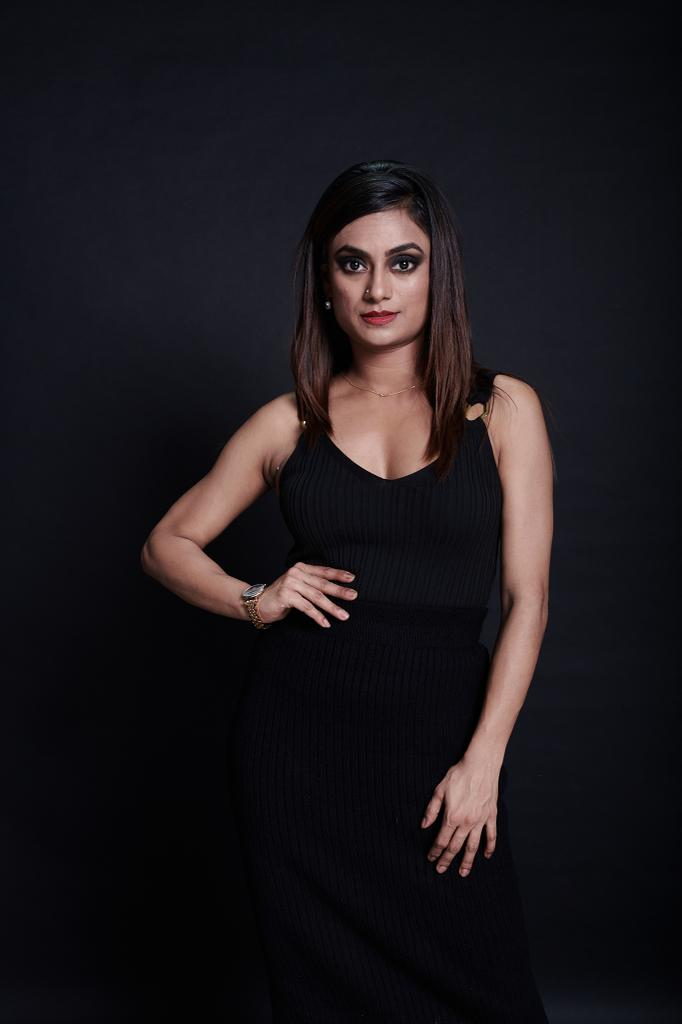
- Kruti Mahesh
- Born: Matunga, Mumbai
- Occupation: Choreographer
- Years active: 2009–present
- Style: Classical, Bollywood, Hip Hop

Kruti Mahesh is an Indian dancer and choreographer known for her work in Hindi Cinema. She is a recipient of the National Film Award for Best Choreography for the song "Ghoomar" from Padmaavat (2018), together with Jyoti D.Tommar, and has received the Filmfare Award for Best Choreography for "Dholida" from Gangubai Kathiawadi (2022). Her best works are in Yeh Jawaani Hai Deewani (2013), ABCD 2 (2013), Bajirao Mastani (2015), A Flying Jatt (2016), Race 3 (2018), Street Dancer 3D (2019), Shyam Singha Roy (2021), and Maja Ma (2022). Terence Lewis has been her mentor since joining his team in Dance India Dance and has assisted Remo D'Souza along the way before becoming an independent choreographer.

== Early life and career ==
Born into a Tamil Brahmin family in Matunga, Mumbai, Kruti joined dance class as a 5-year-old and performed her Arangetram at the age of 14. She attended Mumbai University and, after graduation, travelled to London, where she attended London South Bank University, obtaining a Masters in Forensic Science, and then returned to Mumbai due to her father's health issues. Her father encouraged her to pursue her passion for dance, which inspired her to compete in dance contests. She also worked as an embryologist at a clinic.

She was a contestant on Dance India Dance Season 2 (2009), joining Terence Lewis and gaining her recognition. She continued to be part of dance shows, serving as a skipper in DID Li'l Master season 2 under the team Kruti Ke Kracters and Om Chetri from her team, finishing as the runner-up of the show. She became part of Dance Ke Superkids, and was the choreographer along with Prince Gupta for Team Yahoo, which was led by Raghav Juyal, and the team won the competition with Faisal Khan, Soumya Rai, Rohan Parkale, Om Chetri, Jeet Das, Shalini Moitra, and Tanay Malhara as contestants in their team.

She assisted Remo D'Souza in the song "Balam Pichkari" from Yeh Jawaani Hai Deewani. She continued assisting him in several films, among which were "Pinga" and "Deewani Mastani" in Sanjay Leela Bhansali's Bajirao Mastani. The success of the songs led Bhansali to offer her independent choreography for his next film, Padmaavat. The song eventually became "Ghoomar", which was based on a traditional folk dance that originated in Rajasthan under the same name. Ghoomar, traditionally performed by the Bhil tribes was later adopted by the Rajputs. Jyothi D. Tomar, an exponent in ghoomar worked with her on the project. The song and its dance, where Deepika Padukone who featured as a Rajput princess, danced to it, received widespread critical acclaim. She received the National Film Award for Best Choreography at the 66th National Film Awards along with Tomar and won several awards for best choreography.

She choreographed all the songs from Race 3 along with Rahul Shetty and Remo D'Souza and also in Street Dancer 3D, where two of its songs, "Illegal Weapon" and "Nachi Nachi" received Filmfare nominations for Best Choreography. "Gharmi" was another dance from the film by her that featured Nora Fatehi. "Ghani Cool Chori", a garba from Rashmi Rocket' and the Punjabi dance "Jee Ni Karda" from Sardar Ka Grandson were among her other songs. She choreographed Sai Pallavi in the song "Pranavalaya" from Shyam Singha Roy. The dance which had elements of Bharatanatyam, Odissi and Mohiniyattam, became popular upon release.

She collaborated with Bhansali in Gangubai Kathiawadi' for the songs "Dholida" and "Jhume Re Go" based on Garba, danced by Alia Bhatt which met with critical acclaim. She received the award for the Best Choreography for "Dholida" at the 68th Filmfare Awards.

She collaborated with Madhuri Dixit in the film Maja Ma (2022) for the song "Boom Padi", a foot tapping Garba in a festive setting and worked on a Bhangra track for the Punjabi film, Godday Godday Chaa.

== Filmography ==
Year	Film	Song	Notes	Ref
2013	Yeh Jawaani Hai Deewani	"Balam Pichakari"	Debut	
2013	ABCD 2	"Sun Saathiya"		
2015	Bajirao Mastani	"Pinga", "Deewani Mastani"		
2016	A Flying Jatt	"Toota Joh Kabhi Tara Sajna", "Bhangra Paa", "Flying Jatt"		
2018	Padmaavat	"Ghoomar", "Ek Dil Ek Jaan", "Holi Song"		
2018	Race 3	All songs	with Rahul Shetty and Remo D'Souza	
2019	Malaal			
2019	Commando 3	"Ankhiyan Ladavan"		
2019	Kalank			
2020	Indoo Ki Jawani			
2020	Street Dancer 3D	"Lahore", "Garmi", "Illigal Weapon 2.0", "Mile Sur", "Muqabla 2.0"	with Rahul Shetty	
2021	Tuesdays and Fridays			
2021	Sardar Ka Grandson	"Jeeni Karda"		
2021	Rashmi Rocket	"Ghani Cool Chori"		
2021	The Empire			
2021	Shyam Singha Roy	"Pranavalaya"		
2022	Gangubai Kathiawadi	"Jhume Re Go", "Meri Jaan", "Dholida"		
2022	Maja Ma	"Boom Padi"		
2023	Jubilee	"Dariyacha Raja", "Vo Tere Mere Ishq Ka"		
2023	Maharashtra Shahir	"Baharla Ha Madhumaas"		
2023	Godday Godday Chaa	"Allarhan De"		

=== Television appearance ===
Year	Show	Notes	Ref
2009	Dance India Dance Season 2	Contestant	
2011	Dance Ke Superkids	Skipper	
2012	Dance India Dance Lil Masters	Skipper	
2014	Jhalak Dikhhla Jaa	Choreographer	
2021	Mi Honar Superstar	Judge	
2023	Heeramandi	choreographer	

== Awards ==
Year	Category	Award	Song	Film	Notes	Ref
2019	National Film Award for Best Choreography	National Film Awards	"Ghoomar"	Padmaavat	with Jyothi D. Tomar	
2019	Best Choreography	Zee Cine Awards	"Ghoomar"	Padmaavat	with Jyothi D. Tomar	
2019	Best Choreography	Screen Awards	"Ghoomar"	Padmaavat	with Jyothi D. Tomar	
2019	IIFA Award for Best Choreography	International Indian Film Academy Awards	"Ghoomar"	Padmaavat	with Jyothi D. Tomar	
2023	Best Choreography	Filmfare Awards	"Dholida"	Gangubai Kathiawadi		
2024	Best Choreographer	Zee Chitra Gaurav Puraskar	"Baharla Ha Madhumas"	Maharashtra Shahir		
