= Rahul Shetty =

Indian dancer and choreographer

- Born: Mangalore, Karnataka, India
- Occupation: Choreographer
- Years active: 2011–present
- Style: Hip Hop, Lyrical Hip Hop

Rahul Shetty is an Indian dancer and choreographer known for his works in Hindi cinema in ABCD 2 (2015), A Flying Jatt (2016), Race 3 (2018), Baaghi 2 (2018), Zero (2018), Housefull 4 (2019), Street Dancer 3D (2020) and Heropanti 2 (2022). He has frequently worked with Tiger Shroff. He collaborated with Prabhu Deva in "Happy Hour" from ABCD 2 along with Paul Marshal and in Street Dancer 3D for "Muqabla 2.0". He in association with Kruti Mahesh, received Filmfare nominations for Best Choreography for the tracks "Illegal Weapon" and "Nachi Nachi" from Street Dancer 3D. Ahmad Khan and Remo D'Souza have been his mentors.

== Early life and career ==
Shetty hails from Mangaluru and relocated to Mumbai to pursue his passion for dancing. He started dancing at the age of 6 and became a child artist for a year in the show Kya Masti Kya Dhoom on Star Plus. He was a contestant in the DID Doubles with Roza, which gained him recognition. He then became part of shows like Krazzy Kiya Re and Nach Baliye. He then teamed up with a fellow contestant from Dance India Dance, Paul Marshal Cardoz, and formed the duo Rahul N Paul. They popularised lyrical hip-hop on Indian television shows along with another Dance India Dance contestant, Raghav Juyal. They served as the captains for the show DID Lil Masters season 3 under the team Rapchik Punters. Sadhwin Shetty, from their team, advanced to be one of the finalists of the show.

He has worked with international artists, and he conducts various dance workshops in the country. He assisted Ahmad Khan and Remo D'Souza in several films notably Raabta for the song "Main Tera Boyfriend" and Nawabzaade for the song "High Rated Gabru".

He collaborated with Tiger Shroff starting in 2014, beginning with "Zindagi Aa Raha Hoon Main" assisting Ahmad Khan, becoming an independent choreographer for Shroff's films A Flying Jatt and Baaghi 2, and then joining Heropanti 2. He worked in Shroff's single music videos "Vandematharam" and "Poori Gal Baat" featuring Mouni Roy.

He worked with Prabhu Deva in ABCD 2 (2013) on the song "Happy Hour" and also danced along in the video with Paul Marshal Cardoz. He choreographed all the songs for the film Street Dancer 3D (2020), particularly with Prabhu Deva in Muqabala 2.0 reprised from Humse Hai Muqabala (1994). In the song, which was originally choreographed by Raju Sundaram, Shetty made sure that his name was also in the credits.

His other single music videos to hit were "Chamiya" featuring Shakti Mohan and Dwayne Bravo, "Kurta Pajama" with Tony Kakkar and Shehnaaz Gill and "Garbe Ki Raat" with Bhoomi Trivedi, Rahul Vaidya and Nia Sharma.

== Discography ==
=== Film ===
Key
†	Denotes films that have not yet been released

Year	Film	Song(s)	Notes	Ref
2015	ABCD 2	"Happy Hour"		
2016	A Flying Jatt	"Beat Pe Booty"	with Paul Marshal Cardoz	
2017	Kaabil			
2018	Race 3	All songs	with Kruti Mahesh and Remo D'Souza	
2018	Zero			
2018	Baaghi 2	"Mundiyan"		
2019	Kalank			
2019	Housefull 4			
2020	Street Dancer 3D	All songs	with Kruti Mahesh	
2022	Heropanti 2	"Miss Hairan"		
2026	Rahu Ketu	All songs	with Remo D'Souza	
2026	Welcome to the Jungle †	TBA		
2026	Dhamaal 4 †	TBA		

=== Singles ===
Year	Song	Artists	Ref
2019	"Chamiya"	Shakti Mohan and Dwayne Bravo	
2020	"Kurta Pajama"	Tony Kakkar and Shehnaaz Gill	
2022	"Poori Gal Baat"	Mouni Roy and Tiger Shroff	
2022	"Vandematharam"	Tiger Shroff	
2023	"Garbe Ki Raat"	Bhoomi Trivedi, Rahul Vaidya and Nia Sharma	

=== Television appearances ===
- Kya Masti Kya Dhoom as contestant
- DID Doubles (2011) as contestant
- Krazzy Kiya Re as contestant
- Nach Baliye as choreographer
- dance plus season 7 as a captain (2025)

=== Film appearances ===
- ABCD: Any Body Can Dance (2013) as Rahul
