= Dance India Dance: Battle of the Champions =

Indian television reality series

- Hosted by: ~~Dheeraj Dhoopar~~; Karan Wahi
- Judges: Kareena Kapoor Khan; Bosco Martis; Raftaar
- Winner: Unreal Crew
- Runner-up: I Am Hip-Hop
- No. of episodes: 30

Release
- Original network: Zee TV; ZEE5
- Original release: 22 June – 29 September 2019

DID: Battle Of The Champions or Dance India Dance Season 7 is the seventh season of Dance India Dance that premiered on 22 June 2019 with a unique concept.

== Judges ==
- Kareena Kapoor Khan
- Bosco Martis
- Raftaar

== Top 5 Finalists ==
Sr.	Artists	Type	Style	Team	Finish
1	Unreal Crew	Group	Tutting and Animation	North Ke Nawabs	Winner
2	I Am Hip-Hop	Group	Hip-Hop	South Ke Thalaivas	Runner-Up
3	Kuldeep & Pranshu	Duo	Lyrical	West Ke Singhams	2nd Runner-Up
4	Mukul Gain	Solo	Contemporary	East Ke Tigers	3rd Runner-Up
5	Akshay Pal	Solo	Popping	West Ke Singhams	4th Runner-Up

== Team Bhawna Khanduja (North Ke Nawabs) ==
Sr.	Artists	Type	Style	Status	Date of Elimination
1	Unreal Crew	Group	Tuttmation (Tutting & Animation)	Winner	-
2	Malka Parveen	Solo	Freestyle & Hip-Hop	Eliminated	21 July 2019
3	Hardik Rawat	Solo	Contemporary & Hip-Hop	Quit	28 July 2019
4	N-House Crew	Group	Freestyle	Eliminated	22 September 2019

== Team Palden Lama Mawroh/Nirmal Tamang (East Ke Tigers) ==
Sr.	Artists	Type	Style	Status	Date of Elimination
1	Mukul Gain	Solo	Contemporary	3rd Runner-Up	-
2	Nrutya Naivedya	Group	Odissi	Eliminated	7 July 2019
3	Pop & Flex	Solo	Popping	Eliminated	14 July 2019
4	M.D.Hasan	Solo	B-Boying	Eliminated	28 July 2019
5	Richika Sinha	Solo	Contemporary	Eliminated	8 September 2019

== Team Paul Marshal (West Ke Singhams) ==
Sr.	Artists	Type	Style	Status	Date of Elimination
1	Pranshu & Kuldeep	Duo	Lyrical	2nd Runner-Up	-
2	Akshay Pal	Solo	Popping	4th Runner-Up	-
3	Saakshi & Shambhavi	Duo	Freestyle	Eliminated	11 August 2019
4	Akash & Suraj	Duo	Freestyle	Eliminated	18 August 2019
5	Kings Squad	Group	Hip-Hop	Eliminated	1 September 2019
6	Mansi Dhruv	Solo	Bollywood	Eliminated	22 September 2019

== Team Sneha Kapoor (South Ke Thalaivas) ==
Sr.	Artists	Type	Style	Status	Date of Elimination
1	I Am Hip-Hop	Group	Hip-Hop	Runner-Up	-
2	Ramya And Bhaskar	Duo	Freestyle	Eliminated	7 July 2019
3	Loyala Dream Team	Group	Hip-Hop and Urban Choreography	Eliminated	14 July 2019
4	Anil and Tejas	Duo	Freestyle	Eliminated	21 July 2019
5	The Soul Queens	Group	Bollywood & Hip-Hop	Eliminated	25 August 2019

== Winner of the Week ==
Week	Winner	Average
1	East Ke Tigers	99.0
2	North Ke Nawabs	98.7
3	West Ke Singhams	99.5
4	East Ke Tigers	99
5	South Ke Thalaivas	99.7
6	South Ke Thalaivas	99.4
7	South Ke Thalaivas	99.7
8	West Ke Singhams	99.6
9	South Ke Thalaivas	100
10	South Ke Thalaivas	99
11	West Ke Singhams	100
11	North Ke Nawabs	100
12	East Ke Tigers	100

== See also ==
- Dance India Dance
- Dance Deewane
- Super Dancer
- Dance Bangla Dance
