= Jhalak Dikhhla Jaa season 9 =

Jhalak Dikhhla Jaa
- Season 9
- Hosted by: Manish Paul
- Judges: Karan Johar; Jacqueline Fernandez; Ganesh Hegde; Farah Khan
- No. of contestants: 18
- Celebrity winner: Teriya Magar
- Professional winner: Aryan Patra
- Winning mentor: Rishikayash Jogdaand
- No. of episodes: 26

Release
- Original network: Colors TV
- Original release: 30 July 2016 – 21 January 2017

Season chronology
- ← Previous; Season 8 Next → Season 10

Jhalak Dikhhla Jaa 9 is the ninth season of the dance reality show, Jhalak Dikhhla Jaa. It premiered on 30 July 2016 on Colors. The season was hosted by Manish Paul and judged by Jacqueline Fernandez, Karan Johar, Ganesh Hegde and Farah Khan. The season ran from 30 July 2016 to 21 January 2017. This season's winner was Teriya Magar.

== Format ==
Jhalak Dikhhla Jaa has no audience voting in this season. Eviction is based on two specific criteria: judges' scores and the live studio audience scores. In semi finale, it was announced that audience can vote for the winner. Voting lines were open only for five days. Thus, now the elimination is done right in the end of the episode, unlike the previous seasons where elimination would be done in the beginning of next week's episode.

== Production ==
Judges for Jhalak Dikhhla Jaa Series 9

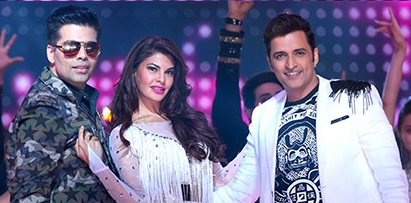
Jacqueline Fernandez, Karan Johar and Ganesh Hegde

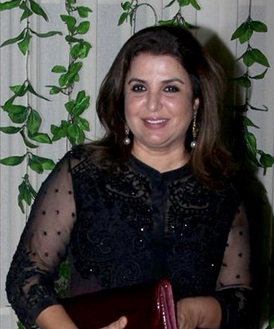
Farah Khan replaced Hegde

The series was announced in March 2016. In May 2016, Manish Paul was confirmed to return as the presenter of the series. In June 2016, Jacqueline Fernandez, Karan Johar and Ganesh Hegde were confirmed as the judges.

In September 2016, Govinda replaced Johar for one episode. Farah Khan replaced Hegde in November 2016

The channel released its first promo in June 2016. Later the series released another promo introducing its first to contestants Karishma Tanna and Surveen Chawla.

== Professional dancers ==
In June 2016, announced that Bhavna Khanduja, Rajit Dev, Cornel Rodrigues, Jai Kumar Nair, Sanam Johar, Alisha Singh,, Diwakar Nayal and would be returning to the series. Pranalini Atul and Bhavna Purohit were also announced to be making their debut as professionals in the series.

In mid July 2016, Aishwarya Radhakrishnan was added to the list and would be making her debut as a professional where she was paired opposite participant Salman Yusuff Khan.

In August 2016, Sidhant Gupta's choreographer Pranalini injured herself and quit the series while she got replaced by Sneha Singh.

== Cast ==
The series features twelve celebrity contestants. On 2 June 2016, the first two celebrities were announced as participants that were Karishma Tanna and Surveen Chawla. The final line up was revealed on 23 June 2016.

In October 2016, five new entries were announced including Gracy Goswami, Siddharth Nigam and Teriya Magar.

Celebrity	Notability	Professional Partner	Status	Ref.
Gaurav Gera	Comedian	Diwakar Nayal	Eliminated 1st on 13 August 2016	
Priyanka Shah	Dancer	Poonam Shah	Eliminated 2nd on 22 August 2016	
Harpal Singh Sokhi	Celebrity Chef	Bhavna Purohit	Eliminated 3rd on 27 August 2016	
Helly Shah	Swaragini – Jodein Rishton Ke Sur actress	Jai Kunar Nair	Eliminated 4th on 3 September 2016	
Sidhant Gupta	Actor and model	Pranalini Atul /Sneha Singh	Eliminated 5th on 3 September 2016	
Arjun Bijlani	Naagin actor	Bhavna Khanduja	Eliminated 6th on 1 October 2016	
Surveen Chawla	Bollywood and Punjabi actress	Sanam Johar	Eliminated 7th on 1 October 2016	
Gracy Goswami	Balika Vadhu actress	Sachin Sharma	Eliminated 9th on 5 November 2016	
Nora Fatehi	Bollywood actress and Bigg Boss star	Cornel Rodrigues	Eliminated 10th on 12 November 2016	
Spandan Chaturvedi	Udaan actress	Hardik Bora	Eliminated 11th on 19 November 2016	
Shakti Arora	Meri Aashiqui Tum Se Hi actor	Suchitra Sawant	Eliminated 12th on 26 November 2016	
Karishma Tanna	Actress and Bigg Boss runner-up	Rajit Dev	Eliminated 13th on 10 December 2016	
Swasti Nitya	Dancer	Preetjot Dayal	Eliminated 14th on 19 December 2016	
Nandish Sandhu	Uttaran actor	Shampa Gopikrishna	Not Selected on 24 December 2016	
Rimi Sen	Bollywood actress	Dhiraj Bhakshi	Not Selected on 24 December 2016	
Dwayne Bravo	Cricketer	Bhavna Purohit	Withdrew on 14 January 2017	
Siddharth Nigam	Actor	Vaishnavi Patil	Eliminated 15th on 14 January 2016	
Shantanu Maheshwari	Actor & dancer	Alisha Singh	Third place on 21 January 2017	
Salman Yusuff Khan	Dancer	Aishwarya Radhakrishnan	1st Runners-up on 21 January 2017	
Teriya Magar	Dancer	Aryan Patra	Eliminated 8th on 22 October 2016	
Teriya Magar	Dancer	Aryan Patra	Winners on 21 January 2017	

== Score chart ==
The highest score each week is indicated in bold green with a dagger (†), while the lowest score each week is indicated in italic red with a double-dagger (‡).

Colour key:

Winners
Runners-up
Third place
Fourth place
Bottom two/three/four
Eliminated
Withdrew from competition

Jhalak Dikhhla Jaa (season 9) - Weekly Scores
Couple	Pl.	Week																											
Couple	Pl.	1	2	1+2	3	4	5	6	7	8	9	6+7+8+9	10	11	12	11+12	13	14	15	16	17	16+17	18	19	20	21	22	19+20+21+22	23
Teriya & Aryan	1st												21‡ (Note: This couple was eliminated.)							**30**†	**30**†	**60**†	**30**†	25	26‡	20	**50**† (Note: This couple was in the bottom two/three/four, but was not eliminated.)	121	38‡ (Note: This couple finished in first place.)
Salman & Aishwarya	2nd	**25**†	**30**†	**55**†	**30**†	**29**†	**30**†	**30**†	**30**†	**30**†	**30**†	**120**†	**28**†	**30**†	**30**†	**60**†	25	**30**†	**30**†	**30**†	29	59	**30**†	**27**†	29	**18**†	45	119	**40**† (Note: This couple finished in second place.)
Shantanu & Alisha	3rd	23	28	51	26	26	26	28	**30**†	29	**30**†	117	27	27	26	53	28	**30**†	27	28	**30**†	58	28	24‡	**30**†	17‡	49	121	38‡ (Note: This couple finished in third place.)
Siddharth & Vaishnavi	4th												**30**†	27	25	51	25	**30**†	25	27‡	27‡	54	27	23‡	**30**†	20	43‡	116	
Dwayne & Bhavna P	5th																								25	16	(Note: This couple withdrew from the competition.)		
Swasti & Preetjot	6th												23	20‡	26	46	26	29	**30**†	29	26	55	22‡						
Karishma & Rajit	7th	22	26	48	27	24	28	28	27	26	29	110	26	25	27	51	**30**†	27	26	28	27‡	55							
Shakti & Suchitra	8th	24	27	51	23	27	25	27‡	25	29	27	108	22	20‡	26	46	22	26	23‡										
Spandan & Hardik	9th												23	22	24	46	27	25‡											
Nora & Cornel	10th	23	25	48	28	26	27	27‡	29	24	**30**†	110	25	24	23	47	21‡												
Gracy & Sachin	11th												22	23	21‡	25‡													
Arjun & Bhavna K	13th	21	21‡	42‡	27	27	27	28	24‡	22‡	25‡	99‡																	
Surveen & Sanam	12th	24	27	51	28	**29**†	**30**†	28	25	27	27	107																	
Helly & Jai	14th	21	22	43	24	24	23‡																						
Sidhant & Pranalini	15th	23	26	49	26	27	24																						
Harpal & Bhavini P	16th	22	24	46	25	21‡																							
Priyanka & Poonam	17th	24	22	46	21‡																								
Gaurav & Diwakar	18th	20‡	23	43																									

Notes

Red numbers indicates the lowest score.
Green numbers indicates the highest score.
indicates the winning couple.
indicates the runner-up couple.
indicates the third-place couple.
indicates the fourth-place couple.
indicates the couple eliminated that week.
indicates the returning couple that finished in the bottom three.
indicates the returning couple that finished in the bottom two.

== Dance chart ==
The couples performed the following each week:

Highest scoring dance
Lowest scoring dance
Non-scoring dance

Jhalak Dikhhla Jaa (season 9) - Dance chart
Couple	Weeks																					
Couple	1	2	3	4	5	6	7	8	9	10	11	12	13	14	15	16	17	18	19	20	21	22
Teriya & Aryan									Freestyle (Note: No scores were received for this dance.)	Freestyle					Krumping	Freestyle	Contemporary Freestyle	Aerial	Robotics & Classical	Lyrical	Bollywood	Freestyle
Salman & Aishwarya	Salsa	Kizomba	Freestyle	Tango & Krumping	Swing	Waltz	Acro gymnastics	Tandav	Freestyle	Bollywood	Bollywood	Aerial Freestyle	Freestyle	Flamenco & Bellydance	Bollywood	Bollywood	Freestyle	Freestyle	Freestyle	Freestyle	Salsa	Bollywood
Shantanu & Alisha	Freestyle	Hip-hop	Freestyle	Tango & Krumping	Bollywood	Bollywood	Freestyle	Bollywood	Street style hip-hop	Contemporary	Bollywood	Broadway jazz	Freestyle Hip-hop	Freestyle Robotics	Freestyle	Freestyle Hip-hop	Bollywood	Freestyle	Purulia Chhau	Hip-hop	Freestyle	Hip-hop
Siddharth & Vaishnavi									Freestyle	Freestyle	Freestyle	Freestyle	Bollywood	Freestyle	Freestyle	Freestyle	Contemporary	Freestyle	Freestyle	Contemporary	Freestyle	
Dwayne & Bhavna																			Bollywood	Bollywood	Bollywood	
Swasti & Preetjot									Bollywood	Bollywood	Freestyle	Odissi	Bollywood	Bollywood	Bollywood	Bollywood	Bollywood	Bollywood				
Karishma & Rajit	Freestyle	Freestyle	Freestyle	Bollywood	Bollywood	Freestyle	Hip-hop	Bollywood	Bharatnatyam	Bollywood	Semi-classical	Waltz	Bollywood	Cabaret	Freestyle	Mujra & Salsa	Tandav					
Shakti & Suchitra	Freestyle	Freestyle	Tango	Freestyle	Freestyle Broadway	Bollywood	Contortion & Bollywood	Lavni	Garba	Freestyle	Freestyle	Samba	Freestyle	Tollywood	Freestyle							
Spandan & Hardik									Bollywood	Freestyle	Bollywood	Bollywood	Bollywood	Bollywood	Bollywood							
Gracy & Sachin									Bollywood	Paso Doble	Semi-classical	Bollywood			Bollywood							
Nora & Cornel	Freestyle	Freestyle Reggae	Bollywood	Bollywood	Freestyle Belly Dance	Contemporary	Aerial	Bollywood	Tango	Freestyle	Bollywood	Bachata	Freestyle									
Arjun & Bhawna	Freestyle	Paso Doble	Tollywood	Freestyle	Freestyle	Bollywood	Bollywood	Freestyle	Robotics													
Surveen & Sanam	Freestyle & Bhangra	Freestyle	Kathak	Bollywood	Freestyle	Contemporary	Cabaret	Hip-hop	Afro													
Helly & Jai	Bollywood Freestyle	Freestyle	Freestyle	Bollywood & Salsa	Bollywood																	
Sidhant & Pranalini	Freestyle	Krumping	Samba	Bollywood	Bollywood																	
Harpal & Bhavini	Freestyle & Bhangra	Rock & Roll	Cha Cha	Bollywood & Salsa																		
Priyanka & Poonam	Bharatnatyam & Popping	Jazz & Bollywood	Bollywood & Hip-hop																			
Gaurav & Diwakar	Salsa	Cabaret																				

== Guest appearances ==
Week(s)	Episode(s)	Guest(s)	Note(s)	Ref.
Week 2	Episode 2	Mouni Roy	To support Arjun Bijlani	
Week 3	Episode 3	Mona Singh	To support Gaurav Gera	
Week 3	Episode 3	Anil Kapoor	To promote 24 (Season 2)	
Week 4	Episode 4	Tiger Shroff	To promote A Flying Jatt	
Week 5	Episode 5	Sonakshi Sinha	To promote Akira	
Week 5	Episode 5	Gaurav Gera	To support Salman Yusuff Khan	
Week 6	Episode 6	Govinda	In place of Karan Johar as judge	
Week 7	Episode 7	Katrina Kaif & Sidharth Malhotra	To promote Baar Baar Dekho	
Week 8	Episode 8	Amitabh Bachchan & Taapsee Pannu	To promote Pink	
Week 9	Episode 9	Riteish Deshmukh	To promote Banjo	
Week 12	Episode 10	Sushant Singh Rajput	To Promote M.S. Dhoni: The Untold Story	
Week 13	Episode 12	Sonu Sood & Prabhu Deva	To Promote Tutak Tutak Tutiya	
Week 14	Episode 13	Ranbir Kapoor	To Promote Ae Dil Hai Mushkil	
Week 15	Episode 14	Neha Saxena	To support Shakti Arora	
Week 17	Episode 16	Yuvraj Singh	To promote his NGO for cancer patients	
Week 18	Episode 17	Alia Bhatt	To promote Dear Zindagi	
Week 19	Episode 18	Vidya Balan	To promote Kahaani 2	
Week 20	Episode 21	Badshah	Special appearance	
Week 21	Episode 24	Kunwar Amar	To dance with Shantanu Maheshwari in Teen ka Tadka special	
Week 21	Episode 24	Faisal Khan	To dance with Teriya Magar in Teen ka Tadka special	
Week 21	Episode 24	Puja Banerjee	To dance with Dwayne Bravo in Teen ka Tadka special	
Week 21	Episode 24	Sana Saeed	To dance with Salman Yusuff Khan in Teen ka Tadka special	
Week 21	Episode 24	Sumedh Mudgalkar	To dance with Siddharth Nigam in Teen ka Tadka special	
Week 22	Episode 26	Hrithik Roshan	To promote Kaabil	
