= India's Best Dramebaaz =

- Directed by: Arun Sheshkumar
- Presented by: Rithvik Dhanjani (season 1-2); Ragini Khanna (season 1); Ravi Dubey (season 2); Shantanu Maheshwari (season 3)
- Judges: Vivek Oberoi (season 1-3); Sonali Bendre (season 1-2); Anurag Basu (season 1); Sajid Khan (season 2); Huma Qureshi (season 3); Omung Kumar (season 3)
- Country of origin: India
- Original language: Hindi
- No. of seasons: 3
- No. of episodes: 31

Production
- Editor: Kumar Priyadarshi (Season 3)
- Running time: 45-60 minutes
- Production companies: Frames Production; Essel Productions

Original release
- Network: Zee TV
- Release: 23 February 2013 – present

Related
- Drama Juniors

India's Best Dramebaaz is a talent-search Indian reality television show on Zee TV which has children between the ages of 4–15 years as the participants. The show is produced by the Essel Productions.

== Concept ==
Unlike music and dance shows like SaReGaMaPa and Dance India Dance, India's Best Dramebaaz is focused on acting. The show hunts for kids who can show drama, performing a series of tasks to test their creativity, spontaneity and acting capabilities. Sonali, who has already judged a number of reality TV shows said "It is very difficult to judge children and I don't think we should judge them either. Instead, we are having so much fun. It is the naughtiness... there are so many little nuggets of information and amazing stories that come out. The kids talk so much, especially when they speak about their parents." On the day of its premiere, the show producers distributed mithai to the family, friends and relatives of all the new-born babies, that day. The process was carried out at the maternity wards across several municipal hospitals including the Grant Medical College and Sir Jamshedjee Jeejeebhoy Group of Hospitals, Topiwala National Medical College and Nair Hospital, St George Hospital, Mumbai, Neerjaa Children's Hospital, Cama Hospital in Mumbai and the Bhagwan Mahavir Hospital, Sanjay Gandhi Post Graduate Institute of Medical Sciences, Deendayal Upadhyaya and the ESI Hospital.

== Response ==
=== Anurag Basu ===
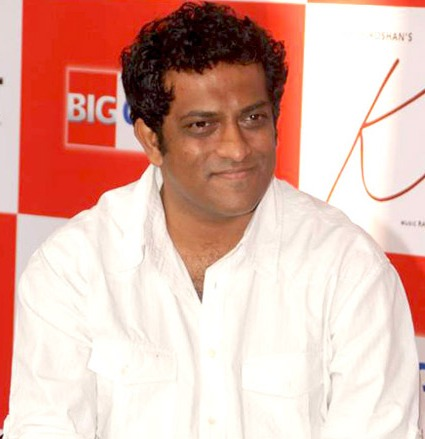
Anurag Basu

In an interview with Anurag Basu, he had voiced his opinion on India's Best Dramabaaz. He said "You know as a film maker, we tend to grow very detached to everything happening around. But kids help me stay young as a film maker. They keep me connected. And interacting with kids is anyway great fun. I live in a joint family, where there are loads of children, including my daughter. So, being with children is something I am comfortable with and enjoy too." Basu had expressed his interest in the show in many ways. He also said that it would be like re-living his childhood, while he judged the show. "I am working on my next script now and working with kids is inspiring for sure," he added.

=== Rithvik Dhanjani and Ragini Khanna ===
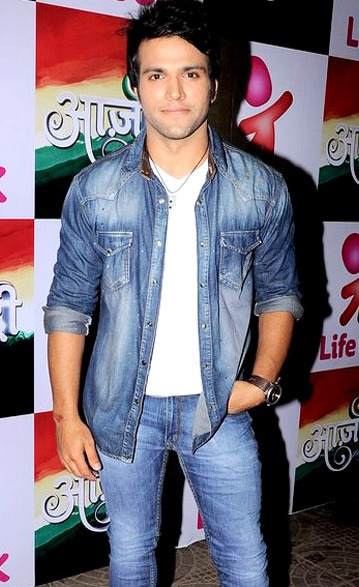
Rithvik Dhanjani (left) and Ragini Khanna (right).

Pavitra Rishta's second male lead Rithvik Dhanjani had expressed his interest in the show and agreed to host it. He said "My role in Pavitra Rishta has been widely appreciated and the show remains one of the top-rated shows. So, when they approached me to host India's Best Dramebaaz, it was difficult for me to turn down their offer. I am getting an opportunity to interact with so many talented children and the audience will get to see a more easy-going, fun-loving aspect of my personality." Ragini Khanna, who had appeared in many Hindi serials and reality shows on television like Radhaa Ki Betiyaan Kuch Kar Dikhayengi, Sasural Genda Phool and Jhalak Dikhhla Jaa said "After my stint on Star Ya Rockstar, I am back for a second inning on Zee and this time as the host of a show that's bound to be really high on its cuteness quotient. We're talking about kids here… you can only imagine the amount of fun we will have through the making."

=== Sonali Bendre and Vivek Oberoi ===
Sonali Bendre has also favoured the show, saying that a competition among kids is important as it helps bringing out the best in an individual. She said, it just had to be healthy in nature. While promoting the show in Mumbai, she said "I feel very strongly about overt competitiveness. The word competition has a narrow frame... it has to be healthy. The line is very thin. At the same time, I feel competition is necessary because children do revel and excel in it sometimes when they are put in adverse situations. But that does not mean parents need to put pressure[on children]." When Bendre was questioned about the feasibility of the programme and the negative side effects of shooting schedules, she said "as long as the parents are not putting the pressure, and the child is not feeling the pressure and enjoying the experience, the reality shows are a platform which gives [children] confidence."

Vivek Oberoi said that judging the show would remind him of his childhood. He was described as the biggest dramebaaz by the other two judges when he said "Once, I stole my teachers' lunch boxes, wiped off the food, filled the boxes with dead cockroaches and kept them back in their bags. I was a good student, but when I used the same intelligence to play mischief, it would be a disaster." He also said that when he had to reject a kid during the auditions, he would let Sonali do the dirty job, to which Sonali replied "Rejection is what parents teach them. If the kids are not told that they are losing out on something they don't realise or think about it. It is complete fun and adventure for them."

=== Ajay Bhalwankar ===
Zee TV Head of Content Ajay Bhalwankar said "This is basically a talent show which nobody has done so far. Zee TV has always excelled in talent shows. It is a prime time slot, wherein the entire family can sit and watch the show. And we want it to be watched by the entire family. The show is primarily about ‘dramebaaz’, people who are extraordinarily talented and innovative, that is what we are looking at." He said, that the channel has conducted auditions over a period of three months in cities like Mumbai, Delhi, Kolkata, Nagpur, Patna, Bhopal, Chandigarh, Jaipur, Ahmedabad, Indore, Lucknow, Ranchi and Dehradun.

== Season 1 ==
=== Judges ===
- Vivek Oberoi
- Sonali Bendre
- Anurag Basu

=== Hosts ===
- Rithvik Dhanjani
- Ragini Khanna

Participant Name	Age	From	Team
Aditya Singhal	12	Pune	Winner of India's Best Dramebaaz
Nihaar Gite	6	Shirdi	Finalist, Second rank
Praneet Sharma	5	Jaipur	Finalist, Third rank
Mehnaaz Maan	8	Mohali	Finalist, Fourth rank
Anjali Astha	10	Mohali	Finalist, Fifth rank
Chinmay Deshkar	12	Nagpur	Finalist
Avni Gupta	7	Dehradun	Eliminated on 12 May 2013
Gracy Goswami	9	Ahmedabad	Eliminated on 12 May 2013
Honey Khilwani	10	Adipur	Eliminated on 12 May 2013
Ravneet Kalra	11	Bhopal	Standby contestant brought in place of Abhishek on 4 May 2013 / Eliminated on 12 May 2013
Sayuri Haralkar	11	Mumbai	Eliminated on 12 May 2013
Tejaswini Deshmukh	10	Mumbai, originally from Akola	Eliminated on 12 May 2013
Abhishek Raj	10	Patna	Left the show on 4 May 2013 due to health issue
Anamitra Kumari	6	Jharkhand	Eliminated on 14 April 2013
Bhakti Dalvi	10	Pune	Eliminated on 14 April 2013
Rahul Phalke	11	Mumbai	Eliminated on 14 April 2013
Shruti Nigade	7	Pune	Eliminated on 14 April 2013
Yash Karan	11	Bhopal	Eliminated on 14 April 2013
Zenith Patel	6	Ahmedabad	Eliminated on 14 April 2013

- The winner of the season was Aditya Singhal.
- The first runner up was Nihaar Gite.
- Praneet Sharma was the second runner up. He had worked in the serial Shani.
- Mehnaaz Maan was seen in Ek Mutthi Aasmaan.
- Gracy Goswami was in Balika Vadhu and Bandhan. She also participated in Jhalak Dikhhla Jaa (season 9) and also made her debut in the movie Begum Jaan.

== Season 2 ==
India's Best Dramebaaz Season 2 started on 12 December 2015. Swasti Nitya was the winner of season 2.

=== Judges ===
- Sonali Bendre
- Vivek Oberoi
- Sajid Khan

=== Host ===
- Ravi Dubey
- Rithvik Dhanjani

=== Contestants ===
- Bibechna Gurung
- Divyansh Dwivedi
- Jaskaran Narula
- Kartikey Raj
- Kartikey Malviya - First Runner Up
- Mehnaz Mann
- Nitant Kaushik
- Parth Mehta
- Pranay Singh
- Preetjot Singh
- Saee Kamble
- Stuti Tiwari
- Swasti Nitya - Winner
- Tamanna Dipak
- Toshavee Kelkar
- Twinkle Sharma
- Vansh Maheshwari

== Season 3 ==
=== Judges ===
- Vivek Oberoii
- Huma Qureshi
- Omung Kumar

=== Host ===
- Shantanu Maheshwari
- Vighnesh Pande

Participant Name	Age	From	Notes
Dipali Borkar	10	Pune	Winner of India's Best Dramebaaz 3
Anish Railkar	12	Maharashtra	First Runner Up
Harsh Raj Lucky	8	Patna	Third Runner Up
RS Shrisa	10	Bangalore	Finalist, Fourth rank
Angelika Piplani	12	Jabalpur	Finalist, Fifth rank
Inayat Verma	6	Ludhiana	Finalist
Soham Verma	10	Solan	Eliminated on 30 September 2018
Snigdha Deshmukh	11	Akola	Eliminated on 30 September 2018
Garvit Parikh	5	Jaipur	Eliminated on 30 September 2018
Jyot Swaroop Singh Khalsa	5	Indore	Eliminated on 30 September 2018
Zoya Shah	11	Mumbai	Eliminated on 3 September 2018
Chitrali Tejpal	7	Manglore	Eliminated on 19 August 2018
Shubhangi Manhit	7	Nalbari	Eliminated on 12 August 2018
Arnav Kalkundari	6	Pune	Eliminated on 28 July 2018
Sarah Mahadani	6	Nagpur	Eliminated on 21 July 2018
Samridhi Rathod	7	Indore	Eliminated on 21 July 2018

- The winner Dipali Borkar was awarded golden Keeda trophy with a cheque of ₹5,00,000
- The first runner up Anish Railkar was awarded Silver keeda trophy with a cheque of ₹3,00,000
- The second runner up Harsh Raj Lucky was awarded Bronze keeda trophy with a cheque of ₹2,00,000
- The other finalists Inayat, RS Sheersa and Angelika were awarded a certificate along with a cheque of ₹1,00,000
