= Dance India Dance =

Indian TV dance competition

- Latest promotional poster for Season 7
- Also known as: DID
- Genre: Reality
- Created by: Ashish Golwalkar, Ranjeet Thakur, Bimal Unnikrishnan
- Written by: Ravikesh Vatsa, Gunjan Joshi (Season 5)
- Presented by: Jay Bhanushali; Saumya Tandon; Ishita Sharma; Sahil Khattar; Amruta Khanvilkar; Dheeraj Dhoopar; Karan Wahi
- Judges: Mithun Chakraborty; (head judge 2009-2018): Geeta Kapoor; Remo D'Souza; Terence Lewis; Shruti Merchant; Mudassar Khan; Feroz Khan; Punit Pathak; Gaiti Siddiqui; Marzi Pestonji; Mini Pradhan; Kareena Kapoor; Bosco Martis; Raftaar; Sonali Bendre; Mouni Roy
- Opening theme: "India, Dance India Dance"
- Country of origin: India
- Original language: Hindi
- No. of seasons: 7
- No. of episodes: 209

Production
- Camera setup: Multi-camera
- Running time: 60–65 minutes
- Production companies: Essel Vision Productions; Frames Production

Original release
- Network: Zee TV
- Release: 30 January 2009 – present

Related
- DID Li'l Masters; DID Doubles; DID Super Moms

Dance India Dance (also called by the acronym DID; tagline: Dance Ka Asli ID D.I.D.) is an Indian Hindi-language dance competition reality television series that airs on Zee TV, created and produced by Essel Vision Productions. It premiered on 30 January 2009. Here the judges are called Masters and Mithun Chakraborty was called Grand Master (until season 6). Season 7 premiered with a different concept. This show is a remake of the Bengali show Dance Bangla Dance which premiered on 2007. After 3 successful seasons of Dance Bangla Dance, Zee TV remade this show for all-over Indian participants.

The show features a format where dancers from a variety of styles enter open auditions held in Indian metropolitan cities to showcase their unique style and talents and, if allowed to move forward, are then put through mega-audition rounds of auditions to test their ability to adapt to different styles. At the end of mega audition, the top 18 dancers are chosen as finalists who move on to compete in the competition's main phase where they will perform solo, duet and group dance numbers in a variety of styles in competition for the votes of the broadcast viewing audience which, combined with the input of a panel of judges, determine which dancers will advance to the next stage from week to week.

The show features a variety of Indian cultural and international dance styles ranging across a broad spectrum of classical, Contemporary, Bollywood, Hip-hop, Jazz, Kalaripayattu, Salsa, and Musical theatre styles, among others, with many sub-genres within these categories represented. Competitors attempt to master these styles in an attempt to survive successive weeks of elimination and win a cash prize and often other awards, as well as the title of India's Best Dancer - CJ. The show is choreographed by Indian choreographers, such as Mudassar Khan, Marzi Pestonji, Tanuj Jaggi and Mini Pradhan. The show has won several television awards for Most Popular Dance Reality Show.

== Format ==
=== Selection process ===
The selection process can be further broken down into two distinct stages: the Open Auditions and the second phase referred to as the Mega Auditions.

The Open Auditions take place in 5–6 major Indian cities and are typically open to anyone aged 15–30 at the time of their audition. The cities in which auditions are held vary from season to season but some, such as New Delhi, Mumbai and Kolkata have featured in almost every season. During this stage, dancers perform a brief routine (typically individually) before three masters. The masters will then make an on-the-spot decision as to whether the dance demonstrated enough ability. If the dancer impressed the masters with his/her dancing abilities, masters will award a Hat called Taqdeer Ki Topi (Hat of Destiny), moving them instantly one step forward in the competition.

The second stage of the selection process, the Mega Auditions, is a several-day-long process in which the 100 hopefuls are tested for overall well-rounded dance, stamina, and their ability to perform under pressure. The dancers are put through a battery of rounds which test their ability to pick up various dance styles (typically some of the more well-represented genres that will later be prominent in the competition phase, such as hip-hop, Bollywood, jazz, Bharat Natyam, Kathak, Mohiniyattam, Odissi and Contemporary). At the end of this process, only the top 36 competitors will be chosen. The top 36 are then again asked to give solo performances, after which 18 are chosen in the final auditions. Then, those top 18 get divided into 3 teams which are named according to the 3 masters of the show such as, Mudassar Ki Mandali, Marzi Ke Mastane and Mini Ke Masterblasters. Each team containing 6 dancers then competes in the show, learning new skills throughout the journey.

=== Judges ===
Grand Master Mithun Chakraborty has been the head judge of the series. When any contestant performs an extraordinary performance, Grand Master gives him/her a salute. It's called Grand Salute and it is the highest respect for any contestant here. Every season, 3 Indian choreographers (who are called Coaches) choreograph the contestants and judge them with the Grand Master. The first three seasons were judged by Master Geeta Kapoor, Master Terence Lewis & Master Remo D'Souza with the Grand Master. When any contestant performs a perfect act, the judges give a special speech as a token of respect for the contestant.

List of the judges:

Rank	Name	Team	Duration	Seasons	Special speech	Best achievement
Grand Master (head judge)	Mithun Chakraborty	-	2009–18	1 - 6	Kya baat, kya baat, kya baat.	-
Master (judge)	Geeta Kapoor	Geeta Ki Gang	2009–12	1, 2, 3	Stupendo-fabulously-fantastic-phantasmogorically magical.	1st in season 3
Master (judge)	Terence Lewis	Terence Ki Toli	2009–12	1, 2, 3	Chummeshwari performance.	1st in season 2
Master (judge)	Remo D'Souza	Remo Ke Rangeelay	2009–12	1, 2, 3	That's what I call a performance.	1st in season 1
Master (judge)	Mudassar Khan	Mudassar Ki Mandali	2013–18	4, 5, 6	Chik chik boom fire.	1st in season 4
Master (judge)	Feroz Khan	Feroz Ki Fauz	2013–14	4	Ferocious performance.	3rd in season 4
Master (judge)	Shruti Merchant	Shruti Ke Shandar	2013–14	4	Jumbari jiri jiri jam jatak performance.	2nd in season 4
Master (judge)	Punit Pathak	Punit Ke Panthers	2015	5	Chamu performance.	1st in season 5
Master (judge)	Gaiti Siddiqui	Gaiti Ke Gangsters	2015	5	K.I.L.L.E.R performance.	2nd in season 5
Master (judge)	Marzi Pestonji	Marzi Ke Mastane	2017–18	6	Stand on Table (Note: Master Marzi stands on table to showing respect for a perfect performance.)	2nd in season 6
Master (judge)	Mini Pradhan	Mini Ke Masterblasters	2017–18	6	Tod diya, phod diya. (Note: Master Mini's full speech is Tod diya, phod diya, marod diya aur sabko peechey chhod diya.)	1st in season 6
Judge	Kareena Kapoor	-	2019	7	Wow performance and brings Dhool	-
Judge	Bosco Martis	-	2019	7	Zattak wala attack performance + confetti standing on the table.	-
Judge	Raftaar	-	2019	7	Dab	-

== Adaptations ==
1. Dance Bangla Dance (Zee Bangla)
2. Dance Maharashtra Dance (Zee Marathi)
3. Dance Karnataka Dance (Zee Kannada)
4. Dance Kerala Dance (Zee Keralam)
5. Dance Odisha Dance (Zee Sarthak)
6. Dance Tamizha Dance (Zee Tamil)
7. Dance Punjab Dance (Zee Punjabi)
8. Dance India Dance Telugu (Zee Telugu)

== Seasons ==
Season	Duration	No. of weeks	No. of episodes	Finalists					Presenters		Judge
Season	Duration	No. of weeks	No. of episodes	First place	Second place	Third place	Fourth place	5th place	Presenters		Judge
1	30 January – 30 May 2009	18	35	Salman Yusuff Khan	Alisha Singh	Siddhesh Pai	Jai Kumar Nair	—N/a	Jay Bhanushali	Saumya Tandon	Mithun Chakraborty
2	18 December 2009 – 23 April 2010	19	37	Shakti Mohan	Dharmesh Yelande	Punit Pathak	Binny Sharma	Kunwar Amarjeet Singh	Jay Bhanushali	Saumya Tandon	Mithun Chakraborty
3	24 December 2011 – 21 April 2012	18	35	Rajasmita Kar	Pradeep Gurung	Raghav Juyal	Sanam Johar	Mohena Singh	Jay Bhanushali	Saumya Tandon	Mithun Chakraborty
4	26 October 2013 – 22 February 2014	18	34	Shyam Yadav	Manan Sachdeva	Biki Das	Sumedh Mudgalkar	—N/a	Jay Bhanushali	Ishita Sharma	Mithun Chakraborty
5	27 June – 10 October 2015	16	31	Proneeta Swargiary	Nirmal Tamang	Sahil Adanaya	Kaushik Mandal	Ashish Vashistha	Jay Bhanushali	N/A (Note: There was no female host in season 5. Jay Bhanushali hosted alone that season.)	Mithun Chakraborty
6	4 November 2017 – 18 February 2018	16	31	Sanket Gaonkar	Sachin Sharma	Piyush Gurbhele	Nainika Anasuru	Shivam Wankhede	Sahil Khattar	Amruta Khanvilkar	Mithun Chakraborty
7	22 June 2019 – 29 September 2019	15	30	Unreal Crew	I Am Hip-Hop	Pranshu & Kuldeep	Mukul Gain	Akshay Pal	Karan Wahi; Dheeraj Dhoopar (First Episode)		Kareena Kapoor, Bosco Martis & Raftaar

indicates Geeta ki Gang
indicates Remo ke Rangeelay
indicates Terrence ki Toli
indicates Shruti ke Shandaar
indicates Mudassar ki Mandali
indicates Feroz ki Fauz
indicates Gaiti ke Gangsters
indicates Punit ke Panthers
indicates Mini ke Masterblasters
indicates Marzi ke Mastane
indicates North ke Nawabs
indicates East ke Tigers
indicates South ke Thalaivas
indicates West ke Singhams

== Hosts and judges ==
Judges	Season 1	Season 2	Season 3	Season 4	Season 5	Season 6	Season 7	Li'l Champs Season 1	Li'l Champs Season 2	Li'l Champs Season 3	Li'l Champs Season 4	Li'l Champs Season 5	Super Moms Season 1	Super Moms Season 2	Super Moms Season 3	Dance Ke Superstars	Dance Ke Superkids	Dance Ka Tashan
Mithun Chakraborty																		
Ahmed Khan																		
Bhagyashree																		
Bosco Martis																		
Chitrangada Singh																		
Geeta Kapoor																		
Farah Khan																		
Sandip Soparrkar																		
Siddharth Anand																		
Sonali Bendre																		
Shiamak Davar																		
Mudassar Khan																		
Terence Lewis																		
Govinda																		
Remo D'Souza																		
Feroz Khan																		
Marzi Pestonji																		
Punit Pathak																		
Gaiti Siddiqui																		
Mouni Roy																		
Raftaar																		
Urmila Matondkar																		
Shruti Merchant																		
Mini Pradhan																		
Kareena Kapoor																		
Jay Bhanushali																		
Rithvik Dhanjani																		
Vighnesh Pande																		
Karan Wahi																		
Sahil Khattar																		
Amruta Khanvilkar																		
Saumya Tandon																		
Shreya Acharya																		
Ishita Sharma																		
Manish Paul																		
Grand Judge Judge Host Contestant

== Season 1 ==
Dance India Dance
- Hosted by: Jay Bhanushali; Saumya Tandon
- Judges: Mithun Chakraborty (head judge); Geeta Kapoor; Terence Lewis; Remo D'Souza
- Winner: Salman Yusuff Khan
- Runner-up: Alisha Singh
- No. of episodes: 35

Release
- Original network: Zee TV
- Original release: 30 January – 30 May 2009

The first season started on 30 January 2009. This season was hosted by Jay Bhanushali and Saumya Tandon. The grand finale was aired on 30 May 2009 and winner was Salman Yusuff Khan.

Masters:

- Remo D'Souza, his team was named Remo Ke Rangeelay.
- Terence Lewis, his team was named Terence Ki Toli.
- Geeta Kapoor, her team was named Geeta Ki Gang.

Top 18 Contestants:

Remo Ke Rangeelay:

- Salman Yusuff Khan
- Prince R. Gupta
- Khushboo Purohit
- Mangesh Mondal
- Bhavana Purohit
- Rakhee Sharma

Terence Ki Toli:

- Alisha Singh
- Jai Kumar Nair
- Mayuresh Wadkar
- Vrushali Chavan
- Kiran Sutavne
- Shubho Das

Geeta Ki Gang:

- Siddhesh Pai
- Sunita Gogoi
- Paulson
- Mandakini Jena
- Nonie Sachdeva
- Jigar Ghatge

Finalists:

1. Salman Yusuff Khan (from Remo Ke Rangeelay) was the winner.
2. Alisha Singh (from Terence Ki Toli) was 1st runner-up.
3. Siddhesh Pai (from Geeta Ki Gang) was 2nd runner-up.
4. Jai Kumar Nair (from Terence Ki Toli) was 3rd runner-up.

== Season 2 ==
Dance India Dance
- Hosted by: Jay Bhanushali; Saumya Tandon
- Judges: Mithun Chakraborty (head judge); Geeta Kapoor; Terence Lewis; Remo D'Souza
- Winner: Shakti Mohan
- Runner-up: Dharmesh Yelande
- No. of episodes: 37

Release
- Original network: Zee TV
- Original release: 18 December 2009 – 23 April 2010

The second season started on 18 December 2009. This season was also hosted by Jay Bhanushali and Saumya Tandon. The grand finale was aired on 23 April 2010 and winner was Shakti Mohan.

Masters:

- Remo D'Souza, his team was named Remo Ke Rangeelay.
- Terence Lewis, his team was named Terence Ki Toli.
- Geeta Kapoor, her team was named Geeta Ki Gang.

Top 21 Contestants:

Remo Ke Rangeelay:

- Punit Pathak
- Bhavna Khanduja
- Nikkitasha Marwaha
- Shashank Dogra
- Meenu Panchal
- Naresh Mondal

Terence Ki Toli:

- Shakti Mohan
- Kunwar Amar
- Kruti Mahesh
- Parvez Rehmani
- Vandana
- Ameet
- Jack Gill (Wildcard)

Geeta Ki Gang:

- Dharmesh Yelande
- Binny Sharma
- Amrita Mitra (wildcard)
- Kishore Aman
- Tina Pradkar
- Altaf
- Shruti

Finalists:

1. Shakti Mohan (from Terence Ki Toli) was the winner.
2. Dharmesh Yelande (from Geeta Ki Gang) was 1st runner-up.
3. Punit Pathak (from Remo Ke Rangeelay) was 2nd runner-up.
4. Binny Sharma (from Geeta Ki Gang) was 3rd runner-up.

== Season 3 ==
Dance India Dance
- Hosted by: Jay Bhanushali; Saumya Tandon
- Judges: Mithun Chakraborty (head judge); Geeta Kapoor; Terence Lewis; Remo D'Souza
- Winner: Rajasmita Kar
- Runner-up: Pradeep Gurung
- No. of episodes: 35

Release
- Original network: Zee TV
- Original release: 24 December 2011 – 21 April 2012

The third season started on 24 December 2011. This season was also hosted by Jay Bhanushali and Saumya Tandon. The grand finale was aired on 21 April 2012 and winner was Rajasmita Kar.

Masters:

- Remo D'Souza, his team was named Remo Ke Rangeelay.
- Terence Lewis, his team was named Terence Ki Toli.
- Geeta Kapoor, her team was named Geeta Ki Gang.

Top 18 Contestants:

Remo Ke Rangeelay:

- Sanam Johar
- Mohena Singh
- Vaibhav Ghuge
- Lipsa Acharya
- Hardik Raval
- Manju Sharma

Terence Ki Toli:

- Pradeep Gurung
- Raghav Juyal (wildcard)
- Neerav Bavlecha (wildcard)
- Sneha Gupta
- Piyali Saha
- Varoon Kumar
- Sneha Kapoor
- Chotu Lohar

Geeta Ki Gang:

- Rajasmita Kar
- Abheek Banerjee
- Paul Marshal
- Urvashi Gandhi
- Riddhika Singh
- Shafeer

Finalists:

1. Rajasmita Kar (from Geeta Ki Gang) was the winner.
2. Pradeep Gurung (from Terence Ki Toli) was 1st runner-up.
3. Raghav Juyal (from Terence Ki Toli) was 2nd runner-up.
4. Sanam Johar (from Remo Ke Rangeelay) was 3rd runner-up.
5. Mohena Singh (from Remo Ke Rangeelay) was 4th runner-up.

== Season 4 ==
Dance India Dance
- Hosted by: Jay Bhanushali; Ishita Sharma
- Judges: Mithun Chakraborty (head judge); Mudassar Khan; Feroz Khan; Shruti Merchant
- Winner: Shyam Yadav
- Runner-up: Manan Sachdeva
- No. of episodes: 34

Release
- Original network: Zee TV
- Original release: 26 October 2013 – 22 February 2014

The fourth season started on 26 October 2013. This season was hosted by Jay Bhanushali and Ishita Sharma. The grand finale was aired on 22 February 2014 and winner was Shyam Yadav from Mudassar ki Mandli.

Masters:

- Mudassar Khan, his team was named Mudassar Ki Mandali.
- Shruti Merchant, her team was named Shruti Ke Shandar.
- Feroz Khan, his team was named Feroz Ki Fauj.

Top 11 Contestants:

Mudassar Ki Mandali:

- Shyam Yadav
- Swarali Karulkar
- Dhiraj Bakshi

Shruti Ke Shandar:

- Manan Sachdeva
- Sumedh Mudgalkar
- Shrishti Jain
- Suniketa Bore

Feroz Ki Fauj:

- Biki Das
- Arundhati Garnaik
- Ashutosh Pawar
- Sapna Suryawanshi

Finalists:

1. Shyam Yadav (from Mudassar Ki Mandali) was the winner.
2. Manan Sachdeva (from Shruti Ke Shandar) was 1st runner-up.
3. Biki Das (from Firoz Ki Fauj) was 2nd runner-up.
4. Sumedh Mudgalkar (from Shruti Ke Shandar) was 3rd runner-up.

== Season 5 ==
Dance India Dance
- Hosted by: Jay Bhanushali
- Judges: Mithun Chakraborty (head judge); Mudassar Khan; Punit Pathak; Gaiti Siddiqui
- Winner: Proneeta Swargiary
- Runner-up: Nirmal Tamang
- No. of episodes: 31

Release
- Original network: Zee TV
- Original release: 27 June – 10 October 2015

The fifth season started on 27 June 2015. This season was hosted by Jay Bhanushali. The grand finale was aired on 10 October 2015 and winner was Proneeta Swargiary.

Masters:

- Mudassar Khan, his team was named Mudassar Ki Mandali.
- Punit Pathak, his team was named Punit Ke Panthers.
- Gaiti Siddiqui, her team was named Gaiti Ke Gangsters.

Top 15 Contestants:

Mudassar Ki Mandali:

- Kaushik Mandal
- Saddam Hussain Sheikh
- Anuradha Iyengar
- Vicky Alhat
- Shruti Sinha

Punit Ke Panthers:

- Proneeta Swargiary
- Ashish Vashistha
- Sally Sheikh
- Pankaj Thapa
- Haroon Rao

Gaiti Ke Gangsters:

- Nirmal Tamang
- Sahil Adanaya
- Anila Rajan
- Shweta Poojari
- Priya Varunesh Kumar

Finalists:

1. Proneeta Swargiary (from Punit Ke Panthers) was the winner.
2. Nirmal Tamang (from Gaiti Ke Gangsters) was 1st runner-up.
3. Sahil Adanaya (from Gaiti Ke Gangsters) was 2nd runner-up.
4. Kaushik Mandal (from Mudassar Ki Mandali) was 3rd runner-up.
5. Ashish Vashistha (from Punit Ke Panthers) was 4th runner-up.

== Season 6 ==
Dance India Dance
- Hosted by: Amruta Khanvilkar; Sahil Khattar
- Judges: Mithun Chakraborty (head judge); Mudassar Khan; Marzi Pestonji; Mini Pradhan
- Winner: Sanket Gaonkar
- Runner-up: Sachin Sharma
- No. of episodes: 31

Release
- Original network: Zee TV
- Original release: 4 November 2017 – 18 February 2018

The sixth season was aired from 4 November 2017. This season is being hosted by Amruta Khanvilkar and Sahil Khattar.

Masters:

- Mudassar Khan, his team is named Mudassar Ki Mandali.
- Marzi Pestonji, his team is named Marzi Ke Mastane.
- Mini Pradhan, her team is named Mini Ke Masterblasters.

Top Contestants:

Mudassar Ki Mandali:

- Shivam Wankhede
- Paramdeep Singh
- Alphons Chetty
- Daphisha Kharbani
- Ria Chatterjee
- Deepak

Marzi Ke Mastane:

- Sachin Sharma
- Kalpita Kachroo
- Punyakar Upadhyay
- Shweta Warrier
- Shweta Sharda
- Rahul Burman

Mini Ke Masterblasters:

- Sanket Gaonkar
- Piyush Gurbhele
- Nainika Anasuru (Wildcard Entry)
- Sujan Marpa
- Deepak Hulsure (Wildcard Entry)
- Sonal Vichare
- Mitesh Roy
- Sarang Roy

Finalists:

1. Sanket Gaonkar (from Mini Ke Masterblasters) is the winner
2. Sachin Sharma (from Marzi Ke Mastane) is the first runner up
3. Piyush Gurbhele (from Mini Ke Masterblasters) is the second runner up
4. Nainika Anasuru (from Mini Ke Masterblasters) is the third runner up
5. Shivam Wankhede (from Mudassar Ki Mandali) is fourth runner up

== Season 7 ==
Dance India Dance
- Hosted by: Karan Wahi
- Judges: Kareena Kapoor; Bosco Martis; Raftaar
- Winner: Unreal Crew
- Runner-up: I Am Hip-hop
- No. of episodes: 30

Release
- Original network: Zee TV
- Original release: 22 June – 29 September 2019

The seventh season, entitled "Battle Of The Champions" started airing from 22 June 2019. This season was hosted by Karan Wahi. Unreal Crew of "North Ke Nawabs" emerged as the winner.

=== Judges ===
- Bosco Martis
- Kareena Kapoor Khan
- Raftaar

=== Zones Coaches ===
- Paul Marshal (West Ke Singhams)
  - Pranshu & Kuldeep (Lyrical) (2nd Runner-Up)
  - Akshay Pal (Popping) (4th Runner-Up)
  - Saakshi & Shambhavi (Freestyle) (Eliminated on 11 August 2019)
  - Akash & Suraj (Freestyle) (Eliminated on 18 August 2018)
  - Kings Squad (Hip-Hop) (Eliminated on 1 September 2019)
  - Mansi Dhruv (Bollywood) (Eliminated on 22 September 2019)
- Palden Lama Mawroh/Nirmal Tamang (East Ke Tigers)
  - Mukul Gain (Contemporary) (3rd Runner-Up)
  - Nrutya Naivedya (Odissi) (Eliminated on 7 July 2019)
  - Pop & Flex (Popping) (Eliminated on 14 July 2019)
  - M.D. Hasan (B-Boying) (Eliminated on 28 July 2019)
  - Richika Sinha (Contemporary) (Eliminated on 8 September 2019)
- Bhawna Khanduja (North Ke Nawabs)
  - Unreal Crew (Tuttmation - Tutting and Animation) (winner)
  - Malka Praveen (Hip-Hop and Freestyle) (Eliminated on 21 July 2019)
  - Hardik Rawat (Contemporary and Hip-Hop) (withdrew Due to Injury on 28 July 2019)
  - N-House Crew (Freestyle) (Eliminated on 22 September 2019)
- Sneha Kapoor (South Ke Thalaiwa)
  - I Am Hip-Hop (Hip-Hop) (runner-up)
  - Ramya & Bhaskar (Freestyle) (Eliminated on 7 July 2019)
  - Loyala Dream Team (Hip-Hop and Urban Choreography) (Eliminated on 14 July 2019)
  - Anil & Tejas (Freestyle) (Eliminated on 21 July 2019)
  - The Soul Queens (Bollywood and Hip-Hop) (Eliminated on 25 August 2019)

== Li'l Masters ==
Dance India Dance
- Also known as: DID Li'l Masters
- Genre: Reality
- Presented by: Manish Paul; Jay Bhanushali
- Judges: Mithun Chakraborty (head judge till season 3); Farah Khan; Sandip Soparrkar; Geeta Kapoor; Marzi Pestonji; Ahmed Khan; Siddharth Anand; Chitrangada Singh; Remo D'Souza; Sonali Bendre; Mouni Roy
- Opening theme: "D.I.D. Little Masters"
- Country of origin: India
- Original language: Hindi
- No. of seasons: 5

Production
- Camera setup: Multi-camera
- Running time: 1 hour

Original release
- Network: Zee TV
- Release: 30 April 2010 – present

=== Li'l Master season 1 ===
The first season of DID L'il Masters was judged by Farah Khan and Sandip Soparrkar. It was hosted by Manish Paul.

The four skippers were Jai (DID 1), Vrushali and Mayuresh (DID 1), Amrutha (DID 2), and Dharmesh (DID 2). Their teams were:

- Dharmesh ke Dhinchak: Jeetumoni Kalita, Vaishnavi Patil, Ruturaj Mahalim, Khyati Patel
- Jai ke Jhatang-Fatang: Vatsal Vithlani, Papiya Sarkar, Atul Banmoria, Divyam Viajyvergia
- Vrushali aur Mayuresh ke Dhum-Dhadake: Manoj Rathod, Hansika Singh, Avneet Kaur, Neel Shah
- Amritha ke Aflatoon: Anurag Sarmah, Khushabu Kargutkar, Shubham Maheshwari, Shivani Baranwal

==== Top 4 Finalists ====
- Jeetumoni Kalita (winner)
- Atul Banmoria (1st Runner Up)
- Vaishnavi Patil (2nd Runner Up)
- Manoj Rathod (3rd Runner Up)

=== Li'l Master season 2 ===
DID L'il Masters 2 was judged by Geeta Kapoor and Marzi Pestonji. It was hosted by Jay Bhanushali.

The four skippers were Prince (DID 1), Raghav (DID 3), Kruti (DID 2), and Neerav (DID 3). The teams were:

- Prince ke Paltan: Faisal, Shalini, Deep, Shreya
- Raghav ke Rockstars: Saummya, Rohan, Yash, Susanket
- Kruti ke Kracters: Om, Uday, Rimsha, Jnana
- Neerav ke Ninjas: Shreya, Tanay (WC), Jeet (WC), Rishi, Shivam

==== Top Finalists ====
- Faisal Khan (winner)
- Om Chetry (1st Runner Up)
- Rohan Parkale (2nd Runner Up)
- Saumya Rai (3rd Runner Up)

=== Li'l Master season 3 ===
The third season began broadcasting on 1 March 2014. Geeta Kapoor, Ahmad Khan, and Mudassar Khan were judges, along with Sanam Johar (did3), Raghav Crockroaz Juyal (did3),(Lil M2)/ Omkar Shinde, Rahul Shetty and Paul Marshal Cardoz (did3) and Swarali Karulkar (did1), as skippers. The teams were Raghav/Omkar ke Rockstar, Sanam ke Superheroes, Rahul and Paul ke Rapchik Punters and Swarali ke Sparklers. Teriya Magar from Nepal was declared the winner, and Anushka Chetry became the 1st runner-up. Sadhwin Shetty was the 2nd runner-up. Hardik Ruparel was declared the 3rd runner-up

=== Li'l Master season 4 ===
DID Li'l Masters returned with its 4th season after 4 years. It began broadcasting on 3 March 2018. Marzi Pestonji, Chitrangada Singh and Siddharth Anand were the judges along with Vaishnavi Patil (li'l M1),(JDJ5),(JDJ6),(JDJ7),(JDJ8),(JDJ9),(DC1),(DD3) Jitumoni Kalita (li'l M1), Tanay Malhara (Li'l M2),(D+2,) and Bir Radha Sherpa (li'l M2),(D+3),(DC1) as the skippers. The teams were divided into Vaishnavi Ke Veer, Jitumoni Ke Janbaaz, Tanay Ke Tigers and Bir Ke Baahubali. Jiya Thakur from Vaishnavi Ke Veer won the title. Urva Bhavsar from Jitumoni Ke Janbaaz finished as the first runner-up followed by Tamman Gamnu from Bir Ke Baahubali. The season was hosted by Jay Bhanushali and Vighnesh Pande.

=== Li'l Master season 5 ===
DID Li'l Masters returned with its 5th season. It began broadcasting on 12 March 2022 with Remo D'Souza, Sonali Bendre and Mouni Roy as the judges with Jay Bhanushali as the host. The skippers for the season are Paul Marshal (DID3),(DID7),(Li'l M2),(SD1),(SD2),(SD3),(SD4),(IBD1),(IBD2), Vartika Jha (DD1),(D+4),(IBD1), (SD4), (IBD2) and Vaibhav Ghuge (DID3),(SD1),(SD2),(SD3),(SD4),(IBD1),(IBD2).

=== Contestant Status ===
Contestants	Captain	Status	Place	Date of Elimination
Nabojit	Vaibhav	Winner	1st	26 June 2022
Appun	Vaibhav	1st Runner-Up	2nd	26 June 2022
Aadyashree	Vaibhav	2nd Runner-Up	3rd	26 June 2022
Sagar	Paul	3rd Runner-up	4th	26 June 2022
Rishita	Vaibhav	4th Runner-up	5th	26 June 2022
Sadiya	Vartika	Eliminated	6th-7th	18 June 2022
Aarav	Paul	Eliminated	6th-7th	18 June 2022
Mannsi	Vartika	Eliminated	8th	12 June 2022
Sanvi	Paul	Eliminated	9th	5 June 2022
Shristi	Vartika	Eliminated	10th	29 May 2022
Rupsa	Paul	Eliminated	11th	15 May 2022
Vighnesh	Paul	Eliminated	12th	1 May 2022
Atharv	Vaibhav	Eliminated	13th-15th	24 April 2022
Srushty	Vartika	Eliminated	13th-15th	24 April 2022
Anand	Vartika	Eliminated	13th-15th	24 April 2022

== Dance India Dance L'il Masters North America Edition ==
Auditions were conducted in April 2014 with over 10,000 contestants auditioning from all across the US, Canada and Europe. Out of them 10 contestants were chosen and were flown to Mumbai, India to compete in the finals. The winner was Akhil and the first runner-up was Avantika Vandanapu.

== Doubles ==
The shows consisted of 12 finalist couples. The Grand Finale was scheduled for filming 7 April 2011 at the Andheri Sports Complex for broadcast on 9 April 2011. Amit and Falon were voted the winners of the season, with Mithun Chakraborty crowning them with the ‘Taqdeer Ki Topi’.

== Super Moms ==
Dance India Dance
- Also known as: DID Super Moms
- Genre: Reality
- Presented by: Jay Bhanushali; Karan Wahi
- Judges: Mithun Chakraborty (head judge 2013); Farah Khan; Marzi Pestonji; Govinda; Geeta Kapoor; Terence Lewis; Remo D'Souza; Urmila Matondkar; Bhagyashree
- Opening theme: "D.I.D. Super Moms"
- Country of origin: India
- Original language: Hindi
- No. of seasons: 3

Production
- Camera setup: Multi-camera
- Running time: 1 hour

Original release
- Network: Zee TV
- Release: 1 June 2013 – present

=== Super Moms Season 1 ===
The first season started on 1 June 2013, where, Mithu Chakravarty from Kolkata was declared the winner of Dance India Dance Super Moms 2013 Season, while Cecille Rodrigues from Goa was the 1st runner-up, and Shraddha Shah Raj from Surat was the 2nd runner-up. The show was judged by Farah Khan and Marzi Pestonji. The finale was held in Surat.

=== Super Moms Season 2 ===
The second season started on 28 March 2015. Harpreet Khatri, who hails from Mumbai, was announced as the winner of Dance India Dance Super Moms Season 2 in 2015. Season 2 was anchored by popular TV actor Karan Wahi. Season 2 was judged by Geeta Kapoor, Govinda, and Terence Lewis.

=== Super Moms Season 3 ===
Season 3 was judged by Remo D'Souza, Bhagyashree & Urmila Matondkar and hosted by Jay Bhanushali. It started on 2 July 2022. This season was won by Varsha Bumra and her choreographer Vartika Jha.

== Special shows ==
=== Dance Ke Superstars ===
Dance Ke Superstars featured contestants from the first two seasons to compete against each other. The show was judged by choreographers Remo D'Souza and Shiamak Davar, and featured a guest judge every week. Team Jalwa, the Season 2 DID contestants, won the series.

=== Dance Ke Superkids ===
Dance ke Superkids- Battle of the Baaps! featured contestants from the first two seasons of DID L'iL Masters. It was judged by Geeta Kapoor, Farah Khan and Marzi Pestonji and hosted by Jay Bhanushali and Shreya Acharya. Team Yahoo, also known as DID L'il Masters Season 2, was led by Captain Raghav Juyal and choreographers: Kruti Mahesh and Prince Gupta. They won the competition with Faisal Khan, Soumya Rai, Rohan Parkale, Om Chetri, Jeet Das, Shalini Moitra and Tanay Malhara dancing their way to victory. Team Wakao, also known as DID L'il Masters Season 1, was led by Captain Dharmesh Yelande and choreographers: Mayuresh Vadkar and Vrushali Chavan; with dancing contestants: Jeetumoni Kalita, Vatsal Vithlani, Ruturaj Mahalim, Vaishnavi Patil, Atul Banmoria, Anurag Sarmah and Khyati Patel.

=== Dance Ka Tashan ===
DID Dance Ka Tashan featured contestants from Dance India Dance Super Moms competing against contestants from Dance India Dance L'il Masters 2. The show aired in November 2013 and was judged by choreographer Ahmed Khan and Geeta Kapoor and hosted by TV actor Rithvik Dhanjani and India's Best Dramebaaz contestant Nihar. The show was won by Team Todu, the DID L'il Masters Season 2 contestants, Faisal, Soumya, Rohan, Om, Shalini, Deep, Tanay, Jeet and Shreya.
