= Sahil Khattar =

Indian television presenter and YouTuber

- Born: 21 March 1991 (age 35)
- Occupations: YouTuber; actor; television host

YouTube information
- Channels: Khattarnaak; Being Indian
- Subscribers: 2.95 million
- Views: 538 million
- Last updated: 30 October 2024

Sahil Khattar (born 21 March 1991) is an Indian YouTuber, television host and actor. He works with two YouTube channels, named Khattarnaak and Being Indian. In 2007, he became a radio jockey and then joined the content creation company Being Indian. He then moved to mainstream TV with hosting television shows like Dance India Dance, India's Raw Star and India's Got Talent.

== Career ==
Khattar started his career as a radio jockey along with writing scripts for various acts. He became popular doing YouTube videos for Being Indian and also hosted television show Dance India Dance. He is also a sports enthusiast and has hosted sports events like Russia World Cup 2018 on Sony Ten 3 and live cricket show, India tour of England on Sony Liv.

He claims that actress Priyanka Chopra was the one which gave him an opportunity to write while he was hosting India’s Raw Star. He wrote for Shahrukh Khan, Salman Khan, Mukesh Ambani and Nita Ambani until he decided to say those lines by himself and move to YouTube and Television.

His latest show is The Expedition on Zing.

He is also playing Syed Kirmani in Kabir Khan's 83 which is based on the Indian Cricket team winning the 1983 world cup. This movie also stars Ranveer Singh and Deepika Padukone.

== Awards ==
- "Top 30 Under 30" (For Sahil’s energy and constant passion for work) presented by Hindustan Times.
- India’s Top 10 Super Stars, by The Economic Times.

== Filmography ==
| Year | Title | Role | Notes | Ref. |
|---|---|---|---|---|
| 2021 | 200 Halla Ho | Balli Chaudhary | | |
| 2021 | 83 | Syed Kirmani | | |
