= Proneeta Swargiary =

Indian dancer

- Swargiary with Punit Pathak in DID Season 5
- Occupations: Actress; Dancer; Choreographer; YouTuber
- Years active: 2015- Present
- Known for: Winner of DID Season 5

Proneeta Swargiary is an Indian dancer. She is the winner of the dance reality show DID Season 5. Originally from the Baksa Bodoland Territorial Region, in Assam, she later became a resident of Delhi after her family moved.

== Career ==
Swargiary participated in the fifth season of Dance India Dance. She was the winner of Dance India Dance 5 with the team of Punit Pathak, named “Punit Ke Panthers” and came into limelight with her performance on “Hoto Pe Bas Tera Naam Hai”. The sole reason for her participating in Dance India Dance was her love for dance. She was also in India's Got Talent and She was also a competitor in Dance Champions, from which she was later eliminated.
