= Dance Champions =

- Genre: Dance
- Created by: Urban Brew Studios
- Presented by: Raghav Juyal; Ridhima Pandit
- Judges: Remo D'Souza; Terence Lewis
- Country of origin: India

Production
- Running time: 60 minutes
- Production companies: Frames Production; Urban Brew Studios

Original release
- Network: STAR Plus
- Release: 30 September – 23 December 2017

Dance Champions is a dance competition reality television series that was telecasted on 30 September 2017, on Star Plus. This show is produced by Urban Brew. This dance show divides the contestants into few teams which are mentored by a professional dancer Punit Pathak.

Dance Champions features champion dancers who won or were runners-up in different shows. Moreover, new challengers will also join them and can beat them by displaying their further level dance moves.

Bir Radha Sherpa is the winner of the show.

== Concept ==
There are two kinds of participants, half of the participants are champions of other dance shows and half are runners up. Every week, there will be a contest between challengers versus champions.

Remo D'Souza and Terence Lewis are the judges of the show who would select contestants for the top list. The hosts are Raghav Juyal and Ridhima Pandit.

Punit Pathak is the choreographer.

== Contestants ==
Sr.	Champions
1	Teriya Magar
2	Faisal & Vaishnavi
3	MJ 5
4	Bir Radha Sherpa
5	V Company

Sr.	Challengers
1	Aryan Patra
2	Bad Salsa
3	Kings United
6	Piyush Bhagat
4	Wild Ripperz
5	Sushant Khatri
7	Yogesh sharma & Dipali borkar
8	Nandani Vaishnav

== Finale results ==
Sr.	Contestant	Status
1	Bir Radha Sherpa	Winner
2	Piyush Bhagat	1st Runner-up
3	MJ 5	2nd Runner-Up
4	Sushant Khatri	3rd Runner-up
5	Faisal & Vaishnavi	4th Runner-up

== New entries ==
MS.Briti sharma	Contestant	solo	New entry
1	13.13	Challenger	7 October
2	Kings United	Challenger	14 October
3	Aryan Patra	Challenger	21 October
4	Proneeta Swargiary	Champion	21 October
5	Piyush & Preeti	Challenger	28 October
6	Hip Circle	Challenger	4 November

== Eliminated dancers ==
- Teriya Magar (champion)
- 13.13 Crew (Challenger)
- V Company (champions)
- Proneeta Swargiary (champion)
- Piyush & Preeti (Challengers)
- Hip Circle (Challengers)

== Scores chart ==
=== Weekly scores chart ===
Contestants	1st week	2nd week	3rd week	4th week	5th week	6th week	7th week
Total Score = 110
Bir Radha Sherpa	100	99	99	100	110	97	Winner
Piyush Bhagat	100	100	100	108	109	100	1st Runner-up
MJ 5	98	100	100	97	106	100	2nd Runner-up
Sushant Khatri	96	98	100	98	100	100	3rd Runner-up
Faisal & Vaishnavi	94	99	100	110	96	98	4th Runner-up
Wild Ripperz	99	100	100	100	98	96	Eliminated
Kings United	99	99	100	107	98	Eliminated	
Bad Salsa	95	98	100	Eliminated			
Aryan Patra	94	98	100	Quit			
Yogesh & Dipali	95	98	Eliminated				

== See also ==
- List of dance style categories
- Dance Plus
- India's Best Dancer
- Super Dancer
