= Kartikey Malviya =

Indian actor

kartikey Malviya
- Born: Itarsi, Madhya Pradesh, India
- Other name: Kanha
- Occupation: Actor
- Years active: 2013-present
- Height: 5 ft 9 in (1.75 m)
- Parents: Mahesh Malviya (father); Neelima Malviya (mother)
- Relatives: Nupur Malviya

Kartikey Malviya is an Indian child actor. He is well known for his role as Young Shani in the popular mythological soap Karmaphal Daata Shani that aired on Colors TV. Malviya has played the titular role of the young Chandragupta Maurya. and Samba (Son of Lord Krishna) in the series RadhaKrishn.

== Career ==
Malviya made his television debut on the show India's Best Dramebaaz. He appeared in several episodes and was the season 2 runner-up. For his performance, Malviya earned the nickname of "Mytho King" from judge Sajid Khan. On the show, Malviya portrayed mythological characters including Karna, Jatayu, and Bhagat Singh. The performances established Malviya as a well-known actor.

In April 2018, Malviya promoted India's Best Dramebaaz, when he encouraged talented children of Bhopal to audition for the show's third season.

In April 2016, Malviya began playing young Shani Dev in Indian television show Karmphaldata Shani. Initially, Malviya was signed for 20 episodes, but due to the actor's high popularity, Malviya was able to renew his contract in October 2017.

Malviya reportedly bonds well with his co-stars including his onscreen mother Juhi Parmar. Malviya has publicly proclaimed that fellow actor Tarun Khanna, is his 'Dronacharya'. Malviya has visited Lucknow, Ahmedabad, and Indore for the promotion of the show. Malviya has also promoted the show by making appearances on television show Bigg Boss 10 in character.

The show has been dubbed in many Indian languages like Bengali, Tamil, Telugu, and Malayalam. In Malayalam, it is dubbed in the name of Shaneeshwaran on Surya TV. In in Colors Tamil. As a result, Malviya's popularity has grown in the whole of India especially in Kerala, Nepal, Myanmar, Indonesia, and Bangladesh. Malviya had been called to attend the Meet and Greet show in Indonesia.

Malviya portrayed the role of young Chandragupta Maurya in the historical drama series Chandragupta Maurya on Sony TV. In 2020, he portrayed the negative role of Samba, son of Lord Krishna and his wife Queen Jambavati in Star Bharat's popular show Radha Krishna.

== Personal life ==
Malviya was born in Itarsi, India, to father Mahesh Malviya and mother Neelima Malviya. Malviya became the first runner up in India's Best Dramebaaz. His father is an ordinance factory employee in Itarsi. Kartikey also has an older sister named Nupur Malviya who made a television appearance on Zee TV's Sa Re Ga Ma Pa. For her performance, Nupur won a number of awards. For now, she is pursuing MBBS in Indore vicinity.

Malviya learned acting from his mother, who is knowledgeable in the field of Bharatnatyam. After Malviya's performance on the television show India's Best Dramebaaz, He received an acting tutor on set, which was provided by the production house. Malviya has been reportedly using online studying tools in between his shooting schedule so that he could continue with his education. He successfully passed the 10th CBSE board exam in March 2019. He has chosen to pursue the humanities stream there after.

In October 2017, Malviya had minor vocal cord surgery.

== Television ==
Year	Project	Role	Channel
2011	Sa Re Ga Ma Pa L'il Champs Season 4	Contestant Singer	Zee TV
2013	India's Best Dramebaaz Season 1	Contestant Actor	Zee TV
2015–2016	India's Best Dramebaaz Season 2	Contestant/First Runner-up	Zee TV
2016	Bigg Boss 10	Shani Dev	Colors TV
2016–2018	Karmaphal Daata Shani	Shani	Colors TV
2018–2019	Chandragupta Maurya	Chandragupta Maurya	Sony Entertainment Television
2020–2023	RadhaKrishn	Samba	Star Bharat
2024, 2025	Shiv Shakti – Tap Tyaag Tandav	Shani	Colors TV

== Awards and honours ==
=== Awards ===
Malviya won several awards for his lead performance in Karmphaldata Shani. This includes an award by ABP News for completion of 13 successful years on its popular TV news show Saas Bahu Aur Saazish Telebrations.

Year	Award	Category	Show	Result
2017	Zee Gold Awards	Best Child Actor	Karmphaldata Shani	Won
2017	Zee Gold Awards	Gold Debut in a lead role	Karmphaldata Shani	Nominated
2017	Indian Television Academy Awards	Best Child Actor	Karmphaldata Shani	Won
2017	Nickelodeon Kids' Choice Awards India 2017	Best Child Entertainer on TV	Karmphaldata Shani	Nominated

=== Honours ===
In March 2018, Malviya was invited to Punjab to celebrate the holiday Shri Ram Navami, as a chief guest at Siddh Shaktipeeth Shri Devi Talab Mandir, Jalandhar.

In April 2018, Malviya visited Bhopal to promote India's Best Dramebaaz. Malviya has also attend social events, including Help A Star with actors Gautam Rode and Shreyas Talpade.
