= Mudassar Khan =

Indian choreographer (born 1987)

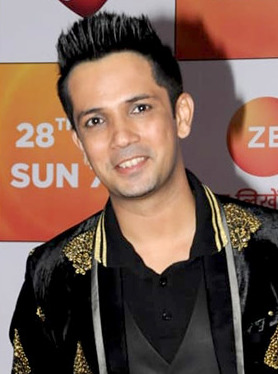
- Khan at the Zee Rishtey Awards 2018
- Born: 20 October 1987 (age 38); Mumbai, Maharashtra, India
- Occupations: Choreographer; dancer
- Years active: 2010 – Present
- Spouse: Riya Kishanchandani (m. 2023)

Mudassar Khan (born 20 October 1987) is an Indian dancer and film choreographer. He was a dance teacher in Thakur Public School Kandivali from 2001 to 2006. He is a judge in the dance reality television series Dance India Dance (season 4, season 5 & season 6).

== Television ==
- Dance India Dance (season 4, season 5 & season 6) as a mentor and judge.
- Dance India Dance Li'L champs season 3 as a judge

=== Choreographer ===
Mudassar Khan has done choreography for films such as

Movie / Album	Song	Year / Date
Dabangg	Humka Peeni Hai	2010
Bodyguard	Desi Beat	2011
Ready	Dhinka Chika & Character Dheela Hai	2011
Dabangg 2	Pandey Ji Seeti	2012
Boss	"Party All Night"	2013
Fugly	Fugly	2014
Prem Ratan Dhan Payo	Prem Leela	2015
Mastizaade	Mera Rom Rom Romantic	2016
Mitron	Kamariya	2018
Choodiyan-Single	Choodiyan	2019
Ek Ladki Ko Dekha Toh Aisa Laga	Gud Naal Ishq Mitha	2019
Radhe	Radhe title track	2021
ANTIM: The Final Truth	Bhai Ka Birthday	2021

== Personal life ==
He married long time girlfriend Riya Kishanchandani on 30 November 2023. Choreographer Mudassar Khan and his wife, Riya Kishanchandani, have welcomed a baby girl in December 2024.
