= Aligarh murder case =

2019 death of a 2-year-old Hindu girl in India

Murder of Twinkle Sharma
- Date: 2 June 2019
- Location: Tappal, Aligarh district, Uttar Pradesh, India; 28.042212°N 77.579136°E
- Deaths: One two-year-old girl
- Accused: Zahid Ali, Shabusta, Mehdi Hasan, Aslam

The Aligarh murder case involved the death of a two-year-old girl in the Aligarh district of Uttar Pradesh, India. She went missing on 30 May 2019, and her body was found three days later in a garbage dump. Police stated that the girl was abducted and killed in a form of revenge crime over a monetary dispute. The murder caused widespread outrage, which led to the spread of misinformation on social media as rumours were circulated.

Zahid Ali and Aslam were arrested on 4 June 2019 and confessed to the killing over an unpaid loan of 10,000 rupees. Zahid's wife, Shabusta and brother Mehdi Hasan were arrested on 8 June 2019 for assisting the crime.

== Murder ==
On 30 May in Aligarh, Uttar Pradesh, a 2 1/2-year-old girl went missing. The next day a police report was filed. On 2 June, the body of the child was found in a garbage dump. On 5 June, the police claimed that the girl was abducted and killed in a revenge crime over a monetary dispute involving her father.

The family said that the primary accused, Zahid Ali, had threatened them over a monetary dispute. Police investigations have revealed Zahid lured the girl and killed her with the help of Aslam in the latter's home. The body was then dumped in a dupatta belonging to his wife Shagufta.

Three days after the victim was abducted, her body was carried by stray dogs out of a dumping ground on 2 June 2019 in Aligarh, and were eating at her body when locals found her. Widespread condemnation and outrage sparked on social media via hashtags and tweets that included misinformation.

ADG (Law and Order) Anand Kumar told ANI, "It is a shocking incident for all of us. The UP Police has taken up this case in right earnest. We will leave no stone unturned in the matter. We hope that the entire case will be worked out very soon."

== Investigation ==
Although the police ruled out rape, vaginal swabs were sent for testing. SSP of police Akash Kulhari said cause of death were "ante-mortem" injuries and was confirmed by post-mortem due to choking. Questions have been raised over the police investigation. The family of the victim has claimed that she was raped.

On 7 June, the police gave the investigation to a six-member Special Investigation Team (SIT) to enquire into death of the child. ADG (Law and Order) Anand Kumar said, "A SIT has been formed under the Superintendent of Police, Rural Area (SPRA). A forensic science team, the Special Operations Group (SOG) and a team of experts have been included in the SIT to conduct the investigation on a fast-track basis. The POCSO Act will also be there in the case..."

The Aligarh police stated that POCSO had been applied though the post-mortem didn't find evidence of rape. It denied reports of the eyes of the victim being gouged out and invoked the National Security Act against the accused due to the seriousness of the crime.

The investigation of the forensic science laboratory of Agra did not come to any conclusion on sexual assault, so the police applied for permission to consult another forensic science laboratory in Lucknow and the Central Forensic Science Laboratory in Chandigarh. The report stated that the rotting of the skin gave the perception that her eyes were gouged out and her arm had been detached from the body due to being eaten at by insects. She had also suffered a fracture in her left leg and her rib bones had pierced the chest.

== Arrest of suspects ==
Zahid Ali and Aslam were arrested on 4 June and confessed to killing the victim over the unpaid loan of 10,000 rupees. Zahid's wife Shagufta and his brother Mehdi Hasan were arrested on 8 June for "criminal conspiracy" and "causing disappearance of evidence of offence".
