= A Flying Jatt =

2016 Indian film by Remo D'Souza

- Theatrical release poster
- Directed by: Remo D'Souza
- Written by: Remo D'Souza; Tushar Hiranandani; Aakash Kaushik; Madhur Sharma
- Story by: Remo D'Souza
- Produced by: Ekta Kapoor Shobha Kapoor
- Starring: Tiger Shroff; Jacqueline Fernandez; Nathan Jones
- Cinematography: Vijay Kumar Arora
- Edited by: Nitin FCP
- Music by: Sachin–Jigar
- Production company: Balaji Motion Pictures
- Distributed by: ALT Entertainment
- Release date: August 25, 2016 (India)
- Running time: 151 minutes
- Country: India
- Language: Hindi
- Box office: ₹56.13 crore

A Flying Jatt is a 2016 Indian superhero comedy film co-written and directed by Remo D'Souza and produced under the banner of Balaji Motion Pictures. It features Tiger Shroff, Jacqueline Fernandez and Nathan Jones in the lead roles. A Flying Jatt narrates the story of Aman Dhillon, a martial arts instructor (Shroff) who gains superpowers from a divine tree.

The film was released worldwide on 25 August 2016 on the Janmashtami weekend. The film received mixed-to-negative reviews.

== Plot ==
Wealthy and influential builder Mr. Rakesh Malhotra has built a factory on the shore of a lake into which pollutants and toxic waste are released. He wants to build a bridge across it for faster transportation. Still, he cannot do so due to a sacred tree present on the other side of the lake on a piece of land that belongs to Mrs. Dhillon, a religious but irrepressible Punjabi woman living with her son Aman Dhillon and his brother, Rohit Dhillon. Aman is a martial arts teacher in a school and has a crush on Kirti, a fellow teacher. After Malhotra fails to intimidate the Dhillon family into selling their land, he brings in Raka, a mercenary, to get the job done. Raka arrives at the tree with a chainsaw, but Aman is present there and tries to stop him. Raka beats Aman badly but moments, before he tries to decapitate him with the chainsaw, a lightning bolt hits the tree. The impact flings Raka away, and he lands amongst barrels of toxic waste outside Malhotra's factory.

The next morning, Aman finds himself in his bed alive with no sign of any injury and presumes all that happened to be a dream. He also notices a khanda that has appeared on his back, the same symbol which was carved on the tree and had been imprinted on him during the attack. Later that day, he and his brother notice a few unusual things happening to him, such as increased agility and the ability to absorb information by touching objects. After escaping an ambush using super speed, Rohit and his mother confirm that Aman has somehow gained superpowers. She immediately declares him a superhero. After making him a costume and showing him several superhero films for inspiration, Aman's mother tells him the story of his father, Sardar Kartar Singh Dhillon, a Sikh who went to Shaolin to learn martial arts and was named "Flying Jatt". She asks Aman to take up the legacy of his father and keep Flying Jatt as his superhero name to which he agrees. Although his superhero exploits get off to a rocky start, Flying Jatt is soon recognized when he saves hostages from a terrorist attack at an airport. As he gains even more success being a hero, Aman proposes to Kirti and reveals his secret identity to her.

Raka is found alive but is now stronger and more dangerous than before after being exposed to the pollutants at the factory, which further exposure continues to make him even more powerful. Aman goes on to battle him several times, beating Raka each time before finally becoming gravely injured in a brutal fight. To save him from further pain, his brother Rohit goes in his place as Flying Jatt and gets brutally beaten by Raka and dies. Aman and his mother are distraught with grief. The earth begins to slowly turn into a toxic wasteland and people begin to die due to the growing amount of pollution. An enraged Aman by his brother's death, Aman becomes and Sikh Sardar and decides to face Raka. Raka initially overpowers and knocks out Aman. But Aman quickly regains his consciousness, overpowers Raka and takes him above the earth, into space. With no pollution to strengthen Raka, Aman easily defeats him, killing Raka by inserting his Kara into his chest. Aman returns to earth and is met by a rejoicing crowd.

== Cast ==
- Tiger Shroff as Aman Dhillon / Flying Jatt
- Jacqueline Fernandez as Kirti
- Nathan Jones as Raka
- Kay Kay Menon as Mr. Rakesh Malhotra
- Amrita Singh as Mrs. Dhillon
- Gaurav Pandey as Rohit Dhillon
- Sushant Pujari as Goldy
- Shraddha Kapoor as Herself (cameo appearance)

== Reception ==
A Flying Jatt received mixed-to-negative reviews, who appreciated cast performance, visual effects, music direction and action sequences, but criticised for script, narration, pace, inconsistent tone, clichès and direction. On review aggregator website Rotten Tomatoes, A Flying Jatt has an approval rating of 43% on the basis of 7 reviews with an average rating of 4.8 out of 10.

Srijana Mitra Das from The Times of India gave the film 3.5 out of 5 stars and stated, "Tiger does a neat job as Aman, shivering superhero who fights crime but also buys 'do kilo lauki' on the way home".

Firstpost said, "The film's comedy, occasional inventiveness and aura of innocence are what make it effective in its own way, despite the lack of depth. D'souza had displayed his natural wit even in his first film F.A.L.T.U. in 2011. A Flying Jatt could have been so much better than what it is, if he had not kept one eye fixed Westward for inspiration. This one is perhaps best suited to the very very young."

Sarita Tanwar from Daily News and Analysis gave the film 2 out of 5 stars and said, "You'll need superhero levels of patience to watch this".

Anupama Chopra from the Hindustan Times gave the film 1.5 stars out of 5, and said "The first half of A Flying Jatt has moments of fun – I loved that despite being a superhero he has a fear of heights, so he flies very close to the ground. But post-interval, laughter takes a back seat."

HuffPost critic Suprateek Chatterjee asked the question, "Why does this even exist?" and stated, "Remo D'Souza's superhero flick is a symbol of Bollywood's laziness and creative bankruptcy".

== Soundtrack ==
A Flying Jatt

Soundtrack album by Sachin–Jigar
- Released: 2016
- Genre: Feature film soundtrack
- Length: 26:42
- Language: Hindi
- Label: Zee Music Company

Sachin–Jigar chronology
Hero (2015)	A Flying Jatt (2016)	Wrong Side Raju (2016)
External audio
- Audio Jukebox on YouTube

All music is composed by Sachin–Jigar.

Track listing
No.	Title	Lyrics	Singer(s)	Length
1.	"A Flying Jatt"	Vayu & Raftaar	Mansheel Gujral, Raftaar, Tanishkaa	4:36
2.	"Toota Jo Kabhi Tara"	Priya Saraiya	Atif Aslam, Sumedha Karmahe	5:05
3.	"Beat Pe Booty"	Vayu	Sachin Sanghvi, Jigar Saraiya, Kanika Kapoor, Vayu	3:17
4.	"Bhangda Pa"	Mayur Puri	Vishal Dadlani, Divya Kumar, Asees Kaur	3:58
5.	"Khair Mangda"	Priya Saraiya	Atif Aslam, Divya Kumar	4:17
6.	"Raj Karega Khalsa"	Priya Saraiya	Daler Mehndi, Navraj Hans	5:28
Total length:				26:42

== Graphic novel and game ==
A Flying Jatt has been made into a graphic novel by Thought Bubbles Studio Planet. The story continues where the film ends.

A mobile video game based on the film was released as a tie-in during its release as well, it was developed by Hungama Gameshastra Pvt. Ltd. (a joint venture of Hungama and Gameshastra).

== Awards and nominations ==
Award	Category	Recipients and nominees	Result	Ref.
9th Mirchi Music Awards	Best Song Engineer (Recording & Mixing)	Eric Pillai – "Beat Pe Booty"	Nominated	
Big Zee Entertainment Awards 2017	Most Entertaining Dancer	Tiger Shroff	Won	
