= Ganesh Hegde =

Indian singer, performer, video director and choreographer

- Born: 10 November 1973 (age 52); Bombay, Maharashtra, India
- Occupations: Singer, choreographer
- Spouse: Sunayna Hegde (m. 2011)

Ganesh Hegde is an Indian singer and choreographer. Hegde is known for his work in the Oscar-nominated film Lagaan and for his musical numbers in Company. Ganesh has choreographed several stage shows, including "Temptations" (2004), the Bollywood rock concert which toured America with stars such as Shah Rukh Khan, Rani Mukherjee, Preity Zinta, Saif Ali Khan and Arjun Rampal and the opening sequence of Michael Jackson's India concert as part of the HIStory World Tour, which was held in Mumbai in 1996.

His notable works include the song "Babuji Zara Dheere Chalo" from Dum, "Main Hoon Don" from Don – The Chase Begins Again, "Chammak Challo" from Ra.One and most recently, "Dhishoom Dhishoom" from The Archies.

== Early life ==
Ganesh Hegde is a Tuluva Bunt, born on 10 November 1973 in Bombay (present-day Mumbai) to Tulu-speaking father, Harishchandra Subbaiah Hegde and Parsi mom, Vidya Hegde. Hegde is an alumnus of the Umedbhai Patel English School and Prahladrai Dalmia Lions College, Mumbai. "Alumnus PDLC College".

== Career ==
=== Choreography ===
He has been associated with the Zee Cine Awards since conception and has choreographed Filmfare Awards for several years.

Hegde has choreographed the "item number" and "item gal" concept in Bollywood songs like "Mehboob Mere" from Fiza starring Sushmita Sen, "Babuji Zara Dheere Chalo from Dum starring Yana Gupta, and "Khallas" from Company starring Isha Koppikar and also the music video type execution in movies with "Kambakht Ishq" from Pyaar Tune Kya Kiya and "Khallas" from Company.

He was selected as one of the celebrity guests that attended the Miss World Canada 2012 final round event at Vancouver on 13 May 2012.

=== Singing ===
In October 2005, Ganesh released his debut album G with the funding and promotion of actor Shah Rukh Khan. He is known as the first Indian pop star to produce, write, direct and star in his debut music video for his single "Main Deewana". Hegde was credited as the music director for the 2007 film Ram Gopal Varma Ki Aag.

Hegde started performing with Asha Bhosle on stage shows and she is reported to have convinced him to release his own album. She has sung a duet with him in G, titled "Kabhi Kabhi".

Hegde then launched his second pop album, Let's Party in August 2011, which features Hrithik Roshan and Katrina Kaif in the title song's music video, "Let's Party" and Bipasha Basu and Priyanka Chopra in the music video for "Mind Blowing". The album was launched by Shahrukh Khan, Hrithik Roshan, Bipasha Basu, Priyanka Chopra and Sonu Nigam. Deepika Padukone also featured in one of his songs titled "Bolydude Ganeshan".

Hegde also performed the rap promo song "Ek Sawaal Ka Sawaal Hai" for the third season of Kaun Banega Crorepati, hosted by Shah Rukh Khan. The song appears on a T-Series compilation album titled Shah Rukh Khan Kar Le Kar Le Koi Dhamaal. The music video was conceptualized and directed by Hegde.

== Personal life ==
Hegde married his long‑time girlfriend Sunayna Shetty in a private ceremony in Mumbai on 5 June 2011. Sunayna is a stylist by profession and is responsible for styling Ganesh for all his public appearances.

== Filmography ==
=== TV ===
- Jhalak Dikhhla Jaa – Season 9 Judge (2016)
- Jhalak Dikhhla Jaa – Season 8 Judge (2015)
- Boogie Woogie Kids Championship - Special Appearance (2014)
- Kabhi Kabhii Pyaar Kabhi Kabhii Yaar – Judge (2008)
- Roobaroo Indian Idol Season 3 – Special appearance (2007)
- Fame X – Judge (2006)
- Temptations 2004 – Interviewer

=== Choreographer ===
Ganesh has done choreography for the following films.

Year / Date	Movie / Album
2023	The Archies
2022	Vikram Vedha
2022	Thank God
2022	Phone Bhoot
2015	Dilwale
2015	Calendar Girls
2014	Sharafat Gayi Tel Lene
2014	Happy New Year
2014	Darr @ the Mall
2012	Ajab Gazabb Love
2011	Let's Party
2011	Ra.One
2007	Saawariya
2007	Ram Gopal Varma Ki Aag
2006	Don - The Chase Begins Again
2005	Black
2003	Koi Mil Gaya
2003	Khushi
2003	Dum
2002	Maine Dil Tujhko Diya
2002	Aap Mujhe Achche Lagne Lage
2002	Company
2001	Indian
2001	Lagaan
2001	Pyaar Tune Kya Kiya
2001	One 2 Ka 4
2001	Grahan
2000	Fiza
2000	Hera Pheri
1998	Bandhan
1998	Pyaar kiya To Darna Kya
1996	Agni Sakshi
1996	Khamoshi
