= Suman Shashi Kant =

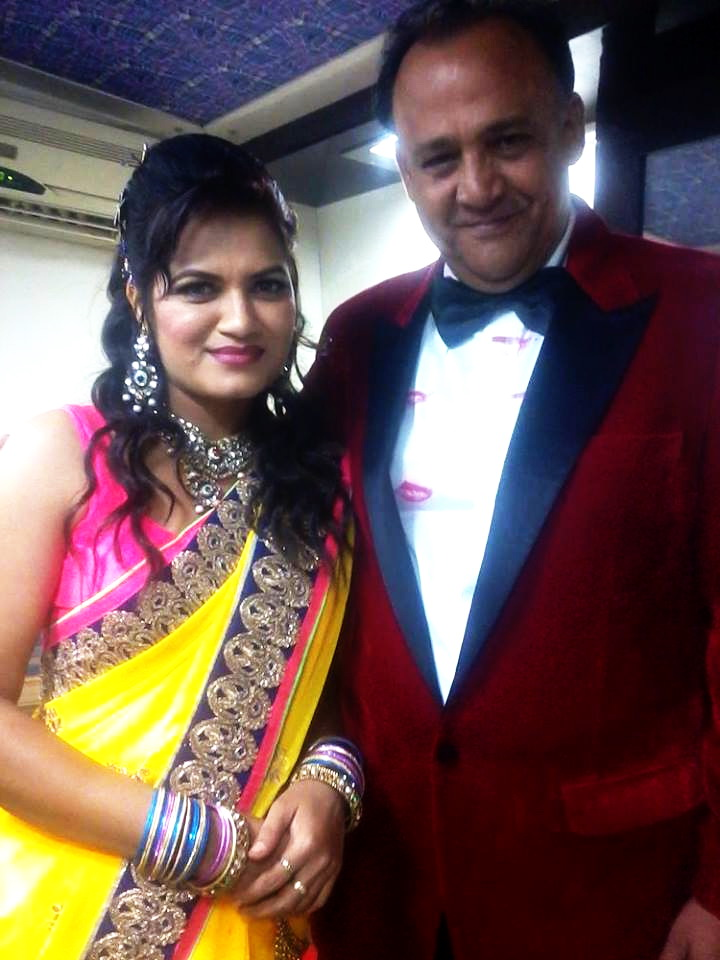
- Suman with Alok Nath at Zee Rishtey Awards.
- Born: Chhindwara, Madhya Pradesh, India
- Other name: Manda Tai; Badi Thakuraine
- Citizenship: Indian
- Occupations: Model, Actress, Dancer, Social Worker, Blogger
- Years active: 2009-present

Suman Shashi Kant (pronounced [aːʃaːnɛːɡɪ]; सुमन शशि काँत) is an Indian soap opera actress, model and dancer. Now She is doing Swastik Productions "Meri Saasu Maa " on Zee TV. She played the role of Badi Thakurain in Phir Subah Hogi (TV series) along with Varun Badola and also played a role of Manda Tai in Ek Mutthi Aasmaan (TV series) with Shilpa Shirodkar. She did her schooling from Madhya Pradesh. After completing college, she started working to fulfill her ambition to become an actor. Nowadays, she is associated with Kausalya Charitable Trust.

== Filmography ==
Suman appears in a movie

1. Tryst with destiny... A journey, A life produced by Miniboxoffice. 2. Hope In The Dark produced by Sourya Music

== Television ==
| Year | Show | Character | Channel | Production House | Notes | Co-Star |
|---|---|---|---|---|---|---|
| 2012 | Jamuniya | Rosy | Doordarshan | Doordarshan | | |
| 2012 | Balika Vadhu | Laali's Mother | Colors TV | Sphere Origins | Cameo | |
| 2012-13 | Phir Subah Hogi | Badi Thakurain | Zee TV | IMRC Entertainment & Panglosean Entertainment Pvt.Ltd. | Negative Lead | Rajiv Kumar, Varun Badola, Narayani Shastri, Gulki Joshi |
| 2013 | Rab Se Sohna Isshq | Dr. Nitya | Zee TV | Jay Production | Cameo | Ashish Sharma |
| 2013 | Pavitra Rishta | Kinshuk Banerjee | Zee TV | Balaji Telefilms | | Shakti Arora, Asha Negi |
| 2013-14 | Ek Mutthi Aasmaan | Manda Tai | Zee TV | DJ's a Creative Unit | Negative Lead | Shilpa Shirodkar, Mohit dagga, Aashish Chaudhary, Asha Negi |
| 2015 | Bandhan (Indian TV series) | Devi | Zee TV | Swastik Productions | Cameo | Sudesh Berry, Chhavi Pandey |
| 2015 | Gangaa | Monsieur Srivastav, Chief Minister | & TV | Sphere Origins | Cameo | Sushmita Mukherjee, Hiten Tejwani, Rakhee Tandon |
| 2016 | Meri Saasu Maa | Mausi Maa | Zee TV | Saba Mumtaz, Rahul Kumar Tewary | Negative | Hiba Nawab, Pearl V Puri |

== Stage performances ==
In 2013, Suman Shashi Kant performed at Zee Rishtey Awards, an award show for Zee TV actors. It aired on 1 December 2013 on Zee TV. In the same event, she also performed a dance number with Alok Nath on the song of Gandi Baat from the film R... Rajkumar.

== Sources ==
- 1. https://epaper.bhaskarhindi.com/c/2017982 Chhindwara 18 September 2013
- 2. https://www.india.com/showbiz/alok-naths-dirty-secret-revealed-4862/
- 3. http://epaper.patrika.com/c/3945789 Patrika Gwalior 28 November 2014.
- 4. https://www.bhaskar.com/news/MP-GWA-t-4822132-NOR.html Dainik Bhaskar 28 November 2014.
- 5. http://www.zeetv.com/shows/meri-saasu-maa/cast/suman-kanth-as-maasi-ma-shashikala-devi.html
- 6. https://epaper.bhaskarhindi.com/c/10508649 23 May 2016
- 7 https://www.nettv4u.com/celebrity/hindi/tv-actress/suman-shashi-kant
- 8. https://www.tellychakkar.com/celebs/tv/suman-shashi-kant
- 9. http://naiduniaepaper.jagran.com/Article_detail.aspx?id=1352&boxid=43743&ed_date=2017-2-27&ed_code=40&ed_page=13 Chhindwara 27 Feb 2017
