= Nyay Anyay =

- Theatrical release poster
- Directed by: Lawrence D'Souza
- Written by: Talat Rekhi (dialogues); Majrooh Sultanpuri (lyrics)
- Screenplay by: Abdul Rauf
- Story by: Abdul Rauf
- Produced by: Sudhakar Bokade
- Starring: Jeetendra; Jaya Prada; Sumeet Saigal; Shilpa Shirodkar
- Cinematography: Lawrence D'Souza
- Edited by: Prashant Khedekar; Vinod Nayak
- Music by: Anand–Milind
- Production company: Divya Films Combines
- Release date: 28 September 1990
- Country: India
- Language: Hindi

Nyay Anyay (transl. Justice and Injustice) is a 1990 Indian Hindi-language legal action film, produced by Sudhakar Bokade under the Divya Films Combines banner and directed by Lawrence D'Souza. Starring Jeetendra, Jaya Prada, Sumeet Saigal, Shilpa Shirodkar, and music composed by Anand–Milind. This was the first movie of Lawrence D'Souza and Sudhakar Bokade as director and producer. The duo later collaborated on the movies Saajan and Sapne Sajan Ke.

== Plot ==
Ravi Khanna has worked hard to become a judge in the Mumbai High Court. He is married to beautiful lawyer Rama. His brother Sumit is a college student excelling in sports and studies. Sumit is in love with Anju, the only daughter of Diwan Pratap Singh. The alliance is approved by the Khannas and the Diwan and marriage is on the cards.

One day Anju goes missing. After a lengthy search her battered and bruised body is discovered. Diwan and Sumit are devastated. Anju's death is followed by the brutal deaths of five more college students. Police Inspector Khan's investigation leads him to conclude that Sumit has committed these murders.

Sumit is arrested. The matter will be tried in the court where Ravi is the judge and the defense lawyer is Rama.

== Cast ==
- Jeetendra as Judge Ravi Khanna
- Jaya Prada as Advocate Rama Khanna
- Sumeet Saigal as Sumeet Khanna
- Shilpa Shirodkar as Anju Singh
- Anupam Kher as Diwan Pratap Singh (special appearance)
- Paresh Rawal as Malhotra (special appearance)
- Mangal Dhillon as Inspector Khan
- Shashi Kiran as Sadanand

== Soundtrack ==
Song	Singer
"Jiyo Ki Ek Saal"	Abhijeet, Kavita Krishnamurthy, Mangal Singh
"Aaj Teri Baaho Me" (Happy)	Anuradha Paudwal, Mangal Singh
"Aaj Teri Baaho Me" (Sad)	Mangal Singh
"Aashiq Nazar Ka"	Alka Yagnik, Sudesh Bhosle
"Raat Jaan E Jaan"	Anuradha Paudwal
