= Swarg Yahan Narak Yahan =

- DVD cover
- Directed by: Vimal Kumar
- Written by: Kader Khan (dialogues)
- Screenplay by: Gyandev Agnihotri
- Story by: Humayun Mirza
- Produced by: Rajeev Kumar
- Starring: Mithun Chakraborty; Shilpa Shirodkar; Sumalatha; Kader Khan
- Cinematography: Anil Dhanda
- Edited by: PRakash Dave
- Music by: Rajesh Roshan
- Production company: Saptarishi Films
- Release date: 2 August 1991
- Running time: 125 minutes
- Country: India
- Language: Hindi

Swarg Yahan Narak Yahan (transl. Heaven is here, hell is here) is a 1991 Indian Hindi-language film directed by Vimal Kumar, starring Mithun Chakraborty, Shilpa Shirodkar, Sumalatha, Gulshan Grover, Adi Irani and Kader Khan. Mithun Chakraborty played a dual role in the film of both father and son in opposing characters. The film depicts the dynamics of upbringing of children by parents and how few wrong practices of parents can misguide their children.

== Plot ==
Swarg Yahan Narak Yahan is the story of a dignified father and his conflict with his spoilt son. Sumalatha and Shilpa Shirodkar play the leading ladies for the father and the son, respectively. The film resembles Ramesh Sippy's Shakti.

The film starts by showing a hard working, principled police inspector, Vijay Kumar and his sad wife, Suman Kumar. They are childless couples and very sad. By their prayers, finally they get a son and they name him Suraj (indicating that he has brought new light in the lives of parents). Suraj is brought up in a typical middle-class family background whose father is an honest and respectable police officer. Vijay earns Rs 3000 per month and is very proud of himself because he is a dedicated government servant. He is not able to give a luxurious life to his son but believes that family love and bonding are more important. Everything seems going well when Suraj's classmates lure him into lavish lifestyle. Few of his classmates come from very rich and wealthy families. One of his best friends, who is son of Haveliram invites him to his birthday party. Haveliram is a smuggler and makes large money through illegal trades. He defends his son for all his mischief and never scolds him for any blunder he makes. Suraj breaks an expensive glass at the birthday party but Haveliram does not complain about anything, as he knows that money can bring new glass. Suraj comes late from the party for which his father scolds him but Suman defends her son by covering his mistakes.

One day, Vijay is called by the principal of his school and shows him Suraj's attendance which is 20% and similar in last few months. He shows him an application which is signed by Vijay but he is ignorant of this letter or application. He learns that his son is not attending school properly and goes out of school with his friends. Suraj is caught outside a film theater after watching an adult film. He is a minor, around 12–13 years old. He beats him after bringing him home by taking him to a closed room. Mother still covers his acts and requests father to not be strict. She brings him food. But the son is extremely angry but can't do anything. Jagatram, Suraj's maternal uncle, suggests the parents to send him to a boarding school to convert him into a good person.

The film jumps into the future and Suraj is now an adult Mithun. He is in love with Radha (Shilpa Shirodkar) and plans to continue his love story after going back to Mumbai. Returning home, he bows in front of his mother and hugs her. Father looks extremely excited that now his son must have become a good son and would respect him. Suraj bows and bends to touch his feet but gets up with a lighter in his hand and with an angry expression admits his intentions towards his father. He lights up the lighter and moves away, leaving behind a grieving father. Jagatram is surprised that his suggestion has failed. He blames the mother for covering his mistakes and making the son filled with revenge against his father.

The friendship between Suraj and Haveliram's son deepens and Haveliram promises to give him money for any of his business needs. Suraj does not want to live the life like his father who is now a police commissioner and is earning Rs 4000 per month. He is always happy with his salary. But Suraj wants to earn huge money with less effort and is attracted to Haveliram's lifestyle. Haveliram is a typical lala who is always carrying a small bag with thousands of money seen hanging through it. He is always ready to give his son as much money as he wants. Haveliram suggests Suraj to be less angry towards his father as his father is a police commissioner and would help him in future to make the way easier for his business. Cunningly, he is only trying to influence Suraj in order to help himself in his illegal trades. Suraj now turns into a good person, who agrees to work at Rs 4000 per month salary and marries Radha. Haveliram has a business of manufacturing helmets, but people are not buying them. He asks Suraj to convince his father to make a law which would require people to wear helmets. Suraj tells his father a lie that one of his good friends has died in a road accident because he was not wearing a helmet. He blames police and government for not showing concern towards strict helmet laws. He convinces the father to do the needful. And within a day Vijay makes it mandatory to wear helmets while driving a two wheeler. He appears in a press conference where journalists tell him that indirectly he has helped Haveliram who has sold all his helmets at triple rates in order to fulfill the immediate demand of the public due to stricter laws. He discovers that this was done by Suraj's manipulation because there has been no such accident which Suraj had mentioned. Vijay gets it confirmed and also learns that Suraj is hiding illegal drugs at his home which are given to him by Haveliram. His perception towards Suraj again changes and his expectations shattered as he was believing that Suraj is becoming a good citizen. On finding drugs at his home in the flush tank of toilet pot, he asks his subordinates to arrest Suraj.

Vijay now hunts for Haveliram to expose his smuggling business. He is gathering evidence against him and open his file for investigation. It is somehow stolen by Suraj by mimicking his father and he wants to destroy the file. But his father runs after him which brings them in a state of head-to-head fight. The fight turns bloody and Suraj is killed by his mother in the end because Suraj points the revolver against his father which the mother could not tolerate. Meanwhile, Radha gives birth to a son. Jagatram gives his final message to Suma that these consequences could have been prevented if Suman had not defended her child's mistakes and misbehaviors blindly and had differentiated between disciplining acts and childish behaviors.

== Cast ==
Cast	Role(s)	Note
Mithun Chakraborty	Commissioner of Police Vijay Kumar / Suraj Kumar	double role of father and son
Shilpa Shirodkar	Radha	Suraj's lover and later his wife
Sumalatha	Mrs.Vijay Kumar aka Suman	Vijay Kumar's wife and Suraj's mother
Kader Khan	Jagatram	Suman's brother and Suraj's maternal uncle
Gulshan Grover	Haveliram Rawalpindiwala	An smuggler
Vinod Chouhan		
Adi Irani	Bharat	Haveliram's son
Mangal Dhillon	Inspector Aslam Khan	special appearance

== Music ==
Track listing
No.	Title	Singer(s)	Length
1.	"Maine Tere Bahaane Bijli Ko Chhu Liya Hai"	Udit Narayan, Anuradha Paudwal
2.	"Yeh Suraj Chand Sitare"	Nitin Mukesh, Anuradha Paudwal
3.	"Phoolon Ka Yaaro Dekho Jigar"	Amit Kumar
4.	"Yeh Suraj Chand Sitare (Part 1)"	Nitin Mukesh
5.	"Khushiyaan Aayi Khushiyaan"	Anuradha Paudwal, Udit Narayan, Nitin Mukesh, Mangal Singh
6.	"Nayan Tere Kirno Ka Bhandar"	Anuradha Paudwal, Nitin Mukesh, Sukhwinder Singh
7.	"Yeh Suraj Chand Sitare (Part 2)"	Nitin Mukesh
