= Half Marriage =

Half Marriage may refer to:

- Half Marriage (film), a 1929 American melodramatic pre-Code film
- Half Marriage (TV series), an Indian drama series
