= Gracy Goswami =

Indian television actress (born 2003)

- Born: 22 May 2003 (age 23); Vadodara, Gujarat, India
- Occupation: Actress
- Years active: 2014–Present
- Known for: Balika Vadhu; Kyun Utthe Dil Chhod Aaye

Gracy Goswami is an Indian actress who mainly works in Hindi television and films. She made her acting debut in 2014 portraying Pinky Patil in Bandhan. Goswami is best known for her portrayal of Nandini Shekhar in Balika Vadhu and Amrit Sahani in Kyun Utthe Dil Chhod Aaye. Goswami made her film debut with Begum Jaan in 2017 and portrayed Young Khanzada Begum in the 2021 web series The Empire.

== Early life ==
Goswami was born on 22 May 2003 in Vadodara, Gujarat.

== Career ==
At the age of 11 in 2014, Goswami landed her first television series Bandhan on Sony Entertainment Television as Pinky Patil but was replaced by Priyanka Purohit in January 2015. Additionally, she was next selected to play the character of young Nandini Shekhar in Colors TV's one of longest-running series Balika Vadhu and quit in April 2016 to participate in the same channel's dance reality show Jhalak Dikhhla Jaa 8. In 2017, she made her film debut with Srijit Mukherji's periodic film Begum Jaan in which she played Laadli. That same year, she appeared in an episode of crime drama Crime Patrol as Shilpi Rane. Next, Goswami portrayed Princess Garima in Star Bharat's Mayavi Maling. In 2020, she appeared in Anubhav Sinha's social drama Thappad playing Sania.

== Filmography ==
=== Television ===
Year	Title	Role	Notes	Ref.
2013	India's Best Dramebaaz	Contestant	8th place	
2014–15	Bandhan	Pinky Patil		
2015–16	Balika Vadhu	Nandini "Nimboli" Shekhar		
2016	Jhalak Dikhhla Jaa 9	Contestant	11th place	
2016–2017	Baal Krishna	Radha		
2018	Mayavi Maling	Princess Garima		
2021	Kyun Utthe Dil Chhod Aaye	Amrit "Amru" Sahani		

==== Special appearances ====
Year	Title	Role	Ref.
2016	Udaan	Nandini Shekhar	
2016	Comedy Nights Bachao	Herself	
2017	Crime Patrol	Shilpi Rane	

=== Films ===
Year	Title	Role	Notes	Ref.
2017	Begum Jaan	Laadli		
2019	Commando 3	School student		
2020	Thappad	Sania Fonseca		
2021	The Tenant	Aparna		
2021	Chhorii	Small girl		
2023	Music School	Samyuktha Reddy	Telugu-Hindi bilingual film	
2025	De De Pyaar De 2	Tia		

=== Web series ===
Year	Title	Role	Ref.
2020	Bhalla Calling Bhalla	Arundhati Bhalla/Lisa	
2021	The Empire	Young Khanzada Begum	
