= Abhay Vakil (actor) =

Indian actor

- Born: Mumbai, Maharashtra, India
- Occupation: Actor
- Years active: 2005–present

Abhay Vakil is an Indian actor known for his work in Hindi-language television series. He is best known for his roles in Silsila Pyaar Ka, Zaara, Paalkhi, Teen Bahuraaniyaan, Kaarthika, and Kahaani Ghar Ghar Kii. He has appeared in family dramas, teen shows, and anthology series.

== Career ==
Abhay began his television career with a cameo in Kehta Hai Dil (2005) on Star Plus. He played Parth Agarwal in Kahaani Ghar Ghar Kii (2003–2005) and starred as the lead in Kkehna Hai Kuchh Mujhko (2004). He portrayed a double role as Pranjal and Daksh in Paalkhi (2005–2006) and played Aakash Rathod in Tujko Hai Salaam Zindgi (2007–2008). He also appeared as Mahesh Gheewala in Teen Bahuraaniyaan (2007–2009) and as Abhishek in Kaarthika (2008–2009). Vakil played Samar in Zaara (Sahara One, 2006–2008), one of his notable series. He appeared in an episodic role as Onir in Teri Meri Love Stories (2012) and later portrayed Raunak Tiwari in Silsila Pyaar Ka (2016).

== Filmography ==
=== Television ===
Year(s)	Title	Role	Notes
2005	Kehta Hai Dil	Cameo appearance	Television debut
2003–2005	Kahaani Ghar Ghar Kii	Parth Agarwal	
2004	Kkehna Hai Kuchh Mujhko	Lead role	
2005–2006	Paalkhi	Pranjal / Daksh	Dual role
2006–2008	Zaara	Samar	
2007–2008	Tujko Hai Salaam Zindgi	Aakash Rathod	
2007–2009	Teen Bahuraaniyaan	Mahesh Gheewala	
2008–2009	Kaarthika	Abhishek	
2012	Teri Meri Love Stories	Onir	
2016	Silsila Pyaar Ka	Raunak Tiwari	
