= Meri Saasu Maa =

Indian television series

- Genre: Drama, romance
- Created by: Saba Mumtaz
- Written by: Saba Mumtaz; Amit Senchoudhary; Anjum Abbas Jaya Misra; Sahar Quaze Dialogues- Shailesh Singh
- Directed by: Prabhat Prabhakar
- Creative director: Prabhjyot Gujral
- Starring: Hiba Nawab; Pearl V Puri; Anindita Saha Kapileshwari; Siddharth Arora
- Country of origin: India
- Original language: Hindi
- No. of seasons: 1
- No. of episodes: 187

Production
- Producers: Saba Mumtaz; Rahul Kumar Tewary
- Production locations: Lucknow and Mumbai
- Camera setup: Multi-camera
- Running time: Approx. 22 minutes
- Production company: Swastik Pictures

Original release
- Network: Zee TV
- Release: 26 January – 5 September 2016

Meri Saasu Maa (English: My Mother-In-Law) is a 2016 family television drama that aired on Indian television channel Zee TV. Hiba Nawab played a lead role in the series. It replaced Qubool Hai in its timeslot. It was then replaced by Sanyukt.

The series follows lead character Pari Sinha, who grew up without motherly love and seeks to establish a loving relationship with in her mother-in-law. As a newlywed, Pari finds it difficult to adjust to living with her in-laws.

== Plot ==
The story opens at the Shinha household with preparations for Pari's wedding. Her miserly aunt, who raised her without affection, refuses to spend money on it and Pari is doing much of the work, including restarting the house's generator. The baraat (groom's wedding procession) arrives, and Pari is reprimanded by her aunt for not being ready. As Pari goes to dress, she spies upon the baraat and sees the groom's mother – and imagines receiving the motherly love she always wanted. However, Pari overhears the groom and his mother talking to his lover in the rickshaw, saying that the marriage is a sham. The aunt rushes a horrified Pari to the ceremony, where Pari confronts them with what she witnessed; they deny it and leave, feigning insult, and Pari is blamed.

The next day at the Sharma household, celebrity and family matriarch Bhawna Devi chases down her granddaughter Suman for wearing Western clothes and riding on a motorcycle with a boy. She reprimands the women of the house for the way Suman was raised, which taints her reputation, and threatens Suman and her mother – who thinks Devi can only be calmed by her favourite son Sattu. Sattu is then shown devotedly praying in a temple, asking blessings for his mother. As he descends the temple stairs, he bumps into Pari. The diyas (oil lamps) set fire to her dupatta (scarf) and then all the hangings around them. Sattu jumps into the fire surrounding a frightened Pari.

=== Arc two ===
Sattu dies in a car accident. The plot makes a six-year leap and sees Pari and Maasaab in a house with Bunty Singh Chauhan, whom she later marries, and Bhavna living happily.

== Cast ==
=== Main ===
- Hiba Nawab as Pari Sharma /Singh (Nee' Sinha)– Emotionally neglected as a child, she later marries Sattu.
- Anindita Saha Kapileshwari as (Maa Saab) Bhawna Devi/ Rachna Devi – Sattu's mother, Pari's mother-in-law (Hindi: Saasu Maa)
- Pearl V Puri as Satyendra "Sattu" Sharma – He marries Pari and later dies
- Siddharth Arora as Bunty Singh Chauhan
- Nimai Bali as Digvijay Singh Chauhan
- Mazel Vyas as Arpita Chauhan – Bunty's younger sister
- Suman Shashi Kant as Sashikala Sinha – Pari's miserly aunt (Hindi: maasi), who considers Pari to be a burden and raised her without affection
- Meenakshi Arya
- Prithvi Shankala as Pari's father
- Krishna Soni as Kamlesh Sharma
- Dhiraj Totlani as Ankit Sinha – Pari's brother
- Arpita Amar as Meera Sinha – Pari's sister
- Rashul Tandon as Sarvesh Sharma
- Nirmala J Chandra as Aarti Sarvesh Sharma
- Kushabh Manghani as Akhilesh Sharma
- Tanvi Dogra as Babita Akhilesh Sharma
- Haider Karim as Mastana
- Aanchal Khurana as Roopmati
- Nina Sharma / Kiran Bhargava as Daddo (the eldest woman in the house) (dead)
- Tisha Kapoor as Shona

=== Notable guest appearances ===
- Rakhi Sawant
- Shamita Shetty appears in a one-hour episode with Kaala Teeka
