= Saba Mumtaz =

Indian television writer and producer

Saba Mumtaz is a noted Indian television writer and producer. She is the writer of successful shows like Yeh Rishta Kya Kehlata Hai, Bade Achche Lagte Hain Chand Chupa Badal Mein, Molkki, Saraswatichandra, Sapne Suhane Ladakpan Ke, Ek Boond Ishq, Yeh Moh Moh Ke Dhaagey, Dharti Ka Veer Yodha Prithviraj Chauhan, Shakuntala, Dharam Veer, Parrivaar – Kartavya Ki Pariksha, Navya..Naye Dhadkan Naye Sawaal, Haqeeqat, Meri Saasu Maa, Mariam Khan - Reporting Live Parivaar .. Udariyan and films Disha, Kori and The IMAAM

== Early life and background ==
She studied mass communication at AJK, Mass Communication Research Centre, Jamia Milia Islamia University in Delhi.

== Personal life ==
She is from Delhi, but resides in Mumbai with her daughter, Noveera. As of 2019, she is working on her new shows.

== Career ==
Saba got her first break in script writing with TV series, Haqeeqat on Sahara One in 2001, which was based on real-life incidents. This was followed by Dharti Ka Veer Yodha Prithviraj Chauhan (2006–2009), Dharam Veer (2008), Mohe Rang De (2009) and Mere Ghar Aayi Ek Nanhi Pari (2009) on Colors TV. She wrote for Yeh Rishta Kya Kehlata Hai (2009) and Chand Chupa Badal Mein (2010–2011) on Star Plus and Ek Boond Ishq on Life OK.

== Television ==
As Writer

- Haqeeqat (2001)
- Dharti Ka Veer Yodha Prithviraj Chauhan (2006–2009)
- Parrivaar – Kartavya Ki Pariksha (2007–2008)
- Dharam Veer (2008)
- Mohe Rang De (2009)
- Mere Ghar Aayi Ek Nanhi Pari (2009)
- Yeh Rishta Kya Kehlata Hai (2009–present)
- Shakuntala (2009)
- Chand Chupa Badal Mein (2010–2011)
- Dil Se Di Dua... Saubhagyavati Bhava? (2011–2013)
- Navya..Naye Dhadkan Naye Sawaal (2011–2012)
- Bade Achhe Lagte Hain (2011–2014)
- Sasural Simar Ka (2011– 2018)
- Sapne Suhane Ladakpan Ke (2012–2015)
- Ek Boond Ishq (2013–2014)
- Saraswatichandra (2013–2014)
- Hum Hain Na (2014–2015)
- Meri Saasu Maa (2016)
- Razia Sultan (2015)
- Yeh Moh Moh Ke Dhaagey (2017)
- Mariam Khan - Reporting Live (2018–2019)
- Molkki (2020–2022)

Feature Film - Disha [ FOR FILMS DIVISION ]

As Director

Feature Film - Disha [ FOR FILMS DIVISION ]

As Producer

Ek Boond Ishq (2013)

Yeh Moh Moh Ke Dhaagey (2017)

Meri Saasu Maa (2016)

Feature Film - Disha [ FOR FILMS DIVISION ]
