= Rajanadai =

- Poster
- Directed by: S. A. Chandrasekar
- Screenplay by: S. A. Chandrasekar
- Story by: Shoba Chandrasekhar
- Produced by: Shoba Chandrasekhar
- Starring: Vijayakanth; Gautami; Seetha; Vidhyashree
- Cinematography: Indhu Chakravarthy
- Edited by: D. Shyam Mukherjee
- Music by: M. S. Viswanathan
- Production company: V. V. Creations
- Release date: 28 October 1989
- Running time: 140 minutes
- Country: India
- Language: Tamil

Rajanadai (transl. Royal Walk) is a 1989 Indian Tamil-language action film directed by S. A. Chandrasekar. The film stars Vijayakanth, Gautami, Vidhyashree and Seetha. It was released on 28 October 1989. The film was later remade in Hindi by Chandrasekhar as Jeevan Ki Shatranj (1993) and in Bangladesh as Baba in (2003).

== Plot ==
Vijayakanth, an honest C.I.D. inspector, is married to Seetha and they have a daughter Shamili. Vijayakanth has enough evidence to arrest a dangerous criminal Tiger Kaali. Vijayakanth befriends Rekha, a C.I.D inspector, without knowing that she is Seetha's friend. Seetha compels Rekha to live with them. Seetha has blood cancer but she conceals this from her husband. When her husband and her friend know this news, they decide to go to the United States for treatment but Kaali manages to kill Seetha and erases the proofs. Vijayakanth is now more determined to catch him.

== Cast ==
- Vijayakanth as CID Inspector Vijayakanth
- Gautami as Rekha
- Vidhyashree as Thenmozhi
- Seetha as Seetha
- Suresh as Pandian
- Charan Raj as Tiger Kaali
- Radha Ravi as Chakravarthy
- Senthamarai as Police Commissioner
- Baby Shamili as Shamili
- S. S. Chandran
- Kovai Sarala
- Suryakanth
- Ennathe Kannaiah as Jail Superintendent
- Kuyili in a Special appearance

== Soundtrack ==
The music was composed by M. S. Viswanathan, with lyrics written by Vaali and Pulamaipithan.

Song	Singer(s)	Lyrics	Duration
"Kasthuri Maankutti" (sad)	K. S. Chithra	Pulamaipithan	4:37
"Kasthuri Maankutti" (duet)	P. Jayachandran, K. S. Chithra	Pulamaipithan	4:32
"Kasthuri Maankutti" (solo)	K. S. Chithra, Baby Varalakshmi	Pulamaipithan	1:27
"Onnum Rendum"	Vani Jairam	Vaali	4:46
"Thendralukku Thaai"	S. P. Balasubrahmanyam	Vaali	5:02
"Ulley Vanthathu"	Shoba Chandrasekhar, Mano	Vaali	5:19

== Release and reception ==
Rajanadai was released on 28 October 1989, alongside another Vijayakanth starrer Dharmam Vellum. P. S. S. of Kalki wrote that on one hand, there was a desire to express the sentiment of affection for wife, child and family, and on the other hand, there was a desire to take revenge on anti-social forces; director Chandrasekhar tried to bind the fans by separating the two, and the rope was not strong.
