= Silsila Pyaar Ka =

Indian drama television series

- Genre: Drama
- Story by: Mahesh Pandey; Dialogues; Sharad Chandra Tripathi
- Directed by: Ravi Raj
- Creative director: Bhawna Bundela
- Starring: Abhay Vakil; Chhavi Pandey; Shilpa Shirodkar
- Country of origin: India
- Original language: Hindi
- No. of episodes: 147

Production
- Producers: Rashmi Sharma; Pawan Kumar Marut
- Production locations: Bhopal; Mumbai
- Camera setup: Multi-camera
- Running time: 22 minutes
- Production company: Rashmi Sharma Telefilms Limited

Original release
- Network: Star Plus
- Release: 4 January – 5 June 2016

Silsila Pyaar Ka is an Indian television series that aired on Star Plus from 4 January to 5 June 2016. It was produced by Rashmi Sharma and Pawan Kumar Marut under Rashmi Sharma Telefilms and starred Abhay Vakil and Chhavi Pandey. It is the remake of the Star Jalsha show Tumi Asbe Bole.

== Plot ==
Raunak Tiwari, a college student falls for and writes love letter to Kajal Saxena. His overly possessive mother Janki forces Akshay Bansal, his friend to sign the letter with his own name. Enchanted, Kajal marries him. Raunak is heartbroken.

=== 5 years later ===
Akshay and Kajal have a daughter Sakshi, who has health problems since birth. Kajal learns how Janki forced Akshay; she tries to mend broken relationship between Raunak and Akshay. He dies in an accident. To fulfill his last wish, Kajal weds Raunak. She intends to find Akshay's killer, who turns out to be Raunak's uncle Pradeep.

Kajal finds out Randhir, Raunak's sick father who was being mistreated by Janki. He recovers. Kajal slowly falls for Raunak. Eventually, Janki realises her mistakes and the family is united.

== Cast ==
=== Main ===
- Abhay Vakil as Raunak Tiwari
- Chhavi Pandey as Kajal Saxena/Bansal/Tiwari
- Sehban Azim as Akshay Bansal

=== Recurring ===
- Shilpa Shirodkar as Janki Sanyal/Tiwari, Raunak's mother
- Vaquar Sheikh as Randhir Tiwari, Raunak's father
- Tvisha Solanki as Sakshi Bansal/Tiwari, Kajal and Akshay's daughter
- Sheezan Khan as Vinay Saxena, Kajal's brother and Neeti's husband
- Sheen Dass as Neeti Tiwari/Saxena, Raunak's sister and Vinay's wife
- Vishal Bharadwaj as Kartik Dave, Neeti's childhood friend and Sanjana's love interest
- Ravi Gossain as Harsh Chandra Sanyal, Raunak's maternal uncle
- Rakesh Kukreti as Pradeep Tiwari, Raunak's paternal uncle and Sanket and Sanjana's father
- Khyati Keswani as Vidhi Tiwari, Raunak's paternal aunt and Sanket and Sanjana's mother
- Abhishek Bajaj as Sanket Tiwari, Raunak's cousin
- Mrinal Singh as Sanjana Tiwari, Raunak's cousin
- Guddi Maruti as Sonali Tiwari, Raunak's paternal aunt
- Karishma Sharma as Munmun Mehra, Raunak's fiancé
- Sanjeev Jogtiyani as Sanjay
- Sumit Bhardwaj as Prateek
- Mohena Singh as Aarati

== Production ==
=== Development ===
Initially titled as Saajan, it was later renamed Silsila Pyaar Ka before its premiere.

After a month of launch, in February Sehban Azim's character was killed abruptly, making his sudden exit, for bringing a twist. However, soon in May, he was made to return when makers approached him.

In early March 2016, Shilpa Shirodkar while enacting a sequence while walking in staircase lost her balance and fell. With her unable to walk due to her injured back, her role was tweaked for her to take rest for few days. Later, in the same month, Abhay Vakil got injured when iron nails pierced his toes while running for a sequence. In April, the shoot was halted for a while when a rod fell on the head of the lead actress Chhavi Pandey who was hurt while shooting.
