= Dil Hi To Hai (1993 film) =

- Directed by: Asrani
- Produced by: Hanif-Samir
- Starring: Jackie Shroff; Shilpa Shirodkar; Divya Bharti
- Cinematography: V. Durga Prasad
- Edited by: Waman Bhosle; Gurudatt Shirali
- Music by: Laxmikant-Pyarelal
- Production company: Magnum Films International
- Release date: 1 January 1993
- Country: India
- Language: Hindi

Dil Hi To Hai (lit. 'It is only a heart') is a 1993 Indian Hindi-language romantic drama film directed by Asrani. It has Jackie Shroff in double role, along with Shilpa Shirodkar, Divya Bharti.

== Plot ==
King Vikram Singh rules over a tiny state in India, called Vikramgarh. His sons are the royal twin-brothers Harshvardhan and Govardhan. Harshvardhan is the smarter one of them, hence he is regarded to become the future King of Vikramgarh. The Diwan Thakur Karan Singh is his loyal friend who stays at the prince's side all the time to train him for his future duties. Govardhan can have all the liberty he wants, while Harshvardhan has to face his duties and hence cannot enjoy the same freedom. One day, when his marriage to Jayshree is planned, he decides to make his brother take his place, so Harshvardhan and his Diwan go to Mumbai where Harshvardhan meets Bharati and instantly falls in love and thus becomes the enemy of Jack who plans on getting Bharati for himself and her.

== Cast ==
- Jackie Shroff as double role
  - Prince Harshvardhan "Harsh/Raja" Singh: Vikram and Kaushalya's elder son; Govardhan's brother; Bharti's husband
  - Prince Govardhan Singh: Vikram and Kaushalya's younger son; Harshvardhan's brother; Jayashree's husband
- Shilpa Shirodkar as Jayshree Singh: Govardhan's wife; Vikram and Kaushalya's younger daughter-in-law
- Divya Bharti as Bharti Singh; Harshvardhan's wife; Vikram and Kaushalya's elder daughter-in-law
- Raza Murad as Bharti's Uncle
- Gulshan Grover as Jack Kamani
- Kader Khan as Diwan Karan Singh Thakur
- Amjad Khan as Maharaja Vikram Singh: Kaushalya's husband; Harshvardhan and Govardhan's father
- Anjana Mumtaz as Maharani Kaushalya Singh; Vikram's wife; Govardhan and Harshvardhan's mother
- Sulabha Deshpande as Mausi
- Kunickaa Sadanand as Flower Seller
- Sudhir Pandey as Kamani
- Anjan Srivastav as Minister
- Avtar Gill as Minister's Friend
- Ashok Saraf as Lodge's Manager
- Dinesh Hingoo as Raja's Neighbour
- Mulraj Rajda as Jayshree's Father
- Yunus Parvez as Goldsmith
- Vikas Anand as Hotel Manager
- Viju Khote as Taxi Driver

== Soundtrack ==
1. "Meri Choodiyan" - Lata Mangeshkar
2. "Dil Hi To Hai" (Sad) - Mohammed Aziz
3. "Dil Hi To Hai Aa Gaya" (Happy) - Mohammed Aziz, Alka Yagnik
4. "Ek Ladki Ka Main Deewana" - Mukul Agarwal, Sudesh Bhonsle
5. "Chhat Ke Upar Do Kabutar" - Sagarika Mukherjee, Sonali Bajpai, Manhar Udhas, Sudesh Bhonsle
6. "Sahiba O Sahiba" - Sudesh Bhosle, Amit Kumar, Alka Yagnik
7. "Chhat Ke Upar Do Kabutar" - Jackie Shroff, Manhar Udhas, Sudesh Bhonsle
