= Sanyukt =

Indian soap opera television series

- Also known as: Our Perfect Place
- Genre: Indian soap opera Family drama
- Created by: Atul Sharma
- Written by: Atul Sharma / Reshma Khan
- Directed by: Amarpreet Chhabra
- Creative director: Renu Rana
- Music by: Dhrubajyoti, Debojit Saha
- Country of origin: India
- Original language: Hindi
- No. of seasons: 01
- No. of episodes: 184

Production
- Producer: SA RE GA MA
- Production locations: Mumbai, India
- Camera setup: Multi-camera
- Production company: Saregama Productions

Original release
- Network: Zee TV
- Release: 6 September 2016 – 19 May 2017

Sanyukt (English: Our Perfect Place) is an Indian/Hindi family drama television series, which premiered on Zee TV from 6 September 2016 to 19 May 2017 and 28 March 2020, on Zee World. The series is aired every Monday - Sundays. The series is produced by Saregama Productions of Rahul Tewari. it replaces Meri Saasu Maa. It was replaced by Aisi Deewangi Dekhi Nahi Kahi after its completion.

== Plot ==
The story of the show is about an extended family and the trials and tribulations between each family member. The show revolves around the lives of the Mehta family clan, their relationships with each other, their joys, sorrows and eventually their love for each other. Govardhan Mehta is a simple and traditional man, lives with his family.

== Cast ==
- Shubhangi Latkar as Ila Mehta
- Kiran Kumar as Govardhan Mehta
- Maninder Singh as Rahul Mehta
- Suraj Kakkar as Sameer Mehta
- Harsh Vashisht as Parimal Mehta
- Mohit Sharma as Niranjan Mehta
- Simran Khanna as Tanuja Shah
- Priyanka Purohit as Hetal Shah
- Namrata Thapa as Gayatri Mehta
- Urvashi Sharma as Rita Mehta
- Sharad Joshi as Uday Mehta
- Mahima Nayak as Prachi
- Rishika Mihani as Maya
