= Sudhanthira Naattin Adimaigal =

- Poster
- Directed by: S. A. Chandrasekhar
- Screenplay by: S. A. Chandrasekhar
- Story by: Shoba
- Produced by: Gnaneswari J.; Shoba Chandrasekar; Thiruchitrambalam
- Starring: Radhika; Nizhalgal Ravi; Ravichandran
- Cinematography: Indhu Chakravarthy
- Edited by: D. Shyam Mukerji
- Music by: M. S. Viswanathan
- Production company: Kadhambari Creations
- Release date: 26 February 1988
- Country: India
- Language: Tamil

Sudhanthira Naattin Adimaigal (transl. Slaves of a free nation) is a 1988 Indian Tamil-language vigilante film directed by S. A. Chandrasekhar, who wrote the screenplay from a story by his wife Shoba.Dialogue was writtern by Valampuri John.The film stars Radhika, Nizhalgal Ravi and Ravichandran, with Charan Raj in a pivotal role. It was released on 26 February 1988. The film was remade in Hindi as Azaad Desh Ke Gulam (1990).

== Plot ==
The film is a classic vigilante-justice drama centered on systemic corruption, abuse of power, and the fight for true justice in a politically compromised society.

== Cast ==
- Radhika
- Nizhalgal Ravi
- Ravichandran
- Senthamarai
- S. S. Chandran
- Senthil
- Charuhasan
- C. I. D. Sakunthala
- Typist Gopu
- Charan Raj
- Srividya
- S. A. Chandrasekhar

== Soundtrack ==
The music was composed by M. S. Viswanathan.

Track listing
No.	Title	Lyrics	Singer(s)	Length
1.	"Ponno Maniyo"	Gangai Amaran	S. P. Balasubrahmanyam, K. S. Chithra	4:43
2.	"Naadu Kettu Ponadhaale"	Pulamaipithan	S. P. Balasubrahmanyam	4:42
3.	"En Annai Desame"	Pulamaipithan	K. S. Chithra	4:54
4.	"Ennai Padaicha Sami"	Pulamaipithan	Mano, Shoba Chandrasekhar	4:53
Total length:				19:12

== Release and reception ==
Sudhanthira Naattin Adimaigal was released on 26 February 1988. The film faced trouble with the censor board, resulting in a scene being censored. Jayamanmadhan of Kalki felt it would be a catalyst for corrupt politicians disappearing from Tamil cinema soon.
