= Jeevan Ki Shatranj =

- Directed by: S. A. Chandrasekhar
- Written by: Shoba Chandrasekhar
- Based on: Rajanadai (1989) by S. A. Chandrasekhar
- Produced by: Pawan Arora
- Starring: Mithun Chakraborty; Farah; Shilpa Shirodkar
- Music by: Anand–Milind
- Distributed by: Universal Enterprises
- Release date: 15 August 1993
- Running time: 140 minutes
- Country: India
- Language: Hindi

Jeevan Ki Shatranj is a 1993 Indian Hindi-language film directed by S. A. Chandrasekhar, starring Mithun Chakraborty, Farah, Shilpa Shirodkar. The film was a semihit at the box office. The film is a remake of director's own 1989 Tamil film Rajanadai.

== Plot ==
Vijay Sharma lives a wealthy lifestyle in Bombay along with his wife, Radha, son, Munna, and sister, Manju, who is dumb since birth; and works as a C.I.D. Police Inspector. When the Commissioner of Police is killed, he is assigned this investigation, and comes across evidence that may lead him to the killer. He submits this evidence to Assistant Commissioner of Police, Ashwini Kamble, and keeps two negatives with him. Then his wife's friend, Kiran, also a C.I.D. Inspector comes to live with them, leading to a series of comical misunderstandings, which turn tragic when Vijay finds out that Radha has cancer. He decides to travel to America to have her treated, but a bomb blast kills her. Devastated, he decides to bring in the killer, but before that a young man, Amar, approaches him for Manju's hand, and he gets them married. The evidence against the Commissioner's killer is tampered with, and Vijay is not able to locate the negatives. Shortly thereafter, Manju and Amar are killed, and Vijay is arrested for killing them. He is tried in Court, found guilty, and sentenced to life in prison - leaving his young son virtually alone to fend for himself.

== Cast ==
- Mithun Chakraborty as CID Inspector Vijay Sharma
- Farah as Radha Sharma
- Shilpa Shirodkar as CID Inspector Kiran
- Deepak Tijori as Amar
- Aruna Irani as Police Inspector Neeta
- Kader Khan as Police Constable No 100
- Kiran Kumar as Black Dogra
- Avtar Gill as ACP Ashwini Kamble
- Goga Kapoor as IGP Randhir Singh
- Tej Sapru as Babu
- Mahavir Shah as Press Photographer Tony
- Master Atit as Munna Sharma, Vijay's son (Uncredited)

== Soundtrack ==
Sameer wrote all songs.

Song	Singer
"O Jaan-E-Jaana"	Asha Bhosle
"Ek Ladki Mujhse"	Amit Kumar
"Seene Se Laga Loon Main, Tujhe Sanson Mein Chhupa Loon Main"	Suresh Wadkar, Sadhana Sargam
"Ek Haseena, Lakh Deewane"	Sapna Mukherjee
"Aa Gale Lag Ja"	Annette Pinto
