= Mayavi Maling =

- Genre: Soap opera
- Screenplay by: Sarang Mahajan
- Story by: Vivek Behl
- Directed by: Dinesh Mahadev Munge; Surajj Rao; Shyam Kalgutkar
- Country of origin: India
- Original language: Hindi
- No. of episodes: 95

Production
- Executive producer: Mayank Pandey
- Producer: Peninsula Pictures
- Production location: Mumbai
- Editors: Ganga Kacharla; Ankush Ambre
- Camera setup: Multi-Camera
- Running time: 21 minutes

Original release
- Network: Star Bharat
- Release: 1 May – 18 August 2018

Mayavi Maling (Enchanted Malinga) also known as The King's Daughters is a Hindi fantasy drama television series that premiered on Star Bharat on 1 May and ended on 18 August 2018.

Set in a fantasy world, the show features Neha Solanki, Vaani Sood and Gracy Goswami as the three princesses – Pranali, Aishwarya and Garima respectively. Actor Shakti Anand essays the role of the Shiladitya, princesses’ father and the King of Maling, whereas Harshad Arora, takes on the role of Angad, the powerful and evil Prince of Mahapuram, a neighbouring kingdom.

== Cast ==
=== Main ===
- Neha Solanki as Maharani Pranali. Queen of the enchanted kingdom of Maling. Eshwarya and Garima's eldest sister, Angad's wife
- Harshad Arora as Yuvraj Angad. Prince of Mahapuram, Pranali's husband
- Aparna Kumar as Maharani Madhumali. Angad's mother, Queen of Mahapuram
- Vaani Sood as Rajkumari Aishwarya. Princess of Maling, Pranali and Garima's sister, Chegu's love-interest
- Ankit Gupta as Chegu, Princess Aishwarya's love-interest
- Gracy Goswami as Rajkumari Garima. Youngest princess of Maling. Pranali and Aishwarya's sister

=== Recurring ===
- Shashwat Tripathi as Adivanth
- Gagan Singh as Arakh
- Shakti Anand as Maharaj Shiladitya, former King of Maling. Pranali, Aishwarya and Garima's father
- Parinita Seth as Maharani Vaidehi
- Preet Kaur Madhan as Maharani Dharini
- Monaz Mevawala as Maharani Bhumi
- Preetika Chauhan as Antara
- Honey Makhani as Haran
- Ashlesha Sawant as Mandari
- Niyati Joshi as Rajmata
- Mamik Singh as Sardar Jaba (Cameo)
- Sargun Kaur Luthra as Maharani Pranali (Fake) (Cameo)
