= Bhrashtachar =

1989 Hindi film directed by Ramesh Sippy

- Poster of Bhrastachar
- Directed by: Ramesh Sippy
- Written by: Manohar Shyam Joshi
- Produced by: G.P.Sippy
- Starring: Mithun Chakraborty; Rajinikanth; Rekha; Shilpa Shirodkar; Anupam Kher; Raza Murad; Anjana Mumtaz; Abhinav Chaturvedi
- Cinematography: K. K. Mahajan
- Edited by: M. S. Shinde
- Music by: Laxmikant Pyarelal
- Distributed by: Sippy Films
- Release date: 22 November 1989
- Running time: 153 min
- Country: India
- Language: Hindi

Bhrashtachar (transl. Corruption) is a 1989 Indian Hindi-language film directed by Ramesh Sippy, produced by G.P.Sippy, starring Mithun Chakraborty, Rekha, Anupam Kher, Raza Murad and Abhinav Chaturvedi, with Rajinikanth in a special appearance. and introduced Shilpa Shirodkar.

== Summary ==
Cunning politician Purshottam is about to contest an election, but Bhavani Dutt a journalist, Ashutosh Das an alcoholic police officer, and Abdul Sattar, a politician are against this move of Purshottam as they know about his criminal activities and the three join hands to bring Purshottam to justice to save the innocent people.

But Purshottam is good enough to plot the trio's fall as Bhavani is arrested for the murder of a prostitute and Abdul Sattar is accused of rape and murder of a blind girl Gopi, while Ashutosh gets fired from the police job itself. The climax shows how the trio gets the punishment for Purshottam.

== Cast ==
- Rekha ... Bhavani Dutt
- Mithun Chakraborty ... Inspector Ashutosh Das
- Rajnikanth ... Abdul Sattar (special appearance)
- Shilpa Shirodkar ... Gopi
- Anupam Kher ... Purshottam
- Raza Murad ... Insp. Zorawar
- Padma Khanna....Janaki, mother of Gopi
- Anjana Mumtaz ... Jayanti Devi (Bhavani's mother)
- Abhinav Chaturvedi ... Gopal (Bhavani's brother)
- Beena ... Deepali Das
- Vikas Anand ... Mohanlal Srivastav Purshottam's Lawyer
- Deep Dhillon ... Deepak Dhillon
- Sudhir Pandey ... Phatte Dada
- Mangal Dhillon ... Mangal
- Bharti Achrekar...Madhavi
- Ajay Wadhavkar..Police Constable Vinayak
- Lalit Mohan Tiwari...Keshav Kumar Income Tax Officer
- Murad.....Judge (special appearance)
- Sunil Shende...Karamveer Ganesh Dutt, Bhavani's Father
- Gopi Desai ... Sunaina, Prostitute
- Amrit Patel ... Dhanmal
- Girija Shankar ... Charan Das
- Vinod Nagpal... Ronakalal

== Soundtrack ==
Bhrashtachar

Film score
- Released: 1989
- Genre: Feature film soundtrack
- Label: T-Series

The lyrics written by Anand Bakshi to the music composed by Laxmikant–Pyarelal.

#	Track	Singer(s)
1	"Yeh Hasina Meree Nind Churati Hai"	Sudesh Bhosle, Kavita Krishnamurthy
2	"Tere Naina Mere Naino Se"	Suresh Wadkar and Anuradha Paudwal
3	"Mere Seene Se Lag Ja"	Alka Yagnik
4	"Oont Wali Se Jo Kare"	Alka Yagnik
5	"Is Duniya Mein Kaun Sunega"	Mohammed Aziz
