= Badmaash (1998 film) =

- Directed by: Goutam Pawar
- Written by: Sayed Sultan
- Screenplay by: Sayed Sultan
- Produced by: Akhtar Shaikh; Anees Sabri
- Starring: Jackie Shroff; Shilpa Shirodkar
- Cinematography: S. Pappu
- Edited by: Vijay Parmar
- Music by: Shyam-Surender
- Release date: 23 January 1998
- Country: India
- Language: Hindi

Badmaash is a 1998 Indian Bollywood Action film directed by Goutam Pawar. The film stars Jackie Shroff, Shilpa Shirodkar in pivotal roles.

== Cast ==
- Jackie Shroff as Gautam Hiraskar
- Shilpa Shirodkar as Geeta
- Paresh Rawal as Lalu Seth
- Bindu as Vimla Hiraskar
- Pran as Kashinath Hiraskar
- Viju Khote as Constable Gawde
- Tej Sapru as Dilip, SharpShooter
- Vikram Gokhale
- Ramesh Bhatkar as Ramya, Gautam Friend
- Shagufta Ali as Shagufta, Gautam Friend
- Pradeep Kumar as Police Commissioner

== Soundtrack ==
Lyrics were penned by Ibrahim Ashq.

Song	Singer
"Jaam Chhalkaye Ja"	Asha Bhosle
"Sari Duniya Kare"	Alka Yagnik
"Pehle Nahin Thi Kabhi Aisi Deewangi"	Kavita Krishnamurthy, Kumar Sanu
"Hona Tha Jo Ho Gaya Hai"	Sadhana Sargam, Kumar Sanu
"Aanchal Dhalne De, Zulf Bikharne De"	Sadhana Sargam, Abhijeet
"Aashiq Aashiq"	Poornima
"Aamchi Mumbai"	Bali Brahmbhatt
"Ya Ela Hi"	Kumar Kancha
