= Jatadhara =

2025 Indian film by Venkat Kalyan & Abhishek Jaiswal

- Theatrical release poster
- Directed by: Venkat Kalyan; Abhishek Jaiswal
- Written by: Venkat Kalyan
- Dialogues by: Venkat Kalyan; Abhishek Jaiswal
- Produced by: Umesh KR Bansal; Rajiv Agarwal; Shivin Narang; Nikhil Nanda; Zee Studios; Sudheer Babu Productions; Ess Kay Gee Entertainment
- Starring: Sudheer Babu; Sonakshi Sinha; Divya Khosla Kumar
- Cinematography: Sameer Kalyani
- Edited by: Venkat Kalyan
- Music by: Samira Koppikar
- Production companies: Zee Studios; Ess Kay Gee Entertainment; Sudheer Babu Productions
- Distributed by: Zee Studios
- Release date: 7 November 2025
- Running time: 135 minutes
- Country: India
- Languages: Telugu; Hindi

Jatadhara (lit. 'Lord Shiva') is a 2025 Indian horror action comedy film written and directed by Venkat Kalyan and Abhishek Jaiswal. Produced by Zee Studios in association with Umesh KR Bansal, Rajiv Agarwal, Shivin Narang, and Nikhil Nanda, the film was shot simultaneously in Telugu and Hindi. It stars Sudheer Babu as Shiva, alongside Sonakshi Sinha in her Telugu debut as the antagonist Dhanapisachini, and Divya Khosla Kumar as Sitara.

The film draws inspiration from myths and conspiracy theories surrounding the Padmanabhaswamy Temple in Kerala, particularly the mystery of its sealed vaults. It explores themes of greed, sacrifice, and spiritual awakening through a fictional narrative set against the backdrop of ancient rituals and divine forces.

Jatadhara was released theatrically on 7 November 2025.

== Plot ==
Set against the backdrop of the sacred Padmanabhaswamy Temple in Kerala, Jatadhara follows Shiva, a man born from sacrifice, who becomes entangled in a web of ancient secrets and supernatural forces. When he uncovers forbidden truths hidden beneath the temple's sealed vaults, he is drawn into a cosmic battle between divinity and greed.

The antagonist, Dhanapisachini—Demon of Greed—emerges to challenge the balance of spiritual power, forcing Shiva to confront his destiny. As myth and mystery collide, the film explores themes of selflessness, devotion, and the eternal struggle between light and darkness.

== Cast ==
- Sudheer Babu as Shiva
- Sonakshi Sinha as Dhanapisachini (Demon of Greed)
- Divya Khosla Kumar as Sitara
- Shilpa Shirodkar as Shobha, Balraj's wife
- Indira Krishnan as Devi, Shiva's mother
- Ravi Prakash as Vasu, Shiva's father
- Jhansi as Shiva's aunt
- Rajeev Kanakala as Shiva's paternal uncle
- Srinivas Avasarala as Manish Sharma
- Rupa Lakshmi
- Chakrapani Ananda
- Subhalekha Sudhakar as Neelakanta Sastri
- Pradeep Rawat
- Rohit Pathak as Balraj, Shiva's maternal uncle
- Naveen Neni
- Alekhya
- Sreedhar Reddy
- Kumanan SK
- Shankar Mahasta
- Master Naga Chaitanya
- Shivin Narang

== Production ==
=== Development ===
Jatadhara was officially announced in August 2023 by Zee Studios. The film was conceptualized as a bilingual supernatural thriller rooted in Indian mythology, with the Padmanabhaswamy Temple serving as its thematic core.

Sudheer Babu was revealed as the lead actor in September 2023, with his role described as “born from sacrifice.” On International Women's Day 2024, Sonakshi Sinha was announced as the female lead, playing the antagonist Dhanapisachini, marking her debut in Telugu cinema. Divya Khosla Kumar was later cast as Sitara, a pivotal character in the spiritual arc of the story. Shilpa Shirodkar joined the ensemble as Shobha, a character described as a symbol of greed and mysticism.

=== Filming ===
Principal photography began in early March 2024 and wrapped in late May 2025 after a 50-day shoot across multiple schedules. The film was shot simultaneously in Telugu and Hindi to cater to a pan-Indian audience. Key sequences were filmed on elaborate sets designed to replicate the interiors of the Padmanabhaswamy Temple, with high-end visual effects integrated to enhance the mythological elements.

The cinematography was handled by Sameer Kalyani, while editing was led by Venkat Kalyan. The production involved a large ensemble cast including Shilpa Shirodkar, Divya Khosla Kumar , Subhalekha Sudhakar, Ravi Prakash, Indira Krishnan, Rajeev Kanakala, and Jhansi, among others. The film's creative team included Divya Vijay as Creative Producer and Bhavini Goswami as Supervising Producer.

== Music ==
The soundtrack of Jatadhara features a blend of spiritual, folk, and contemporary elements, reflecting the film's mythological and supernatural tone. Composed by a team including Samira Koppikar and Raees & Zain-Sam, the music is designed to evoke divine energy, emotional intensity, and cultural resonance.

The first single, titled "Soul of Jatadhara", was released on 25 September 2025. Sung and composed by Rajeev Raj, the track opens with the chant "Om Namah Shivaya" and sets a meditative tone for the film's spiritual journey.

The second single, "Dhana Pisaachi", was released on 30 September 2025 during the Durga Puja festivities. Sung in Hindi by Madhubanti Bagchi and in Telugu by Sahithi Chaganti, the track features Sonakshi Sinha in a fierce avatar as the Goddess of Greed. Composed by Samira Koppikar, the song blends Tandav-inspired rhythms with intense choreography, symbolizing divine wrath and feminine power.

The third single, "Pallo Latke Again", was released on 10 October 2025. A modern reinterpretation of the folk classic, the song features Sudheer Babu and Shreya Sharma in a vibrant dance sequence. Sung in Hindi by Jyotica Tangri and Fazilpuria, and in Telugu by Set Chey Piloda, the track blends traditional melodies with contemporary beats. Composed by Raees & Zain-Sam, the song quickly gained popularity as a festive dance anthem.

=== Track listing ===
Jatadhara – Soundtrack album
No.	Title	Singer(s)	Lyrics	Composer(s)	Language(s)	Length
1	"Soul of Jatadhara"	Rajeev Raj	Traditional	Rajeev Raj	Telugu / Hindi	4:12
2	"Dhana Pisaachi"	Madhubanti Bagchi (Hindi); Sahithi Chaganti (Telugu)	Samira Koppikar; Sri Harsha Emani (Telugu)	Samira Koppikar	Hindi / Telugu	3:58
3	"Pallo Latke Again"	Jyotica Tangri (Hindi); Fazilpuria (Hindi); Set Chey Piloda (Telugu)	Raees & Zain-Sam	Raees & Zain-Sam	Hindi / Telugu	3:45

== Marketing ==
The marketing for Jatadhara began with the release of its teaser on 8 August 2025, unveiled by actor Prabhas. The teaser featured visuals of mythological confrontations, temple rituals, and cosmic battles, highlighting performances by Sudheer Babu and Sonakshi Sinha.

The trailer was launched on 17 October 2025 by Mahesh Babu at a promotional event in Hyderabad, attended by the cast and crew. The event included extended footage from the film and media interactions.

On 19 October 2025, the cast appeared on the Diwali special episode of Bigg Boss Telugu season 9, hosted by Nagarjuna. The segment included interactions with contestants and promotional segments related to the film.

These activities were part of the promotional efforts leading up to the film's theatrical release on 7 November 2025.

== Release ==
Jatadhara was released theatrically on 7 November 2025 in both Telugu and Hindi. The release date was officially announced by the makers in September 2025 through a poster featuring a divine foot stepping onto earth, symbolizing the descent of cosmic power.

The film was distributed by Zee Studios across India, with a pan-Indian release strategy targeting both regional and national audiences.

== Reception ==
Ganesh Aaglave of Firstpost rated the film 3/5 stars and wrote, "Well, the concept is unique, but what lacks is the execution and especially the editing part, as it falters the narrative, leaving the audience confused." Amit Bhatia of ABP Live wrote, "All in all, Jatadhara stands out as a different kind of supernatural thriller — one that mixes mythology, mystery, and faith in an engaging way."

Rishabh Suri of Hindustan Times gave it 2/5 stars and wrote, "Jatadhara is an ambitious blend of myth and modern horror that works in flashes. It reaches for something fresh, but over-the-top theatrics and uneven emotional beats keep it from fully landing, leaving a film that’s part intriguing lore, part muddled chaos." Giving the same rating, Shubhra Gupta of The Indian Express wrote, "Somewhere in this choppy, chaotic enterprise is a film which wants to warn us about the evils of greed, and the importance of tradition. But it is basically yet another Sudheer Babu star vehicle."

T. Maruthi Acharya of India Today gave it 1.5/5 stars and wrote, "Jatadhara has all the trending elements yet none of it comes together. Sudheer Babu and Sonakshi Sinha lend sincerity, but the film's lack of craft and intent makes it a hollow addition to the pan-India wave." Srivathsan Nadadhur of The Hindu wrote, "The writing feels like an exaggerated discourse, glorifying dogmas and superstitions. The treatment is painfully generic, and the performances are uninspiring and rehearsed. There is no authenticity to the setting at all."

Sachi Chaturvedi of News18 gave it 1/5 stars and wrote, "Jatadhara tries to blend mythology, horror, and faith but ends up testing your patience. With weak performances, messy writing, and zero scares, it’s horror in all the wrong ways." Nandini Ramnath of Scroll.in wrote, "Everything in the movie is unabashedly tacky, from the visual effects to the performances. The belief in pseudoscience and sorcery is serious and deep. There appears to be no difference between religion and black magic."
