= Azaad Desh Ke Gulam =

- Directed by: S. A. Chandrasekhar
- Written by: Shoba Chandrasekhar; Anwar Khan
- Based on: Sudhanthira Naattin Adimaigal by S. A. Chandrasekhar
- Produced by: Suresh Bhagat
- Starring: Rishi Kapoor; Rekha; Jackie Shroff; Prem Chopra; Pran
- Edited by: Shyam Mukherjee
- Music by: Laxmikant–Pyarelal
- Production company: Crystal Films
- Distributed by: NH Studioz
- Release date: 6 April 1990
- Country: India
- Language: Hindi

Azaad Desh Ke Gulam (transl. Slaves of a free nation) is an Indian Hindi-language film released on 6 April, starring Rishi Kapoor, Rekha, and Jackie Shroff in lead roles. The film was a remake of the Tamil film Sudhanthira Naattin Adimaigal. The film was a hit.

== Plot ==
Bharti Bhandari lives a wealthy lifestyle with her mom, Sharda, and dad, Ashok. She studies in law college, where she is in love with fellow-collegian Vijay Srivastav. Another colleague, Vicky, who is also smitten with Bharti, tells her that Ashok has made millions not by a legitimate business but by smuggling, kidnapping, and selling children and young women. Bharti is shocked; she confronts her father, but he denies everything. Satisfied that her dad would not lie to her, she goes for a trip to Goa along with Vijay, and that's where she actually sees her dad, who is supposed to be in London, U.K., smuggling some children abroad on a yacht. Bharti and Vijay find out that Ashok has vital documents that will lead to India being taken over by a foreign power, and they decide to put a stop to this. Before they could do anything, Vijay was killed. When Bharti confronts her parents, it results in arguments, which escalate to a physical struggle, leading to the death of Sharda, and subsequently Bharti shoots Ashok to death. Bharti takes the documents and runs away to distant Ooty in a bid to escape the murder charge and bring the documents to the appropriate authorities. But Ashok's associates find out, and she becomes their target; she hires a bodyguard named Jamliya, who proves to be unreliable. Bharti will now find that her worst nightmare comes true when a couple claiming to be her mom and dad surface out of nowhere, backed up by none other than her very own paternal uncle, Kishore Bhandari. The motive was to prove her insane. But the question remains: what will Kishore and her new parents gain by proving her insanity, or is this nothing but her mind playing tricks on her? Later, after Bharti confesses her crime of killing her father, Jamliya turns out to be the inspector who was behind Bharti. Now that Bharti was in jail, the inspector (Jamliya) asked for the papers. She refuses and asks the inspector to treat that minister without his uniform. Bharti was kidnapped by the minister. Later, Vijay saves Bharti, and later they fight a case against the minister. The minister was sentenced, but while leaving the court, his men attacked them. In that fight, Vijay throws a rope at the minister to stop him, which leads him to be hanged to death.

== Cast ==
- Rishi Kapoor as Vijay Shrivastav / Chanakya
- Rekha as Bharati Bhandari
- Jackie Shroff as Inspector Jai Kishan / Jamliya
- Prem Chopra as Minister Narayan Das
- Pran as Ashok Bhandari
- Ashalata Wabgaonkar as Sharda Bhandari
- Ramesh Deo as Kishore Bhandari
- Rakesh Bedi as Constable Kaushik Kulkarni / Daulatram
- Mangal Dhillon as Mangal
- Mahavir Shah as Vicky
- Tiku Talsania as MLA Nagendra Rao
- Sudhir Dalvi as Father Francis
- Vikas Anand as Jailor Mohan Kapoor
- Rajan Haksar as Police Inspector Tiwari

== Songs ==
All lyrics are written by Sameer Anjaan. Soundtrack available on T-Series.

No.	Title	Singer(s)	Length
1.	"O Dafli Dam Dam Bole"	Nitin Mukesh
2.	"Saare Shikwe Gile Bhoolake Kaho" (Sad)	Mohammed Aziz
3.	"Saare Shikwe Gile Bhoolake Kaho""	Mohammed Aziz, Anuradha Paudwal
4.	"Roko Zulmon Ki Aandhi Ko"	Mohammed Aziz, Kavita Krishnamurthy
5.	"Kukkad Kukkad Ku, Main Aur Tu"	Shabbir Kumar, Anupama Deshpande
