= Bandish (1996 film) =

1996 film by Prakash Jha

- Theatrical release poster
- Directed by: Prakash Jha
- Produced by: Prakash Jha
- Starring: Jackie Shroff; Juhi Chawla; Paresh Rawal; Shilpa Shirodkar; Himani Shivpuri; Guddi Maruti
- Cinematography: Rajan Kinagi
- Music by: Anand–Milind
- Release date: 23 February 1996
- Country: India
- Language: Hindi

Bandish (transl. Restriction) is a 1996 Indian Hindi-language romantic thriller film directed by Prakash Jha, starring Jackie Shroff, Juhi Chawla and Shilpa Shirodkar.

== Plot ==
Ram Ghulam, an honest man, is trapped in the cities by Kishan. The film has elements of romance, action and tragedy.

== Cast ==
- Jackie Shroff as Ram Ghulam / Kishan (Dual role)
- Juhi Chawla as Kanta
- Shilpa Shirodkar
- Kader Khan
- Paresh Rawal
- Guddi Maruti
- Sanjay Mishra
- Raghubir Yadav
- Goga Kapoor
- Brij Gopal
- Suresh Bhagwat
- Mahendra Varma
- Sudhir Pandey
- Rajendra Gupta
- Himani Shivpuri
- Prakashchandra Dwivedi

== Music ==
Soundtrack composed by Anand-Milind, with lyrics penned by Sameer. The music album includes a blend of romantic and lively tracks, performed by renowned playback singers such as Kumar Sanu, Alka Yagnik, Poornima, Udit Narayan, and Ila Arun. Most popular songs in album "Maine Apna Dil De Diya", "Bole Mora Kangna" etc.

No.	Title	Singer(s)	Length
1.	"Maine Apna Dil De Diya"	Kumar Sanu, Alka Yagnik	5:02
2.	"Bole Mera Kangana"	Kumar Sanu, Alka Yagnik	5:51
3.	"Main Ho Gaya Athara Saal Ki"	Bela Sulakhe, Ila Arun	6:13
4.	"Aaa Tujhe Main Pyar Doon"	Kumar Sanu, Poornima	6:56
5.	"Na Mili Kahin Woh Heroine"	Udit Narayan, Sapna Mukherjee, Jolly Mukherjee & Arun Ingle	8:35
6.	"Teetar Teetar"	Poornima, Udit Narayan	6:16
7.	"Zindagi Se Maut Ki Mulaqat Hai"	Poornima	6:01
Total length:			44:54
