= Phir Subah Hogi =

- Genre: Drama
- Created by: Miracle Workers; Panglosean Entertainment a wholly owned subsidiary of Sphere Origins
- Written by: Ved Raj; Shweta Bhardwaj; Rajesh Dubey; Raghuvir Shekhawat
- Directed by: Rajesh Ram Singh; Wasmeem Sabir
- Starring: Gulki Joshi Narayani Shastri Anuj Sachdeva Nandish Sandhu Varun Badola
- Country of origin: India
- No. of seasons: 1
- No. of episodes: 242

Production
- Producers: Sourabh Shrivastava; Rajesh Chadha; Sunjoy Waddhawa
- Production location: Bundelkhand
- Cinematography: Shailesh Monare
- Editor: Swapnil
- Camera setup: Multi camera
- Production companies: Miracle Workers (production company)|Miracle Workers; Panglosean Entertainment a wholly owned subsidiary of Sphere Origins

Original release
- Network: Zee TV
- Release: April 17, 2012 – March 22, 2013

Phir Subah Hogi (International title: Breaking Free) is an Indian soap opera series that was being aired on Zee TV from 2012 to 2013. It was mainly about the Bediya community of the Bundelkhand region, Madhya Pradesh. It was shot in Wai village near Mahabaleshwar.

The show was dubbed in English and aired on Zee World on DSTv channel 166.

== Plot ==
In a village in India, live the Bednis, a community in which young women and girls dance before rich men (the landlords) who pick up the girls of their choice. Sugni, a girl who does not like this custom, tries everything possible to stop it. She states the importance of belonging to only one man. Because of her bravery, a landlord named Vikram Thakur Singh falls in love with her. They plan to marry even though everyone opposes it, including Gulabi, Sugni's mother. Gulabi discovers that Riva, Vikram's wife, is still alive (she was believed to be dead after a car accident a year ago). Gulabi tries to caution Sugni who does not believe her, being blinded by love. Gulabi tells Aditya, Vikram's nephew, about the fact that Riva was still alive and they manage to expose Vikram to Sugni on their wedding day.

Heartbroken, Sugni decides to return to being a Bedni. When she tries to sell herself, Aditya buys her as a servant in their house. Vikram becomes possessive and tries to divorce Riva so that he can marry Sugni, but fails. Riva then suggests to Sugni that she should marry Aditya so that Vikram would come back to her. Later, Aditya and Sugni decide to get married. At this same time, Vikram's mother, Maa Thakur, arrives with his sister-in-law, Suman, and her husband. When Maa Thakur discovers that Aditya is going to marry Sugni, she gives her consent. But on their marriage day, Vikram reveals that Sugni is a Bedni. At first, Maa Thakur despises Sugni and tries to disown Aditya for marrying a dancing girl, but later agrees to have them isolated in the house. Everyone blames Sugni for breaking the family's unity.

Even after her marriage to Aditya, Vikram lusts after Sugni and manages to get a night with her after threatening to kill Aditya in a wrestling sport where knives are used. Aditya learns about this and begins to hate Sugni, but takes her back after clearing the misunderstanding. In the meantime, Vikram's youngest sister, Kuhu, marries Digvijay, the son of Vikram's enemy, Jwala Thakur Singh. Digvijay doesn't love Kuhu and instead wants Champa, Sugni's friend, after raping her. Sugni tries to reveal this fact to the family, but fails. She later deceives Digvijay into exposing himself. Maa Thakur starts liking Sugni. Vikram, going to the extreme, plots to kill Aditya, and convinces Aditya and Sugni to spend some time at a house. Later, Vikram realises his mistake and tries to save Aditya, but Sugni gets shot instead and falls down a cliff. Overcome with guilt, Vikram wanders away into the unknown.

Six months later, Suman takes over the mansion and makes Digvijay and Jwala Singh owners as well. Vikram walks into a city that is full of courtesans, among whom is a girl named Chulbuli, who looks like Sugni. Vikram meets Chulbuli and tries to convince her that she is Sugni. Chulbuli is dating Divakar. Vikram discovers that the kotha owner and her son, Bunty, are trying to do something to Chulbuli. He wonders why a hooded man keeps on giving them strange medicines. On the other hand, Chulbuli gets strange, faint memories about her past.

Back at the mansion, Riva starts playing mind games with Suman and gets her look-alike, Jamuniya, to pretend to be Suman whenever she is out. Riva manages to transfer the property back to Maa Thakur. Vikram discovers why the kotha owner had been giving Chulbuli the medicines: she wanted to give Chulbuli a new life by using the medicines to make her forget about her past. Vikram discovers how Sugni was rescued from the river she had fallen into by some local fishermen. Vikram then takes Sugni back to the mansion. Riva discovers that Vikram is still in love with Sugni and so divorces him. Aditya comes back and he and Maa Thakur tell Vikram to marry Sugni. Sugni is feeling stressed as her memories are flooding back to her. Vikram and Sugni get married. During the seven rounds around the sacred fire, Sugni remembers doing this before and regains her memory. Sugni is convinced by Aditya that her marriage to him was never meant to be. The wedding of Vikram and Sugni has finally taken place.

== Cast ==
- Gulki Joshi as Sugni
- Varun Badola as Thakur Vikram Singh
- Anuj Sachdeva / Nandish Sandhu as Thakur Aditya Singh
- Jaya Binju as Thakurayin Reva Singh
- Narayani Shastri as Gulabia
- Suman Shashi Kant as Badi Thakurayin Suman
- Ravindra Mankani / Sai Ballal as Thakur Jwala Singh
- Ramit Thakur as Thakur Diwakar Singh
- Nimai Bali as Hukum
- Garima Vikrant Singh as Hukum's wife
- Sikandar Kharbanda as Katari
- Anushree Bhatia
- Ankit Arora as Thakur Digvijay Singh
- Shruti Bisht as Sugni Niwas
- Jyoti Gauba as Thakurayin
- Mamta Luthra as Dhanu Maa
- Krutika Desai as Maa Thakurayin
- Rajlaxmi Solanki as Aditya's mother
- Priyanka Panchal as Amrita
- Vandana Singh as Champa
