= Kaarthika (TV series) =

- Genre: Drama
- Created by: Ekta Kapoor
- Starring: Jennifer Winget; Abhay Vakil; Aditya Vaidya
- Opening theme: "Iraade... I Have It In Me"
- Ending theme: "I can do it"
- Country of origin: India
- Original language: Hindi
- No. of seasons: 1
- No. of episodes: 52

Production
- Executive producer: Ekta Kapoor
- Producers: Ekta Kapoor; Shobha Kapoor
- Running time: 30 minutes
- Production company: Balaji Telefilms

Original release
- Network: Hungama TV
- Release: 27 September – 23 December 2004

Kaarthika is an Indian children's show that aired on Hungama TV from 27 September 2004 to 23 December 2004 and was later syndicated on Disney Channel India from 2008 to 2009. It was produced by Balaji Telefilms.

== Plot ==
Kartika is a nice singer and dreams of being a film star. She asks her father and mother to get her admitted to a singing academy. At first, they do not agree, but she manages to persuade them. At the academy, she makes new friends and rivals. She shares her room with Ankana, a bad but popular girl who always insults her and gets her into trouble.

== Cast ==
=== Main ===
- Jennifer Winget as Kartika
- Aditya Vaidya as Ritwik
- Ankana Mehra as Bonita
- Abhay Vakil as Abhishek
- Arjun Bijlani as Ankush

=== Recurring ===
- Monica Kale as Meenakshi
- Swati as Ash
- Shikha as Sush
- Mitika Sharma as Sweta
- Resham Tipnis as Sushma
- Sanjeev Seth
- Aarti as Brinda
- Monica Kale as Tanya
- Daljeet Kaur
