= Tera Kya Hoga Alia =

2019 Indian TV series

- Also known as: Carry on Alia
- Genre: Comedy
- Starring: See below
- Country of origin: India
- Original language: Hindi
- No. of seasons: 2
- No. of episodes: 229

Production
- Executive producer: Aayush Agrawal
- Producer: Vipul D Shah
- Camera setup: Multi-camera
- Running time: 21 minutes
- Production company: Optimystix Entertainment

Original release
- Network: Sony SAB
- Release: 27 August 2019 – 23 October 2020

Tera Kya Hoga Alia (transl. What will happen to you, Alia?) is an Indian Hindi-language television comedy series. The show was produced by Vipul D Shah through Optimystix Entertainment on Sony SAB. The first season was broadcast from 27 August 2019 to 28 August 2020 and depicted Alia as a former beauty queen who teaches history. The series was revamped and was retitled Carry on Alia for its the second season. Season two premiered on 31 August 2020 and ended on 23 October 2020 when the series was cancelled. It depicted Alia as an honest television reporter at odds with Dhadkan, a glamorous, dishonest anchor who only cares about ratings.

== Series overview ==
| Season | Title | No. of episodes | Originally broadcast (India) | |
| Season | Title | No. of episodes | First aired | Last aired |
|---|---|---|---|---|
| 1 | Tera Kya Hoga Alia | 189 | 27 August 2019 | 28 August 2020 |
| 2 | Carry on Alia | 40 | 31 August 2020 | 23 October 2020 |

== Plot ==
=== Season 1: Tera Kya Hoga Alia ===
Set in Agra, Mrs. Alia Alok Parihar becomes insecure about her growing weight. She and her friend Rabiya try to keep women away from Alia's handsome husband Alok, though Alok is committed to Alia and maintains a distance from women. Alia and Alok work together in the same Hindi medium school as history and physical training (PT) teachers, respectively. Tara Kohli joins the school as an English teacher and considers Alok as only her friend but Alia becomes insecure of Tara's beauty and charm. Tara is later promoted as vice-principal of the school.

Believing that her son Rohan can foresee the future through his drawings and has a vision about her death, Alia tries to search for a new wife for Alok and a mother for Rohan. She offers the role to Tara, who is initially reluctant but becomes attracted to Alok's charm and softheartedness. Alia signs an agreement that Tara will still marry Alok if Alia doesn't die. When the prediction is understood to be about something else, Alia apologizes to Tara and Alok. Obsessed with Alok, Tara fakes amnesia, invents stories of her marriage with Alok, and bribes a doctor who asks Alia and Alok to care for her and indulge her marriage fantasy. Her mother Simran arrives from Delhi and helps her to impress Alok. Alia learns about the conspiracy but fails to prove it to Alok. Later, Tara tries to defame Alia and creates hurdles for her while both participate in the Mrs. Agra contest. Affluent journalist Rohit befriends and helps Alia, much to Alok's insecurity, and she wins the contest.

Following the COVID-19 lockdown, during which the school building became a quarantine centre, Simran's affluent friend Saudamini Sahu becomes the school principal and restructures it as an international English-medium school in a new building. All the teachers had to leave the teacher's colony and share homes, with Alia, Alok and Tara cohabiting. Alia works with the other Hindi teachers to impress the parents and school committee and save their jobs. It is decided to teach the students online. Alia struggles with conflicts from vice-principal Tara and the continuing pandemic. Later, Simran tries to legitimately marry Alok and Tara, but Alok puts a halt to it. Tara and Simran are exposed at the wedding venue and apologize. Alok and Alia are remarried while Tara and Simran return to South Delhi. During the Ganesh Chaturthi festival, Saudamini decides to close the school due to financial loss, leaving the teachers unemployed. Rohit offers the teachers the opportunity to work for a news channel, to which they agree.

=== Season 2: Carry on Alia ===
Alia and the other teachers become reporters at television channel Desh Ki Dhadkan (English: Country's Heart Beat). Famous anchor Ms. Dhadkan of show Apki Dhadkan Boli (Bid Your Heart) covers entertainment, glamour and sensational stories, but Alia determines to cover important stories and show the truth.

In one of her first news investigations, Alia uncovers a fiasco and gains national praise. This results in Alia getting her own show, Carry on Alia, which soon outperforms Dhadkan's show in the ratings. Although they occasionally cooperate, Dhadkan's jealousy of Alia's popularity grows and she plots against the newcomer. When it is decided that Alia will be promoted, Dhadkan attempts to frame Alia for the robbery of funds intended for pregnant women. Alia is arrested but exonerated when her team expose Dhadkan's conspiracy with a rival television channel.

== Cast ==
=== Main ===
- Anusha Mishra as Alia Parihar - Alok's wife; Rohan's mother; a history teacher and vice-principal of the Hindi medium school; later a television field reporter.
- Harshad Arora as Alok Parihar - Alia's husband; Rohan's father; PT teacher of the school; later a television sports and health reporter.
- Priyanka Purohit as Tara Kohli - an English teacher and vice-principal of the English medium school. (Season 1)
  - Chhavi Pandey replaced Priyanka Purohit as Tara.
- Jiya Mustafa as Dhakan - Alia's colleague and the anchor of Aap Ki Dhadkan Boli. She is self-centred and only cares about television ratings.

=== Recurring ===
- Namrata Pathak as Rabia Merchant - Alia's best friend; a librarian; later an entertainment reporter. She is married to Mr. Merchant. She had a catchphrase "Merchant to gaya Dubai".
- Smita Singh as Durga Parihar - Alok's mother; Alia's mother-in-law. She is often seen arguing with her childhood friend Abha who is Alia's mother. Also they both provide catering business to the school and the bureau office.
- Jhumma Mitra as Abha - Alia's mother; Alok's mother-in-law.
- Atharv Johnny as Rohan Parihar - Alia and Alok's son.
- Neelu Kohli as Principal Saudamini Sahu. She is strict, wealthy, and cares about funds and hence often says "Money is what matters!".
- Rakhi Vijan as Simran Kohli - Tara's snobbish mother; Saudamini's Friend. She helps Tara in her plan to marry Alok. She is a wealthy lady from South Delhi.
- Karan Veer Mehra as Rohit Khanna, a journalist and Alia's helpful friend.
- Deepak Pareek as Mr. Vajpayee - Rohit's boss.
- Neelesh Malviya as Rajesh Bhadoriya - Shalini's husband. He often tries to impress Shalini but fails due to his father-in-law. His catchphrase is "Zalim and Jaaneman".
- Gouri M. Sharma as Shalini Tomar Bhadoriya + Rajesh's fiancée; a crafts teacher; later a receptionist at the television station.
- Abhay Pratap Singh as Gopal 'GK' Kumar - a mathematics teacher; later a stock market reporter. He often says "Babu" (English: Dude).
- Rahul Singh as Nandan - the peon of the school. He holds a degree in law and often loses his cool when somebody does not listen to him; later a researcher for the television station along with Alia.
- Ayush Agarwal as Merchant - Rabiya's husband; a music teacher; later an entertainment reporter.
- Jiten Mukhi as Colonel - Durga's brother; Alok's maternal uncle; Abha's friend who also has a crush on her.
- Jitendra Vashist as D.K. Sinha - Principal of Gyan Sarovar School; later a political news reporter.
- Bhakti Chauhan as Mrs. Sinha - D.K. Sinha's wife.
- Neel Motwani as Kunal - Tara's friend and her ex-fiancé.(2019-2020)
- Shiny Dixit as Kavya Klinton.
- Aarvika Gupta as Yashika Dubey.

== Kuch Smiles Ho Jayein... With Alia ==
Kuch Smiles Ho Jayein... With Alia is an Indian Game show which was made at home during the COVID-19 lockdown in India and aired on Sony SAB. It was hosted by Anusha Mishra as Alia and Balraj Syal. It was completely shot remotely. Mishra and Syal invited the star cast of Sony SAB's Tera Kya Hoga Alia, Tenali Rama, Baalveer Returns, Bhakharwadi, Aladdin – Naam Toh Suna Hoga, Apna News Aayega and Maddam Sir to play games remotely. The series ended on 1 June 2020 after five episodes.

== See also ==
- List of programs broadcast by Sony SAB
- List of Hindi comedy shows
