= Bandhan – Saari Umar Humein Sang Rehna Hai =

Indian drama television series

- Also known as: Ek Se Bhale Do
- Genre: Soap opera
- Created by: Swastik Productions
- Screenplay by: Jaya Misra
- Story by: Ved Raj; Sudhir Kumar
- Directed by: Mukesh kumarSingh; Rakesh Dubey
- Starring: Chhavi Pandey; Mrunal Jain; Priyanka Purohit; Sudesh Berry
- Theme music composer: Dony Hazarika
- Country of origin: India
- Original language: Hindi
- No. of seasons: 1
- No. of episodes: 161

Production
- Producers: Siddharth Kumar Tewary; Rahul Tewary; Gayatri Gill Tewary
- Camera setup: Multi camera
- Running time: 21 mins
- Production company: Swastik Productions

Original release
- Network: Zee TV
- Release: 16 September 2014 – 17 April 2015

Bandhan – Saari Umar Humein Sang Rehna Hai is an Indian television drama show, which premiered on 16 September 2014 and aired on Zee TV until 17 April 2015. It replaced Ek Mutthi Aasmaan in its timeslot. The story of the film is about the bond between a little girl named Darpan, and her adopted brother, Ganesh the elephant. The show took a 10-year leap in the episode of 27 January 2015.

== Plot ==
Darpan Karnik is a school-going aged girl who lives with her parents Mahesh and Prabha and is happy in her life. She also has an adopted brother, Ganesh, who is an elephant. Mahesh is a forest ranger and is determined to expose Vishwasrao Patil, a politician, for his illegal activities regarding elephants. Vishwasrao befriends Darpan and gets successful in getting information about Mahesh's plan to expose him. He abducts Prabha so that he can reach Mahesh. When Mahesh comes to save Prabha, Vishwasrao kills both of them and Mahesh is termed a thief by everyone. Vishwasrao takes Darpan to his house as he is still doubtful about Mahesh's death as his dead body wasn't found, and hopes that Mahesh can return for Darpan. In his house, there is his arrogant and egoistic wife named Meethi, his younger brother Suryapratap and his wife Sheetal and their children Sanju and Pinky, his younger brother Devpratap who is stammer and is about to marry Payal, his evil sister Shakuntala and an orphan kid named Raghavendra "Raghav".

Darpan is harassed regularly in that house by Meethi, Shakuntala and Devpratap. Devpratap attempts to molest a dancer named Kajri and Vishwasrao gets him married to her as punishment. Darpan also gets bullied by Raghav, Sanju and Pinky who also turn to be her bullies at school, but later Raghav reforms and befriends Darpan. Narayani Deshpande, an animal activist, saves Ganesh and unites Darpan with him. Later, it's revealed that Narayani is actually Vishwasrao's ex-girlfriend and Raghav is their biological son. Darpan soon learns that Vishwasrao had murdered her parents and determines to seek justice for them. Vishwasrao kills Narayani when she threatens to expose him while Darpan is blamed for the murder.

Kajri encourages Darpan to escape to save her from Vishwasrao's family who attempt to harm her. She escapes but falls into a sea and is presumed dead by the family. A childless couple finds Darpan and decides to raise her as their own daughter.

10 years later

Darpan has lost her memory and has grown into a lovely young woman. She is now known as Riya Khare. She meets Ganesh but fails to recognize him. She is arranged to marry Raghav who gets to know that Riya is Darpan. Darpan regains her memory and gets determined to punish Vishwasrao who murdered her biological parents. Raghav promises to make Darpan's life hell and torture her to death as he still believes that she killed Narayani. Darpan gets to know that Vishwasrao has killed Kajri and kidnapped Devpratap and Kajri's daughter. Soon, Darpan reveals her true identity, proves her innocence and exposes Vishwasrao in front of the Patil family. Darpan saves Kajri and Devpratap's daughter and brings her back. A fire breaks out in the house and everyone manage to leave, except Vishwasrao and Darpan. Raghav saves Darpan and leaves Vishwasrao to die. Darpan and Raghav start living happily with the Patil family and Ganesh, and the show ends on a happy note.

== Cast ==
- Chhavi Pandey as Darpan Raghavendra Patil (née Karnik) (alias Riya Khare): Mahesh and Prabha's daughter; Raghavendra's wife (2015)
  - Ananya Agarwal as Child Darpan Karnik (2014–2015)
- Suman (Elephant) as Ganesh: Darpan's adopted brother (2014–15)
- Mrunal Jain as Raghavendra "Raghav" Patil / Sameer Sen: Vishwasrao and Narayani's son; Meethi's stepson; Darpan's husband; Sanju and Pinky's elder cousin (2015)
- Sudesh Berry as Vishwasrao Tagdu Patil: Meethi's husband; Narayani's ex-boyfriend and murderer; Prabha and Mahesh's murderer; Devpratap and Suryapratap's elder brother Shakuntala's brother; Raghavendra's father
- Aditya Redij as Mahesh Karnik: Prabha's husband; Darpan's father (2014) (Dead)
- Shweta Munshi as Prabha Mahesh Karnik: Mahesh's wife; Darpan's mother (2014) (Dead)
- Priyanka Purohit as Pinky Patil: Suryapratap and Sheetal's daughter; Raghavendra's younger cousin; Sanju's younger sister (2015)
  - Gracy Goswami as Child Pinky Patil (2014–2015)
- Unknown / Aashish Mehrotra as Sanjay "Sanju" Patil: Suryapratap and Sheetal's son; Pinky's elder brother; Raghavendra's younger cousin
- Meenal Pendse / Sunila Karambelkar as Meethi Patil: Vishwasrao's wife; Raghavendra's stepmother
- Monica Bedi as Narayani Deshpande: Vishwasrao's ex-girlfriend; Raghavendra's mother (2015) (Dead)
- Sushmita Mukherjee as Shakuntala Apte: Vishwasrao, Devpratap and Suryapratap's elder sister
- Anirudh Dave as Devpratap Patil: Kajri's husband; Shakuntala, Surya and Vishwasrao's brother
- Snigdha Akolkar as Kajri Devpratap Patil: Devpratap's wife
- Bhanujeet Sudan as Suryapratap Patil: Sheetal's husband; Sanju and Pinky's father; Vishwasrao, Shakuntala and Devpratap's brother
- Piyali Munshi as Sheetal Suryapratap Patil: Surya's wife; Sanju and Pinky's mother
- Meenu Panchal as Kajal
- Shubhi Ahuja as Payal: Devpratap's former fiancée
- Suman Shashi Kant as Devi
- Devish Ahuja as Child Raghavendra "Raghav" Patil (2014)
- Ravi Mishra as Dr. Ayush

== Abuse of elephant ==
The makers of the show have been facing opposition from Animal Welfare Board of India (AWBI) and animal rights organization, PETA India for abusing baby elephant, Suman, who is a central character in the show. According to media reports, AWBI and PETA conducted an inspection and found out that elephant, Suman, was treated poorly on the sets. Suman had developed skin infection and exhibited abnormal behaviour. Handlers also reportedly threatened her with sticks in front of the inspectors and she was not provided with adequate access to drinking water, appropriate housing or necessary veterinary care. Suman, the baby elephant, is three years old and separating her from her mother has been called 'unethical' by PETA.

According to a news published in Times of India, AWBI has canceled the permission to use the animal after which makers of the show went to Bombay High Court. The case is under sub-judice.

PETA India has urged High Court to rehabilitate Suman to a sanctuary.
