= Mangal Dhillon =

Indian actor (1957–2023)

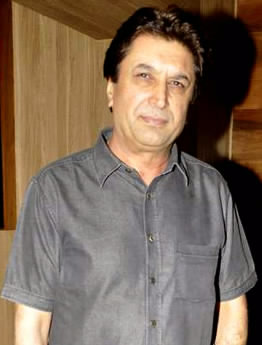
- Dhillon in 2013
- Born: Mangal Singh Dhillon; 18 June 1957; Wander Jatana, Punjab, India
- Died: 11 June 2023 (aged 65); Ludhiana, Punjab, India
- Education: Post Graduate from Indian Theatre, Panjab University, Chandigarh
- Occupations: Actor, Writer, Director, Producer
- Height: 1.78 m (5 ft 10 in)
- Website: www.mangaldhillon.in

Mangal Singh Dhillon (18 June 1957 – 11 June 2023) was an Indian actor, writer, director and film producer, born in Wander Jatana near Kotkapura in Faridkot district, Punjab.

== Early life ==
Mangal Dhillon was born into a Sikh family in the village of Wander Jatana, in Faridkot district of the Indian state of Punjab. He studied in Panj Graayin Kalan Government school until 4th Standard. He then moved to Uttar Pradesh near his father's farm. He graduated from Zila Parishad High School in Nighasan, Lakhimpur Kheri district. He then returned to Punjab where he completed his higher secondary from Kotkapura. He graduated from Muktsar Government College.

Dhillon worked in theatre in Delhi and joined Indian Theatre department at Panjab University, Chandigarh in 1979 and completed his post-graduate diploma course in acting in 1980.

== Personal life and death ==
Mangal Singh Dhillon married artist Ritu Dhillon in 1994. The couple have one son and a daughter.

Dhillon died after long suffering from cancer in Ludhiana, Punjab, on 11 June 2023. He was 65.

== Filmography ==
=== Television ===
Year	Serial	Role	Notes
1986	Katha Sagar		
1986	Buniyaad	Lubhaya Ram	
1993	Junoon	Sumer Rajvansh	
	Kismat		
1994–1995	The Great Maratha	Dattaji Scindia	
1996–1998	Panther	Panther	
	Ghutan		
	Sahil		
	Maulana Azad	Maulana Azad	
	Mujrim Hazir		
	Rishta		
	Lahoo Ke Phool	Decoit	
1988	Param Vir Chakra	Col. Hoshiar Singh	
	Apane Paraye		
1996–1998	Yug (TV series)	King	
2000	Noorjahan (TV Series)	Emperor Akbar	

=== Feature films ===
Year	Film	Role	Notes
1988	Khoon Bhari Maang	Advocate	
1988	Zakhmi Aurat	Mehta	
1988	Dayavan	Chhote Anna	
1989	Kahan Hai Kanoon	Peter	
1989	Apna Desh Paraye Log	Advocate Sharma	
1989	Bhrashtachar	Mangal	
1990	Naaka Bandi	Police Inspector Satyaprakash	
1990	Azaad Desh Ke Gulam	Mangal	
1990	Amba	Thakur Shamsher Singh	
1990	Nyay Anyay	Inspector Khan	
1991	Pyar Ka Devta	Murli M Rai	
1991	Ranbhoomi	Chandan Henchman	
1991	Akayla	Advocate	
1991	Swarg Yahan Narak Yahan	Inspector Aslam	
1991	Lakshmanrekha	Jabbar Khan	
1992	Vishwatma	Madan Bhardwaj	
1992	Zindagi Ek Juaa	Mangal Jagjit Singh JJ Assistant	
1993	Yugandhar	Gora Thakur	
1993	Sahibaan	Police Inspector / Daroga	
1993	Dil Tera Aashiq	Mr James	
1993	Dalaal	Jagga Seth	
1995	Nishana	Police officer	
1996	Yash	Vikram Rai	
	Nagmani	Snake Charmer	
1998	Train to Pakistan	Punjab Police A.S.I.	
1999	Khalsa		
2003	Janasheen	Jaichand	
2017	Toofan Singh	Lakha	

== Production house ==
Dhillon formed a production company and released a well-received historical film entitled Khalsa. His other productions include A Day at the Golden Temple-(about the 24 hours holy practice every day)", Prakash Sri Guru Granth Sahib (in 2004 about the uniqueness of Guru Granth Sahib), Sikh Ate Dastaar, The Inseparable-A Sikh and his Turban, (about the unbreakable bond of every Sikh with his turban & long hair) Sarvnash – (in 2007 against drug abuse) Gurbani De Kautak Part-1 and Part-2 (in 2009–2010 about the divine healing powers of Gurbani) Toshakhana Sri Darbar Sahib (about the priceless articles kept at Toshakhana) and Ḧarinam Ke Chamatkar (a documentary about the divine healing powers of Harinam).

Forthcoming projects included Shahadat (a feature film, about politics of votes & countless other social issues of Punjab, India & NRIs), Ä Western Salutation to Sikhism (about the devotion, faith & conviction of western people who embraced Sikhism) Saaka-Sarhind (a docu-drama film about the martyrdom of the sons of Sri Guru Gobind Singh ji), and Gurbani De Kautak Parts 3, 4 and 5 (documentary films about the divine healing powers of spiritual hymns of Sri Guru Granth Sahib) and many others.

== Awards ==
- For his role in television serial Junoon, he won the RAPA (Radio and Television Advertising Practitioners' Association) award for best actor in 1998.
- He was honored with Baba Farid Award by Punjab Government for the film Khalsa
- An outstanding achievement award from Chief Minister Punjab in 2006 as well as various other recognitions from organizations all over Punjab and abroad.
- He was awarded the Mohan Rakesh Gold Medal for best actor.
