= Shilpa Shirodkar =

Indian actress (born 1973)

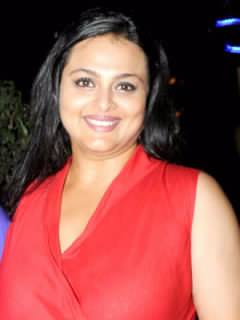
- Shirodkar in 2014
- Born: 20 November 1973 (age 52)
- Occupation: Actress
- Years active: 1989–2000, 2013–2020, 2024-present
- Spouse: Aparesh Ranjit (m. 2000)
- Children: 1
- Relatives: Namrata Shirodkar (sister); Mahesh Babu (brother-in-law)

Shilpa Shirodkar (born 20 November 1973) is an Indian actress and former photo model who worked primarily in Hindi-language films from 1989 to 2000. After a 13-year hiatus from acting, she made her comeback to acting, this time on television in the Zee TV series Ek Mutthi Aasmaan in 2013. In 2024, she participated in Bigg Boss 18.

== Career ==
Shirodkar made her debut with Ramesh Sippy's film Bhrashtachar (1989), with Mithun Chakraborty and Rekha, in which she played the role of a blind girl. She starred opposite Anil Kapoor in the hit 1990 film Kishen Kanhaiya. The following year she had successful films like Trinetra (1991) and Hum (1991). She appeared in several other hit films such as Khuda Gawah (1992), Aankhen (1993), Pehchaan (1993), Gopi Kishan (1994), Bewafa Sanam (1995) and Mrityudand (1997). She decided to quit acting after marriage and her last film appearance was in the 2000 film Gaja Gamini. She was nominated for the Filmfare Award for Best Supporting Actress in 1993 for Khuda Gawah. Shilpa paired in nine films with Mithun Chakraborty and fans appreciated their onscreen pairing.

She took a 13-year hiatus from show business to raise her family in London and in 2013 made her comeback on television after shifting residence to Mumbai. The first shooting location was in a Delhi suburb for her comeback, Zee TV's new show Ek Mutthi Aasmaan, based on the life of domestic helpers. The series finished in late 2014.

Her second television serial Silsila Pyar Ka aired on Star Plus on 4 January 2016 and ended six months later in June. From May 2017 to September 2018, she appeared in the Colors TV serial Savitri Devi College & Hospital.

In February 2020, she made a comeback to films playing a supporting role in Guns of Banaras, a film which had been completed in 2014 but was delayed for six years.. In 2025, she appeared in the Telugu-Hindi bilingual film Jatadhara.

== Personal life ==
Born to Marathi actress Gangu Bai on 20 November 1973, Shilpa is the younger sister of actress and former Miss India Namrata Shirodkar and grand-daughter of Meenakshi Shirodkar. She married United Kingdom-based banker Aparesh Ranjit in 2000. They have a daughter together.

== Filmography ==
Key
†	Denotes films that have not yet been released

List of Shilpa Shirodkar film credits
Year	Film	Role	Notes
1989	Bhrashtachar	Gopi	
1990	Kishen Kanhaiya	Radha	
1990	Ghar Ki Laxmi		
1990	Paap Ki Kamaee	Salma	
1990	Nyay Anyay	Anju Singh	
1991	Yodha	Shilpa Singh	
1991	Trinetra	Mona	
1991	Hum	Anita Sinha	
1991	Benaam Badsha	Bijli	
1991	Do Matwale	Dr. Pooja	
1991	Swarg Yahan Narak Yahan	Radha	
1991	Lakshmanrekha	Vaishali	
1992	Tilak	Daku Mangla / Chanda	
1992	Brahma		Telugu film
1992	Khuda Gawah	Inspector Heena Singh	Nominated:Filmfare Award for Best Supporting Actress
1992	Apradhi	Kamini	
1992	Dil Hi To Hai	Jayshree	
1993	Prateeksha	Renu Khanna	
1993	Pehchaan	Seema	
1993	Jeevan Ki Shatranj	CID Inspector Kiran	
1993	Aankhen	Chandramukhi	
1993	Parwane	Mona Saxena	
1994	Juaari	Anita	
1994	Gopi Kishan	Chanda	
1994	Gopalaa	Sandra Dimento	
1994	Chhoti Bahoo	Radha	
1994	Hum Hain Bemisaal	Didi	
1995	Raghuveer	Roshni	
1995	Bewafa Sanam	Mamta/Sheetal	
1996	Return of Jewel Thief	Sonu	
1996	Apne Dam Par	Sapna Saxena	
1996	Bandish		
1996	Hum Hain Premi		
1996	Rangbaaz	Champa	
1997	Mrityudand	Kanti	
1997	Arasiyal	Vasuki	Tamil film
1998	Hitler	Advocate Sheila S. Sharma	
1998	Dand Nayak	Journalist	
1998	Badmaash	Geeta	
1999	Jai Hind	Roshni	
2000	Gaja Gamini	Sindhu	
2010	Barood : (The Fire) – A Love Story	Sona	Delayed releases
2020	Guns of Banaras	Brijesh Singh's wife	Delayed releases
2025	Jatadhara	Shobha	Telugu-Hindi bilingual film

=== Television ===
List of Shilpa Shirodkar television credits
Year	Film	Role	Notes
1997	Jayate	Pooja M. Desai	Television film
2013–2014	Ek Mutthi Aasmaan	Kamla Vitthal Jadhav	
2016	Silsila Pyaar Ka	Janaki Randhir Tiwari	
2017–2018	Savitri Devi College & Hospital	Jaya Sunil Mishra	
2024–2025	Bigg Boss 18	Contestant	7th Place; Evicted Day 102

== Awards and nominations ==
List of Shilpa Shirodkar awards and nominations.
Year	Ceremony	Category	Role	Work	Result	Ref.
1993	38th Filmfare Awards	Filmfare Award for Best Supporting Actress	Inspector Heena Singh	Khuda Gawah	Nominated	
2013	Zee Rishtey Awards	Favourite Naya Sadasya – Female	Kamla	Ek Mutthi Aasmaan	Won	
2013	Zee Rishtey Awards	Favourite Popular Face – Female	Kamla	Ek Mutthi Aasmaan	Nominated	
2013	Zee Rishtey Awards	Favourite Mata-Pita Rishta	Kamla	Ek Mutthi Aasmaan	Nominated	

== See also ==
- List of Indian film actresses
