= Half Marriage (TV series) =

- Genre: Drama, Romance
- Created by: Kavita Barjatya; Kushik Ghatak
- Written by: Kushik Ghatak
- Directed by: Kavita Barjatya
- Starring: Priyanka Purohit; Tarun Mahilani
- Country of origin: India
- Original language: Hindi
- No. of seasons: 1
- No. of episodes: 155

Production
- Producers: Kavita Barjatya; Kushik Ghatak
- Production location: Kanpur
- Cinematography: Sajid Shaikh
- Camera setup: Multi-camera
- Running time: 22 minutes approx
- Production company: Conscious Dreams

Original release
- Network: &TV
- Release: 25 September 2017 – 27 April 2018

Half Marriage is an Indian television show which aired on & TV. It premiered on 25 September 2017 and ended on 27 April 2018. It was produced by Kavita Barjatya and Kushik Ghatak of Conscious Dreams. It starred Priyanka Purohit and Tarun Mahilani.

== Plot ==
The show begins with the portrayal of the life of Chandni Kanaujia, the only daughter of Vanraj Kanaujia, a political leader of the Sanskar Sena. Chandni, an innocent and pampered young lady, lives her life in her own terms and is unaware of the reality. On the other hand, we get introduced to Arjun Sharma a hard-working and responsible man. A chance encounter occurs between Chandni and Arjun and they develop a disliking towards each other.

In the meantime, Arjun gets a job in a corporate company. Arjun's company gets involved in a scandal led by no one but Chadni's father. Arjun, being an honest and simple man, makes the news public and it becomes breaking news.

Chandni witnesses everything on the TV and gets heartbroken. However, her evil father deals with the matter calmly and makes Chandni believe that he is innocent. Chandni then decides to seek revenge from Arjun for defaming her father.

Chandni creates for herself a fake life, a fake house, and a fake father and manages to lure Arjun. Chandni fakes to kill herself but is prevented by Arjun who then declares his love for her. Finally, Chandni makes Arjun steal 2 lakh rupees from their office for her. She then gets Arjun arrested and reveals her true identity to him. Arjun begins to hate Chandni from the core of his heart.

Meanwhile, the head of Arjun's company gets rejected by Simmi. He takes the blame upon himself and Simmi and gets them both arrested and Arjun is released.

Arjun makes Simmi admit her and Chandni's treachery and records everything. Vanraj realizes that his political party is at risk and makes Chandni call Arjun and invite him to a park. Arjun reluctantly agrees to come to the park. After their arrival, various members of the Sanskar-sena arrive at the park and drag all the couples to a pavilion to get them married. Arjun is firmly determined to not marry Chandni but sees his younger sister Reva with another guy. He is now forced to either marry Chandni or let his sister get married. He chooses to sacrifice himself to save his sister. Thus, Arjun and Chandni get married.

Then Vanraj fakes his illness and forces Chandni to move to Arjun's house. No one there accepts her but Janki, who is bribed by sahib Ji, wholeheartedly welcomes her. Slowly with time, Arjun and Chandni fall in love with each other. In a trial to take his daughter back, Vanraj ends up burning Sulakshana. This distances Chandni from her in-laws, but Arjun stands by her side.

Reva then falls in love with Surya Prakash but then gets to know about his past affairs and is scattered. She then dies in an accident and Surya Prakash, who tried to save her, is blamed by Arjun's family. Sulakshana decides to throw Chandni out of the house but Arjun leaves with her. They arrive at a hotel, and when they decide to go around the place Chandni shoots Arjun.

2 Years Later

After a 2-year leap, Chandni is shown to be a successful political leader who's supposed to marry Sid her business partner. Arjun returns under the name of Raj Shekhawat, a rich businessman, with his secretary Maya Oberoi who secretly loves him. To make Raj reveal his true identity, Chandni puts his old house at stake. To postpone the breaking of his house, Raj motivates Sid to get engaged to Chandni. Chandni becomes sad to know that Arjun is ready to get her engaged to someone else and agrees to marry Sid. Arjun gets heartbroken and decides to be present during the marriage.

Chandni leaves Sid at the pavilion stating that she cannot marry him. Chandni is put at gunpoint and is forced to marry Sid. Arjun directs the gunpoint towards him and says that he is doing all this just for the benefit of his business. That night, Sampadji calls both Chandni and Arjun and tells them how vanraj had done all this to get rid of Arjun. Arjun and Chandni finally reunite. They also get vanraj and sampadji arrested.

Chandni finally returns home. However, their relationship is not taken into good terms by Arjun's family. Janaki joins hands with Maya to get her married to Arjun and replace Chandni. All the efforts of Maya fail and she is thrown out of the house. She gets Vanraj released and takes him to her side. Vanraj is a changed man who repents for his wrongdoings towards his daughter who loved him so dearly. He decides to become a pawn in Maya's hand to expose her. In the end, Maya is exposed to the press by Vanraj and is thrown out of Chandni and Arjun's lives. Arjun and Chandni finally consummate their marriage.

Later Chandni gives birth to a baby girl. The whole family gathers for a family photograph in the ending scene and the show ends with a happy note.

== Cast ==
=== Main ===
- Priyanka Purohit as Chandni Kanojia
- Tarun Mahilani as Arjun Sharma

=== Recurring ===
- Satyajit Sharma as Vanraj Kanojia: Chandni's father
- Avdeep Sidhu as Surya Prakash Kanojia: Chandni's brother
- Kanupriya Shankar Pandit as Sulakshana Sharma: Arjun and Reva's mother
- Akshita Mudgal as Reva Sharma: Arjun's sister
- Arjun Singh Shekhawat as Mannu Chaurasiya: Arjun's best friend
- Neha Chowdhury as Simmi: Chandni's Best Friend
- Karan Thakur as Shakti: Arjun's brother-in-law
- Resham Tipnis as Janaki: Arjun's aunt
- Vindhya Tiwari as Maya Oberoi: Arjun's secretary and obsessive lover
- Paaras Madaan as Sidharth Singhania
- Shafeeq Ansari as Sampath: Vanraj's friend and assistant
- Sahiba Vij as Shakti's Wife
- Ahmad Harhash as Yash Sharma: Arjun's brother
