= Priyanka Purohit =

Indian television actress

- Born: Priyanka Purohit; 7 October 1991 (age 34); Mumbai, Maharashtra, India
- Occupation: Actress
- Years active: 2014—present
- Known for: Splitsvilla 7 Krishnadasi

Priyanka Purohit (born 7 October 1991) is an Indian television actress known for participating in Splitsvilla 7, portraying Poorva Deshmukh in Krishnadasi and Jiya Kapoor in Mangal Lakshmi.

== Career ==
Purohit started off her career in 2014 by participating in MTV India's dating reality show Splitsvilla 7. The same year, she made her acting debut as Gauri in Sony Pal's Yeh Dil Sun Raha Hai. In 2015, she played Pinky in Zee TV's Bandhan and Pallavi in Life OK's Kalash. The following year, Purohit portrayed Poorva Deshmukh in Colors TV's Krishnadasi opposite Shravan Reddy.

In 2017, she starred in Zee TV's Sanyukt as Hetal Shah opposite Suraj Kakkar. From 2017 to 2018, she portrayed Chandni Kanojia in &TV's social drama Half Marriage opposite Tarun Mahilani. From 2018 to 2019, Purohit portrayed Bhumi in Zee TV's Aap Ke Aa Jane Se opposite Karan Jotwani. From 2019 to 2020, she played Tara Kohli in SAB TV's Tera Kya Hoga Alia opposite Harshad Arora.

In 2021, she starred as Vaidehi in Voot's mystery thriller Sumer Singh Case Files: Girlfriends co-starring Rannvijay Singha and Ayaz Ahmed. After a break, Purohit returned as Jiya in Mangal Lakshmi.

== Filmography ==
=== Television ===
Year	Show	Role	Ref(s)
2014	Splitsvilla 7	Contestant	
2014–2015	Yeh Dil Sun Raha Hai	Gauri	
2015	Bandhan	Pinky Patil	
2015	Kalash	Pallavi Deol	
2016	Krishnadasi	Poorva Deshmukh	
2017	Sanyukt	Hetal Shah	
2017–2018	Half Marriage	Chandni Kanojia	
2018–2019	Aap Ke Aa Jane Se	Bhumi	
2019–2020	Tera Kya Hoga Alia	Tara Kohli	
2024–2026	Mangal Lakshmi	Jiya Kapoor	

=== Web ===
Year	Title	Role	Ref
2021	Sumer Singh Case Files: Girlfriends	Vaidehi	

== Awards and nominations ==
Year	Award	Category	Show	Result	Reference
2018	Zee Rishtey Awards	Favourite Naya Sadasya (Female)	Aap Ke Aa Jane Se	Nominated	
