= Haqeeqat (Indian TV series) =

Indian television docudrama series

- Genre: Docudrama
- Written by: Subodh Chopra; Sushma Bakshi
- Directed by: ndraneel Goswami; Lateef Binny; Saurabh Narang
- Presented by: Mahesh Bhatt
- Country of origin: India
- Original language: Hindi

Production
- Producer: Anuradha Prasad
- Camera setup: Multi-camera
- Running time: Approx. 35 minutes
- Production company: BAG Films

Original release
- Network: Sahara One
- Release: 12 June 2001

Haqeeqat (transl. Reality) is an Indian television docudrama series that aired on Sahara One based on the human rights violation either by the Indian Police Service or common man against the common man.

== Concept ==
Each story is presented by director-producer Mahesh Bhatt, and showcases true stories of atrocities on common man ranging from child abuse and labor, custodial torture, death, rape, dowry deaths, immoral traffic, domestic violence and inhuman atrocities.

== Awards ==
=== Radio and TV Advertisers Practitioners Association (RAPA) Awards ===
- 27th RAPA Awards 2001: 'Best Direction'
- 28th RAPA Awards 2002
  - Saurabh Narang: 'Best Director'
  - Haqeeqat: 'Best Nonfiction Programme'

=== Indian Telly Awards ===
- Indian Telly Awards 2002: Saurabh Narang, 'Best Director' & 'Best Screenplay Writer'

=== Indian Television Academy Awards ===
- Hero Honda ITA Awards 2004: Geeta Nair, 'Best Actress'

=== Asian Television Awards ===
- 2002 Asian Television Awards: Haqeeqat: Long Format Docudrama

== See also ==
- 7 RCR (TV Series)
- Samvidhaan (TV Series)
- Satyamev Jayate (TV series)
- Pradhanmantri (TV Series)
- Television shows based on Indian history
