= Chhavi Pandey =

Indian television actress (born 1986)

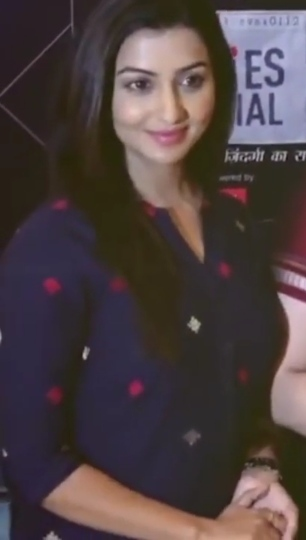
- Pandey in 2018
- Born: 18 July 1986 (age 40); Patna, Bihar, India
- Occupations: Actress singer
- Years active: 2008–present

Chhavi Pandey is an Indian television actress known for playing Tara in Life OK's Ek Boond Ishq, Namrata Singh in Star Bharat's mystery thriller Kaal Bhairav Rahasya and Prarthana Kashyap in Sony TV's Ladies Special 2 and Uttara/Maya in Anupamaa.

== Career ==
Pandey has learnt Kathak (Indian classic dance) and is a professional singer as well. She has learned classical music and light music and is a national scholar from ministry of culture New Delhi in classical music.

Pandey first appeared in India's Got Talent Season 1 on Colors TV in 2008 and finished as a semi-finalist. She then did a Bhojpuri movie Bidesia opposite Dinesh Lal Yadav. Pandey was in 2011 considered to play the role of Aliya in Star Plus show Sajda Tere Pyaar Mein which was later played by Deblina Chatterjee. In January 2012 she was in the Star Plus show Sang Mere Dol Tu, a pilot of the show was made but the show was scrapped by the end of 2012. Pandey in August 2012 signed in Star Plus show Daag, later named Ek Hasina Thi, opposite actor Vatsal Seth, but due to some problems she later left the show and was replaced by Sanjeeda Sheikh.

In September 2013, Pandey appeared in the Life OK show Ek Boond Ishq opposite actor Viraf Patel. Pandey played Smita in Teri Meri Love Stories on Star Plus. In 2015, she portrayed the lead role of Darpan Karnik in serial Bandhan – Saari Umar Humein Sang Rehna Hai.

Later in 2016 she appeared in the show Silsila Pyaar Ka on Star Plus. From 2017 to 2018 she appeared on suspense thriller Kaal Bhairav Rahasya that aired on Star Bharat as Namrata Singh, the main female antagonist in the serial. In late 2018, she was offered the role of Maharani Padmini in Vikram Betaal Ki Rahasya Gatha, but she later refused the role. From 2018 to 2019 she played the lead role of Prarthana Kashyap in Ladies Special. From January 2023 to July 2023, she played the role of Uttara alias Maya in Anupamaa. She is currently playing the role of Poornima in Dangal's serial Poornima.

== Television ==
Year	Serial	Role
2008	India's Got Talent 1	Contestant
2012	Teri Meri Love Stories	Dr. Smita Kumari Bansal
2013–2014	Ek Boond Ishq	Tara Singh Shekhawat
2014	Yeh Hai Aashiqui	Drishti
2015	Bandhan – Saari Umar Humein Sang Rehna Hai	Darpan Karnik/Riya Khare
2016	Silsila Pyaar Ka	Kajal Saxena
2017	Shaurya Veer Eklavya Ki Gatha	Sanatri
2017–2018	Kaal Bhairav Rahasya	Namrata Singh
2018–2019	Ladies Special	Prarthana Kashyap
2019–2020	Apna News Aayega	Chulbuli Pandey
2019	Namah Lakshmi Narayan	Devi Parvati
2020	Tera Kya Hoga Alia	Tara Kohli
2020–2021	Prem Bandhan	Janaki Srivastav Shastri / Jaya Kapoor
2021–2022	Shubh Laabh – Aapkey Ghar Mein	Devi Lakshmi
2021–2022	Shubh Laabh – Aapkey Ghar Mein	Divya
2022	Shubh Laabh – Aapkey Ghar Mein	Devi Alakshmi
2023	Anupamaa	Uttara/Maya
2023–2024	Poornimaa	Poornimaa Siddharth Singh
2025	Bas Itna Sa Khwaab	Tamanna
2026	Hui Gumm Yaadein Ek Doctor, Do Zindagiyaan	Dr. Preeti Deshmukh
