= Mangal Singh =

Punjabi politician and legislator

Sardar Mangal Singh
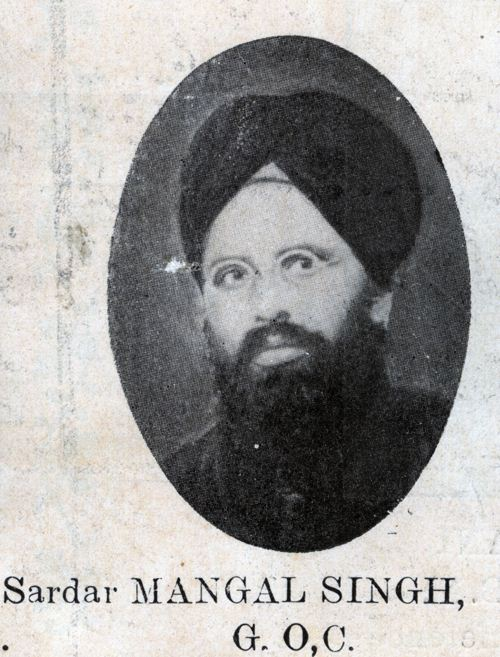

President of Shiromani Gurdwara Prabandhak Committee
- In office 27 April 1925 – 2 October 1926
- Preceded by: Mehtab Singh
- Succeeded by: Baba Kharak Singh

Member of Central Legislative Assembly
- In office 1935 - 1946
- Preceded by: Harbans Singh
- Succeeded by: Post Abolished
- Constituency: East Punjab (Sikh)

Personal details
- Born: 6 June 1892; Gill village, Ludhiana, British India
- Died: 16 June 1987; Chandigarh
- Political party: Indian National Congress (till 1945); Shiromani Akali Dal (1945-1960)

Mangal Singh (1892–1987) was a Punjabi politician and legislator, member of Central Legislative Assembly and also served as President of SGPC.

== Early life ==
Mangal Singh was born into the family of zaildar. His father Kapur Singh was a zaildar. Mangal Singh passed his matriculation in 1911 and then joined the Khalsa College, Amritsar for further study. After World War I broke out in 1914 he left the college and joined the military and posted at Mesopotamia.

After he returned to country, he vehemently opposed the policies of British Government, for this he was arrested many times.

== Later life ==
Mangal Singh actively participated in Gurdwara Reform Movement. He was the member of ad hoc committee who negotiated with Britishers which ultimately led to the passing of Sikh Gurdwaras Act, 1925. He served as president of SGPC from 1925 to 1926

He represented the Sikhs in the Motilal Nehru Committee which drew up a draft constitution of India commonly known as Nehru Report.

He elected to Central Legislative Assembly in 1935 on nominee of Indian National Congress and then again in 1945 on the nominee of Shiromani Akali Dal.

Mangal Singh withdraw from the active politics in 1960 due to health problems. He died in Chandigarh on 16 June 1987.
