= Chakravartin Ashoka Samrat =

2015 Indian historical drama serial

- Genre: Historical Fiction; Drama
- Created by: Abhimanyu Singh
- Written by: Ashok Banker
- Directed by: Prasad Gavandi
- Creative directors: Jitendra Srivastava, Nafees Khan
- Starring: See below
- Opening theme: Ashoka Hai, Ashoka Tha
- Country of origin: India
- Original language: Hindi
- No. of seasons: 1
- No. of episodes: 442

Production
- Producers: Abhimanyu Singh; Rupali Singh
- Production locations: Karjat, Raigad district, Maharashtra, India
- Cinematography: Deepak Pandey
- Running time: approx. 20 minutes
- Production company: Contiloe Entertainment

Original release
- Network: Colors TV
- Release: 2 February 2015 – 7 October 2016

Chakravartin Ashoka Samrat (transl. The Great Emperor Ashoka) is a 2015 Indian historical drama TV series that aired on Colors TV from 2 February 2015 to 7 October 2016. with Siddharth Nigam portraying the young version of the character.

Series is based on the life of Ashoka the third emperor of the Mauryan dynasty. The series tells the story of how he faced the problems outside and inside Magadha, eventually rising to become its ruler. The show premiered on 2 February 2015 with a 1-hour telecast duration for the first 20 episodes. The serial ended on 7 October 2016. It was awarded and named as the best Historical drama ever made.

== Plot ==
This series starts when Magadha is ruled by Emperor Bindusara Maurya , the Second King of Mauryan dynasty . His Father Chandragupta Maurya was the First king of India and always dreamt about 'Akhand Bharat' to rule over India with his Advisor Chanakya who now his Bindusara's Guide. Bindusara's step-mother, Helena conspires against him. Bindusara is attacked but is saved by a Brahmin woman in Champa named Dharma. Bindusara is amazed at her and marries her. Dharma then conceives a child. She refuses to visit royal palace with Bindusara, who promised her to return. Bindusara's third queen, Noor and her father, Mir Khorasan, seek to assassinate Dharma. Mir attacks Dharma and kills her father. He then sets her hut on fire. Bindusara assumes Dharma to be dead, but Dharma survives and gives birth to a son, Ashoka.

=== 14 years later ===
Ashoka is now grown into a brave boy and lives with Dharma in a hamlet. Chanakya spots Ashoka and finds his truth, but promises Dharma to keep it a secret. Chanakya and his disciple, Radhagupta take them to Pataliputra disguising Dharma as a royal physician. Chanakya now vows to guide Ashok after Bindusara and Chandragupta. Ashoka impresses Bindusara and they develop a bond, irritating Bindusara's eldest son, Sushim, his mother Charumitra, Mir Khorasan, Helena and her son, Justin. It is revealed that Justin and Noor have been having an affair for years and Siyamak is their child. Helena fixes Justin's marriage with Aghnishika the princess of Ujjain and Shushim falls in love with her sister Ahenkara. Later it revealed that it was pre planned by Helena and her father Seleucus to kill the Mauryan family. Ashok saves Bindusara from the fire and Ahenkara's father is executed . Justin is killed by Helena for betrayal after he claims responsibility for Helena's crimes. Eventually, Ashoka finds about his father and reunites Bindusara and Dharma. Helena came to know about Siyamak and accepts him to make him the Emperor of Maghdha. Shushim's marriage gets fixed with Ahnekara but due to their family rivalry he starts torturing her. Ashoka saves Ahenkara and her brother from Sushim being Angradhoodht but it creates a rift between Bindusara and Ashoka .Noor tries to overthrow Bindusara but is killed by Ashoka. Chanakya is trapped and set in fire by Helena, Khallatak, Charumitra, Sushim and Siamak. Ashoka saves him from fire and Chanakya dies asking Ashoka to become the Emperor and realise his dream of Akhanda Bharat. Ashoka is shattered and vows to catch the murderers.

Later, Ashoka succeeds in saving Taxila from Kichak. He falls in love with Kaurvaki, the princess of Kalinga. Mir Khorasan and Helena's father, Emperor Seleucus conspire to overthrow Bindusara but fail and are killed. While both are in prison, Helena reveals Ashoka about the murder of Chanakya and fakes a suicide. Ashoka is enraged and attempts to kill Sushim for which he is banished by Bindusara. Dharma and her newborn son Vitashoka (Vit) accompany him to Ujjain and Ashoka vows to come back stronger and avenge Chanakya's death and to Fufil his Grandfather's Dream about 'Akhand Bharat'.

=== 10 years later ===
Ashoka, now known as Chand, has become a ruthless, angry man who just wants revenge. He lives with Dharma and Vit in the house of a merchant named Dhaniram. Dhaniram's daughter, Devi cares about them. Sushima has become stronger with the help of the black magic of Charumitra. Siamak has grown into a cool-headed man but thirsts for the death of Ashoka. Ashoka takes part in a wrestling contest with Sushim as Chand. Dharma and Vit come there and stop Ashoka. Bindusara recognises them, forgives Ashoka, and asks him to come back to Pataliputra.

Ashoka exposes Helena, who is still alive as Kondana. Siamak is tricked and he kills Helena. Ashoka and Sushim are supposed to marry Kaurvaki and Chanda. Kaurvaki's father, Jagannath insults Bindusara and Dharma and asks the throne of Magadha. Ashoka is enraged and marries Devi, calling off his marriage with Kaurvaki. Dharma is killed by Sushim and Bindusara also dies due a cardiac arrest caused by Charumitra's blackmagic, leaving Ashoka broken. He suspects Siamak to be Dharma's murderer and kills him. Sushim stabs Charumitra to death, mistaking her to be Kaurvaki. After his insult ,

Khallatak teams up with Ashok. Sushim confesses his crimes. After a fierce war, Sushim falls into a lava pit and dies. Later Chanda Curses Ashok as she was Pregnant. Ashoka is crowned as the third emperor of Magadha. Devi was about to leave but stays learning that she is pregnant. Devi Informs Ashok about her pregnancy and stays with kaurvaki.

Months later, Devi gives birth to their son, Mahindra and later their daughter, Sanghamitta. Ashoka captures Kalinga and draws a massive amount of bloodshed, killing millions of people. An injured Kaurvaki tells ashok that this is not the Akhand Bharat that Chanakya and Chandragupta wanted. This incident leaves him traumatised at the waste of human lives. He later on, decides to give up violence and embraces Buddhism. With the help of his children and ministers, he propagates the principles of Buddhism around the world for the welfare of mankind and earns the title of "Ashoka the Great", also fulfilling Chanakya's dream of Akhand Bharat (Greater India).

== Cast ==
=== Main ===
- Mohit Raina as Ashoka: Third Empreror of Magadha; Dharma and Bindusara's son; Chandragupta's and Dhurdhara's Grandson; Vitashoka's brother; Devi and Kaurvaki's husband; Mahindra and Sanghamitta's father (2016)
  - Siddharth Nigam as Teenage Ashoka (2015–2016)
- Kajol Srivastav as Maharani Devi Maurya: Crown Princess of Magadha; Empress consort of Magadha; Dhaniram's daughter; Ashoka's wife; Mahindra and Sanghamitta's mother (2016)
- Soumya Seth as Karuvaki: Crown Princess of Magadha; Empress consort of Magadha; Princess of Kalinga; Vasudha and Jagannath's daughter; Ashoka's wife; Mahindra and Sanghamitta's step-mother (2016)
  - Reem Shaikh as Teenage Kaurvaki (2015-2016)
- Pallavi Subhash as Rani Shubhadrangi "Dharma" Maurya: Former empress consort of Magadha; Bindusara's beloved and second wife; Ashoka and Vitashoka's mother (2015–2016)
- Sameer Dharmadhikari as Bindusara: Former and second emperor of Magadha; Durdhara and Chandragupta's son; Charumitra, Dharma, Noor and Subrasi's husband; Sushima, Ashoka, Dhrupada and Vitashoka's father (2015–2016)
- Manoj Joshi as Chanakya: Chandragupta, Bindusara and Ashoka's teacher and royal advisor; Radhagupta's teacher (2015)
- Suzanne Bernert as Helena Maurya: former Empress consort of Magadha (née Princess of Greece); Seleucus's daughter; Chandragupta's second wife; Justin's mother, Bindusara's step-mother; Siamak's grandmother; Sushima, Ashoka, Vitashoka and Dhrupada's step-grandmother; Mahindra and Sanghamitta's step-great-gradmother (2015-2016)
- Ankit Arora as Yuvraj Sushim Maurya: Former and eldest crown prince of Magadha; Charumitra and Bindusara's son; Chandragupta's and Dhurdhara's eldest grandson; Ashoka's, Vitashoka's , Dhrupadh's Elder Half Brother; Ahenkara's former fiancee; Chanda's husband (2016)
  - Sumedh Mudgalkar as Teenage Sushim (2015-2016)

=== Recurring ===
- Heena Parmar as Chanda Maurya: former Crown Princess of Magadha: Sushima's wife; Bindusara and Charumitra's daughter-in-law (2016)
- Prinal Oberoi as Maharani Charumitra Maurya : former Empress consort of Magadha; Bindusara's first wife; Chandragupta and Durdhara's daughter-in-law; Sushima's mother; Ashoka, Vitashoka and Dhrupada's step-mother; Siamak's foster mother and aunt; Chanda's mother-in-law; Mahindra and Sanghamitta's step-grandmother(2015-2016)
- Ankita Sharma as Rani Noor Khoorasan Maurya: former Empress consort of Magadha (née Khorasan); Khorason's daughter; Bindusara's third wife; Justin's secret lover; Chandragupta and Durdhara's daughter-in-law; Sushima, Ashoka, Vitashoka and Dhrupada's step-mother; Siamak's mother; Mahindra and Sanghamitta's's step-gradmother (2015)
- Preet Kaur Madhan as Rani Subrasi Maurya: former Empress consort of Magadha; Bindusara's fourth wife; Chandragupta and Durdhara's daughter-in-law; Dhrupada's mother; Sushima, Ashoka, Vitashoka's step-mother; Siamak's foster mother and aunt; Mahindra and Sanghamitta's step-grandmother (2015-2016)
- Arhaan Behll as Chandragupta Maurya: former and first Emperor of Magadha; First king of India; Durdhara and Helena's husband; Seleucus's son-in-law; Bindusara and Justin's father; Charumitra, Dharma, Noor and Subrasi's father-in-law; Sushima, Ashoka, Vitashoka, Dhrupada and Siamak's grandfather; Mahindra and Sanghamitta's great-grandfather (2015)
- Dev Singhal as Prince Vitashoka Maurya aka Vita: Prince of Magadha: Bindusara and Dharma's son; Charumitra, Noor and Subrasi's step-son; Ashoka's brother; Sushima and Dhrupada's half-brother; Siamak's foster-brother and cousin; Justin's nephew; Mahindra and Sanghamitta's uncle; Chandragupta and Durdhara's grandson; Helena's step-grandson (2016)
- Ayaan Zubair Rahmani as Prince Dhrupada Maurya: Prince of Maurya; Bindusara and Subrasi's son; Charumitra, Dharma and Noor's step-son; Sushima, Ashoka and Vitashoka's half-brother; Siamak's foster-brother and cousin; Justin's nephew; Mahindra and Sanghamitta's uncle; Chandragupta and Durdhara's grandson; Helena's step-grandson (2015-2016)
- Sumit Kaul as Prince Justin Maurya: Prince of Magadha; Chandragupta and Helena's son; Durdhara's step-son; Bindusara's half-brother; Sushima, Ashoka and Vitashoka's uncle; Noor's secret lover; Aghnishika's ex-fiancee; Siamak's father(2015)
  - Dev Singhal as Teenage Prince Justin of Magadha (2015)
- Abhiram Nain as Prince Siamak Maurya: Prince of Magadha; Justin and Noor's son; Bindusara, Charumitra, Dharma and Subrasi's foster-son and nephew; Sushima, Ashoka, Vitashoka and Dhrupada's foster-brother and cousin; Mahindra and Sanghamitta's uncle; Chandragupta and Helena's grandson; Durdhara's step-grandson(2016)
  - MD Faizan Khan as Child Prince Siamak Maurya of Magadha (2015-2016)
- Tunisha Sharma as Princess Ahenkara: Princess of Ujjain; Rajadiraj and Niharika's daughter; Shaktiraj's niece; Aghnishika's cousin; Sushima's former love interest and ex-fiancée; Ashoka's friend (2015)
- Jitendra Bohra as Acharya Radhagupta: Prime Minister of Magadha; Chanakya's disciple; Ashoka's teacher (2015-2016)
  - Dakssh Ajit Singh replaced Jitendra Bohra as Acharya Radhagupta (2016)
- Manoj Kolhatkar as Mahamatya Khallataka: former Prime Minister of Magadha; Sushima's supporter and Ashoka's helper (2015-2016)
- Jaswant Menaria as Nayak: Taxilla's former commander; Ashoka's supporter (2016)
- Vikrant Chaturvedi as Mir Khorason: Magadha's former commander; Noor's father; Bindusara's father-in-law; Siamak's grandfather (2015-2016)
- Tej Sapru as Seleucus I Nicator: King of Greece; Helena's father; Chandragupta's father-in-law; Justin's grandfather; Siamak's great-grandfather (2015-2016)
- Manoj Verma as King Jagannath: King of Kalinga; Vasudha's husband; Kaurvaki's father; Ashoka's father-in-law (2016)
- Alefia Kapadia as Queen Vasudha: Queen consort of Kalinga; Jagannath's wife; Kaurvaki's mother; Ashoka's mother-in-law (2016)
- Sachin Verma as Acharya Akramaka: Ashoka's guru in Royal Academy (2015)
- Rajesh Khera as Acharya Devratha: Ashoka's guru in Taxila (2015-2016)
- Yashashri Masurkar as Princess Agnishika: Princess of Ujjain; Shaktiraj's daughter; Rajadiraj's niece; Ahenkara's cousin; Justin's ex-fiancée (2015)
- Yogesh Mahajan as King Rajadiraj: King of Ujjain: Shaktiraj's brother; Aghnishika's uncle; Niharika's husband; Ahenkara's father (2015)
- Tapasya Nayak Srivastava as Queen Niharika: Queen consort of Ujjain: Rajadiraj's wife; Ahenkara's mother (2015)
- Shailesh Dattar as Amatya Ugrasain: Justin and Helena's spy (2015) (Dead)
- Sudhanshu Pandey as King Keechaka: former King of Taxila; Vasantsena's brother; Bahamani's husband (2015-2016)
- Monica Sehgal as Queen Bahamani: former Queen consort of Taxila; Keechaka's wife; Vasantsena's sister-in-law (2015-2016)
- Amit Behl as Amatya Rakshas: Helena and Keechak's helper. (2015–2016)
- Sonal Parihar as Nirjhara: Chanakya's spy (2015)
- Praveen Kaur as Kasturi: Chanakya's spy and Dharma's helper. (2015–2016)
- Rumi Khan as Daastan: Noor's ex-lover (2015)
- Harsh Khurana as Uttara: Kondana's right hand (2016)
- Anand Goradia as Agnibahu: Prime Minister of Taxila (2015–2016)
- Mayank Gandhi as Virat: Ashoka's protector. (2016)

== Production and promotion ==
The set was erected in Karjat. The show was produced by Contiloe Entertainment. A team of at least 500 people worked on the series. Episodes were shot across Jaisalmer, Kerala, Mumbai's Film City and Karjat. A lightman died on the set in April 2015.

Chakravartin Ashoka Samrat was promoted on the comedy show Comedy Nights with Kapil on the occasion of Maha Shivaratri in February 2015 A game app "Ashoka:The Game" was launched by Colors TV in April 2015.

== Awards ==
Year	Award show	Category	Result
2015	Indian Telly Award	Best Child Actor (Siddhart Nigam)	Won
2015	Indian Telly Award	Best Historical Series	Nominated
2015	Indian Telly Award	Best Actor in a Supporting Role (Drama) (Sameer Dharmadhikari)	Nominated
2015	Indian Telly Award	Best Actress in a Supporting Role (Drama) (Pallavi Subhash)	Nominated
2015	Gold Awards	Best Historical show	Won
2015	Gold Awards	Best Actor (Debut) (Siddhart Nigam)	Won
2015	BIG Star Entertainment Awards	Most Entertaining Television Actor (Female) (Pallavi Subhash Shirke)	Nominated
2015	BIG Star Entertainment Awards	Most Entertaining Television Actor (Male) (Siddhart Nigam)	Nominated
2015	BIG Star Entertainment Awards	Most Entertaining Television Fiction Show	Nominated
2016	Gold Awards	Best Supporting Actor (Male) (Sameer Dharmadhikari)	Nominated
2016	Gold Awards	Best Supporting Actor (Female) (Pallavi Subhash)	Won
2016	Gold Awards	Best Actor in a Negative Role (Female) (Prinal Oberoi)	Nominated
Best Child Actor (Female) (Siddharth Nigam)	Won		

== Critical reception ==
The Times of India praised Ashok Banker's reconstruction filled historical gaps and stated that they provide "interesting fictional turns" for the show.

Bollywood Life reviewer, Letty Mariam Abraham, gave the show 3 out of 5 stars; praising the sets, visual effects and production of the show. She further heaped praise on Siddharth Nigam as "undoubtedly a brilliant actor"; stating that "his agile body makes him the perfect actor for the role." Abraham gave her final comment as "the show looks promising but has a lot of scope for improvement. I'd recommend that people watch this historical drama for Siddharth Nigam and the special effects of the show."

India.com reviewer, Prathamesh Jadhav, stated "going by the opening episode we must confess that this elaborate drama looks rather promising with its interesting tale." He further stated, "What we liked though is the visuals and the diligence that has been put in by the special effects and VFX team. The work is seriously commendable." He gave his final verdict as "going by what we have seen [in] it one must admit that the show looks promising with its actors, its sets and the details that have gone into making a tele-series of this nature."

Additionally it has been known to imitate its style and fictional characters from Game of Thrones.

== International broadcast ==
- In Myanmar, it airs under the title "ဘုန်းမီးနေလ မဟာအသောက" on 5 plus.
- In Cambodia, it airs under the title ព្រះបាទអសោក on Cambodian Television Network.
- In Indonesia, it began airing under the title, Ashoka on 11 May 2015 on antv.
- In Sri Lanka, it airs under the title, Adiraja Dharmashoka on TV Derana from 23 May 2015.
- in Thailand, it airs under the title, อโศกมหาราช on Channel 3 Family
- in Vietnam it airs under the title, Ashoka Đại Đế on THVL1 at 12h00 trưa
- in Ghana under the title Ashoka Samrat on Joy Prime.
- in Kenya on KBC under the title Ashoka at 1830 hours.
- In South Africa, it began airing under the title, Emperor Ashoka in 2021 on glowtv at 19h00CAT.

== See also ==
- Chandragupta Maurya (2011 TV series)
- Chanakya (TV series)
- Bharatvarsh (TV series)
- Chandra Nandini
- Aśoka (film)
