= Pracchand Ashok =

Indian historical television series

- Genre: Historical; Drama
- Created by: Ekta Kapoor; Shobha Kapoor
- Based on: Emperor Ashoka
- Written by: R M Joshi; Neha Singh
- Directed by: Santram Verma
- Creative director: Tanushree Dasgupta
- Starring: See below
- Country of origin: India
- Original language: Hindi
- No. of seasons: 1
- No. of episodes: 39

Production
- Executive producers: Nilesh Mishra; Shailesh Sharma
- Producer: Ekta Kapoor
- Cinematography: Ravi Naidu
- Camera setup: Multi-camera
- Running time: 22 minutes
- Production company: Balaji Telefilms

Original release
- Network: Colors TV
- Release: 6 February – 29 March 2024

Pracchand Ashok is an Indian Hindi-language historical drama television series that had aired from 6 February 2024 to 29 March 2024 on Colors TV and JioCinema. It was produced by Ekta Kapoor and Shobha Kapoor under their banner Balaji Telefilms and is directed by Santram Verma. Starring Adnan Khan as Ashoka Mauryan, Mallika Singh as Karuvaki and Prachi Bohra as Devi, the story-line is loosely based on the life of Ashok.

== Plot ==
The series starts with a voiceover that says, "A lot of kings were born in Bharat and they all had their truths open but one story had so many facets that the real truth remained hidden. It is a story about a brave king, the king who was king of all kings, the most courageous king, the bravest soldier, the king who brought light in this world. But the light in his world was brought by a princess, named Karuvaki". Their story had started when king Bindusar Mauryan's third wife, Dharma gave birth to the bravest king, but it was not an easy birth. His birth night was dark and had many secrets buried during that night. The painful story of emperor Ashoka Mauryan had started from that very night. The series also explores the life of Ashok, and his love story with Devi and Karuvaki.

== Cast ==
=== Main ===
- Adnan Khan as King Ashoka Mauryan: Emperor of Magadha; Bindusara and Dharma's son; Sushim's half-brother; Anandi's brother; Chanakya's student; Devi and Kaurvaki's husband (2024)
  - Swarit Bhanushali as Child Ashok Maurya
- Mallika Singh as Queen Karuvaki Mauryan: Second empress of Magadha; Jagannath and Salukhawati's daughter; Mudit's sister; Devi's best friend; Ashok's second wife (2024)
- Prachi Bohra as Queen Devi Mauryan: First empress of Magadha; Kaurvaki's best friend; Ashok's first wife (2024)

=== Recurring ===
- Rakshanda Khan as Queen mother Helena Mauryan: Former empress of Magadha; Bindusara's mother; Ashoka, Anandi and Sushim's grandmother (2024)
- Chetan Hansraj as King Bindusar Mauryan: Emperor of Magadha; Helena's son; Dharma, Diana and Vimala's husband; Ashoka, Anandi and Sushim's father (2024)
- Manoj Kolhatkar as Acharya Chanakya (2024)
- Shalini Chandran as Queen mother Shubhadrangi "Dharma" Mauryan: Third empress of Magadha; Priest's daughter; Bindusara's third wife; Ashoka and Anandi's mother; Sushim's step-mother (2024)
- Vivana Singh as Diana Mauryan: First empress of Magadha; Bindusar's first wife; Sushim's mother (2024)
- Aarush Srivastav as Prince Sushim Mauryan: Bindusara and Diana's son; Dharma's step-son; Ashoka and Anandi's estranged half-brother; Roopa's estranged husband (2024)
- Darshana Khandelwal Makhija as Queen Vimala Mauryan: Second empress of Magadha; Bindusar's second wife (2024)
- Dinesh Mehta as Subandhu (2024)
- Manish Khanna as King Chaitraj: King of Vidisha (2024)
- Harsh Vashisht as Sarvadaman: Mahamantri of Kalinga; Jagannath's younger brother; Revati's husband; Bhadrak's father; Kaurwaki and Mudit's paternal uncle (2024)
- Ankit Bhatia as Bhadrak (2024)
- Tanvi Sawant as Princess Anandi Mauryan: Bindusar and Dharma's daughter; Ashok's sister; Sushim's estranged half-sister; Pawan's love interest (2024)
- Unknown as Prince Mudit: Jagannath and Salukhavati's son; Kaurwaki's younger brother; Bhadrak's younger cousin; Sarvadaman and Revati's nephew (2024)
- Unknown as Revati: Sarvadaman's wife; Bhadrak's mother; Kaurwaki and Mudit's aunt (2024)
- Kapil Dahiya as Prince Lakshman: Bindusar's son (2024)
- Saurabh Kaushik as Prince Padmak: Bindusar's son (2024)
- Priya Thakur as Princess Roopa Mauryan: A former servant turned princess of Magadha; Sushim's estranged widow (2024)
- Aman Gandotra as Pawan: Ashok's best friend; Anandi's love interest (2024)
- Ajay Kumar Singh as King Jagannath: King of Kalinga; Salukhavati's widower; Kaurwaki and Mudit's father; Sarvadaman's elder brother (2024)
- Surendrapal Singh as King Chandragupta Maurya (2024)
- Leena Balodi as Queen Salukhavati: Jagannath's wife; Kaurwaki and Mudit's mother (2024)
- Prarthana Mondal as Uma: A servant; Bhadrak's love interest (2024)
- Maera Mishra as Vishkanya (2024)
