= Chandragupta Maurya (2011 TV series) =

2011 Indian television series

- Genre: Historical drama
- Created by: Prem Sagar
- Written by: Sumit Roy; Faizal Akhtar; Brij Mohan Vyas; Abhishek Kumar
- Directed by: Bhushan Patel; Arif Shamsi; K.K.Chauhan; Arif Ali Ansari; Vaibhav Mutha
- Starring: See below
- Country of origin: India
- Original language: Hindi
- No. of seasons: 1
- No. of episodes: 105

Production
- Producers: Nilanjana Purkayasstha Sagar; Prem Sagar; Jyoti Sagar; Shiv Sagar
- Cinematography: Ravi Naidu
- Editors: Shums Mirza; Satya Sharma
- Production company: Sagar Films

Original release
- Network: Imagine TV
- Release: 7 March 2011 – 7 April 2012

Chandragupta Maurya is an Indian historical drama series based on the life of Chandragupta Maurya, an Indian emperor of ancient India and the founder of the Mauryan Empire. Chandragupta Maurya was first aired in March 2011 on Imagine TV. Ashish Sharma played the adult and Rushiraj Pawar played the young Chandragupta Maurya.

== Summary ==
The story is about Chandragupta Maurya, who ruled over the Indian subcontinent in 300 BC. He would go on to become one of the greatest emperors in ancient India with his empire extending from Assam in the east to Afghanistan and Balochistan in the west.

The story begins with Chanakya, who goes to Dhana Nanda with the offer of Akhand Bharat (literally meaning Undivided India), but Dhana Nanda and his prime minister Amatya Rakshasa end up humiliating him. Chanakya then pledges to not tie a knot in his hair until he succeeded in overthrowing the Nanda dynasty. Whilst travelling to Takshashila, he meets Chandragupta and finding him suitable to achieve his dream of Akhand Bharat, (with the permission of Chandragupta's mother) takes Chandragupta to Takshashila. There they meet Prince Ambhik and his friends (Shashank, Digvijaya and Digamber), who as a group spare no expense in humiliating Chandragupta. This prompts Chandragupta to escape from Takshashila and return home to his village, but Dhana Nanda arrives with his army and destroys the village, killing Chandragupta's mother in front of him. Enraged, Chandragupta vows to destroy The Nanda Empire.
With this in mind, Chandragupta begins training under Chanakya, who then takes him to train under various warriors, who themselves had suffered under the rule of Dhana Nanda. Chandragupta also takes part in a Vijay Yatra, winning it. When Chandragupta turns 13, Chanakya hatches a plan to kill Dhana Nanda and orders Chandragupta to execute it. Chandragupta manages to kill Dhana Nanda, but Prime Minister Rakshasa reveals that the real Dhana Nanda is still alive. It is shown that the Dhana Nanda had seven doppelgangers and Chandragupta had killed one of the doppelgangers. Chandragupta is shattered, but succeeds in escaping from the palace. On hearing of this, an enraged Chanakya decides to further train Chandragupta into an Excellent Warrior.

The show then skips ahead to 8 year in the future, where an adult Chandragupta is being played by Ashish Sharma. Chandragupta is still plotting on overthrowing the Nanda Empire. The show now introduces a new Character Alexander the Great, who is called Sikandar. Prince Ambhik readily joins hands with Sikandar. Together they defeat Porus and their armies enter India. When Chanakya hears about this, he determines that it is time for Chandragupta to rise to his true calling and they set out to gather the forces of India and defend the land from the invaders. They spread the news of the might of the forthcoming Nanda Empire based in the Greek camp, and also poison some of their generals. With the soldiers' deteriorating health and fierce Indian resistance at every step, Alexander is forced to abandon his Indian campaign and returns to Greece. However, his general Eudemus remains in India, joining hands with Ambhik. However, Chandragupta and Chanakya pose them against each other, killing them, therefore ending any Greek influence in India.

== Cast ==
=== Main ===
- Ashish Sharma as Chandragupta Maurya, former Prince of Piplivan, first emperor of the Maurya Empire
  - Rushiraj Pawar as Young Chandragupta Maurya
- Manish Wadhwa as Chanakya, a scholar from Takshashila, Chandragupta's adviser, Prime Minister of the Maurya Empire & also as Chanak, father of Chanakya
- Nidhi Tikoo as Durdhara, princess of Magadh, Chandragupta's wife
- Sooraj Thapar as Dhana Nanda, emperor of Nanda Empire, sworn enemy of Chanakya & also as Mahapadma Nanda first emperor of Nanda Empire, father of Dhana Nanda

=== Recurring ===
- Abhijeet Sooryvanshe as Spy of Rakshas (Tej Sapru)
- Malinee Sengupta as Chitraroopa
- Rajeev Bharadwaj as Bhadrabhatt
- Romanch Mehta as Purushdatt
- Tej Sapru as Rakshas, the Prime Minister of the Nanda Empire and Dhana Nanda's closest associate
- Rohit Purohit as Bhadrasaal, the General of the Nanda Army and ruler of Sahal
- Alihassan Turabi as Virajas
- Mohak Meet as Aditya
- Sumeet Vyas as Ambhik Kumar, Ambhiraj's son and Durdhara's fiancé
- Nitin Prabhat as Ambhik Kumar
- Mohsin Shaikh as Sukant
- Manas Adhiya as Ghanghor
- Rishiraj Arya as Aerawat
- Ravi Patel as Akshay
- Ankit Arora as Chandragupta's father
- Deepti Dhyani as Mura
- Onkar Nath Mishra as Acharya Shreshtha
- Vishal Aditya Singh as Shashank
  - Ankit Shah as Younger Shashank
- Lalit Negi as Digvijay
  - Siddhharth Dhanda as Young Digvijay
- Tiya Gandwani as Mihika
- Tarun Khanna as Karvinath, ruler of Lokhandi
- Rajesh Shringarpure as Seleucus I Nicator, the first Emperor of the Seleucid Empire and Alexander the Great's former general
- Shiraz Hussain as Alexander the Great
- Bhupinder Singh as Porus
- Sunny Hinduja as Callisthenes, a Greek scholar who accompanied Alexander the Great in his quest to conquer the world for documenting his victories and adventures
- Yashashri Masurkar as Mrignayani
- Ankit Kakkar as Aryeman
- Khan Jaan as Dadhich
- Raj Premi as Ahirya
- Ankit Arora as Senapati of Shishunaga Dynasty, friend and trainer of Mahapadma Nanda

== See also ==
- Chandragupta Maurya
- Chandragupta Maurya (2018 TV series)
