= Dhana Nanda =

King of Magadha from 329 to 321 BCE

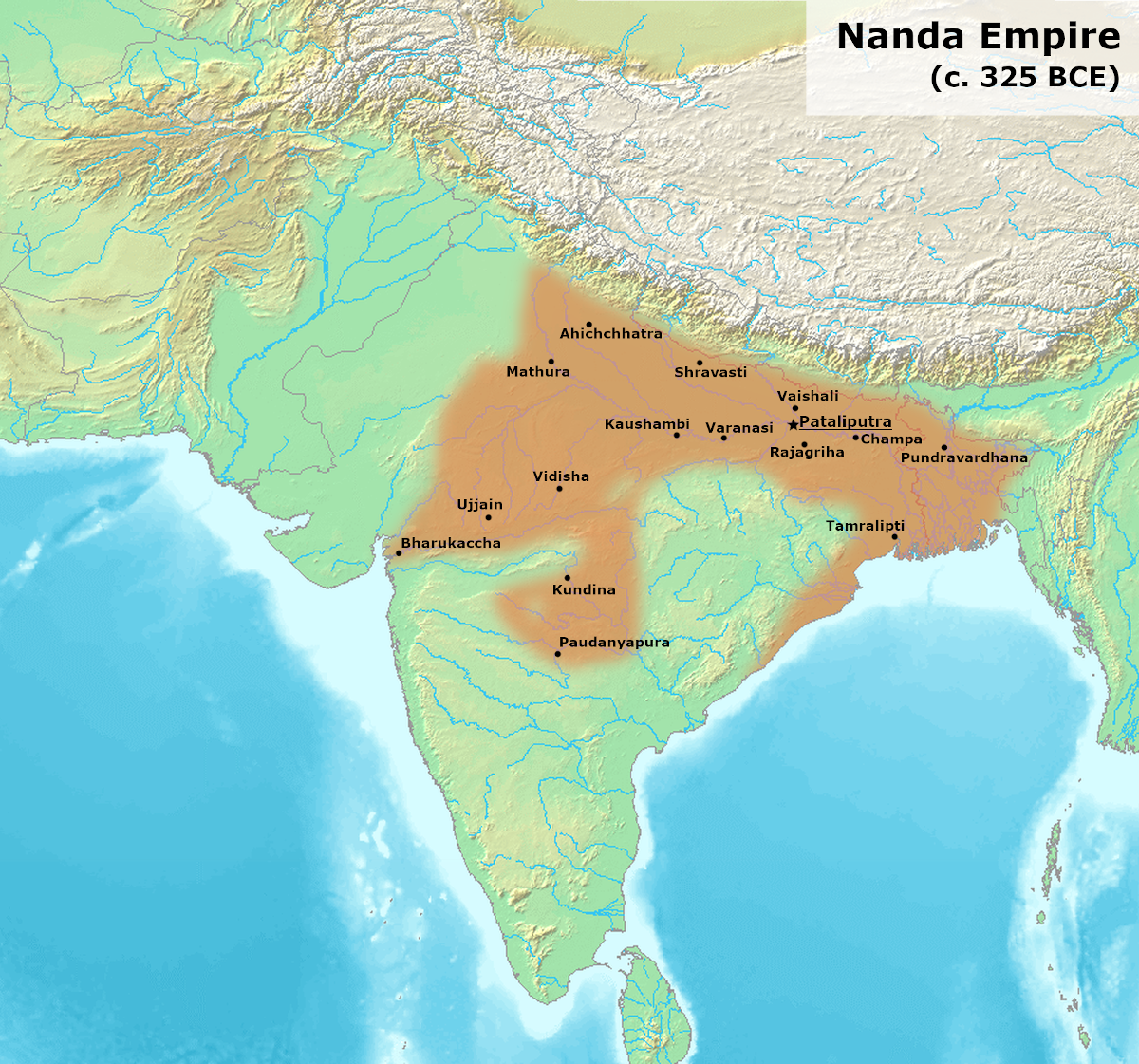
- Dhana Nanda's empire

King of Magadha
- Reign: c. 329–321 BCE
- Predecessor: Kaivarta
- Successor: Chandragupta Maurya (as Emperor of Magadha)
- Died: c. 321 BCE
- Issue: Durdhara
- Dynasty: Nanda
- Father: Mahapadma Nanda

Dhana Nanda (died c. 321 BCE), according to the Buddhist text Mahabodhivamsa, was the last Nanda king of Magadha.

Chandragupta Maurya raised an army that eventually conquered the Nanda capital Pataliputra and defeated him. This defeat marked the fall of the Nanda Empire and the birth of the Maurya Empire.

The Jain tradition presents a similar legend about the last Nanda emperor, although it simply calls the emperor "Nanda", and states that the emperor was allowed to leave his capital alive after being defeated. The Puranas give a different account, describing the last Nanda emperor as one of eight sons of the dynasty's founder, whom they call Mahapadma. The Greco-Roman accounts name Alexander's contemporary ruler in India as Agrammes or Xandrames, whom modern historians identify as the last Nanda emperor. According to these accounts, Alexander's soldiers mutinied when faced with the prospect of a war with this emperor's powerful army.

== Buddhist tradition ==
The Buddhist text Mahāvaṃsa names 9 Nanda kings, who were all brothers, and ruled in succession for a total of 22 years. The first of these kings was Ugrasena, and the last was Dhana Nanda:

1. Ugrasena (Uggasena in Pali)
2. Panduka
3. Pandugati
4. Bhuta-pala
5. Rashtra-pala
6. Govishanaka
7. Dasha-siddhaka
8. Kaivarta
9. Dhana Nanda

The Buddhist tradition states that Dhana Nanda insulted the Chanakya for his ugly appearance during an alms-giving ceremony at Pupphapura (Pushpapura), ordering him to be thrown out of the assembly. Chanakya then cursed the king, who ordered his arrest. Chanakya escaped and befriended the king's son Pabbata, instigating the prince to seize the throne. With help of a signet ring given by the prince, Chanakya fled the Nanda palace. Determined to overthrow Dhana Nanda, he acquired wealth to raise an army by using a secret technique that allowed him to turn 1 coin into 8 coins.

Chanakya narrowed down two candidates to replace Dhana Nanda: Pabbata, and Chandragupta, who belonged to a former royal family. To test them, he gave each of them an amulet to be worn around the neck with a woolen thread. One day, while Chandragupta was asleep, he asked Pabbata to remove Chandragupta's woolen thread without breaking it and without waking up Chandragupta. Pabbata failed to accomplish this task. Some time later, when Pabbata was sleeping, Chanakya challenged Chandragupta to complete the same task. Chandragupta retrieved the woolen thread by cutting off Pabbata's head. Over next seven years, Chanakya trained and mentored Chandragupta. When Chandragupta became an adult, Chanakya assembled an army using his wealth.

The army invaded Dhana Nanda's capital, but was decisively defeated and disbanded. Subsequently, Chandragupta and Chanakya raised a new army, and started capturing the border villages. Gradually, they advanced to the Nanda capital Pataliputta (Pataliputra), and killed Dhana Nanda. Chanakya found the treasure of Dhana Nanda through a fisherman, and appointed Chandragupta as the new king.

== Other descriptions of the last Nanda king ==
=== Jain tradition ===
The Jain tradition contains a legend that has several similarities with the Buddhist legend, but does not mention the name "Dhana Nanda": the Jain texts simply call Chanakya's rival king "Nanda". According to the Jain tradition, Chanakya visited the Nanda capital Pataliputra to seek donations from the king, but felt insulted by a servant of the king. He then vowed to overthrow the Nanda dynasty. He discovered and mentored Chandragupta, and raised an army that defeated the Nanda forces after an initial debacle. However, unlike the Buddhist tradition, the Jain tradition states that the Nanda king was allowed to leave his capital alive after being defeated. The king's daughter fell in love with Chandragupta and married him. This legend does not name this daughter, although later, it names Durdhara as the mother of Chandragupta's son Bindusara.

Nanda's chief minister was Sakadala who had two sons, Sthulabhadra (297–198 BCE) and Srikaya. Srikaya became the king's personal bodyguard. Sthulabhadra loved the royal dancer Rupakosa and lived for 12 years with her. Sakadala was killed in a plot of his political opponent Varichi, after which, his son Srikaya was made the chief minister.

=== Puranas ===
Like the Buddhist tradition, the Puranas also state that there were 9 Nanda kings. However, they name the first of these kings as Mahapadma, and state that the next 8 kings were his sons. The Puranas name only one of these sons: Sukalpa. Dhundhi-raja, an 18th-century Puranic commentator, claims that Chandragupta Maurya was the grandson of a Nanda king called Sarvatha-siddhi, although this claim does not occur in the Puranas themselves.

=== Greco-Roman accounts ===
The Greek accounts name Alexander's contemporary ruler in India as Agrammes or Xandrames, whom modern historians identify as the last Nanda king. "Agrammes" may be a Greek transcription of the Sanskrit word "Augrasainya" (literally "son or descendant of Ugrasena", Ugrasena being the name of the dynasty's founder according to the Buddhist tradition). The Greco-Roman tradition suggests that this dynasty had only two kings: according to Curtius, the dynasty's founder was a barber-turned-king; his son was overthrown by Chandragupta Maurya.

Indian kings Porus and Phegeles (Bhagala) are said to have informed Alexander of the unpopularity of Agrammes among his subjects. According to the Roman historian Quintus Curtius Rufus, his army had as 200,000 infantry, 20,000 cavalry, 2,000 four-horsed chariots and 3,000 elephants. The Greek accounts describe Agrammes as the ruler of the Gangaridai (the Ganges valley) and the Prasii (probably a transcription of the Sanskrit word prachyas, literally "easterners"). When faced with the prospect of facing the powerful army of Nanda, Alexander's soldiers mutinied, forcing him to retreat from India.

All historical accounts agree that the last Nanda king was unpopular among his subjects. According to Diodorus, Porus told Alexander that the contemporary Nanda king was a man of "worthless character", and was not respected by his subjects as he was thought to be of low origin. Curtius also states that according to Porus, the Nanda king was despised by his subjects. According to Plutarch, who claims that Androkottos (identified as Chandragupta) met Alexander, Androkottos later declared that Alexander could have easily conquered the Nanda territory (Gangaridai and Prasii) because the Nanda king was hated and despised by his subjects, as he was wicked and of low origin. The Sri Lankan Buddhist tradition blames the Nandas for being greedy and for imposing oppressive taxation. The Puranas of India label the Nandas as adharmika, indicating that they did not follow the norms of dharma or righteous conduct.

== Popular culture ==
Dhana Nanda appears as the primary antagonist in almost every series on Indian television portraying the life of Chanakya or Chandragupta Maurya.

- In the epic historical drama Chanakya (TV series), Suraj Chaddha portrayed the role of Dhana Nanda.
- In Chandragupta Maurya (2011 TV series), Sooraj Thapar portrayed Dhana Nanda.
- In Chandra Nandini TV Serial, Lokesh Batta portrayed the role of Dhana Nanda.
- In Porus and Chandragupta Maurya, Saurabh Raj Jain essayed the role of Dhana Nanda.
