= Durdhara =

Mauryan Empress (322–320 BCE)

Empress Consort of Mauryan Empire
- Reign: c. 322 BCE – c. 320 BCE
- Predecessor: Position established
- Successor: Mother of Ashoka
- Spouse: Chandragupta Maurya
- Issue: Bindusara
- Father: Dhana Nanda
- Religion: Hinduism; Historical Vedic religion

Durdhara was the empress of Chandragupta Maurya, the founder of the 4th-century BCE Maurya Empire of ancient India, according to the 12th-century CE Jain text Parishishtaparvan by Hemachandra. She is stated by this text to be the mother of the second Mauryan emperor, Bindusara also known as Amitraghāta.

According to the Jain tradition, after Chandragupta defeated the Nanda emperor, the Nanda princess fell in love with Chandragupta and married him. The legend does not name this princess, but later names Durdhara as the mother of Chandragupta's son Bindusara. Nothing is mentioned or known about Durdhara outside of this legend written 1,600 years after Chandragupta's era. Other sources, such as the Burmese Buddhist records do not corroborate the Jain legend. Megasthenes, the Greek ambassador in the final years of Chandragupta's court, does not mention Durdhara nor use the name Bindusara, but refers to Chandragupta's successor as Amitrochates, while the Hindu scholar Patanjali calls him Amitraghata (meaning "vanquisher of foes"). Scholars consider the Bindusara of Jain texts to be the same as Amitraghata.

== In popular culture ==
- Durdhara was portrayed by Nidhi Tikko in Chandragupta Maurya
- Saanvi Talwar played Durdhara in the 2016 historical fiction series Chandra Nandini.
- Pranali Ghogare and Aditi Sanwal portrayed Durdhara in Chandragupta Maurya

== Bibliography ==
- Mookerji, Radha Kumud (1988) [first published in 1966], Chandragupta Maurya and His Times (4th ed.), Motilal Banarsidass, ISBN 81-208-0433-3, OCLC 426322281
- Trautmann, Thomas (1971). Kauṭilya and the Arthaśāstra: a statistical investigation of the authorship and evolution of the text. Brill.
