= Siddharth Nigam =

Indian actor (born 2000)

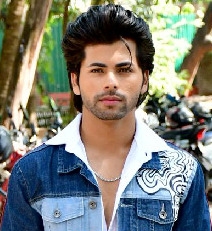
- Nigam in 2023
- Born: 13 October 2000 (age 25); Prayagraj, Uttar Pradesh, India
- Education: Khelgaon Public School, Prayagraj; Thakur College, Mumbai
- Occupation: Actor
- Years active: 2011 — present
- Known for: Dhoom 3 Chakravartin Ashoka Samrat; Jhalak Dikhhla Jaa (season 9); Chandra Nandini; Aladdin – Naam Toh Suna Hoga
- Relatives: Abhishek Nigam (brother)

Siddharth Nigam is an Indian actor who works in Indian television and films. He is known for his roles as young Sahir and Samar in Dhoom 3, young Mauryan prince Ashoka in Chakravartin Ashoka Samrat, Prince Bindusara in StarPlus's Chandra Nandini, and Aladdin in Aladdin – Naam Toh Suna Hoga.

== Personal life ==
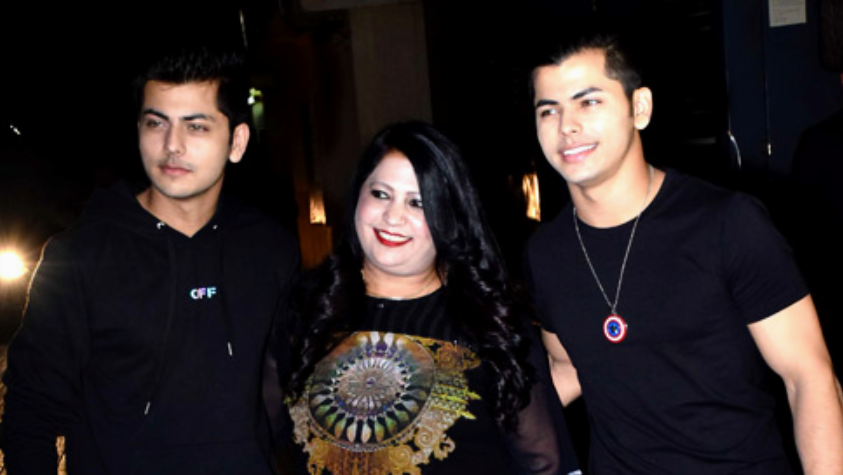
Siddharth Nigam with his family at special screening of Panipat

Nigam was brought up in Prayagraj, Uttar Pradesh. He has an elder brother, Abhishek Nigam, who is also an actor, and their mother runs an NGO and a beauty parlour.

He completed his tenth-class studies at Khelgaon Public School, where he practiced gymnastics. Nigam has won a gold medal in parallel bars and a silver medal in high bar at 58th National School Games, Pune.

Later, he moved to Mumbai from Allahabad. In 2021, Nigam pursued a degree from Thakur College in Kandivali, Mumbai. Nigam also owns two houses in Mumbai.

== Career ==
Nigam started his acting career in 2011 by appearing in a Bournvita advertisement. After watching him in advertisement, the makers of the film Dhoom 3 called him for an audition to play the Young Sahir/Samar. The film was directed by Vijay Krishna Acharya and was released on 20 December 2013. Taran Adarsh of the entertainment portal Bollywood Hungama reviewed, "Siddharth Nigam is a talent to watch out for, he's superb!". Writing for India Today, Suhani Singh said, "He lights up the screen with his self-assured performance and charming presence".

After his successful debut in film, he debuted on television in 2014 with the role of Young Rudra in the mythological drama series Maha Kumbh: Ek Rahasaya, Ek Kahani, which aired on Life OK. In February 2015, Nigam was seen in the historical drama series Chakravartin Ashoka Samrat where he played the lead role of Young Ashoka, and in the same month, he appeared as a guest in a special Mahashivratri episode on Comedy Nights with Kapil.

In 2016, he was seen in Jhalak Dikhhla Jaa 9 as a contestant, and later portrayed Young Shivaji in Peshwa Bajirao. In 2017, he portrayed the character of Bindusara, the son of Emperor Chandragupta Maurya, in Chandra Nandini opposite Avneet Kaur. From 2018 to 2021, he played Aladdin in Sony SAB's Aladdin – Naam Toh Suna Hoga opposite Avneet Kaur and Ashi Singh. In 2021, he was seen as Shivaay in Sony SAB's Hero – Gayab Mode On alongside his brother Abhishek Nigam.

In March 2022, Nigam made his debut as a singer and lyricist with Tum Mili. In April 2023, he appeared in Salman Khan's Kisi Ka Bhai Kisi Ki Jaan. In July 2024, he will be seen in Blue Tick opposite Parul Gulati.

== Other work ==
In August 2022, on the 75th Anniversary of Indian Independence, the Ministry of Culture recognized 75 Cultural Ambassadors, among whom Nigam was selected.

On 31 August 2022, Nigam turned entrepreneur by launching his own activewear brand Ulltor.

== Filmography ==
Key
†	Denotes Films/TV shows that have not yet been released

=== Films ===
Year	Title	Role	Notes	Ref.
2013	Dhoom 3	Young Sahir/Samar	Extended cameo	
2017	Munna Michael	Young Manav "Munna" Roy	Cameo	
2023	Kisi Ka Bhai Kisi Ki Jaan	Love		
2023	Rani Pink	Rishi	Short film	

=== Television ===
Year	Title	Role	Notes	Ref.
2014	Maha Kumbh: Ek Rahasaya, Ek Kahani	Young Rudra		
2015–2016	Chakravartin Ashoka Samrat	Prince Ashoka		
2016	Jhalak Dikhhla Jaa 9	Contestant	4th place	
2016	Comedy Nights Bachao	Child comedian	Episode 55	
2017	Peshwa Bajirao	Young Shivaji		
2017	Chandra Nandini	Crown Prince Bindusara		
2018	Kundali Bhagya	Himself	Episode 308	
2018–2021	Aladdin – Naam Toh Suna Hoga	Aladdin		
2019	Kitchen Champion	Himself	Episode 53	
2019	Ace of Space 2	Himself	Episode 72	
2020	Baalveer Returns	Aladdin		
2020	Kuch Smiles Ho Jayein... with Alia	Himself	Episode 1	
2021	Hero – Gayab Mode On	Shivaay		

=== Web series ===
Year	Title	Role	Notes	Ref.
2024	Blue Tick	Viraj		
2025	Hai Junoon!	Bikram Singh		
2026	Kaptaan	Kabir		

=== Music videos ===
Year	Title	Singer(s)	Notes	Ref.
2018	Tu Naa Aaya	Shyamoli Sanghi		
2019	Zaroori Hai Kya Ishq Mein	Meet Bros, Papon		
2019	Yaari Hai	Tony Kakkar		
2019	Gal Karke	Asees Kaur		
2019	Attachment	Ravneet Singh		
2020	Luck Di Kasam	Ramji Gulati, Mack		
2020	Tu Mera Bhai Hai	Ravish Khanna	Special appearance	
2020	Ringtone	Preetinder, Vicky Sandhu		
2020	Meri Hai Maa	Tarsh		
2021	Chup	Vikas		
2021	Teri Aadat	Abhi Dutt		
2021	Kareeb	Vishal Dadlani		
2021	Hone Laga Tumse Pyaar	Abhi Dutt		
2021	Dard Tere	Ishaan Khan, Shambhavi Thakur		
2021	Majnu	Prakriti Kakar, Sukriti Kakar, Mellow D		
2021	Wallah Wallah	Ishaan Khan		
2021	Mere Sanam	Yasser Desai		
2022	Tum Mili	Himself	Independent release	
2023	Teri Aadat 2	Abhi Dutt		
2023	Ek Danta 2.0	Mika Singh		
2023	Jaana Hai Toh Jaa	Raas, Sheetal		
2023	Latka	Amit Mishra, Shilpa Surroch		

== Awards and nominations ==
Year	Award	Category	Work	Result	Ref.
2014	Screen Awards	Best Child Artist	Dhoom 3	Nominated	
2015	Indian Television Academy Awards	Most Promising Child Star (Desh Ka Laadla)	Chakravartin Ashoka Samrat	Won	
2015	Gold Awards	Best Actor Debut (Male)	Chakravartin Ashoka Samrat	Won	
2015	Indian Telly Awards	Best Child Artiste (Male)	Chakravartin Ashoka Samrat	Won	
2015	Indian Telly Awards	Fresh New Face (Male)	Maha Kumbh: Ek Rahasaya, Ek Kahani	Nominated	
2019	Gold Awards	People's Favorite TV Actor	Aladdin – Naam Toh Suna Hoga	Won	
2019	Gold Awards	Best Onscreen Jodi (With Avneet Kaur)	Aladdin – Naam Toh Suna Hoga	Nominated	
2020	Gold Glam and Style Awards	Most Sought After Influencer (Male)	—N/a	Won	
2022	Nickelodeon Kids' Choice Awards India	Favorite TV Actor (Male)	Aladdin – Naam Toh Suna Hoga	Nominated	
2022	Nickelodeon Kids' Choice Awards India	Favourite Sibling Jodi (With Abhishek Nigam)	—N/a	Nominated	
2022	Nickelodeon Kids' Choice Awards India	Favorite Instagram Personality	—N/a	Won	
2022	Indian Television Academy Awards	Popular Actor – Drama	Hero – Gayab Mode On	Nominated	

== See also ==
- List of Indian television actors
- List of Indian male film actors
