= Susima =

Crown Prince of Magadha
- Predecessor: Bindusara
- Successor: Ashoka
- Born: c. 305 BC
- Died: c. 270 BC
- Spouse: chanda
- House: Maurya
- Father: Bindusara

Susima (also Sushima) was the crown prince of the Maurya Empire of ancient India and the eldest son and heir-apparent of the second Mauryan emperor Bindusara. He was next in line for his father's throne, but was defeated in a succession conflict by his younger half-brother, Ashoka, who eventually succeeded Bindusara as the third Mauryan emperor.

== Birth and family ==
Susima was the eldest son of the second Mauryan emperor, Bindusara. Not only was Susima the crown prince, but also his mother was a princess as opposed to Ashoka's mother, Subhadrangi, who was a commoner.

== Life ==
Susima was born to Bindusara, likely from his chief queen. He had several younger half-siblings, including Ashoka, born to Bindusara's second wife, Subhadrangi. Susima was well-educated and trained in the arts of war and statecraft. He was also a skilled archer and horseman.

When Bindusara fell ill in 273 BC, Susima was the clear heir to the throne. However, Ashoka was a popular figure among the army and the people. In supposed contrast to Susima, who was known to be rowdy and arrogant. He also had the support of Bindusara's chief minister, Radhagupta.

After Bindusara's death, a succession conflict broke out between Susima and Ashoka. Ashoka defeated Susima's forces and claimed the throne for himself. Susima was defeated in the fighting and he went in exile.

== Cultural depictions ==
- Ajith Kumar portrayed Sushim in the 2001 Bollywood film Aśoka.
- Ankit Arora portrayed the role of Sushim in the historical drama series Chakravartin Ashoka Samrat.
  - Sumedh Mudgalkar played the young version.
