= Maha Kumbh: Ek Rahasya, Ek Kahani =

- Logo
- Also known as: Maha Kumbh
- Genre: Supernatural; Mythological; Thriller
- Directed by: Arvind Babbal
- Starring: Siddharth Nigam; Gautam Rode; Payal Rajput; Manish Wadhwa; Rahil Azam; Ketki Dave; Seema Biswas
- Country of origin: India
- Original language: Hindi
- No. of episodes: 120

Production
- Producer: Arvind Babbal
- Production location: Varanasi
- Production company: Arvind Babbal Productions

Original release
- Network: Life OK
- Release: 15 December 2014 – 10 July 2015

Maha Kumbh: Ek Rahasya, Ek Kahani, also known as Maha Kumbh, is an Indian Hindi supernatural, mytho-thriller television show, produced and directed by Arvind Babbal. It stars Gautam Rode and Payal Rajput in lead roles. Arvind Babbal has been nominated at New York Festivals -International Television & Film Awards, 2016 in the Best Director (India) category for the show. 'Mahakumbh' won a 'Certificate of Merit' at the '52nd Chicago International Television Awards'.

This series has been dubbed into Telugu with the same title on Star Maa Gold from 5 June 2017.

== Plot ==
It is a thriller based story in the backdrop of Uttar Pradesh about a boy who possesses supernatural powers. Unaware of the gift as a child, as he grows older, his powers start showing. A girl named Maya starts liking Rudra. Meanwhile, Rudra is one of the seven protectors of Amrit which appears every 144 years during Mahakumbh. His father, Shivanand (Manish Wadhwa) is one of the leading Garudas.

The story begins with Baby Rudra visiting the Mahakumbh with his father. Then the bridge to Ganga is blown up as a plan of Balivesh, one of the leading priests of Mahakumbh, who has pledged his allegiance to the Naga clan. The Naga clan and the Garuda Clan have been battling for Amrit, the elixir of life every Mahakumbh. This has led to animosity between the two clans.

Rudra's father is kidnapped by a man named Mr. Greyerson, who describes himself as the member of a Secret society who had connection with Nazis precisely Thule Society. Mr. Greyerson brought Rudra's father to Poland where he is tortured and probed for the secret of Amrit. He had been exchanging notes with Dr.A.P.G. Rao (Doctor Aghast Parashar Gautam Rao) for the purpose of understanding the secret of Amrit scientifically. Meanwhile, Rudra is thrown into water due to the impact of the blast. He is saved by Udiya Baba (Robin Das), who takes him to Mai Mui (Seema Biswas) and Punnu.

He is brought up by Mai Mui, but is constantly hunted by Balivesh and Khoye Paye Pandey (Vineet Kumar). On the eve of Dussehra, he is attacked by Khoye Paye Pandey, under the instructions of Balivesh. The entire episode is eavesdropped by Udiya Baba, who tries to save Rudra who is on a chariot, getting ready to shoot an arrow at Ravana's effigy. The bomb has been planted in the chariot.

When Udiya Baba tries to save Rudra, the bomb explodes, but Rudra escapes unhurt. The burning effigy falls over Udiya Baba and he is badly hurt. Rudra brings him out of the fire miraculously. Udiya Baba is treated, but does not have long to live. He pleads Rudra to bring his wife for a final meeting. Rudra brings his wife and Udiya Baba passes away peacefully. However, Rudra realises that the Garuda Birthmark on his back is responsible for danger over his loved ones. He tries to peel it away with his rope, but is stopped by Mai Mui. Khoya Paye Pandey says that he knows Rudra's parents and takes Rudra to Balivesh where he is captured but later with help of his extra-ordinary powers escapes from Balivesh's clutches. Rudra escapes from Mai Mui as he thinks that Udiya Baba had died because of him and meets a vulgler who also has a garuda symbol like him later he comes back to Mai Mui. After some years leap Rudra is a grown up and he cemetres dead bodies in a river side. He meets maya with whom he later falls in love with, later mai mui is also killed by khoye paye pandey. Maya takes rudra to Prayagraj to her uncle Balivesh. Balivesh with his father wanted to kill Maya for a sacrifice. On one night rudras father sivanand comes back. He reveals to rudra that he is a garud and shivanavd is garud's head. There are 7 garudas who saves the Amrit. They had to find the other 5. Catherine a foreigner girl who comes to Prayagraj to explore mahakumbh and the boy whom rudra had met in the escape was sent by shivanand's teacher both are revealed to be garud. A woman who lived in the river side who is believed to be mentally ill is also a garud. An old woman resembles mai mui enters and is revealed to be a garud. A government officer who was finding cure for bad water of ganga is the 7th and last garud. The naga clan is revealed. Mai mui lookalike wakes rudras and then all the garudas powers. In the end, Rudra defeats the Nagas and sacrifices himself to save the people from the dangerous consequences of the venom of the snakes he defeated.

== Cast ==
- Siddharth Nigam/Gautam Rode as Rudra
- Payal Rajput as Maya
- Seema Biswas as Mai Mui/ Bhairavi
- Rahil Azam as Dansh
- Mala Salariya as Leela
- Manish Wadhwa as Shivanand
- Jannat Zubair Rahmani as Young Maya
- Sparsh Shrivastav as young Charles
- Mukul Nag as Gurudev
- Devish Ahuja as Punnu
- Sudesh Berry as Ashwatthama
- Sooraj Thapar as Vibhishana
- Azad Ansari as Charles
- Nissar Khan as DM Tiwari
- Kallirroi Tziafeta as Kathryn
- Ketki Dave as Thappadiya Mai
- Zachary Coffin as Mr. Greyerson
- Achal Nagesh Salwan as Swami Balivesh
- Mohan Maharishi as Professor Rao
- Ram Gopal Bajaj as Devesh
- Chetan Hansraj as Makardhwaj
- Surekha Sikri as Rudra's grandmother
- Arun Bali as Maharishi Kripa
- Shruti Ulfat as Ganga
- Paritosh Pandit as Punnu Tiwari
- Sunil Kumar Palwal as Animesh
- Robin Das as Udiya Baba
- Vineet Kumar as Khoye Paye Pandey
- Tinu Verma as Raja Bali
- Naagesh Salwan as Swami Parvesh

== Production and promotion ==
Maha Kumbh is produced and directed by Arvind Babbal under the banner of Arvind Babbal Productions.

Siddharth Nigam played the role of young Rudra. Actor Mohit Raina was initially considered to play the lead. The makers were confused between Mohit Raina and Gautam Rode, but the channel finalised Gautam. The casting of the lead heroine was the subject of much press speculation; Aakanksha Singh, Kirti Kalhari and Payal Rajput were rumoured to be involved. Eventually Payal Rajput was selected to star opposite Gautam Rode as the female lead. Seema Biswas, Manish Wadhwa, Azad Ansari, Kelly, Acha Nagesh, Shruti Ulfat, to name a few played pivotal roles. Later when Seema Biswas quit the show, Surekha Sikri entered the show as Rudra's grandmother.

Maha Kumbh was the first Indian TV series promoted at the Times Square by Life OK. The show has been promoted by an online campaign called Mahakumbh 1 Min in which actors challenge each other to do things within 1 minute.
