= Rushiraj Pawar =

Indian television actor (born 1997)

- Born: 15 October 1997 (age 29); Mumbai, Maharashtra, India
- Occupation: Actor
- Years active: 2011–present
- Known for: Chandragupta Maurya; Devon Ke Dev...Mahadev; Bharat Ka Veer Putra – Maharana Pratap; RadhaKrishn; Shrimad Ramayan
- Parents: Vrindavan Pawar (father); Mangala Pawar (mother)
- Relatives: Rohit Pawar

Rushiraj Pawar (born 15 October 1997) is an Indian actor who mainly works in Hindi television. Pawar earned recognition with his portrayals of Chandragupta Maurya in Chandragupta Maurya, Kartikeya in Devon Ke Dev...Mahadev, Patta in Bharat Ka Veer Putra – Maharana Pratap, Ayan in RadhaKrishn and Meghnada in Shrimad Ramayan.

== Personal life ==
Pawar was born on 15 October 1997 in Mumbai, Maharashtra, India in a Hindu Marathi family.

== Career ==
Pawar made his acting debut with the Marathi film, Manyaa The Wonder Boy, playing the young Manya. He then made his television debut the same year, playing the young Chandragupta Maurya in Chandragupta Maurya. For his performance, he won the ITA Award for Best Child Artist.

From 2012 to 2014, Pawar played Kartikeya in Devon Ke Dev...Mahadev. Also in 2013, he played Suryakant "Surya" Shastri (younger version of Akshay Kumar) in Boss.

In 2015, Pawar first played Parijaat in Maharakshak: Devi. That same year Pawar played, Patta Chundawat in Bharat Ka Veer Putra – Maharana Pratap.

In 2016, he played Sona Nanda in Chandra Nandini. Then, he played Young Malhar Rao Holkar in Peshwa Bajirao, in 2017. From 2017 to 2018, he played Shani in Chakradhari Ajay Krishna.

From 2018 to 2020, Pawar played Ayan in RadhaKrishn. For his performance, he received the Indian Telly Award for Best Actor in a Negative Role nomination. In 2023, Pawar played Udmi Ram in an episode of Swaraj. In the same year, he also played Banasura in Tulsidham Ke Laddu Gopal.

Since February 2024, Pawar is seen portraying Meghnath in Shrimad Ramayan. From June to September 2025, he also portrayed the contrasting twin brothers Malla and Mani in Shiv Shakti. From February 2026 to present, he is playing Shanidev for the third time in Gatha Shiv Parivaar Ki: Ganesh Kartikey.

== Filmography ==
=== Films ===
Year	Title	Role	Notes	Ref.
2011	Manyaa The Wonder Boy	Young Manyaa	Marathi film	
2013	Boss	Young Suryakant "Surya" Shastri		

=== Television ===
Year	Title	Role	Notes	Ref.
2011	Chandragupta Maurya	Young Chandragupta Maurya		
2011	Nachle Ve with Saroj Khan	Contestant	Guest appearance	
2012-2014	Devon Ke Dev...Mahadev	Kartikeya		
2015	Maharakshak: Devi	Parijaat		
2015	Bharat Ka Veer Putra – Maharana Pratap	Patta Chundawat		
2016	Chandra Nandini	Sona Nanda		
2017	Peshwa Bajirao	Young Malhar Rao Holkar		
2017-2018	Chakradhari Ajay Krishna	Shani		
2018-2020	RadhaKrishn	Ayan		
2023	Swaraj	Udmi Ram	Episode: "Udmi Ram and Ratni Devi"	
2023	Tulsidham Ke Laddu Gopal	Banasura		
2024	Shrimad Ramayan	Meghanada		
2025	Veer Hanuman - Bolo Bajrang Bali Ki Jai	Shani		
2025	Shiv Shakti – Tap Tyaag Tandav	Malla / Mani		
2026	Gatha Shiv Parivar Ki Ganesh Kartikeya	Shani Dev		

== Awards and nominations ==
Year	Award	Category	Work	Result	Ref.
2011	Indian Television Academy Awards	Best Child Artist	Chandragupta Maurya	Won	
2012	Indian Telly Awards	Best Child Artiste - Male	Chandragupta Maurya	Nominated	
2019	Indian Telly Awards	Best Actor in a Negative Role	RadhaKrishn	Nominated	
2025	Indian Telly Awards	Best actor in a negative role	Shiv Shakti	Nominated	
