= Chandra Nandini =

Indian historical television series

- Genre: Historical drama
- Created by: Ekta Kapoor; Shobha Kapoor
- Based on: Chandragupta Maurya
- Written by: R M Joshi; Neha Singh
- Directed by: Ranjan Kumar Singh; Mukesh Kumar Singh; Deepak S Garg
- Creative directors: Sujata Rao; Kadar kazi(kk)
- Starring: Rajat Tokas; Shweta Basu Prasad; Siddharth Nigam; Avneet Kaur; Ahmad Harhash
- Country of origin: India
- Original language: Hindi
- No. of seasons: 1
- No. of episodes: 286

Production
- Executive producer: Ranjan Jenaa Shubhraj Sharma
- Producer: Ekta Kapoor
- Production locations: Mumbai, India
- Cinematography: Ravi Naidu
- Camera setup: Single-camera
- Running time: 22 minutes approx.
- Production company: Balaji Telefilms

Original release
- Network: StarPlus
- Release: 10 October 2016 – 10 November 2017

Chandra Nandini is an Indian Hindi-language historical drama television series that aired on StarPlus from 10 October 2016 until 10 November 2017. It was produced by Ekta Kapoor under her banner Balaji Telefilms and directed by Ranjan Kumar Singh. Starring Rajat Tokas as Chandragupta Maurya and Shweta Basu Prasad as a princess Nandni, the story is loosely based on the life of Chandragupta Maurya.

== Synopsis ==
The show starts with a voice-over of mother India talking about Chandragupta Maurya and Nandini. A local king, Suryagupta Maurya rules the country with his pregnant wife, Moora. An invitation comes from Magadha for a festival. When they go there, the Queen of Magadha, Avantika is cheating her husband with a barber named Nanda. When Suryagupta finds it, Nanda kills the King of Magadha. Then, Nanda kills Suryagupta and becomes Mahapadma Nanda, the Emperor of Magadha. Moora escapes and delivers a boy. She hides her son in a cattle pound and is arrested by Nanda. A woman named Kanika finds Moora's son and adopts him as Chandra, unaware of his truth.

=== 8 years later ===
Chandra lives with his adopted parents. Moora is still in Nanda's prison and waits for her son. Nanda and Avantika had a daughter, Nandini after nine sons. Meanwhile, Chandra leaves home as Kanika suffers from her husband because of him. He reaches Magadha and meets Chanakya, who tries to save Magadh from Nanda. Chanakya sees Chandra's talents and realizes that Chandra is the future king. He keeps Chandra in his presence and teaches him.

=== 9 years later ===
Now, Chandra is grown up and becomes talented. He tries to attack Magadha and eventually succeeds with the help of small kings. Nandini marries Chandra to save her mother and kingdom. Eventually, love blossoms between them. Nandini's twin sister, Roopa tries to kill Nandini. Nanda stabs Nandini mistaking her to be Roopa, post which Nandini realizes about Nanda's reality. Nanda and Seleucus plan to attack Chandra. Chandra convinces Seleucus not to fight against him and decides to make Nicator's daughter, Helena as the chief queen of Magadha. Chandra's second wife, Durdhara, who is pregnant, becomes sick. Helena poisons Durdhara and kills her. Durdhara's son, Bindusara was taken out by surgery. Helena makes Chandra into believing that Nandini killed Durdhara. Believing her, Chandra banishes Nandini out of Magadha.

=== 1 year later ===
Chandra now lives with Helena and Bindusara. Nandini is teaching other royal kids at a Gurukul. Chandra brings Nandini back to Magadh and as Bindusara's nanny. Nanda and his minister, Amatya Rakshas send a Vishkanya (poisonous seductress) to Magadha to kill Chandra. She arrives in the Magadha as a princess Vishaka. Vishaka tries to seduce Chandra, and he pretends to fall in love with her to irritate Nandini.

Chandra decides to marry Vishaka, and he prepares for the grand wedding. Vishaka's plans to kill Chandra all go in vain every time because Nandini intervenes and saves him. Nandini exposes Vishaka, and the Vishkanya is imprisoned. Helena's mother, Apama slow poisons Nandini. Nandini is pushed into a very critical state and finally saved by Vishaka's poison. Chandra exposes Apama as Durdhara's murderer and apologises to Nandini for his mistakes.

=== 8 years later ===
Chandra and Nandini are leading a happy life with Bindusara. Nandini is pregnant with Chandra's child. Helena feels jealous and manipulates Bindusara into believing that Nandini had killed Durdhara in past. Blindly believing Helena, Bindusara starts to hate Nandini and decides to take revenge. In a hunting trip, Bindusara pushes Nandini from a cliff. He lies to everyone that Nandini had slipped from the cliff accidentally. Chandra grieves for Nandini's death and forgets his royal duties.

=== 10 years later ===
Chandra is living like an ascetic after Nandini's unexpected death. Magadha is now under Helena's rule. Bindusara, Malayketu and Chaaya's son, Bhadraketu, Helena's children, Alice and Adonis, are all grown up. Helena is still keeping Bindusara as her puppet and poisons his mind. On the other hand, Nandini is alive and is saved by an older man. She has lost her memory and lives as Prabha now. She shares a motherly bond with the older man's granddaughter, Dharma. Prabha and Dharma visit Magadh as servants in the royal palace. Dharma started to hold a grudge against Bindusara. Chandra also finds Prabha, and he makes her his queen again. However, Helena provokes Bindusara against Chandra, which results in a great misunderstanding. Bindusara marries a princess Charumati, who ill-treats Dharma. Alice falls in love with Prince Karthikey of Champanagar and wishes to marry him. She also informs her mother, Helena. Helena decides to make Chitralekha, Karthikey's sister to marry Bindusara so that Alice can marry Karthikeyan. She prepares for the wedding ceremony. On the wedding day, Chithraleka, who is already in love with Bhadraketu, runs away and asks Dharma to replace her in the marriage. Dharma unwillingly marries Bindusara. Later he thanks her for saving his dignity and promises that he will soon break the marriage. A new problem arises when Bhimdev claims Nandini to be his wife, Savitri, who enters the palace. Chandra and Nandini's relationship is put to the test.

It is then revealed that this man is a sorcerer, and he, along with his wife Mohini, put black magic on Chandra to separate him and Nandini. They are ordered by a mysterious person named Swanand to kill Chandra. But, Chanakya finds out about the secret of Bhimdev and Mohini. Both Chanakya and Nandini save Chandra from the effects of black magic. Nandini regains her memory and realizes her true identity.

Finally, the mysterious man, Swanand, attacks Magadh and tries to kill Chandra and takeover Magadh. But, Chandra and Bindusara overpower his army, and they kill him. Chandra and Nandini are reunited. Chandra forgives Helena on Nandini's request and sends her back to Greece with her children. Bindusara apologises to Nandini for his past mistakes. He starts to like Dharma, and they all live happily.

== Cast ==
=== Main cast ===
- Rajat Tokas as Chandragupta "Chandra" Maurya: Emperor of Magadha; Suryagupta and Moora's son; Chhaya's brother; Chanakya's student; Durdhara's widower; Helena and Nandini's husband; Bindusara, Alice and Adonis's father (2016–2017)
  - Jineet Rath as Child Prince Chandragupta Maurya of Magadha (2016)
- Shweta Basu Prasad as
  - Nandini Maurya: Empress Consort of Magadha; Nanda and Avantika's daughter; Roopa's twin sister; Chandragupta's third wife; Bindusara, adonis, alice stepmother. Dharma's adoptive mother. (2016–2017)
    - Angel Roopchandani as Child Princess Nandini of Magadha (2016)
  - Roopa - Nandini's evil twin (2016) (dead)
- Saanvi Talwar as Durdhara Maurya: Empress Consort of Magadha; Chandragupta's second wife; Bindusara's mother. Adonis and alice's stepmother.(2016–2017)
- Tanu Khan as Helena Maurya: Empress Consort of Magadha; Seleucus and Apama's daughter; Chandragupta's first wife; Alice and Adonis's mother, Bindusara's step-mother. (2016–2017)

=== Recurring cast ===
- Siddharth Nigam as Bindusara Maurya: Crown Prince of Magadha; Chandragupta and Durdhara's son; helena and Nandini's stepson; Alice and Adonis's half-brother; Charumitra and Dharma's husband. (2017)
  - Ayaan Zubair Rahmani as Child Prince Bindusara Maurya of Magadha (2017)
- Avneet Kaur as Princess Charumitra /Charumati Maurya – Bindusara's first wife. Chandragupta and durdhara's daughter in law. (2017)
- Prerna Sharma as Dharma Maurya – Nandini's adopted daughter; Bindusara's second wife. Chandragupta and durdhara's daughter in law(2017)
- Arpit Ranka as Samrat Mahapadma Nanda – Former Emperor of Magadha; Avantika's husband; Nandini and her nine brother's father (2016–17) (Dead)
- Mansi Sharma as Maharani Avantika – Former Empress consort of Magadha; Former wife of King Ajatshatru, Nanda's second wife; Nandini and her nine brother's mother. (2016–17)
- Vidya Sinha as Sonarika – Suryagupta's mother; Chhaya and Chandragupta's grandmother; Bindusara, Bhadraketu, Alice and Adonis's great-grandmother (2016–17)
- Papiya Sengupta as Queen mother Moora Maurya: Suryagupta's wife; Chhaya and Chandragupta's mother; Bindusara, Bhadraketu, Alice and Adonis's grandmother. (2016–2017)
- Urfi Javed / Piya Valecha as Princess Chhaya – Suryagupta and Moora's daughter; Chandragupta's sister; Malayketu's wife; Bhadraketu's mother. (2016–17)
- Chetan Hansraj as Maharaj Malayketu – Chhaya's second husband; Bhadraketu's father. (2016–2017)
- Abhishek Nigam as Prince Bhadraketu – Chhaya and Malayketu's son; Chitralekha's husband. (2017)
- Abhijeet Sooryvanshe (2017)
- Pragati Chourasiya as Princess Chitralekha – Princess of Champanagar; Bhadraketu's wife. (2017)
- Gautam Nain as Prince Adonis Maurya – Chandragupta and Helena's son; Alice's brother; Bindusara's half-brother. (2017)
- Nirisha Basnett as Princess Alice Maurya – Chandragupta and Helena's daughter; Adonis's sister; Bindusara's half-sister; Kartikey's wife (2017)
- Sheezan Khan as Prince Kartikay – Prince of Champanagar; Alice's husband (2017)
- Sheeba Chaddha as Apama – Queen Consort of Greece; Seleucus's wife; Helena's mother. (2017)
- Kristian Hedegaard Petersen as Seleucus I Nikator – King of Greece; Apama's husband; Helena's father. (2016–2017)
- Ishaan Singh Manhas as Satyajeet – Chhaaya's first husband (2016)
- Lokesh Batta as Dhana Nanda – Mahapadma Nanda's son (2016)
- Rushiraj Pawar as Sona Nanda – Dhana Nanda's son (2016)
- Danish Bagga as Pandugrath – Mahapadma Nanda's seemingly mentally disabled son. (2016–17)
- Geetanjali Mishra as Maharani Sunanda – Mahapadma Nanda's first wife (2016–17)
- Himanshu Rai as Subhadra – Chanakya's pupil
- Vibhuti Thakur as Kanika – Chandragupta's foster mother (2016–17)
- Andrea Ravera as Megasthenes
- Khushboo Shroff as Gautami
- Ankur Malhotra as Maharaj Ambhi (2016)
- Vikas Salgotra as Maharaj Pauras (Porus) (2016)
- Shikha Singh as a Princess (cameo role) (2016)
- Pooja Banerjee as Princess "Vishakha" Vishkanya. (2017)
- Ahad Ali Aamir as Prince Bandhir (2017)
- Charmi Dhami as Princess Tilottama – Maadhav and Maalti's daughter (2017)
- Lavina Tandon as Mohini - an enchantress (2017)
- Athar Siddiqui as Bheem Dev - Mohini's husband (2017)
- Rahul Sharma as Madhav Chandra's cousin brother)
- Ekroop Bedi as Kinnari - Nandini's best friend (2016)
- Garima Arora as Madhuram
- Vikas Singh Rajput
- Manoj Kolhatkar

== Production ==
This is regarded as one of the costliest series produced by Ekta Kapoor under Balaji Telefilms. On 21 September 2016, a press conference was held in Mumbai with the presence of Producer Ekta Kapoor and some actors including the leads Rajat Tokas and Shweta Basu Prasad. Director Santram Verma who directed the pilot episode of the series opted out after it and was replaced by Ranjan Kumar Singh.

In October 2016, about 300 horses were auditioned for a sequence for the lead Tokas.

Speaking about his role male lead Rajat Tokas said, "I am really looking forward to portraying the mighty king, Chandragupta Maurya. His and Nandni’s story is very different from what we’ve seen on TV so far. Theirs is a love story written with hatred." Female lead Shwetha Basu Prasad said, "This show marks my comeback on TV after quite some time. The character of Nandni is that of a strong princess, whose emotions and struggles, every woman would resonate with."

In 2017, the storyline of the series took a leap. During which Siddharth Nigam joined the cast as Bindusara, Avneet Kaur as Charumati. The series ended on 10 November 2017, due to fluctuations in its viewership, with Chandragupta becoming a Buddhist monk. The shooting of the series was completed on 2 November 2017.

=== Training ===
I will be paying attention to some of the nuances of that era and that character with the body language of a warrior princess, which will soon require me to learn sword fighting and horse riding. I have been reading on Magadh and Mauryan history a lot these days.

— Shweta Basu Prasad

=== Filming ===
The initial scenes of the series was shot in the ancient locations of Magadh and Pataliputra in Patna. But, the series was mainly filmed in Mumbai.

== Reception ==
India Today quoted the series as more masala, less history and reviewed, "The creators of the show have taken generous amount of creative liberty with the original story or history. The actors are not that bad; in fact, they are pretty okay. The palace looks super-animated, like it has just been put on the screen as an afterthought."

The Times of India stated, "Going by the trailer, Shweta Basu fits the role of Chandragupta's wife perfectly. When it comes to showcasing opulence, there is no one who does it better than Ekta Kapoor. Right from the costume to the setting, one can expect grand locations and beautifully decked men and women."

== Adaptations ==
The series was dubbed in Tamil aired on Star Vijay. In Sri Lanka, the show is broadcast in Sinhala on the Swarnavahini network. In Hindi the series airs in Malaysia on TV3.

== Historical accuracy and inaccuracy ==
While the character of Chandragupta and some of the wars and conflicts shown are almost historically accurate, the character of Princess Nandni of Magadha itself along with her twin Roopa is considered completely fictional by many sources. Most historians said, Chandragupta married only twice, first to Durdhara who died while giving birth to Bindusara and years after he was married to daughter of Seleucus I Nicator (Helena as per the show) in a war-peace treaty. Chandragupta defeated Selecus and then arranged a peace treaty, Chandragupta didn't convince Selecus before the war. Queen Nandni as per the show is described as daughter of the real Mahapadma Nanda which is contradicted as there is no historical evidence. It has been said Nandni's characterization is based upon most of Durdhara character derived from historical texts, novelization and poetries.
