= Chetan Hansraj =

Indian television actor (born 1972)

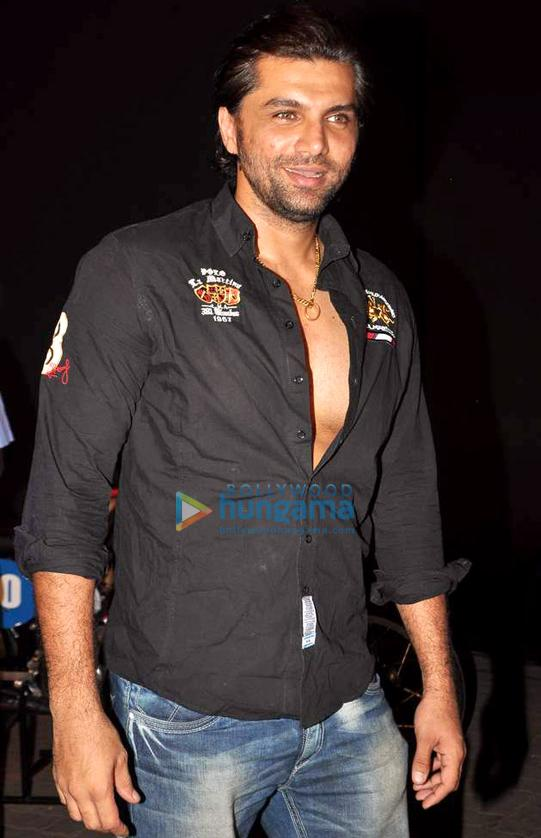
- Born: 15 June 1972 (age 54); Bombay, Maharashtra, India
- Occupation: Actor
- Years active: 1980–present
- Height: 1.88 m (6 ft 2 in)
- Spouse: Lavania Pereira (m. 2004)
- Children: Ethan Hansraj
- Parents: Kumar Hansraj; Shakuntala Hansraj
- Relatives: Nausheel Hansraj (brother); Jugal Hansraj (cousin)

Chetan Hansraj (born 15 June 1972) is an Indian film and television actor.

== Career ==
Hansraj started his career as a child actor in 1980, appearing in over 250 press advertisements and 30 ad films. His debut film Kook Doo Koo was selected for the Children's Films Festival in France in 1984. He made his television debut portraying young Balram in Mahabharat (1988) by B. R. Chopra.

He played Garv in Kkusum. Later, he appeared in Kahaani Ghar Ghar Kii as Sasha, Virrudh as Rudraksh and Dharti Ka Veer Yodha Prithviraj Chauhan as Raja Bhimdev. He also appeared in the music video of Shweta Shetty's pop album song Deewane to Deewane hai, with Kushal Punjabi and Akashdeep Saigal, which was released in 1997. He also appeared in reality shows like Fear Factor India and Iss Jungle Se Mujhe Bachao.

== Personal life ==
Hansraj married Lavania Pereira on 12 December 2004, and the couple has a son named Ethan Hansraj, who was born on 2 February 2006.

Actor Jugal Hansraj is his cousin.

== Television ==
Year	Serial	Role
1989	Mahabharat	Young Balram
2001	Ssshhhh...Koi Hai – Doosri Dulhan	Raja Saab / Pahadi Raja (Episode 18)
2002	Ssshhhh...Koi Hai – Ghar	Michael (Episode 28)
2002	Ssshhhh...Koi Hai – Samandar	Sotya (Episode 35)
2002	Krishna Arjun	Rahul (Episode 3 & Episode 4)
2002	Ssshhhh...Koi Hai – Vikraal Aur Bhayanak Bansuri	Benu (Episode 59)
2002–2004	Kyun Hota Hai Pyarrr	Rocky
2003	Ssshhhh...Koi Hai – Vikraal Aur Dracula: Part 1 to Part 3	Dracula (Episode 86 to Episode 88)
2003–2005	Kkusum	Advocate Garv Sachdev
2004	Kya Hadsaa Kya Haqeeqat – Kab Kaisey Kahan	Moksh Chauhan (Episode 226 to Episode 252)
2004–2008	Kahaani Ghar Ghar Kii	Shashank "Sasha" Garg
2005	Kkavyanjali	Chetan Hansraj
2005	Instant Khichdi	Rakesh
2005	Kaisa Ye Pyar Hai	Josh
2005	Kyunki Saas Bhi Kabhi Bahu Thi	Inspector Maan Singh Chauhan
2006	CID – Murder At Midnight	Dhruv (Episode 412)
2006	Twinkle Beauty Parlour Lajpat Nagar	Ranjeet Singh
2006–2007	Dharti Ka Veer Yodha Prithviraj Chauhan	Maharaj Bheemdev
2006–2007	Kaajjal	Dhruv
2007	Lucky – Bhediya : Part 1 to Part 3	Bhediya (Episode 13 to Episode 15)
2007	Ssshhhh...Phir Koi Hai – Tattoo Man	Max (Episode 20)
2007	Virrudh	Rudraksh Raisinghania
2008	Kahaani Hamaaray Mahaabhaarat Ki	Bheemsen
2009	Baa Bahoo Aur Baby	Kukku
2010–2011	Mata Ki Chowki	Rudra "Bali" Narayan
2012	Veer Shivaji	Inayat Khan
2012	Kya Huaa Tera Vaada	Shaurya Mitra
2013–2014	Jodha Akbar	Adham Khan
2014–2015	Jodha Akbar	Haider Khan
2014	Encounter	Mangesh "Mangya" Waghmare (Episode 7 to Episode 9)
2014	SuperCops Vs Super Villains	Danny (Episode 16)
2014	Devon Ke Dev...Mahadev	Nigas
2014	Har Mushkil Ka Hal Akbar Birbal	Rehmat Khan
2015	Savdhaan India	A.C.P. (Episode 1118)
2015	Maha Kumbh: Ek Rahasaya, Ek Kahani	Makardhwaj
2015	Bhagyalaxmi	Yuvraj Malhotra
2016	Janbaaz Sindbad	Rawat
2016	Naagarjuna – Ek Yoddha	Naagraj
2016	Ek Tha Raja Ek Thi Rani	Kaal Singh
2016–2017	Chandra Nandini	Malayketu
2017	Peshwa Bajirao	Muhammad Azam Shah
2017	Partners Trouble Ho Gayi Double	Manjeet Singh
2017–2018	Mahakali – Anth Hi Aarambh Hai	Malla
2018	Laal Ishq – Soul Transformation	Abhishek (Episode 16)
2018–2019	Naagin 3	Anand "Andy" Sehgal
2019	Haiwaan : The Monster	Yeti Master
2019	RadhaKrishn	Ravan
2020	Alif Laila	Magician Mingla
2020	Brahmarakshas 2	Vardaan Chaudhary "Brahmarakshas"
2021	Mann Kee Awaaz Pratigya 2	Balwant Tyagi
2021	Mauka-E-Vardaat	Senior Inspector Harshvardhan Shekhawat
2022	Shubh Shagun	Brijesh
2023	Bekaboo	Shekhar Raichand
2024	Pracchand Ashok	Samrat Bindusar Maurya
2024	Shiv Shakti – Tap Tyaag Tandav	Maharishi Parshuram
2024	Taaza Khabar	Ikka

=== Non-fiction shows ===
- 2006 Fear Factor India as Contestant
- 2008 Mr. & Ms. TV as Contestant
- 2008 Kaun Jeetega Bollywood Ka Ticket as Contestant
- 2008 Saas v/s Bahu as Guest
- 2008 Nach Baliye 4 as Contestant
- 2009 Iss Jungle Se Mujhe Bachao as Contestant
- 2013 Welcome – Baazi Mehmaan Nawazi Ki as Contestant
- 2022 Lock Upp (Season 1) as Contestant [Entered-Day 21, Ejected-Day 27]

== Filmography ==
Key
†	Denotes films that have not yet been released

Year	Film	Role	Language	Notes
2004	Assambhav		Hindi	
2006	Anthony Kaun Hai	Lucky Sharma	Hindi	
2007	Don	Anthony	Telugu	Debut
2008	Bhram	Prem Mathur	Hindi, English	
2010	City Of Gold		Hindi	
2011	Bodyguard	Mhatre	Hindi	
2013	Once Upon a Time in Mumbai Dobaara	Jimmy	Hindi	
2013	Shootout at Wadala	Potya	Hindi	
2014	Anjaan	Manoj	Tamil	Debut
2015	Hero	Changhezi	Hindi	
2017	FU: Friendship Unlimited		Marathi	Debut
2020	Big Brother	Vinayaraj	Malayalam	Malayalam debut
2021	The Power	Fakira	Hindi	
2026	Ramayana: Part 1	Raja Sumali	Hindi	
