= Kabhie Kabhie (2003 TV series) =

- Directed by: Saurabh Sengupta; Imtiaz Alam
- Opening theme: "Kabhie Kabhie"; Music: Santosh Shrivastav
- Country of origin: India
- No. of seasons: 1
- No. of episodes: 23

Production
- Producers: Sanjay Chandna; Saurabh Sengupta
- Editor: Imtiaz Alam
- Running time: 52 minutes

Original release
- Network: Zee TV
- Release: 9 October 2003 – 11 March 2004

Kabhie Kabhie is an anthology television series that premiered on 9 October 2003 on Zee TV, featuring small stories.

== Episodes ==
The list of some of the episodes [short stories] that aired under Kabhie Kabhie:

No.	Title
1	"Agnipariksha"
The story focuses on the life of a successful politician Raghav Rai and his wife Janaki Rai. The twist comes when one very day Janaki gets abducted by terrorists, and Raghav refuses to bow down to their demands to save his wife, but chooses the country's safety instead. Contrarily, Janaki gets released by the terrorists because she helps the terrorist leader Iqbal recover from an injury during an encounter. But, when Janaki goes back to her home, her mother-in-law demands her to prove her 'purity'. Nonetheless, Janaki's reports turn out to be negative when she gets herself tested. After all that turmoil, Janaki convinces her husband Raghav to help the terrorists, and when he decides to help, his opposition parties make false allegations on Raghav about his wife having an illicit relationship with the terrorist leader Iqbal. Hearing this, Raghav's mother wants him to get separate from Janaki, to consolidate his position in the party. Janaki gets heart-broken with the hypocrisy and decides to leave her house forever.: Cast: Rajat Kapoor as Raghav Rai; Aarti Bahl as Janaki; and Suhasini Mulay as Raghav's mother; Rajesh Khera as Iqbal
2	"Bharosa"
The story explores the subtle shades of a man-woman relationship in a marriage.: Cast: Bhagyashree, Rajesh Tandon, & Rajesh Khera
3	"Vansh"
The story is set in West Bengal, India during a pre-independence era, and revolves around a rich 'zamindari' family.: Cast: Ayesha Jhulka, Rajat Kapoor, & Rohit Roy
4	"Haque-Kashish"
The story is set against the backdrop of an ordinary 'Muslim' family where the husband, Feroze divorces his loving wife Kashish for his girlfriend. But, when his girlfriend betrays him, he wants to obtain Kashish back. The problem is that she is married to someone else now. However, Feroze goes to Kashish's house and tells her husband that he really loves her and will accept her with his unborn child. For the sake of Kashish, her husband divorces her and she gets back with Feroze.: Cast: Divya Dutta, Anup Soni, Sooraj Thapar, & Nishigandha Wad
5	"Amar Prem"
The story is of a psychiatrist and his wife who are faced with a dilemma when a woman approaches the husband and claims to be his wife from previous birth.: Cast: Varsha Usgaonkar, Rajat Kapoor, & Seema Shetty
6	"Naam"
The story is about a university professor who accompanies one of his best students for his project report to a remote tribal village. The professor has had sweet memories of that village which he had visited while he himself was a student dedicated to tribal welfare and development.: Cast: Sanober Kabir, Shahrukh Barucha, Sonia Kapoor, and Sadiya Siddiqui
15	"Mamata"
The story revolves around the life of a divorced mother who is torn between her motherhood and her career.: Cast: Varsha Usgaonkar, Vaishnavi Mahant, and Sooraj Thapar

=== Other episodes ===
No.	Title
TBA	"Ankahi"
TBA	"Devdasi"
TBA	"Grahan"
TBA	"Jagruti"
TBA	"Khwaish"
TBA	"Rishta"
TBA	"Swarag-Narak"
TBA	"Pal Pal dilke paas"
TBA	"Uttar Dakshin"
