= Yashashri Masurkar =

Indian television actress (born 1986)

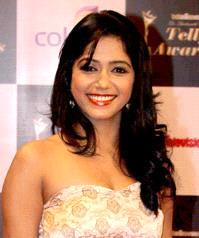
- Masurkar in 2014
- Born: 30 December 1986 (age 39); Mumbai, Maharashtra, India
- Occupation: Actress
- Years active: 2010–present

Yashashri Masurkar is an Indian actress and voice artist known for her work in Hindi television productions. She is best known for playing the role of Kanak in Star One's drama series Rang Badalti Odhani which was her acting debut. Yashashri has also been part of various other shows, including Sanskaar – Dharohar Apnon Ki, Chakravartin Ashoka Samrat, and Krishnadasi. Additionally, she participated in Bigg Boss Marathi 4.

== Career ==
Masurkar made her acting debut in the Marathi series Laxman Resha. She rose to popularity as Kanak in Rang Badalti Odhani, where her chemistry with Karan Tacker garnered attention. Soon after the series came to a close, she bagged the role of Mrignayani in Chandragupta Maurya on Imagine TV, which she quit shortly after. After a short stint on Sanskaar – Dharohar Apnon Ki, she joined the cast of Do Dil Bandhe Ek Dori Se. Her negative role in the show generated angry reactions from viewers. In 2015, she was roped in to play Agnishikha in Chakravartin Ashoka Samrat. Later, she appeared in Krishnadasi and several other shows in supporting roles. Yashashri was seen on Bigg Boss Marathi 4.

== Filmography ==
=== Films ===
Year	Title	Role
2016	Laal Ishq	Nisha
2021	Kabaad: The Coin	Savita
2026	Lagna Aani Barach Kahi	Writer

=== Television ===
Year	Title	Role	Notes
2010–2011	Rang Badalti Odhani	Kanak Shantanu Khandelwal	
2011	Chandragupta Maurya	Rajkumari Mriganayani	
2013	Sanskaar – Dharohar Apnon Ki	Bharati	
2013–2014	Do Dil Bandhe Ek Dori Se	Sumitra	
2014	Pyaar Tune Kya Kiya	Sonal	
2015	Code Red	Poonam (Episode 56)	Episodic Role
2015	Chakravartin Ashoka Samrat	Rajkumari Agnishikha	
2015	Hum Aapke Ghar Mein Rehte Hain	Nagina	
2017	Savdhaan India	Deepti Sirohi	
2017	Aarambh: Kahaani Devsena Ki	Mekala	
2019	Crime Patrol	Mandira/Neha/Anushka Bhosale	Episode 901/928/972
2021	Kyun Utthe Dil Chhod Aaye	Saroj	
2022	Bigg Boss Marathi 4	Contestant (Evicted Day 49)	14th place
2023–2024	Dabangii – Mulgii Aayi Re Aayi	Bela Ankush Rajyavadhkar	
