= Manish Wadhwa =

Indian actor and voice actor (born 1972)

- Born: 1972 (age 53–54); Ambala, Haryana (India)
- Occupations: Actor, voice actor
- Years active: 1988–present
- Known for: Chandragupta Maurya; Paramavatar Shri Krishna; Peshwa Bajirao; Gadar 2
- Spouse: Priyanka Wadhwa
- Website: https://www.manishwadhwa.in/

Manish Wadhwa (born 1972) is an Indian actor and voice actor. He is best known for his roles Chanakya in Chandragupta Maurya, Balaji Vishwanath Bhatt in Peshwa Bajirao, Kans in Paramavatar Shri Krishna, Amal Nanda/Dansh in Hero – Gayab Mode On and Major General Hamid Iqbal In Gadar 2.

== Filmography ==
=== Films ===
Year	Title	Role	Notes
2001	Rahul	Rohit Singh	
2004	Netaji Subhas Chandra Bose: The Forgotten Hero	Captain Inayat Gyani	
2018	Padmaavat	Gandharv Sen	
2019	Manikarnika: The Queen of Jhansi	Moropant	
2021	Shyam Singha Roy	Mahant	Telugu film
2023	Pathaan	General Qadir	
2023	Gadar 2	Major General Hamid Iqbal	
2024	Bhool Bhulaiyaa 3	Rajpurohit	
2025	Deva	Prabhat Jadhav	
2025	Badass Ravi Kumar	Zaid Bashir	

=== Television ===
Year	Title	Role	Notes	Ref.
2002	Aamrapali	Ajatashatru		
2005	Kohinoor	Kaali		
2008	Raajkumar Aaryyan	Bhootnath		
2009	Shaurya Aur Suhani	Takshak		
2009–2010	Mitwa Phool Kamal Ke	Nirbhay Choudhary		
2010	Crime Patrol - Crime Patrol In Chambal	Dacoit Leader	Season 3 - Episode 1	
2011	Chandragupta Maurya	Chanakya		
2013	Devon Ke Dev...Mahadev	Raavan		
2013–2015	Iss Pyaar Ko Kya Naam Doon? Ek Baar Phir	Niranjan Agnihotri		
2014–2015	Maha Kumbh: Ek Rahasaya, Ek Kahani	Shivanand		
2015	Time Machine	Dr. Kartik Devraj		
2015–2016	Siya Ke Ram	Vishwamitra		
2016	Naagarjuna – Ek Yoddha	Vasuki		
2016	Dahleez	Advocate Arjun Sanghvi		
2017	Peshwa Bajirao	Balaji Vishwanath Bhat		
2017–2019	Paramavatar Shri Krishna	Kans		
2020	Kahat Hanuman Jai Shri Ram	Ravana		
2020–2021	Hero – Gayab Mode On	Amal Nanda		
2026–present	Hastinapur Ke Veer	Bhishma		

=== Web series ===
Year	Title	Role	Notes	Ref.
2023	The Railway Men	Mirza		
2026	Prayagraj Ki Love Story	Vivek Dahiya		

== Dubbing career ==
He began his career performing at the theatre in Mumbai for comedy show Khatta Meetha. He has also recorded voices for commercials and Hindi dubbed movies. He is also a member of AVA India, which is an association group for Indian actors and voice artists. He is known for dubbing for Sebastian Stan as Bucky Barnes / Winter Soldier in Marvel Cinematic Universe films in Hindi.

== Dubbing roles ==
=== Live action television series ===
Title	Actor	Character	Dub Language	Original Language	Episodes	Original airdate	Dub airdate	Notes
Power Rangers Dino Thunder	Latham Gaines	Dr.Anton Mercer	Hindi	English	17	February 14 - November 20, 2004		Aired on Jetix then Disney XD and Nickelodeon Sonic.
Lucifer	Tom Welling	Lieutenant Marcus Pierce / Cain	Hindi	English	24	October 2, 2017 - May 14, 2018		Aired on and streaming on Netflix India.
The Falcon and the Winter Soldier	Sebastian Stan	Bucky Barnes / Winter Soldier	Hindi	English	6	March 19 – April 23, 2021	March 19 – April 23, 2021	Aired on and streaming on Disney Plus Hotstar.
The Sandman	Boyd Holbrook	Corinthian	Hindi	English	10	August 5, 2022		Aired and streaming on Netflix India.
Transformers: War for Cybertron Trilogy	Bill Rogers	Wheeljack	Hindi	English	18(voiced 16)	July 30, 2020 – July 29, 2021	July 30, 2020 – July 29, 2021	Aired and streaming on Netflix India.

=== Live action films ===
==== Hollywood films ====
Film title	Actor	Character	Dub Language	Original Language	Original Year release	Dub Year release	Notes
Charlie and the Chocolate Factory	Johnny Depp	Willy Wonka	Hindi	English	2005	2005	
The Chronicles of Narnia: Prince Caspian	Damián Alcázar	Lord Sopespian	Hindi	English	2008	2008	Manish's name was mentioned on the Hindi dub credits of the DVD release of the film.
The Chronicles of Narnia: The Voyage of the Dawn Treader	Unknown actor	Unknown character	Hindi	English	2010	2010	Manish's name was mentioned on the Hindi dub credits of the DVD release of the film, also containing the Tamil and Telugu credits.
Predators	Walton Goggins	Stans	Hindi	English	2010	2010	
Inferno	Ben Foster	Bertrand Zobrist	Hindi	English	2016	2016	
Tron: Legacy	Michael Sheen	Zuse / Castor	Hindi	English	2010	2010	
The Twilight Saga: New Moon	Taylor Lautner	Jacob Black	Hindi	English	2009	2009	
The Twilight Saga: Eclipse	Taylor Lautner	Jacob Black	Hindi	English	2010	2010	
The Twilight Saga: Breaking Dawn – Part 1	Taylor Lautner	Jacob Black	Hindi	English	2011	2011	
The Twilight Saga: Breaking Dawn – Part 2	Taylor Lautner	Jacob Black	Hindi	English	2012	2012	
The Finest Hours	Chris Pine	Bernard "Bernie" Webber	Hindi	English	2016	2016	
Kingsman: The Golden Circle	Channing Tatum	Tequila	Hindi	English	2017	2017	
Captain America: The First Avenger	Sebastian Stan	James Buchanan "Bucky" Barnes	Hindi	English	2011	2011	
Captain America: The Winter Soldier	Sebastian Stan	Bucky Barnes / Winter Soldier	Hindi	English	2014	2014	
Captain America: Civil War	Sebastian Stan	Bucky Barnes / Winter Soldier	Hindi	English	2016	2016	
Black Panther	Sebastian Stan	Bucky Barnes / Winter Soldier	Hindi	English	2018	2018	The character had an uncredited cameo
Avengers: Infinity War	Sebastian Stan	Bucky Barnes / Winter Soldier	Hindi	English	2018	2018	
Avengers: Endgame	Sebastian Stan	Bucky Barnes / Winter Soldier	Hindi	English	2019	2019	
Mission: Impossible – Fallout	Wes Bentley	Erik	Hindi	English	2018	2018	
Triple Frontier	Ben Affleck	Tom "Redfly" Davis	Hindi	English	2019	2019	
Provoked	Unknown Actor	Chris Jones	Hindi	English	2006	2006	

==== South Indian films ====
Film title	Actor	Character	Dub Language	Original Language	Original Year release	Dub Year release	Notes
Jagame Thandhiram	Baba Bhaskar	Theerthamalai	Hindi	Tamil	2021	2021	

=== Animated films ===
Film title	Original voice	Character	Dub Language	Original Language	Original Year release	Dub Year release	Notes
Lady and the Tramp	Lee Millar	Jim Dear	Hindi	English	1955		
Ferdinand	John Cena	Ferdinand	Hindi	English	2017	2017	

== Awards ==
- Apsara best actor award
- Indian Telly Awards 2012 best actor in lead role jury award

== See also ==
- Dubbing (filmmaking)
- List of Indian dubbing artists
