= Ankit Arora =

Indian television actor

- Born: 23 February 1984 (age 41); Nainital, Uttarakhand
- Occupation: Actor
- Years active: 2008–present
- Notable work: Chakravartin Ashoka Samrat

Ankit Arora (born 23 February 1984) is an Indian television actor. He is best known for playing Lakshman on Ramayan and Rukn'ud'din on Razia Sultan. He played the adult version of Yuvraj Shushim Maurya in Chakravartin Ashoka Samrat.

== Filmography ==
=== Television ===
Year	Title	Role	Notes
2008	Ramayan	Lakshmana	
2009–2010	Jyoti	Vikrant Sisodia	
2010	Star One Horror Nights	Shaurya	Episode 7 and 80
2011–2012	Beend Banoongaa Ghodi Chadhunga	Chandan	
2012–2013	Phir Subha Hogi	Thakur Digvijay Singh	
2013	Humne Li Hai... Shapath	Varun	
2013–2014	Ek Ghar Banaunga	Abhishek Ravikant Garg	
2014	Dharmakshetra	Arjun	
2015	Razia Sultan	Rukn-ud-din Firuz	
2016	Chakravartin Ashoka Samrat	Susima	
2017	Prem Ya Paheli – Chandrakanta	Crown Prince Shivdutt	
2017	Badho Bahu	Balwinder Singh	
2018	Prithvi Vallabh - Itihaas Bhi, Rahasya Bhi	Vikramjeet	
2018	Kaun Hai?	Raghavendra Singh Rana	Episode 6
2018	Laal Ishq	Laxman	Episode 192
2018	Fear Files	Imtiaz	Episode 4
2019	Kesari Nandan	Zorawar Singh	
2019	Phir Laut Aayi Naagin	Naagarjun	Cameo
2020	Yeshu	Shaitaan	
2021	Mauka-E-Vardaat	Senior Inspector Rishiraj Pandey (Episode 77)	Episodic Role
2024–2025	Ghum Hai Kisikey Pyaar Meiin	Arsh Gujral	

=== Film ===
Year	Title	Role
2016	Sanam Re	Doctor
2017	Sweetiee Weds NRI	Rasiklal Mehta
