= Sooraj Thapar =

Indian television actor

- Born: Mumbai, Maharashtra, India
- Occupation: Television Actor
- Years active: 1989–present
- Spouse(s): Roma Navani (m. 2003; div. 2006) Deepti Dhyani (m. 2012)
- Children: 2

Sooraj Thapar is an Indian television actor.

== Filmography ==
Year	Film	Role
1992	Jo Jeeta Wohi Sikandar	Shekhar's Friend
2018	Vodka Diaries	Hotel Manager

== Television ==
Year	Serial	Role	Channel
	Gumrah		Zee TV
1989–1991	Udaan		DD National
1993	Zee Horror Show		Zee TV
1994	Ajnabi		DD National
1994–1998	Daraar		Zee TV
1997	Saturday Suspense - Adhoora Abhinay	Episode 24	Zee TV
2000–2003	Gharwali Uparwali	Ravi's Friend	Star Plus
2003	Kabhie Kabhie - Haque-Kashish	Episode 4	Zee TV
2003	Kabhie Kabhie - Mamta	Episode 15	Zee TV
2003–2004	Jassi Jaissi Koi Nahin	Charles	Sony Entertainment Television
2003–2006	Shararat	Amar Prem	Star Plus
2004	Devi	Agnivesh	Sony Entertainment Television
2004	Chaudah Phere		Doordarshan
2006	Pyaar Ke Do Naam: Ek Raadha, Ek Shyaam	Mr. Agarwal	Star Plus
2007–2008	Kuchh Is Tara	Aditya Nanda	Sony Entertainment Television
2007–2009	Kayamath	Pranay Shergill	Star Plus
2010–2012	Sasural Genda Phool	Alok Kashyap	Star Plus
2011–2012	Chandragupta Maurya	Samrat Dhananand	NDTV Imagine
2012	Chhal — Sheh Aur Maat	Dushyant Singh	Colors TV
2012	Bhai Bhaiya Aur Brother	Anil Patel	SAB TV
2013	Bani – Ishq Da Kalma	Nirvail Gill	Colors TV
2013–2014	Ekk Nayi Pehchaan	Suresh Modi	Sony Entertainment Television
2015	Razia Sultan	Shamsuddin Iltutmish	&TV
2015	Maha Kumbh: Ek Rahasaya, Ek Kahani	Vibhishana	Life OK
2016–2017	Ek Rishta Saajhedari Ka	Diwakar Sethia	Sony Entertainment Television
2017–2018	Hum Paanch Phir Se	Anand Mathur	Big Magic
2018	Tenali Rama	Maharaj Rudradev	SAB TV
2018–2019	Vikram Betaal Ki Rahasya Gatha	Bhadrakaal	And TV
2019	Paramavatar Shri Krishna	Maharaj Shakuni	And TV
2019–2020	Ishaaron Ishaaron Mein	Shiv Sharma	Sony Entertainment Television
2020	Golmaal Aspatal	Jeevan	DD National
2020	Akbar Ka Bal Birbal	Kamran	Star Bharat
2020–2021	Shaurya Aur Anokhi Ki Kahani	Tej Sabharwal	Star Plus
2021–2022	Sasural Genda Phool 2	Alok Kashyap	Star Bharat
2021–2023	Meet: Badlegi Duniya Ki Reet	Rajvardhan Ahlawat	Zee TV
