= Devachandra =

Jain scholar who lived in 19th century AD and wrote Rajavali-Katha

- Occupation: Scholar
- Works: Rajavali-Katha

Devachandra was a Jain scholar who lived in 19th century and wrote Rajavali-Katha.

== Works ==
Devachandra composed Rajavali-Katha which mentions Mauryan rulers and their reigns.

== Sources ==
- Daniélou, Alain (2003), A Brief History of India, Inner Traditions / Bear & Co, ISBN 978-1-59477-794-3
- Granoff, Phyllis, ed. (1993), "The Minister Cāṇakya, from the Pariśiṣtaparvan of Hemacandra", The Clever Adulteress and Other Stories: A Treasury of Jaina Literature, translated by Rosalind Lefeber, Motilal Banarsidass, ISBN 9788120811508
- Rice, B. Lewis (1889), Epigraphia Carnatica, Volume II: Inscriptions and Sravana Belgola, Bangalore: Mysore Government Central Press
