= Mahapadma Nanda =

4th-century BCE Nanda emperor

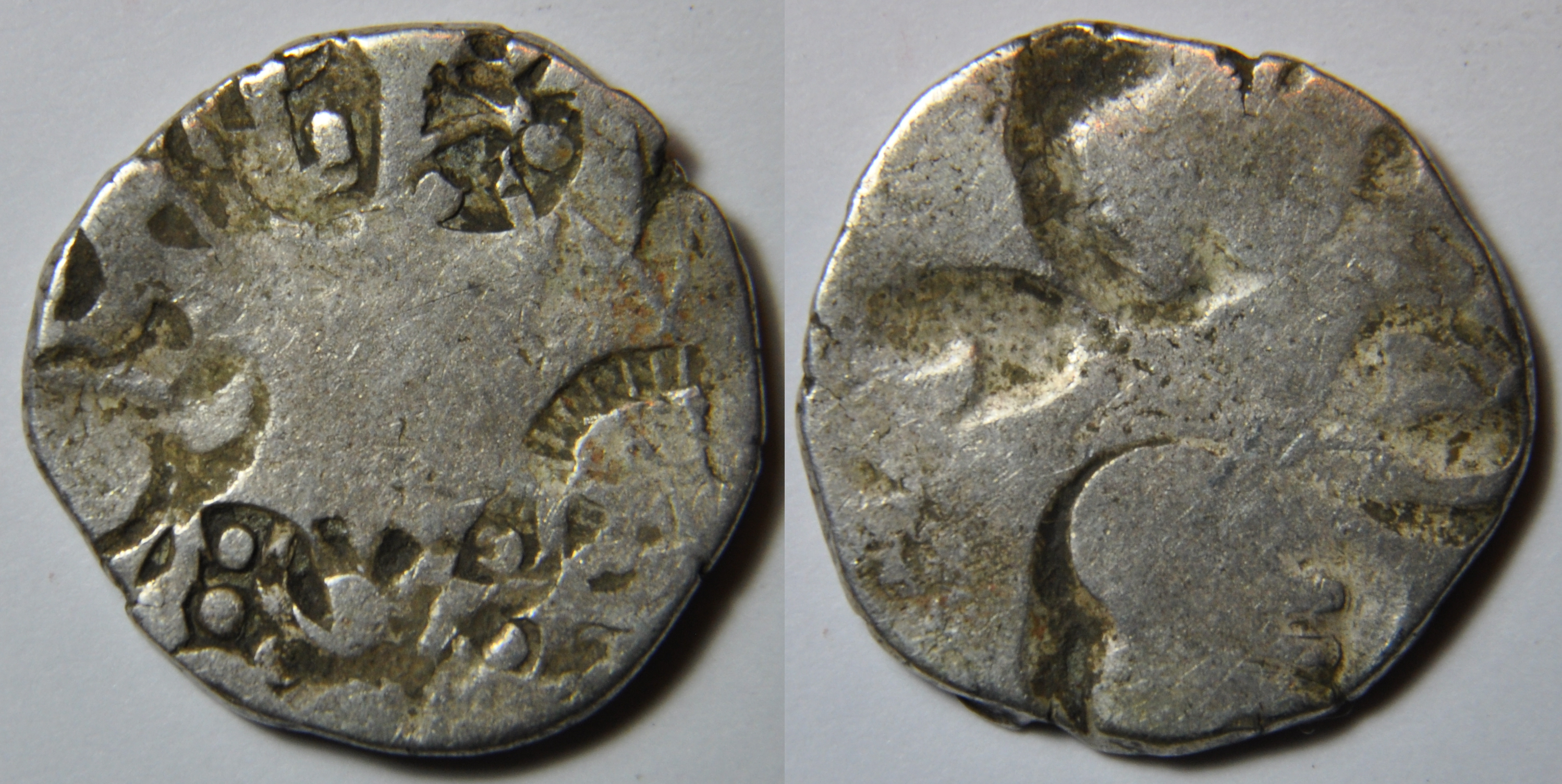
- A silver coin of 1 karshapana of King Mahapadma Nanda or his sons 4th century BCE

King of Magadha
- Reign: c. mid 4th century BCE
- Predecessor: Mahanandin
- Successor: Dhana Nanda (or Panduka)
- Dynasty: Nanda
- Father: Mahanandin

Mahapadma Nanda (Sanskrit: महापद्मानन्द; IAST: mahāpadmānanda, c. mid-4th century BCE), according to the Puranas, was the first Nanda king of Magadha.

The Puranas describe him as a son of the last Shaishunaga king Mahanandin and a Shudra woman. These texts credit him with extensive conquests that expanded the empire far beyond the Magadha region. The different Puranas give the length of his reign as 27 or 88 years, and state that his eight sons ruled in succession after him.

Buddhist texts don't mention him, and instead name the first Nanda ruler as robber-turned king Ugrasena, who was succeeded by his eight brothers, the last of whom was Dhana Nanda.

== Reign ==
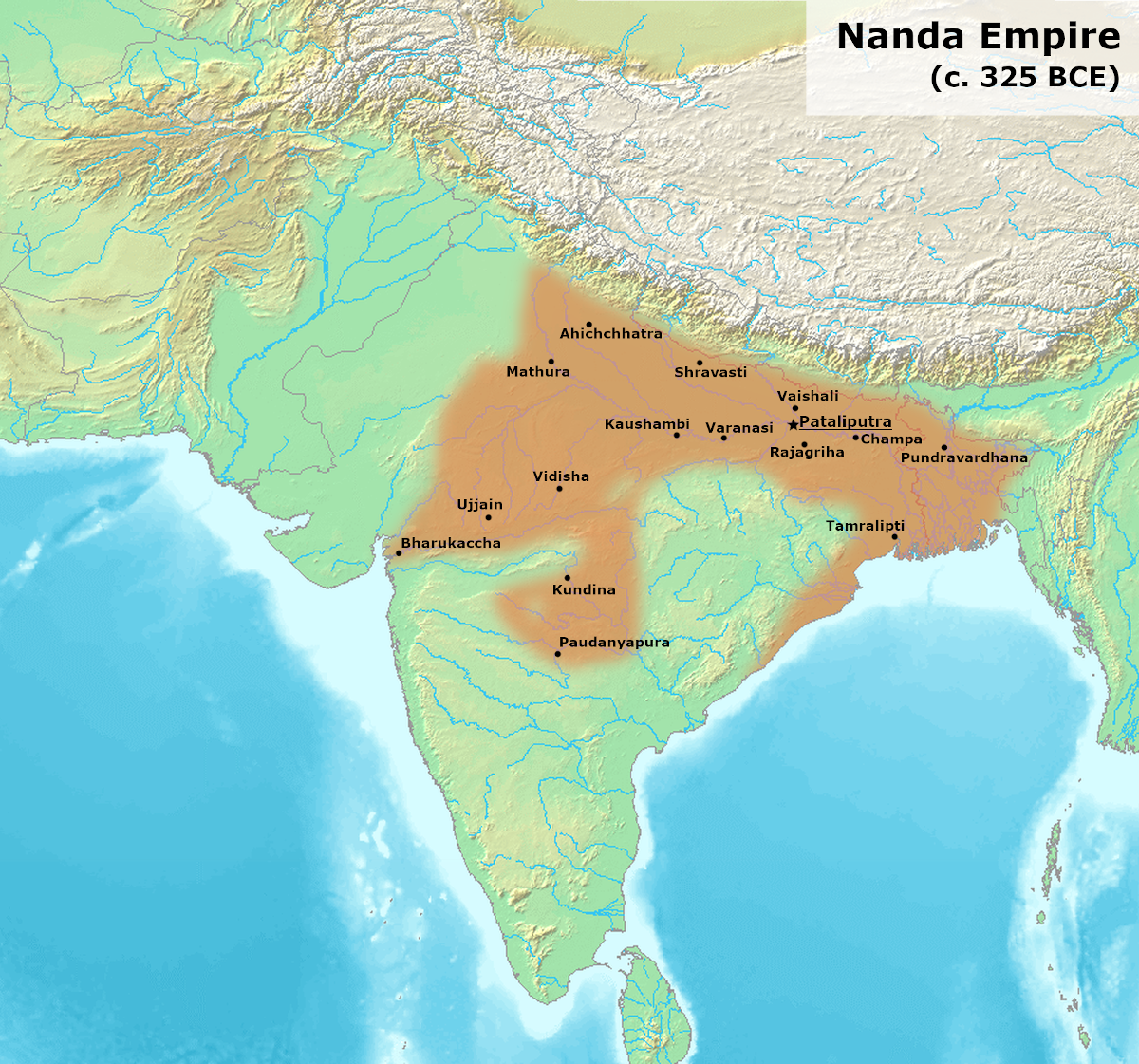
Estimate of the Nanda Empire's extent, c. 325 BCE

According to the Puranas, Mahapadma or Mahapadma-pati (literally, "lord of the great lotus") was the first Nanda king. He was the son of the last Shaishunaga king Mahanandin and a Shudra woman.

The Puranas describe him as ekarat (sole sovereign) and sarva-kshatrantaka (destroyer of all the Kshatriyas). The Kshastriyas (warriors and rulers) said to have been exterminated by Mahapadma include Maithalas, Kasheyas, Ikshvakus, Panchalas, Shurasenas, Kurus, Haihayas, Vitihotras, Kalingas, and Ashmakas.

== Period ==
Matsya Purana assigns Mahapadma an incredibly long reign of 88 years, while the contemporary text Vayu Purana mentions the length of his reign as only 28 years. The Puranas further state that Mahapadma's eight sons ruled in succession after him for a total of 12 years, but name only one of these sons: Sukalpa.

Various estimates of the first Nanda emperor's coronation:

- Indologist F. E. Pargiter: 382 BCE
- Historian R. K. Mukherjee: 364 BCE
- Historian H. C. Raychaudhuri: c. 345 BCE

The beginning of Nanda reign is also assigned as early as 5th century BCE.

== Other descriptions of the first Nanda king ==
According to the Buddhist texts, the first Nanda king was Ugrasena, not Mahapadma. According to one theory, Ugrasena was probably another name of Mahapadma. Unlike the Puranas, which assign mixed royal-Shudra ancestry to Mahapadma, the Buddhist texts describe Ugrasena as of "unknown lineage". According to the Mahavamsa-tika, Ugrasena was a native of the frontier region: he was captured by a gang of robbers, and later became their leader. Unlike the Puranas, the Buddhist texts describe the next eight kings as brothers - not sons - of the first Nanda king. Also, according to the Buddhist tradition, the Nandas ruled for a total of 22 years. The last of these kings was Dhana Nanda.

The Greco-Roman sources call the Nanda king ruling at the time of Alexander's invasion "Agrammes", which is possibly a corruption of the Sanskrit term "Augraseniya" (literally, "son or descendant of Ugrasena").

According to the Jain texts such as Parishishtaparvan and Avashyaka sutra, which do not mention the name "Mahapadma" either, the Nanda king was the son of a courtesan by a barber. They state that Nanda succeeded Udayin after his death from a rival king. They further state Kalpaka, a non-violent Jain, as his chief-minister, who is believed to have sacrificed his life for peace.

The Greco-Roman sources suggest that the founder of the Nanda dynasty was a barber, who usurped the throne from the last king of the preceding dynasty. Roman historian Curtius (1st century CE) states that according to Porus, this barber became the former queen's paramour thanks to his attractive looks, treacherously assassinated the then king, usurped the supreme authority by pretending to act as a guardian for the then princes, and later killed the princes. The Nanda king who was the contemporary of Porus and Alexander was the son of this barber.
