= Vitashoka =

Prince of Magadha
- Born: 3rd century BCE
- Dynasty: Maurya
- Father: Bindusara
- Mother: Subhadrangi
- Religion: Jainism

Vitashoka or Tissa (born 3rd-century BCE) was a prince of the Maurya Empire as the only full-brother of Ashoka, and the only brother left alive by Ashoka. According to Divyavadana, he was a follower of Jainism and used to criticize the Buddhist monks for living a comfortable life. He was made to sit on the throne by the courtiers. Vitashoka became a monk and practised austerities rigorously.

In The Series Bharat Ek Khoj Vitashoka/Tissa was portrayed by Lucky Ali

== Name ==
Vitashoka is referred to as Tissa (or Tisya) in Sri Lankan texts. Theragatha commentary regards Tissa and Vitashoka as different individuals. Other sources call him Vigatāshoka, Sudatta, or Sugatra. The Mahavamsa later names him as Ekavihārika.

== In the Legends ==
Fifth century legendary text Ashokavadana narrates a story of someone in Pundravardhana and then again at Pataliputra who drew a picture of the Buddha bowing before Mahavira. As a punishment, Ashoka ordered the Jain monks to be put to death and declared a reward for killing of Jains. Someone captured Vitashoka taking him to be a Jain. He was taken to Ashoka. After identifying that it was his own brother, Ashoka stopped giving orders for executions. However, according to the more authentic works based on Ashoka's life, Vitashoka's fate remains unknown after Ashoka became emperor. Some scholars suggested that Vitashoka must have become a general or a minister of Ashoka. According to the Dipavamsa, it is stated that Ashoka killed 100 brothers. In contrast, the Mahavamsa records that Ashoka killed 99 brothers. In Tibbetan Buddhist tradition, Taranatha’s 'History of Buddhism in India' state that Ashoka killed 6 brothers. On the other hand, the Buddhist legend Ashokavadana mentions the killing of only one brother, Susima, without any reference to other brothers being killed. These variations highlight the discrepancies and uncertainties that arises in interpreting historical events by sectarian Buddhist texts. Ashoka's Rock Edict V mentions his brothers and sisters, indicating they were alive during his reign and held noble positions. This contradicts Buddhist legends, which claim he killed all his brothers except one. The edict suggests that such accounts are likely exaggerated.
