= Mother of Ashoka =

Chief queen of Bindusara

Dharma or Subhadrangi
- Janapada-kalyani

Empress Consort of Maurya Empire
- Predecessor: Durdhara
- Successor: Asandhimitra
- Spouse: Bindusara
- Issue: Ashoka; Vitashoka (according to Ashokavadana) or Tissa (according to Mahavamsa)
- Dynasty: Maurya (by marriage)
- Father: A Brahmin of Champa (according to Ashokavadana)
- Religion: Hinduism Historic Vedic religion

The information about the mother of Ashoka (c. 3rd century BCE), the 3rd Mauryan emperor of ancient India, varies between different sources. Ashoka's own inscriptions and the main texts that provide information about his life (such as Ashokavadana and Mahavamsa) do not name his mother. The Asokavadanamala names her Subhadrangi, while Vamsatthapakasini calls her Dharma (Pali: Dhamma). Different texts variously describe her as a Brahmin or a Kshatriya.

== Names ==
Ashoka's own inscriptions do not mention his parents. The various Buddhist texts provide different names or epithets for Ashoka's mother:

- Subhadrangi, in Asokavadanamala, a text composed sometime after mid-11th century; not to be confused with Ashokavadana within Divyavadana
- Dharma (Pali: Dhamma), in Vamsatthapakasini or Mahavamsa-tika, a 10th-century commentary on Mahavamsa
- Janapada-kalyani, in a Divyavadana legend; according to scholar Ananda W. P. Guruge, this is not a name, but an epithet.

== Ancestry ==
Ashokavadana, which does not mention Ashoka's mother by name, states that she was the daughter of a Brahmin from Champa city near the Mauryan capital Pataliputra.

According to the Mahavamsa-tika, Ashoka's mother Dhamma belonged to the Moriya Kshatriya clan.

According to the 2nd-century historian Appian, Ashoka's grandfather Chandragupta entered into a marital alliance with the Greek king Seleucus I Nicator, which has led to speculation that Ashoka's father Bindusara (or Chandragupta himself) married a Greek princess. However, there is no evidence that Ashoka's mother (or grandmother) was Greek, and the idea has been dismissed by most historians.

== Legends in Buddhist texts ==
=== Marriage to Bindusara ===
According to the Ashokavadana, the mother of Ashoka, name unknown, was the daughter of a Brahmin from the Champa. As a young woman, she was extremely beautiful, and some fortune-tellers predicted that she would marry a king. They also prophesied that she would bear two sons, one of whom will become a chakravartin (universal) emperor, while the other would be religiously-inclined. Accordingly, her father took her to Pataliputra, and offered her in marriage to Emperor Bindusara.

Bindusara considered the woman an auspicious celestial maiden, and inducted her into his palace. The emperor's concubines, who were jealous of her beauty, did not let her sleep with the emperor, and instead trained her as a barber. She soon became an expert barber, and whenever she groomed the emperor's hair and beard, the emperor would become relaxed and fall asleep. Pleased with her, the emperor promised to grant her one wish, to which she asked the emperor to have intercourse with her. The emperor stated that he was a Kshatriya (member of the warrior class), and would not sleep with a low-class barber girl. The girl explained that she was the daughter of a Brahmin (a member of the high priestly class), and had been made a barber by the other women in the palace. The emperor then told her not to work as a barber, and made her his chief empress.

=== Pregnancy and childbirth ===
According to the Mahavamsa-tika, when Empress Dhamma was pregnant with Ashoka, she had unusual cravings. For example, she once said that she wanted to "trample on the moon and the sun to play with the stars and to eat up the forests". Bindusara asked the Brahmins in his court to explain the meaning of these cravings, but they were unable to do so. Janasena, an Ājīvika ascetic known to the empress's family, was able to interpret the meaning of her cravings, and predicted that her son would conquer and rule over entire India (Jambudvipa). He also predicted that the son would destroy 96 heretical sects, promote Buddhism, and kill his brothers for displeasing him (the text later states that Ashoka killed 99 out of his 100 brothers).

According to the Ashokavadana, when she gave birth to her first child, the empress named the baby Ashoka, because she had become "without sorrow" (a-shoka) when he was born. Later, she gave birth to a second son. She named the child Vitashoka, because her sorrow had ceased (vigate-shoke) when he was born.

=== Pingala-vatsajiva's prediction ===
Ashokavadana states that Bindusara disliked Ashoka because of his rough skin. One day, Bindusara asked the Ajivika ascetic Pingala-vatsajiva to examine which of his sons was worthy of being his successor. Ashoka did not want to go to for the examination, as his father disliked him. However, his mother convinced him to be there with other princes. Pingala-vatsajiva realized that Ashoka would be the next emperor, but did not directly tell this to Bindusara for fear of displeasing the emperor. Later, he told Ashoka's mother that her son would be the next emperor, and on her advice, left the empire to avoid Bindusara's wrath.

== In popular culture ==
- Subhadrangi's/Dharma role was played by Pallavi Subhash Shirke in the 2015 TV series, Chakravartin Ashoka Samrat
- She was portrayed by Subhashini Ali in the 2001 film Aśoka.
- She was portrayed by Prerna Sharma in the 2016 TV Chandra Nandini
