= Parishishtaparvan =

12th-century Sanskrit epic poem

The Parishishtaparvan (IAST: Pariśiṣṭaparvan) also known as the Sthaviravalicharitra (IAST: Sthavirāvalīcaritra) is a 12th-century Sanskrit mahakavya by Hemachandra which details the histories of the earliest Jain teachers. The poem comprises 3,460 verse couplets divided into 13 cantos of unequal length and is also notable for providing information on the political history of ancient India.

The Trishashtishalakapurushacharitra (IAST: Triṣaṣṭiśalākāpuruṣacaritra; The Lives of the Sixty-three Illustrious People), an epic Sanskrit poem on the key figures in Jainism, was composed by Hemachandra at the request of the Chaulukya king, Kumarapala. The Sthaviravalicharitra (The Lives of the Jain Elders) is considered a self-contained sequel to this work and is consequently referred to as the Parishishtaparvan or The Appendix.

The period largely covered in the poem corresponds to c. 480 – c. 200 BCE and follows the growth of the kingdom of Magadha and the establishment of the Maurya Empire. According to Hemachandra, the sequence of rulers in the times of the Jains discussed was: Shrenika, Kunika, Udayin, the nine Nandas, Chandragupta Maurya, Ashoka, and Samprati. Hemachandra also speaks of Samprati being instrumental in the spread of Jainism further south.

The Parishishtaparvan was Hemachandra's last major work. Hemachandra also wrote Sanskrit Prakrit text “Kumarpalaa Charita”.

== Contents ==
The text talks about the incorrect strategy of Chanakya of attacking Dhana Nanda's capital. It further narrates that he leaned from this incidence and changed strategy by convincing peripheral kingdoms starting with Parvataka of Himavatkuta.

== Edition ==
- Sthaviravalicarita or Pariśiṣṭaparvan, being an Appendix of the Triṣaṣṭi-śālākāpuruṣacarita by Hemacandra (1932) by Hermann Jacobi

== Translation ==
- The Lives of the Jain Elders (1998) by R.C.C. Fynes
