= Mreenal Deshraj =

Indian actress

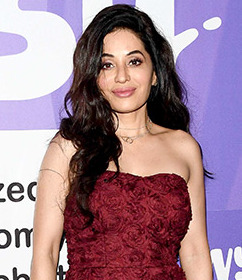
- Mreenal during an event
- Born: 2 August 1978; Nagpur, Maharashtra
- Occupation: Actress
- Years active: 2000-2019
- Spouse: Ashim Matthan (m. 2022)

Mreenal Deshraj (born 2 August 1978) is an Indian actress who works primarily in Hindi films and television. She is known for the serials Naagin and Ishqbaaaz.

== Early life ==
Mreenal graduated in Fashion Designing from National Institute of Fashion Technology. Mreenal married Ashim Matthan on 5 July 2022.

== Career ==
Mreenal started her career as an actor with TV Serial Kahin To Hoga. In which she played the role of Shipra Arora. After that she appeared in Kabhi Aaye Na Judaai, Ek Ladki Anjaani Si (TV series) and Raat Hone Ko Hai. In 2006, she started her film career with Tathastu and played a supporting role in the film Vivah.

== Television ==
Year	Serial	Role	Notes
2003	Kahiin to Hoga	Shipra Arora	Lead Role
2003	Kabhi Aaye Na Judaai		Supporting Cast
2004	Pancham (TV series)	Lekha	Lead Role
2005	Ek Ladki Anjaani Si (TV series)		Supporting Cast
2008	Sujata (TV series)	Sejal	Lead Role
2007-2009	Doli Saja Ke	Padmini	Lead Antagonist
2009	Ssshhhh...Koi Hai	Kajri Varun Pratap Singh	Episodic Role
2011	Ek Nayi Chhoti Si Zindagi	Revati	Lead Antagonist
2013	Bharat Ka Veer Putra – Maharana Pratap	Rani Uma	Lead Antagonist
2013-2014	Adaalat	Raksha and Mishka	Episodic Role
2016-2017	Ishqbaaaz	Jahnvi Malhotra	Supporting Lead
2017	Dil Boley Oberoi	Jhanvi	Supporting Lead
2019	Naagin	Rohini	Lead Antagonist

== Films ==
Year	Title	Role	Notes	Ref.
2006	Tathastu		Supporting Role	
2006	Vivah	Staff Member	Supporting Role	
2009	Runway (2009 film)		Supporting Role	
