= Suna Panjuri =

1995 Indian-Odia language film

- Poster
- Directed by: Rabi Kinagi
- Written by: Shirsananda Das Kanungo
- Screenplay by: Rabi Kinagi
- Story by: Shankar Kinagi
- Produced by: Subas Rout; Somya Ranjan Raut
- Starring: Bijay Mohanty; Siddhant Mahapatra; Indira Krishnan; Debu Bose; Namrta Das; Hara Patnaik
- Cinematography: Rajan Kinagi; Samba Shiva Rao
- Edited by: Vishwanath Rao
- Music by: Amarendra Mohanty
- Production company: Shree Ganesh Productions
- Distributed by: Maruti Films International
- Release date: 1995
- Running time: 165 minutes
- Country: India
- Language: Odia

Suna Panjuri is a 1995 Indian Odia-language romantic drama film directed by Ravi Kinnagi. A remake of Bengali film Amar Sangee, it stars Bijay Mohanty, Siddhant Mahapatra, Indira Krishnan and Debu Bose in lead roles, although there were no credits. All the songs composed by Amarendra Mohanty were superhits in 1995, especially "Puchuki Gali" sung by Sonu Nigam.

== Cast ==
- Bijay Mohanty as Debendra
- Siddhant Mahapatra as Ajay
- Indira Krishnan as Puja
- Debu Bose as Doctor Ramakant
- Namrata Das
- Hara Patnaik as Binod
- Sasmita Pradhan as Rupa
- Premanjana as Nityanda Das
- Braja Singh as Servant
- Debu Bramha as Servant
- Deb Dulal Banarjee as Police Inspector
- Bichitrananda Mahanty
- Pradip Singh
- Kali Prasad Patnaik
- Rabi Nanda
- Sweta
- Jayiram Samal (guest appearance)
- Bairagi (special appearance in the song "Puchuki Gali")

== Songs ==
The music was composed by Amarendra Mohanty.

1. "Moro Mana Udijayere" - Kavitha Krishnamurthy, Prasenjit Mohanty
2. "Sunara Chadei" - Sonu Nigam, Kavita Krishnamurthy
3. "Puchuki Gali" - Sonu Nigam
4. "Tumaku Pai Mu" - Kavita Krishnamurthy, Sonu Nigam
5. "Soija Mama" - Suresh Wadkar

== Awards ==
1995 Odissa Cine Critic Awards
