= Sehdev =

Sehdev is an Indian surname. Notable people with the surname include:

- Paramdeep Sehdev (born 1971), better known as Bobby Friction, British DJ, television presenter, and radio presenter
- Gireesh Sahdev, Indian actor
- Piyush Sahdev, Indian actor
