= I Don't Luv U =

- Directed by: Amit Kasaria
- Written by: Amit Kasaria
- Produced by: Dr. Anil Kumar Sharma; Lalit Kumar
- Starring: Chetna Pande as Aayra; Shiv Narayanan as Sambhav; Ruslaan Mumtaz as Yuvan; Shankar Mahawar as Libarian; Alok Kumar as Roy; Jass Bhatia as Lovely
- Cinematography: Saurav Vishwakarma
- Edited by: Suvir Nath
- Music by: Aman-Benson; Amit Kasaria
- Production company: Amrapali Media Vision
- Release date: 17 May 2013 (India)
- Running time: 2h 10m
- Country: India
- Language: Hindi
- Budget: ₹ 2,00,00,000 $ 210 558,60 € 188 691,82
- Box office: ₹ 70,00,000 $ 73 695,51 € 66 045,88

I Don't Luv U is a 2013 Indian Hindi-language romantic drama film, starring Ruslaan Mumtaz and Chetna Pande in the lead roles. The film was produced by Dr. Anil Kumar Sharma and written and directed by Amit Kasaria under the banner of Amrapali Media Vision. The film was released on 17 May 2013 in India.

== Plot ==
Yuvaan Kapoor (Ruslaan Mumtaz), a 19-year-old college student, is rushed to the hospital after falling from a balcony. The police investigator attending the scene recognizes Yuvaan as the same student who was involved in a college MMS sex scandal. Suspacting suicide, the inspector finds a diary at the scene and begins to read it.

The diary reveals the events leading up to the tragedy. Yuvaan meets Aayra Saigal (Chetna Pande) and develops romantic feelings for her. Although initially rejected, Yvaan's persistent kindness eventually wins Aarya over and the two become close friends before falling in love.Their friendship deepens, and they find that they cannot be away from each other. Aayra realizes that she loves Yuvaan and writes this in her diary. One day, while visiting Aayra at her home, Yuvaan accidentally leaves his phone recording while they hugg and hold each other. Yuvaan kisses Aayra and unzips her dress. Aayra becomes scared and starts to cry and tells him to stop. Yuvaan zips her dress back up and reconcile with her.

The inspector reads this and is shocked to find out the truth since that is not how the story was portrayed in the media and amongst the public. He goes to the hospital and attempts to question Yuvaan, but he is in critical condition waiting for a surgery. The inspector questions Yuvaan's friend Amey, who explains that during a trip with friends, another friend named Lovely stole Yuvaan's phone. Shortly after the compromising video was leaked to the college and media, sparking a massive scandal and Yuvaan gets arrested. After he is released on bail, Yuvaan tries to minimize the damage caused to Aarya and remove her name from the incident, but it is too late. He decides to jump off the balcony with the diary. While the public sympathizes with Yuvaan's survival after a month of recovery, Aayra continues to face severe social ostracization.

When Yuvaan's injuries have healed, and he goes to meet Aayra. He tells her how much he loves her and asks for forgiveness. Aayra forgives him but also says that his apology won't bring her reputation back. She reveals that her family is moving abroad to escape the scandal and that she may never see him again.

Sometime later, Yuvaan is being interviewed by a news channel. The news anchor asks him if Aayra has forgiven him since the entire country now sympathizes with him. He says that he does not know if she has forgiven him, but all he does know is that he still loves her. Later on, it is revealed that Aayra's parents have left India, but she chose to stay behind to reunite with Yuvaan.

== Cast ==
- Chetna Pande as Aayra Sehgal
- Ruslaan Mumtaz as Yuvaan Kapoor
- Murali Sharma Police Inspector
- Ragesh Asthana as Yuvaan's father
- Jass Bhatia as Lovely
- Ravi Gosain
- Ravi Khemu as Aayra's father
- Deepraj Rana
- Paramjyot Singh

== Soundtrack ==
I Don't Luv U

Soundtrack album by Aman & Benson
- Released: 22 April 2013
- Genre: Feature film soundtrack
- Length: 37:46
- Language: Hindi
- Label: Amrapali Media Vision

The soundtrack album has ten songs composed by the music duo Aman Pant - Benson Baby. Amit Kasaria wrote and composed the song "Ishq Ki", which was sung by Mika Singh.

=== Track listings ===
No.	Title	Singer(s)	Duration
1	"I Don't Luv U"	Neuman Pinto, Monali Thakur	4:50
2	"Ishq Ki"	Mika Singh	3:13
3	"Mera Chhuta Guitar"	Shaan	3:46
4	"Mere Khuda"	Javed Ali	5:10
5	"Kuchh Hone Ko Hai"	Raman Mahadevan, Joi Barua	3:51
6	"Jaane Kaise Do I Luv U"	Linda M Johny	3:26
7	"Mohe Apne Hi"	Fareed Hasan	4:47
8	"Mission Tadofier"	Siraj Khan	1:11
9	"I Don't Luv U" (Club Version)	Neuman Pinto, Rob C, Monali Thakur	3:46
10	"Ishq Ki" (Club version)	Mika Singh	3:35

== Critical reception ==
The film received generally negative reviews from critics. The Times of India gave the film a rating of 2.5 out of 5 stars, stating that, "The film has a lot to offer, especially for youngsters but mentions of too many moralistic issues leave you frustrated." Gaurav Malani of The Economic Times awarted it 1.5 out of 5 stars, noting that, "The makers lack the sensibility and the sensitivity to handle an intricate issue like MMS and are rather myopic in their outlook." Mohar Basu of Koimoi gave the film a rating of 0.5 out of 5 stars, describing it as, "a film that doesn’t deserve to even release going by its non story, non script and non film aspects." Martin D'Souza of Glamsham gave the film a rating of 2 out of 5 stars, saying that, "At the heart of I DON'T LUV U lies a very relevant issue. But sadly, that's left for too late by which time you have been treated to some rather raw, amateurish scenes in college and teenage time pass on the campus." Tushar Joshi of DNA India gave the film a rating of 1 out of 5 stars, saying that, "I Don't Luv U is a futile exercise in using a MMS controversy as a tool to lure the audience into watching a half baked script, some cringe worthy scenes and performances that look like an audition gone bad."
