= Raman Mahadevan =

Indian playback singer (born 1978)

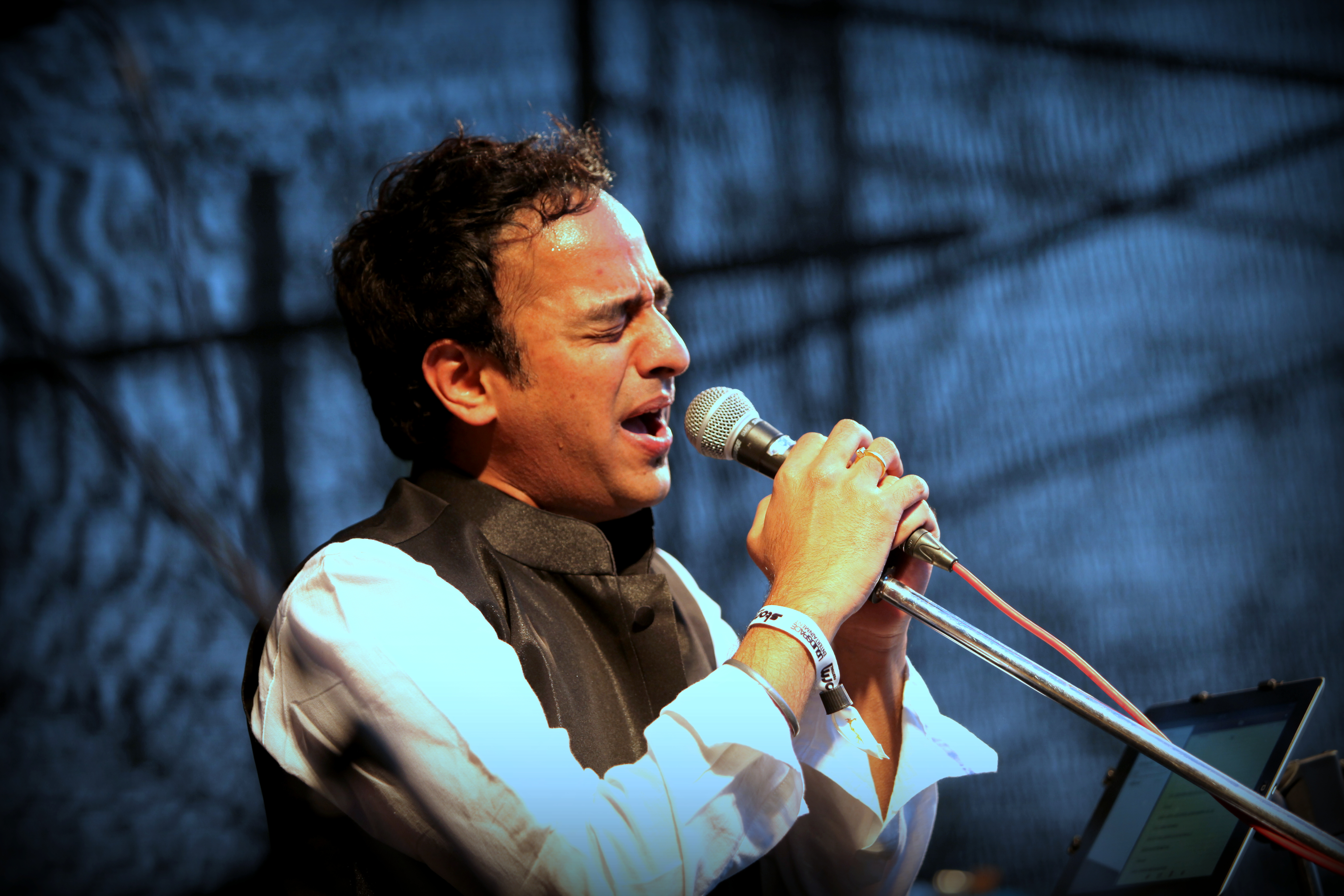

Background information
- Born: 15 April 1978 (age 48)
- Origin: Mumbai, Maharashtra, India
- Genres: Playback singer Jingles; Soundtracks
- Occupations: Singer/music composer
- Years active: 2003–present

Raman Mahadevan is an Indian playback singer, known for his Bollywood songs. He released an indipop album, Ramanasia, in 2007.

== Career ==
Mahadevan was born in Mumbai. After completing his studies at New Bombay High School and ICL college, Vashi, he worked for the IT and ITeS industry before taking up singing full-time. He learnt Carnatic music from guru Prasanna Warrier and later from Girija Shesu. He also learnt tabla from guru Palash Bordoloi.

He has sung songs for Hindi movies like Heyy Babyy, Johnny Gaddaar and Taare Zameen Par. He has also released his own music album Ramanasia in 2007 and was featured in the song Tere Liye, composed by Saikat-Shankar, released in June 2009.

== Personal life ==
Raman is not related to Shankar Mahadevan, with whom he performed at the cultural fest of NIT Calicut, Ragam 13 and in Yuva Dasara 2012 and 2014.

== Filmography ==
Year	Movie	Language	Song	Composer
2007	Heyy Babyy	Hindi	"Heyy Babyy"	Shankar–Ehsaan–Loy
2007	Johnny Gaddaar	Tamil/Telugu	"Johnny Gaddar"	Shankar–Ehsaan–Loy
2007	Taare Zameen Par; Vaal Natchathiram; Nela Meeda Tharalu	Hindi; Tamil; Telugu	"Kholo Kholo" "Thatti Thatti" "Vellu Vellu Veluvala"	Shankar–Ehsaan–Loy
2008	Rock On!!	Hindi	"Sinbad The Sailor"	Shankar–Ehsaan–Loy
2009	Khela	Hindi	"Laut Aaye"	21 Grams
2009	Konchem Ishtam Konchem Kashtam	Telugu	"Egire Egire"	Shankar–Ehsaan–Loy
2009	Wake Up Sid	Hindi	"Iktara"	Amit Trivedi
2010	Bale Pandiya	Tamil	"Aaradha Kobamillai -nominated for the Best Debut Singer Award at the Vijay TV Music Awards 2011 "	Devan Ekambaram
2010	Admissions Open	Hindi	"Aasman Ke Paar"	Amit Trivedi
2010	Kalshekar Aahet Ka?	Marathi	"Gadbad Sari Dhadpad"	Chinar-Mahesh
2010	Udaan	Hindi	"Motu Master"	Amit Trivedi
2010	Aisha	Hindi	"Behke Behke"	Amit Trivedi
2010	Walk Away	English	"Bonds Fell Apart"	Sagar Desai
2010	Walk Away	Hindi	"Woh Pal"	Sagar Desai
2011	No One Killed Jessica	Hindi	"Dua"	Amit Trivedi
2011	Davpech	Marathi	"Man Aaj Na Maajhe Rahile"	Rohan Pradhan
2011	Aarakshan	Hindi	"Mauka/Ik Chanas"	Shankar–Ehsaan–Loy
2011	Dhav Manya Dhav	Marathi	"Dhav Manya Dhav"	Chinar-Mahesh
2011	Muppozhudhum Un Karpanaigal	Tamil	"Oh Sunandha"	G. V. Prakash Kumar
2011	Krishnaveni Panjalai	Tamil	"Un Kangal"	NR Raghunandan
2012	Delhi Safari	Hindi	"Aao Re Pardesi"	Shankar–Ehsaan–Loy
2013	ABCD: Any Body Can Dance	Hindi	"Chandu Ki Girlfriend"	Sachin–Jigar
2013	I Don't Luv U	Hindi	"Kuchh Hone Ko Hain"	Aman-Benson
2013	Premsutra	Marathi	"Mutthi Madhe"	Susmit Limaye
2013	Premsutra	Marathi	"Halke Halke"	Susmit Limaye
2013	Premsutra	Marathi	"Me Bhirbhirta Vara"	Susmit Limaye
2014	Savaari 2	Kannada	"Simple Aaggidde"	Manikanth Kadri
2014	Happy New Year	Tamil, Telugu	"Indiawaale"	Vishal–Shekhar
2014	Happy New Year	Tamil, Telugu	"Chammiya Style"	Vishal–Shekhar
2015	Kaakan	Marathi	"Kaakan Reprise"	Ajay Singha Miko
2015	Katti Batti	Hindi	"Jaago Mohan Pyaare"	Shankar–Ehsaan–Loy
2015	The Perfect Girl	Hindi	"Khulne Lagi Zindagi"	Soumil, Siddharth
2016	Hai Apna Dil Toh Awara	Hindi	"Dil Ke Rahi"	Ajay Singha
2019	Halkaa	Hindi	"Bandeya"	Shankar–Ehsaan–Loy

== Albums ==
Year	Album	Language	Song	Composer
2006	Pralay,14	Hindi	"Saawariya"	Pralay feat. Amit Trivedi
2007	Ramanasia	Hindi	"Teri Talaash Hain, Badra, Gunche, Mat Todo Mujhe, Aasman Se Koi, Tu Jo Ik Pal Dede, Dard Dilaande, O Meri Jaan, Teri Talaash Hain(Reprise)"	Raman Mahadevan
2009	UWF Vol.1	Hindi	"Tere Liye" (Nominated for Promising New Talent at the GIMA Awards)	Saikat-Shankar
2009	Utkrosh	Hindi	"Pyaar Hi Rab Hain"	Pralay
2010	Someone Somewhere	Hindi	"Main Jisse Mila Hoon"	Nikhil Kamath
2013	In Raahon Mein	Hindi	"Gunjara Re"	Ajay Singha Miko
2013	Bollywood Unwind	Hindi	"Tu Hi Re"	Reproduced by Ajay Singha Miko, Originally Composed by AR Rahman
2015	Bollywood Unwind 2	Hindi	"Baahon Ke Darmiyaan"	Reproduced by Ajay Singha Miko, Originally Composed by Jatin–Lalit
2017	Raman & Jirka	Sanskrit	Chintamani	Raman Mahadevan & Jirka Mucha
2017	Raman & Jirka	Hindi	Tu	Raman Mahadevan & Jirka Mucha
2019	Raman & Jirka	Hindi	Dooba	Raman Mahadevan & Jirka Mucha
2022	Raman & Jirka	Hindi	Mere Auliya	Raman Mahadevan & Jirka Mucha

== AD/Jingles ==
Product	Composer	Singer
Pepsi	Amar Mangrulkar	Raman Mahadevan
Mirinda	Amar Mangrulkar	Raman Mahadevan
Lays	Anand Ranganath	Raman Mahadevan
Haywards	Amartya Rahut	Raman Mahadevan
Mumbai Indians Theme	Tapas Relia	Raman Mahadevan, Vijay Prakash, Rishikesh Kamerkar
Mumbai Indians Theme-2	Tapas Relia, track reproduced by Ehsaan-Loy	Raman Mahadevan, Kshitij Wagh, Rajiv Sundaresan, Shreekumar Va
Mumbai Indians Theme-3	Tapas Relia, track reproduced by Mikey McLeary	Raman Mahadevan
