= Chatur Singh Two Star =

- Theatrical release poster
- Directed by: Ajay Chandhok
- Written by: Muktsar Mandar
- Screenplay by: Rumi Jaffery
- Story by: Rumi Jaffery; Sai Kabir
- Produced by: Mohammad Aslam
- Starring: Sanjay Dutt; Ameesha Patel; Suresh Menon; Anupam Kher
- Cinematography: Rajeev Shrivastava
- Edited by: Nitin Rokade
- Music by: Sajid–Wajid
- Production companies: Lotus Motion Pictures; Movies & More
- Distributed by: Pen Studios
- Release date: 19 August 2011
- Running time: 150 minutes
- Country: India
- Language: Hindi
- Budget: ₹250 million (US$2.6 million)

Chatur Singh Two Star is a 2011 Indian Hindi-language action comedy film directed by Ajay Chandhok, starring Sanjay Dutt, Ameesha Patel and Suresh Menon in the lead roles. Produced by Mohammad Aslam and Parag Sanghvi. It was released on 19 August 2011. The film is based on the novel Chalaak Jasoos and the 2006 Hollywood film, The Pink Panther.

The film was a critical and commercial failure as it received negative reception from both critics and cinema-goers.

== Plot ==
Amateur cop Chatur Singh is sent on a special mission to South Africa to solve a high-profile case involving the murder of a politician and a cache of diamonds. But before he can redeem his career, he must deal with a bizarre cast, which include a mafia don, a taxi driver, a boss, and a damsel in distress.

== Cast ==
- Sanjay Dutt as Chatur Singh 2 Star / James Armani
- Ameesha Patel as Sonia Varma
- Suresh Menon as Purushutam Singh (Pappu Panther)
- Anupam Kher as Commissioner Rajpal Sinha / Dr Jhatka
- Vishwajeet Pradhan as DGP Kulkarni
- Satish Kaushik as Gullu Gulfam
- Shakti Kapoor as Don Chihuhua
- Gulshan Grover as Agriculture Minister Y.Y. Singh
- Sanjay Mishra as Lallan Kupleri
- Murli Sharma as Tony
- Rati Agnihotri as Savitri Y. Singh
- Indira Krishnan as Sonia's Sister
- Ganesh Yadav as Inspector Yadav

== Production ==
The film was announced in late 2007 with Sanjay Dutt cast for the role of Chatur Singh. During June 2008, filming began in India and the following schedule was filmed in Cape Town, South Africa during July and August in the same year. In 2009, some of the remaining portions were completed and the film moved to its post-production stage in early 2010.

The theatrical trailer of the film was released on 21 July 2011 online and also in cinemas with Singham (2011).

== Reception ==
=== Critical ===
Most critics were dismissive. Vandana Krishnan of Behindwoods rated it as 0.5 out of 5 and said "Chathur Singh 2 star is not even worth half a star." Rajeev Masand of CNN-IBN gave it one star out of five saying that it is "Strictly avoidable. Unless you're one for self-punishment." Saibal Chatterjee of NDTV gave it zero stars and said "This is a film that proffers madness without the slightest semblance of method. It's just as well that there are two stars in its title. It doesn't deserve any." Shubhra Gupta of The Indian Express gave the film one star concluding "There is no story in 'Chatur Singh, Two Star’. And the only story to 'Chatur Singh, Two Star’ seems to one of delusion : that the people involved in it, were making a film." Taran Adarsh of Bollywood Hungama awarded one and a half stars saying "Chatur Singh Two Star tries hard to make you laugh, but fails in its endeavour." Rediff.com gave it zero stars, too. Nupur Barua of fullhyd.com called it a sorry excuse of a movie, warning "you may get suicidal at the end of it".

=== Box office ===
Chatur Singh Two Star earned 30 million in its full theatrical run. The film grossed 130 million worldwide. It was declared a flop.

== Soundtrack ==
Chatur Singh Two Star

Soundtrack album by Sajid–Wajid
- Released: 7 August 2011
- Genre: Feature film soundtrack
- Label: Shemaroo Entertainment

The film's soundtrack is composed by Sajid–Wajid with lyrics penned by Jalees Sherwani, Shabbir Ahmed, Junaid Wasi, Asif Ali Baig. The soundtrack was released to YouTube's official channel on 29 July 2011.

=== Track listing ===
No.	Title	Singer(s)	Length
1.	"Chandni Chowk Se"	Sajid–Wajid, Hard Kaur	04:18
2.	"Ishqan Da Ishqan Da"	Sonu Nigam, Shweta Pandit	04:20
3.	"Jungle Ki Heerni Hoon"	Sunidhi Chauhan	04:40
4.	"Murga Anda Dega"	Sanjay Dutt, Suzanne D'Mello	04:35
5.	"Singh Singh Singh"	Sanjay Dutt, Wajid, Khurram Iqbal, Asif Ali Baig	04:10
6.	"Jungle Ki Heerni Hoon" (Remix)	Sunidhi Chauhan	04:30
7.	"Singh Singh Singh – Remix"	Sanjay Dutt, Wajid, Khurram Iqbal, Asif Ali Baig	04:20
