= Aaj Ka Ravan =

- DVD cover
- Directed by: Imran Khalid
- Written by: Tanveer Durrani (dialogues)
- Story by: Khalid
- Produced by: Surendra Srivastava
- Starring: Mithun Chakraborty
- Cinematography: Ashok Rao
- Edited by: Sundar Moliya
- Music by: Pappu Pawan; Shaheen; Shyam Anuragi (lyrics)
- Production company: Suchitra Art Enterprises
- Release date: 29 September 2000
- Running time: 125 minutes
- Country: India
- Language: Hindi
- Budget: ₹1.25 crore
- Box office: ₹1.02 crore

Aaj Ka Ravan (transl. Today's Devil) is a 2000 Indian Hindi-language action film directed by Imran Khalid and produced by Surendra Srivastava. It is a revenge drama, with Mithun Chakraborty in the lead role. The film was released on 29 September 2000.

== Plot ==
A male journalist investigating illegal arms dealings is stabbed to death in front of the house of a young female journalist named Shanti.

Shanti swears to expose the main culprit, Vishtar Nath, and bring him to justice. For this reason, she writes an article about Vishtar in the newspaper and exposes his criminal acts. One night, Shanti is harassed by Vishtar's men, but a man named Shankar saves her from them. Shanti tells him everything and marries a Rocky, making him her brother. From now on, Shanti is attacked in various ways because Vishtar does not leave his enemies alone.

One day, a young girl gives Shankar a film reel that directly implicates Vishtar Nath in his illegal arms dealings. Shankar immediately gives the film reel to the police commissioner. The police commissioner destroys that footage, causing Shankar to be arrested by a rebellious and hateful police inspector for having RDX in his car. Shankar is beaten black and blue in the police station and then, on the pretext of bail, is told that he can leave.

On his way out of the police station, he is confronted by rebellious police officers and Nath's men, tied up, shot several times and left to die. He is saved by Shanti, but then attacked in the hospital by Nath's assassin, Bhakra. Shankar brutally beats him up and brutally kills him. Inspector Vikram witnesses this and tells him that he is a "Ravan" (devil) and is now a murderer.

Shankar says that he tried to be an angel and a law-abiding citizen, but he got nothing but contempt and death threats - so now he wants to be a devil and destroy Nath, the leader of the underworld. Inspector Vikram, who is also looking to arrest Vishtar, falls in love with Shanti and they get engaged.

Finally, one evening, while Shanti and Vikram are at their house, the doorbell rings. Shanti goes to open the door, but as soon as she opens it, Vishtar, who is standing behind the door, plunges a long, thick spear into the middle of Shanti's abdomen (Shanti's navel area) in such a way that after entering the young woman's abdomen and passing through her navel and intestines, the spear comes out from behind Shanti's body. Vikram, seeing his fiancée in great pain, fights with Vishtar and Vishtar's men. Shanti and Vikram are killed by a terrifying spear thrust into their stomachs.

Shankar, Shanti's adopted brother, eventually takes a harsh revenge on Vishtar.

In all this time destroying the underworld and killing bad guys, Shankar also finds time to fall in love, sing, and dance with his lover, Mona.

== Cast ==
- Mithun Chakraborty as Shankar
- Gajendra Chauhan as A.C.P. Rathore
- Siddharth Dhawan as Inspector Vikram Singh
- Mohan Joshi as Vishdhar Nath
- Shakti Kapoor
- Shalini Kapoor as Ramkali
- Kasam Ali as Babbar Bakhra
- Javed Khan
- Mushtaq Khan as Gul Gulewala (Gullu Malwani)
- Indira Krishnan as Shanti
- Vinod Kulkarni as Subhash
- Meenakshi as Mona
- Anil Nagrath as Khilawan
- Master Rashid as Munna — Subhash & Saraswathi's son
- Tej Sapru as Inspector Raman Khatri
- O.P. Sharma
- Ashok Verma
- Zubeda as Saraswathi — Subhash's wife

== Songs ==
1. "Haathon Ki Mehendi" - Udit Narayan, Vibha Sharma
2. "Ho Raja Khele Mera Paan Chaila" - Vinod Rathod, Madhushree
3. "Jaane Jaa Janam Tu Janeman" - Babul Supriyo, Kavita Krishnamurthy
4. "Khanka Re Khanka Khangana" - Udit Narayan, Anuradha Paudwal
5. "Khidki Khule Ya Band" - Babul Supriyo, Poornima
6. "Ladki Tu Kamal Hai" - Vinod Rathod

== Reception ==
Fullhyd.com gave the film 1 star out of 10, calling the direction non-existent and the music, terrible.
