= Nitesh Pandey =

Indian actor (1972–2023)

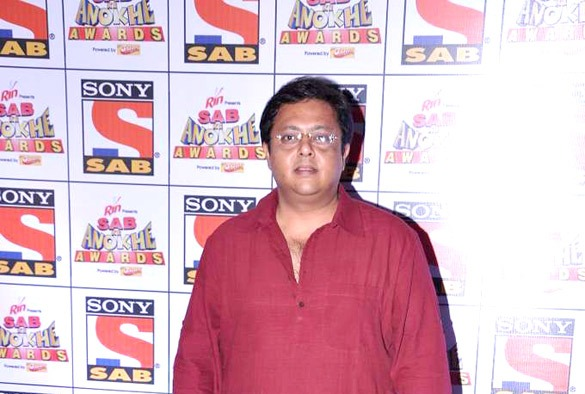
- Pandey in 2013
- Born: 17 January 1972; Kumaon division, Uttar Pradesh, India
- Died: 23 May 2023 (aged 51); Igatpuri, Maharashtra, India
- Occupations: Actor, film director
- Years active: 1995–2017; 2020–2023
- Spouse(s): Ashwini Kalsekar (m. 1998; div. 2002) Arpita Pandey (m. 2003)

Nitesh Pandey (17 January 1972 – 23 May 2023) was an Indian film and television actor.

== Career ==
Pandey began doing theatre in 1990. In 1995, he got his first acting opportunity in a show called Tejas in which he played a detective, however the show was never aired, due to the loss of broadcaster BITV's satellite. Pandey worked in serials such as Manzilein Apani Apani, Astitva...Ek Prem Kahani, Saaya, Justajoo, and Durgesh Nandini, and in films including Om Shanti Om and Khosla Ka Ghosla. He also ran an independent production house called Dream Castle Productions, which produces radio shows. He did theatre shows such as Aastha and Misal Pav with Sudha Chandran. His performance was noticed in Khosla Ka Ghosla.

== Personal life and death ==
Pandey married Ashwini Kalsekar in 1998 and they divorced in 2002. He later married TV actress Arpita Pandey. The couple had a son Aarav.

Pandey died from a heart attack at a hotel in Igatpuri, Nashik, Maharashtra, on 23 May 2023, at the age of 51.

== Filmography ==
=== Films ===
*Note: all films are in Hindi, unless otherwise noted.

Year	Film	Role	Notes
1995	Baazi	–	
2005	Sins	—	English film
2006	Khosla Ka Ghosla	Mani	
2007	Om Shanti Om	Anwar Sheikh	
2012	Dabangg 2	Doctor	
2013	Mickey Virus	Professor	
2014	Shaadi Ke Side Effects	Hotel manager	
2015	Hunterrr	Deepak Surve	
2016	Madaari	Sanjay Jagtap	
2017	Rangoon	Patel	
2022	Badhaai Do	Prem Singh	
2023	Once Upon Two Times	Nipun Roongta	Posthumous release
2024	Berlin	Mehta	Posthumous release
2024	Jo Tera Hai Woh Mera Hai	Mehmood	Posthumous release
2025	Ghich Pich	Rakesh Arora	Posthumous release

=== Television shows ===
Year(s)	Show	Role
1995	Tejas	Detective
1998	Saaya	Manoj
2001	Manzilein Apani Apani	Ankush
2002	Justajoo	Mehul
2002–2006	Astitva...Ek Prem Kahani	Dr. Pranay
2008	Hum Ladkiyan	Kamal Nath
2008	Sunaina	Vijay Mathur
2010	Jaankhilavan Jasoos	Jaankhilavan
2011–2013	Kuch Toh Log Kahenge	Armaan
2012–2014	Pyaar Ka Dard Hai Meetha Meetha Pyaara Pyaara	Harish Kumar
2016–2017	Ek Rishta Saajhedari Ka	Virendra Mittal
2020	Maharaj Ki Jai Ho!	King Dhritarasthra
2020–2021	Indiawaali Maa	Hasmukh
2020–2021	Hero – Gayab Mode On	Ranjeet Sidhwani
2023	Anupamaa	Dheeraj Kapoor
2024	Gyaarah Gyaarah	Balwant Singh

=== Web series ===
Year	Title	Role
2022	What The Folks (WTF)	Prakash Sharma
