= Firangi Bahu =

- Genre: drama
- Country of origin: India
- Original language: Hindi
- No. of episodes: 245

Production
- Editor: Sameer Gandhi
- Production company: Optimystix Entertainment

Original release
- Network: Sahara One
- Release: 6 August 2012 – 12 July 2013

Firangi Bahu (transl. Foreign daughter-in-law) is a drama TV series on Sahara One. It is a story that revolves around a mother-in-law and her daughter-in-law. Indira Krishna plays the role of the mother-in-law and Dutch actress Sippora Zoutewelle plays the daughter-in-law in the serial.

== Plot ==
This show portrays the story of the Desai family and their firangi bahu, Camili. Featuring key social issues like alcoholism, cultural prejudice, abortion and modern Indian family values; the plot follows the couple from their romantic university days in London to the not-so-ideal reality of a multi-generational household in India, the Desai's. Core changes in Hindustani culture, like the rejection of family-arranged marriages and modern romantic ideas promoting love-matches, serve to highlight the real-life adaptation of cultural views regarding family happiness in a more global India. The tension between traditional and modern family values divides the family as the couple tries and eventually fails to obtain genuine family approval without inuring deep-seated prejudice, personal injury and social conflict.

Corruption and dishonesty poke at deeply emotionalized cultural differences when Camili's younger sister-in-law asks for her help only to twist her own tawdry karma into malicious family slander aimed at the firangi bahu. In a dramatic display of black magic, family cultural pressure and cowardliness, others in the Desai family begin to conspire against Camili when a traditional paternal aunt comes to visit. This mother-in-law and daughter-in-law drama takes a nail-biting turn when the Desai elder aunt plots to break up the marriage.

The elder aunt unjustifiably calls Camili out publicly as a liar, belittles her, accusing her of eating meat, then of having a gambling addiction, and finally of hiding an abortion and conspiring for a divorce. The mounting family tension spells doom for the innocent and unwitting Camili. Fate folds as the malevolent curse strikes and Camili dies in a bus explosion, forcing the whole family to admit their own truths or be haunted by her unrelenting memory. But then details are revealed while the family recovers from the loss of Camili that the Desai elder aunt is eager to re-wed Pranay to the daughter of a family friend, who comes to stay with the Desai family. Just as grief lifts from the house, a new revelation changes everything, when a survivor of the bus bombing slowly begins to remember that she's the firangi bahu, Camili.

== Cast ==
- Sippora Zoutewelle as Camili Jonathan
- Rohit Bhardwaj as Pranay Desai
- Indira Krishnan as Ranjan Desai
- Pranoti Pradhan as Asha Desai
- Deepmala Parmar as Dasika Desai
- Dilip Darbar
- Hetal Puniwala as Prakash Desai
- Paresh Bhatt as Paresh Desai
- Kanishka Soni as Juhi
- Apara Mehta
- Jass Bhatia as Bakshish
