= Chhatrasal (TV series) =

Hindi-language Indian film

- Genre: Historical Drama, War
- Screenplay by: Samrat Chakraborty, Jainesh Ejardar
- Story by: Samrat Chakraborty, Jainesh Ejardar
- Directed by: Anadii Chaturvedi
- Starring: Neena Gupta; Ashutosh Rana; Jitin Gulati; Vaibhavi Shandilya; Manish Wadhwa; Manmohan Tiwari; Rudra Soni
- Music by: Hitesh Modak
- Country of origin: India
- Original language: Hindi
- No. of episodes: 20

Production
- Producers: Abhyudaya Grover; Utsarg Grover; Anadii Chaturvedi; Rachell Ambrose; Ravindra Grover; Udayan Grover
- Cinematography: Manoj Soni, Mukesh Tiwari
- Editor: Suyash Lakhan
- Running time: 40-51 Minutes

Original release
- Network: MX Player
- Release: 29 July 2021

Chhatrasal is a 2021 Indian Hindi-language Historical drama web series based on the life of Maharaja Chhatrasal, who fought against the Mughal Empire, and in 1675 established his kingdom in Bundelkhand. The film is directed by Anadii Chaturvedi and stars Neena Gupta, Ashutosh Rana, Jitin Gulati, Vaibhavi Shandilya, Manish Wadhwa, Manmohan Tiwari and Rudra Soni. The film premiered and aired on OTT platform MX Player

== Cast ==
- Neena Gupta as the narrator
- Jitin Gulati as Maharaja Chhatrasal
- Vaibhavi Shandilya as Devkunwari, wife of Maharaja Chhatrasal
- Ashutosh Rana as Aurangzeb, the Mughal Emperor
- Manish Wadhwa
- Jaswinder Gardner, as Sarandha
- Anushka Luhar
- Manmohan Tiwari
- Rudra Soni as Young Maharaja Chhatrasal

== Secondary cast ==
- Sangam Rai as Champat Rai
- Bhupendra as Mahabali Patel
- Lokesh Batta as Bal Diwan
- Yash Buddhadeb as Young Aurangzeb
- Vikas Singh as Pahaad Singh
- Ali Mughal as Baki Khan
- BK Modi as Shahjahan
- Zidan as Child Chhatrasal
- Ajay Mehar as Vidvan
- Harsh as Mohan Singh
- Pramod Tripathi as Sarpanch
- Shyam Sundar as Village Pandit
- Krishnan Saajnani as Bheemsingh
- Jitendra Bohra as Anirudh Singh
- Kalyani Jha as Village Mother
- Pradeep Tiwari as Karan
- Visha Rai as Sambhu
- Maushami Udeshi as Mehbooba
- Arbendra Singh as Riyaaz Khan
- Kamaldeep Maan as Fidai Khan
- Nikhil Tyagi as Hriday Shah
- Vikas Khokar as Jagat Rai
- Sudeep Sarangi as South Pandit
- Anil as Shubkaran
- Himanshu as Jai Singh
- Yash as Keshav Das
- Shaan Kakkar as Kok Singh
- Yash Puri as Dev Karan
- Amit Lekhawani as Bahadur Khan
- Shivam as Mittho Peerzada
- Vinay Yadav as Fauze Miyan
- Deepak Narang as Sher Afagan Khan
- Jolly Bhatia as Angad Rai’s wife
- Nishant Singh as Chhatrapati Shivaji Maharaj
- Azad Chauhan as Keshav Rai Dangi
- Prakhar Saxena as Ruh Allah Khan
- Bhushan as Kavi Bhushan
- Akanksha as Tej Kunwari
