= Chetna Pande =

Indian actress and model (born 1989)

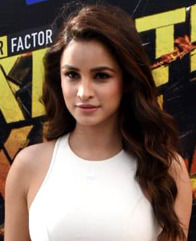
- Pande in 2022
- Occupations: Actress, model
- Years active: 2010–present

Chetna Pande is an Indian actress and model. She is known for her work in Hindi films productions and her participation in reality shows. She is best known for being a contestant in MTV's reality show Ace of Space 1 and Colors TV's stunt based reality show Fear Factor: Khatron Ke Khiladi 12.

== Career ==
Pande appeared in the TV series MTV Fanaah and in music videos. Her second participation in cinema was in Dilwale, with the role of Jenny. In 2018, she participated in MTV's Ace of Space, but got evicted on 17 December. On 30 November 2018, she was cast on ALT Balaji's web series NIS.

== Filmography ==
Key
†	Denotes films that have not yet been released

=== Television ===
Year	Title	Role	Notes	Ref.
2015	Pyaar Tune Kya Kiya	Aditi	Season 6; Episode 1	
2016	MTV Fanaah	Dhara/Avni		
2018	Ace of Space 1	Contestant	10th place	
2019	Ace of Space 2	Herself	Guest	
2022	Fear Factor: Khatron Ke Khiladi 12	Contestant	11th place	
2023	Temptation Island India	Contestant		

=== Web series ===
Year	Title	Role	Ref.
2018	Home: It's A Feeling	Hina Shah	
2020	Class of 2020	Priyanka Ahluwalia	

=== Films ===
Year	Title	Role	Notes	Ref.
2010	Neeyum Naanum	Diya	Tamil film	
2011	Dil Toh Baccha Hai Ji	Piya Varma	Cameo appearance	
2013	I Don't Luv U	Aayra Sehgal		
2015	Dilwale	Jenny D'Costa		
2018	Jaane Kyun De Yaaron	Sheetal		
2026	Haunted 3D: Echoes of the Past	Sunehri		

=== Music videos ===
Year	Title	Singer	Ref.
2011	Ki Samjhaiye	Amrinder Gill	
2016	Dont Mind Kudiye	Kuwar Virk	
2016	Simple Dress	Rahul Vaidya	
2017	Miss You	Ishq Bector	
2018	Bewafa Tu	Guri	
2018	Dil De Khulle	Arsh Maini	
2019	Friday Night	Himan	
2019	World Tour	Abhay Singh	
2019	Kare Naina	Ishq Bector	
2020	Laal Chunariya	Akull	
2021	Aadat	Ishaan Khan	
