= Waaris (2008 TV series) =

- Promotional logo image
- Written by: Rajesh Dubey
- Directed by: Bhushan Patel, Santram Varma
- Starring: see below
- Opening theme: "Waaris" by Mad Trax & Bittu Merchant
- Country of origin: India
- Original language: Hindi
- No. of episodes: 64

Production
- Producer: Smriti Irani
- Running time: 24 minutes

Original release
- Network: Zee TV
- Release: 28 July – 4 December 2008

Waaris is a Hindi television crime drama series directed by Bhushan Patel that aired on Zee TV channel from 28 July 2008 until 4 December 2008. (It should not be confused with the famous 1979 Pakistan Television drama Waris). The plot of the Indian drama Waaris is similar in quite a few aspects to the Ram Gopal Varma films, Sarkar (2005) and Sarkar Raj (2008). The series ran for a total of 64 episodes, excluding the 12 episodes that could have broadcast but were canceled due to the Indian Television Strike that occurred for 3 weeks long.

== Plot ==
The story is based on the life of an underworld mafia don, Rudra Pratapsingh, who is searching for a true or suitable "Waaris" (inherent, heir) for the position that he created in his criminal-world.

== Cast ==
- Mohammed Iqbal Khan as Shankar Pratapsingh
- Ashish Vidyarthi as Rudra Pratapsingh
- Indira Krishnan as Yashoda Rudra Pratapsingh
- Gauri Nigudkar as Swati Pratapsingh
- Yuvraj Malhotra as Shaurya Pratapsingh
- Akshay Sethi as Karan
- Shilpa Shinde as Gayatri Shankar Pratapsingh
- Rucha Gujarathi as Simran
- Khushboo Purohit as Swati
- Kiran Kumar as Ganesh Shetty
- Manish Raisinghan as Sunny Shetty
- Buddhaditya Mohanty
- Bhawna Roy
