= Love Day - Pyaar Ka Din =

- Directed by: Harish Kotian; Sandeep Choudhary
- Written by: Harish Kotian; Sandeep Choudhary
- Produced by: Baldev Singh Bedi
- Starring: Ajaz Khan; Sahil Anand; Harsh Nagar; Shalu Singh; Anant Mahadevan; Vaibhav Mathur
- Cinematography: Amit Singh
- Edited by: Sunil Yadav
- Music by: Sumesh Himanshu; Raina Sawan; Sagar Sarkar; Vishnu Narayan
- Production company: Shree Rajlaxmi Entertainment
- Release date: 21 October 2016
- Country: India
- Language: Hindi
- Budget: 2.25 crore
- Box office: 2.95 crore

Love Day - Pyaar Ka Din is an Indian comedy-drama film based on friendship, that was written and directed by Harish Kotian and Sandeep Choudhary. The movie features Ajaz Khan, Sahil Anand, Harsh Nagar, and Shalu Singh in the lead roles. This film was released on 14 October 2016.

== Plot ==
Life without friends is like living in hell, but when you have friends who are no less than devils, your life can be a living hell. Love Day - Pyaar Ka Din explores the journey of three childhood friends: Monty (Ajaz Khan), Sandy (Sahil Anand), and Harry (Harsh Nagar). Sandy and Harry often fall into trouble due to Monty's antics. Sandy's and Harry's families do not approve of their friendship with Monty and separate the three friends. However, Monty returns to his friends' lives after five years with a plan that would make them all rich. Monty's plan backfires, and his friends land into trouble again. Will Sandy and Harry regret their lifelong friendship?

== Cast ==
- Ajaz Khan as Monty
- Sahil Anand as Sandy
- Harsh Nagar as Harry
- Anant Mahadevan as Dr. Sheikh
- Vaibhav Mathur as Prabhu
- Shalu Singh as Saheba

== Production ==
Love Day - Pyaar Ka Din was shot in locations like Dehradun, Shimla, Mumbai, Panvel, and Lonavala. A part of the film was shot at the Graphic Era University (GEU) Campus in Dehradun.

== Music ==
The music directors of the film are Sumesh Himanshu, Raina Sawan, Sagar Sarkar and Vishnu Narayan. The lyricists are Himanshu Joshi, Aslam Soni and Ravi Babu. The songs are sung by Mika, Shaan, Mohit Chauhan, Anis Sharma, Bhumi Trivedi and Shreya Shaleen.

No.	Title	Lyrics	Music	Singer(s)	Length
1.	"Lage Love Day"	Himanshu Joshi	Sumesh Himanshu	Mika Singh
2.	"Oh Saheba"	Himanshu Joshi	Sumesh Himanshu	Shaan, Shreya Shaleen
3.	"Khao Khujao Batti Bujao"	Aslam Soni	Vishnu Narayan	Mika Singh
4.	"Yeh Aisi Hai Teri Dosti"	Ravi Babu	Sagar Sarkar	Mohit Chauhan
5.	"Yeh Aisi Hai Teri Dosti" (Child Version)	Ravi Babu	Sagar Sarkar	Anish Sharma
