= Vipul Gupta =

Indian actor

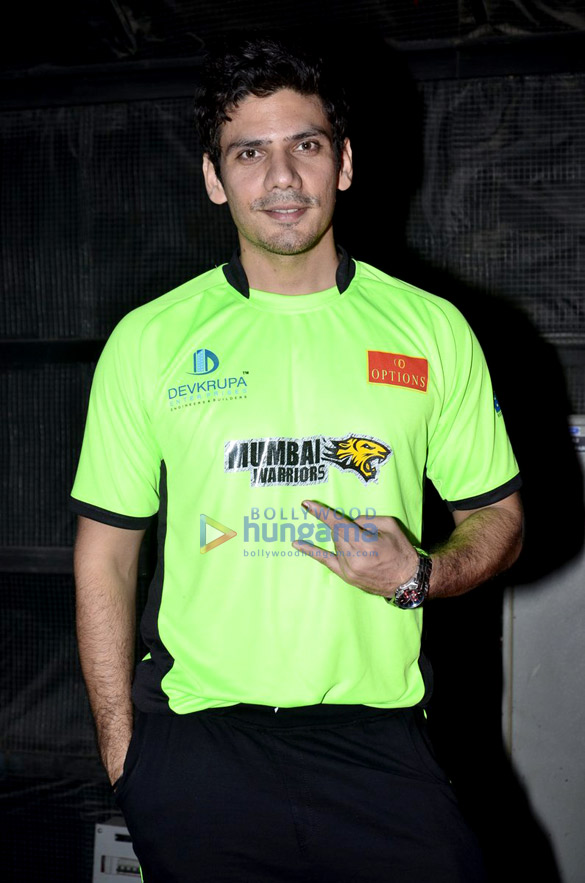
- Gupta at the launch of Box Cricket League 2014
- Occupations: Actor; model
- Years active: 2004–present
- Known for: K. Street Pali Hill; India Calling; Ek Nayi Chhoti Si Zindagi; Ek Nanad Ki Khushiyon Ki Chaabi – Meri Bhabhi

Vipul Gupta is an actor and model. He is best known for playing the lead roles of Drone Keshav in K. Street Pali Hill, Aditya Khanna in India Calling, Samarth Ojha in Ek Nayi Chhoti Si Zindagi and Anand Shergill in Ek Nanad Ki Khushiyon Ki Chaabi – Meri Bhabhi. He was seen as Jagat Singh in the 2020 film Tanhaji.

== Career ==
Vipul Gupta is an MBA in Marketing. Before entering into TV serials; he has done many popular TVCs and advertisements for many well-known brands; including Indian Oil, Mountain Dew and LG Mobile.

Vipul started his career with K. Street Pali Hill as Drone Keshab on Star Plus, which gave him the top notch success due to his role as Drone. Followed by that he was offered another daily soap 'India Calling' at the same time. Hence Vipul shifted from K. Street Pali hill to India Calling afterwards; due to the scheduling issues. By the year 2013 he got back again on Star Plus with a daily soap Meri Bhabhi as Anand Shergill; playing the lead on STAR Plus. Meri Bhabhi was also a successful project due to its heart touching story line.

Most of Vipul's fans say that K. Street Pali hill was successful for about a year only; till he was playing the lead. But later it lost its popularity due to his replacement.

Vipul Gupta has also been a brand ambassador for Onida Electronics, which is among India's most trusted brands.

== Television and web series ==
Year	Show	Role	Note
2004 - 2005	K. Street Pali Hill	Drone Keshab	Main lead
2005 - 2006	India Calling	Aditya Khanna	Main lead
2007	Four (TV series)	Rakesh	Main lead
2011	Ek Nayi Chhoti Si Zindagi	Samarth Ojha	Main lead
2012	Teri Meri Love Stories	N/A	Episodic role
2013 - 2014	Meri Bhabhi	Anand Zorawar Shergill	Main lead
2014 - 2015	Ek Tha Rusty	Rusty	Main lead
2015	Darr Sabko Lagta Hai	Dr. Purab in episode eighteen	Episodic role
2017	Maaya	Rahul	Main lead
2017	Aarambh		
2020	Special OPS	Balakrishna "Bala" Reddy	Main lead
2023	Hack: Crimes Online	ACP Ashutosh Bhatnagar	Main lead

== Filmography ==
Year	Title	Role
2004	Lakshya	Captain Rakesh Bhavnani
2009	Fox	Raj Thakur
2011	Yeh Saali Zindagi	Shyam
2020	Tanhaji	Jagat Singh

== Commercials ==
- Airtel
- Mountain Dew
- Liril
- Siyaram Suitings
- Pears
- Indian Oil
