= Rahe Tera Aashirwaad =

- Genre: Fantasy
- Developed by: Ashvini Yardi
- Written by: Saurabh Tewari, R M Joshi & Tushar Joshi
- Directed by: Toto
- Starring: See below
- Theme music composer: Naveen & Manish
- Opening theme: "Rahe Tera Aashirwaad" by Alka Yagnik
- Country of origin: India
- Original language: Hindi
- No. of seasons: 01
- No. of episodes: 200

Production
- Executive producers: Chandan Upadhyay & Manpreet Singh
- Producers: Jay Mehtaa & Kinnari Mehtaa
- Editors: Pankaj Kathpal, Rahul Mathur, & Atul Arya
- Camera setup: Multi-camera
- Running time: Approx. 24 minutes
- Production company: Jay Production

Original release
- Network: Colors TV
- Release: 21 July 2008 – 1 May 2009

Rahe Tera Aashirwaad (transl. May your blessings be always with me) is an Indian television series which premiered on Colors TV on 21 July 2008. The story portrays the life of an orphan girl who fights evil with the grace of Goddess Vaishno Devi.

== Cast ==
- Snigdha Srivastava as Bhakti
- Akshay Sethi as Akshat Bali
- Indira Krishnan as Guru Mata
- Sonali Verma as Durga Mata
- Shahbaz Khan as Bali
- Ajaz Khan as Tej Bali
- Sonica Handa as Shalaka Tej Bali
- Vipra Rawa as Aparajita Bali
