= Manzilein Apani Apani =

Indian television series

- Promotional logo
- Genre: Drama
- Created by: Subrat Bose & Anurag Basu
- Developed by: Subrat Bose
- Written by: Subrat Bose
- Directed by: Anurag Basu
- Starring: See below
- Theme music composer: Pritam-Jeet
- Opening theme: "Manzilein Apni Apni" by Abhijeet Bhattacharya
- Country of origin: India
- Original language: Hindi
- No. of seasons: 1
- No. of episodes: Total 68

Production
- Producer: Deepshikha Bose
- Cinematography: Mahesh Talkar & Abhishek Basu
- Editor: Pravin Prabhakaran
- Camera setup: Multi-camera
- Running time: Approx. 24 minutes
- Production company: Abhiyaan Productions

Original release
- Network: Zee TV
- Release: 30 April 2001

Manzilein Apni Apni is an Indian television series that aired on Zee TV, based on the lives of two cousin brothers: Rahul and Ankush. The series is directed by known Indian film & television producer-director Anurag Basu.

== Cast ==
- Prachi Shah as Priya
- Prabhat Bhattacharya as Prakash
- Jyoti Mukherjee as Shruti
- Indira Krishnan as Nanda
- Alka Kaushal as Smriti
- Dimple Ganguly
- Nitesh Pandey as Ankush
- Jayati Bhatia as Ruma
- Kaliprasad Mukherjee as Kali
- Uday Tikekar as Dinesh Roy
- unknown as Rahul
- unknown as Shankar
- unknown as Devvrat
- Jeetendra Bharadwaj as Deepak Roy
- Nandita Thakur as Mrs. Roy: Dinesh's wife
- unknown as Mr. Roy: Dinesh and Deepak's father; Shruti, Ankush and Rahul's grandfather
