= Mauka-E-Vardaat =

Indian crime drama

- Genre: Crime
- Created by: &TV
- Starring: Sapna Choudhary; Manoj Tiwari; Ravi Kishan; Mona Singh; Piyush Sahdev; Gaurav Khanna; Shahbaz Khan; Chetan Hansraj; Ankit Arora
- Country of origin: India
- Original language: Hindi
- No. of seasons: 2
- No. of episodes: 93

Production
- Producer: Hemant Prabhu Ravi Raj Babul Bhasin Anshuman Pratap Singh Spacewalker Studios
- Running time: 45 minutes

Original release
- Network: &TV
- Release: 9 March – 15 October 2021

Mauka-E-Vardaat is an Indian Hindi-language crime show aired by &TV. The series is hosted by Sapna Choudhary, Manoj Tiwari, Ravi Kishan, and Mona Singh.

This series was produced by RaviRaj Creations, Hemant Prabhu Studioz, A&I Productions and Salker, a ker Babul Bhasin, Chital Tripathi, Rajesh Tripathi, HePrabhu, Pbhu & Anshuman PrSingh and othersilms,

== Plot ==
The hosts present dramatised re-enactments of real-life crime cases that revolve around harassment, kidnapping and murder. The show is an anthology of stories that deal with heinous crimes and puts the spotlight on the victims who are often faced with a dilemma to choose between right and wrong.

== Host ==
- Manoj Tiwari as Host
- Ravi Kishan as Host
- Sapna Choudhary as Host
- Mona Singh as Host

== Cast ==
- Piyush Sahdev as Senior Inspector Piyush Rathore
- Aniruddh Roy as Vinod Singh
- Gaurav Khanna as Senior Inspector Gaurav Singh Rajput
- Shahbaz Khan as Senior Inspector Shahnawaz Khan
- Aman Verma as Senior Inspector Abhay Talwar
- Chetan Hansraj as Senior Inspector Harshvardhan Shekhawat
- Ankit Arora as Senior Inspector Rishiraj Pandey
- Kannan Arunachalam as Senior Inspector Srikant Iyyer
- Surendra Jha as Inspector Ram Singh
- Ansha Sayed as Inspector Anwesha Purohit
- Sonali Nikam as Inspector Kriti
- Tanya Abrol as Inspector Surabhi Kaur
- Poorti Arya as Rakshita Dussera (special episode)
- Abhishek Singh Rajput as Arun

=== Operation Vijay - Supernatural Cases Cast ===
- Ankit Arora as Inspector Rishiraj Pandey
- Aniruddh Roy as Joker
- Ansha Sayed as Inspector Anwesha Purohit
- Narendra Gupta as Newton Chattopadhyay 235-year-old genius Episode 77 - 93
- Piyush Sahdev as Inspector Piyush Rathore
- Sonali Nikam as Inspector Kriti
- Aman Verma as Inspector Abhay Talwar
- Chetan Hansraj as Senior Inspector Harshvardhan Shekhawat
- Shahbaz Khan as Senior Inspector Shahnawaz Khan

=== Recurring Cast ===
- Rohit Choudhary as Foolchand
