= Geet – Hui Sabse Parayi =

- Directed by: Nissar Parvez
- Country of origin: India
- Original language: Hindi
- No. of episodes: 470

Production
- Producer: Gul Khan
- Running time: 25 minutes approx
- Production company: 4 Lions Films

Original release
- Network: Star One
- Release: 5 April 2010 – 14 December 2011

Geet – Hui Sabse Parayi is an Indian soap opera which premiered on 5 April 2010 on Star One. It is the first series produced by 4 Lions Films. The show ended on 14 December 2011 when Star One was replaced by Life OK.

== Plot ==
Geet Handa is an innocent village girl of the Handa family. Her family decides to get her married to a rich NRI, named Dev Khurana, much to her dismay. Dev is actually married and lives away from his family due to some quarrels with his half-brother, Maan. In order to get money to pay off his gambling debts, he marries Geet and abandons her at the airport next day. Hurt, Geet returns to her village, finds out about her pregnancy and the truth Dev about. She meets Dev's half-brother, Maan and they start bickering all the time. When her family asks her to abort the unborn child, she refuses. They try to kill her but is saved by Maan.

Geet has her estranged paternal cousin, Brij arrested for his role in the murder plot against her, and publicly exposes her family's crimes and misdeeds, leading to their public disgrace. Geet also disowns her entire family for good, after finally realizing that they have never actually treated her with dignity, viewing her not as an individual, but only as an object for abuse and exploitation.

Also, the Handa family's actions, which included attempts on her life to conceal their harmful actions from the public that they had ruined her life, by pushing her into marriage with Dev and that had led to her unknowingly getting pregnant out of wedlock, without doing a proper background check at all, which only further solidified her decision.

Although Geet's father, Mohinderlaal is the only family member, who has ever actually treated her with dignity, but she also disowns him as well, suspecting that he was involved in the attempt on her life, completely unaware of the fact that he had actually been trying to protect her from the family's deadly schemes. Geet relocates to Delhi for employment and accidentally becomes Maan's secretary in his company, Khurana Constructions.

Geet, who is unaware of the fact that Mann is Dev's half-brother and Mann, who is unaware of Dev's illegal marriage with Geet, they fall in love with each other. Dev and his wife, Nayantara return and starts living with Mann. Although Geet also ends up being there often, they miss each other. Mann was furious to know about Geet's pregnancy, but later accepts Geet's unborn child and they decide to get engaged. Dev and Nayantara find out that Geet is Maan's secretary and try to avoid her. Later, they split-up, and a guilty Dev goes to Geet and opens up her relationship with Mann.

Disheartened, Geet breaks the engagement and walks away. Maan learns the truth and gets Dev jailed, but later with the help of Geet, bails him out. Geet thinking that Maan used her for bailing Dev, moves away from him, but they later reconcile. Nayanthara tries to kill Geet, but falls from the terrace and slips into coma. Her brother, Arjun decides to take revenge and fakes love with Anwesha, Maan's half-sister and consummates with her. But he later learns the truth about Nayantara's crimes and misdeeds, and unites with Anwesha.

Geet's estranged cousin, Brij tries to kill her as revenge for sending him to prison, but she is saved by Maan, who beats him to a bloody pulp and Brij is sent to prison again for his crimes of murder and attempted murder, he is possibly given a life sentence for all of his crimes. They marry, but Maan distances from her as she is expecting.

Geet falls down and miscarried the child. Later, Maan suspects Geet and Dev's closeness, which annoys Geet and she leaves, she runs into her maternal cousins, Lucky and Teji, and decides to stay at her aunt, Beeji's house. But they later reunite. Geet is abducted by her childhood one-sided obsessive love interest, Vikram, but is saved by Maan. Maan is attacked by his step-mother, Parminder, after which he loses his memory about Geet. But he later remembers her and they unite. The show ends with both of them becoming parents to a newborn son.

== Cast ==
=== Main ===
- Drashti Dhami as Geet Handa Singh Khurana: Mohinderlaal and Rano's estranged daughter; Brij, Lucky, Nandini and Teji's cousin; Daarji's estranged granddaughter; Maan's secretary and wife (2010-2011)
- Gurmeet Choudhary as Maan Singh Khurana: An honest businessman and the CEO of Khurana Constructions; Parminder's estranged step-mother; Anwesha and Dev's half-brother; Savitri's grandson; Geet's employer and husband (2010-2011)

=== Recurring ===
- Suhasini Mulay/Anju Mahendru as Savitri Singh Khurana: The matriarch of the Khuranna family; Anwesha, Dev and Maan's grandmother (2010-2011)
- Abhinav Shukla/Samir Sharma as Dev Singh Khurana: Parminder's estranged son, Anwesha's brother; Maan's half-brother; Savitri's grandson; Meera's best friend; Naintara's estranged ex-husband and enemy; Nandini's husband (2010-2011)/(2011)
- Nikunj Malik as Anwesha Singh Khurana: An honest businesswoman and the co-CEO of Rathore Industries; Parminder's daughter; Dev's sister; Maan's half-sister; Savitri's granddaughter; Arjun's lover (2010)
- Melanie Pais as Nandini Singh Khurana: Beeji's daughter; Lucky and Teji's sister; Geet's maternal cousin; Dev's wife (2010-2011)
- Tanushree Kaushal/Usma Bachani as Parminder Singh Khurana: Anwesha and Dev's estranged mother; Maan's estranged step-mother and enemy; Savitri's estranged daughter-in-law and enemy (2010-2011)
- Karishma Randhawa/Sonali Nikam as Naintara Singh Rathore: Arjun's estranged sister; Dev's estranged ex-wife and enemy; Geet, Meera, Maan, Nandini and Savitri's enemy (2010–2011)
- Behzaad Khan as Brij Handa: A cowardly, psychotic and unintelligent criminal; Geet's estranged paternal cousin, enemy and attempted killer; Mohinderlaal's estranged nephew and enemy; Maan's enemy (2010)
- Talat Rekhi as Daarji Handa: Mohinderlaal's estranged father; Brij and Geet's grandfather (2010)
- Praneet Bhat as Aditya "Adi"; Geet's friend and co-worker (2010-2011)
- Aditi Chopra as Pinky: Geet's best friend and co-worker (2010-2011)
- Kanika Maheshwari as Sasha: Geet's mean co-worker (2010)
- Aakanksha Nimonkar as Tasha: Geet's mean co-worker (2010)
- Perneet Chauhan as Meera: Dev's best friend; Naintara's enemy (2010)
- Jaanvi Sangwan as Beeji: Rano's sister; Geet's maternal aunt; Lucky, Nandini and Teji's mother (2010-2011)
- Prashant Chawla as Teji: Beeji's son; Lucky and Nandini's brother; Geet's maternal cousin (2010-2011)
- Ahwaan Kumar as Lucky: Beeji's son; Teji and Nandini's brother; Geet's maternal cousin; Preeto's husband (2010-2011)
- Divya Bhatnaga/Khushbu Thakkar as Preeto: Lucky's wife (2010-2011)
- Shalini Kapoor Sagar as Rano Handa: Mohinderlaal's wife; Geet's estranged mother (2010)
- Neelu Kohli as Rupinder Handa: Geet's estranged paternal aunt (2010)
- Vicky Ahuja as Mohinderlaal Handa: Daarji's estranged son; Brij's estranged uncle and enemy; Rano's husband; Geet's estranged father (2010)
- Manish Naggdev as Gurvinder (2010-2011)
- Jay Bhanushali as Yash Malhotra (2010-2011)
- Neha Jhulka as Pari (2010)
- Piyush Sahdev as Arjun Singh Rathore: An honest businessman and the CEO of Rathore Industries; Naintara's estranged brother; Anwesha's lover (2010)
- Rumi khan
- Vishal Thakkar as Manav
- Iira Soni as Nitya (2010)
- Arjun Pundir as Sangram Gujjar
- Vikas Sethi as Vikram: Geet's one-sided obsessive love interest; Maan's enemy (2011)

== Reception ==
In October 2011, Kshama Rao of Hindustan Times wrote that the trp of the show is "abysmal" but the "show has now found a loyal audience online."
