= Aadhe Adhoore =

2015 Indian TV series

- Genre: Soap opera
- Written by: Meenakshi Gupta
- Directed by: Ajai Sinha
- Starring: Sonali Nikam; Arpit Kapoor
- Opening theme: Aadhe Adhoore Khwaab hai by Mahalaxmi Iyer
- Country of origin: India
- Original language: Hindi
- No. of seasons: 1
- No. of episodes: 104

Production
- Producers: Zindagi TV Productions; Ananda Films
- Production location: Kapurthala (Punjab) India
- Editor: Manish Mistry
- Running time: ~25 minutes

Original release
- Network: Zindagi
- Release: 14 December 2015 – 12 April 2016

Aadhe Adhoore is an Indian television series which aired on Zindagi from 14 December 2015 to 12 April 2016. The story revolves around Jassi who lives in rural Kapurthala in Punjab with a loving mother-in-law and her brother-in-law as her husband works abroad. The show touched on themes of incomplete relationships and love. Despite a complex storyline and well-received acting performances, the show had high popularity.

== Plot ==
Jassi is a young married woman who lives with her affectionate mother-in-law, Beeji, and her younger brother-in-law, Varinder. Jassi's husband, Narinder, works abroad, and they talk often on the phone figuring out how they can live together. Though she is an ideal daughter-in-law and gets along with everyone at home and in the community, Jassi feels incomplete as she pines for her husband. It is revealed that she and Varinder are having an affair for some time and are deeply in love. Hidden from Beeji, they secretly spend nights together, completely aware of the risk of their relationship.

Soon, Beeji receives a marriage proposal for Varinder and despite his unwillingness, Varinder agrees after Jassi convinces him that this can give their affair an added layer of protection. Jassi discovers she has gotten pregnant and in a state of panic, she and Varinder visit a hospital so she can get an abortion. Witnessed by a relative of Varinder's fiancé Nimmi. Jassi and Varinder manage to explain the situation, but the wedding is called off. Jassi then decides to find Varinder a match and he is married to the soft-spoken and young Channi.

Now married, Varinder starts caring for Channi. Jassi finds it impossible to deal with Virender’s opportunistic indecisiveness after his marriage. He would stay away from her for long periods only to return and resume the relationship. Varinder and Jassi's relationship goes through a new phase as Beeji soon discovers their affair. When Beeji argues with Jassi, she falls to her death from a stairway.

After some days, Channi pointed by the broken bangle pieces in her bed and carpet and found that these are Jassi's bangles which she and Varinder gifted to her. Curious, Channi now receives help from Nimmi, and she gave the CCTV footage of the nursing home where Varinder took Jassi for abortion of her child. Finally, Channi came to know the relationship of her husband Varinder and her cousin sister Jassi.

In the last episode, Jassi dies accidentally in an attempt to save pregnant Channi – who let's Jassi die and doesn't try to save her. We see Channi waking up for morning prayer the next day.

== Cast ==
- Sonali Nikam as Jassi
- Arpit Kapoor as Narinder, Jassi's husband
- Rohit Bhardwaj as Varinder, Jassi's brother-in-law
- Geeta Udeshi as Saroj Beeji, Jassi's mother-in-law
- Priyanka Khera as Channi, Varinder's wife
- Manju Sharma as Jeeti Chachi
- Mohak Khurana as Pappu
- Neha Pal as Rani, a young house help who works for Beeji
- Ragini Sharma as Nimmi, Varinder's ex-fiancé
- Neha Chandra as Madhu
- Manav Sohal as Ashok
- Sonam Arora as Poonam

== Music ==
The title song "Aadhe Adhure" also known as "Kyun Hasaye Humein" has been sung by Mahalakshmi Iyer. Another song "Prabhat Feri" has been sung by Sardool Sikander. The lyrics are written by Meenakshi Gupta.
