= Ajaz Khan =

Indian actor (born 1981)

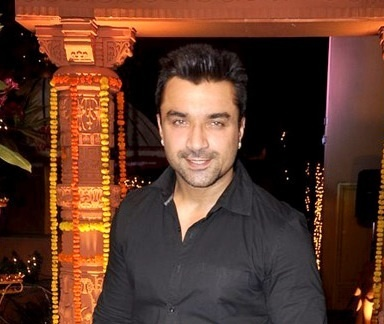
- Khan in 2014
- Born: 29 May 1981 (age 45); Ahmedabad, Gujarat, India
- Education: Vishwa Bharti School; St. Xavier's High School, Mirzapur
- Occupation: Actor
- Years active: 2003–present
- Spouse: Andrea Khan
- Children: Alexander Khan

Ajaz Khan (born May 29, 1981) is an Indian actor, who works in Hindi and Telugu-language television and films. He has starred in movies such as Rakta Charitra II and Allah Ke Banday and acted in several television daily soaps including Rahe Tera Aashirwaad and Kahaani Hamaaray Mahaabhaarat Ki. In 2013, Khan participated in Bigg Boss 7. He also appeared on the TV show Comedy Nights with Kapil which led to controversy.

His other films include Lakeer ka Fakeer and the Indian films Dookudu and Naayak. He has appeared in an Academy Awards promotion commercial.

Khan was in a music video for the song "Pal Pal" along with Saher Afsha, released by Tseries on 26 September 2020.

== Early life ==
Khan was born in Ahmedabad, India.

== Career ==
=== 2003–2009: Acting debut in television ===
Khan started his acting career in the film Patth, which was released in 2003. Later he made his television debut in Ekta Kapoor's Kyaa Hoga Nimmo Kaa, in 2007. The following year, Khan participated in the reality show Bollywood Club where he emerged as the winner. Later he appeared in the shows Rahe Tera Aashirwaad as Tej, Kahaani Hamaaray Mahaabhaarat Ki as Dushasan and Karam Apnaa Apnaa as Arjun.

=== 2009–2012: Entry in Bollywood ===
In 2009, Khan appeared in the film Ek: The Power of One. In 2010, he appeared in Shyam Ramsay's Bachao - Inside Bhoot Hai.... He then appeared in Rahul Dholakia's Lamhaa playing the role of Kuka Pare, the film was released in July 2010. This followed an appearance in Faruk Kabir's Allah Ke Banday playing the role of Nana Chauhan, however the film did not do well in the box office and was declared a disaster. He later appeared in the films Rakta Charitra 2 and Tequila Nights.

In 2011, he made his Telugu film debut, in Srinu Vaitla's Dookudu co-starring Mahesh Babu, released in September 2011. He then appeared in Bbuddah... Hoga Terra Baap which was a disaster at the box office. In 2012, he appeared in the film The World of Fashion.

=== 2013–present ===
In 2013, he appeared in the film Lakeer Ka Fakeer directed by Zubair Khan. Later he appeared in the Telugu films Naayak and Badshah.

In November 2013, Khan participated in the seventh season of the Indian version of the reality TV show Big Brother, called Bigg Boss. He entered as a wild card contestant who somehow survived until the end where he emerged as a finalist.

In April 2014, he participated in Colors TV's stunt reality show, Fear Factor: Khatron Ke Khiladi 5 as a wild card contestant. He later appeared on Comedy Nights with Kapil. In December 2014, he participated in Sony TV's cricket reality show Box Cricket League in its first season appearing in Sara Khan's team. Later he entered Bigg Boss 8, where he was introduced as the first challenger. He later got ejected from the house after his fight with Ali Quli Mirza in Bigg Boss Halla Bol!.

He appeared in the films Heart Attack, Ya Rab Veta (2014) and Temper (2015). In 2016, he appeared in Love Day - Pyaar Ka Din playing the role of Monty. In 2020 he appeared in the film Gul Makai.

== Personal life ==
Khan is married to Andrea Khan. They have one son, Alexander Khan.

On 21 October 2018, he was arrested by the Narcotics Cell of Mumbai police for allegedly possessing ecstasy. He was in Mumbai Central Jail for 26 months, after which he was granted bail by the Supreme Court of India. He raised several concerns over the conditions at the jail from his time spent in it.

== Filmography ==
=== Television ===
Year	Title	Role	Notes	Ref(s)
2007	Kyaa Hoga Nimmo Kaa	Aditya		
2008	Bollywood Club	Contestant	Winner	
2008	Rahe Tera Aashirwaad	Tej Bali		
2008	Ssshhhh...Koi Hai	Gulshan	Episodic role (Season 2; Episode 22)	
2008	Kahaani Hamaaray Mahaabhaarat Ki	Dushasan		
2009	Karam Apnaa Apnaa	Arjun		
2009	Specials @ 10 - Shaurat, Nafrat aur Showbiz	Guest		
2010	Matti Ki Banno	Arjit		
2011	Ek Nayi Chhoti Si Zindagi	Shekhar		
2012	Diya Aur Baati Hum	Abhishek		
2013	Bigg Boss 7	Contestant	2nd Runner Up	
2014	Fear Factor: Khatron Ke Khiladi 5	Contestant	Entered as wild card	
2014	Comedy Nights with Kapil	Supari Killer	Special appearance	
2014	Bigg Boss 8	Guest		
2014–2015	Box Cricket League 1	Contestant	Player in 'Rowdy Bangalore'	
2015	Bigg Boss Halla Bol!	Contestant	Challenger (Ejected; Day 2)	
2015	Farah Ki Dawat	Contestant		
2015	Comedy Classes	Guest		
2015	Savdhaan India	Ajju Bhai		
2016	Comedy Nights Bachao	Guest		
2016	Ek Maa Jo Laakhon Ke Liye Bani Amma	Azhar Yeda		

=== Films ===
Year	Film	Role	Language	Ref(s)
2003	Patth		Hindi	
2009	Ek... The Power of One	Yuvaraj	Hindi	
2010	Bachao - Inside Bhoot Hai...		Hindi	
2010	Lamhaa	Kuka Pare	Hindi	
2010	Allah Ke Banday	Nana Chauhan	Hindi	
2010	Rakta Charitra II	Bhondu	Hindi; Telugu	
2010	Tequila Nights		Hindi	TV movie aired on Zoom TV
2011	Dookudu	Bunty	Telugu	
2011	Bbuddah... Hoga Terra Baap	Supari Killer	Hindi	
2012	The World of Fashion	Mannu Bhai	Hindi	
2013	Lakeer Ka Fakeer	Fakeer	Hindi	
2013	Naayak	Taxi Seth	Telugu	
2013	Baadshah	Ruthless Johnny	Telugu	
2014	Heart Attack	Makarand Henchmen	Telugu	
2014	Ya Rab	Ran Vijay Singh	Hindi	
2014	Veta	Devraj	Telugu	
2015	Temper		Telugu	
2016	Love Day - Pyaar Ka Din	Monty	Hindi	
2017	Rogue		Telugu; Kannada	
2018	Inttelligent		Hindi	
2020	Gul Makai		Hindi	
2022	Hai Tujhe Salaam India	Govinda	Hindi	

== See also ==
- List of Indian film actors
