= Akshay Sethi =

Indian model and television actor (born 1980)

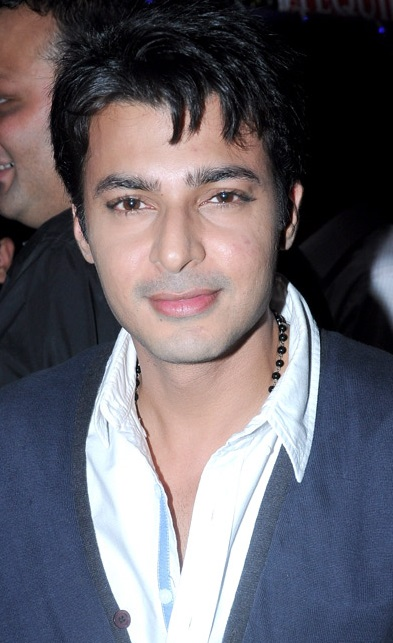
- Sethi in 2012
- Born: 2 October 1980 (age 45); Maharashtra, India
- Occupations: Model, Actor
- Years active: 2005–present
- Spouse: Bhagyashree Talware (m. 2021)

Akshay Sethi (born 2 October 1980) is an Indian model and television actor. He is well known for playing the double role in Sasural Genda Phool on Star Plus.

== Early life ==
Akshay Sethi was born on 2 October 1980 in Maharashtra, India.

== Personal life ==
Akshay got engaged to Bhagyashree Talware, a chartered accountant whose hometown is in Nashik on 19 October 2021. They got married on 9 December 2021.

== Career ==
Akshay did many commercials like Herohonda, Rin, Limca, Rediff, Hutch, Tvsapache, Bigbazaar etc. before television. He made his television debut with Saat Phere: Saloni Ka Safar as Yug on Zee TV. Akshay also played the role of Raunak, in Grihasti on Star Plus. After that he did Waaris on Zee TV and Rahe Tera Aashirwaad on Colors TV. He also did episodic roles in Adaalat, C.I.D., Hum Ne Li Hai- Shapath, Crime Patrol, Savdhaan India. He was last seen in Sasural Genda Phool as Deepak on Star Plus.

== Television ==
Year	Show	Role	Notes
2005	Hum Paanch	Karan	Episodic role
2006–2007	Saat Phere: Saloni Ka Safar	Yug	Supporting role
2007–2008	Dhoom Machaao Dhoom	Nihaal Singh Rathore	Lead role
2008	Grihasti	Raunak	Lead role
2008	Waaris	Karan	Supporting role
2008–2009	Rahe Tera Aashirwaad	Akshat Bali	Lead role
2010	Saath Nibhaana Saathiya	Umang Kapadia	Negative role
2010–2012	Sasural Genda Phool	Deepak Kashyap	Supporting role
2011	Crime Patrol		Episodic role
2011	Nachle Ve with Saroj Khan	Contestant	Reality show
2012–2016	Adaalat	Gajendra	Episodic role (Episode 140)
2012–2016	Adaalat	Joydeep	Episodic role (episodes 174-175)
2012–2016	Adaalat	Manas Shinde	Episodic role (Episode 4)
2012	Gumrah: End of Innocence	Anand	
2012–2019	Savdhaan India	Prateek	Episodic role (Episode 36)
2012–2019	Savdhaan India	Rohan	Episodic role (Episode 65)
2012–2019	Savdhaan India	Nirmal	Episodic role (Episode 190)
2012–2019	Savdhaan India	Rohit	Episodic role (Episode 374)
2012–2019	Savdhaan India	Rohit	Episodic role (Episode 528)
2012–2019	Savdhaan India	Aryan Joshi	Episodic role (Episode 607)
2012–2019	Savdhaan India	Nikhil Chaddha	Episodic role (Episode 665)
2012–2019	Savdhaan India	Vikram	Episodic role (Episode 697)
2012–2019	Savdhaan India	Sandeep	Episodic role (Episode 729)
2012–2019	Savdhaan India	Deepak	Episodic role (Episode 806)
2012–2019	Savdhaan India	Varun	Episodic role (Episode 954)
2012–2019	Savdhaan India	Raman	Episodic role (Episode 1039)
2012–2019	Savdhaan India	Amol	Episodic role (Episode 1360)
2012–2019	Savdhaan India	Saurabh	Episodic role (Episode 1519)
2012–2019	Savdhaan India	Sanket	Episodic role (Episode 1667)
2012–2019	Savdhaan India	Dr. Brijesh	Episodic role (Episode 1734)
2012–2019	Savdhaan India	Arjun	Episodic role (Episode 2324)
2012–2019	Savdhaan India	Shekhar	Episodic role (Episode 86)
2012–2019	Savdhaan India	Avdesh	Episodic role (Episode 195)
2012–2019	Savdhaan India	Arjit	Episodic role (Episode 288)
2012–2014	C.I.D.	Mohit	Episodic role (Episode 873)
2012–2014	C.I.D.	Nakul	Episodic role (episodes 1034-1035)
2012–2014	C.I.D.	Ankit	Episodic role (Episode 1070)
2012–2015	Fear Files: Darr Ki Sacchi Tasvirein	Akash	Episodic role (Episode 53)
2012–2015	Fear Files: Har Mod Pe Darr	Dhruv	Episodic role (along with Dalljiet Kaur)
2013–2015	Hum Ne Li Hai- Shapath	Rohan	Episodic role (Episode 207)
2013–2015	SuperCops vs Supervillains	Rajiv	Episodic role (Episode 44)
2013–2015	SuperCops vs Supervillains	Rajiv	Episodic role (Episode 140)
2014	Baal Veer	Mogambo Gomango	
2014	Pyaar Tune Kya Kiya	Sohail	Episodic role (Season 1 - Episode 11)
2015	Aahat	Abhishek	Episodic role (Episode 6)
2015	Laut Aao Trisha	Aarav	Cameo (Episode 142)
2015	Bhanwar	Siddharth Tyagi	Episodic role (Episode 31)
2015	Code Red	Rohan	Episodic role (Episode 84)
2016	Agent Raghav – Crime Branch	Sumit	
2017	Gangaa	Dhiraj	Cameo role
2018	Box Cricket League 3	Contestant	Player in Lucknow Nawabs
2019	Crime Alert	Gaurav	Episodic role (Episode 269)
2019	Crime Alert	Karan	Episodic role (Episode 307)
2020	Divya Drishti	Monty	Cameo role
2023	Swaraj	Sidhu Murumu	Episodic role (Episode 24)
