= Jass Bhatia =

Indian actor and model

- Born: Ludhiana, Punjab, India
- Other name: Jaskaran Singh Bhatia
- Occupation: Actor
- Years active: 2007–present
- Spouse: Sarvjyot Kaur Bhatia

Jass Bhatia (born Jaskaran Singh Bhatia) is an Indian actor and model. He began his career by working in several television commercials and print ads. He made his Bollywood debut with a supporting role in the Indian romantic drama film Mausam in 2011. He followed it with a role in the less successful film I Don't Luv U. In 2013, the Indian biographical sports drama film Bhaag Milkha Bhaag directed by Rakeysh Omprakash Mehra proved to be his first commercially successful film in 5 years. In 2014, Bhatia portrayed Parineeti Chopra's friend named "Chimsy" in Shaad Ali's Indian crime drama film Kill Dil. In the television circuit, Jass featured as Happy in Rab Se Sona Ishq and played the character Bakshish in Firangi Bahu.

== Early life and family ==
Jass was born in Ludhiana, Punjab, to businessman Gurpal Bhatia and Pinky Bhatia. His elder brother Gagan Bhatia is a commercial pilot with IndiGo. Bhatia's family moved to Delhi in 1991. He studied at Guru Nanak Public School. Bhatia comes from a non-film background and is the first one in his family to be a part of Bollywood. Bhatia uses his grandmother's first name "Jass" as his screen name.

== Career ==
Before starting his career as an actor Jass worked in several TV commercials and advertisements, including Alto K10 and Indian National Lok Dal (a Haryana political party) in 2009. He started his career as a model and participated in Singh and Kaur of the Year in 2007. In 2011 Jass played his first supporting role as Kartar, a young Sardar man in Pankaj Kapur's romantic drama film Mausam, opposite Aditi Sharma. The film received a mixed response from critics. He also acted in movies like I Don't Luv U (2013), Bhaag Milkha Bhaag (2013) and Kill Dil (2014). His television career began with Rab Se Sona Ishq in 2012 on Zee TV, followed by Firangi Bahu in 2013 on Sahara One. As of July 2015, he has completed work on Dreamspark Movies' DNA of Love, a film described as a "thriller love story", in which he will appear as Jass. The film will release next year on Valentine's Day.

== Filmography ==
Year	Film	Character
2011	Mausam (2011 film), Cinergy	Kartar
2013	I Don't Luv U – Amrapali Media Vision	Lovely
2013	Bhaag Milkha Bhaag – ROMP/ Viacom18	Mahinder
2014	Kill Dil – Yashraj Films	Chimsy
2016	DNAoflove – Dreamspark movies	Jass

== Television ==
Year	Title
2012	Rab Se Sona Ishq (TV series)
2013	Firangi Bahu (TV series)
