= Once Upon Two Times =

- Promotional poster
- Directed by: Sonakshi Mittal
- Written by: Sonakshi Mittal
- Produced by: Shashi Mittal; Sumeet Hukamchand Mittal; Ajay Rai
- Starring: Sanjay Suri; Mrinal Kulkarni; Anud Singh Dhaka; Nitesh Pandey; Kashish Khan
- Cinematography: Jayesh Nair
- Edited by: Hardik Singh Reen
- Music by: Rajat Tiwari
- Production company: Shashi Sumeet Productions
- Release date: 23 December 2023
- Country: India
- Language: Hindi

Once Upon Two Times is a 2023 Indian Hindi-language romance drama film directed and written by Sonakshi Mittal. Produced under Shashi Sumeet Productions, it stars Sanjay Suri, Mrinal Kulkarni, Anud Singh Dhaka, Nitesh Pandey and Kashish Khan. The film was premiered on ZEE5 from 23 December 2023.

== Cast ==
- Sanjay Suri as Kaushik Awasthi
- Mrinal Kulkarni as Purnima Roongta
- Anud Singh Dhaka as Ahaan Awasthi
- Nitesh Pandey as Nipun Roongta
- Kashish Khan as Ruhi Roongta

== Music ==
Once Upon Two Times

Soundtrack album by Rajat Tiwari
- Released: 26 December 2023
- Genre: Feature film soundtrack
- Length: 17:12
- Language: Hindi
- Label: Zee Music Company

Official audio
- Once Upon Two Times - Full Album on YouTube

The film has following tracks:

Track listing
No.	Title	Singer(s)	Length
1.	"Ghar Mil Gaya"	Amarabha Banerjee	4:13
2.	"Lamhe Lakhere"	Rajat Tiwari	3:19
3.	"Raah Niharu"	Suvarna Tiwari	5:27
4.	"Ghar Mil Gaya - Reprise"	Papon	4:13
Total length:			17:12

== Reception ==
Satish Sundaresan of OTTPlay rated the film 3.5/5 stars. Sonal Pandya of Times Now rated the film 2.5 stars out of 5 stars. Pushpangi Raina of Outlook India reviewed the film.
