= Sonali Nikam =

Indian television actress

Sonali Nikam (born 31 March 1992) is an Indian television actress best known for playing the lead role Jassi in her show Aadhe Adhoore, which explored infidelity in rural India. Before her breakthrough role as Jassi, she has essayed parallel lead roles in many hit TV series such as Geet Hui Sabse Parayee and Pyaar Ka Dard Hai Meetha Meetha Pyaara Pyaara.

She was most recently seen as the female lead in the & TV show Ek Vivah Aisa Bhi in 2017. in 2020 she played in Qurbaan hua as saraswati neel's sister after that she played at mauka-e-vardat and she played in Harphoul mohini show as shalini in 2022

== Television ==
Year	Show	Role	Channel	Notes
2009	Hum Dono Hain Alag Alag	Mallika	Star One	
2010	Godh Bharaai	Kavita	Sony TV	
2010	Thoda Hai Bas Thode Ki Zaroorat Hai	Devki	Colors TV	
2010–2011	Rakt Sambandh	Shraddha Deshmukh	Imagine TV	
2010–2011	Geet Hui Sabse Parayee	Naintara Singh Rathore	Star One	
2010–2011	Jaankhilavan Jasoos	Monalisa	SAB TV	
2012–2013	Hum Ne Li Hai...Shapath	Neha	Life OK	
2012–2013	Jhilmil Sitaaron Ka Aangan Hoga	Priyanka	Sahara One	
2012–2013	Kaali – Ek Punar Avatar	Sayali	Star Plus	
2013–2014	Pyaar Ka Dard Hai Meetha Meetha Pyaara Pyaara	Revati Deewan	Star Plus	
2014–2015	Lakeeren Kismat Ki	Pallavi	Doordarshan	
2014–2015	Box Cricket League 1	Contestant		
2015	Agent Raghav - Crime Branch	Akansha Arora (Ep.2)	& TV	Episodic role
2015–2016	Aadhe Adhoore	Jassi	Zindagi	
2017	Ek Vivah Aisa Bhi	Suman Parmar/Suman Mittal	& TV	
2018	Kaun Hai?		Colors TV	
2019	Laal Ishq	Episode 160	&TV	
2020–2021	Yeshu	Mary	&TV	
2021	Mauka-E-Vardaat		&TV	
2022	Harphoul Mohini	Shalini	Colors TV	
2026	Hastinapur Ke Veer	Goddess Ganga	Sony SAB	

== See also ==
- List of Indian television actresses
