= Magunira Shagada =

2002 Indian Odia-language film

- Directed by: Prafulla Mohanty
- Written by: Godabarisha Mohapatra
- Produced by: National Film Development Corporation
- Starring: Ashru Mochan Mohanty; Jaya Seal
- Cinematography: Bharat Nerkar & Brundaban Swain
- Edited by: Madan Mohan Prasad
- Music by: Amarendra Mohanty
- Distributed by: National Film Development Corporation
- Release date: 2002
- Running time: 95 minutes
- Country: India
- Language: Odia

Magunira Shagada (transl.Maguni's Bullock Cart) is a 2002 India Odia film directed by Prafulla Mohanty. It is based on a short story by Godabarisha Mahapatra. The film won the 2002 National Film Award for Best Feature Film in Odia.

== Plot ==
The plot revolves around Maguni, who owns and drives a bullock cart. His business of driving people and goods is less efficient than that of the new mini buses, and he is increasingly unable to adapt to the changing circumstances. When his wife catches an illness which she does not survive, Maguni eventually becomes insane and dies.

== Cast ==
- Ashru Mochan Mohanty as Maguni
- Jaya Seal
- Dhirendra Basa
- Nila Mani Behera
- Manorama Mohanty

== Music ==
- Music Director - Amarendra Mohanty
- Lyricist - Shirsananda Das Kanungo
- Playback - Suresh Wadkar, Amayendra Mohanty, Sweta Pan, Rudra Mohanty, Arati Goswami

== Awards and participation ==
- International Film Festival of India, 2002 (Indian Panorama section)
- National Film Awards 2002, Best Feature Film in Oriya of 2001
