= Indira Krishnan =

Indian television actress (born 1971)

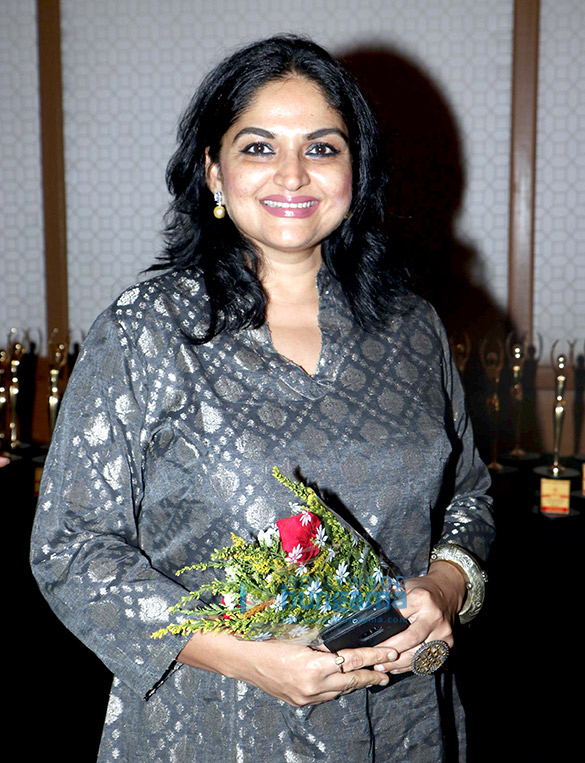
- Indira Krishnan at the All India Achievers Awards 2017
- Born: 1 March 1971 (age 55); Mumbai, Maharashtra
- Occupation: Actress
- Years active: 1995–present
- Spouse: Rajesh Ranshinage

Indira Krishnan (born 1 March 1971) is an Indian actress who primarily works in Hindi films and television shows. She is best known for her appearances in the television series Krishnaben Khakhrawala (2010) as Krishna Ravi Patel, Krishnadasi (2016) as Kumudini, with significant appearances in Manzilein Apani Apani (2001), Kabhi Aaye Na Judaai (2003), Tum Bin Jaaoon Kahaan (2003), Kahaani Ghar Ghar Kii (2005), Waaris (2008), Rahe Tera Aashirwaad (2008), Rehna Hai Teri Palkon Ki Chhaon Mein (2009), Afsar Bitiya (2011), Tum Aise Hi Rehna (2014), Firangi Bahu (2014), Kya Haal, Mr. Paanchal? (2017), Yeh Hai Chahatein (2019), and Saavi Ki Savaari (2022).

== Early and personal life ==
Indira Krishnan was born on 1 March 1971 in Mumbai, Maharashtra, of Tamil origin. She married Rajesh Ranshinage, an Indian film director.

== Career ==
=== Film ===
Indira's debut film was an Odia film, Suna Panjuri (1995), alongside Sidhant Mohapatra. She played Puja, and the film turned out to be the musical hit of the year. She appeared in Trishakti (1999) and then appeared in the film Aaj Ka Ravan (2000) with Mithun Chakraborty. Later, she appeared in films like Tere Naam (2003), Tathastu (2006), Chatur Singh Two Star (2011), and Holiday: A Soldier Is Never Off Duty (2014). She appeared in the Marathi film Janiva (2015), directed by her husband, Rajesh Ranshinage.

=== Television ===
==== 2000-2010 ====
Her significant role in television came with Kinare Milte Nahi on DD Metro in 2000. In 2001, she played the role of Nanda in the show Manzilein Apani Apani on Zee TV and appeared in Kahani Saat Pheron Ki on DD National.

From 2003 to 2010, she acted in various Television shows, with important roles in Saara Akaash (2003), Kabhi Aaye Na Judaai (2003), Tum Bin Jaaoon Kahaan (2003), Ayushmaan (2004), Kahaani Ghar Ghar Kii (2005), Ek Ladki Anjaani Si (2005), Saathii Re (2007), Waaris (2008), Rahe Tera Aashirwaad (2008) and Rehna Hai Teri Palkon Ki Chhaon Mein (2009).

==== 2010-present ====
In 2010, She starred in the show Krishnaben Khakhrawala, which aired on Sony TV and was based on Ahmedabad’s popular snack brand, Induben Khakhrawal. Indira played the titular role as Krishna Ravi Patel, receiving praise for her portrayal. She appeared in Afsar Bitiya (2011) and Firangi Bahu (2013). In 2014, she appeared in an important role in Tum Aise Hi Rehna.

In 2016, She starred in Krishnadasi (2016), which was based on the lives of the Devadasi community, playing the role of Krishnadasi Kumudini.

Other appearances during this period included Kya Haal, Mr. Paanchal? (2017), Yeh Hai Chahatein (2019), and Saavi Ki Savaari as Vedika Dalmiya.

== Filmography ==
- Note: all films are in Hindi, unless otherwise noted.

Year	Film	Role	Notes
1995	Suna Panjuri	Puja	Odia film
1999	Trishakti	Shivani	
2000	Aaj Ka Ravan	Shanti	
2003	Tere Naam	Nirjara's elder sister	
2006	Deadline: Sirf 24 Ghante	Dr. Rana	
2006	Tathastu		
2009	Team: The Force		
2011	Chatur Singh Two Star	Sonia's sister	
2014	Holiday	Saiba's mother	
2015	Janiva		Marathi film
2015	Hey Bro		
2023	Unlock Zindagi		
2023	Animal	Geetanjali's Mother	
2026	Ramayana: Part 1	Kaushalya	

== Television ==
Year	Series	Role	Notes	Ref
1997–1998	Chattaan	Rizwana Faisal Khan		
2000	Swayam Ek Ehsaas			
2000	Kinare Milte Nahi			
2001	Manzilein Apani Apani	Nanda		
2001	Kahani Saat Pheron Ki	Deepa Shekhar Sehgal		
2001	Ssshhhh...Koi Hai	Gayatri	Episode 46 season 1	
2003	Kabhie Kabhie			
2003–2004	Kabhi Aaye Na Judaai	Radhika Agnihotri		
2003–2005	Saara Akaash	Sujata Abhay Kocchar		
2003–2005	Tum Bin Jaaoon Kahaan	Vrinda Sumeet Mehra		
2004–2005	Ayushmaan			
2004–2007	Kesar	Teji		
2005	Kahaani Ghar Ghar Kii	Anjana Harpreet Gill		
2005	Ek Ladki Anjaani Si			
2005–2006	Rabba Ishq Na Hove	Kushan & Vivan's Aunt		
2006	Ssshhhh...Koi Hai	Mridula Varisht Saniyal	Episodes 194–201	
2006	Suno... Harr Dil Kuchh Kehtaa Hai	Mrs Diwakar		
2006	Purab Ya Pashchim			
2006–2007	Saathii Re			
2007–2009	Doli Saja Ke	Geeta		
2007–2008	Ardhangini	Sushmita Sen		
2008	Waaris	Yashoda Rudra Pratap Singh		
2008–2009	Rahe Tera Aashirwaad	Guru Mata		
2009–2010	Rehna Hai Teri Palkon Ki Chhaon Mein	Kadambari		
2010–2011	Krishnaben Khakhrawala	Krishna Ravi Patel		
2010	CID	Krishna Ravi Patel	Special appearance	
2010	Taarak Mehta Ka Ooltah Chashmah		Special appearance	
2011–2012	Afsar Bitiya	Ganga Tuntun Singh		
2013–2014	Firangi Bahu	Ranjan Desai		
2014	Tum Aise Hi Rehna	Rukmini Kailash Maheshwari		
2016	Comedy Nights Bachao			
2016	Krishnadasi	Krishnadasi Kumudini		
2017–2019	Kya Haal, Mr. Paanchal?	Ghazibad Wali Bua		
2019–2022	Yeh Hai Chahatein	Vasudha Srinivasan		
2022–2023	Saavi Ki Savaari	Vedika Dalmiya		
2023–2024	Dhruv Tara – Samay Sadi Se Pare	Rajmata Durgavati		
2024–2025	Durga – Atoot Prem Kahani	Paani Bai		
2025–present	Ganga Mai Ki Betiyan	Durgawati Thakur		
