= Dayasagar =

Indian Television Series

During 1996 to 1998, a 50-episodes serial titled Dayasagar, based on the 1978 film of the same name about Jesus Christ, aired on DD National. The series was also dubbed into Telugu, Tamil, Hindi, Malayalam and other languages for repeat telecasts.

Vijayachander portrayed the role of Jesus in it. He was born Vijayachander Telidevara. He is an Indian film theater actor, method actor, director and producer, predominantly appearing in Telugu cinema and South Indian films. He made his acting debut in the film Sudigundalu, which won the National Film Award for Best Feature Film in Telugu in 1967.

He is known for portraying the roles of devotional characters like Jesus and Sai Baba of Shirdi. He has acted in Telugu, Tamil and Malayalam language films. In 2007, he has donated land for old film artists and Movie Artists Association.

== See also ==
- Yeshu, another Indian TV series about Jesus
- Bible Ki Kahaniyan, an Indian TV series based on the Old Testament
