= Karishma Randhawa =

Indian actress (born 1980)

- Born: 23 May 1983 (age 42); Chandigarh, India
- Occupation(s): Actress, Entrepreneur
- Years active: 2003–2011
- Spouse: Kanwal Mookhey (m. 2007)
- Children: 1 son & 1 daughter
- Relatives: Yukta Mookhey (sister–in–law)

Karishma Mookhey (née Randhawa) is an Indian television and cinema actress.

== Career ==
Karishma started her career with the title role of Dollie in StarPlus's Hello Dollie, produced by Sagar Arts. She has acted in a movie, Perfect Husband and has presented The Will Power, a documentary for the BBC.

Karishma was seen in Sahara One's Doli Saja Ke, Woh Rehne Waali Mehlon Ki, Naaginn and a role in Lo Ho Gayi Pooja Iss Ghar Ki has been announced.

Karishma was also seen playing the role of Tara Vadhera in the 2005–06 TV show India Calling that aired on Star One. She played the role of Naintara Singh Rathore in the 2010–11 TV show Geet – Hui Sabse Parayi. But she did not continue when the role was revived after a break for her family commitments.

Since then, she has switched careers and is a partner in an information technology venture with her husband.

== Personal life ==
Randhawa married Kanwal Mookhey, a businessman involved in information technology consultancy and brother of Miss World 1999, Yukta Mookhey, on 23 September 2007. They have a daughter & a son.

== Television ==
TV shows
Year	Title	Role
2004–2005	Hello Dollie	Dollie
2004–2005	Tumhari Disha	Rano
2005–2006	Rabba Ishq Na Hove	Neha
2005–2006	Maahi Ve	Preeto
2005–2006	India Calling	Tara Vadhera
2006	Suno...Harr Dill Kuchh Kehtaa Hai	
2007	Ssshhhh...Phir Koi Hai	Meghna (Episode 19)
2007–2009	Doli Saja Ke	Riddhima
2007–2009	Rakhi	Cameo role
2008	Pyar Ishq Aur Mohabat	
2010–2011	Geet – Hui Sabse Parayi	Naintara Singh Rathore
