= Yeshu (TV series) =

Indian television series

- Genre: Drama
- Created by: Arvind Babbal
- Written by: Rekha Babbal
- Directed by: Arvind Babbal
- Starring: Vivaan Shah; Sonali Nikam; Aarya Dharmchand Kumar; Rudra Soni
- Country of origin: India
- Original language: Hindi
- No. of seasons: 1
- No. of episodes: 84

Production
- Producer: Arvind Babbal
- Camera setup: Multi-camera
- Running time: 20–24 minutes
- Production company: Arvind babbal productions

Original release
- Network: &TV
- Release: 22 December 2020 – 16 April 2021

Yeshu is an Indian Hindi-language drama television series broadcasting on &TV. It premiered on 22 December 2020 and produced by Arvind Babbal. It starring Sonali Nikam, Aarya Dharmchand Kumar and Vivaan Shah.

== Plot ==
The series depicts the childhood of Yeshu Masih (Jesus Christ). This series showcases Yeshu's miracles and how he helped people with his healing powers in a world afflicted by sins and evil. The show also focusses on Yeshu's special bond with his mother.

== Cast ==
=== Main ===
- Vivaan Shah as Yeshu
- Sonali Nikam as Mary
- Aarya Dharmchand Kumar as Joseph
- Rudra Soni as King Antipas

=== Recurring ===
- Giriraj Kabra as Devtoot
- Pooja Dixit as Maria
- Vikey Ahuja as Rabbi Guru
- Sarthak Mohan Chorghe as James
- Misha Krishna Kataria as Ashiya
- Khabir Mehta as Yakub
- Tanishq Jain as Simon
- Pushkar Priyadarshi as Mannu's father
- Ankit Arora as Shaitaan

== Production ==
Arvind Babbal's series was supposed to premiere in March 2020. However, owing COVID-19 outbreak, the production and filming of television series were stalled. But, due to imposed lockdown which extended, it could not be resumed. When the shootings of the series were permitted from October 2020, the production and filming of the series resumed and the team decides to release the series in December. But finally the series premiered on 22 December 2020. It produced by Arvind Babbal, through his studio, Arvind Babbal Productions.

== See also ==
- Dayasagar, another Indian TV series about Jesus
- Bible Ki Kahaniyan, an Indian TV series based on the Old Testament
