= Rudra Soni =

Indian Television Actor

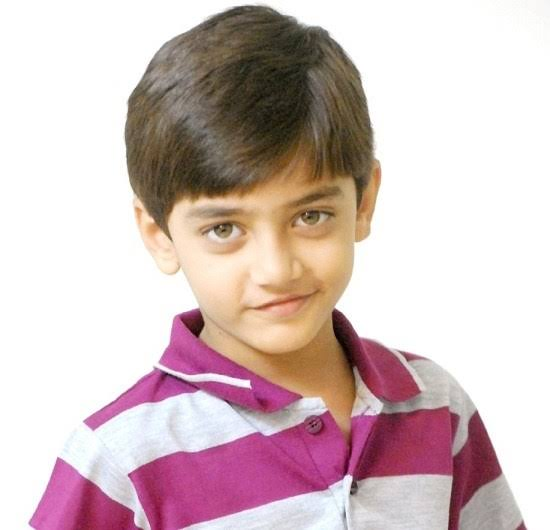
- Rudra Soni in 2012
- Born: 10 November 2004 (age 21); India
- Occupation: Actor
- Years active: 2007–present
- Known for: Baal Veer; Peshwa Bajirao

Rudra Soni (born 10 November 2004) is an Indian television actor known for portraying the role of Manav in the children fantasy television show, Baalveer and Bajirao in Indian Historical Television series Peshwa Bajirao.

== Career ==
Rudra started his career with the show Kahiin to Hoga. In 2012, he became popular playing Manav in the TV serial Baalveer. He also played Bajirao in the drama Peshwa Bajirao and King Antipas in television series Yeshu.

In 2015, he appeared in the Bollywood film Bajirao Mastani featuring Ranveer Singh.

== Filmography ==
=== Television ===
Year	Title	Role	Notes	Ref.
2007	Kahin Toh Hoga	Roshan Raheja		
2009	Taarak Mehta Ka Ooltah Chashmah	Banti/Yash		
2011–2013	Balikha Vadhu	Varun Singh		
2012–2016	Baalveer	Manav/Baal Mitra	Main Character	
2017	Peshwa Bhajirao	Young Pesha Bhajirao	Lead Character	
2018	Karn Sangini	Young Karna		
2019	Achanak Uss Roz	Chote Chaudhary		
2019	Crime Alert	Episodic Role		
2019	Vikram Betaal Ki Rahasya Gatha	Ekalavya		
2020–2021	Yeshu	King Antipas		
2021	Paapnashini Ganga	Rishi Markandeya		
2023	Swaraj	Wazir Ali	Episode 19	
2023	Bekaboo	Teenage Pratham		
2024	Fauji 2	Harun Malik		

=== Films ===
Year	Title	Role	Notes	Ref.
2015	Bajirao Mastani	Young Nana Saheb		
2018	Tumbbad	Sadashiv		
2019	Laal Kaptaan	Young Gossain		
2019	Sye Raa Narasimha Reddy	Young Narasimha Reddy	Telugu film	
2020	Torbaaz	Gulaab		
2022	Shamshera	Pitamber		
2026	Raja Shivaji	Young Sambhaji Shahaji Bhosale	Bilingual film	

=== Web Series ===
Year	Title	Role	Ref.
2022	Chhatrasal	Young Maharaja Chhatrasal	
2024	Scammy Boys	Piyush	
