= Kanika Maheshwari =

Indian television actress (born 1981)

Kanika Maheshwari Ghai
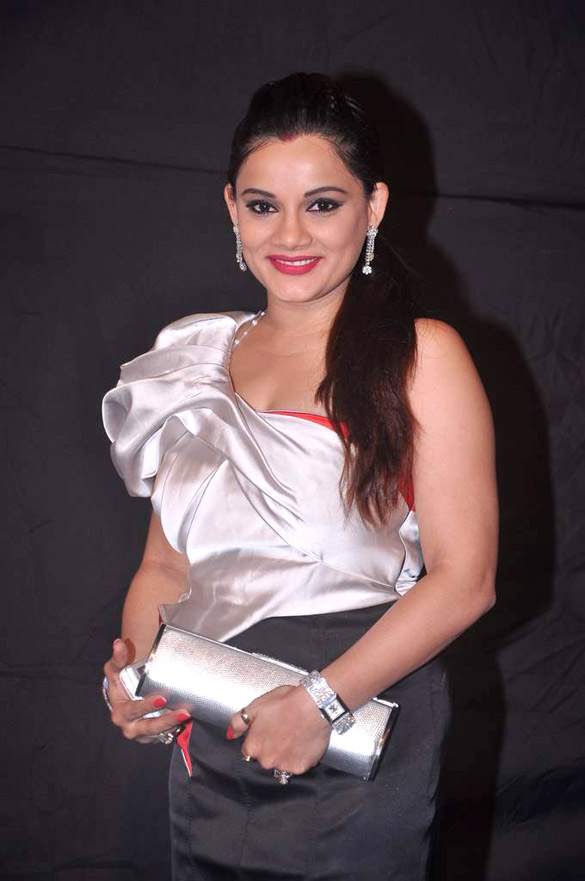
- Maheshwari at Colors' Indian Telly Awards, 2012
- Born: 24 April 1981 (age 45); Aligarh, Uttar Pradesh, India
- Occupation: Actress
- Years active: 2001–present
- Spouse: Ankur Ghai (m. 2012)
- Children: 1
- Website: kanikamaheshwari.com

Kanika Maheshwari Ghai (née Maheshwari; born 24 April 1981) is an Indian television actress. She is best known for her roles in serials like Kahaani Ghar Ghar Kii, Raja Ki Aayegi Baraat, Kabhi Aaye Na Judaai, Viraasat, Geet - Hui Sabse Parayi, Diya Aur Baati Hum and Seher – Hone Ko Hai. Kanika won Zee Gold Awards (2012-2013). She reprised her role of Meenakshi Vikram Rathi in the sequel of Diya Aur Baati Hum, Tu Sooraj, Main Saanjh Piyaji.

== Early life ==
Maheshwari was born in a Marwari Maheshwari Family. She is an Indian Television actor and has made appearances as varied characters of the years. She was born in Aligarh from where her family moved to New Delhi, she is the only child of her parents. After her graduation, she learned the fine art of Vaastu Shastra and Color Therapy before dabbling into acting. At the academy she learned performing arts and experimented with her talents, she was encouraged by her teachers and mentors to find her place in Mumbai and create a niche for herself in the industry. Kanika followed the advice, culminating in her streak of award-winning roles and shows over the years. Known for her hard work, punctuality and persistence – her cheerful spirit brings new shades to Evalys.

== Personal life ==
Kanika married businessman Ankur Ghai in January 2012. She gave birth to a boy in April 2015.

== Filmography ==
=== Television ===
Year	Title	Role	Notes
2001–2002	Kabhi Aaye Na Judaai		Debut role
2002-2003	Lipstick		
2004–2005	Kahaani Ghar Ghar Kii	Neelima Garg	
2004–2005	Hey...Yehii To Haii Woh!	Shahana	
2005	Reth		
2005	Kkavyanjali		
2005	Piya Ka Ghar	Mantara	
2006	Ek Ladki Anjaani Si		
2006	Viraasat	Juhi Lamba	
2006	India Calling	Ami	
2007	Sinndoor Tere Naam Ka	Sneha	
2007	Dill Mill Gayye	Maya	
2007	F.I.R.	Various characters	
2007-2008	Doli Saja Ke	Sukanya Singhania	
2008–2010	Raja Ki Aayegi Baraat	Princess Bhoomi	
2009	Shaurya Aur Suhani	Princess Mallika	
2010	Geet	Sasha	
2011–16	Diya Aur Baati Hum	Meenakshi Rathi	won best actress in negative role(Zee Gold Awards - 2012,13 & Indian Telly Awards 2012)
2013	Nach Baliye 6		Contestant with Ankur Ghai
2017	Dil Se Dil Tak	Madamji	Cameo
2017	Tu Sooraj, Main Saanjh Piyaji	Meenakshi Rathi	
2021	Kyun Utthe Dil Chhod Aaye	Mogar	
2022–2023	Dil Diyaan Gallaan	Nimrit Randeep Brar	
2026	Seher – Hone Ko Hai	Husnara Niyazi	

=== Web series ===
Year	Title	Role	Notes
2019	BOSS: Baap of Special Services	Safia	

== Awards ==
For the role of Meenakshi Rathi in Diya Aur Baati Hum, Maheshwari has won following awards.

Year	Award ceremony	Category	Result
2012	Gold Awards	Best actress in a negative role	Won
2012	Indian Telly Awards	Best actress in a negative role	Won
2013	Gold Awards	Best actress in a negative role	Won
