= India Calling =

- Written by: Smita Nair Jain
- Music by: Abhijeet Hegdepatil
- Opening theme: "India Calling"
- No. of seasons: 1
- No. of episodes: 181

Production
- Running time: approx. 22 minutes
- Production company: Rose Audiovisuals

Original release
- Network: Star One
- Release: 14 November 2005 – 5 October 2006

India Calling is an Indian television series that aired on Star One from 14 November 2005 to 5 October 2006. It stars Manasi Parekh, Pankit Thakker and Vipul Gupta in lead roles. The series is about a Punjabi girl named Chandni who worked in an international call centre.

Audience research conducted by Star One suggested that viewers "didn't like the idea of a heroine who 'talked back'". Although India Calling was flopped in the ratings and was canceled after one season, the show made Manasi Parekh a household name in India.

== Plot ==
Chandni is the middle class girl living in Jalandhar who adores her elder sister, Mini Didi / Manisha Kapoor. Manisha is working in Mumbai as a call centre executive. Due to Manisha's absence on her engagement, Chandni gets engaged with Dilawar. But before marriage, she decides to go to Mumbai, to experience the famed city life, and meet her Mini Didi. But, being unable to find Manisha, she decides to take up the job at the call center, India calling, in her sister's search. Meanwhile after an initial hate relationship, she fall in love with Aditya, the owner of the call center. She is unaccustomed to the nonstop pace of city life. The show follows Chandni's struggles in life while working in a call center and trying to find her sister, Mini Didi / Manisha Kapoor.

== Cast ==
- Manasi Parekh as Chandni Kapoor
- Pankit Thakker as Shantanu "Shanty"
- Raj Singh Verma as Boss
- Keerti Gaekwad Kelkar as Manisha "Mini" Kapoor
- Vipul Gupta as Aditya Khanna
- Nigaar Khan as Kamini Khanna
- Anang Desai as Mr. Kapoor
- Himani Shivpuri as Lajoji
- Rushad Rana as Dilawar
- Karishma Randhawa as Tara Vadhera
- Ayub Khan as Mr. Khanna (Kamini's husband and Aditya's elder brother)
- Gulfam Khan as Sunita
- Kanika Maheshwari as Ami
- Ashish Kapoor
