= Sujata (TV series) =

- Promotional logo
- Also known as: Sujata - Ek Stree Ka Samarpan
- Created by: BR Films
- Written by: Meenakshi Gupta, Uddeept Dutt Gaur
- Directed by: Anil V Kumar; Saagar Kagra
- Opening theme: "Sujata" Sound: Thompson Peter; Music: Lalit Sen; Lyrics: Nawaab Aarzoo
- Country of origin: India
- No. of episodes: 128

Production
- Producers: B.R. Chopra; Ravi Chopra
- Running time: 23 minutes

Original release
- Network: Sony TV
- Release: 14 April – 11 December 2008

Sujata - Ek Stree Ka Samarpan is a Hindi television serial that aired on Sony Entertainment Television, starting from 14 April 2008 until 11 December 2008. The story is an adaptation of the Mexican telenovela Piel de Otono, (Autumn Love), which was written by Liliana Abud and produced by Televisa. It brings out the emotions of an urban married woman and her relationship with her husband and children.

== Plot ==
The story is based on the life of a married woman name Sujata who has had a love marriage with her husband, Viresh. She is also blessed with two children, but now at the age of 40 she starts to realize that her family has taken her for granted and wants to find her own way to live life.

The story begins by focusing on the life of the main protagonist Sujata who has nothing more important than to take care of her family. So taking charge of her home and family, she sacrifices her own dreams and aspirations as well as her youth for the sake of the family members without expecting anything in return. Being a complete housewife as most other women, she has forgotten her own identity and needs, but as time passes by she faces her midlife crisis. Despite being so close to her family members, Sujata feels lonely because now the same family who she was taking care of more than herself get involved in their own routine and have no time for her. At this point of her life she is faced with the truth where her children have grown up and they have their own priorities and have little or no time for her. Her relationship with her husband, who is making a name for himself in the corporate world, has become more of a habit. Today, her well-protected and nurtured nest is empty. She finds herself alone despite being the building block of her family. Why is she alone now when she needs her family the most? Why is there nobody, when she has given everything to the family?

== Cast ==
- Indrani Haldar ... Sujata Shah (Main protagonist)
- Aman Verma as Viresh Shah (Sujata's husband, false protagonist)
- Sheeba Akashdeep ... Roshni (Sujata's best friend)
- Ravee Gupta ... Menka (Viresh's best friend/co-worker)
- Divya Jagdale ... Shaila (Sujata's other best friend)
- Shweta Mahadik ... Saara Shah (Sujata's naughty daughter, antagonist)
- Brijesh Arya ... Sameer/Sam Shah (Sujata's son)
- Ajay Chaudhary ... Jatin (Shaila's son who loves Sujata's daughter Saara)
- Parmeet Sethi ... Kabir (Sujata's college friend/ex-lover)
- Hasan Zaidi / Farhan Siddiqui ... Neel (Saara's boyfriend who is after her dad's money, antagonist)
- Renuka Israni ... Faiba/Maa (Viresh's mother, antagonist)
- Kiran Bhargava ... Kokila Masi (Shah family's maid who is like a family member, supports Sujata)
- Puja Joshi ... Tina (Shaila's daughter)
- Surendra Pal ... M.D. Shah (Viresh's father)
- Beena ... Rukmani Shah (Viresh's mother)
- Mreenal Deshraj ... Sejal (Faiba's daughter, antagonist)
- Jiten Mukhi ... Jignesh (Sejal's husband who supports her in bad deeds, antagonist)
