= Kabhi Aaye Na Judaai =

Indian drama television series

- Written by: S.Farhan; Shobhit Jaiswal; Diya Limaye; Barry Dhillon
- Directed by: Santosh Bhatt
- Starring: see below
- Country of origin: India
- No. of episodes: 340

Production
- Producer: Deepti Bhatnagar
- Running time: 26 minutes

Original release
- Network: Star Plus
- Release: 27 January 2003 – 4 November 2004

Kabhi Aaye Na Judaai (English: "Let separation never come") is an Indian Hindi soap opera on Star Plus. It is a story of a united family which finds itself confronted with the biggest temptation of all times - money.

== Plot ==
The story deals with the problems that money brings to a family along with changing the fabric of their relationships. How a happy family breaks down due to the temptation that money brings. The series focuses on how the relationship between Rajeshwar and Radhika changes despite it surviving the tests of time, and on the story of Kanya and how her life changes after marriage.

== Cast ==
- Pamela Mukherjee / Aanchal Anand / Pooja Ghai Rawal as Kanya Malhotra (2003) / (2003) / (2004)
- Tarun Khanna as Sameer
- Prabhat Bhattacharya as Dev
- Nasir Khan as Siddharth Khurana
- Indira Krishnan as Radhika
- Ram Kapoor as Rajeshwar Agnihotri
- Harsh Somaiya / Aamir Dalvi as Aditya
- Amit Varma as Rahul
- Kapil Soni as Shiv
- Nisha Sareen as Raveena
- Vishal Watwani
- Shilpa Shinde
- Jaya Bhattacharya
- Kanika Maheshwari
- Sanjeev Tyagi
