= Doli Saja Ke =

Indian drama television series (2007-2009)

- Written by: Bhavna Vyas, Saba Mumtaz
- Directed by: Dev Dutt, Manesh Om Singhania
- Starring: See below
- Opening theme: "Doli Saja Ke" by Richa Sharma
- Country of origin: India
- No. of seasons: 1
- No. of episodes: 632

Production
- Producer: Aruna Irani
- Running time: approximately 22 minutes
- Production company: AK Films

Original release
- Network: Sahara One
- Release: 7 May 2007 – 13 November 2009

Babul Ki Bitiya Chali Doli Saja Ke is a Hindi language Indian soap opera that aired on Sahara One channel worldwide. The series premiered on 7 May 2007 and ended on 13 November 2009.

== Cast ==
=== Main ===
- Barkha Bisht as
  - Anupama Kapoor / Anupama Chaitanya Shekhawat / Anupama Daksh Singhania: Vikram and Kiran's daughter; Maya's stepdaughter; Tiya's twin sister; Riddhima and Veer's elder stepsister; Chaitanya's widow; Daksh's wife; Anubhav's stepmother (2007–2009)
  - Tiya Kapoor: Vikram and Kiran's daughter; Maya's stepdaughter; Anupama's twin sister; Riddhima and Veer's elder stepsister; Arjun's girlfriend (2008–2009)
- Indraneil Sengupta as Daksh Singhania: Devraj and Narayani's younger grandson; Dhananjay's younger stepbrother; Rupali and Diya's ex boyfriend; Anupama's husband; Anubhav's father (2007–2009)

=== Recurring ===
- Ravi Dubey / Unknown as Veer Kapoor: Vikram and Maya's son; Kiran's stepson; Riddhima's younger brother; Anupama's younger stepbrother; Namrata's husband; (2007) / (2007; 2008)
- Roma Bali as Meera Dhananjay Singhania: Dhananjay's wife; Ishaani's mother; (2007–2009)
- Nimai Bali as Dhananjay Singhania: Daksh's elder stepbrother Meera's husband; Ishaan's father (2007–2009)
- Yash Sinha as Ishaan Singhania: Dhananjay and Meera's son; Riddhima's husband (2008–2009)
- Karishma Randhawa as Riddhima Kapoor / Riddhima Ishaan Singhania: Vikram and Maya's daughter; Kiran's stepdaughter; Veer's elder sister; Anupama's younger stepsister; Ishaan's wife (2007–2009)
- Sangeeta Ghosh as
  - Aditi Chaitanya Shekhawat: Chaitanya's first wife (2007) (Dead)
  - Neha: An actress; Aditi's lookalike (2007)
- Alihassan Turabi as
  - Mohit Verma: Riddhima's ex–boyfriend (2007)
  - Advocate Aditya Gujral (2008)
- Anuj Saxena / Akshay Anand as Vikram Kapoor: Kiran's widower; Maya's husband; Anupama, Tiya, Riddhima and Veer's father; Viren's best friend (2007) / (2007–2009)
- Surbhi Tiwari as Kiran Vikram Kapoor: Vikram's first wife; Anupama and Tiya's mother; Riddhima and Veer's stepmother (2007) (Dead)
- Jividha Sharma as Diya: Daksh's ex–girlfriend (2008)
- Jaya Mathur as Maya Vikram Kapoor: Vikram's second wife; Riddhima and Veer's mother; Anupama and Tiya's stepmother; Kanta's daughter (2007–2009)
- Sulakshana Khatri as Kanta (2007–2009)
- Adita Wahi as Namrata Veer Kapoor (2007)
- Aruna Irani as Narayani Devraj Singhania (2007–2009)
- Master Mohd Sami Shaikh as Anubhav Singhania (2009)
- Amit Sarin as Chaitanya Shekhawat (2007)
- Prabhat Bhattacharya as Indrajeet Shekhawat (2007)
- Mahru Sheikh as Sharada Ravi Shekhawat (2007)
- Mrinal Deshraj as Padmini Indrajeet Shekhawat (2007)
- Amar Upadhyay as Samar (2009)
- Ansha Sayed as Namrata Veer Kapoor (2007)
- Sonia Singh as Juhi (Ved's wife) (2007–2008)
- Manoj Bidwai as Ved (2007–2008)
- Shriya Bisht as Rupali Agnihotri / Rupali Daksh Singhania (2009)
- Manish Khanna as Viren (2007–2008)
- Manisha Kanojia as Veena (2007–2008)
- Vishal Watwani as Rahul Sanyal
- Kiran Kumar as Ravi Shekhawat (2007)
- Amrapali Gupta as Riya (2007)
- Rajesh Jais as Riya's Father
- Siddharth Dhawan as Anand (2008)
- Vandana Lalwani as Sayali (2008)
- Rammohan Sharma as Badri (2007–2008)
- Ashwin Kaushal as Advocate Shyam Munshi (2008)
- Varun Khandelwal as Padmini's Elder Brother (2007)
- Kanika Maheshwari / Nidhi Uttam as Sukanya Singhania (2007–2008) / (2008)
- Apara Mehta as Rukhsar (2007)
- Indira Krishnan as Geeta: Ravi's girlfriend; Chaitanya's mother (2007) (Dead)
- Namrata Thapa
- Rupa Divetia
- Pankaj Bhatia
- Shahab Khan
