= Someone Somewhere =

Someone Somewhere is a certified B Corporation that works with 273 artisans in 13 communities across 7 states in Mexico to produce sustainable goods that help artisans earn a living wage. The company has a goal of improving the economy and general well-being of communities by bridging the gap between local artisans and eco-friendly products.

== History ==
Someone Somewhere was founded in 2016 by three friends, Antonio Nuño, Fatima Alvarez, and Enrique Rodriguez, inspired by their time spent volunteering in rural, indigenous communities in Mexico. During these trips they realized many artisans were struggling to make a living through their crafts, and they wanted to do something to support them and improve their quality of life.

In 2022, a partnership with Delta Air Lines generated thousands of hours of work for artisans and reduced Delta’s use of plastics. With the help of AI, Someone Somewhere designed new concepts showing what artisan-made products could look like which led to new partnerships and expanded their reach.

== Business model ==
Someone Somewhere utilized non-traditional capital raising: they crowdfunded $100,00 in capital from 2,874 people via Kiva. Someone Somewhere works in collaboration with artisans who guide product design, provides them with materials, and supports them to create their crafts at home, relying on local factories for assembly.

== Products ==
Someone Somewhere is a corporation in the apparel industry in the manufacturing sector. The products made by Someone Somewhere are designed for "conscious globetrotters." Artisans sign the products they make with information about where they're from.

== Impact and recognition ==
The organization began from a crowdfunding campaign and has grown to work with artisans in Peru and launch sales in the United States. Someone Somewhere became a Certified B Corporation in August 2017. They collaborated with Adidas on a special collection of Mexico soccer jerseys for the 2024 Copa America tournament. Artisans from Puebla, Mexico, hand embroidered each jersey for over 11 hours to represent each of the players and celebrate Mexican heritage.

Artisans who work with Someone Somewhere earn wages higher than the national standard and have increased their monthly income by 300%.
