= Tathastu =

- Directed by: Anubhav Sinha
- Written by: Yash Keswani
- Based on: John Q (2002) by James Kearns
- Produced by: Nitin Manmohan
- Starring: Sanjay Dutt; Ameesha Patel; Jaya Prada; Gulshan Grover
- Cinematography: Ravi Walia
- Edited by: Sanjib Datta
- Music by: Songs: Vishal–Shekhar; Background Score: Ranjit Barot
- Production company: Karma Entertainment
- Release date: 12 May 2006
- Running time: 113 minutes
- Country: India
- Language: Hindi

Tathastu (English: So be it) is a 2006 Indian Hindi-language drama film directed by Anubhav Sinha, starring Sanjay Dutt and Ameesha Patel in the lead roles. It is based on the 2002 American film John Q.

== Plot ==
Ravi Rajput comes from a poor family; his father was a foreman at a mill and could not afford to send Ravi to a private school. Ravi studied in a municipal school, got a job in a mill, and married Saru, who subsequently gave birth to their son, Gaurav. The proud parents watch as Gaurav grows up, starting walking, talking, and feigning illness just to stay home and watch World Cup Cricket. Their lives are turned upside down when Gaurav faints while playing cricket.

They take him to the nearest hospital in Bandra, where Doctors Nita and Sen inform them that their son is dying and will not survive unless he receives a heart transplant, the cost of which is 15 lakhs rupees. A heart is available for transplant, but the hospital will only perform the surgery on receipt of the money. A desperate Ravi turns to his insurance company, which declines to renew his policy, citing an obscure clause; his employer, with whom he has worked for over 11 years, refuses to sanction above Rs.75000/-.

When nothing works out and Dr. Sen informs Ravi that his son will soon be discharged and will probably die soon after, he gets a gun and holds 30 people hostage in the hospital until the doctor agrees to operate on his son. DCP Rane is assigned to this matter, and his orders are to kill Ravi and end this drama. Meanwhile, the hostages realize how good a man Ravi is when he lets a pregnant woman deliver with full medical care, helps a woman facing domestic abuse, as well as an elderly gentleman whose son values money more than his father. Outside, he becomes a dark hero when the media reports that he is doing it to save his son, with a huge crowd gathering in his support.

But Ravi persists and is finally told that Gaurav will soon be operated upon. Relieved, Ravi decides to release all the hostages. He then sees that while a surgery is taking place, it is of an elderly politician (the President of the ruling political party, Narayan Swami) rather than his son. In desperation, he decides to end his life and give his heart to his son. After meeting his son for a few moments, he walks out with the hostages (who have all decided to support him) and his wife and proclaims to the world that he will end his life and give his heart to his son.

As he is about to shoot himself, the deputy leader of the ruling political party comes and asks him to listen to him. He informs him he has spoken to the President, who has decided to forgo his life since he loves children, requesting that the heart be given to the child. He assures Ravi that it is true and also that the party will take care of all the expenses of the operation. The entire crowd applauds the deputy leader, and Ravi lowers his gun. When the deputy leader's assistant comes to him and inquires (in a whisper) urgently what will happen to the President, and that the President said no such thing, the deputy leader tells him that this is politics. If they had operated and saved the President's life, then this entire crowd who is pro-Ravi would have thrown them out of power. Now, by sacrificing the President, they have gained huge popular support and will win the next elections.

Ravi is arrested and taken to court. The judge takes a very lenient view of the situation based on the hostages' evidence and sentences Ravi to a light sentence of six months. DCP Rane leads the applause from the entire court as Ravi looks on. The film ends with Gaurav playing cricket and his parents watching him.

== Cast ==
- Sanjay Dutt as Ravi Rajput, a foreman workshop who desperate hospital for Gaurav
- Ameesha Patel as Sarita R. Rajput, wife Ravi
- Jaya Prada as Dr. Nita,
- Gulshan Grover as DCP Rane, a veteran Mumbai Police negotiator
- Darshan Jariwala as Hospital Dean
- Manoj Pahwa as Hospital Attendant
- Yash Pathak as Gaurav R. Rajput
- Indira Krishnan as Victimized Sister
- Mukesh Rawal as Hospital Director
- Anup Soni as Police Inspector
- Lalit Tiwari as Politician
- Ravi Jhankal as Union Leader

== Music ==
Song title	Singer(s)
"Safed Lamho Me Rang Bar De" (Allah-o-ali)	Humsar Hayat
"Allah-o-ali" (Remix)	Humsar Hayat
"Alee Alee"	Sudha Malhotra
"Tere Husn Ka Jadu"	Iqbal Sabri, Afzal Sabri
"Mubaarak Eid Mubarak"	Sonu Nigam, Sneha Pant
"Ek Mulakat Zaruri Hai"	Amin Sabri, Farid Sabri
"Mere Sath Chalte Chalte"	Sunidhi Chauhan, Shaan, Krishna Beura
"Teri Jawani Mast Mast"	Iqbal Sabri, Afzal Sabri, Anupama Deshpande

== Reception ==
Taran Adarsh of Bollywood Hungama gave the film 1.5 out of 5, writing, "On the whole, Tathastu is a real story which tends to get unreal as it progresses. At the box office, the lack of hype coupled with dull merits will make it go unnoticed." Diganta Guha of Hindustan Times wrote: "The problem with Sinha’s films post Tum Bin is poor planning. His films have the ingredients but not the spices to make them palatable." Patcy N of Rediff.com gave the film 2 stars out of 5, stating, "All in all, this one's worth a miss."
