= Alok Kumar =

Alok Kumar may refer to:

- Alok Kumar Shakya (born 1972), Indian member of the 14th, 15th and Sixteenth Legislative Assembly of Uttar Pradesh in India
- Alok Kumar (singer) (born 1986), Indian actor and singer
- Alok Kumar Mehta (born 1966), Indian politician from the state of Bihar
- Alok Kumar Rai (born 1976), professor at BHU and VC of Lucknow University
- Alok Kumar Ghosh (born 2021), Indian politician from the state of Assam
- Alok Kumar Suman, Indian politician
- Alok Kumar Majhi, Indian politician member of All India Trinamool Congress
- Alok Kumar Chaurasiya, Indian politician and an MLA elected from Daltonganj block of Jharkhand state as a member of Bharatiya Janata Party 2019
