= Amarendra Mohanty =

Indian music composer (1958–2021)

- ଅମରେନ୍ଦ୍ର ମହାନ୍ତି
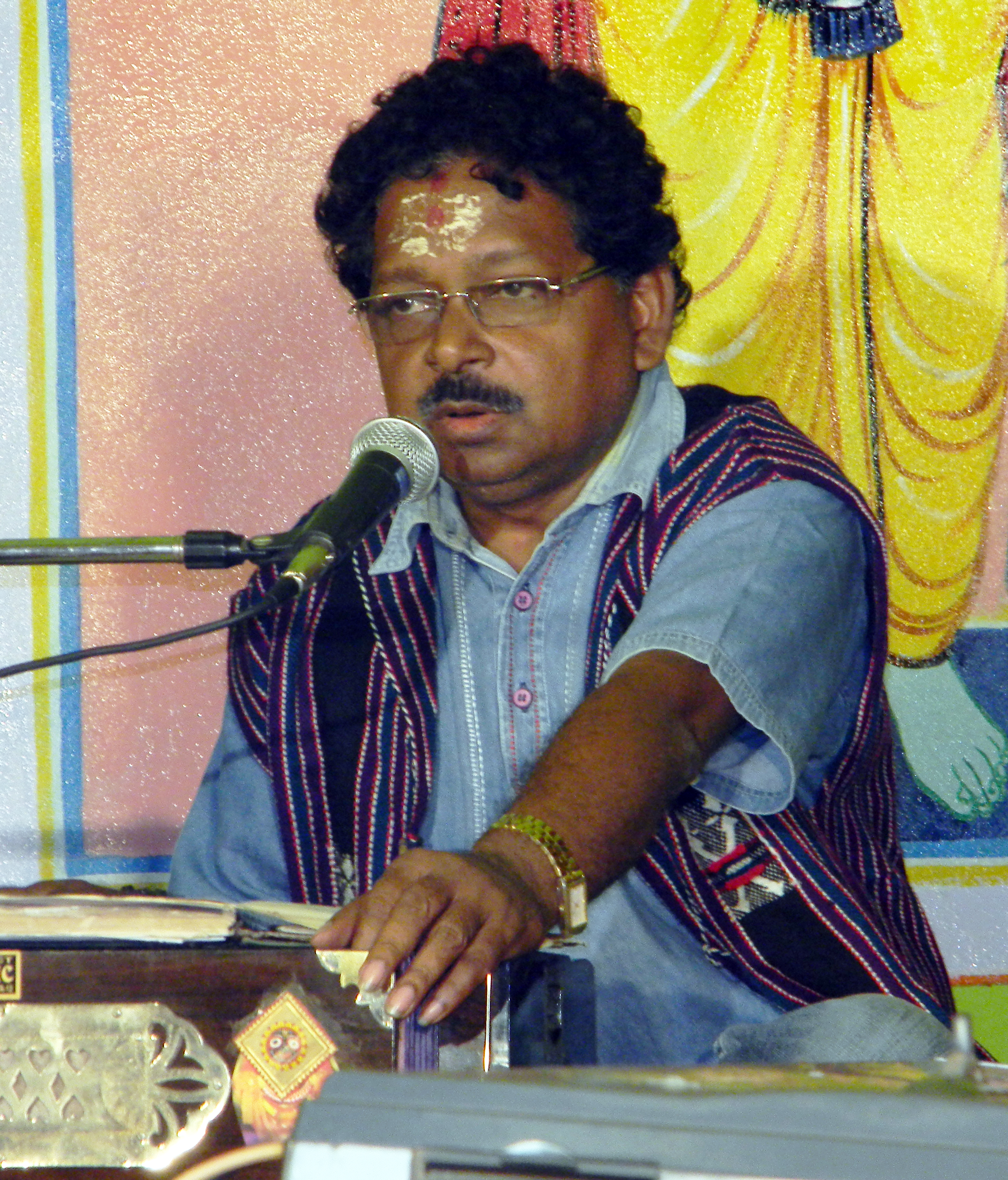
- Born: 6 February 1958; Kendrapara district, Odisha
- Died: 17 May 2021 (aged 63); Bhubaneswar
- Other names: Bulu Bhai
- Known for: Odia music director and singer
- Children: 1

Amarendra Mohanty (Odisha: ଅମରେନ୍ଦ୍ର ମହାନ୍ତି; 6 February 1958 – 17 May 2021) was an Indian music composer and singer who mainly worked in Odia film and television industry.

== Personal life ==
Amarendra was born on 6 February 1958 in Kendrapara district of Odisha, India. He died on 17 May 2021, from COVID-19 related issues during the pandemic in India.

== Career ==
Mohanty started his musical career with Akashvani Cuttack. Later he started singing in different Odia films. In 1993 he started his career as a music director through the Odia movie Shradhanjali. Later he worked in films like Magunira Shagada, Suna Panjuri, Sarapancha Babu, Bhai Hela Bhagari, Stree, Kandhei Akhire Luha, etc. His last film as a music director was Ranga Barasiba Tupuru Tupuru released in 2019.
