= Piyush Sahdev =

Indian television actor (born 1982)

- Born: 12 March 1982 (age 44)
- Occupation: Actor
- Years active: 2004–present
- Spouse: Akangsha Rawat (m. 2012; sep. 2017)
- Relatives: Gireesh Sahdev (brother); Meher Vij (sister)

Piyush Sahdev (born 12 March 1982) is an Indian television actor. He has appeared in several TV daily soaps but is known for his roles of Rama in Devon Ke Dev...Mahadev, Abhigyan in SuperCops Vs SuperVillains, Kabir Tripathi in Sapne Suhane Ladakpan Ke, Pawan Bakshi inDevanshi and Samay in Beyhadh. He is the brother of popular actors, Meher Vij and Gireesh Sahdev.

== Early life ==
Sahdev was born on 12 March 1982 and hails from Delhi. Piyush has a younger sister Vaishali aka Meher Vij. His brother Gireesh Sahdev is also an actor.

== Personal life ==
On 25 June 2012, Sahdev married actress and friend Akangsha Rawat. In mid-2017, Sahdev and his wife Akangsha Rawat were separated.

On 24 November 2017, Sahdev was arrested after a woman lodged an FIR at the Versova Police Station, Mumbai accusing him of rape.

== Career ==
=== Early days (2004–12) ===
Before making his official debut in Indian television, Sahdev did an episodic role in 2004 for Special Squad, a crime thriller on Star One. After three years he was selected to play a supporting role from 2007 to 2009 in Ghar Ek Sapnaa on Sahara One as Sharad Chatterjee, the brother of the female lead. Also he appeared as Varun Ranawat in the Zee TV series Har Ghar Kuch Kehta Hai from 2007 to 2008.

Sahdev's first leading role as Kulwant Singh, an army officer came in 2008 came with Meet Mila De Rabba on Sony TV opposite Surilie Gautam. It went off air in 2009. He next did a cameo appearance for Gul Khan's first production Geet in 2010 as Arjun Singh Rathore. From 2011-2012 he portrayed his first negative character of Aman Mathur in the popular hit show Mann Kee Awaaz Pratigya on Star Plus.

=== Success and further works (2012–present) ===
In 2012, Sahdev signed Hum Ne Li Hai... Shapath, a crime detective series on Life OK in which he played the role of Senior Inspector Abhigyan Mitra.

Sahdev quit Hum Ne Li Hai... Shapath in 2013. Later that year, he rise to prominence with his portrayal of Lord Rama opposite Rubina Dilaik in the highly acclaimed mythological drama Devon Ke Dev...Mahadev on Life OK, which marked a turning point in his career, making it his breakthrough performance. In an interview, he had already stated that he always wished to once play Rama in his career, which he eventually fulfilled and also won immense recognition for the same. He also played the lead role of Kabir in Zee TV's Sapne Suhane Ladakpan Ke.

In December 2017, Sahdev entered Sony TV's Beyhadh as Samay, a negative role which garnered him much appreciation. In the same year, Sahdev joined Colors TV's Devanshi. In 2018, he played the role of Siraj in Zee TV's Ishq Subhan Allah. He also portrayed the role of Abu Fazl in Colors TV's Dastaan-E-Mohabbat: Salim Anarkali.

In September 2021, Sahdev appeared as Inspector Piyush in &TV's Mauka-E-Vardaat. In April 2022, he was in Sony TV's show Bade Achhe Lagte Hain 2 as Krish Dixit. In 2024, he playing Arya in Dangal TV's Nath after a two year television hiatus. In March 2025, he enter as Sidharth in StarPlus show Jhanak.

== Filmography ==
=== Television ===
Year	Title	Role	Notes	Ref.
2004	Special Squad	Bobby		
2007–2009	Ghar Ek Sapnaa	Sharad Chatterjee		
2007–2008	Har Ghar Kuch Kehta Hai	Varun Ranawat		
2008–2009	Meet Mila De Rabba	Kulwant Singh		
2010	Geet	Arjun Singh Rathore	Cameo	
2010–2011	Mann Kee Awaaz Pratigya	Advocate Aman Mathur		
2012–2013	Hum Ne Li Hai... Shapath	Senior Inspector Abhigyan		
2013	Devon Ke Dev...Mahadev	Lord Rama		
2013–2015	Sapne Suhane Ladakpan Ke	Kabeer Tripathi		
2014	Encounter	Inspector Anil Barve		
2016	Beyhadh	Rajeev Randhawa/Samay Ahuja		
2016	Devanshi	Pavan Bakshi		
2018	Ishq Subhan Allah	Siraj Ahmed		
2018–2019	Dastaan-E-Mohabbat: Salim Anarkali	Abul Fazl		
2019	Yeh Teri Galiyan	Vikram Shekhawat		
2021	Humkadam			
2021	Mauka-E-Vardaat	Sr. Inspector Piyush Rathore		
2022	Bade Achhe Lagte Hain 2	Krish Dixit		
2024	Nath – Rishton Ki Agnipariksha	Arya Pratapsingh		
2025	Jhanak	Siddharth "Sid" Chatterjee		

=== Music videos ===
Year	Title	Singer(s)	Ref.
2019	Saanwal	Reewa Rathod	
