= Indian Telly Award for Best Actor in a Negative Role =

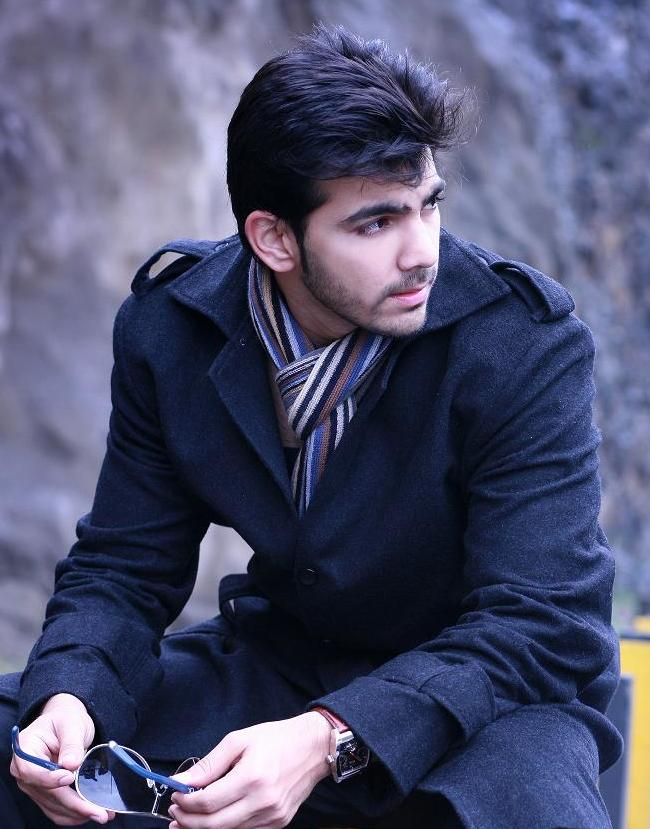
- The 2023 recipient: Karan Grover
- Awarded for: Best performance by a male actor in a negative role on television
- Country: India
- Presented by: IndianTelevision.com
- First award: 2002 (for performances in TV shows in 2001)
- Currently held by: Karan Grover for Udaariyaan (Popular)
- Website: Indian Telly Awards

Indian Telly Award for Best Actor in a Negative Role is an award given by Indiantelevision.com as part of its annual Indian Telly Awards for TV serials, to recognize a male actor who has delivered an outstanding performance in a negative role.

The award was first awarded in 2002. Since 2010, the award has been separated in two categories, Jury Award and Popular Award. Jury award is given by the chosen jury of critics assigned to the function while Popular Award is given on the basis of public voting.

== Superlatives ==
Superlative	Popular		Overall (Popular + Jury)	
Actor with most awards	Mohnish Bahl	2	Mohnish Bahl; Anupam Shyam	2
Actor with most nominations	Chetan Hansraj	4	Chetan Hansraj; Anupam Shyam	4
Actor with most nominations (without ever winning)	Chetan Hansraj	4	Chetan Hansraj	4

== List of winners (Popular) ==
=== 2000s ===
- 2001 Not Awarded
- 2002 Govind Namdev - Sarhadein as Kedarnath
  - Rajeev Mehta – Ek Mahal Ho Sapno Ka as Sameer Nanavati
  - Aasif Sheikh – Mehndi Tere Naam Ki as Raj
  - Prashant Narayanan – Shagun as Sumer
  - Rajendranath Zutshi – Bazaar as Subrat
- 2003 Mohnish Bahl - Devi as Vikram (tied with) Manoj Joshi - Kehta Hai Dil as Mayor Sahab
  - Hiten Tejwani – Kyunki Saas Bhi Kabhi Bahu Thi as Karan
  - Pracheen Chauhan – Kasautii Zindagii Kay as Subroto Basu
  - Rajeev Paul – Kahaani Ghar Ghar Kii as Deven Garg
  - Murli Sharma – Virasaat
- 2004 Shabbir Ahluwalia - Kahiin To Hoga as Rishi
  - Manoj Joshi – Kehta Hai Dil as Mayor Sahab
  - Akashdeep Saigal – Kyunki Saas Bhi Kabhi Bahu Thi as Ansh Gujral
  - Mohnish Bahl – Devi as Vikram
  - Rituraj Singh – Kahaani Ghar Ghar Kii as Sanjay Doshi
  - Vinay Jain – Jassi Jaissi Koi Nahin as Aryan
- 2005 Akashdeep Saigal - Kyunki Saas Bhi Kabhi Bahu Thi as Ansh Gujral
  - Shabbir Ahluwalia – Kahiin To Hoga as Rishi
  - Rahil Azam – Yeh Meri Life Hai as Ashmit
  - Alyy Khan – Guns & Roses
  - Chetan Hansraj – Kahaani Ghar Ghar Kii as Saasha
- 2006 Mohnish Bahl - Ek Ladki Anjaani Si as Veer
  - Aman Verma – Viraasat as Rishabh Lamba
  - Vikas Sethi – Kahiin To Hoga as Swayam
  - Puneet Sachdev – Bhabhi as Vishwa
  - Karanvir Bohra – Kasautii Zindagii Kay as Prem
- 2007 Ronit Roy - Kasamh Se as Aparajit Dev
  - Akashdeep Saigal – Kyunki Saas Bhi Kabhi Bahu Thi as Eklavya
  - Aman Verma – Viraasat as Rishabh Lamba
  - Raqesh Bapat – Saat Phere: Saloni Ka Safar as Neel
  - Chetan Hansraj – Dharti Ka Veer Yodha Prithviraj Chauhan as Bhimdev
  - Rajesh Khera – Left Right Left as Major Bhargav
- 2008 Jatin Shah – Kasturi as Ronak
  - Satyajit Sharma – Balika Vadhu as Vasant
  - Chetan Hansraj – Kahaani Ghar Ghar Kii as Saasha
  - Faisal Raza Khan – Parrivaar as Swapnil
  - Indraneil Sengupta – Maayka as Tushar
- 2009 Sudesh Berry - Agle Janam Mohe Bitiya Hi Kijo as Loha Singh
  - Harsh Chhaya – Ladies Special as Karan
  - Vikram Gokhale – Jeevan Saathi as Vikramaditya Rathod
  - Mahesh Manjrekar – Monica Mogre Case Files as Deep Raj Mathur
  - Aditya Redij – Na Aana Is Des Laado as Raghav

=== 2010s ===
- 2010 Anupam Shyam - Mann Kee Awaaz Pratigya as Thakur Sajjan Singh
  - Sudesh Berry – Mata Ki Chowki as Sheel Kumar
  - Sachal Tyagi – Agle Janam Mohe Bitiya Hi Kijo as Ranvijay
  - Indresh Malik – 12/24 Karol Bagh as Rajeev Bhalla
  - Rajendra Gupta – Balika Vadhu as Mahavir Singh
  - Yashpal Sharma – Mera Naam Karegi Roshan as Kunwar Kuldeep Singh
- 2011 No Award
- 2012 Karanvir Bohra - Dil Se Di Dua... Saubhagyavati Bhava? as Viraj Dobriyal
  - Vikramjeet Virk – Shobha Somnath Ki as Gajnavi
  - Aman Verma – Na Aana Is Des Laado as Bhanu Pratap
  - Abhaas Mehta – Iss Pyaar Ko Kya Naam Doon? as Shyam Jha
  - Anupam Shyam – Mann Kee Awaaz Pratigya as Thakur Sajjan Singh
- 2013 Mahesh Shetty - Bade Achhe Lagte Hain as Siddhanth Amarnath Kapoor (Sid)
  - Kiran Karmarkar – Uttran as Tej Singh Baldev Singh Bundela
  - Abhaas Mehta – Iss Pyaar Ko Kya Naam Doon? as Shyam Jha
  - Varun Badola – Phir Subah Hogi as Thakur Vikram Singh
  - Krip Suri – Savitri as Rahu Kaal
  - Rajendranath Zutshi – Madhubala - Ek Ishq Ek Junoon as Balraj Choudhary
- 2014 Praneet Bhat - Mahabharat as Shakuni
  - Arpit Ranka – Mahabharat as Duryodhana
  - Manish Wadhwa – Iss Pyaar Ko Kya Naam Doon? Ek Baar Phir as Niranjan Agnihotri
  - Vishwajeet Pradhan – Ek Boond Ishq as Rudra Pratap Singh
  - Mohit Malik – Doli Armaano Ki as Samrat Singh Rathore
- 2015 Sai Ballal – Udaan as Kamal Narayan
  - Avinesh Rekhi – Bharat Ka Veer Putra Maharana Pratap as Akbar
  - Aarya Babbar – Sankatmochan Mahabali Hanuman as Raavan
  - Daya Shankar Pandey – Badi Devrani as Bilasi
  - Harsh Chhaya – Ajeeb Dastaan Hai Ye as Samrat
- 2016
  Not Awarded
- 2017
  Not Awarded
- 2018
  Not Awarded
- 2019 Rajesh Khattar - Bepannah as Harshvardhan Hooda
  - Sanjay Gagnani – Kundali Bhagya as Prithvi Malhotra
  - Abhinav Shukla – Silsila Badalte Rishton Ka as Rajdeep Thakur
  - Rajat Tokas – Naagin 3 as Vikrant
  - Rushiraj Pawar – RadhaKrishn as Ayan
  - Saurabh Raj Jain – Chandragupta Maurya (2018) as Mahapadma Nanda
  - Rahil Azam – Tu Aashiqui as Jayant Dhanrajgir
  - Sanjay Swaraj – Kasautii Zindagii Kay (2018) as Naveen Babu
  - Nikitin Dheer – Naagin 3 as Hukum
  - Ankit Mohan – Naagin 3 as Yuvraj Sehgal

=== 2020s ===
- 2023 Karan Grover - Udaariyaan as Angad Maan

== Jury Award ==
=== 2010s ===
- 2010 Yashpal Sharma - Mera Naam Karegi Roshan as Kunwar Kuldeep Singh
- 2011 No Award
- 2012 Anupam Shyam - Mann Kee Awaaz Pratigya as Thakur Sajjan Singh
  - Sushant Singh – Zindgi Ka Har Rang ... Gulaal as Dushyant
  - Vishwajeet Pradhan – Maryada: Lekin Kab Tak? as Brahmanand Jhaakar
  - Sumit Arora – Pavitra Rishta as Dharmesh Jaipurwala
  - Sooraj Thapar – Chandragupt Maurya as Dhanananda
- 2013 Kiran Karmarkar - Uttran as Tej Singh Baldev Singh Bundela
  - Anupam Shyam – Mann Kee Awaaz Pratigya as Sajjan Singh
  - Varun Badola – Phir Subah Hogi as Vikram Singh
  - Mithil Jain – Junoon - Aisi Nafrat Toh Kaisa Ishq as Lakhan Singh
  - Mahesh Shetty – Bade Achhe Lagte Hain as Siddhanth Amarnath Kapoor (Sid)
- 2014 Kishor Kadam - 24 (Indian TV series) as Ravinder
  - Ajinkya Deo – 24 (Indian TV series) as Kartik Chandrashekhar
  - Rahul Singh – 24 (Indian TV series) as Vikrant Maurya
  - Pradip Kabra – Bharat Ka Veer Putra – Maharana Pratap as Shams Khan
  - Vishwajeet Pradhan – Ek Boond Ishq as Rudra Pratap Singh / Kalavati
- 2019 Mukul Dev – 21 Sarfarosh - Saragarhi 1897 as Gul Badshah
