= Pooja Gor =

Indian actress (born 1991)

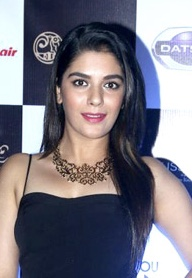
- Gor in 2016
- Born: 1 June 1991 (age 35); Ahmedabad, Gujarat, India
- Other name: Pooja Gaur
- Occupations: Actress, television presenter
- Years active: 2009–present
- Known for: Mann Kee Awaaz Pratigya
- Height: 5 ft 6 in (1.68 m)
- Partner: Raj Singh Arora (2009–2020)
- Parents: Avinash Gor (father); Aarati Gor (mother)
- Relatives: Naman Gor (brother)

Pooja Gor (born 1 June 1991) is an Indian television actress. She is best known for her role of Pratigya in Mann Kee Awaaz Pratigya. In 2014, she participated in the reality show Fear Factor: Khatron Ke Khiladi 5.

== Early life ==
Pooja Gor was born on 1 June 1991 in Ahmedabad, Gujarat. In 2015, Gor learned kickboxing for self defence and to stay physically fit.

== Career ==
=== Television ===
Gor began her television career in 2009 with a supporting role in Imagine TV's romance Kitani Mohabbat Hai alongside Karan Kundra and Kritika Kamra. She played the role of Purvi, the sister-in-law of the female lead Aarohi (played by Kamra). The show, which premiered in January 2009, culminated in September that year.

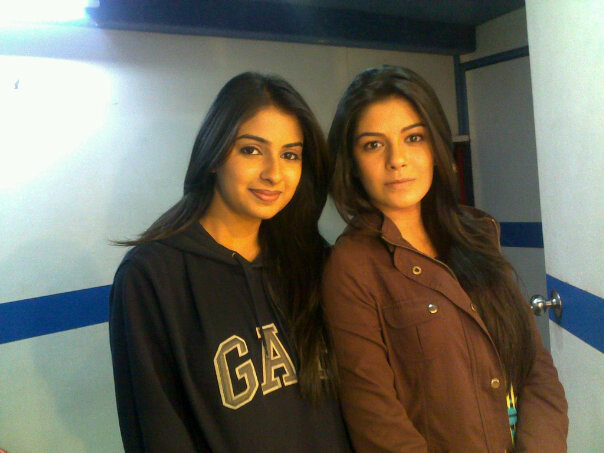
Pooja Gor with actress Avantika Hundal.

Later that year, Gor was cast opposite Arhaan Behll in the Star Plus soap Mann Kee Awaaz Pratigya, where she played Pratigya. The show went off air in 2012 after a good run of 3 years.

In 2013, Gor appeared in two episodes of Life OK's episodic horror series Ek Thhi Naayka opposite Vishal Gandhi. In the same year, she played an episodic role in another episodic romantic series Yeh Hai Aashiqui alongside Sehban Azim. She also made a special appearance in the finale of the reality show Bigg Boss 6.

From 2013 to 2015, Gor hosted Life OK's crime drama Savdhaan India. In 2014, she participated in Colors TV's reality-stunt series Fear Factor: Khatron Ke Khiladi 5 where she became the first contestant to be eliminated or evicted. That year, she also appeared in Box Cricket League. In 2015, she starred opposite Sahil Anand as Roshni, a doctor, in Life OK's medical series Ek Nayi Ummeed - Roshni.

In 2016, she played an episodic role in Pyar Tune Kya Kiya. In 2019, Gor participated in Colors TV's Kitchen Champion 5 along with Abigail Jain. In 2021, Gor reprise her role Pratigya in Mann Kee Awaaz Pratigya 2 along with Arhaan Behll.

=== Film ===
In 2018, Gor made her film debut with the Abhishek Kapoor-directed inter-faith romance Kedarnath, co-starring Sushant Singh Rajput and newcomer Sara Ali Khan. She portrayed Brinda Mishra in the film.

== Personal life ==
Gor was in a relationship with TV actor Raj Singh Arora starting from 2009. In December 2020, Gor announced their separation on Instagram.

== Filmography ==
=== Films ===
Year	Title	Role	Notes	Ref.
2018	Kedarnath	Brinda Mishra		
2019	NewBorn Mother	Jenny	Short film	

=== Television ===
Year	Title	Role	Notes	Ref.
2009	Kitani Mohabbat Hai	Purvi Sharma Mittal		
2009	Koi Aane Ko Hai	Pooja		
2009–2012	Mann Kee Awaaz Pratigya	Pratigya Saxena Singh Thakur		
2010	Meethi Choori No 1	Contestant		
2012	Lakhon Mein Ek	Host		
2013	Ek Thhi Naayka	Anya		
2013	Yeh Hai Aashiqui	Pakhi	Episode: "Pati, Patni Aur No"	
2013–2015	Savdhaan India	Host		
2014	Fear Factor: Khatron Ke Khiladi 5	Contestant	17th place	
2014–2015	Box Cricket League 1	Contestant		
2015	Ek Nayi Ummeed Roshni	Dr. Roshni Singh		
2016	Pyaar Tune Kya Kiya	Sumona		
2021	Mann Kee Awaaz Pratigya 2	Pratigya Saxena Singh Thakur		
2023	Laal Banarasi	Pooja Gaur		

==== Special appearances ====
Year	Title	Role	Ref.
2009	Kis Desh Mein Hai Meraa Dil	Pratigya Saxena Singh Thakur	
2009	Tujh Sang Preet Lagai Sajna	Pratigya Saxena Singh Thakur	
2010	Saath Nibhaana Saathiya	Pratigya Saxena Singh Thakur	
2010	Sapna Babul Ka... Bidaai	Pratigya Saxena Singh Thakur	
2010	Yeh Rishta Kya Kehlata Hai	Pratigya Saxena Singh Thakur	
2010	Kaun Banega Crorepati 4	Herself	
2011	Maayke Se Bandhi Dor	Pratigya Saxena Singh Thakur	
2011	Iss Pyaar Ko Kya Naam Doon?	Pratigya Saxena Singh Thakur	
2011	Ruk Jaana Nahin	Pratigya Saxena Singh Thakur	
2012	Diya Aur Baati Hum	Pratigya Saxena Singh Thakur	
2012	Sasural Genda Phool	Pratigya Saxena Singh Thakur	
2012	Ek Hazaaron Mein Meri Behna Hai	Pratigya Saxena Singh Thakur	
2012	Teri Meri Love Stories	Pratigya Saxena Singh Thakur	
2012	V The Serial	Herself	
2013	Bigg Boss 6	Herself	
2013	Mujhe Pankh De Do	Herself	
2013	The Bachelorette India	Herself	
2015	Zindagi Khatti Meethi	Herself	
2015	Kalash - Ek Vishwaas	Dr. Roshni Singh	
2016	The Kapil Sharma Show	Guest role	
2017	BIG Memsaab	Herself	
2017	Jhalak Dikhhla Jaa 9	Herself	
2018	Sasural Simar Ka	Herself	
2019	Kitchen Champion 5	Herself	
2021	Ankahee Dastaan	Pratigya Saxena Singh Thakur	

=== Web series ===
Year	Title	Role	Notes	Ref.
2016–present	Grass Is Greener On The Other Side	Meera	2 seasons	
2019	The Verdict – State vs Nanavati	Vidya Munshi		
2020	Shrikant Bashir	Raveena Sahni		
2023	Guns & Gulaabs	Madhu Varma		
2024	IC 814: The Kandahar Hijack	Simar Dev		
2026	Kaptaan	Sonia		
2026	Looteri Dulhan	Sandhya Jaiswal		
