= Indian Telly Award for Best Actor in a Supporting Role =

- Awarded for: Best performance by a male actor in a Supporting Role on television
- Country: India
- Presented by: IndianTelevision.com
- First award: 2004 (for performances in TV shows in 2003)
- Currently held by: 2025 Arav Chowdharry - Shrimad Ramayan as Dasharatha
- Website: Indian Telly Awards

Indian Telly Award for Best Actor in a Supporting Role is an award given by Indiantelevision.com as part of its annual Indian Telly Awards for TV serials, to recognize a male actor who has delivered an outstanding performance in a Supporting Role.

The award was first awarded in 2004. Since 2010, the award has been separated in two categories, Jury Award and Popular Award. Jury award is given by the chosen jury of critics assigned to the function while Popular Award is given on the basis of public voting.

As of 2014, the original award is renamed to the Indian Telly Award for Best Actor in a Supporting Role (Drama) and an additional award for Best Actor in a Supporting Role (Comedy) has been introduced.

== Superlatives ==
Superlative	Popular		Overall (Popular + Jury)	
Actor with most awards	Hiten Tejwani	3	Hiten Tejwani; Anoop Soni	3
Actor with most nominations	Anoop Soni	4	Anoop Soni	6
Actor with most nominations (without ever winning)	Alok Nath; Gaurav Chopra	3	Alok Nath	5

== Popular ==
=== 2000-2009 ===
- 2001 Not Awarded
- 2002 Not Awarded
- 2003 Not Awarded
- 2004 Ronit Roy - Kasautii Zindagii Kay as Rishabh Bajaj
  - Harsh Chhaya - Astitva...Ek Prem Kahani as Dr Manas
  - Arun Bali - Des Mein Niklla Hoga Chand as Bauji
  - Parmeet Sethi - Jassi Jaissi Koi Nahin as Raj
  - Deepak Qazir - Kahaani Ghar Ghar Kii as Babuji
  - Mohnish Behl - Sanjivani - A Medical Boon as Dr. Shashank
- 2005 Hiten Tejwani - Kyunki Saas Bhi Kabhi Bahu Thi as Karan Virani
  - Aditya Srivastava - C.I.D. as Abhijit
  - Vinay Jain - Remix as Sumeet
  - Virendra Saxena - Jassi Jaissi Koi Nahin as Balwant Walia
  - Chaitanya Choudhury - Kahiin To Hoga as Akshat
  - Alok Nath - Woh Rehne Waali Mehlon Ki as Yashvardhan Mittal
- 2006 Hiten Tejwani - Kyunki Saas Bhi Kabhi Bahu Thi as Karan Virani
  - Aditya Srivastava - C.I.D. as Abhijit
  - Shabbir Ahluwalia - Kahiin To Hoga as Rishi
  - Mohammad Iqbal Khan - Kavyanjali as Shouriya
  - Deven Bhojani - Baa Bahoo Aur Baby as Gopal "Gattu" Thakkar
- 2007 Hiten Tejwani - Kyunki Saas Bhi Kabhi Bahu Thi as Karan Virani
  - Akshay Anand - Saat Phere...Saloni Ka Safar as Brijesh Pratap Singh
  - Jamnadas Majethia - Baa Bahoo Aur Baby as Dr. Harshad Thakkar
  - Ali Asgar - Kahaani Ghar Ghar Kii as Kamal Agarwal
  - Yatin Karyekar - Ghar Ki Lakshmi Betiyaan as Suryakant
  - Arjun Bijlani - Left Right Left as Cadet Aalekh Sharma
- 2008 Jay Bhanushali - Kayamath as Neev
  - Yatin Karyekar - Ghar Ki Lakshmi Betiyaan as Suryakant
  - Anoop Soni - Balika Vadhu as Bhairav
  - Alok Nath - Sapna Babul Ka...Bidaai as Prakashchand
  - Vikram Gokhale - Jeevan Saathi as Vikram Rathod
- 2009 Anoop Soni - Balika Vadhu as Bhairav
  - Alok Nath - Sapna Babul Ka...Bidaai as Prakashchand
  - Ayub Khan - Uttaran as Jogi Thakur
  - Aditya Lakhia - Agle Janam Mohe Bitiya Hi Kijo as Nanku
  - Vikrant Massey - Balika Vadhu as Shyam

=== 2010-2019 ===
- 2010 Ayub Khan - Uttaran as Jogi Thakur
  - Anoop Soni - Balika Vadhu as Bhairav
  - Vikram Gokhale - Mera Naam Karegi Roshan as Thakur Veer Pratap Singh
  - Vinay Rohrra - Laagi Tujhse Lagan as Bajirao
  - Amit Pachori - Jhansi Ki Rani as Tatya Tope
- 2011 - No Event Held
- 2012 Anoop Soni - Balika Vadhu as Bhairav
  - Jai Kalra - Bade Achhe Lagte Hain as Vikram Shergill
  - Gaurav Chopra - Uttran as Raghuvendra Prathap Rathore
  - Vivek Mushran - Parvarrish – Kuchh Khattee Kuchh Meethi as Lucky Singh Ahluwalia
- 2013 Rithvik Dhanjani - Pavitra Rishta as Arjun Digvijay Kirloskar
  - Jai Kalra - Bade Achhe Lagte Hain as Vikram Shergill
  - Gaurav Chopra - Uttran as Raghuvendra Prathap Rathore
  - Mukesh Khanna - Pyaar Ka Dard Hai Meetha Meetha Pyaara Pyaara as Purushottam Deewan
  - Chetan Pandit - Punar Vivah as Suraj Pratap Sindhia
- 2014 Aham Sharma - Mahabharat as Karna
  - Sameer Dharmadhikari - Buddha as Sudhodhana
  - Gaurav Chopra - Uttran as Raghuvendra Prathap Rathore
  - Arav Chowdhary - Mahabharat as Bhishma
  - Rohit Bhardwaj - Mahabharat as Yudhishtra
- 2016–2018 - No Event Held
- 2019 Kunal Jaisingh - Ishqbaaaz as Omkar Singh Oberoi
  - Shehzad Shaikh as Arjun Hooda for Bepannah
  - Manit Joura as Risabh Luthra for Kundali Bhagya
  - Vin Rana as Purab Khanna for Kumkum Bhagya
  - Bijay Anand as Vijaypath Noon for Dil Hi Toh Hai

=== 2020 - present ===
- 2023 Ajay Nagrath - Bade Achhe Lagte Hain 2 as Aditya Shekhawat
  - Kanwar Dhillon - Pandya Store as Shiva Pandya
  - Aashish Mehrotra - Anupamaa as Paritosh Shah
  - Abhishek Kapur - Kundali Bhagya as Sameer Luthra
  - Aman Gandhi - Bhagya Lakshmi as Ayushmaan Chopra
  - Abhinav Kapoor - Bade Achhe Lagte Hain 2 as Vikrant Arora
  - Kushagra Nautiyal - Kumkum Bhagya as Siddharth Kohli
  - Ashish Dixit - Parineetii as Vikram Kakkar
  - Yogendra Vikram Singh - Ghum Hai Kisikey Pyaar Meiin as Samrat Salunkhe
- 2025 Arav Chowdharry - Shrimad Ramayan as Dasharatha

== Jury ==
=== 2010s ===
- 2010 Sanjeev Seth - Yeh Rishta Kya Kehlata Hai as Vishambhar Nath
- 2011 No Award
- 2012 Nissar Khan - Na Aana Is Des Laado as Joginder Sangwan
  - Darshan Jariwala - Saas Bina Sasural as Chedilal Chaturvedi
  - Anand Goradia - Na Aana Is Des Laado as Gajender Sangwan
  - Pawan Malhotra - Ek Nayi Chhoti Si Zindagi as Shyam
  - Jai Kalra - Bade Achhe Lagte Hain as Vikram Shergill
  - Anoop Soni - Balika Vadhu as Bhairav
- 2013 Aamir Dalvi - Hum Ne Li Hai- Shapath as Kavi
  - Ayub Khan - Uttaran as Jogi Thakur
  - Vikrant Massey - Gumrah - Season 1 as Shobit
  - Alok Nath - Kuch Toh Log Kahenge as Dr. Mathur
  - Late Dwaraka Prasad - Upanishad Ganga as Sevak
- 2014 Shakti Anand - Bharat Ka Veer Putra – Maharana Pratap as Maharana Udai Singh
  - Kapil Nirmal - Ek Veer Ki Ardaas...Veera as Nihal Singh
  - Alok Nath - Do Dil Bandhe Ek Dori Se as Balwant Rana
  - Neil Bhoopalam - 24 (Indian TV series) as Aditya Singhania
  - Sudhir Panday - Balika Vadhu as Premkishor Shekhar
- 2019 Varun Badola - Internet Wala Love as Shubhankar Verma

=== 2023 ===
- 2023 Rajesh Shringarpure - Punyashlok Ahilyabai as Malhar Rao Holkar

== Indian Telly Award for Best Actor in a Supporting Role (Comedy) ==
=== Popular ===
- 2014 Ali Asgar - Comedy Nights with Kapil as Dadi
  - Sunil Grover - Comedy Nights with Kapil as Gutthi
  - Kiku Sharda - Comedy Nights with Kapil as Palak
  - Gautam Gulati - Diya Aur Baati Hum as Vikram Rathi
  - Naveen Bawa - F.I.R. as Villain
- 2015 Kiku Sharda - Akbar Birbal as Akbar
  - Satish Kaushik - Sumit Sambhal Lega as Jasbir Walia
  - Paresh Ganatra - Chidiya Ghar as Ghotak
  - Sunil Grover - Comedy Nights with Kapil as Gutthi
  - Krushna Abhishek - Comedy Nights Bachao

=== Jury ===
- 2014 Shridhar Watsar - Baal Veer as Dooba Dooba 1/Tauba Tauba
  - Gautam Gulati - Diya Aur Baati Hum as Vikram Rathi
  - Saraansh Verma - Chidiya Ghar as Kapi Kesari Narayan
  - Sunil Kumar - Lapataganj - Ek Baar Phir as Suttilal Halwai
  - Naveen Bawa - F.I.R. as Villain
