= Gold Award for Best Actor in a Supporting Role =

Indian film award

- Awarded for: Best Performance by a Male Actor in a Supporting Role on Television
- Country: India
- Presented by: White Leaf Entertainment
- First award: 2007 (for performances in TV shows in 2006)
- Currently held by: Ritvik Arora for Yeh Rishtey Hain Pyaar Ke (Popular); Karan Khanna for Divya Drishti (Jury)
- Website: Gold Awards

Gold Award for Best Actor in a Supporting Role is an award given by Zee TV as part of its annual Gold Awards for Indian television series and artists, to recognize a male actor who has delivered an outstanding performance in a supporting role.

The award was first awarded in 2007, and since has been separated in two categories, Critics Award and Popular Award. Critics Award is given by the chosen jury of critics assigned to the function while Popular Award is given on the basis of public voting.

== Superlatives ==
| Superlative | Popular | | Overall (Popular + Jury) | |
|---|---|---|---|---|
| Actor with most awards | Raj Singh Arora | 3 | Raj Singh Arora | 3 |
| Actor with most nominations | Anoop Soni | 4 | Anoop Soni | 6 |
| Actor with most nominations (without ever winning) | Gaurav Chopra | 3 | Gaurav Chopra | 3 |

== List of winners ==
=== 2000s ===
- 2007 Rajesh Khera - Left Right Left as Cadet Sahni
  - Hiten Tejwani - Kyunki Saas Bhi Kabhi Bahu Thi as Karan Virani
  - Akshay Anand - Saat Phere...Saloni Ka Safar as Brijesh Pratap Singh
  - Jamnadas Majethia - Baa Bahoo Aur Baby as Dr. Harshad Thakkar
  - Ali Asgar - Kahaani Ghar Ghar Kii as Kamal Agarwal
  - Arjun Bijlani - Left Right Left as Cadet Aalekh Sharma
- 2008 Alok Nath - Sapna Babul Ka...Bidaai as Prakashchand
  - Yatin Karyekar - Ghar Ki Lakshmi Betiyaan as Suryakant
  - Anoop Soni - Balika Vadhu as Bhairav
  - Jay Bhanushali - Kayamath as Neev Shergill
  - Vikram Gokhale - Jeevan Saathi as Vikram Rathod
- 2009 Not Held

=== 2010s ===
- 2010 Ayub Khan - Uttaran as Jogi Thakur
  - Anoop Soni - Balika Vadhu as Bhairav
  - Vikram Gokhale - Mera Naam Karegi Roshan as Thakur Veer Pratap Singh
  - Vinay Rohrra - Laagi Tujhse Lagan as Bajirao
  - Amit Pachori - Jhansi Ki Rani as Tatya Tope
- 2011 Ayub Khan - Uttaran as Jogi Thakur
  - Anoop Soni - Balika Vadhu as Bhairav
  - Gireesh Sahedev - Navya..Naye Dhadkan Naye Sawaal as Girish Sachdev
  - Shiv Kumar Subramaniam - Mukti Bandhan as I.M.Virani
- 2012 Anoop Soni - Balika Vadhu as Bhairav
  - Jai Kalra - Bade Achhe Lagte Hain as Vikram Shergill
  - Gaurav Chopra - Uttaran as Raghuvendra Prathap Rathore
  - Vivek Mushran - Parvarrish – Kuchh Khattee Kuchh Meethi as Lucky Singh Ahluwalia
- 2013 Vaquar Shaikh - Qubool Hai as Rashid Khan
  - Rithvik Dhanjani - Pavitra Rishta as Arjun Digvijay Kirloskar
  - Jai Kalra - Bade Achhe Lagte Hain as Vikram Shergill
  - Gaurav Chopra - Uttaran as Raghuvendra Prathap Rathore
  - Mukesh Khanna - Pyaar Ka Dard Hai Meetha Meetha Pyaara Pyaara as Purushottam Deewan
  - Chetan Pandit - Punar Vivaah as Suraj Pratap Sindhia
- 2014 Vishal Singh - Saath Nibhaana Saathiya as Jigar Modi
  - Aham Sharma - Mahabharat as Karna
  - Sameer Dharmadhikari - Buddha as Sudhodhana
  - Gaurav Chopra - Uttaran as Raghuvendra Prathap Rathore
  - Arav Chowdhary - Mahabharat as Bhishma
  - Rohit Bhardwaj - Mahabharat as Yudhishtra
- 2015 Raj Singh Arora - Ye Hai Mohabbatein as Mihir Arora (tied with) Vishal Singh - Saath Nibhaana Saathiya as Jigar Modi
- 2016 Raj Singh Arora - Ye Hai Mohabbatein as Mihir Arora (tied with) Arjit Taneja - Kumkum Bhagya as Purab Mehra
  - Varun Badola - Mere Angne Mein as Raghav Srivastava
- 2017 Vishal Singh - Yeh Rishta Kya Kehlata Hai as Naitik Singhania
  - Vin Rana - Kumkum Bhagya as Purab Khanna
  - Kunal Jaisingh - Ishqbaaaz as Omkara Singh Oberoi
  - Raj Singh Arora - Ye Hai Mohabbatein as Mihir Arora
- 2018 Manit Joura - Kundali Bhagya as Rishabh Luthra (tied with) Kunal Jaisingh - Ishqbaaaz as Omkara Singh Oberoi
  - Vin Rana - Kumkum Bhagya as Purab Khanna
  - Mohit Malik - Kullfi Kumarr Bajewala as Sikander Gill
  - Vishal Singh - Yeh Rishta Kya Kehlata Hai as Naitik Singhania
  - Sudesh Berry -Shakti - Astitva Ke Ehsaas Ki as Harak Singh
- 2019 Ritvik Arora - Yeh Rishtey Hain Pyaar Ke as Kunal Rajvansh
  - Manit Joura - Kundali Bhagya as Rishabh Luthra
  - Vin Rana - Kumkum Bhagya as Purab Khanna
  - Uday Tikekar - Kasautii Zindagii Kay (2018 TV series) as Moloy Basu
  - Karan Khanna - Divya Drishti as Daitya Vanar
  - Rajat Dahiya - Tujhse Hai Raabta as Sarthak Rane
