= Kurush Deboo =

Indian film actor

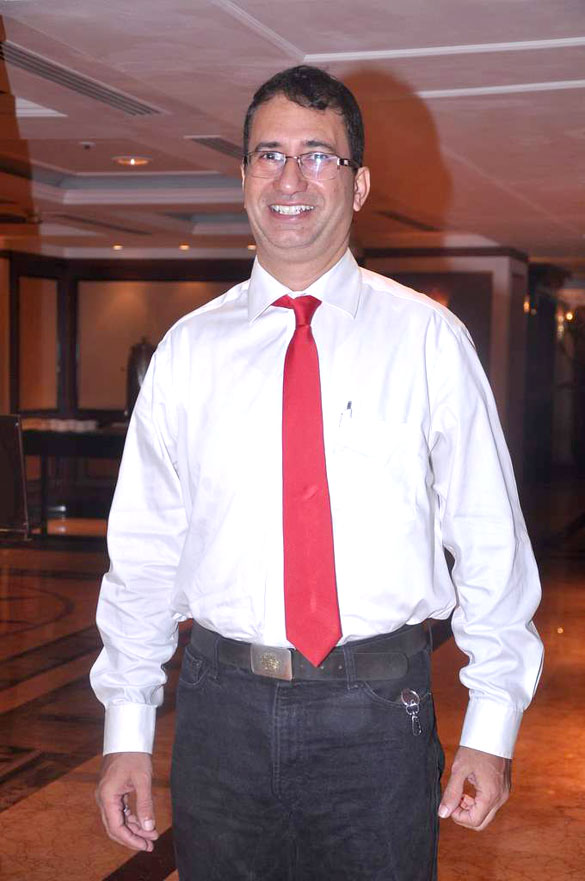
- Kurush Deboo at the audio release of Shirin Farhad Ki Toh Nikal Padi in 2012
- Born: 12 September 1963 (age 62); Mumbai, Maharashtra, India
- Occupation: Actor
- Years active: 1988–present
- Spouse: Benaifer (m. 1999)

Kurush Deboo (born 12 September 1963) is an Indian actor who has acted in many supporting roles in Hindi films and television series. He was first noticed as Shah Rukh Khan's character's loyal friend in Kabhi Haan Kabhi Naa. He is known for his role as Dr. Rustom Pavri in Munnabhai M.B.B.S.

== Early life ==
Kurush Deboo was born on 12 September 1963 in Mumbai in a Parsi family. He grew up in Navsari in Gujarat and completed his BCom in Navsari in 1984. He moved to Mumbai and completed a Diploma in Advertising and Marketing from Xavier's Institute of Communications, Mumbai in 1986 and a Diploma in Marketing Management from Jamnalal Bajaj Institute of Management Studies in 1987.

He received a diploma in acting from Roshan Taneja's Actors Studio in 1988.

== Career ==
Deboo made a debut in the NFDC produced Gujarati film Percy (1989) which earned critical acclaim and a nomination for the Best Actor in National Awards 1990. He acted as Tehmul in Such A Long Journey (1998) and he was nominated for the Best Supporting Actor in Genie Awards 1999.

He has acted in many Hindi films; Kabhi Haan Kabhi Naa (1993), Page 3 (2005), Taxi No. 9211 (2006), Apne (2007), Jhankaar Beats (2003), Kasoor (2001), Bhoothnath Returns (2014), My Friend Ganesha 2 (2008), Lage Raho Munna Bhai (2006). His performance as Dr. Rustom Pavri in superhit film Munna Bhai M.B.B.S. (2003) brought him popularity and critical acclaim. He has also acted in Little Zizou (2008). In 2010s he acted in some Gujarati films including Vitamin She (2016).

He has also acted in many TV Series: Ek Nayi Ummeed - Roshni as Roshni's father Dr. Anand Singh, Jeannie Aur Juju as Doctor Doctor, Adalat, Zindagi Khatti Meethi, Ishq Kills, Maniben.com, Aashiq Biwi Ka, Four, Shaka Laka Boom Boom, Banegi Apni Baat, Bible Ki Kahaniya, Chanakya and Bombay Blue.

== Filmography ==
=== Films ===
Year	Film	Role	Language
1989	Percy	Percy	Gujarati
1993	Aasmaan Se Gira	Royal Philosophy Teacher	Hindi
1993	Sunday	Absent-minded Nutty Passenger	Hindi
1994	Kabhi Haan Kabhi Naa	Yezdi	Hindi
1998	Such a Long Journey	Tehmul (Idiot)	English
2001	Kasoor	Witness, Rustam Sodawaterwalla	Hindi
2001	Urf Professor	Dr. Daruwala	Hindi
2003	Jhankaar Beats	Mr. Deboo	Hindi
2003	Chupke Se	Shop Manager	Hindi
2003	Waisa Bhi Hota Hai Part II	Cyrus	Hindi
2003	Munna Bhai M.B.B.S.	Dr. Rustom Pavri	Hindi
2004	Mujhse Shaadi Karogi	Rustom Dogs Seller	Hindi
2004	Kis Kis Ki Kismat	Khaled Mahmud	Hindi
2005	Chand Sa Roshan Chehra	College Principal	Hindi
2005	Page 3	Hiren Sanghvi	Hindi
2005	Bachke Rehna Re Baba	Dr. Hingoo (Wealthy Doctor)	Hindi
2005	Kyon Ki	Munna (Idiot)	Hindi
2005	Ek Khiladi Ek Haseena	Sunny Dastur	Hindi
2006	Taxi No. 9211	Cyrus Batliwala (Vault Manager)	Hindi
2006	Lage Raho Munna Bhai	Dhansukh Bhai Patel (Gujarati Lawyer)	Hindi
2006	Iqraar by Chance	Detective D'costa	Hindi
2007	Hattrick	Psychiatrist	Hindi
2007	Apne	Dr. Niranjan Sarabhai	Hindi
2007	Dhamaal	Victim of Conmen's Fraud Painting	Hindi
2008	Krazzy 4	Angry male on public telephone	Hindi
2008	Love Story 2050	Jimmy Dhinchuck (hacker)	Hindi
2008	Money Hai Toh Honey Hai	Production Supervisor	Hindi
2008	My Friend Ganesha 2	Bejanjee	Hindi
2008	Little Zizou	Kurush (Chief Disciple of Cyrus II Khodaiji)	English
2009	Sankat City	Bawajee	Hindi
2009	Fox	Zubin	Hindi
2010	Chance Pe Dance	Sameer's Landlord	Hindi
2010	Paathshaala	Cyrus Hansotia (Teacher)	Hindi
2010	Hello Darling	Rustomjee (Retail Shop Owner)	Hindi
2010	Knock Out	Witness, Sandwhichwala	Hindi
2011	Utt Pataang	Ramvilas' Office Colleague	Hindi
2011	Happy Husbands	Champoo Patel	Hindi
2012	Mere Dost Picture Abhi Baki Hai a.k.a. Amar Joshi Shahid Ho Gaya	Producer	Hindi
2012	Shirin Farhad Ki Toh Nikal Padi	Sorab	Hindi
2012	Tukkaa Fitt	Rajat Kapoor	Hindi
2012	Four Two Ka One	Mallu	Hindi
2013	2 Little Indians	Dabba (Comic Duffer Thief)	Hindi
2013	Zindagi 50-50	Director Subhash Kapoor	Hindi
2013	Once Upon ay Time in Mumbai Dobaara!	Stylo Tailor Manager	Hindi
2014	Bhoothnath Returns	Psychiatrist	Hindi
2015	Hey Bro	Rustom Bandookwalla	Hindi
2015	Kuch Kuch Locha Hai	Nauzer Daruwalla	Hindi
2015	Chor Bazaari	Mushtaq	Hindi
2015	Mastizaade	Dr. Daruwalla	Hindi
2015	Tomchi	Mehta	Hindi
2017	Vitamin She	Sudhir / Shree Krishna	Gujarati
2017	Best of Luck Laalu	Parsi Doctor	Gujarati
2017	Daud Pakad		Gujarati
2019	99 Songs		Hindi
2020	Safalta 0 km		Gujarati
2020	Paatra		Gujarati
2021	EkDe Ek		Gujarati
2022	Shu Tame Kunwara Chho?		Gujarati
2023	Non Stop Dhamaal	Dilzaan Daruwala	Hindi

=== Television ===
Year	Show	Character / Role	Notes
1990	Chanakya	Cliturcus a.k.a. Kritorus	Greek Army Officer
1993	Bible Ki Kahaniya	Isaac	Kabir Bedi's (Abraham's) Son
1993–1995	Banegi Apni Baat	E.T.	College Friend of Protagonists Gang
1997	Bombay Blue	Auctioneer	Cameo
2004	Shaka Laka Boom Boom	Colonel K.K. a.k.a. K.K.Uncle	Track Role : 15 Episodes starting from Episode No. 332
2004	Karishma Kaa Karishma	Lappu, the Coward Ghost	1 Episode No. 54 : "Karishma vs. Ghost"
2005	Happy Go Lucky	Teacher Rameshbhai	8 Episodes
2006	Hotel Kingston	Kidnapper	1 Episode No. 29- "Kidnapping of Hotel Owner's Daughter"
2007–2008	Four	Landlord Nariman Bookwalla a.k.a. Parsi Uncle	Throughout Running Role in Series
2007	Agadam Bagdam Tigdam	Sunny's Class Teacher	1 Episode
2009	Bhaskar Bharti	Dr. Vibhushan Nath Chakrapani Baba	1 Episode No.13
2009	Vicky Ki Taxi	Pinto, the Garage Owner	1 Episode: "Jaaneman Meri Taxi"
2009	Ssshhhh...Koi Hai	Cyrus Batliwala	"Ssshhhh Phir Koi Hai" 1 Episode No.174 : "Honeymoon Hotel"
2009	Maniben.com	Dr. Goliwalla	8 Episodes: "Maniben in Hospital"
2009–2010	Aashiq Biwi Ka	Lawyer Tehmul Tata a.k.a. T.T.	Throughout Running Role in Series
2012	Gumrah: End of Innocence	Porous Batliwala	1 Episode
2012	The Suite Life of Karan & Kabir	Teacher	1 Episode
2012–2014	Jeannie Aur Juju	Dr. Cyrus Doctor a.k.a. Doctor Doctor	Throughout Running Role in Series
2014	Ishq Kills	Pastakia, Parsi Neighbour	1 Episode : No.10 : "Meethi Supari"
2014	Adaalat	Marz Furniturewala	2 Episodes No. 320 & 321 : Title: "Victoria Case"
2015	Zindagi Khatti Meethi	Robert D'costa	1 Episode No. 16 : Title: "Marriage Proposal for Rita"
2015–2016	Ek Nayi Ummeed - Roshni	Dr. Anand Singh a.k.a. Roshni's Father	Throughout Running Role in Series

=== Web series ===
Year	Title	Role	Platform	Notes
2018	Akoori	Batliwala	ZEE5	Season 1
2019	Parchhayee	Uncle Ken	ZEE5	
2019	The Verdict - State vs Nanavati	S. R. Vakil	ALTBalaji and ZEE5	
2022	Duranga	Fardoon Bootwala	ZEE5	
