= Jeet Jayenge Hum =

- Genre: Drama
- Starring: See below
- Country of origin: India
- Original language: Hindi
- No. of seasons: 1
- No. of episodes: 76

Production
- Executive producers: Aniruddh Pathak & Sanjay Kohli
- Producer: Benaifer Kohli
- Camera setup: Multi-camera
- Running time: Approx. 52 minutes
- Production company: Edit II Productions

Original release
- Network: Sony Entertainment Television
- Release: 14 December 2009 – 22 April 2010

Jeet Jayenge Hum is an Indian television drama series airs on Sony TV, which premiered on 14 December 2009. The series focuses on the concept of child labor, and is produced by joint venture of Aniruddh Pathak and Sanjay Kohli.

== Cast ==
- Sana Amin Sheikh ... Suman
- Naman Shaw ... Prabhakar
- Pawan Shankar ... Manas Thakur IPS (SP City)
- Ayesha Kaduskar ... Radha
- Stuti Rushi ... Chutki
- Namit Shah ... Shankar
- Anjali Rana ... Prabhakar's Sister
- Akhilendra Mishra ... Yadav
- Kamya Panjabi ... Devyani
- Nawazuddin Siddiqui ... Madhav (Dead)
- Nupur Alankar ... Damyanti (Dead)
- Mehul Kajaria ... Mannu
- Shweta Ghosh ...
