= Divya Chouksey =

Indian actress (1990–2020)

- Born: 14 September 1990; Bhopal, Madhya Pradesh, India
- Died: 12 July 2020 (aged 29); Bhopal, Madhya Pradesh, India
- Education: University of Bedfordshire
- Occupations: Actress; singer; songwriter

Divya Chouksey (14 November 1990 – 12 July 2020) was an Indian Bollywood actress, model, singer and songwriter. She was a part of MTV's Making The Cut 2, MTV True Life, and MTV Bakra. Divya was a participant of the I AM SHE Miss Universe in the year 2011. She made her debut in Bollywood with the 2016 film, Hai Apna Dil Toh Awara.

== Early life and family ==
Divya Chouksey was born in Bhopal, Madhya Pradesh, India. After completing her schooling in Bhopal, she went to Delhi to pursue her graduate studies in Mass Communications. After that, she received her Masters in Documentary Filmmaking from the University of Bedfordshire.

== Career ==
Divya returned to India and went to Mumbai where she worked in MTV's Making The Cut 2, MTV True Life, and MTV Bakra. She participated in I Am She Miss Universe in 2011. She made her debut in Bollywood with Hai Apna Dil Toh Awara. Her debut song was "Patiyaale Di Queen". Foraying into singing was not planned. She learned Punjabi during her four year stay in Delhi and introduced her feminist song on International Women's Day.

== Death ==
On 12 July 2020, Divya Chouksey died after losing her battle with cancer, with which she had struggled for a year and a half. She was 29 years old.
