= Happy Husbands (2011 film) =

- Promotional poster
- Directed by: Anay Sharma
- Written by: Anay Sharma
- Produced by: Suresh Sharma
- Starring: Anay Sharma; Kurush Deboo; Gaurav Ghai; Bakul Thakkar; Farida; Archana; Danica Moadi
- Cinematography: Srikanth Naroj
- Edited by: Vilas Ranade; Deepak Wirkud; Anay
- Music by: Anay Sharma
- Production company: Phenomenal Craft
- Release date: 25 March 2011
- Country: India
- Language: Hindi

Happy Husbands is a Hindi comedy film, directed by Anay Sharma and produced by Suresh Sharma. The film was released under the Phenomenal Craft banner.

== Plot ==
Arjun, Champoo, and Mohit are married to wives who love them; however, they would prefer to meet other women and even date them. For this purpose, Arjun introduces them to a successful executive, Jaiveer, who is married to Priya and has a young son. Through him, they meet and get involved with a variety of women. Their respective wives are not aware of these turns of events; however, things get complicated for Jaiveer himself when his wife gets evidence of his infidelity.

== Cast ==
- Anay Sharma as Jaiveer
- Ahwaan Kumar as Arjun
- Kurush Deboo as Champoo Patel
- Mohit Ghai as Mohit
- Archana Sharma as Priya
- Danica Moadi as Diya, Arjun's wife
- Shruti Sharma as Naina, Mohit's wife
- Akanksha as Jimmy's wife
- Jimmy Cooper as Jimmy
- Sunil Bhalla as Bhalla
- Aray Bhalla as Happy Singh
- Gaurav Ghai as Dave
- Lisa as Dave's girlfriend
- Tonikram Mattoo as Chadda
- Harshaali as Chadda's wife
- Heena Rajput as Heena

== Soundtracks ==
The album features 5 tracks composed by Anay Sharma, with lyrics written by Sarim Momin.

#	Title	Singer(s)
1	"Aai Aai Aai Hai"	Ishq Bector, Earl, Anay Sharma
2	"Love You"	Javed Ali
3	"Tum Se"	Naresh Iyer
4	"Tu Hi Meri"	Hamza Faruqui
5	"Aish Kar Aish Kar"	Sunidhi Chauhan
