= Aashiq Biwi Ka =

Indian television series

- Genre: Comedy
- Written by: Deepakk Sunil Prasadh; Brij Katyal (concept)
- Directed by: Sunil Prasad
- Starring: Rajeev Verma, Upasna Singh, Neelu Kohli, Amita Nangia, Nilima Parandekar, Rohan Jaywant, Pravin Yadav
- Opening theme: "Aashiq Biwi Ka"
- Country of origin: India
- Original language: Hindi
- No. of seasons: 1

Production
- Producer: Prerna Wadhawan
- Camera setup: Multi-camera
- Running time: 30 minutes

Original release
- Network: DD National
- Release: 7 May 2009

Aashiq Biwi Ka is a Hindi language Indian comedy series aired on DD National channel. The series launched on 7 May 2009. The story deals about a woman named Radha who has goodness and sense of humour suddenly passes away due to illness.For her goodness and seeing her plight she is given an opportunity by yamaraj and chitragupt to stay in Pitru Loka to see things in the earth whats happening in her family after her life which makes her more curious anxious and attached to her family.

== Cast ==
- Rajeev Verma
- Upasana Singh as Radha Devi/Ghost Mother
- Amita Nangia
- Neelu Kohli
- Rohan Jaywant
- Praveen Yadav
- Riddhima Tiwari as Neeta
- Kurush Deboo as Lawyer Tehmul Tata aka T.T.
- Neelima Parandekar
- Jaineeraj Rajpurohit
