= Vish Ya Amrit: Sitara =

- Genre: Supernatural
- Created by: Rashmi Sharma
- Written by: Sharad Tripathi; Raghuvir Shekhawat; Aayush Agrawal; Akash Deep
- Directed by: Bhagwan Yadav
- Creative directors: Diana Chesun; Aayush Agrawal
- Starring: See below
- Country of origin: India
- Original language: Hindi
- No. of seasons: 1
- No. of episodes: 134

Production
- Producer: Rashmi Sharma
- Camera setup: Multi-camera
- Running time: 21 minutes
- Production company: Rashmi Sharma Telefilms

Original release
- Network: Colors TV
- Release: 3 December 2018 – 7 June 2019

Vish Ya Amrit: Sitara (transl. Poison or Elixir: Sitara) is an Indian supernatural TV series. It aired from 3 December 2018 to 7 June 2019 on Colors TV, an Indian general entertainment broadcast network owned by Viacom 18. Produced by Rashmi Sharma Telefilms, it stars Adaa Khan.

== Plot ==
Sitara was born to be vishkanya, due to which her father Kuldeep tries to keep her away from evil forces, but fate brings her back to the place where it all started when her father gets reinstated as a protector of the royal family. Sitara gets the job as prince Viraj Singh's bodyguard. Her biological mother Vrinda who was once turned into a stone becomes normal just as Sitara steps inside the palace. She vows to find and bring Sitara back with the help of her sisters Chhabili, Albeli and Surili. Viraj gets engaged to princess Netra who manipulated the royal Guru to believe that she is the perfect girl for the prince who will save him from every attack. is a very rude girl and starts to trouble Sitara when she gets jealous of Sitara's capabilities and closeness to Viraj who falls for Sitara. Chhabili takes Netra's body and leads Sitara to Vrinda. Vrinda poisons Sitara's mind against Ratan Pratap Singh (Shakti Anand) and other members of the royal family and reveals that she is a vishkanya just like her. Sitara plans to kill everyone in the family starting with Viraj but falls in love with him. Later, Sitara finds out her mother lied to her and is heartbroken to know that her mother only used her to do finish her job. Sitara decides to go against her mother and her aunts and protect the royal family. Sitara temporarily defeats her mother who again returns to kill Ratan Pratap. Vrinda wants Surali to marry Viraj and blackmails Netra into leaving the wedding. Viraj refuses to marry Surili and proposes to Sitara who first refuses but later agrees as the family also agrees. Viraj and Sitara get married. During Holi, On Vrinda's orders Chhabili kills the king and the queen (Shital Thakkar) blames Sitara and sends her to jail. Then Sitara returns and vows to avenge the king's death. She kills her aunt Chhabili. Later everyone finds out about Sitara's truth. The queen tells Sitara to kill the vishkanyas but leave immediately after that. After some other twist, Sitara captures her mother and asks her to give up her powers which she agrees to. Before leaving Vrinda creates a lookalike of Sitara and names her Vishtara who looks like Sitara and has equal powers to Sitara. Sitara decides to burn herself in order to kill Vistara. Sitara defeats her aunts and Vishtara and lives happily with Viraj as her venom was removed from her as soon as she killed Vishtara and the two consummate their marriage.

== Cast ==
=== Main ===
- Adaa Khan as Sitara Shekhawat / Singh – Kuldeep and Vrinda's daughter; Viraj’s wife (2018–2019)
  - Vishtara: Sitara's lookalike (2019)
- Arhaan Behll as Viraj Singh – Raja and Rani's son; Sitara’s husband (2018–2019)

=== Recurring ===
- Shilpa Saklani as Vrinda (air Vishkanya) – Albeli, Surbeli and Chhabili's sister; Kuldeep's former wife; Sitara's mother (2018–2019)
- Vaishali Takkar as Netra Singh Rathore – Viraj's former fiance (2018–2019)
- Shakti Anand as Ratanpratap Singh – Viraj's father (2018–2019)
- Soni Singh as Albeli (water vishkanya) – Vrinda, Surili and Chhabili's sister (2018–2019)
- Lavina Tandon as Surili (fire vishkanya) – Vrinda, Albeli and Chhabili's sister (2018–2019)
- Falaq Naaz as Chhabili (soil vishkanya) – Vrinda, Albeli and Surili's sister (2018–2019)
- Vikrant Chaturvedi as Gyanendra (Rajguru) (2018–2019)
- Sandeep Baswana as Kuldeep Shekhawat – Vrinda's former husband; Sitara's father (2018–2019)
- Arina Dey as Jamuna – A Banjaran (2018)
- Ankit Raj as Samrat Singh, Viraj's cousin brother (2018–2019)
- Harshit Arora as Aryan Singh Rathore, Netra’s brother and Samrat’s best friend (2018–2019)
- Ashutosh Priyadarshi as Royal Guard
- Sheetal Thakkar as Lakshmi Ratanpratap Singh, Viraj's mother, Ratanpratap Singh's wife (2018–2019)
- Amrapali Gupta as Kalindi (2019)
- Sayantani Ghosh as Mahamata (2019)
- Amandeep Sidhu as Hariyali (2019)
- Mani Rai as Arjun Singh, Viraj's uncle, Samrat and Padmini's father (2018–2019)
- Reema Vohra as Yamini Arjun Singh, Viraj's Aunt, Samrat and Padmini's mother (2018–2019)
- Zebby Singh as Surya Singh, Ratan's Illegitimate son (2019)
- Afzaal Khan as Atharv Singh Rathore, Netra and Aryan's father (2018–2019)
- Sangeeta Kapure as Kanchi Atharv Singh Rathore, Atharv's wife and Netra and Aryan's mother (2018–2019)
