= Deepakk Sunil Prasadh =

Indian film director and writer (born 1981)

- Born: 21 May 1981 (age 43); Mumbai, Maharashtra
- Occupation(s): Film Director, Screenwriter, Editor, Creative Director
- Years active: 2003–present

Deepakk Sunil Prasadh is an Indian film director and writer.

== Life and career ==
Born in Mumbai, Deepakk Sunil Prasadh was a bright student, He would visit shooting floors since the age of 6, it is here he dreamt of becoming a Director. Training began early for him. He started off as an Assistant Editor on the TV show Sanskriti on Star Plus. After understanding the ropes of editing, Deepakk Sunil Prasadh started assisting Mr. Tony Singh on the show Jassi Jaissi Koi Nahin. After a brief stint of TV he set his sights on Films and joined Mr. Kabir Sadanand as an assistant director on the Pritish Nandy Communications Produced Hindi Movie Popcorn Khao! Mast Ho Jao. Deepakk Sunil Prasadh continued his work with Kabir Sadanand on various TV shows like CID, CID Special Bureau, Akayla, etc.

== Filmography ==
Year	Project	Role	Company	Channel
2021	Tera Chhalaava	Director	Frog Unlimited	Directed "Oh Baby" of the 5 Episode Anthology
2019	Virgin Woman Diaries - Season 2	Director	Frog Unlimited	10 Episode Web-Series
2018	Laal Ishq	Director	Frog Unlimited	1 Hour Episodic Stories for &TV
2016	The Silent Statue	Creative Director	Akriti Entertainment Pvt. Ltd.	Short film Selected at Cannes 2016 short Film Corner
2015	Billy aur Tara	Editor & Associate Director	A Teaser shot for pitching to Corporates	Hindi Film
2014	Ye Shadi Hai Ya Sauda	Creative Director	Akriti Entertainment Pvt. Ltd	DD National
2014	Ghanteshwar Prasad Ghantewale	Creative Director	Akriti Entertainment Pvt. Ltd	DD National
2013	Haunted Nights	2nd Unit Director	The Entertainment Hub	Sahara One
2013	Police Files	Creative Director & 2nd Unit Director	Sa Re Ga Ma & Ocean Multivision	Big Magic
2013	Pyaar Ya Dehshat	Creative Director & 2nd Unit Director	Sa Re Ga Ma & Ocean Multivision	Big Magic
2012	Television Show Pitch	Writer (Dialogues & Broad Story)	Prakash Jha Productions	Upcoming GEC
2011-2013	Bloody Isshq	First Assistant Director	Ashavari Media Pvt. Ltd.	Hindi Feature Film
2010-2011	Aashiq Biwi Ka	Writer	Swarp Films	Doordarshan
2010-2011	Stree Teri Kahaani	2nd Unit Director & Chief Assistant Director	Sharp Focus (Saira Banu & Dilip Kumar)	Doordarshan
2010	Hi! Padosi... Kaun Hai Doshi?	2nd Unit Director & Chief Assistant Director	B. R. Films	Star One
2009-2010	Jab Lahu Pukaarela	Chief Assistant Director	Le Loisir Resorts Pvt. Ltd.	Bhojpuri Film
2009-2010	Krishna Arjun	Chief Assistant Director	Le Loisir Resorts Pvt. Ltd.	Gujrati Film
2010	Hamaari Devrani	Chief Assistant Director	Shobhna Desai Productions	Star Plus
2006-2007	Maatti	Chief Assistant Director	Karma Events & Entertainment	Bhojpuri Film
2005-2006	Akayla	Chief Assistant Director	Fireworks	Sony TV
2005-2006	CID	Chief Assistant Director	Fireworks	Sony TV
2005-2006	CID Special Bureau	Chief Assistant Director	Fireworks	Sony TV
2003-2004	Popcorn Khao! Mast Ho Jao	Assistant Director	PNC	Hindi Film
2003	Jassi Jaissi Koi Nahin	Assistant Director	DJ's A Creative Unit	Sony
