= Sana Amin Sheikh =

Indian actress and a radio jockey

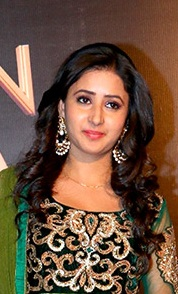
- Sheikh at the Golden Petal Awards in 2016
- Born: Mumbai, Maharashtra, India
- Occupations: Actress; Radio Jockey
- Spouse: Aijaz Sheikh (m. 2016; div. 2022)

Sana Amin Sheikh is an Indian actress and radio jockey, who appears mainly in Hindi television shows and films. Sana made her acting debut with Kya Mast Hai Life playing Ritu Shah. She has appeared in over 30 television serials, and has established herself among the most popular Television stars. Sana has played lead roles in shows including Jeet Jayenge Hum, Gustakh Dil, Million Dollar Girl, Bhootu Season 1, Krishnadasi and Perfect Pati among others. She played Antagonist/Supporting role in shows like Kuch Rang Pyar Ke Aise Bhi 3, Tere Shehar Mein, Mann Kee Awaaz Pratigya. Amin made her Bollywood debut with Singham as Anjali Bhosle and has also played supporting parts in Table No. 21, Island City and Bamfaad.

== Early life ==
Sana is from Mumbai. Her great-grandfather, Ashraf Khan, was an actor and a singer in Gujarati theatre, and played the narrator in filmmaker Mehboob Khan's film Roti.

== Personal life ==
She was married to television director Aijaz Sheikh from 2016 to 2022.

== Career ==
Sheikh is working as an RJ in Radio Mirchi 98.3 FM since August 2004. Whilst listening to Mirchi one day in class, she heard an RJ inviting listeners to audition to be a radio jockey. After a successful audition, she was immediately asked to join the station as an RJ. She hosted a show 'Khoobsurat, Sana ke saath and TRP – Television Radio Par RJ with Mirchi Love and Ishq FM.

Sheikh began acting as a child artist and played the lead role of young Savi in Hasratein on Zee TV and played the character of Vaishali in the serial Junoon on DD channel in 1995. She emerged again in 2009 and gained fame for playing one of the leads Ritu Shah on the Disney Channel India Original Series, Kya Mast Hai Life. She then played lead the role of Suman as the lead actress in the television serial Jeet Jayenge Hum, which was aired on Sony Entertainment Television (India). Another drama series she took part in, once again being the lead actress, was Zee television's Mera Naam Karegi Roshan, as Reet. She has been a part of the famous Star Plus drama Mann Kee Awaaz Pratigya, performing the role of Ganga.She was seen playing a negative role in Colors' Sasural Simar Ka as Naina for a few episodes and then was seen as a lead girl again in life OK's Gustakh Dil. She made her Bollywood debut in Rohit Shetty's Singham. She also worked in Channel V's Million Dollar Girl as the lead character Avanti Bansal. She played lead role of Aradhya in Colors TV's popular show Krishnadasi. She played the lead as Shuchi Sharma in the serial Bhootu.

== Filmography ==
=== Television ===
Year	Title	Role	Notes
1994	Junoon	Vaishali	
1995	Hasratein	Savi	Child actress
2009–2010	Kya Mast Hai Life	Ritu Shah	Parallel Lead
2009–2010	Jeet Jayenge Hum	Suman	Lead Role
2010	Mera Naam Karegi Roshan	Reet	Lead Role
2011	Mann Kee Awaaz Pratigya	Ganga	Supporting Role
2012–2013	Sasural Simar Ka	Naina	Antagonist
2013–2014	Gustakh Dil	Laajwanti "Lajjo" Bhardwaj	Lead Role
2015	Bhanwar	Reshmi Pande	Episodic Lead role
2015	Code Red Talaash	Aarohi Patil	Episodic Lead role
2015	Million Dollar Girl	Avanti Bansal	Lead Role
2015	Pyaar Tune Kya Kiya	Manali	Episodic Role
2015	Tere Shehar Mein	Kangana and Kanika Gupta	Dual Role / Antagonist
2016	Krishnadasi	Aradhya	Lead Role
2016	Comedy Nights Live	Herself	Guest appearance
2016	Comedy Nights Bachao	Herself	Guest appearance
2017, 2018	Naamkaran	Mitali Sharma	Extended Cameo Role
2017–2018	Bhootu Season 1	Shuchi Sharma	Lead Role
2018	Laal Ishq	Manjari	Episodic Lead Role
2018	Kaun Hai?	Yamini	Episodic Lead Role
2019	Perfect Pati	Vidhita Rajawat / Vidhita Pushkar Rathore	Lead Role
2019	Nazar	Bhasmika / Urvashi	Antagonist
2021	Crime Alert	Madhu	Lead Role
2021	Kuch Rang Pyar Ke Aise Bhi 3	Sanjana Arora	Antagonist Negative Role
2024–2025	United State Of Gujarat	Sanskriti "Kay"	Lead Role

=== Web series ===
Year	Title	Role	Notes
2023	Scam 2003	Nafisa Telgi	SonyLIV series

=== Films ===
Year	Title	Role	Notes	Ref(s)
2011	Singham	Anjali Bhosle	Film debut	
2013	Table No. 21	Neeti		
2015	Island City	Vaidehi		
2020	Bamfaad	Walia	ZEE5 film	
2021	Main Mulayam Singh Yadav	Malti Mulayam Singh Yadav		

== See also ==
- List of Indian film actresses
