= Island City (2015 film) =

- Directed by: Ruchika Oberoi
- Written by: Ruchika Oberoi
- Produced by: NFDC
- Starring: Vinay Pathak, Tannishtha Chatterjee, Amruta Subhash, Chandan Roy Sanyal, Uttara Baokar, Ashwin Mushran, Daisy khatri
- Cinematography: Sylvester Fonseca
- Edited by: Hemanti Sarkar
- Music by: Sagar Desai
- Distributed by: Drishyam Films
- Release dates: 2 September 2015 (Venice Film Festival); 2 September 2016
- Running time: 111 minutes
- Country: India
- Language: Hindi

Island City is a 2015 Indian drama film written and directed by Ruchika Oberoi. It was screened in the Venice Days section at the 72nd Venice International Film Festival, where Oberoi won the FEDORA prize for the Best Young Director. It was released in India on 2 September 2016.

== Cast ==
- Vinay Pathak as Suyash Chaturvedi
- Tannishta Chatterjee as Aarti
- Amruta Subhash as Sarita Joshi
- Chandan Roy Sanyal as Jignesh
- Samir Kochhar as Purshottam
- Ashwin Mushran as CEO Ajay Sharma
- Sana Amin Sheikh as Vaidehi
- Uttara Baokar as Ajji
- Daisy khatri

== Critical reception ==
Devarsi Ghosh of India Today called it "a very well-made, confident film that fearlessly eschews Bollywoodisms and just exists in its distinctive rhythm; never for a second, feeling the need to shock and impress the audience". Saibal Chatterjee of NDTV gave it a rating of 4 stars out of 5, calling it "absolutely unmissable", also adding "laced with sly wit and captivating storytelling feints, Island City touches heights that Hindi films do only once in a blue moon".

Calling it a "stellar debut film", Sarit Ray of Hindustan Times gave it four stars. Kunal Guha of Mumbai Mirror rated it 3.5 stars, adding "Island City is a compelling watch".

Renuka Vyavahare of The Times of India, who rated the film with 3.5 stars, said "... this one deserves to be watched for its riveting take on love, longing and loneliness".
