= Anupam Shyam =

Indian actor (1957–2021)

Anupam Shyam Ojha
- Born: Anupam Shyam Ojha; 20 September 1957; Pratapgarh, Uttar Pradesh, India
- Died: 8 August 2021 (aged 63); Mumbai, Maharashtra, India
- Other name: Sajjan Singh Thakur
- Education: Bharatendu Academy of Dramatic Arts
- Occupation: Actor
- Years active: 1993–2021
- Known for: Mann Kee Awaaz Pratigya; Krishna Chali London; Kajraare

Anupam Shyam Ojha (20 September 1957 – 8 August 2021) was an Indian film and television actor, who usually played villainous roles. He appeared as Sajjan Singh Thakur in the STAR Plus TV series Mann Kee Awaaz Pratigya (2009 and 2021). Apart from that, he worked in films like Lajja, Nayak, Dubai Return, Parzania, Hazaaron Khwaishein Aisi (2005), Shakti: The Power, Bandit Queen, in the internationally acclaimed movie Slumdog Millionaire (2008) and acted in numerous international films set in India. He last appeared in Star Bharat' s popular series Mann Kee Awaaz Pratigya 2.

== Personal life ==
Anupam Shyam Ojha was a native of Pratapgarh in Uttar Pradesh, and an alumnus of Bhartendu Academy of Dramatic Arts, Lucknow, where he studied from 1983 to 1985. He also supported Anna Hazare's movement held on 27 December 2011.

== Death ==
He died aged 63 on 8 August 2021, at Life Line Hospital due to kidney failure, at age 63.

== Filmography ==
=== Films ===
- Sardari Begum (1996)
- Dastak (1996)
- Jaya Ganga (1996)
- Tamanna (1997)
- Daava (1997)
- Hazaar Chaurasi Ki Maa (1998)
- Dushman (1998)
- Satya (1998)
- Dil Se.. (1998)
- Such a Long Journey (1998)
- Zakhm (1998)
- Pyaar To Hona Hi Tha (1998)
- Kachche Dhaage (1999)
- Sangharsh (1999)
- Lagaan (2001)
- Love Ke Liye Kuch Bhi Karega (2001)
- Nayak: The Real Hero (2001)
- Shakti: The Power (2002)
- Thakshak' Market (2003)
- Mulit (Short) (2003)
- Paap (2004)
- Hanan (2004)
- Hari Om (2004)
- Hazaaron Khwaishein Aisi (2005)
- Sab Kuch Hai Kuch Bhi Nahin (2005)
- The Rising: Ballad of Mangal Pandey (2005)
- Parzania (2005)
- Jigyaasa (2006)
- The Curse of King Tut's Tomb (2006)
- Golmaal (2006)
- Dhokha (2007)
- Halla Bol (2008)
- Slumdog Millionaire (2008)
- Raaz – The Mystery Continues (2009)
- Well Done Abba (2009)
- Wanted (2009)
- Rakta Charitra I (2010)
- Rakta Charitra II (2010)
- Kajraare (2010)
- Akeli (2014)
- Gandhigiri (Movie) (2015)
- Munna Michael (2017)
- 706 (2019)

=== Television ===
- Doordarshan's Astitva Ek Pehchaan as Inspector Shakti Singh
- Amaravati ki Kathayein ... by Shyam Benegal (1995) Episode No. 4-Bus-Thief arrested by police constable/ Episode No. 8 Diwali-Punaiya/ Episode No. 12- Thief - Vinaiyya
- Amma and Family (1995)... Abdul Hamid
- Doordarshan's Jai Hanuman 1997...Rakshas
- Rishtey (Season 3) (2005)
- Kyunki...Jeena Issi Ka Naam Hai (2008)
- Mann Kee Awaaz Pratigya (2009)... Sajjan Singh Thakur
- Welcome - Baazi Mehmaan-Nawaazi Ki (2013)... Himself
- Hum Ne Li Hai... Shapath (2013)... Bhai Saheb
- Doli Armaano Ki (2014)... Tau ji
- Chidiya Ghar (2016)... Thakur
- Krishna Chali London (2018–19)... Lambodar "Dadda" Shukla
- Mann Kee Awaaz Pratigya 2 (2021)... Sajjan Singh Thakur
