= Mann Kee Awaaz Pratigya 2 =

2021 Indian television series

- Genre: Drama
- Created by: Rajan Shahi
- Developed by: Pearl Grey
- Written by: Shanti Bhushan
- Screenplay by: Pearl Grey
- Story by: Pearl Grey; Lakshmi Jayakumar; Anshula Mathur
- Directed by: Neeraj Pandey
- Creative director: Pearl Grey
- Starring: Pooja Gor; Arhaan Behll
- Theme music composer: Paresh Shah
- Country of origin: India
- Original language: Hindi
- No. of episodes: 118

Production
- Executive producer: Pearl Grey
- Producer: Rajan Shahi
- Cinematography: Sanjay Mishra
- Editor: Sameer Gandhi
- Running time: 22 minutes
- Production company: Director's Kut Productions

Original release
- Network: Star Bharat
- Release: 15 March – 25 August 2021

Related
- Mann Kee Awaaz Pratigya

Mann Kee Awaaz Pratigya 2 is an Indian drama television series that premiered from 15 March 2021 on Star Bharat. It is a sequel to the 2009 series Mann Kee Awaaz Pratigya, which aired on Star Plus. The show is produced by Rajan Shahi under Director's Kut Productions, and stars Pooja Gor and Arhaan Behll. The show was cancelled by July 2021.

== Plot ==
Nine years have passed, and Pratigya is now an established public prosecutor of Allahabad. The Thakur family has now given up all criminal activities and lead a happy and content life. Shakti's sons, Samar and Girish, are fiercely jealous of Garv. They lock him in a car, which loses control and accidentally hits the young son of Balwant Tyagi. Balwant Tyagi is the most powerful ‘Bahubali’ of Haryana. Garv tells Krishna, but both hide it from Pratigya. Profoundly grieved by his son's demise, Balwant seeks revenge from those who killed his son. Balwant hires Pratigya as a prosecutor to fight the legal battle of his son's death. Elsewhere, Krishna hides the truth from the Thakur family and tries to destroy all the evidence which can pose a threat for Garv.

Balwant feels restless when Pratigya fails to collect evidence and spoils her Holi celebration. Sajjan Singh Thakur confronts Balwant and asks him to stay within his limits. On the other hand, Krishna's friend Adarsh Yadav is introduced, who will fall in love with Komal. Krishna spikes Pratigya's drink and makes her utter pivotal information. Later, Krishna makes one of his accomplices take the entire blame on himself, but this plan fails.

Further, Balwant frames Shakti in charge of his son's murder. Soon, Pratigya learns about Garv's accident and tells the family they made a mistake hiding it as it is an accident and not a murder. Krishna believes Pratigya after she swears on Garv that nothing will happen to the latter. Later, Pratigya, Krishna and Garv go to the court and tell them about Garv. The judge then tells Pratigya that it was treated as an accident since he is only seven years old.

Nevertheless, Krishna would be arrested for a short time for tampering with evidence. While he is arrested and bids goodbye to Pratigya and his family, Komal slaps Pratigya and blames her for her husband's arrest. Soon Sajjan is told that Krishna is in hospital. They go to the hospital, and Krishna is saved.

After some days, Krishna is discharged from the hospital, and The Thakur's decide to go to a farmhouse so that Krishna recovers fastly. Sumitra weaves a plan with Komal to throw Pratigya out of Thakur House. She poisons Pratigya's juice. A new girl Meera is introduced. On the other hand, Pratigya's health is constantly deteriorating. During her anniversary, she falls. When she consulted Doctors about it, they informed her that she has blood cancer and will die soon.

On the other hand, Meera starts to have a feeling for Krishna. On the advice of Sumitra, Pratigya starts searching for a good wife for Krishna and a mother for her children. Sumitra discovers Komal's love for Adarsh and makes a plan to separate Komal and Adarsh as well as Krishna and Pratigya. Pratigya informs Adarsh about her blood cancer, and Sumitra locks Pratigya and Adarsh in a room as per her plan. Krishna finds Pratigya in Adarsh's room, and Komal was about to slap Pratigya. Still, he stopped her and said that he believes her more than himself and leaves, whereas Komal threatens Sumitra to reveal to Krishna that Sumitra will poison Pratigya if she did not allow her to marry Adarsh. Meanwhile, Adarsh denies love for Komal to her.

Moreover, Pratigya and Adarsh marry each other, and Pratigya refers to Krishna as an uneducated goon. Krishna promises Pratigya to hate her forever, burns her belongings, and marries Meera to make Pratigya jealous. It is revealed in the reports that Pratigya does not have cancer, and Sumitra is giving her poison. Krishna learns of it, breaks all relationships with Sumitra, and leaves with Pratigya. On the road, they face a dangerous accident. Pratigya is assumed to be dead by everyone.

=== 18 months later ===
Krishna has lost his memory, and he resides with the Thakurs. It is revealed that Sumitra and Sajjan only rescued Krishna from the accident and left Pratigya and that Sumitra and Sajjan made Krishna believe that Meera is his wife. However, Pratigya was rescued by an orphanage, and she was in a coma. However, she learns the truth. She tries various methods to regain Krishna's memory, but in vain. After weeks of effort, Pratigya meets Meera, expecting her to understand. However, she refuses to give back her place to Pratigya and goes away. Appalled, Pratigya comes face-to-face with the Thakurs, shocking them all. They soon reveal how they have wanted to kill her since she sent Krishna to jail. Sumitra and Sajjan reveal that they left her to die on the roads, and they wanted Meera to become the daughter-in-law. Pratigya records them admitting the truth of their plan and told them that she would not expose them but instead, she will counter by regaining Krishna's memory. Due to Sumitra's instigation, Meera begins to dislike Pratigya, believing that Pratigya abandoned Krishna. The Thakurs arranged for the marriage of Krishna and Meera, but Krishna becomes sick during the wedding. The doctor says that Krishna's memory is returning. After many tries finally on the occasion of Krishna's birthday Krishna's memory comes back. Krishna was about to leave The Thakur family but due to Sajjan Singh Thakur's heart attack, he has to live with them, and it is also revealed that Meera is pregnant with Krishna's child. Meera slips and her child miscarriages. On the other hand, Shakti tries to molest Meera and gets caught by Krishna causing the latter throws him out of the Thakur house. Shakti kidnaps Kriti later to take revenge from Krishna. However, just in time, with no other option, Kesar shoots Shakti in the back to save Kriti, causing him to die. When his body is taken to the Thakur House, Sumitra curses all of them and blames Pratigya for being the mastermind behind the murder. Samar arrives at the Thakur House, at mourning time and angry Sumitra decides to Shraddh of Krishna too. Meera bids goodbye after getting a job in the city. Later Kesar arrives at the Thakur House after getting bail from jail. Sumitra does not allow her to enter and tries to burn her but is stopped. Samar and Sumitra decide to take revenge from Pratigya and Kesar and they start evil plans against Garv and Kriti. Soon afterwards Samar realizes his mistakes and stops supporting Sumitra and becomes a positive character. Sumitra is arrested and the rest of the Thakur family hug each other with a happy ending.

== Cast ==
=== Main ===
- Pooja Gor as Pratigya Krishna Singh Thakur – Krishna's wife; Kriti and Garv's mother; Samar and Girish's aunt
- Arhaan Behll as Krishna Singh Thakur – Sajjan and Sumitra's younger son; Shakti and Komal's brother; Pratigya's husband; Kriti and Garv's father; Samar and Girish's uncle

=== Recurring ===
- Anupam Shyam as Sajjan Singh Thakur – Sumitra's husband; Shakti, Krishna and Komal's father; Samar, Girish, Kriti and Garv's grandfather
- Asmita Sharma as Sumitra Sajjan Singh Thakur – Sajjan's wife; Shakti, Krishna and Komal's mother; Samar, Girish, Kriti and Garv's grandmother
- Bhumika Gurung / Tina Philip as Meera – Krishna's fake wife
- Sachal Tyagi as Shakti Singh Thakur – Sajjan and Sumitra's elder son; Krishna and Komal's elder brother; Kesar's husband; Samar and Girish's father (dead)
- Aalika Sheikh as Kesar Shakti Singh Thakur – Shakti's widow; Samar and Girish's mother
- Parvati Sehgal as Komal Singh Thakur / Komal Adarsh Yadav – Sajjan and Sumitra's daughter; Shakti and Krishna's younger sister; Adarsh's wife
- Shahab Khan as Shyam Saxena, Pratigya, Adarsh and Aarushi’s father (Cameo)
- Ashish Kapoor as Adarsh Yadav – Komal's husband
- Prachi Thakur as Kriti Singh Thakur – Krishna and Pratigya's daughter; Garv's elder sister; Samar and Girish's cousin
- Dhruvin Sanghvi as Garv Singh Thakur – Krishna and Pratigya's son; Kriti's younger brother; Samar and Girish's cousin
- Araham Sawant as Samar Singh Thakur – Shakti and Kesar's elder son; Girish's elder brother; Kriti and Garv's cousin
- Gouransh as Girish Singh Thakur – Shakti and Kesar's younger son; Samar's younger brother; Kriti and Garv's cousin
- Naved Raza as Aadesh Tyagi – Balwant and Sushma's son
- Chetan Hansraj as Balwant Tyagi – Dhaara's brother; Sushma's husband; Aadesh's father
- Shivani Gosain as Sushma Balwant Tyagi – Balwant's wife; Aadesh's mother
- Athar Siddiqui as Dhara Tyagi – Balwant's brother; Vimala's husband
- Supriya Kumari as Vimala Dhara Tyagi – Dhara's wife
- Sima Singh as Lakhpatiya at Sajjan Singh house

== Production ==
=== Development and premiere ===
In early 2013, Mann Kee Awaaz Pratigya was confirmed returning with a new season on StarPlus based on the story of the lead characters Pratigya and Krishna's daughters. Neha Marda was hired as a lead and the pilot episode was shot and approved by the channel but the series was dropped when the discussions between the production house and channel stalled.

The reruns of Mann Kee Awaaz Pratigya during the lockdown of COVID-19 were garnering good response on Star Plus which made the channel bring back the series. In February 2021, Pratigya 2 was planned and soon confirmed with a return on Star Bharat with a new season for which Pearl Grey stated, "Pratigya Season 2 was supposed to happen right after we wrapped the first season, but it got delayed considerably. Over the years, I kind of gave up hope for Pratigya 2. However, fans and viewers constantly demanded the show's return. The re-runs during the lockdown were much appreciated, and that’s when the channel decided to bring the show back. Merely in a span of a month, the return of the show with season 2 was planned. Everything was discussed and meetings were held, and the rest is history."

Pearl Grey, the writer and producer of the former season collaborated with Rajan Shahi for this season as creative producer. Discussing it, Shahi stated, "DKP in collaboration with Pearl will retain all the best of what worked in season 1, but season 2 will also have surprise packages of new relevance, the story, and also a fresh cast which is being added to the already great, remarkable, and talented cast of season 1."

On 23 February 2021, the production and shooting of the series began in Prayagraj in Uttar Pradesh.

The team had a havan on the sets of series for an auspicious beginning for their new journey before they started shoot in Mumbai.

=== Release ===
The first promo of the series was released on 28 February 2021 featuring Pooja Gaur and Anupam Shyam reprising their roles of Pratigya and Thakur Sajjan Singh from the former season. The next promo released on 12 March 2021 featured Arhaan Behll reprising his role of Krishna Singh from the former season.

=== Casting ===
With the release of first promo, Pooja Gaur and late Anupam Shyam were confirmed reprising their roles of Pratigya and Thakur Sajjan Singh from the former season. Arhaan Behll was also confirmed reprising his role of Krishna Singh from the former series. Asmita Sharma, Parvati Sehgal and Aalika Sheikh reprise their respective roles of Thakurain, Komal and Kesar from the former season. Sachal Tyagi was cast as Shakti Singh which was earlier played by Jaswant Menaria in the former season.

Supriya Kumari initially auditioned for the role of Chetan Hansraj character's wife but was later cast as Hansraj's brother Athar Siddiqui's wife.

=== Filming ===
Based on the backdrop of Uttar Pradesh, set in Prayagraj, the series is mainly filmed at Film city in Mumbai.

Some of the initial sequences were shot in Prayagraj in Uttar Pradesh in February 2021.

On 13 April 2021, Chief Minister of Maharashtra, Uddhav Thackeray announced a sudden curfew due to increased Covid cases, while the production halted from 14 April 2021. Soon, the team of the series decided to move their shooting location to Silvasa in Dadra and Nagar Haveli until the next hearing.

== Reception ==
=== Critics ===
Pinkvilla Mann Ki Awaaz Pratigya 2 will mark Pooja Gor and Arhaan Behll's reunion on the small screen after nine years.
