= Parvati Sehgal =

Indian television actress (born 1990)

- Born: 9 January 1990 (age 36); Jammu, India
- Occupations: Theatre Personality, Actress
- Years active: 2010–present

Parvati Sehgal (born 9 January 1990) is an Indian television actress who appeared in the Hindi television drama series like Mann Kee Awaaz Pratigya, in which she played the main character of Komal Singh Thakur Saxena.

== Career ==
In 2009, Parvati Sehgal who played Komal's role in Mann Kee Awaaz Pratigya, was originally approached for Aarushi's role but got rejected because of a look test but later got selected for Komal's role when she was approached for the second time. She participated in Comedy Circus along with Kapil Sharma. Later she acted in other TV serials like Gauna – Ek Pratha, Gustakh Dil, Sher-e-Punjab: Maharaja Ranjit Singh, The Kapil Sharma Show and Comedy Nights with Kapil.

== Television ==
Year	Title	Role	Note
2009-2012	Mann Kee Awaaz Pratigya	Komal Singh Thakur/Saxena	
2010, 2012	Comedy Circus	Guest	
2013	Ek Thhi Naayka	Chandini	
2013-2014	Gustakh Dil	Ishana	
2013-2016	Comedy Nights with Kapil	Various characters	
2015	Doli Armaano Ki	Taani Samrat Singh Rathore/Sinha	
2016-2018	Karmaphal Daata Shani	Neelima	
2017	Sher-e-Punjab: Maharaja Ranjit Singh	Roop Kaur	
2018-2019	Dastaan-E-Mohabbat Salim Anarkali	Salima Sultan Begum	
2018-2022	The Kapil Sharma Show	Various characters	Seasons 2 and 3
2019, 2020	Laal Ishq	Yashri	Episode 109
2019, 2020	Laal Ishq	Sanjana	Episode 151
2019, 2020	Laal Ishq	Suman	Episode 225
2020-2021	Aye Mere Humsafar	Bharati Mishra	
2021	Mann Kee Awaaz Pratigya 2	Komal Singh Thakur/Komal Adarsh Yadav	
2022	Banni Chow Home Delivery	Manini Rathod	
2022	Ravivaar With Star Parivaar	Manini Rathod	Episodes 1,6,7,9, and 16
2023	Gauna – Ek Pratha	Urvashi Singh Chaudhary	
2025	Jhanak	Jhanak "Nutan" Raina Bhanushali Bose	

== Web series ==
Year	Title
2024-present	Adrishyam – The Invisible Heroes
