= Sunil Prasad =

Indian film director and writer (born 1956)

- Born: 15 March 1956 (age 69); Siwan, Bihar, India
- Occupations: Film Director, Screenwriter
- Years active: 1975–present

Sunil Prasad is an Indian film director and writer.

Born in Siwan, Bihar, Sunil Prasad was a bright student. He would regularly direct plays in school and college.

== Filmography ==
Year	Project	Role	Company	Channel
2006–2007	Maatti	Director	Karma Events & Entertainment	Bhojpuri Film
2010–2011	Aashiq Biwi Ka	Director	Swarp Films	Doordarshan
2009–2010	Jab Lahu Pukaarela	Director	Le Loisir Resorts Pvt. Ltd.	Bhojpuri Film
2009–2010	Krishna Arjun	Director	Le Loisir Resorts Pvt. Ltd.	Gujrati Film
2010	Hamaari Devrani	Director	Shobhna Desai Productions	Star Plus
2010–2011	Stree Teri Kahaani	Series Director	Sharp Focus	Doordarshan
2011	Hi! Padosi... Kaun Hai Doshi?	Director	Maximum Entertainment Pvt. Ltd.	Sahara TV
1993	Pyar Pyar	Writer & Director	Sagu Films	Hindi Film
2003	Jassi Jaissi Koi Nahin	Director	DJ's A Creative Unit	Sony
