= Hai Apna Dil Toh Awara =

- Directed by: Monjoy Joy Mukerji
- Written by: Monjoy Joy Mukerji
- Starring: Sahil Anand; Herry Tangiri; Vikram Kochhar; Nilesh Lalwani; Niyati Joshi; Divvya Chouksey; Jayaka Yagnik; Sareh Far
- Release date: 2016
- Country: India
- Language: Hindi

Hai Apna Dil Toh Awara (transl. My heart is a wanderer) is a 2016 Indian Hindi-language romantic comedy film directed and written by Monjoy Joy Mukerji and starring Sahil Anand, Herry Tangiri, Vikram Kochhar, Nilesh Lalwani, Niyati Joshi, Divvya Chouksey, Jayaka Yagnik and Sareh Far.

== Synopsis ==
Hai Apna Dil Toh Awara is a story of three couples who have their own point of views about life and when their thoughts collide, it's a bull vs matador fight to the finish for them. Tony Singh, who is a perfect con artist when it comes to women has his lady love Pooja Mehta in a web of dreams around him. Rikki Dalwani's life is a beach resort where he has this perfect wife Sanya Dalwani doing all the things, from house hold work to running their boutique and he seems to be engrossed playing a game of monopoly with his friends. Saajan Patel and Sanjana Patel's life is straight from the tales of a Gujarati household story where the man is stuck between his mother's love and his duties towards the wife whenever the two women of his heart confront each other in the kitchen, which is a battle ring in the house.

Having said this and giving and taking nothing from these bright couples, the story moves towards a plan that Pooja decides to have for her man Tony, a dream getaway destination to Kashmir to spend more quality time with her man in order to move to the next level of their relationship, that is marriage (every woman's dream and a man's nightmare) They seem to be stuck on level one since the past two years. But Tony seems to be in a party mode and extends the invitation to his friends and their wives, utterly to Pooja's dismay. The other two couples love the idea and decide to join Tony and Pooja. The fresh air and the picturistic view of Kashmir totally mesmerized the three couples and love seems to be on the menu for all of them. Meeting their old friend Manjeet Singh Sodhi, the resort owner and his beautiful Persian wife Sonya Singh is a delight for all of them. The sudden shift of gear in their lives seems to be clearing the air of confusion and ego among the three couples. What follows next are a series of events in their lives that makes them realize that how precious their lives are and the importance of love among them which seemed to have been lost in the chaotic city of Mumbai.

== Cast ==
- Sahil Anand as Tony Singh
- Niyati Joshi as Pooja Mehta
- Vikram Kochhar as Rikki Dalwani
- Divvya Chouksey as Sanya Dalwani
- Nilesh Lalwani as Sajan Patel
- Jayaka Yagnik as Sanjana Patel
- Vandita Shrivastava in a guest appearance in the title song

== Production ==
Hai Apna Dil Toh Awara has been shot in various locations like Mumbai and Jammu and Kashmir. Most of it is shot in the picturesque locations of Jammu and Kashmir.
