= Aasmaan Se Gira =

1992 film directed by Pankaj Parashar

- Poster
- Directed by: Pankaj Parashar
- Written by: Pankaj Parashar
- Produced by: Children's Film Society, India (CFSI)
- Starring: Raghubir Yadav; Abhishek Chitlangia; Tisca Chopra; Kurush Deboo; Amjad Khan; Kalpana Iyer
- Narrated by: Shabana Azmi
- Cinematography: Sunil Sharma
- Edited by: Afaq Hussain
- Music by: Louis Banks
- Release date: 4 September 1992
- Running time: 88 minutes
- Country: India
- Language: Hindi

Aasmaan Se Gira (transl. Fallen from the Sky) is an Indian Hindi-language children's film written and directed by Pankaj Parashar, released on 4 September 1992. The film featured Raghubir Yadav, Abhishek Chitlangia, Rakesh Shrivastava, Sunil Ranade, Kurush Deboo, Amjad Khan and Kalpana Iyer in leading roles. The film also has a host of Bollywood actors in guest appearances including Sridevi, Anil Kapoor, Tisca Chopra and Anupam Kher. This was Tisca Chopra's debut film. She was credited with Tisca Arora in the film which is her maiden name.

== Plot ==
A young prince unsatisfied with his restrictive royal lifestyle encounters a mystical man whom he called Trishanku, who has come from another planet. Over the time, their friendship blooms, and young prince experiences joy and liberation through their bond. But soon, Trishanku has to return to his home.

== Cast ==
- Abhishek Chitlangia - Kautuk
- Raghubir Yadav - Trishanku
- Anupam Kher - Mad person at the sanitarium
- Amjad Khan - Alien ruler
- Kalpana Iyer - Masheela
- Kurush Deboo - Royal Philosophy Teacher
- Sridevi - Forest Goddess
- Anil Kapoor - Himself

== Soundtrack ==
The film had six tracks which were written by Kamlesh Pandey and the music was composed by Louis Banks.

Track#	Title	Singer(s)
1	"Ghar Jaanam - 1"	Shailendra, Suresh Wadkar
2	"Ghar Jaanam - 2"	Suresh Wadekar
3	"Ghar Jaanam - 3"	Shailendra
4	"Ghar Jaanam - Duet"	Suresh Wadkar, Kavita Krishnamurti
5	"Mujhe Ghara Jana Hai"	Raghubir Yadav, Master Abhishek
6	"Roop Ki Raani"	Hema Sardesai

== Release ==
The film was released on 4 September 1992. Anil Kapoor and Sridevi were wrongly projected as the lead pair for the publicity but they only had guest appearances in the film.
