= Mann Kee Awaaz Pratigya =

2009 Indian television series

- Genre: Drama; Romance
- Created by: Spellbound Productions; Walkwater Media Ltd
- Written by: Pearl Grey; Shanti Bhushan; Vishal Watwani; Ahsan Bakshi
- Directed by: Ravindra Gautam; Prasad Govandi; Santosh Bhatt; Jatin Ravasia; Gurpreet Rana; Arvind Gupta; Sandeep Vijay
- Creative director: Pearl Grey
- Starring: Pooja Gor; Arhaan Behll
- Country of origin: India
- Original languages: Hindi; Awadhi
- No. of seasons: 2
- No. of episodes: 767

Production
- Executive producer: Pearl Grey
- Producer: Pearl Grey
- Editor: Sameer Gandhi
- Running time: 20-22 minutes
- Production companies: Spellbound Productions; Walkwater Media Ltd

Original release
- Network: Star Plus
- Release: 7 December 2009 – 27 October 2012

Related
- Mann Kee Awaaz Pratigya 2

Mann Kee Awaaz Pratigya (transl. The Voice from the Heart... Pledge) is an Indian drama television series that aired on STAR Plus. The series premiered on 7 December 2009 and ended on 27 October 2012. It starred Pooja Gor and Arhaan Behll. All episodes of the series re-telecasted at Star Bharat from October 2020 to March 2021. A new season of the series, Mann Kee Awaaz Pratigya 2, premiered on 15 March 2021 on Star Bharat, produced by Director's Kut Productions.

== Plot ==
The story focuses on a young, strong-minded woman, Pratigya Saxena, who will go to any length to fight for her rights, and Krishna Singh Thakur, an uneducated goon. The Thakurs, headed by Krishna's father, Sajjan Singh Thakur, hold power in Allahabad, and are rooted deep in tradition and superstition. The Saxena family, however, are traditional but believe in progressive thinking and educating their daughters Pratigya and Aarushi.

Krishna, Pratigya's secret admirer, forces her to marry him. To protect Pratigya, her elder brother Adarsh marries Komal, Krishna's younger sister. Pratigya is not satisfied with her marriage, but over time she realizes Krishna's genuine love for her and makes it her mission to change Krishna’s patriarchal views and ways. Meanwhile, she is constantly taunted by her in-laws, while Krishna’s elder brother, Shakti, beats his wife, Kesar, regularly.

Angad, Pratigya's stalker from college, is killed in an altercation between him and Adarsh. Pratigya’s father takes the blame but is proven innocent by an advocate, Aman Mathur, despite Sajjan’s efforts to influence the case. Krishna, shocked by Pratigya’s duplicity, leaves the home and is injured. She later finally confesses her love to him, and they consummate their marriage. Meanwhile, Aarushi falls for Aman and their marriage is fixed, while his younger brother, Jay, intentionally hits Adarsh with his father's car, causing serious injury and forcing him to walk on a wheelchair. Pratigya and Krishna, smelling foul, find out that Aman is cheating on Aarushi and disclose this to Aman’s father (a police officer who has a rivalry with Sajjan), who calls off the wedding. Aarushi, swearing revenge, marries Shakti, despite the law declaring bigamy to be illegal, and impresses the Thakurs. She later realizes her mistake and leaves Shakti.

Pratigya finds out about Krishna’s lie of getting a job and is heartbroken. During the Holi celebrations, Krishna’s cousin, Radhe, misbehaves with Pratigya. Learning this, Krishna chases him, who unintentionally shoots Pratigya. After her recovery, Krishna starts his food business but Radhe destroys it. Pratigya’s mother-in-law, conspiring to separate Krishna and Pratigya, attempts suicide, and Pratigya is blamed by Sajjan and Krishna. Krishna later learns the truth and tries to reunite with Pratigya, who reluctantly accepts him. Sajjan soon marries a younger woman, Ganga, but learns of her affair with a man and is convinced to let her go.

4 years later, Shakti, while beating Kesar, causes her to lose her mind, causing her to be mentally unstable. As a result, Pratigya starts caring for Shakti and Kesar's son, Samar. Shakti marries Menaka, who wants to usurp the property of the Thakur family. Abhimanyu Singh Yadav, Sajjan's illegitimate son, emerges and stakes claim to his rights and starts planning against the family. Meanwhile, in the Saxena household, Tanmay Srivastav, Aarushi's husband, plans to kill Adarsh and frames Krishna for Adarsh's murder after killing him. Later, Pratigya, with the help of her lawyer, proves Krishna innocent and Tanmay is sentenced to life imprisonment, divorced by Aarushi. Abhimanyu too tries to kill Komal and her daughter Chinky when Komal finds out his true colors, but both are saved by Kartik, Krishna and Pratigya. Abhimanyu's truth comes in front of everyone, and he is arrested. Later, Komal marries Kartik after Chinky pleads and requests Sajjan Singh for the marriage. Krishna's mother returns after a long struggle, but Sajjan initially rejects her for staying with another man. He later accepts her on Dussehra when she tries to kill herself. The show takes a leap when Pratigya and Krishna officially adopt Samar. The show ends with Pratigya giving birth to a daughter, and the whole family celebrates.

== Cast ==
=== Main ===
- Pooja Gaur as Pratigya Singh Thakur (née Saxena): Naina and Shyam's elder daughter (2009−2012)
- Arhaan Behll as Krishna Singh Thakur: Sajjan and Sumitra's younger son (2009−2012)

=== Recurring ===
- Amita Udgata as Mrs. Singh Thakur: Sajjan's mother; Shakti, Krishna, Komal and Abhimanyu's grandmother (2009-2012)
- Anupam Shyam as Sajjan Singh Thakur: Sumitra's husband (2009–2012)
- Asmita Sharma as Sumitra Singh Thakur: Sankata's sister; (2009–2012)
- Jaswant Menaria as Shakti Singh Thakur: Sajjan and Sumitra's elder son (2009–2012)
- Kalpna Bohra / Aalika Sheikh as Kesar Singh Thakur: Shakti's first wife; Samar's mother (2009–2012)
- Eklavya Ahir as Samar Singh Thakur: Kesar and Shakti's son (2011–2012)
- Malhar Pandya as Girish Singh Thakur: Shakti and Kesar's younger son (2012)
- Soni Singh as Menaka Singh Thakur: Shakti's second wife (2011)
- Mohit Malik as Advocate Abhimanyu Singh Yadav: Sajjan and Shakuntala's son; Shakti, Krishna and Komal's half-brother (2011–2012)
- Asha Sharma as Mrs. Saxena: Shyam's mother; Adarsh, Pratigya and Aarushi's grandmother (2009–2012)
- Shahab Khan as Shyam Saxena: Naina's widower (2009–2012)
- Monica Singh as Naina Saxena: Shyam's wife; (2009–2011) (Dead)
- Ankit Gera / Aniruddh Singh as Adarsh Saxena: Naina and Shyam's son (2009–2011) / (2012) (Dead)
- Parvati Sehgal as Komal Singh Thakur Kumar: Sajjan and Sumitra's daughter (2009–2012)
- Drishti Hemdev as Chinky Saxena: Adarsh and Komal's daughter (2011–2012)
- Arya Dhramchand Kumar as Kartik Kumar: Komal's second husband (2012)
- Avantika Hundal as Aarushi Saxena: Naina and Shyam's younger daughter (2009–2012)
- Abhishek Rawat as Tanmay Srivastav: Aarushi's ex-husband; Adarsh's murderer (2011)
- Kunal Karan Kapoor as Angad Yadav: Thug; Pratigya and Komal's foe (2009) (Dead)
- Mrunal Jain as ASP Iqbal Khan: IPS Officer; Shyam's student; Pratigya and Aarushi's childhood friend; Krishna and Komal's wellwisher (2009–2012)
- Sehrish Ali as Roli: Pratigya's best friend; Adarsh's lover (2010)
- Abner Reginald as Judge (2010)
- Chetan Pandit as I.G. Sarveshwardayal Mathur: Gaurav, Aman and Jay's father (2010)
- Pooja Madan as Mrs Mathur: Sarveshwardayal's wife: Gaurav, Aman and Jay's mother (2010)
- Sachin Sharma as Gaurav Mathur: Sarveshwardayal's eldest son; Aman and Jay's brother; Nandini's husband (2010)
- Monica Casetellino as Nandini Mathur: Gaurav's wife (2010)
- Mayank Arora as Jay Mathur: Sarveshwardayal's youngest son; Gaurav and Aman's brother (2010)
- Piyush Sahdev as Advocate Aman Mathur: Sarveshwardayal's second son; Gaurav and Jay's brother; Aarushi's ex-fiancé; Anu's husband (2010–2011)
- Deeya Chopra as Anu Mathur: Aman's wife (2011)
- Akhilendra Mishra as Sankata Singh: Sumitra's brother (2011)
- Sana Amin Sheikh as Ganga: Sajjan's mistress (2011)
- Manmohan Tiwari as Radhe
- Prachi Pathak as Maayi
- Kunal Jaisingh as Sarang "Gunga" (2011)
- Kunal Madhiwala as Lucky
- Dinesh Sudarshan Soi as Jugnu
- Vinay Rajput as Tunna
- Pratima Kazmi as Guru Maa
- Sonal Jha as Shakuntala: Sajjan's mistress; Abhimanyu's mother (2012)
- Nirbhay Wadhwa as Goon
- Raj Premi as Makhnu Singh
- Jaydeep Suri as Chandu
- Ruchi Savarn as Sunehri (2011)
- Chaitanya Choudhury as Abhishek: Neelima's husband; Pratigya's college friend (2011)
- Akanksha Juneja as Neelima: Abhishek's wife; Pratigya's college friend (2011)
- Neha Kaul as Meera: Krishna's one–sided lover (2011)
- Deepak Advani as Mr. Batra: Abhishek and Neelima's boss (2011)
- Deepika Singh as Sandhya
- Sanaya Irani as Khushi
- Manasi Parekh as Gulaal

== Production ==
=== Promotion ===
As a part of promotion of the series before its launch, in December 2009, a campaign was done as Meri Pratigya at Nariman Point in Mumbai where along with lead Pooja Gor, 500 women as a chain to create an awareness on eve-teasing and ill treatment of women.

=== Casting ===
Parvati Sehgal who played Komal's role in the show was originally approached for Aarushi's role but got rejected because of a look test but later got selected for Komal's role when she was approached for the second time.

Falaq Naaz was originally signed to play an uneducated village girl Shakun in the show who was Abhimanyu's wife but things couldn't work out as she chose another show of Star Plus Khamoshiyan later her role got scrapped from the show. Rohit Khurana was finalized for Krishna's role but rejected it as he was busy with Uttaran at that time.

In mid 2011, Monica Singh playing Naina quit the series and was hoped for coming back after a break. However, as she refused returning, the makers decided to end her character and she agreed to shoot for two days but did not turn up. Thus, her character was mentioned dead in a car accident.

=== Cancellation and future ===
The series was off aired in October 2012. In early 2013, the series was confirmed returning with a new season based on story of lead character Pratigya and Krishna's daughters. Neha Marda was roped as one of the leads and the pilot episode was shot and approved by the channel but the series was dropped when the discussions between the production house and channel stalled. However, on 19 February 2021, the series was confirmed returning with a new season on Star Bharat. Mann Kee Awaaz Pratigya 2 premiered on 15 March 2021, is produced by former season producer Pearl Grey along with Rajan Shahi under Director's Kut Productions.

=== Filming ===
Based on the backdrop of Uttar Pradesh, Allahabad, the series was mainly filmed at sets in Film city in Mumbai while some sequences were also shot at Allahabad.

== Reception ==
=== Critics ===
The Indian Express stated, "It's a perfect Hindi heartland show - over-the-top drama and aggressive, regressive as well as progressive in characters and content."

In November 2010, Deccan Herald criticised, "The serial that broke many a record on Star Plus because of its unique anti-eve teasing storyline, seems to have changed track completely. Today, it’s boiled down to a tale where a woman is humiliated at home, her self respect trampled on by her in-laws and husband instead of portraying her to be a strong woman who stands her ground."

The Hindu criticised, "From the current crop of serials, a very good example of enthusiastic consumption of a bizarre plot line is the serial “Mann ki Awaaz Pratigya”. The production house, Star TV, bills it a “fight against disrespect of women”. And what does the lead character do? She marries a goon who eve-teases her. Then she tells him that he can win her body but not her love. You fight disrespect by marrying the eve-teaser, taking the battle into his home."

=== Ratings ===
Pratigya opened with a rating of 3.7 TVR. As in April 2010, it was one of the top ten Hindi GEC which garnered 4.5 TVR. As in July 2010, it was at second position with ratings ranging 4 to 5.3 TVR. In weeks 24 and 25 of 2010, it garnered 4.8 and 5.5 TVRs. In week 4 of 2011, it garnered 5.7 TVR. As in week 29 of 2011, it dropped to 3.9 TVR while its peak ratings garnered were around 6 TVR in its run time. In the week ending 27 September 2011, it garnered 4.27 TVR occupying fourth position. When the ratings dropped ranging between 2 and 2.5 TVR, it was off aired in October 2012.

== Awards ==
Year	Awards	Category	Recipient	Result
2010	Indian Television Academy Awards	Best Serial	Mann Kee Awaaz Pratigya	Won
2011	Indian Television Academy Awards	Best Actor – Drama – Popular	Krishna (Arhaan Behll)	Won
2011	Kalakar Awards	Favourite Actress in Television	Pratigya (Pooja Gor)	Won
2011	Zee Gold Awards	Best Negative Actor(Male) – Popular	Anupam Shyam	Won
2012	Indian Telly Awards	Best Actor in Negative Role (Jury)	Sajjan Singh (Anupam Shyam)	Won
2012	Indian Telly Awards	Best Actress in Negative Role (Jury)	Takurain (Asmita Sharma)	Won
2012	Indian Telly Awards	Best actor in childhood	Amir singh (Saurav Singh)	Won
2012	Zee Gold Awards	Best Negative Actor – Male	Anupam Shyam	Won
