= Ek Nayi Ummeed Roshni =

Indian television series

- Genre: Medical Drama
- Created by: Pulse Media Prvt. Ltd.
- Written by: Sanjay Tripathy
- Directed by: Suhail Tatari; Shahab Ali Khan
- Creative directors: Anukriti Pandey; Dipika Sikand
- Starring: See below
- Country of origin: India
- Original language: Hindi
- No. of seasons: 1
- No. of episodes: 90

Production
- Producers: Kaveee Kumar; Vineet Yadav
- Production locations: Mumbai; London
- Cinematography: Shyamanand Jha
- Camera setup: Multi-camera
- Running time: 22 minutes
- Production company: Pulse Media Pvt. Ltd.

Original release
- Network: Life OK
- Release: 13 July – 13 November 2015

Ek Nayi Ummeed – Roshni (English: A New Hope – Roshni) is an Indian medical drama television series, which premiered on 13 July 2015 and broadcast on Life OK. The series aired on Monday through Friday nights. The series was produced by Pulse Media Entertainment. The series was shot in London. The shooting of the entire series was held in a real hospital. Pooja Gor and Sahil Anand play the female and male lead roles respectively.

== Cast ==
- Pooja Gor as Dr. Roshni Singh
- Sahil Anand as Dr. Nikhil Malhotara aka Nik
- Himmanshoo A. Malhotra as Dr. Sameer Purohit
- Amol Palekar as Dr. Amar Kishore Singh
- Raghubir Yadav as Badri
- Anjali Pandey as Mona
- Imran Javed as Dr. Nitin Patel aka Doodle
- Kurush Deboo as Dr. Anand Singh
- Divya Seth Shah as Dr. Vasundhara Singh
- Inderjeet Sagoo as Dr. Rajat Singh
- Aakash Sahay as Sharad
- Kalpesh Rajgor as Dr. Rastogi
- Rahul Vora as Dr. Raghunandan
