= Raj Singh Arora =

Indian actor

- Occupation: Actor
- Years active: 2004–2023

Raj Singh Arora is an Indian television actor, best known for his role as Yuvraj in the Star One series Remix. He played Mihir Arora in Yeh Hai Mohabbatein.

== Personal life and career ==
Arora has been in a relationship with Pooja Gor since 2009. They separated in 2020, as confirmed by Gor in her Instagram post.

He started his career as a VJ and started making music videos. Arora made his acting debut in the TV serial Remix on Star One. Arora is best known for the character Yuvraj Dev, also known as Yuvi, in the Star One show Remix. He has recently appeared in the show on Channel V, V The Serial. He later starred as Ashu in the show Kahaani Ghar Ghar Kii, as Rattu in Four, and also appeared in an episode of Ek Thhi Naayka on Life OK and Yeh Hai Aashiqui . He starred in a few films such as Teri Meri Kahaani and Peter Gaya Kam Se. He portrayed Mihir Arora in the soap opera Yeh Hai Mohabbatein from 2013–2017.

== Filmography ==
=== Television ===
Year	Show	Role
2004–2006	Remix	Yuvraj Dev/Yuvi
2006–2008	Kahaani Ghar Ghar Kii	Ashutosh Mehra/Ashu
2007	Four	Ratanlal
2012–2013	V The Serial	Raj Singh Arora
2013	Yeh Hai Aashiqui	Aditya
2013	Ek Thhi Naayka	Chandan
2013–2017	Yeh Hai Mohabbatein	Mihir Arora
2016	Box Cricket League	Himself

=== Films ===
Year	Movie	Role	Notes
2010	Vroom		
2011	Mumbai Cutting		
2012	Teri Meri Kahaani		
2013	Jayantabhai Ki Luv Story	Kunal	
2013	Sahasam	Dilawar	
2015	Peter Gaya Kaam Se		
2015	Gabbar is Back	Govind	
2016	Killing veerappan	Gopal	
2023	Rocky Aur Rani Kii Prem Kahaani	Rehan (board member)	

== Awards and nominations ==
Year	Award	Category	Show	Result
2015	Gold Awards	Best Actor in a Supporting Role	Yeh Hai Mohabbatein	Won
2016	Gold Awards	Best Actor in a Supporting Role	Yeh Hai Mohabbatein	Won
2017	Gold Awards	Best Actor in a Supporting Role	Yeh Hai Mohabbatein	Nominated
