= Ek Thhi Naayka =

- Created by: Ekta Kapoor
- Starring: Huma Qureshi; Jannat Zubair Rahmani; Ankita Lokhande; Sachin Shroff; Sumona Chakravarti; Jaya Bhattacharya; Saurabh Raj Jain; Sakshi Tanwar; Smriti Irani; Mouli Ganguly; Shweta Tiwari
- Country of origin: India
- Original language: Hindi
- No. of seasons: 1
- No. of episodes: 16

Production
- Producers: Ekta Kapoor; Shobha Kapoor
- Camera setup: Multi-camera
- Running time: Approx. 48 minutes
- Production company: Balaji Telefilms

Original release
- Network: Life OK
- Release: 9 March – 28 April 2013

Related
- Ek Thi Daayan

Ek Thhi Naayka is a 16-episode Hindi-language Indian television horror thriller mini-series which premiered on 9 March 2013 on Life OK. Each episode of the series features a new female protagonist who fights against witches and demonic entities, signifying the triumph of good over evil. The series was produced by Ekta Kapoor, the joint managing director of the Balaji Telefilms, to promote her then upcoming film, Ek Thi Daayan.

== Plot ==
Episode 1 & 2 : Vishal visits his native along with his wife, Pragya. The driver suggests Vishal and Pragya to go to the temple outside the village, and perform a ritual so that they are protected from the evil spirits. But, Vishal ignores him. Vishal's sister-in-law, Malti informs Pragya that she is pregnant. Pragya has a nightmare in which some witches try to abduct her. Later, she sees that Malti has inverted feet. Pragya again has a nightmare in which a lot of witches have gathered around her with Malti. Pragya and Vishal visit the hospital for Pragya's check-up. The doctor informs Pragya that she is pregnant. After a series of happenings, Vishal and Pragya return to Mumbai. Later, Pragya gives birth to a girl in Kolhapur. Malti takes the child to make her a disciple of the evil lord. Pragya tries to rescue her baby. She becomes shocked to see Vishal working with Malti. Pragya and Vishal's mother manage to dispel the evil, and save the baby.

Episode 3 & 4 : Tanushree is a very famous theater artist from Kolkata. She conducts a play recreating her past with her mentor, Uma di. Uma di appears in Tanushrees's dream and blames her for her suicide. Laboni, a struggling actress, manages to get a role in Tanushree's play. During the play, Tanushree imagines Laboni to be Uma di and faints. She suspects Laboni to be Uma di's daughter and fears that she has come to avenge her death. Tanushree calls Konkona Sen and invites her for the Kali puja. Tanushree is suspicious about Laboni being a witch, as Laboni refuses to enter the temple. Konkona enlightens Tanushree about the powers of a witch, and also tells her that a witch could be killed if her hair is chopped. Tanushree confronts Laboni about being a witch. Laboni tells Tanushree that she is Uma Di herself, and has reincarnated to avenge her death. Later during the play Tanushree kills Laboni by chopping her hair

Episode 5 & 6 : Swati, a school teacher, does not believe in ghosts. She gets engaged to Mukesh, who is a single parent. After the engagement ceremony, a lady gestures Swati to follow her to the forest. Nayan and his brother save her from an animal trap. During the marriage rituals, she sees the lady again. She learns that the lady is Chhavi, Mukesh's first wife. Mukesh disbelieves her when she tells him about the same. They have a heated argument, during which Mukesh confesses to killing his first wife. Dr. Palit summons Chhavi's spirit in front of Swati. He gets possessed by the spirit. Chhavi's spirit narrates the incident about her murder. Saloni discusses with Parthiv about Chhavi's murder. Swati overhears the conversation and doubts their involvement in the murder. The family members are astonished to see Chhavi. Swati reveals that she and Chhavi together conspired to find the real murderer. Baa admits her misdeed. The police arrest Baa. Mukesh thanks Swati for reuniting him with Chhavi.

Episode 7 & 8 : Chandan and Juhi come to take pictures of a minister's daughter, Pari, on her birthday. Juhi sees a spirit of an old lady at the railway station. Moreover, Chandan becomes shocked to see Pari, as she looks like his sister. Rajjo's spirit takes possession of Pari's body and kills a couple of her father's men. Pari's father calls a black magician to help Pari get rid of the spirit. But, Chandan assumes that his sister has taken rebirth as Pari and does not let the magician operate on her. The black magician knows that Rajjo's spirit is going to kill Purohit using Pari, but still he fails to stop her from killing Purohit. Juhi learns from Chandan's friend that he did not have any sister. Juhi confronts Chandan, and learns that Pari's father and his men killed his mother and he is a demon. The black magician assigns Juhi to find Chandan's mother's skeleton to save Pari. Juhi finds Chandan's mother's skeleton and kills Chandan using his mother's bone, before he could kill Pari and his father.

Episode 9 & 10 : While Mousin and Razia go to visit a mosque, a girl comes in front of their car. They tend to her and bring her home. They allow her to stay with them and name her as Ghazal. Two pigeons die when Ghazal enters the house. As Minaaz starts hating Ghazal, Ghazal makes a pot to fall on her head. Ghazal's parents come to take her with them, but they meet with an accident. Ghazal returns to Razia's house. Mousin's mother learns that Ghazal is an evil soul. Ghazal kills her and vows to kill Razia. Ghazal attempts to kill Razia by making a chandelier fall on her, but fails. Mousin is delighted to know about Razia's pregnancy. Razia becomes suspicious of Ghazal and consults a shaman. She learns that Ghazal is an evil soul. Ghazal accompanies Mousin as he goes out to finalize a land deal. Mousin is shocked to learn that Ghazal is a spirit of Nazleen, his old lover, who died because of him. As Ghazal tries to kill Razia, she chants a sacred mantra and kills her.

Episode 11 & 12 : Veer and Aaniya throw a party for their house warming ceremony. Mahhi's hand gets stuck inside the refrigerator in the party. Veer lifts Aaniya and throws her out of the house. She goes to Chandni's house for shelter. When she returns home, she finds that the location of the furniture has changed. She notices a shadow while Veer washes his face. In the midnight, Veer plays damaru in the rain. Guru tries to help Aaniya, but dies in an accident. Aaniya learns that Chandni is using black magic to win Veer's love. Aaniya panics on seeing Veer's health and requests Chandni to save him. On touching the hair of the dog, Chandini becomes anxious and falls down from the balcony. Veer recovers in a year but Chandni's spirit takes possession of his body. Aaniya informs Veer's mother about Chandni's spirit. Guru Maa instructs Aaniya to tie a thread on the door to lock Chandni's spirit inside the house. She asks her to burn Chandni's dead body. UD dies while saving Aaniya. Aaniya burns Chandni's dead body.

Episode 13 & 14 : Pooja, a producer, comes to a haveli in Jaipur for a shooting. The villagers beat two men when they accuse Pooja of asking for alcohol, the previous night. The next day, the two men prove to the village headmen and the villagers that they were telling the truth. Pooja becomes angry when the village headman confronts her about the same. The Raja of the haveli asks Sajjan Singh to make arrangements for a havan. The same night, Nikhil, Manasi and the crew witness Pooja behaving weirdly. Nikhil and Manasi bring Pooja to the hospital. The doctor suspects Pooja of suffering from Dissociative Identity Disorder, but the Sarpanch suspects that she is possessed by Padmini's spirit. Nikhil and Manasi learn that Raja Uday Veer Singh killed a witch, Padmini, to save the villagers. Pooja behaves weirdly in front of her crew. Raja Uday Veer Singh tries to dispel Padmini's spirit from Pooja's body. Padmini's spirit forces him to reveal how he killed her and her family, after molesting her.

Episode 15 & 16 : Veera is haunted by same nightmares. Santo gifts Veera a holiday package to Paris, on her birthday. She becomes sad after forbidding Veera from attending Rakesh's marriage. Santo becomes worried on seeing Veera at home. Rakesh informs her that he has requested Veera to come, and assures her that he will take care of Veera. Santo finally allows Veera to stay. Rakesh takes Veera and Mahi for dinner. Veera follows Mahi to an old mansion. She becomes shocked on seeing her hanging from the ceiling. Rakesh yells at Veera when she tells him that she has seen Mahi hanging from the ceiling in a mansion. A priest informs Veera about her family history. He becomes surprised when Veera chants the Shiva Stuti without having its knowledge. Veera asks her mother about their family's curse, but in vain. Mahi confesses that she had killed their family members. The shaman who was controlling Mahi desires to kill Veera and drink her blood to attain immortality. Finally, Veera defeats the Shaman.

== Cast ==
- Huma Qureshi as Herself
- Sachin Shroff as Vishal
- Ankita Lokhande as Pragya
- Mihika Verma as Malti
- Mouli Ganguly as Tanushree Dasgupta
- Sudha Chandran as Uma Biswas
- Sumona Chakravarti as Laboni
- Smriti Irani as Swati
- Amar Upadhyay as Mukesh Mehta
- Jaya Bhattacharya as Chhavi Mehta
- Raj Singh Arora as Chandan
- Abigail Jain as Maahi
- Shweta Tiwari as Juhi
- Jannat Zubair Rahmani as Pari
- Bhanu Uday as Mohsin
- Aamna Sharif as Razia
- Neha Kaul as Nazneen
- Pooja Gaur as Anya
- Vishal Gandhi as Veer
- Parvati Sehgal as Chandini
- Sakshi Tanwar as Pooja
- Deepak Qazir as Raja Sahab
- Manasi Varma as Mansi
- Yash Tonk as Dheeraj Dasgupta
- Sunny Goraya as Shoaib
- Saurabh Raj Jain as Yudi
- Surinder Kaur as Maaji
- Deepak Jethi as Sameer
- Kritika Kamra as Veera
- Rashad Aslam as Raj
- Rashid Zeema as Rajesh Verma
- Ekirah Zeema as Milli
- Amit Bhardwaj as Inspector
- Farzana Zeema as Milla
- Zarah Zeema as Apeka
- Akash Aeyma as Ranju
- Solena Mensin Hassan as Ukeraiyah Harmer
