= Arhaan Behll =

Indian television actor (born 1984)

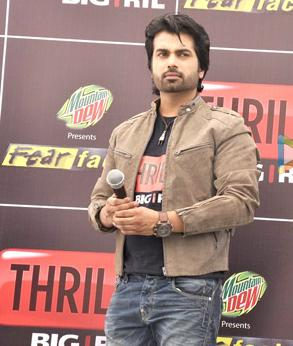
- Arhaan Behll
- Born: 6 August 1984 (age 42); India
- Occupation: Television actor
- Years active: 2009–present
- Known for: Mann Kee Awaaz Pratigya; Do Dil Bandhe Ek Dori Se; Vish Ya Amrit: Sitara; Yehh Jadu Hai Jinn Ka!
- Height: 5 ft 10 in (1.78 m)

Arhaan Behll (born 6 August 1984) is an Indian television actor. He rose to prominence for his portrayal of Krishna Singh Thakur in Star Plus's Mann Kee Awaaz Pratigya.

He later hosted Fear Factor – Khatron Se Takkar and appeared in television series such as Do Dil Bandhe Ek Dori Se, Vish Ya Amrit: Sitara and Yehh Jadu Hai Jinn Ka!.

In 2021, he reprised his role as Krishna Singh Thakur in Star Bharat's Mann Kee Awaaz Pratigya 2.

== Television ==
| Year | Show | Role | Notes |
|---|---|---|---|
| 2009–2012 | Mann Kee Awaaz Pratigya | Krishna Singh Thakur | Lead Role |
| 2013–2014 | Do Dil Bandhe Ek Dori Se | Raghu Seharia | Lead Role |
| 2015 | Chakravartin Ashoka Samrat | Samrat Chandragupta Maurya | Cameo Role |
| 2015–2016 | Ranbheri | Abhay / Ranveer | Lead Role |
| 2016 | Darr Sabko Lagta Hai – Putliwadi | Aditya (Episode 20) | Episodic Role |
| 2018–2019 | Vish Ya Amrit: Sitara | Viraj Singh | Lead Role |
| 2019–2020 | Yehh Jadu Hai Jinn Ka! | Kabir Khan | Negative Role |
| 2021 | Mann Kee Awaaz Pratigya 2 | Krishna Singh Thakur | Lead Role |
| 2022 | Gud Se Meetha Ishq | Dev Shergill | Supporting Role |

=== Reality Shows ===
| Year | Show | Role |
|---|---|---|
| 2010 | Zara Nachke Dikha | Host |
| 2011 | Comedy Ka Maha Muqabala | Contestant |
| 2013 | Fear Factor – Khatron Se Takkar | Host |

=== Films ===
| Year | Film | Role | Notes |
|---|---|---|---|
| 2013 | Desi Dude. | | Punjabi film |

== Awards ==
| Year | Award | Category |
|---|---|---|
| 2011 | Gold Awards | Gold Debut (Male) |
| 2011 | ITA Award | Best Actor (Male) |
| 2013 | Zee Rishtey | Favourite Beta (Jury Award) |
