= Life-Line Hospital =

Hospital in Damak, Jhapa, Nepal

Life-Line Hospital লাইফ-লাইন হাসপাতাল

Geography
- Location: Jhapa, Nepal

Organisation
- Type: hospital

Life-Line Hospital (LLH; Nepali: লাইফ-লাইন হাসপাতাল) is a private hospital in Damak of Jhapa, Nepal.
