= Sahil Anand =

Indian actor (born 1985)

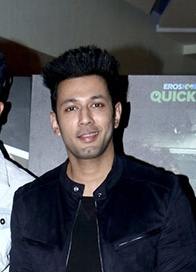
- Sahil Anand (2019)
- Born: 1 January 1985 (age 41); Chandigarh, India
- Occupation: Actor
- Known for: Student of the Year (2012); Kasautii Zindagii Kay (2018)
- Spouse: Ranjeet Monga (m. 2011)
- Children: 1

Sahil Anand (born 1 January 1985) is an Indian actor known for starring in the films Student of the Year and Babloo Happy Hai, the Voot Select series Banned and the television series Kasautii Zindagii Kay. He debuted his career with the reality show MTV Roadies 4 and was also part of Bigg Boss 10 as a celebrity contestant. He has done around 60 TV commercials and 3 music videos.

== Personal life ==
Anand married Ranjeet Monga, a worker in a corporate firm in December 2011. The couple had their first child, a boy on 14 April 2021.

== Filmography ==
=== Film ===
Key
†	Denotes films that are in production

Year	Film	Role	Notes	Ref
2012	Student of the Year	Jeet Khurana	Film Debut	
2013	Bang Bang Bangkok			
2014	Babloo Happy Hai	Jatin		
2016	Hai Apna Dil Toh Awara	Tony Singh		
2016	Love Day - Pyaar Ka Din	Sandy		
2019	Student of the Year 2	Jeet Khurana	Cameo	

== Television ==
Year	Name	Role	Notes	Ref
2006	MTV Roadies 4	Contestant		
2008	MTV Splitsvilla 1	Contestant		
2010	Mera Naam Karegi Roshan	Bhrisham		
2010	Rang Badalti Odhani	Akshay		
2011	Sasural Simar Ka	Shailendra Bhardwaj		
2012	Sabse bade ladaiya	Udal		
2015	Ek Nayi Ummeed - Roshni	Nikhil		
2016	Bigg Boss 10	Contestant	Entered as wild card, evicted Day 55	
2018–2020	Kasautii Zindagii Kay 2	Anupam Sengupta		
