= Neha Kaul =

Indian actress

- Born: Kashmir, India
- Occupation: Actress / Model

Neha Kaul is an Indian actress. She started her career with the TV show Zindagi Ka Har Rang...Gulaal and then played the role of Naina in Love Marriage Ya Arranged Marriage. In 2013, she played the role of Nazneen in Ek Thhi Naayka. In 2015, she played the role of Bhagwati in Tu Mera Hero.

She is known for playing the role of Shogata Kant in the TV show Bahu Hamari Rajni Kant, which aired on Life OK.

== Filmography ==
Year	Film	Role
2011	Tanu Weds Manu	Ayushi
2014	Hate Story 2	Mandar's wife

== Television ==
Year	Serial	Role
2010–2011	Zindagi Ka Har Rang...Gulaal	Sudha
2010–2011	Godh Bharaai	Avni
2012–2013:	Love Marriage Ya Arranged Marriage	Naina Ghelot
2013	Ek Thhi Naayka	Nazneen
2014	Devon Ke Dev...Mahadev	Devi Indumati
2014	Savdhaan India	Simmi
2014–2015	Tu Mera Hero	Bhagwati Agarwal
2016	Dahleez	Leela
2016–2017	Bahu Hamari Rajni Kant	Shogata Amrish Kant / Shogata Devendra Bangdu (Shogu)
2018	Bitti Business Wali	Alankrita
2023–2024	Dhruv Tara – Samay Sadi Se Pare	Sona
2026	Taara	Arushi
2026	Sairaab	Dr. Angana Basu
