= Uttran =

- Residential district
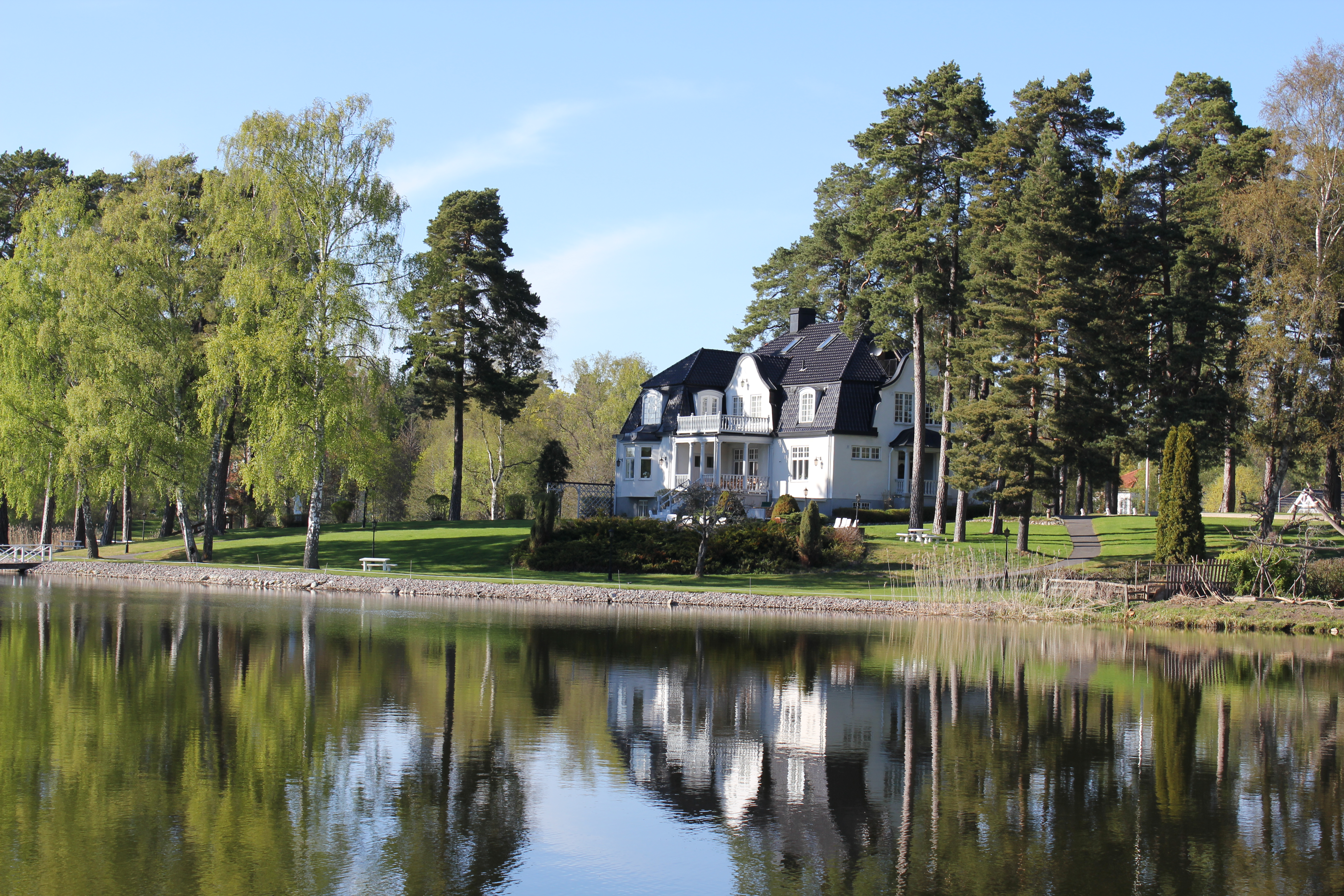

- Location in Stockholm County
- Coordinates: 59°11′30″N 17°48′20″E
- Country: Sweden
- County: Stockholm County
- Municipality: Botkyrka Municipality
- Time zone: UTC+1 (CET)
  - Summer (DST): UTC+2 (CEST)

Uttran is a municipal district and a residential area of southwest Tumba, Botkyrka Municipality, Stockholm County, southeastern Sweden.

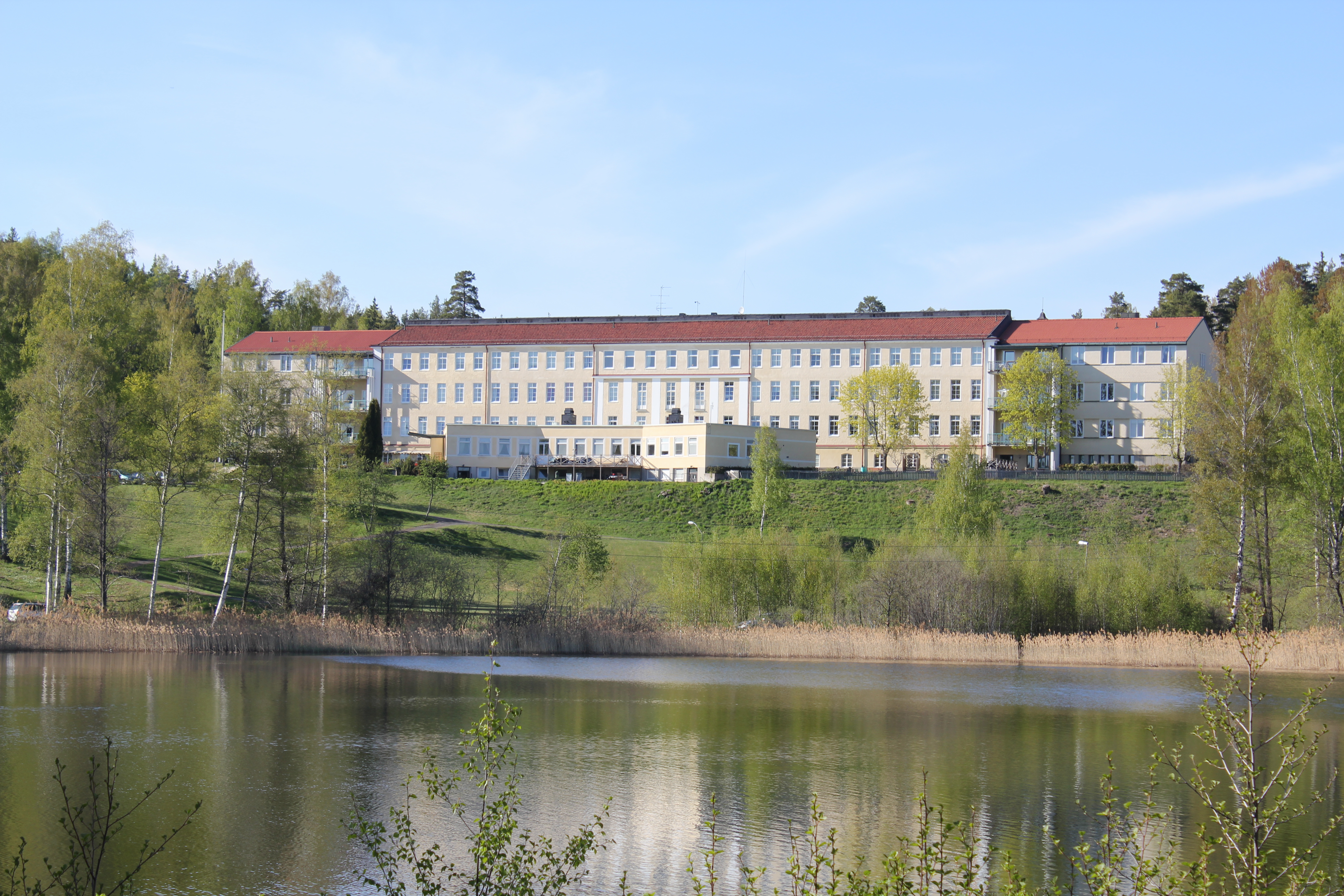
Old hospital
