= Mera Naam Karegi Roshan =

- Genre: Drama
- Directed by: Arvind Babbal
- Starring: Sana Sheikh; Gautam Rode; Amrapali Dubey; Sufi Malhotra; Himani Shivpuri; Sahil Anand
- Opening theme: "Mera Naam Karegi Roshan" by
- Country of origin: India
- Original language: Hindi
- No. of seasons: 1
- No. of episodes: Total 90

Production
- Executive producer: Ravi Sharma
- Producers: Rahil Qaazi & Jamnadas Majethia
- Cinematography: Ravi Naidu
- Editors: Rajesh Pandey & Shashank Singh
- Camera setup: Multi-camera
- Running time: Approx. 24 minutes
- Production companies: Nayel Productions; Hats Off Productions; Artisian And Nirman, Vasai(Tribeni Group Venture)

Original release
- Network: Zee TV
- Release: 12 July – 9 December 2010

Mera Naam Karegi Roshan is an Indian television series that airs on Zee TV, based on the story of a daughter and her crusade against injustice and inequality. It debuted on 12 July 2010, but on 26 November 2010 it was announced that Mera Namm Karegi Roshan was canceled due to lack of ratings. The final episode aired on 9 December 2010. It was shot at Artisian and Nirman studio, Vasai (A Tribeni Group Venture).

== Cast ==
- Sana Sheikh / Amrapali Dubey ... Reet
- Sufi Malhotra ... Yagya (Reet's husband)
- Himani Shivpuri... Yagya's mother
- Sahil Anand ... Bhisham
- Gautam Rode ... Samvad
- Vikram Gokhale ... Thakur Veer Pratap Singh (Reet's father)
- Kaushalya (Reet's mother)
- Yashpal Sharma ... Kunwar Kuldeep Singh (Reet's elder brother)
- Lubna Salim ... Yashoda (Kuldeep's wife)
- Anirudh Dave... Rajveer Singh (Reet's second elder brother)
- Sheetal Dabholkar ... Aishwarya (Rajveer's wife)
- ... Lochan
- Namrata Thapa Currentiya (Lochan's girlfriend)
