= Nanda–Mauryan War =

Overthrow of Nanda Dynasty by Chandragupta Maurya in the late 4th century BCE

Nanda–Mauryan war
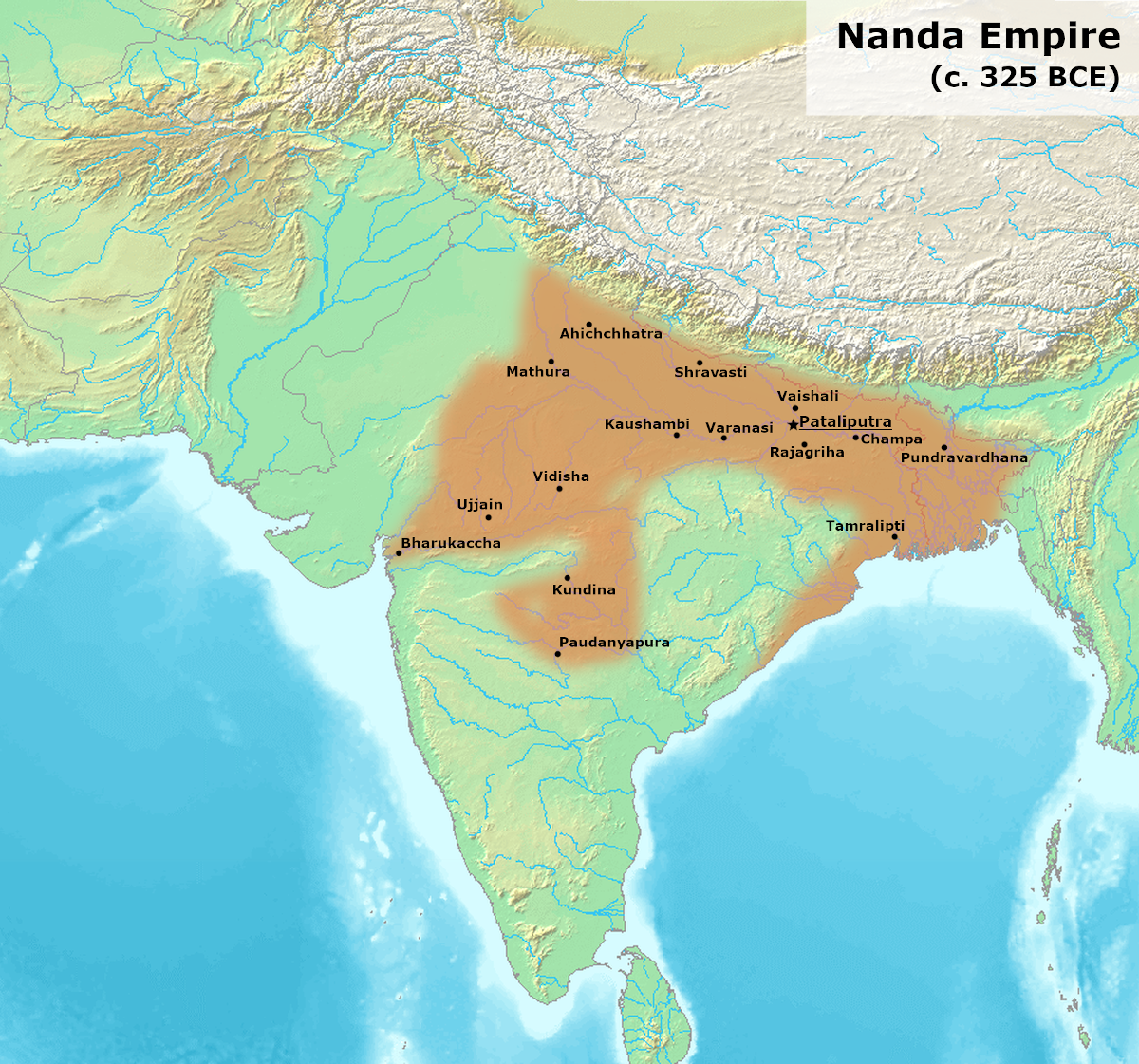
- Extent of the Nanda Empire around the time of the war.
Date	c. 323–321 BCE
Location	Magadha
Result	Mauryan victory: Fall of the Nanda Empire
Territorial changes	Establishment of the Maurya Empire over annexed Nanda territories

Belligerents
Nanda Empire	House of Maurya; Supported by: Matsya Kingdom; Suryavamshi dynasty of Kalinga

Commanders and leaders
Dhana Nanda †; Amatya Rakshas (surrendered); Bhaddasala †	Chandragupta Maurya; Chanakya; Brahmaadittiya

Units involved
Nanda Army	Matsya Army; Kalinga Army; Sakas; Kambojas; Bahlikas; Kiratas; Parasikas; Greeks

Strength
200,000 infantry; 80,000 cavalry; 8,000 chariots; 6,000 war elephants	600,000 infantry; 30,000 cavalry; 8,000 chariots; 9,000 war elephants

Casualties and losses
100,000 soldiers killed; 40,000 cavalry killed; 5,000 charioteers killed; 2000 elephants killed	Unknown

The Nanda–Mauryan War was a war fought in ancient India from c. 323 BCE to 321 BCE between the Emperor Dhana Nanda of the Nanda dynasty and the forces of Chandragupta Maurya that led to the establishment of the Mauryan Empire in Magadha. Little is known from historical sources for certain dating about the conflict. According to Mudrarakshasa legends, Chandragupta's army included Bahlika, Kirata, Parasika, Kamboja, Saka, and Greek mercenaries. The army invaded capital city Pataliputra after regaining power and defeated the Nandas.

== Primary War ==
Much of what is known about the conquest comes from accounts written long after the war itself. Ancient historian Plutarch gives an account of parts of the conquest. The conquest was fictionalized in Mudrarakshasa, a political drama in Sanskrit by Vishakadatta composed between 300 CE and 700 CE. The history is also briefly recounted in Vishnu Purana (unknown date), which emphasizes the importance of Chanakya in the destruction of the Nanda empire. In another work, Milinda Panha (dating from 100 BCE), Bhaddasala is named as a Nanda general during the conquest.

Estimates of the number of soldiers involved are based in part on ancient Roman sources. Plutarch estimates that Chandragupta's army would later number 600,000 by the time it had subdued all of India, an estimate also given by Pliny (23 AD–79 AD). Pliny and Plutarch also estimated the Nanda Army strength in the east as 200,000 infantry, 80,000 cavalry, 8,000 chariots, and 6,000 war elephants. These estimates were based in part of the earlier work of the Seleucid ambassador to the Maurya, Megasthenes. One 21st-century author, Suhas Chatterjee, suggests that "Chandragupta had to engage all his military strength, even Greek mercenaries from Punjab in his conquest of the Nanda king" and according to references about the conquest in the Milinda Panha "100,000 of soldiers, 10,000 elephants, 100,000 horses and 5,000 charioteers were killed in the encounter".

== Reign of Chandragupta Maurya ==
In Mudrarakshasa, Chandragupta was said to have first acquired Punjab, and then combined forces with Chanakya and advanced upon the Nanda Empire. Similarly, Plutarch writes that he first overthrew Alexander's prefects in the northwest of India.

P. K. Bhattacharyya concludes that the war would have consisted of gradual conquest of provinces after the initial consolidation of Magadha.

In Mudrarakshasa, he laid siege to Kusumapura (or Pataliputra, now Patna), the capital of Magadha, with the help of north-west frontier tribe mercenaries from areas already conquered. The siege may have begun in 320 BCE. By 312 BCE he had conquered all of north and north-west India.

In the war, Chandragupta may have allied with the Matsya king and the Suryavamshi king of Kalinga (modern-day Odisha). The prior experience of his mercenaries from the Punjab were likely important in his military success.

It is also suggested that Chandragupta's campaign was laid out by using popular guerrilla tactics, as the Nanda Empire was large and had been able to wield large armies that would have been overwhelming to oppose by an upstart.

== Siege of Patliputra (c. 322 BCE) ==
Siege of Pataliputra
Date	322 BCE
Location	Pataliputra, Nanda Empire
Result	Mauryan Victory
Territorial changes	Pataliputra captured by Chandragupta Maurya

Belligerents
Nanda Empire	Maurya Empire

Commanders and leaders
Dhana Nanda †; Amatya Rakshas (surrendered)	Chandragupta Maurya; Chanakya

Chanakya and Chandragupta Maurya stationed garrisons in rashtras (nations) and janapadas. In 322 BC, they march to Magadha, besieged the capital Pataliputra and captured it. They forced the Nandas to surrender. Dhana Nanda, the last Nanda emperor was killed in action during the siege. The war brought an end to the Nanda dynasty and established the Maurya Empire with Chandragupta Maurya as its emperor.

== Aftermath ==
Maurya Empire consisted of at least 3 provinces at the end of Chandragupta's conquests: Avantirastra (capital: Ujjayini), Uttarapatha (capital: Taksasila), and Purvapatha (capital: Pataliputra). Chanakya later became Chandragupta's prime minister.

Chandragupta eventually expanded his empire to southern India and warred with the Seleucid Empire over control over all of north western India and parts of Persia.

The Maurya Empire eventually became the most extensive empire in India with area of 5,000,000 km^{2}.

== See also ==
- Magadha
- Chanakya
- Nanda Empire
- Maurya Empire
- List of wars involving India
- List of monarchs of Magadha
