= Saam Daam Dand Bheda =

Principle of strategy

Saam Daam Dand Bheda (Sanskrit: साम दाम दंड भेद) is an Indian doctrine in the field of strategy and achieving the goal. It is often attributed to the ancient Indian diplomat Acharya Chanakya. The principle of Saam Daam Dand Bheda was rooted in the text Bhagavad Gita. It is described by Lord Krishna to the Pandavas hero warrior Arjuna in the text. The principle is used in several fields like strategy, statecraft, politics, management, diplomacy and wars, etc. The phrase of Saam Daam Dand Bheda is often uttered by leaders, managers and supervisors, etc for achieving the prescribed goal by them.

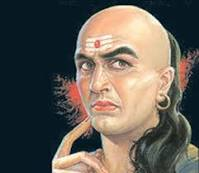
A portrait of the great Indian diplomat Acharya Chanakya also known as Kautilya, who coined the phrase "Saam Daam Dand Bheda" in his text Arthashastra.

The Indian classical text Chanakya Neeti includes the concept of Saam Daam Dand Bheda as a success mantra (tool) for achieving a goal.

== Etymology ==
The concept of Saam Daam Dand Bheda is a four-folds way of success to achieve the goal. The phrase contains four Indic terms Saam, Daam, Dand and Bheda. The Indic term saam stands for dealing people with good and sweet manners. It is the first technique for success in achieving the goal. The second term daam stands for money. It is applied when the first technique does not work. In the second technique, money or bribe is used to get one's work done. Similarly the third term dand stands for punishment and the fourth term bheda stands for creating division among people for achieving success in the goal.

== Description ==
In the text Arthashastra of Kautilya, there are some verses regarding the principle of the Saam Daam Dand Bheda as

अतुष्टान्सामदानभेददण्डै: साधयेत्‌ ।।

— Acharya Chanakya, Verse 25, Chapter 13, Vinayadhikaarika section, Arthashastra

The verse translates to "Those who are not satisfied should be satisfied by the means of saam daam dand bheda." And similarly other verse in the text is

लभेत सामदानाभ्यां कृत्यांश्च परभूमिषु । अकृत्यान्भेददण्डाभ्यां परदोपांश्च दर्शयेत् ॥

— Arthashastra

The shloka translates to "Those who—out of dissatisfaction—have gone to the enemy's country or land should be brought back under control through Saam (persuasion) or Daan (offering wealth). A king desirous of victory should bring under his control those who have not yet succumbed to the enemy but have turned hostile, by using threats or punishment, and by having spies expose the flaws of the rival king."

The essence of the principle is also rooted in the Hindu Puranas text Shrimad Bhagvatam. In the text, it is mentioned as catuṣṭayam. It was taught to Prahlada, so that he would be mastered in diplomatic affairs to become a king after his father Hiranyakashypa. It is mentioned in the shloka 19 of the 5th chapter in the 7th Skandha of the text. The Shloka is as

तत एनं गुरुर्ज्ञात्वा ज्ञातज्ञेयचतुष्टयम् । दैत्येन्द्रं दर्शयामास मातृमृष्टमलङ्‌कृतम् ॥

— Shloka 19, Chapter 5, Khanda 7, Shrimad Bhagvatam

Similarly in the Sanskrit text Hitopadesha, the principle is described as a four ways solution to achieve success. The verse regarding this solution is as

सामदानभेददण्डा-श्चत्वार उपायाः ।

— Katha 3, Katha Sangrah 3, Sandhi, Hitopadesha

The verse translates to "saam, daan, bheda and dand are the four ways." The other verse describing the four ways is as

यद्यप्युपायाश्चत्वारो निर्दिष्टाः साध्यसाधने । संख्यामात्रं फलं तेषां सिद्धिः साच्नि व्यवस्थिता ।।

— Verse 98, Katha 13, Kartha Sangraha 3, Sandhi, Hitopadesha

The above verse translates to "Because - although there are four ways (Saam, Daam, Dand and Bhed) to fulfill the desire, yet the result of those ways is only counted but the means of the work remains in the union. That is, the work gets done by the union."

== Context of war and conflict ==
In the context of war and conflict, the principle of Saam Daam Dand Bheda can serve as a guide for any ruler or leader. The classical Indian strategist Acharya Chanakya believes that a war or conflict could be won not only by physical strength, but also by intelligence, planning and the right strategy. He suggests that the four methods of the principle can be adopted in warfare. The four methods or steps are saam, daam, dand and bheda. These four methods should be used at the right time and in a proper way. Here the first step "Saam" means peaceful persuasion, "Daam" means coveting money, "Dand" means punishment and "Bheda" means dividing the enemy. These four steps are the advisory for the ruler or the leader to get victory in the war or the conflict.

The first technique saam of the principle, is the most important method, in the strategy of warfare affairs, since it involves minimum loss or damage. In this technique, the matter of conflict is resolved through peaceful discussions or treaties. The term saam literally means stuti (praise) or prayer but it also has another meaning called cleverness. It is the tactics of cleverness to resolve the conflict in very peaceful manner.

== Management ==
In the modern times, it is used to achieve targets and goals of the corporate sectors. The leaders or managers of the corporate sectors use the principle of the Saam Daam Dand Bheda in the strategy of their management to achieve the prescribed goals of these organisations.
