= Devichandraguptam =

Indian political drama

Devi-Chandraguptam (IAST: Devīcandraguptam) or Devi-Chandragupta is an Indian Sanskrit-language political drama attributed to Vishakhadeva, who is generally identified with Vishakhadatta. The complete text of the play is now lost, but its portions survive in form of quotations in the later works. The plot also survives in form of a Persian language story, which appears to be an adaptation of the play, and is included in the 11th century text Majmal-ut-Tawarikh.

In the play, king Ramagupta decides to surrender his queen Dhruvadevi ("Devi") to a Shaka enemy when besieged. Ramagupta's younger brother Chandragupta enters the enemy camp disguised as the queen, and kills the enemy ruler. The rest of the story is not clear from the surviving passages, but based on other historical evidence, it appears that in the last part of the play, Chandragupta dethrones Ramagupta and marries Dhruvadevi.

The historicity of the play's narrative is disputed: some modern historians theorize that it is based on historical events, as several later sources refer to the events mentioned in the play. Other scholars argue that there these later sources may be based on the play itself, and no independent evidence corroborates its historicity.

== Authorship ==
The play is attributed to Vishakhadeva, whom modern scholars generally identify with Vishakhadatta, the author of the Sanskrit play Mudra-rakshasa. His period is not certain but he probably flourished in or after the 6th century CE. Some scholars such as A. S. Altekar, K. P. Jayaswal and Sten Konow theorized that Vishakhadatta was a contemporary of Chandragupta II, and lived in the late 4th century to the early 5th century. But this view has been challenged by other scholars, including Moriz Winternitz and R. C. Majumdar.

== Plot ==
Based on the surviving fragments, the play appears to have opened in the Gupta military camp. King Ramagupta has been defeated by an unnamed Shaka ruler, and his camp has been besieged by the enemy. The enemy has offered him peace if he surrenders his queen Dhruvadevi, and Ramagupta has reluctantly agreed to these terms after pressure from his ministers.

In Act I, Ramagupta's younger brother Chandragupta tries to find an alternative to these dishonourable terms. He thinks of raising a vetala (a mythical vampire-like creature), presumably to magically use it against the enemy. While he discusses this topic with the jester (vidushaka) Atreya, a maid arrives with the queen's robe. The maid is taking the robe to Madhavasena, a courtesan and a common friend of Chandragupta and the queen (presumably as a parting gift from the queen, before she is sent to the enemy camp). The maid asks Chandragupta where Madhavasena is, and goes away to find her. Chandragupta gets the idea of going to the enemy camp disguised as the queen, and killing the Shaka ruler. He goes off the stage to disguise himself as a woman. Later, as Chandragupta is about to depart for the enemy camp, Atreya is concerned about him going alone among the enemies. Chandragupta declares that a single lion forces many deer to run away: a hero doesn't care about being outnumbered.

In Act II, Ramagupta tries to dissuade Chandragupta from going to the enemy camp, stating that he would rather lose the queen than his brother. The king says, "Abide by my words, I dare not abandon you for my love for you is too strong. I have decided to give away the queen like a straw." The queen, who overhears the conversation from a distance, thinks that her husband is talking to another woman, and misunderstands the conversation to believe that her husband is abandoning her for another woman. She becomes angry with the king, which apparently forebodes evil for the king, although the exact sequel is not clear from the surviving fragments.

In Act III, it is reported that Chandragupta has killed the Shaka king. In either Act III or Act IV (not clear from the surviving extracts), he observes Dhruvadevi's feelings: she no longer loves the king Ramagupta, and is "full of shame, anger, despair, fear and discontent".

In Act IV, Chandragupta and Madhavasena share an intimate moment. He tells her that his heart is already "bound by her qualities", and asks her to bind him "with her arms, necklace and girdle". Perhaps, in the preceding scene (which is not part of the surviving fragments), she warns him that he is in danger of being literally bound, presumably as a result of a plot against him or on the orders of his brother Ramagupta.

In Act V, the last act from which any quotations survive, Chandragupta is in some kind of danger. To protect himself, he feigns madness on his way to the court (apparently that of king Ramagupta). He tries to conceal the development of his love for someone (not clear who), and is slightly afraid of his rival (again, not clear who). This scene is accompanied by two Prakrit-language songs in the Arya metre. The first song describes the moonrise, portraying Chandragupta as the moon ("Chandra" in Sanskrit) who has destroyed the darkness.

It is not clear from the surviving fragments who Chandragupta's rival in the last act is. But modern scholars theorize that the rival is his brother Ramagupta, and the person he tries to conceal his love for is Dhruva-devi. The rest of the plot may be reconstructed as follows: Ramagupta's public image suffers as a result of his decision to surrender his wife to an enemy, while Chandragupta is regarded as a hero by the subjects. Ramagupta grows jealous of his brother, and tries to persecute him. Chandragupta feigns madness to escape his brother's enmity, but ultimately kills him, becomes the new king, and marries Dhruva-devi (see Historicity below).

== Fragments ==
The original text of the play is now lost, but its extracts survive as quotations in the later works. Thirteen passages from the play have been quoted in four different works on dramaturgy. Some sources also refer to it without quoting passages from it.

=== Natya-darpana ===
Six quotations from the play can be found in Natya-darpana, a work on dramaturgy authored by the Jain scholars Ramachandra and Gunachandra:

- The first quotation features Ramagupta talking to his younger brother Chandragupta. Chandragupta is ready to go to the enemy camp disguised as the queen Dhruva-svamini, who overhears this conversation, but misunderstands it to interpret that Ramagupta is in love with another woman and is ready to abandon her.
- The second quotation, taken from the Act IV of the play, mentions Chandragupta's love affair with a courtesan called Madhavasena.
- The third quotation describes the plight of the queen Dhruvadevi (alias Dhruva-samini), when she becomes aware that her husband has decided to surrender her to the enemy.
- The fourth quotation is a single verse in which Chandragputa flirts with Madhavasena using vulgar language. The authors of Natya-darpana state that such vulgar language is allowed when the heroine is a courtesan.
- The fifth quotation, taken from the Act II, repeats some content from the first quotation. It describes that Ramagupta had agreed to surrender his queen to the Shaka king. Chandragupta wants to go to the enemy camp disguised as the queen, and kill the enemy. However, Ramagupta tells Chandragupta, "Abide by my words, I dare not abandon you for my love for you is too strong. I have decided to give away the queen like a straw." Dhruvadevi overhears this conversation, and thinks that Ramagupta is addressing another woman.
- The sixth quotation, taken from Act V, describes the moon ("Chandra") entering the mansion of the sky after having destroyed the darkness (that is, Chandragupta's entering the palace after having destroyed his enemies). Chandragupta, who was feigning insanity, trying to conceal his love-sickness, and slightly fearful of the enemy, exits the stage to proceed to the palace.

=== Bhoja's works ===
Three passages from the play appear in Bhoja's Shringara-Prakasha and Sarasvati-kanthabharana.

- The first passage, from Shringara-Prakasha, mentions that Chandragupta, disguised as a woman, went to the enemy camp in Alipura, to kill the Shakapati (the Shaka lord).
- In the second passage, also from Shringara-Prakasha, the clown (vidushaka) tries to dissuade Chandragupta from going to the enemy camp, as he would be alone. Chandragputa dismisses his concern, declaring that for a brave man, being outnumbered doesn't matter.
- The third passage, same as the fourth quotation featured in the Natya-darpana, describes Chandragupta flirting with a lady. However, the lady's name is Vasanta-sena instead of Madhava-sena.

== Majmal-ut-Tawarikh adaptation ==
Abul Hasan Ali's Majmal-ut-Tawarikh (1026 CE / 417 AH) is the Persian language translation of an Arabic language book. The Arabic work itself is a translation of an unspecified Sanskrit ("Hindwani") work. The text includes a story which appears to be based on the plot of Devichandraguptam. The story is about two royal brothers, Rawwal and Barkamaris: Rawwal succeeds their father as the king, and takes a princess who is attracted to Barkarmaris. When an enemy king besieges Rawwal's fort and demands him to surrender the princess, Barkarmis and his soldiers enter the enemy camp disguised as women, and kill the enemy king and nobles. Rawwal's wazir Safar instigates him against Barkamaris, forcing Barkamaris to feign insanity and become a mendicant. Later, Barkarmis kills Rawwal, takes back the princess, and becomes the king. The character Rawwal seems to be based on Ramagupta, and Barkamaris seems to be based on Chandragupta II alias Vikramaditya.

=== Plot ===
After the death of king Ayand, his son Rasal succeeded him on the throne. Sometime later, a rebel usurped the throne, and expelled Rasal from the kingdom. Rasal migrated southwards, and established his authority there. He had two sons: Rawwal, who became the king after his death, and Barkamaris, who was very handsome and wise.

A princess, who was famous for intelligence, was sought by all the Hindu kings and princes, but she was attracted only to Barkamaris. When Barkamaris brought her home, Rawwal took her and her handmaids instead. Barkamaris believed that the princess had chosen him for his wisdom, and therefore, decided that there was nothing better than pursuing wisdom. Over time, he became exceptionally wise by devoting himself to studies and interacting with the learned people.

Meanwhile, the rebel who had expelled Rasal heard about the princess, and invaded Rawwal's territory. Rawwal fled to a strong hill fortress, accompanied by his brothers and nobles, but the enemy besieged the fort. Facing a certain defeat, Rawwal decided to negotiate a peace treaty. The enemy demanded the princess as well as one girl from each of Rawwal's chiefs, stating that he would give these girls to his own officers. Rawwal's blind wazir (chief advisor) Safar advised him to surrender the women, and live to fight the enemy another day. Rawwal agreed to the suggestion, but then Barkamaris arrived, and requested to be allowed to propose an alternative.

After being informed of all the facts, Barkarmis proposed that he and sons of Rawwal's chiefs enter the enemy camp disguised as women. Each youth would carry a concealed knife and trumpet. When the enemy king retires with Barkamaris (disguised as the princess), Barkamaris would kill him and sound the trumpet: on hearing this, the other youths would similarly kill the enemy chiefs, and blow their trumpets. On hearing these trumpets, Rawwal would attack the rival camp with his army, and exterminate the enemy forces.

Rawwal agreed to the proposal, and the enemy was decisively defeated. As a result of this victory, Rawwal's power greatly increased. However, subsequently, the wazir Safar aroused the king's suspicions against Barkamaris, who feigned madness to escape the king's wrath.

One hot day, Barkamaris — now disguised as a mendicant — came to the gate of Rawwal's palace, while wandering in the city. The palace was unguarded that day, and Barkamaris managed to enter it unopposed. He found Rawwal and the princess sitting on a throne, and sucking a sugarcane. Rawwal offered a sugarcane to the mendicant, who took it and started scraping it with a shell of the cane. When Rawwal saw this, he asked the princess to give the mendicant a knife to scrape the sugarcane. Barkarmis took the knife, and killed Rawwal with it, dragging the king off the throne.

Barkarmis then called the wazir and other people, and seated himself on the throne, applauded by the people. He burnt Rawwal's body, and took back the princess. He asked the wazir to continue to govern the kingdom on his behalf, as the wazir did on Rawwal's behalf. However, the wazir declared that he was loyal to Rawwal, and decided to commit suicide by burning himself.

Barkamaris asked the wazir to write a book on governance: the wazir agreed to this request, and wrote Adabu-l Muluk ("Instruction of Kings"), which was admired by all the nobles. The wazir then committed suicide, and Barkarmis expanded his power to gain control of entire India.

== Historicity ==
The official records of the Gupta dynasty mention Chandragupta II, but not Ramagupta. Dhruvadevi's historicity is attested by her royal seal which describes her as the wife of Chandragupta and the mother of Govindagupta.

Several modern historians believe that the play is based on true historical events. According to this theory, Ramagupta agreed to surrender his queen Dhruvadevi to the Shaka king, alienating her as well as his subjects. However, Chandragupta heroically defeated the enemy, winning the admiration of the queen and the subjects. Chandragupta ultimately de-throned his brother, and married Dhruvadevi. Historian Romila Thapar theorizes that the play may have been written in the Gupta court, possibly during the reign of Chandragupta's successors. The author's intention may have been to justify Chandragupta's unorthodox act of killing his elder brother and marrying his predecessor's wife.

The play's historicity is supported by the following evidence:

- Three Jain stone statues discovered at Durjanpur near Vidisha bear inscriptions that mention Maharajadhiraja Ramagupta. Maharajadhiraja is an imperial title, and the inscriptions are in the Gupta Brahmi script of 4th-5th centuries CE, which proves that Ramagupta was a historical Gupta emperor.
- Bana's Harshacharita (7th century) states that "Chandra-gupta, disguised in a woman's dress, murdered the Shaka chief who coveted another's wife". Bana mentions this incident while quoting examples from historical episodes.
- Shankararya (c. 14th century), who wrote a commentary on Bana's work, elaborates that the Shaka chief coveted Dhruvadevi, the wife of Chandragupta's brother: Chandragupta disguised himself as Dhruvadevi, and accompanied by soldiers disguised as women, killed the Shaka chief secretly.
- The 871 CE Sanjan copper-plate inscription of the Rashtrakuta ruler Amoghavarsha I contrasts him with the Gupta king, who despite his reputation for charity, killed his brother, and took away his brother's kingdom and wife. The inscription states that this Gupta king was a "despised donor", and falsely portrayed the gift of 100,000 as a gift of 1,000,000 in his documents (possibly a reference to Chandragupta's Mathura's inscription, which portrays him as the donor of 1,000,000 cows). It states that the glory of this Gupta king was "ashamed" before the glory of Amoghavarsha.
- The 930 CE Khambhat inscription and the 933 CE Sangli inscriptions of the Rashtrakuta ruler Govinda IV state that he became Sahasanka ("valourous", an epithet of Chandragupta II) without being cruel towards his elder brother and without committing the evil deed of having intercourse with his elder brother's wife.
- A doubtful reference occurs in Rajashekhara's Kavya-mimamsa (c. 10th century), which states that king Sharmagupta (or Senagupta) gave his wife Dhruvasvamini to a Khasa chief when besieged in the caves and forests of the Himalayas. While "Dhruvasvamini" can be explained as a variant of "Dhruvadevi", the name of her husband and his enemy are different in this text.
- The Persian text Majmal-ut Tawarikh appears to be based on Devichandraguptam (see above).
- In the official Gupta genealogy, the kings are described as "meditating on the feet" of their fathers. However, in a departure from this convention, Chandragupta II is described as having been "accepted by his father" in his Mathura stone pillar inscription as well as Bihar and Bhitari inscriptions of Skandagupta. Scholars who believe the play to have a historical basis argue that this is a covert way of stating that his accession to the throne was contested.
- Chakrapani Datta's commentary on Charaka Samhita refers to Chandragputa's murder of his brother.

A few copper coins, bearing the legend "Ramaguta" (Prakrit form of "Ramagupta") have been found at Eran and Vidisha in Madhya Pradesh. Some scholars, such as K. D. Bajpai, have attributed these coins to the Gupta ruler Ramagupta. For example, Bajpai theorized that Samudragupta appointed his son Ramagupta as a governor in central India; Ramagupta was forced to stay there even after his father's death because of the war with the Shakas, and the events depicted in Devichandraguptam happened there. However, other scholars, such as historian D. C. Sircar, have disputed the attribution of these coins to an imperial Gupta ruler. Sircar theorizes that the issuer of these coins was a local chief who imitated Gupta coinage; other chiefs with names ending in -gupta (such as Harigupta and Indragupta) are known to have issued similar coinage.

Arguments doubting the play's historicity include the following:

- Devichandraguptam is a play composed three or four centuries after the events described in it supposedly happened, and therefore, cannot be regarded as an authentic source of history.
- The later sources that allude to the events described in Devichandraguptam may be based on the play itself, and thus, cannot be conclusively regarded as evidence corroborating the play's historicity. Even if we assume that Vishakhadatta lived in as late as the 7th century CE, Bana's Harsha-charita would remain the only known independent source that alludes to Chandragupta's killing of the Shaka chief. However, Bana doesn't mention Ramagupta or Dhruva-devi at all.
- The events described in the play are "highly incredible" (in words of historian R. C. Majumdar). It is highly unlikely that the successor of a powerful king like Samudragupta was reduced to such dire situation that he was forced to surrender his wife to a Shaka king. It is also hard to believe that the Gupta ministers agreed to such dishonourable terms. Chandragupta's act of marrying the widow of his deceased brother is also not in accordance with the acceptable practices of the contemporary society.

According to historian R. C. Majumdar, the existence of emperor Ramagupta is proved by the inscriptions that mention him, but this does not necessarily confirm the historicity of the events described in Devichandraguptam.

Numismatist Sanjeev Kumar identifies Ramagupta with King based on a copper coin discovered in the Vidisha area. The obverse of this coin shows an Ashvamedha horse with the Brahmi text "Kācha", and the reverse reads "Rāmagupta Ma[harāja]". Kumar theorizes that the Ramagupta served as the governor of Vidisha and issued copper coins during the reign of his father Samudragupta. After the death of his father around 378 CE, he conducted an Ashvamedha ceremony, and declared himself the king assuming the regnal name Kācha. His younger brother Chandragupta II later killed him, and the play Devichandragupta was written as propaganda aimed at covering up this assassination.
