= Chanakya =

Semi-legendary adviser of Chandragupta Maurya

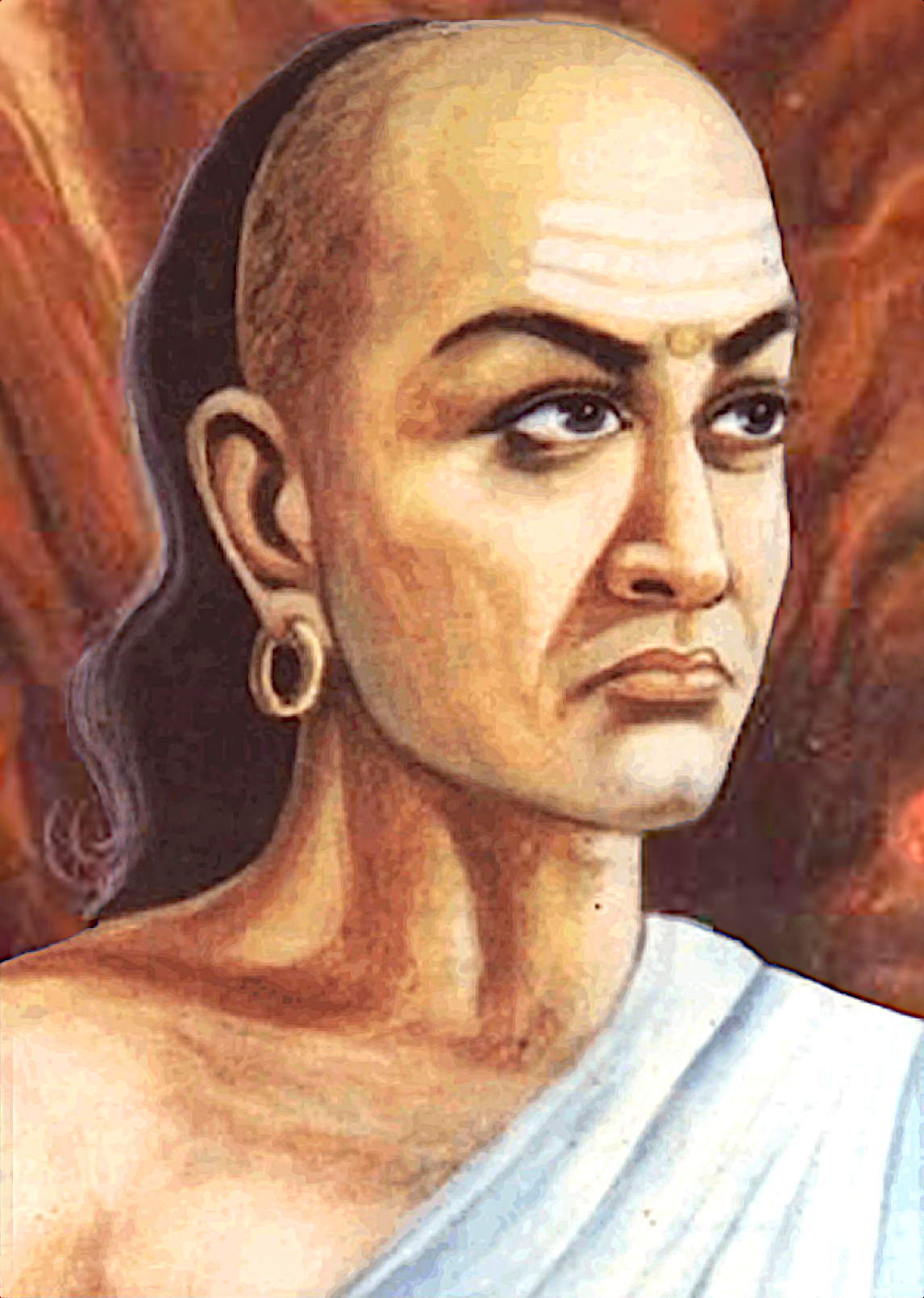
- Chanakya as depicted on the cover of R. Shamasastry's 1915 translation of Arthashastra
- Born: Chanaka village in Golla region, South India (Jain legends); or in Takshashila (Buddhist legends)
- Died: Pataliputra, Maurya Empire
- Occupations: Political advisor, prime minister
- Era: 4th century BC–3rd century BCE
- Known for: Prominent role in the foundation of the Maurya Empire
- Father: Chanaka (per Jain legend)

Chanakya (ISO: Cāṇakya, चाणक्य,), according to legendary narratives (Note: Semi-legendary: Trautmann (1971, p. 9): "the legend of Chanakya"; Trautmann (1971, p. 10): "To say that the Arthasastra is ascribed to an historical character is to strain the term ‘historical'. Rather, Kautilya, or Canakya as he is more generally called, is a figure of legends which assign him an historical role; the historicity of the person, and much more so of his role, is a matter of some doubt."; Trautmann (1971, p. 67): "sufficient grounds to believe that Canakya is as historical a figure as Nanda or Candragupta. ... although as hero of the story his role vis-a-vis Candragupta is no doubt exaggerated, it must have been a prominent one to have become current in folk literature. To doubt Canakya’s existence places a greater strain on the imagination: some other origin for the stories of him would have to be found.') preserved in various traditions dating from the 4th to 11th century CE, was a Brahmin who assisted the first Mauryan emperor Chandragupta in his rise to power and the establishment of the Maurya Empire. According to these narratives, Chanakya served as the chief adviser and prime minister to both emperors Chandragupta Maurya and his son Bindusara.

Conventionally, Chanakya was identified with Kauṭilya and synonymously Vishnugupta, the author of the ancient Indian politico-economic treatise Arthashastra. Arthashastra is now thought with high probability to have been composed by multiple authors during the early centuries of the common era—several centuries after the Mauryan period—the backdated identification with Chanakya to have served to add prestige to the work. (Note: See Arthashastra, note on dating and authorship].)

== Chanakya-Chandragupta katha (legend) ==
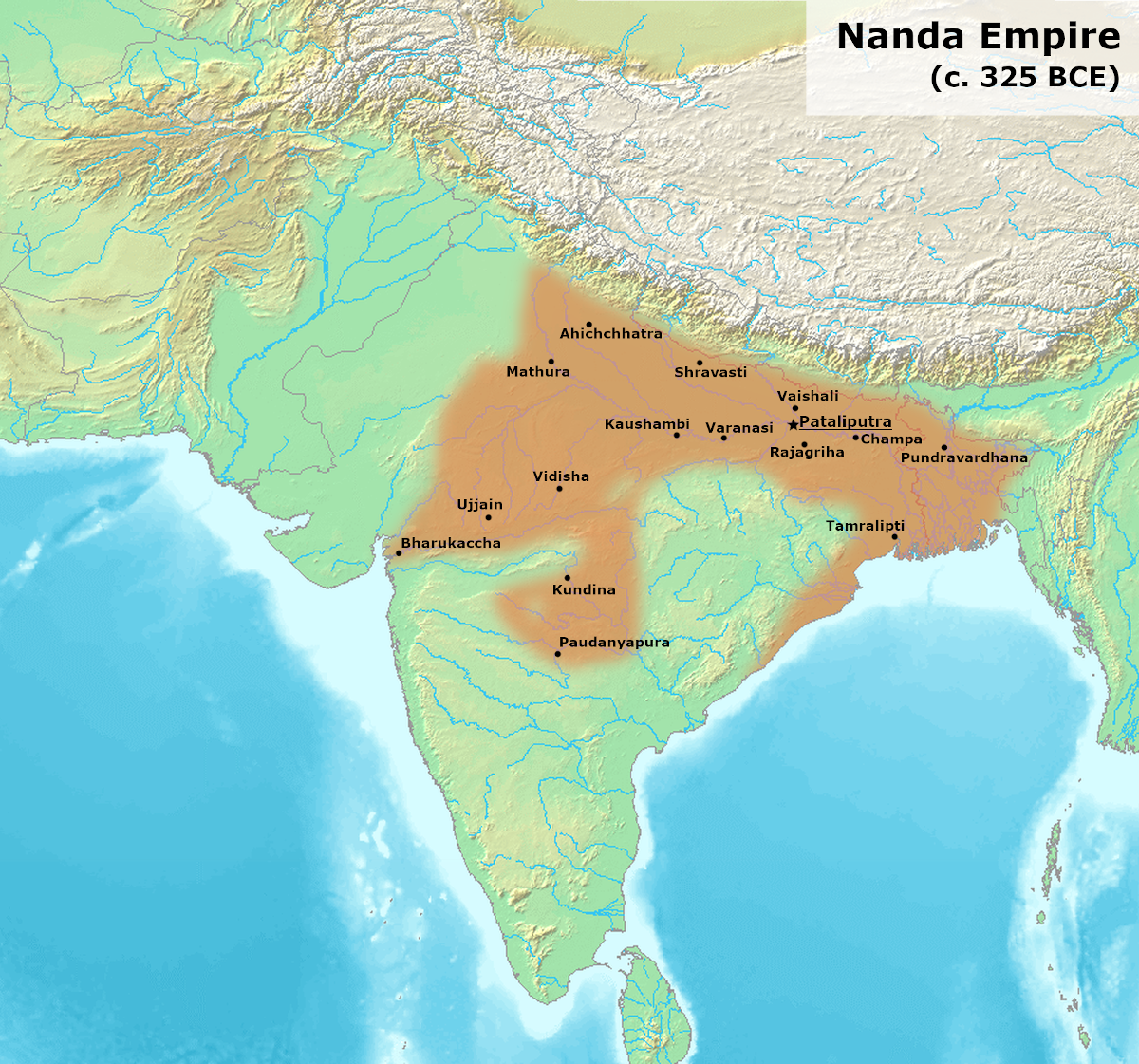
Dhana Nanda's empire, c. 323 BCE

There is no documented historical information about Chanakya: narratives about him come from legendary accounts. Thomas Trautmann identifies four distinct accounts of the ancient Chanakya-Chandragupta katha (legend):

- Buddhist version: Mahavamsa (5th-6th cent. CE) and its commentary Vamsatthappakasini (Pali language)
- Jain version: Parishishtaparvan (12th cent. CE) by Hemachandra, based on 1st-8th century sources
- Kashmiri version: Kathasaritsagara (11th cent. CE) by Somadeva, Brihat-Katha-Manjari by Ksemendra
- Vishakhadatta's version: Mudrarakshasa (4th-8th cent. CE), a Sanskrit play by Vishakhadatta; largely fictional

In all the four versions, Chanakya feels insulted by the Nanda king, and vows to destroy him. After dethroning the Nanda, he installs Chandragupta as the new king.

=== Buddhist version (5th-6th cent. CE) ===
==== Source ====
The legend of Chanakya and Chandragupta is detailed in the Pali-language Buddhist chronicles of Sri Lanka. It is not mentioned in Dipavamsa, the oldest of these chronicles. The earliest Buddhist source to mention the legend is Mahavamsa, which is generally dated between fifth and sixth centuries CE. Vamsatthappakasini (also known as Mahvamsa Tika), a commentary on Mahavamsa, provides some more details about the legend. Its author is unknown, and it is dated variously from sixth century CE to 13th century CE. Some other texts provide additional details about the legend; for example, the Maha-Bodhi-Vamsa and the Atthakatha give the names of the nine Nanda kings said to have preceded Chandragupta.

==== Narrative ====
According to the Buddhist legend, the Nanda emperors who preceded Chandragupta were robbers-turned-rulers. Chanakya (IAST: Cāṇakka in Mahavamsa) was a Brahmin from Takkāsila (Takshashila). He was well-versed in three Vedas and politics. He was born with canine teeth, which were believed to be a mark of royalty. His mother feared that he would neglect her after becoming an emperor. To pacify her, Chanakya broke his teeth.

Chanakya had an ugly appearance, accentuated by his broken teeth and crooked feet. One day, the Emperor Dhana Nanda organised an alms-giving ceremony for Brahmins. Chanakya went to Pupphapura (Pushpapura) to attend this ceremony. Disgusted by his appearance, the emperor ordered him to be thrown out of the assembly. Chanakya broke his sacred thread in anger, and cursed the emperor. The emperor ordered his arrest, but Chanakya escaped in the disguise of an Ājīvika. He befriended Dhananada's son Pabbata, and instigated him to seize the throne. With help of a signet ring given by the prince, Chanakya fled the palace through a secret door.

Chanakya escaped to the Vinjha forest. There, he made 800 million gold coins (kahapanas), using a secret technique that allowed him to turn 1 coin into 8 coins. After hiding this money, he started searching for a person worthy of replacing Dhana Nanda. One day, he saw a group of children playing: the young Chandragupta (called Chandagutta in Mahavamsa) played the role of an emperor, while other boys pretended to be vassals, ministers, or robbers. The "robbers" were brought before Chandragupta, who ordered their limbs to be cut off, but then miraculously re-attached them. Chandragupta had been born in a royal family, but was brought up by a hunter after his father was killed by an usurper, and the devatas caused his mother to abandon him. Astonished by the boy's miraculous powers, Chanakya paid 1000 gold coins to his foster-father, and took Chandragupta away, promising to teach him a trade.

Chanakya had two potential successors to Dhana Nanda: Pabbata and Chandragupta. He gave each of them an amulet to be worn around the neck with a woolen thread. One day, he decided to test them. While Chandragupta was asleep, he asked Pabbata to remove Chandragupta's woolen thread without breaking it and without waking up Chandragupta. Pabbata failed to accomplish this task. Some time later, when Pabbata was sleeping, Chanakya challenged Chandragupta to complete the same task. Chandragupta retrieved the woolen thread by cutting off Pabbata's head. For the next seven years, Chanakya trained Chandragupta for imperial duties. When Chandragupta became an adult, Chanakya dug up his hidden treasure of gold coins, and assembled an army.

The army of Chanadragupta and Chanakya invaded Dhana Nanda's empire, but disbanded after facing a severe defeat. While wandering in disguise, the two men once listened to the conversation between a woman and her son. The child had eaten the middle of a cake, and thrown away the edges. The woman scolded him, saying that he was eating food like Chandragupta, who attacked the central part of the empire instead of conquering the border villages first. Chanakya and Chandragupta realised their mistake. They assembled a new army, and started conquering the border villages. Gradually, they advanced to the empire's capital Pataliputra (Pāṭaliputta in Mahavamsa), where they killed the Emperor Dhana Nanda. Chanakya ordered a fisherman to find the place where Dhana Nanda had hidden his treasure. As soon as the fishermen informed Chanakya about its location, Chanakya had him killed. Chanakya anointed Chandragupta as the new emperor, and tasked a man named Paṇiyatappa with eliminating rebels and robbers from the empire.

Chanakya started mixing small doses of poison in the new emperor's food to make him immune to poisoning attempts by the enemies. Chandragupta, who was not aware of this, once shared the food with his pregnant empress Durdhara, who was seven days away from delivery. Chanakya arrived just as the empress ate the poisoned morsel. Realising that she was going to die, Chanakya decided to save the unborn child. He cut off the empress's head and cut open her belly with a sword to take out the foetus. Over the next seven days, he placed the foetus in the belly of a goat freshly killed each day. After seven days, Chandragupta's son was "born". He was named Bindusara because his body was spotted with drops (bindu) of goat's blood.

The earliest Buddhist legends do not mention Chanakya in their description of the Mauryan dynasty after this point. Dhammapala's commentary on Theragatha, however, mentions a legend about Chanakya and a Brahmin named Subandhu. According to this account, Chanakya was afraid that the wise Subandhu would surpass him at Chandragupta's court. So, he got Chandragupta to imprison Subandhu, whose son Tekicchakani escaped and became a Buddhist monk. The 16th-century Tibetan Buddhist author Taranatha mentions Chanakya as one of Bindusara's "great lords". According to him, Chanakya destroyed the nobles and kings of 16 towns and made Bindusara the master of all the territory between the eastern and the western seas (Arabian Sea and the Bay of Bengal).

=== Jain version (12th cent. CE, based on 1st-8th cent. CE sources) ===
==== Source ====
The Chandragupta-Chanakya legend is mentioned in several commentaries of the Shvetambara canon. The most well-known version of the Jain legend is contained in the Sthaviravali-Charita or Parishishta-Parvan, written by the 12th-century writer Hemachandra. Hemachandra's account is based on the Prakrit kathanaka literature (legends and anecdotes) composed between the late first century CE and mid-8th century CE. These legends are contained in the commentaries (churnis and tikas) on canonical texts such as Uttaradhyayana and Avashyaka Niryukti.

Thomas Trautmann believes that the Jain version is older and more consistent than the Buddhist version of the legend.

==== Narrative ====
According to the Jain account, Chanakya was born to two lay Jains (shravaka) named Chanin and Chaneshvari. His birthplace was the Chanaka village in Golla vishaya (district). The identity of "Golla" is not certain, but Hemachandra states that Chanakya was a Dramila, implying that he was a native of South India.

Chanakya was born with a full set of teeth. According to the monks, this was a sign that he would become a king in the future. Chanin did not want his son to become haughty, so he broke Chanakya's teeth. The monks prophesied that the baby would go on to become a power behind the throne. Chanakya grew up to be a learned shravaka, and married a Brahmin woman. Her relatives mocked her for being married to a poor man. This motivated Chanakya to visit Pataliputra, and seek donations from the Emperor Nanda, who was famous for his generosity towards Brahmins. While waiting for the emperor at the imperial court, Chanakya sat on the emperor's throne. A dasi (slave woman) courteously offered Chanakya the next seat, but Chanakya kept his kamandal (water pot) on it, while remaining seated on the throne. The servant offered him a choice of four more seats, but each time, he kept his various items on the seats, refusing to budge from the throne. Finally, the annoyed servant kicked him off the throne. Enraged, Chanakya vowed to uproot Nanda and his entire establishment, like "a great wind uproots a tree".

Chanakya knew that he was prophesied to become a power behind the throne. So, he started searching for a person worthy of being a king. While wandering, he did a favour for the pregnant daughter of a village chief, on the condition that her child would belong to him. Chandragupta was born to this lady. When Chandragupta grew up, Chanakya came to his village and saw him playing "king" among a group of boys. To test him, Chanakya asked him for a donation. The boy told Chanakya to take the cows nearby, declaring that nobody would disobey his order. This display of power convinced Chanakya that Chandragupta was the one worthy of being a king.

Chanakya took Chandragupta to conquer Pataliputra, the capital of Nanda. He assembled an army using the wealth he had acquired through alchemy (dhatuvada-visaradan). The army suffered a severe defeat, forcing Chanakya and Chandragupta to flee the battlefield. They reached a lake while being pursued by an enemy officer. Chanakya asked Chandragupta to jump into the lake, and disguised himself as a meditating ascetic. When the enemy soldier reached the lake, he asked the 'ascetic' if he had seen Chandragupta. Chanakya pointed at the lake. As the soldier removed his armour to jump into the lake, Chanakya took his sword and killed him. When Chandragupta came out of the water, Chanakya asked him, "What went through your mind, when I disclosed your location to the enemy?" Chandragupta replied that he trusted his master to make the best decision. This convinced Chanakya that Chandragupta would remain under his influence even after becoming the king. On another occasion, Chanakya similarly escaped the enemy by chasing away a washerman, and disguising himself as one. Once, he cut open the belly of a Brahmin who had just eaten food, and took out the food to feed a hungry Chandragupta.

One day, Chanakya and Chandragupta overheard a woman scolding her son. The child had burnt his finger by putting it in the middle of a bowl of hot gruel. The woman told her son that by not starting from the cooler edges, he was being foolish like Chanakya, who attacked the capital before conquering the bordering regions. Chanakya realised his mistake, and made a new plan to defeat Nanda. He formed an alliance with Parvataka, the king of a mountain kingdom called Himavatkuta, offering him half of Nanda's empire.

After securing Parvataka's help, Chanakya and Chandragupta started besieging the cities other than Pataliputra. One particular city offered a strong resistance. Chanakya entered this city disguised as a Shaivite mendicant, and declared that the siege would end if the idols of the seven mothers were removed from the town's temple. As soon as the superstitious defenders removed the idols from the temple, Chanakya ordered his army to end the siege. When the defenders started celebrating their victory, Chanakya's army launched a surprise attack and captured the town.

Gradually, Chanakya and Chandragupta subdued all the regions outside the capital. Finally, they captured Pataliputra and Chandragupta became the emperor. They allowed the Emperor Nanda to go into exile, with all the goods he could take on a cart. As Nanda and his family were leaving the city on a cart, his daughter saw Chandragupta, and fell in love with the new emperor. She chose him as her husband by svayamvara tradition. As she was getting off the cart, 9 spokes of the cart's wheel broke. Interpreting this as an omen, Chanakya declared that Chandragupta's dynasty would last for 9 generations.

Meanwhile, Parvataka fell in love with one of Nanda's visha kanyas (poison girl, assassin). Chanakya approved the marriage, and Parvataka collapsed when he touched the girl during the wedding. Chanakya asked Chandragupta not to call a physician. Thus, Parvataka died and Chandragupta became the sole ruler of Nanda's territories.

Chanakya then started consolidating the power by eliminating Nanda's loyalists, who had been harassing people in various parts of the empire. Chanakya learned about a weaver who would burn any part of his house infested with cockroaches. Chanakya assigned the responsibility of crushing the rebels to this weaver. Soon, the empire was free of insurgents. Chanakya also burned a village that had refused him food in the past. He filled the imperial treasury by inviting rich merchants to his home, getting them drunk and gambling with a loaded dice.

Once, the empire suffered a 12-year long famine. Two young Jain monks started eating from the emperor's plate, after making themselves invisible with a magic ointment. Chanakya sensed their presence by covering the palace floor with a powder, and tracing their footprints. At the next meal, he caught them by filling the dining room with thick smoke, which caused the monks' eyes to water, washing off the ointment. Chanakya complained about the young monks' behaviour to the head monk Acharya Susthita. The Acharya blamed people for not being charitable towards monks, so Chanakya started giving generous alms to the monks.

Meanwhile, Chandragupta had been patronising the non-Jain monks. Chanakya decided to prove to him that these men were not worthy of his patronage. He covered the floor of the palace area near the women's rooms with powder and left the non-Jain monks there. Their footprints showed that they had sneaked up to the windows of the women's rooms to peep inside. The Jain monks, who were assessed using the same method, stayed away from the women's rooms. After seeing this, Chandragupta appointed the Jain monks as his spiritual counsellors.

Chanakya used to mix small doses of poison in Chandragupta's food to make him immune to poisoning attempts. The emperor, unaware of this, once shared his food with Empress Durdhara. Chanakya entered the room at the instant she died. He cut open the dead empress's belly and took out the baby. The baby, who had been touched by a drop ("bindu") of the poison, was named Bindusara.

After Chandragupta abdicated the throne to become a Jain monk, Chanakya appointed Bindusara as the new emperor. Chanakya asked Bindusara to appoint a man named Subandhu as one of his ministers. However, Subandhu wanted to become a higher minister and grew jealous of Chanakya. So, he told Bindusara that Chanakya was responsible for the death of his mother. Bindusara confirmed the allegations with the nurses, who told him that Chanakya had cut open the belly of his mother. Bindusara became enraged, and started hating Chanakya. As a result, Chanakya, who had grown very old by this time, retired and decided to starve himself to death. Meanwhile, Bindusara learned the detailed circumstances of his birth, and implored Chanakya to resume his ministerial duties. After failing to pacify Chanakya, the emperor ordered Subandhu to convince Chanakya to give up his suicide plan. Subandhu, while pretending to appease Chanakya, burned him to death. Subandhu then took possession of Chanakya's home. Chanakya had anticipated this, and before retiring, he had set up a cursed trap for Subandhu. He had left behind a chest with a hundred locks. Subandhu broke the locks, hoping to find precious jewels. He found a sweet-smelling perfume and immediately inhaled it. But then his eyes fell on a birch bark note with a curse written on it. The note declared that anybody who smelled this perfume will have to either become a monk or face death. Subandhu tested the perfume on another man, and then fed him luxurious food (something that the monks abstain from). The man died, and then Subandhu was forced to become a monk to avoid death.

According to another Jain text – the Rajavali-Katha – Chanakya accompanied Chandragupta to forest for retirement, once Bindusara became the emperor.

=== Kashmiri version (11th cent. CE) ===
==== Source ====
Brihatkatha-Manjari by Kshemendra and Kathasaritsagara by Somadeva are two 11th-century Kashmiri Sanskrit collections of legends. Both are based on a now-lost Prakrit-language Brihatkatha-Sarit-Sagara, which was based on the now-lost Paishachi-language Brihatkatha (before 3rd cent. CE) by Gunadhya. The Chanakya-Chandragupta legend in these collections features another character, named Shakatala (IAST: Śakaṭāla).

==== Kashmiri narrative ====
The Kashmiri version of the legend goes like this: Vararuchi (identified with Katyayana), Indradatta and Vyadi were three disciples of the sage Varsha. Once, on behalf of their guru Varsha, they travelled to Ayodhya to seek a gurudakshina (guru's fee) from Emperor Nanda. As they arrived to meet Nanda, the emperor died. Using his yogic powers, Indradatta entered Nanda's body and granted Vararuchi's request for 10 million gold dinars (gold coins). The imperial minister Shakatala realised what was happening, and had Indradatta's body burnt. But before he could take any action against the fake emperor (Indradatta in Nanda's body, also called Yogananda), the emperor had him arrested. Shakatala and his 100 sons were imprisoned and were given food sufficient only for one person. Shakatala's 100 sons starved to death, so that their father could live to take revenge.

Meanwhile, the fake emperor appointed Vararuchi as his minister. As the emperor's character kept deteriorating, a disgusted Vararuchi retired to a forest as an ascetic. Shakatala was then restored as the minister, but kept planning his revenge. One day, Shakatala came across Chanakya, a Brahmin who was uprooting all the grass in his path, because one blade of the grass had pricked his foot. Shakatala realised that he could use a man so vengeful to destroy the fake emperor. He invited Chanakya to the emperor's assembly, promising him 100,000 gold coins for presiding over a ritual ceremony.

Shakatala hosted Chanakya in his own house and treated him with great respect. But the day Chanakya arrived at the imperial court, Shakatala got another Brahmin named Subandhu to preside over the ceremony. Chanakya felt insulted, but Shakatala blamed the emperor for this dishonour. Chanakya then untied his topknot (sikha), and vowed not to re-tie it until the emperor was destroyed. The emperor ordered his arrest, but he escaped to Shakatala's house. There, using materials supplied by Shakatala, he performed a magic ritual which made the emperor sick. The king died of a fever after 7 days.

Shakatala then executed Hiranyagupta, the son of the fake emperor. He anointed Chandragupta, the son of the real emperor Nanda, as the new emperor (in Kshemendra's version, it is Chanakya who installs Chandragupta as the new emperor). Shakatala also appointed Chanakya as the imperial priest (rajpurohita). Having achieved his revenge, he then retired to the forest as an ascetic.

=== Mudrarakshasa version (4th-8th cent. CE) ===
==== Source ====
Mudrarakshasa ("The signet ring of Rakshasa") is a Sanskrit play by Vishakhadatta. Its date is uncertain, but it mentions the Huna, who invaded northern India during the Gupta period. Therefore, it could not have been composed before the Gupta era. It is dated variously from the late fourth century to the eighth century. The Mudrarakshasa legend contains narratives not found in other versions of the Chanakya-Chandragupta legend. Because of this difference, Trautmann suggests that most of it is fictional or legendary, without any historical basis.

==== Mudrarakshasa narrative (4th-8th cent. CE) ====
According to the Mudrarakshasa version, the Emperor Nanda once removed Chanakya from the "first seat of the empire" (this possibly refers to Chanakya's expulsion from the emperor's assembly). For this reason, Chanakya vowed not to tie his top knot (shikha) until the complete destruction of Nanda. Chanakya made a plan to dethrone Nanda, and replace him with Chandragupta, his son by a lesser empress. Chanakya engineered Chandragupta's alliance with another powerful king Parvateshvara (or Parvata), and the two rulers agreed to divide Nanda's territory after subjugating him. Their allied army included Bahlika, Kirata, Parasika, Kamboja, Shaka, and Yavana soldiers. The army invaded Pataliputra (Kusumapura) and defeated the Nandas. Parvata is identified with King Porus by some scholars.

Nanda's prime minister Rakshasa escaped Pataliputra, and continued resisting the invaders. He sent a vishakanya (poison girl) to assassinate Chandragupta. Chanakya had this girl assassinate Parvata instead, with the blame going to Rakshasa. However, Parvata's son Malayaketu learned the truth about his father's death and defected to Rakshasa's camp. Chanakya's spy Bhagurayana accompanied Malayaketu, pretending to be his friend.

Rakshasa continued to plot Chandragupta's death, but all his plans were foiled by Chanakya. For example, once Rakshasa arranged for assassins to be transported to Chandragupta's bedroom via a tunnel. Chanakya became aware of them by noticing a trail of ants carrying the leftovers of their food. He then arranged for the assassins to be burned to death.

Meanwhile, Parvata's brother Vairodhaka became the ruler of his emperor. Chanakya convinced him that Rakshasa was responsible for killing his brother, and agreed to share half of Nanda's emperor with him. Secretly, however, Chanakya hatched a plan to get Vairodhaka killed. He knew that the chief architect of Pataliputra was a Rakshasa loyalist. He asked this architect to build a triumphal arch for Chandragupta's procession to the imperial palace. He arranged the procession to be held at midnight citing astrological reasons, but actually to ensure poor visibility. He then invited Vairodhaka to lead the procession on Chandragupta's elephant, and accompanied by Chandragupta's bodyguards. As expected, Rakshasa's loyalists arranged for the arch to fall on who they thought was Chandragupta. Vairodhaka was killed, and once again, the assassination was blamed on Rakshasa.

Malayaketu and Rakshasa then formed an alliance with five kings: Chiravarman of Kauluta (Kulu), Meghaksha of Parasika, Narasimha of Malaya, Pushkaraksha of Kashmira, and Sindhusena of Saindhava. This allied army also included soldiers from Chedi, Gandhara, Hunas, Khasa, Magadha, Shaka, and Yavana territories.

In Pataliputra, Chanakya's agent informed him that three Rakshasa loyalists remained in the capital: the Jain monk Jiva-siddhi, the scribe Shakata-dasa and the jewellers' guild chief Chandana-dasa. Of these, Jiva-siddhi was actually a spy of Chanakya, unknown to his other spies. Chandana-dasa sheltered Rakshasa's wife, who once unknowingly dropped her husband's signet-ring (mudra). Chanakya's agent got hold of this signet-ring, and brought it to Chanakya. Using this signet ring, Chanakya sent a letter to Malayaketu warning him that his allies were treacherous. Chanakya also asked some of Chandragupta's princes to fake defection to Malayaketu's camp. In addition, Chanakya ordered Shakata-dasa's murder, but had him 'rescued' by Siddharthaka, a spy pretending to be an agent of Chandana-dasa. Chanakya's spy then took Shakata-dasa to Rakshasa.

When Shakata-dasa and his 'rescuer' Siddharthaka reached Rakshasa, Siddharthaka presented him the signet-ring, claiming to have found it at Chandana-dasa's home. As a reward, Rakshasa gave him some jewels that Malayaketu had gifted him. Sometime after this, another of Chanakya's agents, disguised as a jeweller, sold Parvata's jewels to Rakshasa.

Sometime later, Rakshasa sent his spies disguised as musicians to Chandragupta's court. But Chanakya knew all about Rakshasa's plans thanks to his spies. In front of Rakshasa's spies, Chanakya and Chandragupta feigned an angry argument. Chandragupta pretended to dismiss Chanakya, and declared that Rakshasa would make a better minister. Meanwhile, Malayaketu had a conversation with Chanakya's spy Bhagurayana while approaching Rakshasa's house. Bhagurayana made Malayaketu distrustful of Rakshasa, by saying that Rakshasa hated only Chanakya, and would be willing to serve Nanda's son Chandragupta. Shortly after this, a messenger came to Rakshasa's house and informed him that Chandragupta had dismissed Chanakya while praising him. This convinced Malayaketu that Rakashasa could not be trusted.

Malayaketu then decided to invade Pataliputra without Rakshasa by his side. He consulted the Jain monk Jiva-siddhi to decide an auspicious time for beginning the march. Jiva-siddhi, a spy of Chanakya, told him that he could start immediately. Jiva-siddhi also convinced him that Rakshasa was responsible for his father's death, but Bhagurayana persuaded him not to harm Rakshasa. Shortly after, Chanakya's spy Siddharthaka pretended to get caught with a fake letter addressed to Chandragupta by Rakshasa. Wearing the jewels given by Rakshasa, he pretended to be an agent of Rakshasa. The letter, sealed with Rakshasa's signet-ring, informed Chandragupta that Rakshasa only wished to replace Chanakya as the prime minister. It also stated that five of Malayaketu's allies were willing to defect to Chandragupta in return for land and wealth. An angry Malayaketu summoned Rakshasa, who arrived wearing Parvata's jewels that Chanakya's agent had sold him. When Malayaketu saw Rakshasa wearing his father's jewels, he was convinced that there was indeed a treacherous plan against him. He executed his five allies in a brutal manner.

The rest of Malayaketu's allies deserted him, disgusted at his treatment of the five slayed allies. Rakshasa managed to escape, tracked by Chanakya's spies. One of Chanakya's spies, disguised as a friend of Chandana-dasa, got in touch with him. He told Rakshasa that Chandana-dasa was about to be executed for refusing to divulge the location of Rakshasa's family. On hearing this, Rakshasa rushed to Pataliputra to surrender and save the life of his loyal friend Chandana-dasa. When he reached Pataliputra, Chanakya, pleased with his loyalty to Chandana-dasa, offered him clemency. Rakshasa pledged allegiance to Chandragupta and agreed to be his prime minister, in return for release of Chandana-dasa and a pardon for Malayaketu. Chanakya then bound his top knot, having achieved his objective, and retired.

== Legacy ==
Chanakya is regarded as a great thinker and diplomat in India. Many Indian nationalists regard him as one of the earliest people who envisioned a united India spanning the entire subcontinent. India's former National Security Advisor Shiv Shankar Menon praised Chanakya's Arthashastra for its precise and timeless descriptions of power. Furthermore, he recommended reading of the book for broadening the vision on strategic issues.

=== Identification with Kautilya, author of the Arthashastra ===
Arthashastra is serious manual on statecraft, on how to run a state, informed by a higher purpose, clear and precise in its prescriptions, the result of practical experience of running a state. It is not just a normative text but a realist description of the art of running a state.

— Shiv Shankar Menon, National Security Advisor

Traditionally, two books are attributed to Chanakya: Arthashastra, and Chanakya Niti, also known as Chanakya Neeti-shastra, a collection of aphorisms, said to be selected by Chanakya from the various shastras.

Early on, the attribution to Chanakya has been questioned, (Note: Early questioning of attribution to Chanakya: Kane (1926, p. 87): "Keith [1916] and Winternitz hold that the extant Kautiliya is not the work of the Maurya minister." * Bhandarkar (1926, p. 67): "Soon after the Arthašāstra of Kautalya was published, it came to be more assiduously studied in Europe than even in India; and a view of diametrically opposite character was being formulated, namely, that the work belonged not to the fourth century B. C. but to the fourth century A. D. This is now the view which is generally held by European Sanskritists, and the late Sir Ramkrishna Bhandarkar iś perhaps the only Indian scholar who has expressed a similar opinion.opinion. The arguments on which this view is based were marshalled and enunciated by Prof. Jolly and Prof. Winternitz [1924], and were briefly indicated in a short but lucid note by Prof. Keith [1916].") and contemporary scholarship since 1965 rejects this attribution to Chanakya, regarding the Arthashastra as a compilation of a number of earlier texts written by various authors, which were compiled in a new text around the beginning of the Common Era; this text then underwent a major redaction or expansion at the end of the first century CE or in the second century. Patrick Olivelle states that the oldest layer of text, the "sources of the Kauṭilya", dates from the period 150 BCE–50 CE. The next phase of the work's evolution, the "Kauṭilya Recension", which compiled portions of these sources into a new shastra, can be dated to the period 50–125 CE. Finally, the "Śāstric Redaction" (i.e., the text as we have it today) is dated period 175–300 CE.

The Arthashastra identifies its author as Kauṭilya, a gotra or clan name, except for one verse that refers to him by the personal name of Vishnugupta. (Note: Trautmann (1971, p. 5): "the very last verse of the work [...] is the unique instance of the personal name Vishnugupta rather than the gotra name Kautilya in the Arthashastra." According to Trautmann, Kauṭilya is presumably the name of the author's gotra (clan). Trautmann (1971, p. 10): "while in his character as author of an Arthashastra he is generally referred to by his gotra name, Kautilya.") One of the earliest Sanskrit literatures to identify Chanakya with Vishnugupta explicitly was the Panchatantra (2nd c. CE). K. C. Ojha proposes that the traditional identification of Vishnugupta with Kauṭilya was caused by a confusion of the text's editor and its originator. He suggests that Vishnugupta was a redactor of the original work of Kauṭilya.

R. P. Kangle, writing in the 1960s, found the traditional attribution to the Maurya prime minister Chanakya acceptable, therefore dating the Arthashastra to Mauryan times. Critical scholarship after Kangle, such as Thomas Trautmann and Patrick Olivelle, following Thomas Burrow, reject this identification of Chanakya and Kautilya, (Note: Trautmann (1971, p. 67): "T. Burrow ("Cāṇakya and Kauṭalya", Annals of the Bhandarkar Oriental Research Institute 48–49, 1968, pp. 17 ff.) has now shown that Cāṇakya is also a gotra name, which in conjunction with other evidence makes it clear that we are dealing with two distinct persons, the minister Cāṇakya of legend and Kauṭilya the compiler of the Arthashastra. Furthermore, this throws the balance of evidence in favour of the view that the second name was originally spelt Kauṭalya, and that after the compiler of the Arth came to be identified with the Mauryan minister, it was altered to Kauṭilya (as it appears in Āryaśūra, Viśākhadatta and Bāna) for the sake of the pun. We must then assume that the later spelling subsequently replaced the earlier in the gotra lists and elsewhere.'") as it is a later development from the Gupta period. Trautmann points out that none of the earlier sources that refer to Chanakya mention his authorship of the Arthashastra, and Olivelle notes that "the name Canakya, however, is completely absent from the text." The identification happens at the penultimate paragraph of the Arthashastra, which states, "without the explicit use of the name Canakya," that the treatise was authored by the person who rescued the country from the Nanda kings," that is, the Maurya prime minister Chanakya who played a pivotal role in the overthrow of the Nanda dynasty.

The Guptas tried to present themselves symbolically as the legitimate successors of the Mauryas, even using the names "Chandragupta" and "Gupta," a connection also made in the play Mudraraksasa, composed in the time of the Guptas. The verse seems to be a later interpolation, and Olivelle proposes that it was an attempt to identify the author of the political treatise, which was followed by the Guptas, with the renowned Maurya prime minister.

Several reasons are given for the persistent scholarly attribution to Chanakya, which from the beginning has been "heavily influenced" by this traditional attribution, and has led many scholars to an a priori dating to Mauryan times. One reason is the reception by Indian nationalists, who saw it "as evidence of a pragmatic and virile tradition of self-rule in India’s past." According to Trautmann, "[n]ationalist aspirations seemed somehow fortified when the existence of strongly centralized empires and native schools of political theory was shown." Furthermore, the identification with Kautilya provided "a link to the most powerful dynasty in South Asian antiquity: the Mauryan Empire, and "[g]iven the absolute paucity of sources for this most intriguing era, many scholars seem unable to resist using the Arthaśāstra as a source for the period, despite a decided lack of supporting evidence." According to McClish, "the desire on the part of Indologists to possess just such a source seems to have exerted, in general, a strong influence on conclusions about the compositional history of the text."

Kautilya's works were lost near the end of the Gupta Empire in the sixth century CE and not rediscovered until the early 20th century, when the Arthashastra was discovered in 1905 by librarian Rudrapatna Shamasastry in an uncatalogued group of ancient palm-leaf manuscripts donated by an unknown pandit to the Oriental Research Institute Mysore. It discusses monetary and fiscal policies, welfare, international relations, and war strategies in detail. The text also outlines the duties of a ruler. Kautilya uses different terms to describe war other than dharma-yuddha (just war), such as kutayudhha (unjust war).

Kautilya's work is thought of as an important precursor to classical economics. and based on the identification of Kautilya with Chanakya, K.N. Jha considers Chanakya as the pioneer of the field of political science and economics in India, .

=== Naming ===
The diplomatic enclave in New Delhi is named Chanakyapuri in honour of Chanakya. Institutes named after him include Training Ship Chanakya, Chanakya National Law University and Chanakya Institute of Public Leadership. Chanakya circle in Mysore has been named after him.

=== In popular culture ===
==== Plays ====
Several modern adaptations of the legend of Chanakya narrate his story in a semi-fictional form, extending these legends. In Chandragupta (1911), a play by Dwijendralal Ray, the Nanda king exiles his half-brother Chandragupta, who joins the army of Alexander the Great. Later, with help from Chanakya and Katyayan (the former Prime Minister of Magadha), Chandragupta defeats Nanda, who is put to death by Chanakya.

==== Film and television ====
- The story of Chanakya and Chandragupta was portrayed in the 1977 Telugu film entitled Chanakya Chandragupta. Akkineni Nageswara Rao played the role of Chanakya, while N. T. Rama Rao portrayed as Chandragupta.
- The 1991 TV series Chanakya is an archetypal account of the life and times of Chanakya, based on the Mudrarakshasa. The titular role of the same name was portrayed by Chandraprakash Dwivedi
- Chandragupta Maurya, a 2011 TV series on NDTV Imagine is a biographical series on the life of Chandragupta Maurya and Chanakya, and is produced by Sagar Arts. Manish Wadhwa portrays the character of Chanakya in this series.
- The 2015 Colors TV drama, Chakravartin Ashoka Samrat, features Chanakya during the reign of Chandragupta's son, Bindusara.
- Chanakya was played by Chetan Pandit and Tarun Khanna, in the historical-drama television series Porus in 2017–2018.
- Chanakya was played by Tarun Khanna, in the historical drama TV series Chandragupta Maurya in 2018–2019.

==== Arthashastra ====
- Ashok R. Garde, Chanakya on Management contains 216 sutras on raja-neeti, each of which has been translated and commented upon.
- Ratan Lal Basu & Rajkumar Sen: Ancient Indian Economic Thought, Relevance for Today, ISBN 81-316-0125-0, Rawat Publications, New Delhi, 2008, deals with the economic concepts mentioned in Arthashastra and their relevance for the modern world.
- In 2009, many eminent experts discussed the various aspects of Kauṭilya's thought in an International Conference held at the Oriental Research Institute in Mysore (India) to celebrate the centenary of discovery of the manuscript of the Arthashastra by R. Shamasastry. Most of the papers presented in the Conference have been compiled in an edited volume by Raj Kumar Sen and Ratan Lal Basu.
- Pavan Choudary (2 February 2009). Chanakya's Political Wisdom. Wisdom Village Publications Division. ISBN 978-81-906555-0-7., a political commentary on Chanakya
- Sihag, Balbir Singh (2014), Kautilya: The True Founder of Economics, Vitasta Publishing Pvt.Ltd, ISBN 978-81-925354-9-4
- Radhakrishnan Pillai has written a number of books related to Chanakya:

- "Chanakya in the Classroom: Life Lessons for Students",
- "Chanakya Neeti: Strategies for Success", "Chanakya in You", "Chanakya and the Art of War", "Corporate Chanakya",
- "Corporate Chanakya on Management" and "Corporate Chanakya on Leadership".

==== Fiction ====
- Chanakya (2001) by B. K. Chaturvedi
- Chanakya's Chant by Ashwin Sanghi is a fictional account of Chanakya's life as a political strategist in ancient India. The novel relates two parallel stories, the first of Chanakya and his machinations to bring Chandragupta Maurya to the throne of Magadha; the second, that of a modern-day character called Gangasagar Mishra who makes it his ambition to position a slum child as Prime Minister of India.
- The Emperor's Riddles by Satyarth Nayak features popular episodes from Chanakya's life.
- Kauṭilya's role in the formation of the Maurya Empire is the essence of a historical/spiritual novel Courtesan and the Sadhu by Mysore N. Prakash.
- Chanakya's contribution to the cultural heritage of Bharat (in Kannada) by Shatavadhani Ganesh with the title Bharatada Samskrutige Chanakyana Kodugegalu.

== See also ==
- Rajamandala, political theory in the Arthashastra

== Sources ==
- Bhandarkar, D. R. (1926). "Date of Kautalya". Annals of the Bhandarkar Oriental Research Institute. 7 (1/2): 65–84. JSTOR 44082682.
- Kane, P. V. (1926). "The Artheshastra of Kautilya". Annals of the Bhandarkar Oriental Research Institute. JSTOR 44082683.
- McClish, Mark Richard (2009). Political Brahmanism and the State: A Compositional History of the Arthaśāstra. The University of Texas at Austin.
- McClish, Mark (2019). The History of the Arthasastra. Cambridge University Press.
- Olivelle, Patrick (2013), King, Governance, and Law in Ancient India: Kauṭilya's Arthaśāstra, Oxford UK: Oxford University Press, ISBN 978-0199891825
- Rice, B. Lewis (1889), Epigraphia Carnatica, vol. II: Inscriptions and Sravana Belgola, Bangalore: Mysore Government Central Press
- Singh, Upinder (2016), A History of Ancient and Early Medieval India: From the Stone Age to the 12th Century, Pearson Education, ISBN 978-93-325-6996-6
- Trautmann, Thomas R. (1971), Kauṭilya and the Arthaśāstra: a statistical investigation of the authorship and evolution of the text, Brill
- Trautmann, Thomas R. (2016). Arthashastra: The Science of Wealth. Penguin UK.
- Varadpande, Manohar Laxman (2005), History of Indian Theatre, Abhinav, ISBN 978-81-7017-430-1
