= Chanakya (TV series) =

Indian television series

- DVD cover of Chanakya with English subtitles
- Genre: Historical drama
- Created by: Chandraprakash Dwivedi
- Written by: Chandraprakash Dwivedi
- Directed by: Chandraprakash Dwivedi
- Starring: Chandraprakash Dwivedi; Irrfan Khan; Sanjay Mishra; Dinesh Shakul; Suraj Chaddha; Surendra Pal; Prakash Dwivedi; Kurush Deboo; JD Majethia; Vipin Sharma
- Narrated by: Salim Arif
- Opening theme: Asato mā...
- Composer: Ashit Desai
- Country of origin: India
- Original language: Hindi
- No. of seasons: 1
- No. of episodes: 47 (list of episodes)

Production
- Producer: Prakash Dwivedi
- Production locations: Film City, Mumbai
- Cinematography: Rajan Kothari
- Editors: Mohan Kaul; Rajeev Khandelwal
- Running time: 45-50 minutes
- Production company: Shagun Films

Original release
- Network: DD National
- Release: 8 September 1991 – 9 August 1992

Chanakya is a 47-part drama epic Indian television historical drama written and directed by Dr. Chandraprakash Dwivedi that was originally telecasted on DD National from 8 September 1991 to 9 August 1992. Produced by Prakash Dwivedi, the series is a fictionalized account of the life and times of 4th century BCE Indian economist, strategist and political theorist Chanakya (also known as Vishnugupta) and is based on events occurring between 340 BCE and 321/20 BCE, starting with Chanakya's boyhood and culminating in the coronation of Chandragupta Maurya. Chandraprakash Dwivedi played the title role of Chanakya.

== Plot ==
The series is divided into three acts :-

- The early life of Vishnugupta in the kingdom of Magadha and the circumstances leading to his self-imposed exile, particularly the persecution (and subsequent death) of his father at the hands of Dhana Nanda, King of Magadha.
- The invasion of northwestern India by Alexander, his death, the rebellion led by native Indian kingdoms under the leadership of Chandragupta Maurya against Alexander's successors in India, and the subsequent defeat of the Greek invaders.
- The attack on and overthrow of the Nanda rule in Magadha and the crowning of Chandragupta as the King of Magadha.

Within this framework, Dwivedi portrays the politics that governed relations between kings and officials of that time. He cleverly covers the workings of the early Indian republics and the way of life of ordinary Indians.

While critically acclaimed, Chanakya has been the subject of political controversy too. It has been televised in many countries around the world and has won five Uptron Awards. The series was widely praised for its authenticity, casting and larger than life depiction.

== Production ==
=== Development ===
Dwivedi spent more than nine years researching Chanakya and read over 180 books on the subject including the Arthashastra. For him, Chanakya was "the first man with a national consciousness." And that is what made him take up the project:

I am not interested in the present; my idea is to delve into the past and link it with the present. After a great deal of thinking I discovered that politics is the crux of all sciences, just as Chanakya said.... Today the question of national consciousness is agitating the minds of our countrymen. Was it not Chanakya who defined Rashtra and paved the way for the first one?

Chanakya started out as an idea for a film. But Dwivedi abandoned the plan and decided to make it into a television series because it was not possible to meet "telecast deadlines" if it had been shot as a film. Dwivedi didn't conceive of the series as a "purely factual account" of Chanakya's life and times. But he did want "to present a work of fiction based on historical evidence—unlike the serials Ramayan and Mahabharat which presented history with a touch of masala." He didn't want to "[create] false drama just to appease popular sentiments." Episodes 11, 12 and 14 were based on McCrindle's book The Invasion of India by Alexander the Great as described by Arrian, Q. Curtius, Diodoros, Plutarch and Justin, while the final episodes dealing with Chanakya's scheme to win over Dhanananda's minister, Rakshasa, were based on Vishakhadatta's 4th century CE play, Mudrarakshasa.

I want to prove that it is not only persons in high places who have changed the course of history but seemingly ne'er do wells like Chanakya from whom there had been no expectations whatever. To present Chanakya in such a light that you or me can, on seeing the serial, exclaim even I could have done that.

— Dr. Chandraprakash Dwivedi to Surya India magazine.

Initially, Dwivedi was associated with the project only in his capacity as writer while his brother, Prakash Dwivedi, was the producer. Dwivedi decided to direct the series after continued differences of opinion with the original director, Rajiv Singh, who later filed a case against the producers. Dwivedi submitted his script to Doordarshan in April 1986 and shot the plot after receiving the approval sometime in 1988. He submitted it to the channel in December 1988 and got the final approval by the end of the year. BR Chopra, the producer of Mahabharat had been interested in the series and had submitted a proposal of his own to Doordarshan. However, Doordarshan preferred Dwivedi's project to Chopra's proposal which had been "found wanting."

=== Filming ===
The pilot was shot at a cost of INR 1.8 million (15 million in 2009, as estimated by Dwivedi). Doordarshan initially allotted 26 episodes for the series and an extension was promised if "the quality was up to the mark." In early 1992, a further 21 episodes were sanctioned as against the 26 demanded, after the extension was initially (controversially) revoked, for a total of 47 episodes. The first 17 episodes were shot over nine months at an estimated average cost of INR 900,000 per episode. A huge cast of about 300 actors were involved with the production.

The production team included well-known technicians such as art director Nitish Roy and costume designer Salim Arif who had previously been involved with Shyam Benegal's Bharat Ek Khoj. Arif was also part of the cast, as narrator and as the character Sidhartak. Roy remained art director for the first 25 episodes, and Nitin Chandrakant Desai, who was assisting him, took over Episode 26 onwards.

"Magnificent sets" were created at Film City, Bombay (now Mumbai) for the series and an amount of INR 7 million was budgeted to build three cities including Pataliputra and Takshashila. Chanakya was Desai's first independent project and "[he] had to recreate the ancient grandeur of Pataliputra" for the series. Desai spent weeks at the Asiatic Library and Bombay University researching the period. The university librarian even had a separate desk installed for him in the arts and culture section after noting his "constant presence at the library, even during lunch hour, for weeks at an end." The result was a town with "26 structures, four main lanes and six bylanes," all part of a single set.

Close attention was paid to detail when it came to costumes and weaponry, so much so that a piece of armor worn by Chandragupta was procured for over INR 8,000. According to Muneesh Sappel, associate costume designer, the costumes "were based on books by Alkazi Raushan (costume advisor for the serial Mullah Nasruddin), Dr. Moti Chandra (former director of the Prince of Wales Museum), N. P. Joshi (author of Life in Ancient Pataliputra) and K. Krishnamurthy’s Early Indian Archaeology." Terracotta sculptures from the 1st century CE, the museums at Sarnath, Patna and Lucknow, and the caves at the Borivali National Park were other sources of inspiration. In a 2009 interview, Salim Arif considered his work on Chanakya to be better than that on Bharat Ek Khoj.

=== Casting ===
Dwivedi chose stage actors to play the parts in the series. Pramod Moutho, Suraj Chaddha, Ragini Shah, Ajay Dubey, Arun Bali, Vipin Sharma and Himanshu Gokani were among the first to be selected. While Dwivedi played the central role of Chanakya, he faced a problem when he looked for someone to play the adolescent Vishnugupta. It was then that his friend Akshay Vyas introduced him to Mitesh Safari. "One look at Mitesh and [Dwivedi] knew he had found his Chanakya. [He] did not even take Mitesh's screen test and told him to report directly for the shooting."

=== Crew ===
- Mohan Kaul – Editing
- Rajeev Khandelwal – Re-Editing/Editing
- Rajan Kothari – Cinematography
- Subhash Agarwal – Audiography
- Ashit Desai – Music
- Nitish Roy – Art Director
- Nitin Chandrakant Desai – Associate Art Director
- Salim Arif – Costume Designer
- Muneesh Sappel – Assistant Costume Designer
- Vivek Nayak - Make-up artist

== Cast ==
Chanakya and his coterie

- Chandraprakash Dwivedi – Chanakya (Vishnugupta/Kautilya)
  - Mitesh Safari – Young Chanakya
- Dinesh Shakul – Chandragupta Maurya
  - Abhishek Dwivedi – Young Chandragupta
- Sanjeev Puri – Senapati Sinharan (of Taxila)
- Vipin Sharma - Mahamantri Vararuchi
- Deepraj Rana – Akshay
- Bakul Thakkar – Sharangdev
- Sanjay Mishra – Nipunak
- Navneet Nishan – Shaunotra

The Greeks

- Shahrukh Irani – Alakshendra (Alexander the Great)
- Nileish Malhotra – Satrap Philip
- Kurush Deboo – Cliturcus/ Kritorus

Magadha

- Suraj Chaddha – King Dhana Nanda

Pre-self-exile period

- Pramod Moutho – Maha Mantri Shaktar
- Himanshu Gokani – Maha Amatya Vakranas
- Surendra Sharma – Shishupal (Shaktar's spy)
- Vimal Verma – Paur Milind
- Ragini Shah – Chanakya's mother
- Ajay Dubey – Acharya Chanak (Chanakya's father)
- S.P. Dubey – Acharya Abhinavgupta (Chanakya's guru)
- Meenakshi Thakur – Bhamini (Shaktar's wife)
- Mahendra Raghuvanshi – Kaaljayi (Dhanananda's spy)
- Ankur Merchant – Young Ajeya
- Punit Shukla – Young Kartikeya
- Utkarsha Naik – Chandragupta's mother
- Laxmikant Karpe – Chandragupta's uncle
- Mihir Bhuta – Young Katyayan
- Susheel Parashar – crematorium grounds-keeper
- Shikha Diwan – Angad's mother

Gandhara / Takshashila / Taxila

- Sudhir Dalvi – Ambhiraj, King of Taxila
- Adarsh Gautam – Ambhikumar, Prince of Taxila and son of ambhiraj and next king of Taxila
- Chandramohan Bounthiyal – Anujdev
- Brij Mohan Vyas – Kulpati Acharya Taponidhi
- Siraj Syed – Maha Mantri Sushen
- Namrata Sahani – Princess Alka (Ambhiraj's daughter and ambhikumar's sister)

Pauravrashtra

- Arun Bali – King Porus King of the Pauravas
- Ashok Banthia – Maha Mantri Indradutt
- Malvika Tiwari – Kalyani (Porus' daughter)
- Kirti Azad – Ashtavakra (Spy in Taxila)
- Kumar Ram Pravesh – Chakravak (Spy in Taxila)
- Anita Kanwal – Subhada (Spy in Taxila)
- Kamal Chaturvedi – Mrityunjay (Spy in Taxila)
- Chandrakant Beloskar – Minister Pishuna
- Ashish Deshpande – King Bamni, father of Porus
- JD Majethia – Malayketu, son of Porus
- Prakash Dwivedi – Monk Jeevasiddhi (Bhadanta) & Porus, father of Malayketu

Post-self-exile period

- Surendra Pal – Maha Amatya Katyayan (Amatya Rakshas)
- Irrfan Khan – Senapati Bhadrashaal
- Ashok Lokhande – Ashwadhyaksha Purushdutt
- Naresh Suri – Senadhyaksha Balgupta
- Ishan Trivedi – Acharya Ajeya
- Renuka Israni – Maitree (Ajeya's wife)
- Manoj Joshi as Mantri Shriyak (Shaktar's son)
- Vipin Sharma – Maha Mantri Varruchi
- Chand Dhar – Acharya Rudradev
- Trilok Malhotra – Bhagurayan (Head of Detective Department)
- Jairoop Jeevan – Susidhartak (Undercover Spy)
- Salim Arif – Sidhartak / Narrator
- Neena Gupta – Raj Nartaki Shweta / "Vishkanya" (poison maiden)

== List of episodes ==
Episode 27
With Minister Varruchi examining closely the business at the royal stable and the conduct of Commander Bhadrashaal, tensions start to rise between them
Episode 28
The council of ministers approves the grant of land for new university in Pataliputra. An excited Shreyak breaks this news to Vishnugupt, who warns him against excessive hopes since the history of Magadh is filled with treachery and surprises, hinting that the vote of King is still missing. Later, King indeed puts a moratorium on the decision citing the need for more deliberation. Chief Minister Rakshash commissions an espionage mission on activities of Vishnugputa.

== Re-telecast ==
The series was re-telecast on Doordarshan's DD National TV channel during the lockdown imposed by the government of India to prevent spread of the COVID-19 pandemic from first week of April 2020

== Reception ==
The series gathered much praise for its authenticity, particularly the way it used costumes and similar artistic devices. Journalist and media critic Sevanti Ninan, bemoaning the lack of attention paid to authenticity and aesthetics in Indian mythological serials, wrote in a 2000 column in The Hindu — "'Chanakya' still stands out in one's memory for its period authenticity."

The series was commercially successful for Doordarshan, bringing in INR 180 million in advertising revenues. While thinking about opening up the organization's second channel, DD Metro, to private producers in lieu of license fees, it took the Chanakya experience into consideration with a Doordarshan official commenting that "quality programmes can attract enough advertising support to sustain even small producers who could be bidding for time slots on the metro channel."

Chanakya brought instant and lasting recognition to the director and chief protagonist, Dwivedi, who is often referred to as "Dr. Chandraprakash 'Chanakya' Dwivedi."

=== Awards ===
==== 6th Uptron Awards, 1992 (for 1991) ====
- Best Director – Chandraprakash Dwivedi
- Best Actor – Chandraprakash Dwivedi
- Best Art Direction – Nitin Chandrakant Desai

==== 7th Uptron Awards, 1993 (for 1992) ====
- Best Serial
- Best Actor in a Supporting Role – Surendra Pal

== Distribution ==
Chanakya premiered on Doordarshan's main channel, DD National, in September 1991. In 1993, it was picked up by the BBC and telecast in the UK on BBC2 as part of the Saturday morning Asia Two slot. Zee TV re-ran it in 1997 when Dwivedi was the channel's programming head, and 9X in 2007–08. Since 2008, Amrita TV runs a dubbed (into Malayalam) version titled Chanakya Tantram. The series has been broadcast in the US, Canada, Indonesia, Sri Lanka, Mauritius and Nepal.

Since 1993, the complete series has been available on home video in formats including a set of 16 VHS video cassettes, 47 VCDs, and 12 DVDs.

== See also ==
- Mudrarakshasa
- Kautilya Arthashastra
- Chanakyaniti (Niti Samuchya)
- Chandragupta Maurya (2011 TV series)
- Chandragupta Maurya (2018 TV series)
- Upanishad Ganga
