= Dharma-yuddha =

Hindu concept of righteous war

Dharma-yuddha is a Sanskrit word made up of two roots: dharma (धर्म) meaning righteousness, and yuddha (युद्ध) meaning warfare. In the Hindu Scriptures, dharma-yuddha refers to a holy war or battle that is fought while following several rules that make the war fair.

For instance, in a righteous war, equals fight equals. Chariot warriors are not supposed to attack cavalry and infantry, those on elephants are not supposed to attack infantry, and so on. The rules also forbid the usage of celestial weapons (divine weapons bestowed by the gods) on ordinary soldiers (as opposed to warriors of noble birth). The build-up of weapons and armies is done with the full knowledge of the opposing side and no surprise attacks are made.

The rules of engagement also set out how warriors were to deal with non-combatants. No one should attack an enemy who has temporarily lost or dropped their weapon. The lives of women, ascetics, prisoners of wars, and farmers were also sacred. Pillaging the land was forbidden.

Dharma-yuddha also signifies that the war is not fought for gain or selfish reasons. A dharma-yuddha is waged to uphold the principles of righteousness.

== In the Mahabharata ==
In the Mahabharata epic, which describes the Kurukshetra War, the two sides agree on the following rules:

- Fighting must begin no earlier than sunrise and, should end by exact sunset. (Broken on the 14th day, after Jayadratha was slain).
- Multiple warriors must not attack a single warrior. (Broken several times, most notably in the 13th day, when Abhimanyu was slain).
- Two warriors may duel, or engage in prolonged personal combat, only if they carry the same weapons and they are on the same mount (no mount, a horse, an elephant, or a chariot). (Broken several times).
- No warrior may kill or injure a warrior who has surrendered. (Violated when Satyaki slew an unarmed Bhurishravas).
- One who surrenders becomes a prisoner of war and will then be subject to the protections of a prisoner of war.
- No warrior may kill or injure an unarmed warrior. (Broken when Arjuna slew Karna when the latter was unarmed trying to take out his chariot wheel from mud).
- No warrior may kill or injure an unconscious warrior. (Broken when Abhimanyu was slain).
- No warrior may kill or injure a person or animal not taking part in the war. (Broken several times when warriors slew horses and charioteers of their enemies).
- No warrior may kill or injure a warrior whose back is turned away. (Shakuni and Arjuna broke that rule).
- No warrior may strike an animal not considered a direct threat. (Broken when Bhima killed an elephant of Ashwathama).
- The rules specific to each weapon must be followed. For example, it is prohibited to strike below the waist in mace warfare (Broken in the final combat of Bhima and Duryodhana on night of final day of war).

== Other texts ==
Beyond the Mahabharata, the principles of dharma-yuddha are referred to in many other ancient Indian texts, including the Ramayana and the Dharmashastras or law texts.

== See also ==
- Crusade
- Jihad
- Just War
- Interventionism (politics)
- Kutayuddha
- Militarism
- Roerich Pact
- Rule of Law in Armed Conflicts Project (RULAC)
- Rule of law
- Rule According to Higher Law
