= Kutayuddha =

Sanskrit word

Kutayuddha or kuta-yuddha (Sanskrit: कूटयुद्ध ISO: kūṭayuddha/ kūṭa-yuddha, also spelt Kootayudha) is a Sanskrit word made up of two roots: kuta (कूट) commonly explained as evil genius, crooked, devious, unjust or unrighteousness, and yuddha (युद्ध) meaning warfare. While there is no exact English translation, kutayuddha is explained as the opposite of dharma-yuddha (from the concept dharma), which is in turn is explained as ethical, righteous or just war. Take ethics out of war, and you have real warfare, a kutayuddha. It is also known as Citrayuddha.

The Kurukshetra War is considered a war which was a dharma-yuddha; however the war itself contains practices of both kutayuddha and dharma-yuddha. The ancient Indian treatise Arthashastra (3rd century BCE), credited to Kautilya, gives a substantial amount of space to the methods of kutayuddha such as deception. In Hindu philosophy dharma-yuddha reigns and is the ultimate winner; however in practice kutayuddha is the necessary standard or way of life and war. The contrast of kuta-yuddha and dharma-yuddha is similar to what Machiavelli attempts to explain in The Prince (1532). The deception mentioned in Tacitus' book about the history of the Roman Empire also has similarities to concepts in Kautilya's kutayuddha. Kutayuddha has been called a defensive concept as opposed to an offensive one. A milder version of kutayuddha emerged around 900 CE. Nitisara, another ancient Indian treatise tried to balance the binaries. Kutayuddha also finds its way into Panchatantra and Hitopadesha. Shukra-Niti says that if a ruler is too weak to engage in any sort of battle including an attack from the rear, then ruler must then use guerrilla warfare.

Kutayuddha is contrasted with prakasha-yudha that can be translated as "illuminated or open warfare", in which the place and time of the battle are announced. Asura-yuddha is a type of kutayuddha that is a more lethal and amoral in terms of outcome. Tusnimdandena, using techniques such as deception or poisoning to remove enemy leaders, extends to tushnim-yuddha (silent warfare). Components of kutayuddha include dvaidhibhava (having a dual policy), dvaidhibhutah (making a pact with the enemy to attack another), having patience when third parties are fighting in a kalaha (life or death struggle), promoting enmity between third parties and attacking a third party which is facing leadership problems. Some proponents of kutayuddha include attacking non-combatants.

== See also ==
- Maurya Empire
- Military deception
- Sanātanī
