= Mudrarakshasa =

Sanskrit play by Vishakhadatta

Mudrārākṣasa
- Written by: Vishakhadatta
- Characters: Chandragupta Maurya; Chanakya; Rakshasa; Malayketu, son of Parvataka; Parvata
- Original language: Sanskrit
- Genre: Indian classical drama
- Setting: Pataliputra, 3rd century BCE

The Mudrārākshasa (मुद्राराक्षस, IAST: Mudrārākṣasa, transl. 'The Signet of the Minister') is a Sanskrit-language play by Vishakhadatta that narrates the ascent of the Emperor Chandragupta Maurya (r. c. 324 – c. 297 BCE) to power in India. The play is an example of creative writing, but not entirely fictional. It is dated variously from the late 4th century to the 8th century CE.

== Characters ==
- Chandragupta Maurya, one of the protagonists
- Chanakya, one of the protagonists
- Rakshasa, the main antagonist
- Malayketu, the son of Parvataka and one of the henchmen
- Parvataka, a greedy king who firstly supported Chandragupta but later changed his preference to Dhana Nanda
- Vairodhak
- Durdhara, wife of Chandragupta Maurya
- Bhadraketu
- Chandandasa
- Jeevsidhhi

== Adaptations ==
There is a Tamil version based on the Sanskrit play and Keshavlal Dhruv translated the original into Gujarati as Mel ni Mudrika (1889). There is a Kannada version of the play Mudramanjusha written by Kempunarayana.

The later episodes of the TV series Chanakya were based mostly on the Mudrarakshasa.

Feature film

A film in Sanskrit was made in 2006 by Dr Manish Mokshagundam, using the same plot as the play but in a modern setting.

== Editions ==
- Antonio Marazzi (1871), Teatro scelto indiano tr. dal sanscrito (Italian translation), D. Salvi e c.
- Kashinath Trimbak Telang (1884), Mudrarakshasa With the Commentary of Dhundiraja (written in 1713 CE) edited with Sanskrit text, critical and explanatory notes, introduction and various readings, Tukârâm Javajī. Second edition 1893, Fifth edition 1915. Sixth edition 1918, reprinted 1976 and by Motilal Banarsidass, 2000.
- Ludwig Fritze (1886), Mudrarakschasa: oder, Des kanzlers siegelring (German translation), P. Reclam jun.
- Victor Henry (1888), Le sceau de Râkchasa: (Moudrârâkchasa) drame sanscrit en sept actes et un prologue (French translation), Maisonneuve & C. Leclerc
- Moreshvar Ramchandra Kāle (1900), The Mudrárákshasa: with the commentary of Dhundirája, son of Lakshmana (and a complete English translation)
- Hillebrandt, Alfred (1912). Mudrarakshasa Part-i.
- K. H. Dhruva (1923), Mudrārākshasa or the signet ring: a Sanskrit drama in seven acts by Viśākhadatta (with complete English translation) (2 ed.), Poona Oriental Series (Volume 25), archived from the original on 23 June 2010. Reprint 2004, ISBN 81-8220-009-1 First edition 1900
- Vasudeva Abhyankar Shastri; Kashinath Vasudeva Abhyanker (1916), Mudraraksasam: a complete text; with exhaustive, critical grammatical and explanatory notes, complete translation, and introduction, Ahmedabad
- Ananta Paṇḍita (1945), Dasharatha Sharma (critical introduction) (ed.), Mudrarakshasapurvasamkathanaka of Anantasarman (with an anonymous prose narrative), Bikaner: Anup Sanskrit Library
- P. Lal (1964), Great Sanskrit Plays, in Modern Translation, New Directions Publishing, ISBN 978-0-8112-0079-0
- J. A. B. van Buitenen (1968), Two plays of ancient India: The little clay cart, The minister's seal, Columbia University Press Review
- Sri Nelaturi Ramadasayyangaar (1972), Mudra Rakshasam, Andhra Pradesh Sahitya Academy (In Telugu script, with Telugu introduction and commentary) Another version
- Michael Coulson (2005), Rākṣasa's ring (translation), NYU Press, ISBN 978-0-8147-1661-8. Originally published as part of Three Sanskrit plays (1981, Penguin Classics).
