= Chanakyaniti =

Collection of aphorisms by Indian polymath Chanakya

Chanakyaniti is a collection of Sanskrit-language aphorisms traditionally ascribed to Chanakya. Its first European translation was in Greek in the 19th century.
