= Viśākhadatta =

Indian Sanskrit poet and playwright

- Occupations: poet, playwright

Viśākhadatta (Sanskrit: विशाखदत्तः, romanized: Viśākhadattaḥ) was an Indian Sanskrit poet and playwright. Although Vishakhadatta furnishes the names of his father and grandfather as Maharaja Bhaskaradatta and Maharaja Vateshvaradatta in his political drama Mudrārākṣasa, we know little else about him. Only two of his plays, the Mudrārākṣasa and the Devichandraguptam are known to us. His period is not certain but he probably flourished in or after the 6th century CE. Some scholars such as A. S. Altekar, K. P. Jayaswal and Sten Konow theorized that Vishakhadatta was a contemporary of Chandragupta II, and lived in late 4th century to early 5th century. But this view has been challenged by other scholars, including Moriz Winternitz and R. C. Majumdar.

== Origins ==
Based on his name, historians argue that Vishakhadatta was from Kamarupa. A colony of Brahmins were settled by King Bhutivarman, and this charter was reissued by King Bhaskaravarman. Saradaranjan Roy argues that Vishakhadatta belonged to North Bengal due to the references to śāli padd, the beauty of Gauḍa women, and the references to Khasis forming part of the army of Malayaketu. During the reign of Bhaskaravarman, North Bengal formed a part of Kamarupa, thus placing him in the Northeast.

== Works ==
=== Mudrarakshasa ===
Mudrārākṣasa ("Rákshasa's Ring") is Vishakhadatta’s only surviving play, although there exist fragments of another work ascribed to him. Vishakhadatta has stressed upon historical facts in the Mudrarakshasa, a play dealing with the time of the Maurya Dynasty.

The titles of Vishakhadatta’s father and grandfather do indicate one point of interest: that he came from a princely family, certain to have been involved in political administration at least at a local level. It seems very possible, in fact, that Vishakhadatta came to literature from the world of affairs.

Stylistically he stands a little apart from other dramatists. A proper literary education is clearly no way lacking, and in formal terms, he operates within the normal conventions of Sanskrit literature, but one does not feel that he cultivates these conventions very enthusiastically for their own sake. It would be a travesty to suggest that one can detect in his writing a clipped, quasi-military diction as it would be to think of Kālidāsa as an untutored child of nature simply because he shows himself less steeped than Bhavabhūti in philosophical erudition. But it is fair to say that Vishakhadatta’s prose passages in particular often have a certain stiffness compared to the supple idiom of both Kālidāsa and Bhavabhūti. In relative, rather than absolute, terms his style includes towards the principle of “more matter and less art.”

There have been other cases of contributions to Sanskrit literature by men of action - for instance, the three plays ascribed to the celebrated monarch, Harsha (vardhana). The ascription is plausible, and the plays are talented and worthy pieces. But unlike the Mudrārākṣasa, they adhere closely to conventional literary ideals. Harsha no doubt wished to show that he could write as well as he could rule: yet in the last resort, one suspects that he would have been more interesting to know as a man than as a dramatist. We do not know whether Vishakhadatta, on the other hand, if he was some kind of politician, was as such either original or successful; but as a playwright, he is both.

The Clay Sanskrit Library has published a translation of Mudrārākṣasa by Michael Coulson under the title of Rákshasa's Ring.

=== Devichandraguptam ===
Only the fragments of the Devichandragupta (Devi and Chandragupta) have survived in the form of quotations in the Natyadarpana of Ramachandra and Gunachandra, two works of king Bhoja: the Shringaraprakasha and the Sarasvatikanthabharana, and the Natakalakshana Ratnakosha of Sagaranandi. By collating the quotations from these works, the storyline of this text has been reconstructed.

Devichandgraputa is a play which tells how King Ramagupta is cheated into signing a humiliating treaty with a Saka ruler. Under the treaty, Ramagupta is supposed to send his wife Dhruvadevi to the Saka king. Ramagupta's younger brother, Chandragupta, the protagonist of the story, takes upon himself to avenge this humiliation. He kills the Saka ruler and Ramagupta, takes charge of the Gupta empire and also marries Dhruvadevi.

== Sources ==
- Sharma, Mukunda Madhava (1978). Inscriptions of Ancient Assam. Gauhati: Gauhati University.
