= Mahakaali – Anth Hi Aarambh Hai =

Indian mythological television series

- Genre: Mythology; Drama
- Created by: Siddharth Kumar Tewary
- Based on: Devi Mahatmya; Kalika Purana; Devi-Bhagavata Purana
- Written by: Vinod Sharma
- Screenplay by: Utkarsh Naithani
- Story by: Siddharth Kumar Tewary; Utkarsh Naithani
- Creative director: Nitin Mathura Gupta
- Starring: See Below
- Opening theme: Kram Kreem Hum Hreem Kalikaye Hum Phat
- Country of origin: India
- Original language: Hindi
- No. of seasons: 1
- No. of episodes: 95

Production
- Producers: Gayatri Gil Tewary; Rahul Kumar Tewary
- Cinematography: Anshumann Mandlay
- Editors: Paresh Shah; Madan Mishra
- Camera setup: Multi-Camera
- Running time: 45 minutes
- Production company: Swastik Productions

Original release
- Network: Colors TV
- Release: 22 July 2017 – 5 August 2018

Mahakaali — Anth Hi Aarambh Hai (transl. Mahakali — The end marks the beginning) is an Indian Hindi-language television series that premiered on 22 July 2017 on Colors TV and concluded on 5 August 2018. The show traced the epic story of Goddess Parvati's metamorphosis into Goddess Mahakali. Produced by Siddharth Kumar Tewary's Swastik Productions, it starred Pooja Sharma in the title role of Goddess Mahakali and Sourabh Raj Jain as Lord Shiva.

== Plot ==
The show's plot revolves around the much-adored tale of Parvati (the wife of Shiva) and her alter-ego, Mahakali.

Adishakti, the Goddess of the Universe creates the trinity gods Brahma, Vishnu and Shiva, but creates only two respective wives, one for Brahma and Vishnu, Saraswati and Lakshmi. According to her promise to Shiva, who expressed his love to her, she takes multiple births on earth to woo and wed Him. He is entrusted with the duty of transforming her earthly incarnations into Mahakali but failed 107 times (of which the 107th birth was of Sati). So, Adishakti finally incarnates as the Goddess of the Himalayas and is named as Parvati the 108th birth.

With her strong will and intense devotion, Parvati becomes the wife of Shiva. However, their marriage is threatened when the demon king Shumbha along with his brother Nishumbha and their demon army attacks. Shumbha expresses his desire to marry Parvati and wages war against Shiva. In an attempt to protect all those who have taken up refuge in her home at Mount Kailash, Parvati rushes into the war, successfully channeling Mahakali, her untamed avenger warrior side through her unbound rage. Her rampage inspires other goddesses like Lakshmi, Saraswati and Indrani to bring forth their inner warriors and fight alongside Mahakali.

Mahakali is able to overthrow Shumbha's and Nishumbha's tyrannical rule and slay all his associates (including famed demons like Mahishasura, Bhandasura, Tarakasura, Raktabija and Chanda and Munda) in the process.

In years following her triumph, Shiva and Parvati expand their family to include their sons Ganesha and Kartikeya. Further stories highlight annihilation of threats like Banasura, Narakasura, Arunasura, Durgamasura, Andhakasura and the like – all being formidable demons she famously killed in various incarnations. The show also highlights the importance of family sticking up for each other, as the Kailash-Parivar face multiple social challenges and deconstruct many primitive thought processes.

== Cast ==
=== Main ===
- Pooja Sharma as Sati / Parvati
  - Also as Shakti / Adi Parashakti / Kali / Mahakali / Chamunda / Bhadrakali / Tara / Tripura Sundari / Bhuvaneshvari / Bhairavi / Chhinnamasta / Dhumavati / Bagalamukhi / Matangi / Kamalatmika / Ambika / Ardhanarishvara / Durga / Shailaputri / Brahmacharini / Chandraghanta / Kushmanda / Skandamata / Katyayani/ Kalaratri / Mahagauri / Siddhidhatri / Kamakhya / Annapurna / Mhalsa / Hinglaj Mata / Devi Kanya Kumari / Shakambhari
- Sourabh Raaj Jain as Shiva
  - Also as Veerabhadra / Bhairava / Ardhanarishvara / Mahakal / Martanda Bhairava / Nataraja
- Meghan Jadhav as Kartikeya
- Krish Chauhan as Ganesha
- Nikita Sharma as Lakshmi / Radha
- Kanan Malhotra as Vishnu / Krishna
- Falaq Naaz as Saraswati
- Akash Kumar as Brahma
- Gagan Kang / Manish Bishla as Indra
- Chahat Pandey as Devasena
- Arjit Lavania / Abhishek Avasthi as Nandi
- Hitanshu Jinsi as Vayu
- Arjun Singh Dalal as Surya
- Pratham Kunwar / Akhil Kataria as Chandra
- Vishal Nayak as Agni
- Jai Harshvardhan Dhull as Varuna
- Naveen Jinger as Himavan
- Debina Bonerjee / Rimpi Das as Ganga
- Himanshu Bamzai as Narantaka-Devantaka
- Sandeep Aurora as Sugriv
- Vijay Badlani as Narada
- Deepak Jethi as Daksha
- Sampada Vaze as Prasuti
- Rohit Khurana as Shani
- Preeti Chaudhary as Kritika
- Nimai Bali as Maharishi Ushana
- Brownie Parashar as Bhringi
- Shafaq Naaz as Vrinda
- Chandni Bhagwanani as Behula
- Reshmi Ghosh as Manasa
- Amrita Prakash / Divyangana Jain as Mohini
- Farooq Saeed as Gautama
- Piyali Munsi as Ahalya
- Pranav Sahay as Dāruka
- Sneha Namanandi as Daruka
- Vinit Kakar as Madhu
- Rohit Bakshi as Kamadeva / Bhandasura
- Vinita Joshi Takkar as Rati
- Aabhaas Mehta as Shumbha
- Danish Akhtar / Varun Pandey as Nishumbha
- Sagar Saikia as Raktabija
- Kamaljeet Rana as Dushan
- Chirag Jani as Bhimasura
- Prateek Vohra as Hiranyaksha
- Joy Mathur as Tarakasura
- Nirbhay Wadhwa as Mahishasura
- Kunal Bakshi as Andhakasura
- V S Prince Ratan as Akash Dev
- Dinesh Mehta as Narakasura
- Shaji Choudhary as Banasura
- Shilpa Saklani as Diti
- Unknown as Adi

== Production ==
=== Development ===
We are utilizing high-end VFX and prosthetics to highlight the fantastical element in the story, in keeping with the mythological era. Intense research has led us to the ideal depiction on-screen, and we hope that the viewers like Mahakaali as much as they have supported Karmphal Data Shani.”

— Siddharth Kumar Tewary

Actress Pooja Sharma also shared that it took nearly 3–4 hours for her to get painted in her Kali avatar. The set designs were different from other similar shows as the producer, Siddharth Tiwary, shared that he wanted the concept of the visualisation to be unique, and that the story would be blend of some fiction and stories from different Puranas.

== Reception ==
=== Ratings ===
The show opened up with 6507 impressions and was the third most watched urban television show in its debut week in India.

The Times of India stated, "The show is a perfect blend of drama and mythology. Compared to the other shows, the VFX effects used in Mahakali are excellent and seeps one into the world of fantasy. Right from the backdrop setting to the costume drama, the make-believe looks convincing and draws you into its tale. The show has elaborate costumes and jewellery which make it furthermore engaging to watch."
