= Siddharth Kumar Tewary =

Indian television producer and director

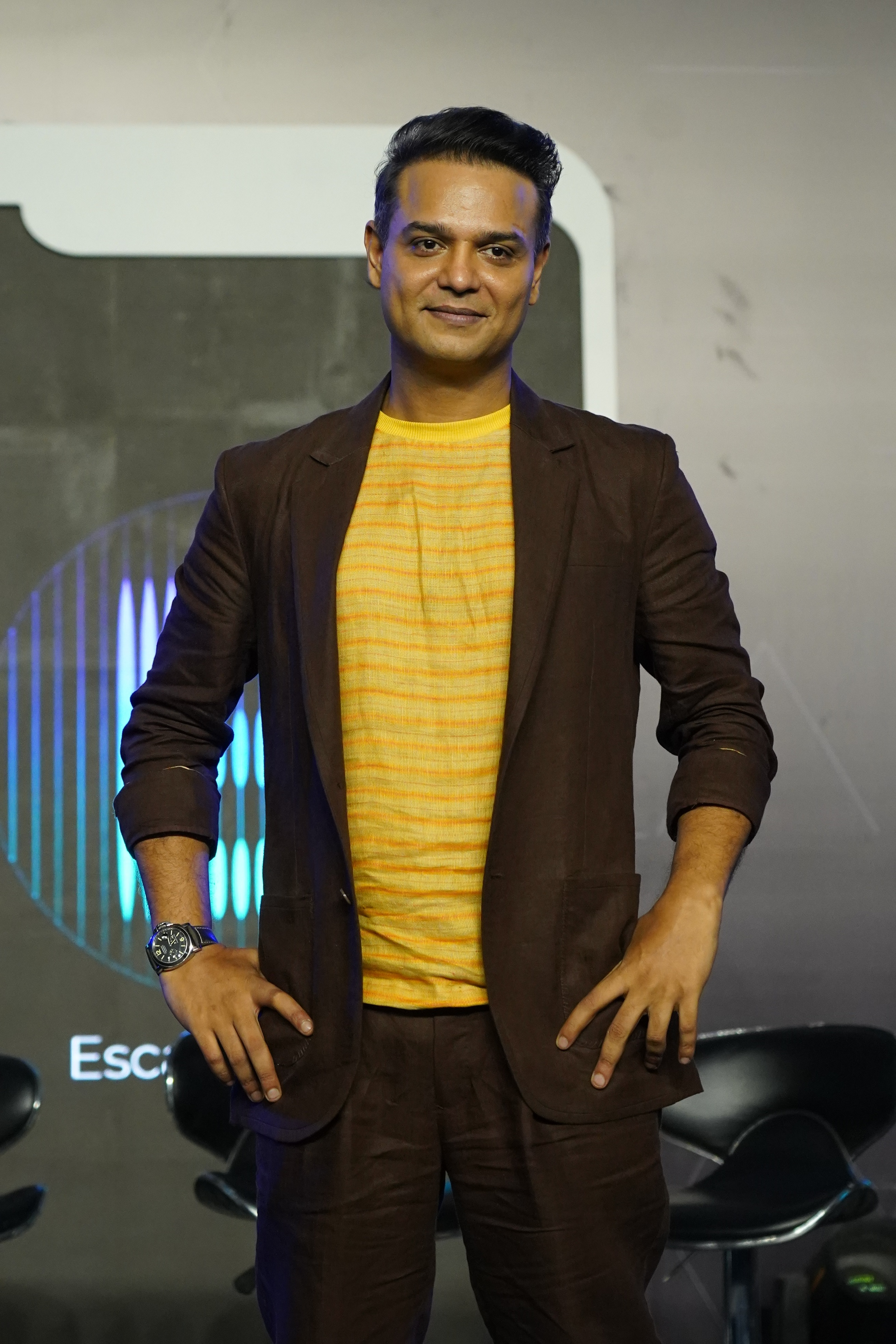
- Born: 23 January 1978 (age 48); Kolkata, West Bengal, India
- Education: Symbiosis Institute of Media and Communication
- Notable work: Mahabharatbr/>Porus; RadhaKrishn
- Awards: ITA Award for Best Director - Drama 2014; 27th Screen Actors Guild Awards 2017; Indian Television Academy Awards 2021

Siddharth Kumar Tewary (born 23 January 1978) is an Indian television producer and director. He is the founder of Swastik Productions, one of India's largest production house. Currently, he serves as the company's chief Creative Director. Tewary has been the creator and director of various shows like Mahabharat, Shiv Shakti - Tap Tyaag Tandav, Suryaputra Karn, Karmaphal Daata Shani (Colors TV), Porus (SET India), Ram Siya Ke Luv Kush and most recently RadhaKrishn (Star Bharat). He made his first OTT debut with Escaype Live starring Siddharth for Disney+ Hotstar in 2022.

== Early life ==
Tewary was raised in a middle class family at Kolkata. He studied at St. Xavier's Collegiate School and the St. Xavier's College, at the University of Calcutta in Kolkata and subsequently studied Mass Communication at the Symbiosis Film & Mass Comm in Pune.

== Notable TV shows ==
=== Mahabharat ===
Mahabharat was the adaptation of the Sanskrit epic of the same name, which depicted the rivalry of the cousins Kauravas and Pandavas of the Kuru Dynasty which ultimately led to the Kurukshetra War. The show aired from 16 September 2013 to 16 August 2014 on Star Plus. It was India's most expensive series with a total budget of INR 100 crores. The show received the highest GTVMs by any Indian Television channel.

=== Porus ===
Porus was the story of 2 Kings, Porus (King of Pauravas) and Alexander The Great (King of Macedonia) and how their fates brought them face-to-face in the Battle of Hydaspes. The show aired from 27 November 2017 to 13 November 2018 on SET India. It was India's most expensive series with a budget of ₹500 crore (US$52 million).

=== RadhaKrishn ===
RadhaKrishn was Hindu mythological television drama series that was premiered on 1 October 2018 on Star Bharat and is also digitally available on Disney+ Hotstar. The series is based on the life of Hindu deities Radha and Krishna and it has three chapters.

- Chapter 1 : Radha-Krishna's teenage
- Chapter 2 : Mahabharata
- Chapter 3 : Punarmilan

== Filmography ==
=== Current ===
- Shiv Shakti – Tap Tyaag Tandav
- Chalo Bulawa Aya Hai, Mata Ne Bulaya Hai

=== Former productions ===
Year	Series	Channel	Ref(s)
2009–2011	Agle Janam Mohe Bitiya Hi Kijo	Zee TV	
2010	Maan Rahe Tera Pitaah	Sony Entertainment Television	
2011–2012	Navya	Star Plus	
2011–2012	Gyan Guru	Imagine TV	
2011–2012	Phulwa	Colors TV	
2011–2012	Shobha Somnath Ki	Zee TV	
2013	Amita Ka Amit	Sony Entertainment Television	
2013–2014	Mahabharat	Star Plus	
2014–2015	Bandhan	Zee TV	
2015	Razia Sultan	&TV	
2015	Dosti... Yaariyan... Manmarziyan	Star Plus	
2014–2016	Yam Hain Hum	SAB TV	
2015–2016	Suryaputra Karn	Sony Entertainment Television	
2015–2016	Begusarai	&TV	
2016–2017	Baal Krishna	BIG Magic	
2016–2018	Karmaphal Daata Shani	Colors TV	
2017	Shankar Jaikishan 3 in 1	SAB TV	
2017–2018	Mahakali – Anth Hi Aarambh Hai	Colors TV	
2017–2018	Porus	Sony Entertainment Television	
2018-2019	Chandragupta Maurya	Sony Entertainment Television	
2018-2019	Tantra	Colors TV	
2019–2020	Ram Siya Ke Luv Kush	Colors TV	
2020	Jai Deva Shree Ganesha	Star Pravah	
2020	Devi Adi Parashakti	Dangal TV	
2021–2022	Jai Kanhaiya Lal Ki	Star Bharat	
2018–2023	RadhaKrishn	Star Bharat	
2022	Escaype Live	Disney+ Hotstar	
2022–2023	Nethra	Gemini TV	
2022–2023	Dheere Dheere Se	Star Bharat	
2023	Hum Rahein Na Rahein Hum	Sony Entertainment Television	
2023–2024	Chand Jalne Laga	Colors TV	
2024	Lakshmi Narayan – Sukh Saamarthya Santoolan	Colors TV	
2024–2025	Shrimad Ramayan	Sony Entertainment Television; Sony SAB	
2025	Veer Hanuman – Bolo Bajrang Bali Ki Jai	Sony SAB	
2025	Tu Dhadkan Main Dil	StarPlus	
