= Praneet =

Praneet is an Indian name. Notable people with the name include:

- Praneet Bhat, Indian actor
- Praneet Menon, member of the Vermont House of Representatives
