= Puneet Vashist =

Indian actor

- Occupation: Actor
- Years active: 1997–present

Puneet Vashist is an Indian actor who appears in Hindi-language films and television series.

== Filmography ==
=== Films ===
Year	Film	Role	Notes
1997	Himalay Putra	Abhay's friend	
1999	Taal	Shaukat	
2000	Kya Kehna	Priya’s brother	
2000	Josh	Ronnie	
2001	Style	Vicky	
2004	Gayab	Colney’s friend	
2006	Fight Club – Members Only	Sapru	
2006	Fanaa	Captain Ijaz Khan	
2009	All the Best: Fun Begins	Chris	
2009	World Cupp 2011	Himself	Special appearance
2014	Happy New Year	Charlie's friend	
2019	Bagpat Ka Dulha	Bhatija	
2021	Babloo Bachelor	Village boy	
2025	Udaipur Files	Nizam	

=== Television ===
Year(s)	Show	Role	Notes
2000–2008	Kahaani Ghar Ghar Kii	Viraj Agarwal	
2001	Kkusum	Anil Nagpal	
2001–2003	Koi Apna Sa	Kabir Vikram Gill	
2001–2004	Kaahin Kissii Roz	Anupam	
2002	Kahi To Milenge		
2002–2004	Devi	Rohit Mehra	
2002–2009	Kumkum – Ek Pyara Sa Bandhan	Veerendra (Veeru) Sachdev	
2002–2008	Bhabhi	Prem Khanna	
2004-2005	Raat Hone Ko Hai	Vaibhav	
2004–2005	Karma	Jimmy Fernandes	
2005–2011	Woh Rehne Waali Mehlon Ki	Manav Sahni	
2006–2009	Banoo Main Teri Dulhann	Harsh	
2008	Neeli Aankhen	Vinod Oberoi	
2008–2009	Hamari Betiyoon Ka Vivaah	Kanhaiya	
2009–2011	Jhansi Ki Rani	Karma	
2013	Adaalat	Magician	Episodic appearance
2012–2014	Jeannie Aur Juju	Jin Joker	
2013	Savitri – Ek Prem Kahani	Dhumketu	
2014	Ishq Kills	Dilip	Episode 9
2014–2015	Shastri Sisters	Dr. Raghvendra Singh	
2015	Bigg Boss 9	Himself	Wild card contestant
2015–2017	MTV Big F	Arjun	
2017	Tenali Rama	Daku	
2017	Prem Ya Paheli – Chandrakanta	Badrinath	
2018	Vikram Betaal Ki Rahasya Gatha	Mahadev	
2019–2020	Ram Siya Ke Luv Kush	Vishwamitra	
2020	Kahat Hanuman Jai Shri Ram	Shani	
2023–2025	Shiv Shakti – Tap Tyaag Tandav	Narada	
2024	Lakshmi Narayan – Sukh Samarthya Santulan	Narada	
2025	Chalo Bulawa Aya Hai, Mata Ne Bulaya Hai	Ravindra Vijayvargiya	
