= Baal Krishna =

Indian mythological television series

- Genre: Mythological
- Created by: Baal Krishna; Siddharth Kumar Tewary
- Directed by: Baal Krishna; Ajay Kumar mishraChakradhari Ajay Krishna; Vikki Chauhan
- Starring: See below
- Theme music composer: Baal Krishna; Naveen Kumar, Lenin Nandi, Ravi Singhal, Prabhakar Narwade; Chakradhari Ajay Krishna; Surya Raj Kamal; Ravi Singhal
- Country of origin: India
- Original language: Hindi
- No. of seasons: 1
- No. of episodes: 350+212

Production
- Producers: Baal Krishna; Siddharth Kumar Tewary; Chakradhari Ajay Krishna; Rupali Guha; Pintu Guha; Ronald Dmello
- Camera setup: Single-camera
- Running time: 22–45 minutes
- Production companies: Swastik Productions (Baal Krishna); Film Farm India (Chakradhari Ajay Krishna)

Original release
- Network: Big Magic
- Release: 14 March 2016 – 23 February 2018

Baal Krishna (transl. Little Krishna) is an Indian Hindi mythological television series which premiered on 14 March 2016 to 24 March 2017 and was broadcast on Big Magic. The series was produced by Swastik Productions of Siddharth Kumar Tewary. Chakradhari Ajay Krishna premiered on 27 March 2017 on Big Magic. It was produced by Film Farm India and is a continuation of Baal Krishna.

== Series overview ==
Season	No. of episodes	Title	Production House	Originally broadcast (India)	
Season	No. of episodes	Title	Production House	First aired	Last aired
1	350	Baal Krishna	Swastik Productions	14 March 2016	24 March 2017
2	212	Chakradhari Ajay Krishna	Film Farm India	28 March 2017	23 February 2018

== Plot ==
The series explored lesser known stories and also dealt with widely popular stories about Lord Krishna.

== Cast ==
=== Baal Krishna ===
- Bhavesh Balchandani as and in Krishna
  - Meet Mukhi as Child Krishna
  - Jaival Pathak as Little Krishna
- Gracy Goswami as Radha
  - Deshna Dugad as Little Radha
- Harsh Mehta as Balram
  - Eklavya Ahir as Child Balram
- Suman Gupta as Yashoda
- Nimai Bali as Kans
- Sachin Shroff as
  - Krishna
  - Bhagwan Vishnu
- Amisha Shrivastava as Shachi
- Anuj Sharma as Vasudeva
- as Devaki
- Praneet Bhat / Ajay Mishra as Nanda
- Chandan Madan as Vrishabhanu
- Riyanka Chanda as Kirti Devi
- Sangeeta Khanayat as
  - Rukmini
  - Devi Lakshmi
- Saar Kashyap as Arunasur
- Ram Awana as Ravan
- Riyanka Chanda as Kirtida
- Ayaan Khan
- Aishwarya Sharma Bhatt as Putana

=== Chakradhari Ajay Krishna ===
- Vishal Jethwa as Krishna
  - Bhavesh Balchandani as and in Krishna
- Ashwani Rathore as Balram
- Vaibhavi Kapoor as Rukmini
- Sumbul Touqeer as Subhadra
- Arshifa Khan as Radha
- Rohan Birla as Arjun
- Nimai Bali as Kamsa
- Sneha Jain as Satyabhama
- Sendhwa
- Sreejita De
- Bobby Kumar
- Sagar Kumar as Shishupal
- Rushiraj Pawar as Shani
