= Chalo Bulawa Aya Hai, Mata Ne Bulaya Hai =

2025 Indian Hindi-language mythological series

- Genre: Devotional; Mythological
- Created by: Siddharth Kumar Tewary
- Developed by: Swastik Productions
- Written by: Munisha Rajpal
- Directed by: Hemant Prabhu
- Country of origin: India
- Original language: Hindi
- No. of seasons: 1
- No. of episodes: 47

Production
- Producers: Gayatri Gill Tewary; Siddharth Kumar Tewary
- Camera setup: Multi-camera
- Running time: 20–22 minutes
- Production company: Swastik Productions

Original release
- Network: SET
- Release: 22 September – 25 November 2025

Chalo Bulawa Aaya Hai, Mata Ne Bulaya Hai is an Indian Hindi-language devotional drama television series that premiered on 22 September 2025 on Sony Entertainment Television and digitally on SonyLIV. It is produced by Gayatri Gill Tewary and Siddharth Kumar Tewary under the banner of Swastik Productions and directed by Hemant Prabhu.

== Plot ==
The story follows Maniki Singh Lodhi, an 8-year-old girl living in Amba Bai village near Jhansi. Her father, Sagar Singh Lodhi, a soldier posted at RS Pura near the India–Pakistan border, goes missing during a mission. Despite uncertainty surrounding his fate, Maniki remains hopeful and firmly believes that her father will return — thanks to her deep devotion to Mata Rani (Vaishno Devi).

Accompanied by her orphan friend Ramdoot, Maniki sets out on a yatra (pilgrimage) to the Vaishno Devi shrine in Katra. During their journey, they face emotional and physical trials while being watched over by a mysterious woman named Vaishnavi, who holds a divine secret.

== Cast ==
=== Main Cast ===
- Payoja Shrivastava as Maniki Singh Lodhi – A brave and devout young girl
- Avinesh Rekhi as Sagar Singh Lodhi – Jhujhar's brother; Maniki's father; Anandi's husband

=== Recurring ===
- Kamraan Shah as Ramdoot - Maniki's best friend
- Aleya Ghosh as Anandi Singh Lodhi - Maniki's mother; Sagar's wife
- Dinesh Mehta as Jhujhar Singh Lodhi - Sagar's brother; Jhalkari's husband
- Divyalakshmi as Jhalkari Singh Lodhi - Jhujhar's wife
- Parv Khakhkhar as Jhujhar and Jhalkari's son
- Gurpreet Singh as Param - Sagar's friend
- Puneet Vashist as Ravindra Vijayvargiya (Raja Bairagi)
- Alhan Sheikh as Yug

== Production ==
=== Music ===
The music of Chalo Bulawa Aaya Hai, Mata Ne Bulaya Hai enhances the show's devotional atmosphere. The title track is based on the popular bhajan “Chalo Bulawa Aaya Hai Mata Ne Bulaya Hai,” often sung during Vaishno Devi pilgrimages. The background score blends traditional Indian instruments with cinematic arrangements, highlighting key emotional and spiritual moments in the narrative.

== See also ==
- List of programs broadcast by Sony Entertainment Television
