= List of programs broadcast by Sony Entertainment Television =

This is the list of original programming currently and formerly broadcast by the Indian television channel Sony Entertainment Television (SET) in India.

== Current broadcasts ==
Premiere date	Series
10 August 2026	Kaun Banega Crorepati Season 18
24 August 2026	The Indian Game Show
19 September 2026	Family Full House with Rohit Sharma
17 October 2026	Indian Idol Season 17

== Former broadcasts ==
=== Acquired series ===
Year	Show	Notes
2004	Chandrakanta	
2001–2002	Mahabharat	
2001–2002	Shri Krishna	
2020	Sumit Sambhal Lega	

=== Anthology series ===
Year	Show	Notes
2002–2004	Kya Haadsa Kya Haqeeqat	

=== Comedy series ===
Year	Show	Notes
2015	2025 Jaane Kya Hoga Aage	
1995	Apne Jaise Types	
2016	Bade Bhaiyya Ki Dulhania	
2009	Bhaskar Bharti	
1995–1999	Chamatkar	
2010	Comedy Ka Daily Soap	
2004–2005	Dil Vil Pyar Vyar	
1998–1999	Family No. 1	
1998–2001	Hum Sub Ek Hain	
2000	I Love You	
2010	Mahi Way	
2002–2003	Meri Biwi Wonderful	
2021	Sargam Ki Sadhe Saati	
1995	Taak Jhaak	
2017–2018	The Drama Company	

=== Drama series ===
Year	Show	Notes
2008–2009	Aathvaan Vachan	
2010–2016	Adaalat	
2006	Aisa Des Hai Mera	
1998	Alpviram	
2007–2008	Amber Dhara	
2012–2013	Anamika	
2022	Appnapan – Badalte Rishton Ka Bandhan	
2004–2005	Ayushmaan	
2010–2011	Baat Hamari Pakki Hai	
2008–2009	Babul Ka Aangann Chootey Na	
2011–2014	Bade Achhe Lagte Hain	
2021–2023	Bade Achhe Lagte Hain 2	
2023	Bade Achhe Lagte Hain 3	
2025	Bade Achhe Lagte Hain 4	
2023–2024	Barsatein – Mausam Pyaar Ka	
2016–2017	Beyhadh	
2019–2020	Beyhadh 2	
2009–2010	Bayttaab Dil Kee Tamanna Hai	
1998–2015	Bhanwar	
2013–2015	Bharat Ka Veer Putra – Maharana Pratap	
2012	Byaah Hamari Bahoo Ka	
2000–2001	C.A.T.S	
1998–2025	CID	
2018–2019	Chandragupta Maurya	
2013	Chhanchhan	
2025	Chakravarti Samrat Prithviraj Chauhan	
2025	Chalo Bulawa Aya Hai, Mata Ne Bulaya Hai	
2011–2012	Chhajje Chhajje Ka Pyaar	
1999	Chhoti Si Asha	
2009	Chittod Ki Rani Padmini Ka Johur	
2000–2001	Choodiyan	
2003–2026	Crime Patrol	
2023–2024	Dabangii – Mulgii Aayi Re Aayi	
2011–2012	Dekha Ek Khwab	
2013–2014	Desh Ki Beti Nandini	
2018–2019	Dil Hi Toh Hai	
2015	Dil Ki Baatein Dil Hi Jaane	
2013	Dil Ki Nazar Se Khoobsurat	
2001	Dil Se Dosti	
2002	Dhadkan	
2016	Ek Duje Ke Vaaste	
2020	Ek Duje Ke Vaaste 2	
1999–2002	Ek Mahal Ho Sapno Ka	
2016–2017	Ek Rishta Saajhedari Ka	
2013–2014	Ekk Nayi Pehchaan	
2014	Encounter	
1995	Gulliver	
1995–1996	O Maria	
1995–1996	Tujhpe Dil Qurbaan	
1996–2000	Just Mohabbat	
1997–1998	Jaane Kahan Mera Jigar Gaya Ji	
1997–1998	Mahayagya	
1997–1999	Thoda Hai Thode Ki Zaroorat Hai	
1998–2003	Heena	
1998–2001	Saaya	
1999	Sparsh	
1999–2001	Kanyadaan	
2000–2002	Ghar Ek Mandir	
2000–2001	Milan	
2000	Shaheen	
2000–2001	Yeh Nazdeekiyaan	
2001	Kahin Diyaa Jale Kahin Jiyaa	
2001	Tu Naseeb Hai Kisi Aur Ka	
2001–2003	Kutumb	
2001–2005	Kkusum	
2001–2002	Hum Pardesi Ho Gaye	
2002	Hubahu	
2002	Par Is Dil Ko Kaise Samjaye	
2002–2003	Kuchh Jhuki Palkain	
2003	Kahani Terrii Merrii	
2003	Sambhav Asambhav	
2003–2006	Jassi Jaissi Koi Nahin	
2003–2005	Kkoi Dil Mein Hai	
2004–2005	Kkehna Hai Kuch Mujhko	
2004–2005	Ye Meri Life Hai	
2004	Saaksshi	
2005	Rihaee	
2005–2006	Kaisa Ye Pyar Hai	
2005–2007	Ek Ladki Anjaani Si	
2006	Vaidehi	
2006	Kabhie To Nazar Milao	
2006–2007	Risshton Ki Dor	
2006–2007	Thodi Khushi Thode Gham	
2006–2007	Kaajjal	
2006–2007	Kulvaddhu	
2007	Jeete Hain Jiske Liye	
2007	Karamchand (season 2)	
2007–2008	Virrudh	
2007–2008	Kuchh Is Tara	
2007–2008	Tujko Hai Salaam Zindgi	
2008	Waqt Batayega Kaun Apna Kaun Paraya	
2008–2009	Meet Mila De Rabba	
2008	Sujata	
2008–2009	Hum Ladkiyan	
2009	Palampur Express	
2009	Ek Safar Aisa Kabhi Socha Na Tha	
2009–2010	Pyaar Ka Bandhan	
2009	Specials @ 10	
2009–2010	Sukh By Chance	
2009–2010	Jeet Jayenge Hum	
2010	Powder	
2010–2011	Tera Mujhse Hai Pehle Ka Naata Koi	
2010	Godh Bharaai	
2010–2012	Saas Bina Sasural	
2010	Rishta.com	
2010	Maan Rahe Tera Pitaah	
2010–2011	Krishnaben Khakhrawala	
2011–2013	Parvarrish – Kuchh Khattee Kuchh Meethi	
2011–2013	Kuch Toh Log Kahenge	
2011	Khotey Sikkey	
2011	Kismat	
2012–2013	Hongey Judaa Na Hum	
2012	Shubh Vivah	
2012–2013	Love Marriage Ya Arranged Marriage	
2012-2013	Kya Huaa Tera Vaada	
2013–2014	Kehta Hai Dil Jee Le Zara	
2013–2014	Main Naa Bhoolungi	
2013	Amita Ka Amit	
2014–2015	Tum Aise Hi Rehna	
2014–2015	Itna Karo Na Mujhe Pyaar	
2014–2015	Hum Hain Na	
2014	Yudh	
2014–2015	Humsafars	
2015	Mooh Boli Shaadi	
2015–2016	Parvarrish – Season 2	
2015	Reporters	
2015–2016	Pyaar Ko Ho Jaane Do	
2016–2017	Kuch Rang Pyar Ke Aise Bhi	
2016–2017	Man Mein Hai Visshwas	
2017–2018	Haasil	
2017	Yeh Moh Moh Ke Dhaagey	
2017	Pehredaar Piya Ki	
2017–2018	Ek Deewaana Tha	
2017–2018	Porus	
2017–2019	Yeh Un Dinon Ki Baat Hai	
2017–2018	Rishta Likhenge Hum Naya	
2017	Peshwa Bajirao	
2017	Jaat Ki Jugni	
2018	Prithvi Vallabh – Itihaas Bhi, Rahasya Bhi	
2018–2019	Main Maike Chali Jaungi Tum Dekhte Rahiyo	
2018–2020	Patiala Babes	
2018	Yeh Pyaar Nahi Toh Kya Hai	
2019–2020	Tara From Satara	
2019–2020	Ishaaron Ishaaron Mein	
2019–2020	Mere Dad Ki Dulhan	
2020–2021	Story 9 Months Ki	
2020–2021	Indiawaali Maa	
2021	Ishk Par Zor Nahi	
2021	Kuch Rang Pyar Ke Aise Bhi: Nayi Kahaani	
2021–2022	Kaamnaa	
2021–2022	Dhadkan Zindaggi Kii	
2021	Kyun Utthe Dil Chhod Aaye	
2021–2023	Punyashlok Ahilyabai	
2022	Mose Chhal Kiye Jaaye	
2022	Jagannath Aur Purvi Ki Dosti Anokhi	
2022–2023	Katha Ankahee	
2023–2024	Kavya – Ek Jazbaa, Ek Junoon	
2023	Hum Rahein Na Rahein Hum	
2023	Sapnon Ki Chhalaang	
2024	Mehndi Wala Ghar	
2024	Kuch Reet Jagat Ki Aisi Hai	
2024	Pukaar – Dil Se Dil Tak	
2024	Jubilee Talkies	

=== Horror/supernatural series ===
Year	Show	Notes
1995–2015	Aahat	
2001–2002	Dahshat ke 6 Saal	
2002–2004	Devi	
2002–2004	Achanak 37 Saal Baad	
2010	Seven	
2013–2014	Bhoot Aaya	
2025	Aami Dakini	
2026	Vashikaranam - Kis Par Rakhe Vishwas	

=== Mythological series ===
Year	Show	Notes
1995	Buddha	
1995	Jai Veer Hanuman	
2000–2003	Shree Ganesh	
2015–2017	Sankatmochan Mahabali Hanuman	
2015–2016	Suryaputra Karn	
2017–2021	Vighnaharta Ganesh	
2017–2023	Mere Sai – Shraddha Aur Saburi	
2022	Yashomati Maiyaa Ke Nandlala	
2024	Shrimad Ramayan	
2025	Shirdi Wale Sai Baba	

=== Reality/non-scripted programming ===
Year	Show	Notes
1996–2014	Boogie Woogie	
1998–1999	Aadaab Arz Hai	
2000	Archana Talkies	
2005	Batliwalla House No. 43	
2006–2007	Bigg Boss	
2008–2018	10 Ka Dum	
2013–2014	Boogie Woogie Kids Championship	
2001–2006	Bournvita Quiz Contest	
2014–2015	Box Cricket League	
2008	Bura Na Mano Holi Hai	
2025	Celebrity MasterChef	
2007–2008	Champion Chaalbaaz No.1	
2007–2018	Comedy Circus	
2009	Dance Premier League	
2005–2006	Deal Ya No Deal	
2009	Dekh India Dekh	
	Eating Out	
2009–2014	Entertainment Ke Liye Kuch Bhi Karega	
2005	Fame Gurukul	
2018	Family Time With Kapil Sharma	
2006	Fear Factor India	
2024–2025	IBD v/s SD Champions ka Tashan	
2004–2026	Indian Idol	
2013–2015	Indian Idol Junior	
2020–2026	India's Best Dancer	
2022	India's Laughter Champion	
2009	Iss Jungle Se Mujhe Bachao	
2001	Jeeto Chappar Phaad Ke	
2007–2008	K For Kishore	
2008	Kabhi Kabhii Pyaar Kabhi Kabhii Yaar	
2002	Kahin Na Kahin Koi Hai	
2006	Kandy Floss	
1997–2001	Kehne Me Kya Harj Hai	
2010–2026	Kaun Banega Crorepati	
2003	Kuch Kehti Yeh Dhun	
2010	Lift Kara De	
2011	Maa Exchange	
2024	Madness Machayenge – India Ko Hasayenge	
2023	MasterChef India 7	
1997–2001	Movers & Shakers	
2008	Naya Roop Nayi Zindagi	
2015–2016	Power Couple	
2017	Sabse Bada Kalakar	
2013	Sanjeev Kapoor Ke Kitchen Khiladi	
2021–2025	Shark Tank India	
2008	Sitaare Zameen Par	
2008	Yeh Shaam Mastani	
1997–1999	Star Yaar Kalakar	
2016–2025	Super Dancer	
2026	Tum Ho Naa - Ghar Ki Superstar	
1998–1999	Uncensored	
2008	Waar Parriwar	
2026	Wheel of Fortune India	
2011	X Factor India	
2024	Aapka Apna Zakir	

=== Hindi dubbed shows ===
Year	Show	Notes
1995–1998	I Dream of Genie	
1995–1998	The Young and the Restless	
1997–1998	Bewitched	
1997–1998	Diff'rent Strokes	
1997–1998	The Nanny	
1997–1998	Silver Spoons	
1997–1998	Who's the Boss?	
1997–1998	Werewolf	
2001–2002	Honey, I Shrunk the Kids: The TV Show	

=== Animated series ===
Year	Show	Notes
1998	The Real Ghostbusters	
2004–2005	Tales of Little Women	
2000–2004	Good Morning, Mickey!	
2000–2004	Mickey Mouse and Friends	
2000–2004	Mickey's Mouse Tracks	
2000–2004	Mickey Mouse Works	
2001–2002	Quack Pack	
2004–2005	Astro Boy	
2004–2005	Cyborg 009	
2004–2005	Daigunder	
2004–2005	Fancy Lala	
2004–2005	Princess Comet	
2004–2005	Princess Sarah	
2004–2005	Princess Tutu	
2004–2005	UFO Baby	

=== Specials ===
Year	Show	Notes
2003	The Music & Madness of Kishore Kumar	
2010–2013	CID Gallantry Awards	
2017	Super Night with Tubelight	

== See also ==
- List of programmes broadcast by Sony SAB
- Sony Pal
