= Arasuri Maa Ambe =

- Directed by: Shiv Sagar
- Produced by: Anand Sagar; Prem Sagar; Jyoti Sagar
- Starring: Tej Sapru; Tarun Khanna; Piyali Munshi
- Narrated by: Amitabh Bachchan
- Production company: Sagar Arts
- Distributed by: Devesh Group of Industries
- Release date: 2014
- Running time: 40 minutes
- Country: India
- Language: Hindi

Arasuri Maa Ambe (also spelled as Arasari Maa Ambe) is a 2014 Indian short film that was shot in 3D and directed by Shiv Sagar, who is the grandson of Indian film director Ramanand Sagar. The movie was narrated by Amitabh Bachchan, starred Tej Sapru and Tarun Khanna, and chronicles the history of the Ambaji temple.

== Plot ==
The story of Arasuri Maa Ambe is based on the mythical history of the Ambaji Temple, which is located close to the border of Rajasthan and Gujarat. The temple is one of the 51 Shakti peethas in India. It is believed that the Shakti Peethas were formed in the regions where the body parts of goddess Shakti or Sati fell, when Lord Shiva was carrying her corpse and performing the Tāṇḍava nṛtya, the dance of destruction, after the death of his beloved, Sati. The film tells the story of Shiva and Sati, the daughter of Daksha. The son of Lord Brahma, Daksh, was against his daughter's wish to marry Shiva. However, Sati disobeyed her father and married Shiva. The story of the film goes on to follow the myths surrounding the rivalry between Daksha and Shiva. It explores how Daksha insulted Shiva, Sati immolated herself, and Shiva performed the dance of destruction.
