= Suhani Dhanki =

Indian dancer and television actress

Suhani Dhanki Mody
- Born: 25 August 1989 (age 37); Mumbai, Maharashtra
- Occupation: Actress
- Years active: 2013 – present
- Spouse: Prathmesh Mody

Suhani Dhanki is an Indian Bharatanatyam dancer and television actress. She made her acting debut by playing the role of Madri, the princess of Madra Kingdom in Swastik Productions' Mahabharat (2013–2014). She is best known for starring in Hindi historical drama, Porus, as the female lead. Alongside acting, she has an active career as a classical dance performer, trained under Dr. Sandhya Purecha.

== Early life and education ==
Suhani Dhanki was born in Mumbai, Maharashtra. She completed her schooling at Greenlawns High School and later graduated from Jai Hind College, Mumbai. From a young age, she was trained in Bharatanatyam under Dr. Sandhya Purecha, an eminent scholar and dancer.

== Career ==
=== Dance ===
Dhanki is a disciple of the Thanjavur style of Bharatanatyam. Her performances have often integrated storytelling with dance, and she continues to be associated with classical dance institutions and festivals. Dhanki has performed across India and internationally, participating in over 400 classical dance shows.

=== Television ===
Suhani made her television debut in 2013 with the role of Madri—a young and vampish queen, who harbours a rivalry with her co-wife—in Mahabharat, a mythological drama aired on Star Plus. In 2015, she played Maya, a negative role in the supernatural series Adhuri Kahaani Hamari on &TV. In 2017, she appeared in a guest role in Piyaa Albela.

Her breakthrough came with Porus (2017–2018), where she portrayed Laachi, a fictional pirate princess and warrior. The role required her to train in sword fighting, horse riding, and underwater stunts. Her performance earned her recognition and the Best Television Actress award at the 9th Newsmakers Achievers’ Awards in 2018.

== Personal life ==
In 2017, she married Prathmesh Mody, a financial consultant based in London, United Kingdom. In February 2021, she gave birth to a daughter and is now permanently settled in London.

== Television ==
Year	Show	Role	Notes
2013	Mahabharat	Madri	Debut
2015–16	Adhuri Kahaani Hamari	Maya(Icchadhari Nagin)	Main Female Antagonist
2017	Piyaa Albela	Chandni	Cameo
2017-2018	Porus	Laachi	Main Female Lead
2022	Cuttputlli	Roshini Beniwal	Cameo

== Awards ==
Year	Award	Category	Show	Result
2018	9th Newsmakers Achievers’ Award	Best Television actress	Porus	Won.
