= Sourabh Raaj Jain =

Indian actor and former model

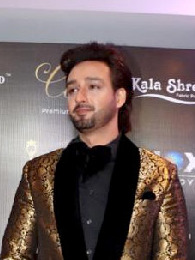
- Jain in 2021
- Born: Delhi, India
- Occupations: Actor; Model
- Years active: 2004–present
- Height: 6 ft 3 in (1.91 m)
- Spouse: Riddhima Jain (m. 2010)
- Children: 2

Sourabh Raaj Jain is an Indian actor. He became a household name in his home country with his portrayal of Krishna in Mahabharat (2013–2014), that met with nationwide acclaim and proved to be a "game-changer" for him. His portrayal of Vishnu in Devon Ke Dev...Mahadev and Shiva in Mahakali — Anth Hi Aarambh Hai also received critical praise.

Other notable television shows to his credit include Kasamh Se, Uttaran, Chandragupta Maurya and Patiala Babes. Jain has participated in the reality shows Nach Baliye 9 (2019) and Khatron Ke Khiladi 11 (2021). He left Zee News DNA show on 23 June 2024.

== Personal life ==
Sourabh married Riddhima Jain in 2010, after three years of dating. They have participated together in the show Nach Baliye 9. They have twin children, a girl Hrishika and a boy Hrishivh, born on 21 August 2017.

== Filmography ==
=== Films ===
Year	Title	Role	Language	Ref.
2008	Karma	Vijay	English	
2015	Check In Bangkok	Krish	Indonesian	
2017	Om Namo Venkatesaya	Lord Venkateswara	Telugu	
2025	Baida	Pishaach	Hindi	
2026	Veer Murarbaji†	Chatrapati Shivaji Maharaj	Marathi	

=== Radio ===
Years	Title	Role	Channel	Notes	Ref.
2016	Arth	Anchor	92.7 Big FM	Podcast	

=== Television ===
Years	Title	Role
2004–2006	Remix	Aman Deep
2007–2008	Kasamh Se	Rohit Ranvijay Chopra
2008	Meet Mila De Rabba	Sukhi
2008	Jai Shri Krishna	Lord Vishnu
2009	Yahaaan Main Ghar Ghar Kheli	Vikram
2011	Parichay	Anand Raj Chopra
2011	Chintu Chinki Aur Ek Badi Si Love Story	Aman
2011–2014	Devon Ke Dev...Mahadev	Lord Vishnu
2012–2013	Uttaran	Yuvraj Singh Bundela
2013–2014	Mahabharat	Lord Krishna / Vishnu
2015	Savdhaan India	Host
2015	Hazir Jawab Birbal	Akbar
2015–2016	Bhakton Ki Bhakti Mein Shakti	Host
2016	Mahapuran	Host
2016	Karmaphal Daata Shani	Voiceover
2016	Mahakavi	Mahapraan Nirala
2017–2018	Mahakali	Lord Shiva, Veerbhadra, Jalandhar
2018	Porus	Dhana Nanda
2018–2023	Radha Krishna	Narrator
2018–2019	Chandragupta Maurya	Dhana Nanda
2019	Kitchen Champion 5	Guest
2019	Nach Baliye 9	Contestant
2019	TV Ka Dum- India TV's Mega Conclave	Panelist
2019–2020	Patiala Babes	Chef Neil Oberoi
2021	Fear Factor: Khatron Ke Khiladi 11	Contestant
2023	DNA With Sourabh	News Anchor
2025	Tu Dhadkan Main Dil	Raghav Kumar
2026	Sangamarmar	Aditya

=== Web series ===
Year	Title	Role	Notes
2021	Qubool Hai 2.0	Hassan Farouqi	

=== Music videos ===
Year	Title	Singer	Ref.
2021	Deva O Deva	Shankar Mahadevan	
2022	Jado Main Tere Kol Si	Raj Barman	

== Awards and achievements ==
Year	Awards	Category	Work	Result
2014	Indian Telly Awards	Best Actor in a Lead Role	Mahabharat	Won
