= Reshmi Ghosh =

Indian beauty queen and actress

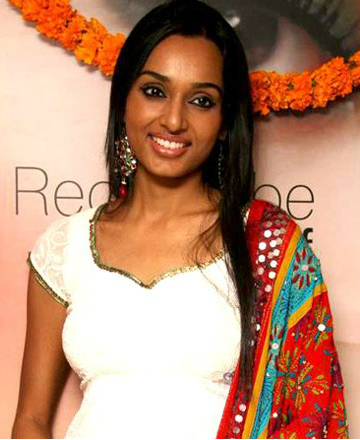
- Reshmi Ghosh at launch of Berkowits
- Born: Reshmi Ghosh; Kolkata, West Bengal, India
- Education: Jogamaya Devi College (B.A.)
- Occupations: Actress, model
- Years active: 2002–2018
- Spouse: Siddharth Vasudev (m. 2013)

Reshmi Ghosh is an Indian actress and beauty pageant titleholder. She is known for her roles in television shows such as Kayamath, Mata Ki Chowki, and Buddha. She has also portrayed the character of Kaikeyi in the Hindu epic series Sankat Mochan Mahabali Hanumaan.

== Early life ==
Ghosh was born in 1978 and brought up in Kolkata. She attended school at Carmel Convent School (Class 10, 1995 batch). She graduated with a BA from Jogamaya Devi College in southern Kolkata in 2000. She has a younger sister.

== Personal life ==
Ghosh married to Siddharth Vasudev, her co-star from Shobha Somnath Ki on 1 February 2013 at Kolkata. Ghosh and Vasudev played on-screen couple in Buddha.

== Career ==
Since being crowned Miss India Earth 2002, Ghosh has appeared in several Bollywood films as well as television serials and advertisements. She did a Bollywood movie named "Tumse Milkar", based on a song from the film Pyar Jhukta Nahin, with Parvin Dabas.

== Filmography ==
Year	Film	Co-Actor	Role	Language
2003	Aamar Mayer Shapath	Jeet	Rama Chowdhury	Bengali
2014	Bazaar E Husn	Jeet Goshwami	Suman	Hindi

=== Television serials ===
Year	Serial	Role	Channel	Production House
2006–2008	Kyunki Saas Bhi Kabhi Bahu Thi	Bhoomi Virani	Star Plus	Balaji Telefilms
2007–2008	Kahe Naa Kahe	Neena	9X	Balaji Telefilms
2008	Kis Desh Mein Hai Meraa Dil	Reshmi Ghosh	Star Plus	Balaji Telefilms
2008	Kaun Jeetega Bollywood Ka Ticket	Herself(Participant)	9X	Balaji Telefilms
2008–2009	Karam Apnaa Apnaa	Nisha	Star Plus	Balaji Telefilms
2008–2009	Kayamath	Mallika	Star Plus	Balaji Telefilms
2009	Dance Pe Chance - Tolly Vs Bolly	Participant	Ruposhi Bangla	Bhabna Aaj Kal & Rose Valley Productions
2010	Maan Rahe Tera Pitaah	Madhav's Wife	Sony TV	Swastik Productions
2010–2011	Tere Liye	Nupur Basu	Star Plus	Balaji Telefilms
2011	Mata Ki Chowki	Nirti Mata	Sahara One	Swastik Productions
2011	Baba Aiso Varr Dhoondo	Ashtami	Imagine TV	B.A.G Films
2011–2012	Shobha Somnath Ki	Indumati	Zee TV	Swastik Productions
2011–2013	Piya Ka Ghar Pyaara Lage	Urmila	Sahara One	Maximum Productions
2013–2014	Savitri	Goolika	Life OK	Flying Turtles Films
2014	Buddha (TV series)	Mangala	Zee TV	Spice Global
2014-2015	Maharakshak: Aryan	Vishkanya Twin Vishakha	Zee TV	Essel Vision Productions
2015	Baal Veer	Daityani	SAB TV	Optimystix Entertainment, Darinda Productions
2015	Sasural Simar Ka	Indrawati (Daayan's Spirit)	Colors	Rashmi Sharma Telefilms
2016	Sankatmochan Mahabali Hanuman	Maharani Kaikeyi	Sony Entertainment	Contiloe Entertainment
2016	Meri Awaaz Hi Pehchaan Hai	Protima Bose	&TV	The House of Originals
2016	Dr. Bhanumati On Duty	Chanda Chauhan	SAB TV	Optimystix Entertainment
2018	Mahakali — Anth Hi Aarambh Hai	Mansa	Colors	Swastik Productions

Awards and achievements
Preceded by Shamita Singha	Miss Earth India; 2002	Succeeded by Shweta Vijay
