= Dheere Dheere Se (TV series) =

- Also known as: Aashao Ka Savera… Dheere Dheere Se
- Genre: Drama
- Created by: Siddharth Kumar Tewary
- Starring: Reena Kapoor; Rahil Azam; Dhruti Mangeshkar
- Country of origin: India
- Original language: Hindi
- No. of episodes: 164

Production
- Producer: Siddharth Kumar Tewary
- Running time: 20-24 minutes
- Production company: Swastik Productions

Original release
- Network: Star Bharat; Disney+ Hotstar
- Release: 12 December 2022 – 7 July 2023

Dheere Dheere Se (transl. Slowly, Slowly) also known as Aashao Ka Savera...Dheere Dheere Se is an Indian Hindi-language drama television series produced by Siddharth Kumar Tewary under their banner Swastik Productions. It aired from 12 December 2022 to 7 July 2023 on Star Bharat. The series starred Reena Kapoor and Rahil Azam.

The story revolves around a widow's compromises after her husband's death, and the second chance she gets at love.

== Premise ==
Bhawna who recently lost her husband and faces difficulty to sustain her day-to-day life after her husband’s death since she was so dependent on him for her everyday necessities, but her life takes a turn when Raghav enters her life giving her hope for being independent and financially literate which helps her overcome the obstacles of her life. The show is a mirror to society which shows how a woman, especially a widow is treated in society after she loses her husband and what difficulties she goes through which are not often talked about.

== Cast ==
=== Main ===
- Reena Kapoor as Bhavana Srivastav (formerly Shastri) : Aanchal's mother, Deepak's widow, Raghav's wife (2022-2023)
- Rahil Azam as Raghav Srivastav: Brijmohan and Savita's son; Gaurav and Dimple's brother and Swati's brother-in law, Bhavana's husband; Aanchal’s step-father. (2022-2023)
- Dhruti Mangeshkar as Aanchal "Bulbul" Shastri Srivastav: Deepak and Bhavana's daughter, Raghav's step-daughter (2022-2023)

=== Recurring ===
- Vijay Badlani as Deepak Shastri: Jagjeevan's son; Bhanu and Amit's younger brother; Bhavana's husband; Aanchal's father. (2022-2023) (Dead)
- Raja Kapse as Jagjeevan Shastri: Bhanu, Amit and Deepak's father; Malini, Vidya and Bhavana's father-in-law. (2022-2023)
- Aman Verma as Bhanu Shastri: Jagjeevan's elder son; Amit and Deepak's elder brother; Abhishek's father; Dimple's father-in-law (2022-2023)
- Emir Shah as Abhishek Shastri: Bhanu and Malini's son; Aarushi and Aanchal's cousin; Meera's ex-fiancé; Dimple's love-interest turned husband. (2022-2023)
- Raju Kher as Brijmohan Srivastav: Savita's husband; Raghav, Gaurav and Dimple's father; Bhavana, Swati and Abhishek's father-in law; Aarav's grandfather. (2022-2023)
- Shama Deshpande as Savita Brijmohan Srivastav: Brijmohan's wife; Raghav, Gaurav and Dimple's mother; Bhavana, Swati and Abhishek's mother-in-law; Aarav's grandmother. (2022-2023)
- Diksha Tiwari as Dimple Shastri (née Srivastav): Raghav and Gaurav's younger sister; Savita and Brijmohan's younger daughter; Swati's sister-in law; Abhishek's love-interest turned wife; Bhanu and Malini's daughter-in-law. (2022-2023)
- Tisha Kapoor as Meera Mishra: Nirmala and Manohar's daughter; Abhishek's ex–fiancée. (2023)
- Jiya Solanki as Aarushi "Chulbul" Amit Shastri: Amit and Vidya's Daughter; Abhishek and Aanchal's cousin. (2022-2023)
- Shilpa Kataria Singh as Nirmala Manohar Mishra: Meera's mother. (2023)
- Yogesh Mahajan as Manohar Mishra: Meera's father. (2023)
- Munendra Singh Kushwah as Inspector Rajesh Kaushik: Raghav's Friend. (2022-2023)
- Bhavana Aneja as Vidya Amit Shastri: Amit's wife; Jagjeevan's middle daughter-in-law; Aarushi's mother. (2022-2023)
- Praneet Bhatt as Amit Shastri : Jagjeevan's son; Bhanu and Deepak's brother; Vidya's husband; Aarushi's father. (2022-2023)
- Malini Sengupta as Malini Bhanu Shastri: Bhanu's wife; Jagjeevan's eldest daughter-in-law; Abhishek's mother; Dimple's mother-in-law. (2022-2023)
- Nidhi Tiwari as Poonam Vikas Sharma: Vikas' wife; Shastri family's neighbour. (2022-2023)
- Mani Rai as Vikas Sharma: A tenant; Poonam's husband. (2022-2023)
- Amit Sinha as Mr. Verma: Staff of Brijmohan Srivastav at BSA Office. (2022)
- Shyam Lal Navait as Devraj: Raghav's helper. (2022-2023)
- Suman Gupta as Swati Gaurav Srivastav: Gaurav's wife; Brijmohan and Savita's daughter-in law; Aarav's mother. (2022-2023)
- Vikrant Kaul as Gaurav Srivastav: Brijmohan and Savita's son; Raghav's younger and Dimple's elder brother; Swati's husband; Aarav's father. (2022-2023)
- Brijesh Maurya as Raghav's office peon. (2022)
- Ahmad Harhash as Pulkit Shashtri: Staff Of Brijmohan Srivastav at BSA Officer. (2022-2023)

== Production ==
=== Casting ===
Reena Kapoor as Bhawana, and Rahil Azam as Raghav were signed as the lead.

Aman Verma and Ruhi Chaturvedi was cast to portray the negative lead.

=== Development ===
The series marks comeback for Aman Verma into fiction after five years.

=== Filming ===
The shooting of the series began in November 2022, mainly shot at the Film City, Mumbai. Some initial sequences were also shot at Ujjain.

=== Release ===
The first promo arrived in November 2022 featuring Reena Kapoor as Bhawana. It replaced Bohot Pyaar Karte Hai from 12 December 2022.

== See also ==
- List of programs broadcast by Star Bharat
