= Tu Dhadkan Main Dil =

Indian musical drama television series

- Genre: Drama; Musical
- Created by: Siddharth Kumar Tewary
- Starring: Aaradhya Patel; Sourabh Raaj Jain
- Country of origin: India
- Original language: Hindi
- No. of seasons: 1
- No. of episodes: 63

Production
- Producer: Siddharth Kumar Tewary
- Camera setup: Multi-camera
- Running time: 21 minutes
- Production company: Swastik Productions

Original release
- Network: StarPlus
- Release: 23 June – 27 August 2025

Tu Dhadkan Main Dil (transl. You Are The Heartbeat, I Am The Heart) is an Indian Hindi-language television drama series aired from 23 June 2025 to 27 August 2025 on StarPlus and streams digitally on JioHotstar. Produced by Siddharth Kumar Tewary under Swastik Productions and starring Aaradhya Patel and Sourabh Raj Jain. It was replaced by Kabhi Neem Neem Kabhi Shahad Shahad in its timeslot.

== Cast ==
=== Main ===
- Aaradhya Patel as Dil Kumar: Nandini and Raghav's daughter; Natasha's step daughter; Shanaya's half sister (2025)
- Sourabh Raaj Jain as Raghav Kumar: A rockstar; Saloni's brother; Nandini's ex lover; Natasha's husband; Dil and Shanaya's father (2025)

=== Recurring ===
- Swati Sharma as Nandini: Gaurav's sister; Raghav's ex lover; Dil's mother; Shanaya's step mother (2025)
- Neetu Pandey as Raghav and Saloni's mother; Dil and Shanaya's grandmother (2025)
- Ashmita Jaggi / Khushi Misra as Natasha: Raghav's wife; Shanaya's mother; Dil's step mother (2025)
- Yami Khandelwal as Shanaya: Natasha and Raghav's daughter; Nandini's step daughter; Dil's half sister (2025)
- Priya Trivedi as Saloni: Raghav's sister (2025)
- Arpit Sharma as Akhil: Raghav and Saloni's cousin (2025)
- Raj Logani as Chandan: Raghav's close family friend and manager (2025)
- Unknown as Gaurav: Nandini's brother (2025)
- Unknown as Gaurav's wife (2025)

== Productions ==
=== Release ===
In June 2025, StarPlus unveiled a teaser introducing the new show titled Tu Dhadkan Main Dil, featuring Aaradhya Patel.
