= Porus (TV series) =

Indian television series

- Genre: Historical Fiction; Drama
- Created by: Siddharth Kumar Tewary
- Screenplay by: Siddharth Kumar Tewary
- Story by: Siddharth Kumar Tewary
- Starring: Laksh Lalwani; Rohit Purohit; Rati Pandey; Aditya Redij; Sameksha; Sunny Ghanshani; Suhani Dhanki; Mohit Abrol; Praneet Bhat; Aman Dhaliwal; Savi Thakur
- Composers: Sangeet Haldipur; Siddharth Haldipur; Suryaraj Kamal; Lenin Nandi; Raju Singh
- Country of origin: India
- Original language: Hindi
- No. of seasons: 1
- No. of episodes: 249

Production
- Producers: Siddharth Kumar Tewary; Rahul Kumar Tewary; Gayatri Gill Tewary
- Production location: India
- Cinematography: Kabir Lal
- Editors: Janak Chauhan; Anil Vaishya
- Camera setup: Multi-camera
- Production company: One Life Studios
- Budget: ₹500 crore (US$52 million)

Original release
- Network: Sony Entertainment Television
- Release: 27 November 2017 – 13 November 2018

Related
- Chandragupta Maurya

Porus is an Indian Hindi-language historical drama television series based on the Battle of the Hydaspes, visualizing the lives of Porus, ruler of the Paurava Kingdom in India, and Alexander the Great, the king of Macedonia. It aired from 27 November 2017 till 13 November 2018 on Sony Entertainment Television. Another historical drama, Chandragupta Maurya, is a seamless continuation of it. The show was created by Siddharth Kumar Tewary of Swastik Productions. It is the most expensive show on Indian television, having a budget of about INR 500 crores (roughly US$60 million).

== Plot ==
=== Story of Porus (Puru) ===
In 350 BCE, A Persian trader, Darius enters India intending to conquer it due to its wealth and prosperity. Two rival Indian kingdoms, the Pauravas (of the Puru tribe) and Takshashila (of the Bharat tribe) decide to end their enmity with a political marriage of the king of the Paurava Kingdom, Bamni and Anusuya, the younger sister of Ambhiraj, the king of Takshashila. Unlike her brother Ambhiraj, who cares only for his kingdom, Anusuya dreams of a united India. Bamni reveals that he married Anusuya to avenge his elder brother and Prime Minister, Shivdutt's insult by Ambhiraj which leaves her heartbroken. However Darius manipulates her by telling her to avenge her insult by attacking the Paurav Kingdom with Ambhiraj's help. Anusuya tells his intention to Bamni who doesn't believe her. Later, Bamni realizes his mistake and starts afresh with Anusuya. They oust Darius from the kingdom. Anusuya becomes pregnant and the astrologer says that their son will be the future of this country and bring honor to the ancestors.

Later Darius conspires with Ambhiraj and Shiv Dutt, breaks the peace between the two kingdoms, and forces Anusuya to flee. During her escape, she gives birth to a son, Porus (native name Purushottam, nicknamed Puru). Shiv Dutt tries to kill Anusuya and Porus by throwing them in River Jhelum. However, the Commander-in-Chief of the Paurava Kingdom, Ripudaman saves Porus and raises him in the Dasyu Kingdom, made up of pirates. Meanwhile, Darius (who later becomes the emperor of Persia) manipulates Bamni into becoming his trade partner to gradually steal India's wealth, leaving a heavy Persian influence on the Paurava Kingdom. On Shiv Dutt's suggestion, Bamni marries Kadika, the sister of Shiv Dutt's right-hand man and Paurava general. Samar Singh. and has a son, Kanishk.

=== Story of Sikander (Alexander) ===
In 350 BCE, Queen Olympias of Macedonia insults King Philip, resulting in the latter raping her. To avenge this insult, Olympias proclaims their son, Alexander, as the son of Zeus (King of the Greek Gods) who will rule India.

=== Porus and Sikandar's meeting and aftermath ===
During Porus's trip to Persia, he meets Alexander and challenges him to come to India and go back to Paurav Kingdom. Alexander arrives in India, vassalising Ambhiraj and thus capturing Takshashila. Porus, who was in Takshashila at that time after escaping from the Paurav Kingdom with Bamni who was injured by Shivdutt, escaped from there safely along with Chanakya and made an act of Porus being dead. Chanakya invites Alexander to Porus's coronation ceremony and visits the Paurav Kingdom Alexander is shocked to see Porus alive and pledges to take revenge for this insult. Kanishk escapes imprisonment and he and Sumer ally with Alexander.

Alexander declares war with the Pauravas which lasted for months. On Porus and Laachi's marriage, Kanishk's men interrupt the ceremony, and Anusuya kills Sumer as she learns of his betrayal. Laachi asks for justice from Porus. Kanishk later tells the truth to Porus and Bamni which proves Anusuya innocent but is killed by Alexander. Dasyus allies with Alexander to attack Pauravas but later realizes their mistake and goes back to Paurvas but Laachi's mother, Mahanandini is killed off. Chanakya kidnaps Olympia and brings her to Paurav Kingdom. She performs black magic on Porus and Anusuya but fails in her attempts due to which she is on her deathbed but is saved by Chanakya. Alexander learns of Olympia's abduction and attacks Pauravas on both sides with the help of Ambhiraj. Ambhiraj kills off Anusuya and Porus takes revenge by killing Ambhiraj after which his son Ambhikumar and his mother become his enemies.

Both sides suffer heavy losses during the war, with Porus losing Bamni and Hasti. Eventually, Alexander is victorious in the Battle of the Hydaspes in 326 BCE and captures Porus, but impressed by Porus's bravery, he returns his kingdom to him, ends his campaign, and starts his journey back to Macedonia. Porus and Laachi has a son, Malayketu. On his way back to Macedonia, Alexander dies under mysterious circumstances in Babylon in 323 BCE leaving behind Roxane who was pregnant. The same year, Porus and Laachi are assassinated in a group attack by Ambhiraj's vengeful son Ambhikumar and Alexander's former general Seleucus, though Malayketu survives. In his final moments, Porus entrusts the future of India to Chanakya.

== Cast ==
=== Main ===
- Laksh Lalwani as Porus
- Rohit Purohit as Alexander
  - Vidhvaan Sharma as Alexander in infancy.
- Rati Pandey as Anusuya,
- Aditya Redij as Bamni,
- Sameksha as Olympias,
- Sunny Ghanshani as Philip,
- Suhani Dhanki as Laachi,

=== Recurring ===
- Mohit Abrol as Hasti, Ripudaman and Pritha's only son,
- Praneet Bhat as Darius,
- Aman Dhaliwal as Shiv Dutt,
- Savi Thakur as Kanishk,
- Riya Deepsi as Barsine, Darius' daughter
- Gurpreet Singh as Ambhiraj,
- Zohaib Siddiqui as Ambhikumar, Ambhiraj's son
- Hrishikesh Pandey as Ripudaman,
- Shraddha Musale as Mahanandini, The Dasyu Rani
- Chirag Jani (actor) as Arunayak,
- Akash Singh Rajput as Hephaestion: Alexander's childhood friend and closest confidante.
- Chetan Pandit/Tarun Khanna as Chanakya:
- Saurabh Raj Jain as Dhana Nanda: Emperor of Magadha
- Aparna Dixit as Roxane (native name Rukhsana): Alexander's first wife
- Vikas Verma as Seleucus Nicator: One of Alexander's generals, who was appointed Governor of Persia by him.
- Akshara Singh/Sangeeta Khanayat as Kadika: Queen of the Paurava Kingdom.
- Ashlesha Sawant as Pritha: Porus' adoptive mother, Ripudaman's wife and Hasti's mother.
- Vasundhara Kaul as Alka: Wife of Ambhiraj, mother of Ambhikumar. Queen of Takshashila.
- Nitin Joshi / Amir Malik as Cleitus: A general of Philip.
- Chandan Dilawar as Mazaeus (called Muashiz): Darius' bodyguard and aide.
- Vishal Patni as Farus: Mazaeus' son
- Amaad Mintoo as Arrihdaeus: Son of Philip and Philinna.
- Sarehfar as Philinna: One of Philip's many wives, mother of Arrihdaeus.
- Pranav Sahay as Samar Singh: Kadika's brother.
- Raviz Thakur as Pausanias: A trusted bodyguard of Philip
- Nimai Bali as Amatya Rakshasa: The Prime Minister of Magadh.
- Aruna Irani as the Oracle of Delphi,
- Riyanka Chanda as Stateira: Darius' wife.
- Shalini Sharma as Drypetis: Darius' younger daughter.
- Pooja Sharma as River Jhelum (called Mother Jhelum): The narrator of the story.
- Nalini Negi as Vishuddhi: A Visha Kanya (poison girl)
- Jaival Pathak as Malay: A boy whose village was massacred by Vishuddhi.
- Vivek Vallah as The Rajguru: The royal priest of the Paurava Kingdom.
- Ajay Jayram as Chintan Kumar:
- Sujeet Kumar as Bhairav: The main shishya (disciple) of Chanakya.
- Karishma Rawat as Cleopatra: Daughter of Philip's adviser Attalus.
- Suzanne Bernert as Ada: She was the satrap (governor) of Caria who was expelled by her own brother.
- Ruby Kakar as an Oracle: A Greek priestess and fortune teller.
- Chidaksha Chand as Cleopatra: Daughter of Philip and Olympias, younger sister of Alexander the Great.
- Rizwan Kalshyan as Alexander of Epirus: Younger brother of Olympias.
- Browny Parashar as Oxyartes: Father of Roxane, Commander-in-Chief of Bactra.
- Hanif Hilal as Thisia, King of Thrace
- Aaron W. Reed as a Persian warrior:
- Tony Huge as a Persian warrior:

== Reception ==
The show was hailed as 'visually captivating' by India Today.

Pinkvilla called it the television version of the film Baahubali.

== Sequel ==
Porus, being a finite series went off-air on 13 November 2018. Even before the end of the series, production house Swastik Pictures decided to tell the story of Chandragupta Maurya through a new show on Sony TV which replaced Porus and aired on the same time slot. Many key characters of Porus like Chanakya, Dhananand, Seleucus Nicator, Amatya Rakshas reprised their roles in the new show with the same actors portraying them. The new show Chandragupt Maurya was in seamless continuity with the ending of Porus. It went on-air on 14 November 2018 and off-air on 30 August 2019 after completing its story. Sourabh Raj Jain, who portrayed the character of Dhana Nanda in Porus reprised the role, whereas Tarun Khanna reprised his role of Chanakya and Nimai Bali as Amatya Rakshas.

== Awards ==
Year	Award	Category	Recipient	Result
2018	Lions Gold Awards	Favorite Actress of the Year (Critics)	Rati Pandey	Won
2018	Lions Gold Awards	Favorite Actor of the Year	Laksh Lalwani	Won
2018	Asian Academy Creative Awards	Best Telenova/Soap	One Life Studios	Won
2018	Asian Academy Creative Awards	Best VFX	One Life Studios	Nominated
2018	Asian Academy Creative Awards	Best Theme Song	Porus	Nominated
2018	Indian Telly Technical Awards	Best VFX	One Life Studios	Won
2018	Indian Telly Technical Awards	Best Costumes	Ketki Dalal	Won
2018	Indian Telly Technical Awards	Best Director	Siddharth Kumar Tewary	Won
2018	Indian Telly Technical Awards	Best Screenplay Writer	Siddharth Kumar Tewary, Medha Jadav	Won
2018	Indian Telly Technical Awards	Best Sound(Fiction)	Raghu Hegde	Won
2019	Asian Television Awards	Best Actor in a Leading Role	Laksh Lalwani	Nominated
2019	Asian Television Awards	Best Actor in a Supporting Role	Rohit Purohit	Nominated
2019	Asian Television Awards	Best Director	Siddharth Kumar Tewary	Won

== See also ==
- List of programs broadcast by Sony Entertainment Television
