= Pooja Sharma (Indian actress) =

Indian television actress and model

Pooja B Sharma
- Occupations: Actress and model
- Years active: 2012-2020
- Known for: Mahabharat (2013) Mahakali Anth hi Aarambh Hai (2017)
- Height: 1.7 m (5 ft 7 in)

Pooja B Sharma is an Indian actress and model who primarily works in Hindi television. Sharma is best known for her portrayal of mythological figures on television, such as Draupadi in Mahabharat and Parvati and Mahakali in Mahakali — Anth Hi Aarambh Hai. Sharma is the recipient of an Indian Television Academy Award.

== Career ==
=== Pageantry ===
Sharma was one of the top 10 finalists of Femina Miss India 2006 edition. She also won the subtitle 'Miss Beautiful Hair' in the pageant.

=== Television ===
Sharma worked as an anchor for a sports-based talk show on Doordarshan, and for Zoom TV during her college days. She made her acting debut in 2012 with Star Plus's Teri Meri Love Stories, where she played Siya Behl, an episodic role. In 2013, she portrayed the role of Draupadi on Star Plus's Mahabharat. The show was critically and commercially successful. The show ended in August 2014. In the end of 2014, she was seen as Lakshmi in comedy show, Ajab Gajab Ghar Jamai on Big Magic. In 2015, she was seen in a cameo appearance in Dosti... Yaariyan... Manmarziyan on Star Plus.

After a two and half year absence from television, in 2017, Sharma was seen portraying the role of Parvati on Colors TV's Mahakali — Anth Hi Aarambh Hai. In 2018 and 2019, she voiced over for a show and narrated three shows.

== Media ==
Sharma was ranked 17th on the Times Most Desirable Women On Television list in 2017.

== Filmography ==
=== As actor ===
Year	Title	Role	Notes	Ref.
2012	Teri Meri Love Stories	Siya Behl		
2013–2014	Mahabharat	Draupadi		
2014	Ajab Gajab Ghar Jamai	Lakshmi	Cameo	
2015	Dosti... Yaariyan... Manmarziyan	Pooja Sharma	Cameo	
2017–2018	Mahakali — Anth Hi Aarambh Hai	Mahakali/Parvati		
2018	Karmaphal Daata Shani	Mahakali	Cameo	
2019	TV Ka Dum - India TV's Mega Conclave	Panelist		

=== As voice artist ===
Year	Title	Role	Notes	Ref.
2017–2018	Porus	River Jhelum	Narrator	
2018	Chandragupta Maurya	River Jhelum	Narrator	
2018	RadhaKrishn	Yogmaya	Voiceover	
2019–2020	Ram Siya Ke Luv Kush	River Sarayu	Narrator	

== Awards and nominations ==
Year	Award	Category	Show	Result	Ref.
2014	Indian Telly Award	Fresh New Face (Female)	Mahabharat	Nominated	
2014	Indian Telly Award	Best Actress in a Lead Role	Mahabharat	Nominated	
2017	Indian Television Academy Awards	Best Actress Drama Popular	Mahakali — Anth Hi Aarambh Hai	Won	
