= Karmaphal Daata Shani =

Indian mythological television series

- Genre: Dharmic; Devotional
- Created by: Siddharth Kumar Tewary
- Written by: Utkarsh Naithani; Siddharth Kumar Tewary Raj Routh; Vinod Sharma
- Directed by: Kamal Monga; Sumit Thakur; Gurpreet Rana; Aviraj D.
- Creative directors: Amol Surve; Nitin Gupta; Siddharth Tiwetiya
- Starring: See below
- Theme music composer: Jitesh Panchal; Shyam Chetri
- Opening theme: Nilanjana Shamabhasam
- Country of origin: India
- Original language: Hindi
- No. of seasons: 1
- No. of episodes: 346

Production
- Producers: Siddharth Kumar Tewary; Gayatri Gill Tewary; Rahul Kumar Tewary
- Camera setup: Multi-camera
- Running time: 22 minutes
- Production company: Swastik Productions

Original release
- Network: Colors TV
- Release: 7 November 2016 – 9 March 2018

Karmaphal Daata Shani (transl. Shani, the divine judge of deeds) is an Indian dharmic devotional television series, which aired from 7 November 2016 to 9 March 2018 on Colors TV. The series was produced by Swastik Productions of Siddharth Kumar Tewary.

== Plot ==
The story of the series is based on the life of God Shani Dev, who is known for his justice and wrath. The serial also shows Brahma, Vishnu and Shiva as Shani's mentors. It also shows Shani's tough childhood, getting the title of karmaphaldaata, his downfall, his return to Suryalok, marriage, getting his wife's curse and finally his return as Karmphaldaata. The story is about Shani, son of Suryadev and Chaaya who is the shadow form of Sandhya, first wife of suryadev and with Sandhya, suryadev has two children namely Yama and Yami, when Sandhya cannot bear Suryadev's Heat she created Chaaya, to take Care of her Children until she returns from a tap, she Warns her not to get close to her husband but Chaaya did so against Sandhya, Shanidev was born as dark but Suryadev later accepts his colour. Sandhya hates Chaaya and her son Shani, because she thinks that Chaaya Cheated her By getting close to her husband. So, she creates much trouble for Shani and his mother Chaaya with help of Indradev. But Shani faced all this with help of his karmapal power and his karma. Later, Shani exposes Sandhya's evil character in front of Suryadev, so Suryadev chases out Sandhya and announced Chaaya as his official wife. Due to this, Chaaya Get Pregnant Again and they got a second baby named Badhra but actually because of Sandhya's evil plan Bhadhra became against for everyone and finally she killed herself but unfortunately the blame goes to Shani himself and as a result, Chaaya started to hate Shani and she took shani's karmalpal position from himself. Later, frustrating Shani forgave everything and went away and the years had gone.

10 years later, Shani returns and now he marries Dhamini due to some situation and even he earns lot of enemies namely Ravana, Indra and Rahu. However, Shani faces all and tries to keep the situation normal, but due to sevvai, Dhamini curses Shani as he never sees anyone's face, because they were getting far instead of consummating their marriage. To avoid these kind of situations, Shani must to take over his karmapal power again but Shani refused. Later, Chaaya understood Shani by Dhamini's proof and speech. Finally, Ravana took a war on Suryaloka to capture all navagrahas but Shani tried to stop him as much as he can. By the end, Shani retakes his karmapal power and even released from bane which Dhamini gave and defeat Ravana and joins with his family. Further he continues his karmapal to everyone.

== Cast ==
=== Main ===
- Rohit Khurana as Shani - Partial Incarnation & Student of Shiva; Surya and Chhaya's son; King of Shaniloka; Kakol's Mount Friend; Karmaphaldaata/Dandnayak; Sandhya's step-son; Bhadra's brother; Yami and Yam's half-brother; Dhamini and Neelima's husband.
  - Kartikey Malviya as young Shani
- Juhi Parmar as
  - Saranyu/Sandhyadevi - The goddess of clouds, First Queen of Suryaloka; Surya's first wife; Vishwakarma's daughter; Yam's and Yami's real mother.
  - Chhayadevi - The goddess of shadows; Second Queen of Suryaloka; Shani's and Bhadra's mother; Surya's second wife; Sandhya's reflection and spiritual sister; Yama's and Yami's step-mother.

=== Recurring ===
- Tarun Khanna as Shiva
- Tina Datta as Dhamini
- Salil Ankola as Surya
- Gufi Paintal as Vishwakarma
- Kunal Bakshi as Indra
- Zohaib Siddiqui as Rahu
- Tinu Verma as Shukracharya
- Kamaljeet Rana as Vyaktagandha
- Purvesh Pimple as Kakol, Shani's friend/mount
  - Praneet Sharma as young Kakol
- Sachin Yadav as Yama
  - Devish Ahuja as young Yama
- Kajol Srivastav as Yami/Yamuna
  - Drisha Kalyani as young Yami
- Shahbaz Khan as Ravana
- Saurabh Raj Jain as Narrator
- Parvati Sehgal as Neelima, Shani's power and first wife
  - Jannat Zubair Rahmani as younger Neelima
- Nirbhay Wadhwa as Hanuman
  - Krish Chauhan as young Hanuman
- Ishant Bhanushali as Ganesha/Vinayaka
- Raj Routh as Kamadeva
- Yash Bhojwani and Ayush Pathak as the Ashwini Kumaras
- Ankit Gulati as Budha
  - Shehzan Sayyad as young Budha
- Preeti Chaudhary as Parvati
- Vibha Anand / Pooja Sharma as Mahakali
- Sameer Khan as Nandi
- Diwakar Pundir as Vishnu
- Shweta Vyas as Lakshmi
- Amardeep Garg as Brahma
- Raj Singh as Chandra
- Raviz Thakur / Siddharth Vasudev as Lohitaang Mangal
- Snigdha Akolkar as Anjana
- Sudha Chandran as Sinhika
- Kunwar Naveen Jinger as Kakol's father
- Nimai Bali as Vishwamitra
- Kanan Malhotra as Harishchandra
- Suman Gupta as Taramati
- Brownie Parashar as King Chitraratha, king of Gandharvaloka
- Vishal Nayak as Vayu
- Himanshu Bamzai as Akash Dev/Jal Devta
- Pheel Mehta / Patrali Chattopadhyay as Mohini
- Sampada Vaze as Mandodari
- Vijay Badlani as Narada
- Javed Pathan as Kuparn
- Akash Singh Rajput as Raja Manu

== Awards and nominations ==
=== Awards ===
- ITA Award for Best Historical/Dharmic, Devotional Serial, 2017
- ITA Award for Best Director-Drama, 2017 - Siddharth Kumar Tewary
- ITA Award for Best Child Artiste, 2017 - Kartikey Malviya
- Zee Gold Award for Best Child Actor - Kartikey Malviya
- Golden Petal Award for Favorite Child Actor, 2017 - Kartikey Malviya
- Golden Petal Award For Best Special Effects, 2017 - Swastik Pictures
- Golden Petal Awards for Best Music Fiction, 2017 - Divya

=== Nominations ===
- ITA Award for Best Teleplay, 2017 - Utkarsh Naithani
- ITA Award for Best Actor - Female, 2017 - Juhi Parmar
- ITA Award for Best TV Show, 2017
- ITA Award for Best Actor - Male, 2017 - Salil Ankola, Kartikey Malviya
- Zee Gold Award for Best Debue in a Lead Role - Kartikey Malviya
