= Tantra (TV series) =

Indian television series

- Genre: Supernatural; Horror; Drama
- Created by: Swastik Productions
- Based on: Black Magic
- Directed by: Rajesh Ranshinge
- Creative director: Rajesh Ranshinge
- Starring: See below
- Opening theme: Tantra
- Country of origin: India
- Original language: Hindi
- No. of seasons: 1
- No. of episodes: 91

Production
- Producer: Siddharth Kumar Tewary
- Camera setup: Multi-camera
- Running time: 20 Minutes
- Production company: Swastik Productions

Original release
- Network: Colors TV
- Release: 3 December 2018 – 5 April 2019

Tantra (transl. Black Magic) is an Indian Hindi language supernatural television series based on black magic which aired from 3 December 2018 to 5 April 2019 on Colors TV. Produced by Siddharth Kumar Tewary under Swastik Productions, it starred Sargun Kaur Luthra, Juhi Parmar, Manish Goel, Gautam Singh Vig and Sameksha.

== Plot ==
Tantra is the story of a family who have fallen prey to the clutches of an evil incantation. The Khannas are an affluent family who move into their dream home Jalsa but become unfortunate victims of the gruesome practice of tantra. The antagonist is the House itself whose haunting effects make the place unliveable and a nightmare for its inhabitants. Niyati, the brave daughter of the Khanna family emerges as the one who can fight against the evil and protect her family from the witchcraft.

Jalsa is Prithvi Khanna's dream home and he gave the responsibility of constructing it to his heir, Nirvaan. It is shown that the house is alive under black magic and the only one who knows of this is the old lady who lives in the house in front of Jalsa. Saudamini, the tantric, gets the old lady to commit suicide under her tantra's influence as the old lady would have told Niyati the truth about the house. Niyati and her family move in to Jalsa and on their first night in the house, Niyati's brother Nirvaan is attacked by the tantra and almost killed, only to be saved by Niyati. Niyati notices that the wires which were choking Nirvaan were moving on their own leading to her suspicion that something is wrong. Her mother, Sumati, refuses to believe her and instead blames her for not paying attention to Nirvaan. Niyati and her childhood friend, Akshat, take it upon themselves to figure out who the mysterious lady they saw was. Later on at the Jasla's housewarming party, Kanchan is introduced as a member of the catering service. Kanchan recalls having seen Saudamini at the same party, so she tries testifying against Saudamini, but she and Akshat are abducted by Saudamini and saved in the nick of time by Niyati and inspector Bharat. The goons who kidnapped them mysteriously commit suicide without revealing who was giving them orders.

Niyati witnesses the house maid, Geeta, being dragged by supernatural forces into a wall. Terrified by the sight, Niyati tries to convince her parents about the mysterious occurrences in the house. On the other hand, Nirvaan is in love with a girl named Nisha, who is later revealed to be Saudamini's daughter. Saudamini casts a spell upon all the family members except Niyati which makes them believe that Nirvaan and Nisha are getting married in a couple of days. In a baffling plot twist, it is revealed that Kanchan is actually working with Saudamini and helping her in her evil plans and that Nisha, who is also in love with Nirvaan, is helpless and letting Saudamini pose as her mom because her real mom is being held captive. During a party at Jalsa, Nirvaan is put under a spell by Saudamini and Kanchan which causes him to misbehave with Nisha following which she reveals to Prithvi and the family that Nirvaan tried to harass her. While Prithvi questions Nirvaan's actions, Niyati supports her brother and lashes out at Nisha and Saudamini, accusing Nisha of falsely framing Nirvaan.

Nisha breaks up with Nirvaan on Saudamini's orders. Nirvaan, who is still under the spell, behaves violently, blames Niyati for the break-up and commits suicide under the spell's influence. Niyati, who was following Saudamini and Nisha to uncover their secret, loses track of them in a forest and comes across a priest who tells her that her house is controlled by evil forces. She rushes home to inform her parents only to find Nirvaan has committed suicide. Grief-stricken Niyati tries to convince the devastated family of the rituals going on in her house only to be rejected by inconsolable Sumati who blames Niyati and reveals to everyone that Niyati is Prithvi's illegitimate child. That same night, Saudamini gets Nisha killed so there is no evidence left to use against her. It is later revealed that Kanchan is Prithvi's niece. Prithvi had ousted his younger brother, Pratap, for betraying him. Afterwards, Pratap was homeless and couldn't even find a job. Due to his unfortunate conditions, he committed suicide and left his pregnant wife Sunaina as a widow. Saudamini is Sunaina's sister and she is seeking justice for her brother-in-law's death. Saudamini wanted to avenge her sister becoming a widow and Kanchan being fatherless by ruining the Khannas.

While everyone is away for Nirvaan's last rites in Haridwar, Niyati is attacked by the house and trapped inside. She is told by the Aghori that she will find the cure to the tantra in Tantra Nagri. Niyati manages to escape from Jalsa and finds a book that tells her where that village used to be. However, before she could find the cure, Niyati gets sent to the mental asylum after everyone is led to believe that she is mentally unstable. After Nirvaan's last rites, Saudamini revealed that she is the tantric that has done tantra on Jalsa. Niyati tries to expose her but Saudamini possesses Niyati with her tantric and gets her to admit that she killed Nirvaan and she is the one who is doing tantra. Seeing all this, Prithvi and Akshat are led to believe that Niyati is under a shock and needs medical treatment. But Niyati manages to escape from the asylum. On the other hand, inspector Bharat has figured out Kanchan's truth and tries to make her confess. He finds out Kanchan and Saudamini are related to one another and they are in cahoots to destroy the Khannas while. Before he can tell Prithvi anything, Kanchan pushes him off a cliff and calls Saudamini for help.

Niyati ends up hiding in Saudamini's trunk after escaping from the asylum and finds out that Kanchan is Saudamini's niece and confronts them. Saudamini and Kanchan reveal to Niyati that Prithvi isn't her real dad, and at the same time Prithvi ends up revealing to the entire family that Niyati isn't his illegitimate child, but his younger brother, Pratap's daughter. Niyati finds out that Kanchan is her twin sister. In the Khanna household, Pratap's real truth is exposed. Pratap had deceived his brother and stolen from him. Pratap was a selfish alcoholic man who only cared about money and not his family. Under the influence of alcohol, he harms Sumati and causes her to miscarry. It is also revealed that Pratap was the one who asked Saudamini to bind the Jalsa with tantra after he committed suicide there.

20 years ago, Niyati was born weaker than Kanchan, so she was shifted to a different hospital for intensive care. The hospital Sunaina and Kanchan were in caught fire but Saudamini saved her sister and niece. Prithvi was under the impression that Sunaina is dead, so he decides to adopt Niyati as he and Sumati had also lost their child. Prithvi tells Sumati that Niyati is his illegitimate child instead of Pratap's daughter because Sumati would not have accepted her baby's killer's child. After learning the truth, the Khanna family is split with people who refuse to accept Niyati (mama, mami, Kartik, Mansi and Sumati) and people who do (dadi, nani and Prithvi).

While Prithvi raised Niyati with love and support, Saudamini led Kanchan down the path of revenge, which Sunaina did not agree with. Once Kanchan is older, she joins an architecture company who is building Jalsa so she could get Saudamini to perform tantra on the house. After revealing everything, Saudamini and Kanchan try to instigate Niyati against the Khanna's, but Niyati refuses to join hands with them. Saudamini tries to kill Niyati so she won't be a hindrance to their plan, but inspector Bharat saves Niyati. However, he gets fatally shot by Saudamini. Kanchan ends up shooting Niyati twice and runs away with Saudamini when Akshat comes to her rescue. Unfortunately, Niyati falls off a cliff, into the lake below, and Akshat jumps after her to save her, but he is unable to find her. Niyati is rescued by a tantric instead and taken to a tantra temple.

Niyati chooses to support Prithvi and along with Akshat, who she later marries, they vow to stand up against the evil forces and protect them from the looming dangers of black magic. Kanchan also captures Akshat's soul in order to ruin Niyati's married life. But at the end, Niyati saves Akshat by releasing his soul from soul world. Kanchan also controls Khanna family against her by performing black magic on them with the help of an actress in the form of sage. But she fails and dies at the end. Niyati, Akshat and her family lives happily ever after.

== Cast ==
=== Main ===
- Sargun Kaur Luthra as Niyati Aneja Khanna Kapoor: Sunaina and Pratap's daughter; Sumati and Prithvi's adoptive daughter; Kanchan's sister; Nirvaan's cousin sister; Akshat's wife (2018–2019)
- Gautam Vig as Akshat Roy Kapoor: Niyati's best friend turned husband (2018–2019)

=== Recurring ===
- Juhi Parmar as Sumati Solanki Khanna: Rukmati's daughter; Prithvi's wife; Nirvaan's mother; Niyati's adoptive mother; Niyati and Kanchan's Chachi (2018–2019)
- Manish Goel as Prithvi Raj Khanna: Aradhana's son; Pratap's brother; Nirvaan's father; Niyati's adoptive father; Niyati and Kanchan's uncle (2018–2019)
- Sameksha as Saudamini Nigam: Sunaina's sister; Niyati and Kanchan's aunt; Nisha's fake mother (2018–2019)
- Amandeep Sidhu as Kanchan Khanna: Pratap and Sunaina's daughter; Niyati's sister (2018-2019)
- Kanan Malhotra as Nirvaan Khanna: Sumati and Prithvi's son; Parth's brother; Kartik, Mansi, Niyati and Kanchan's cousin brother; Nisha's former fiancé (2018–2019)
- Hiten Tejwani as Inspector Bharat Singh Rathod (2018–2019)
- Rohit Khurana as Dr. Daksh Mehra (2019)
- Harsh Vashisht as Ashutosh Shukla
- Munisha Khatwani as Munisha
- Farida Dadi as Aradhana Devi Khanna: Pratap and Prithvi's mother; Niyati, Nirvaan, Parth and Kanchan's grandmother
- Nayan Bhatt as Rukmati Devi Solanki: Sumati's mother; Nirvaan, Parth, Kartik and Mansi's grandmother
- Gauri Tonk as Sunaina Khanna: Pratap's wife; Niyati and Kanchan's mother
- Gurpreet Singh as Pratap Khanna: Prithvi's brother; Sunaina's husband; Niyati and Kanchan's father
- Garima Jain as Nisha: Saudamini's fake daughter; Nirvaan's former fiancée
- Ved Thappar as Aghori Baba
- Sujay Reu as Kartik
- Vaidehi Nair as Mansi
- Meghan Jadhav as Parth
- Monika Shilpkar as Geeta, the housemaid and Mohan's wife
