= Jai Deva Shree Ganesha =

Indian mythological television series

- Also known as: Jai Deva Shri Ganesha
- Genre: Hindu mythology
- Created by: Siddharth Kumar Tewary
- Developed by: Siddharth Kumar Tewary
- Written by: Mihir Bhuta; Medha Jadhav; Amol Surve
- Directed by: Jai Prakash Sharma; Kiran Gorde
- Creative director: Abhishek Sarkar
- Starring: See below
- Country of origin: India
- Original language: Marathi
- No. of episodes: 11

Production
- Executive producers: Abhijit Khade; Narendra Mudholkar
- Producers: Siddharth Kumar Tewary; Gayatri Gill Tewary; Rahul Kumar Tiwary
- Production locations: Umargam, Gujarat
- Cinematography: Sanjay Mishra
- Camera setup: Multi-camera
- Running time: 45 minutes
- Production company: Swastik Productions

Original release
- Network: Star Pravah
- Release: August 22 – September 1, 2020

Jai Deva Shree Ganesha is a Hindu mythological Marathi television serial that aired on Star Pravah. The show launched on the special occasion of Ganeshotsav 2020.

The show was produced by Swastik Productions. It premiered on 22 August 2020 and went off air on 1 September 2020. The show was a limited series with only 11 episodes.

== Plot ==
The show explains the stories behind the birth of Ganesha to the curse given to Chandra Dev. The series also shows the competition held between Kartikeya and Ganesha, and the wedding ceremony of Vinayaka with Riddhi and Siddhi.

== Cast ==
=== Main ===
- Adwait Kulkarni as Ganesha
  - Ajinkya Thakur as older Ganesha
- Bhagyashree Mote as Devi Parvati
- Pankaj Vishnu as Shiva

=== Recurring ===
- Divesh Medge as younger Kartikeya
  - Rushiraj Pawar as older Kartikeya
- Tushar Kawale as Vishnu
- Anuja Choudhary as Lakshmi
- Vedant Ranade as Brahma
- Vaidehee Sawant as Saraswati
- Akshay Milind Dandekar as Nandi
- Tanmaya Katvi as Indra
- Suhrud Wardekar as Chandra
- Aayushree Sangle as Siddhi
  - Mayuri Kapadane as older Siddhi
- Ketki Kulkarni as Riddhi
  - Saili Dhurve as older Riddhi
- Akanksha Pingale as Devasena
  - Rutuja Limaye as older Devasena
- Vipin Borate as Rishi Parashara
- Prayag as Bhringi Maharaj
- Sumedh Mudgalkar as Krishna

== Production ==
The series was broadcast during the 11 days of Ganeshotsav 2020. Its producer was Siddharth Kumar Tewary, who was associated with the series Mahabharat and RadhaKrishn. A grand set was made for the series in Umargam. Sumedh Mudgalkar who played the role of Krishna in Swastik's famous show RadhaKrishn, reprised his role in this series.
