= Sameksha =

Indian actress

Samiksha Oswal
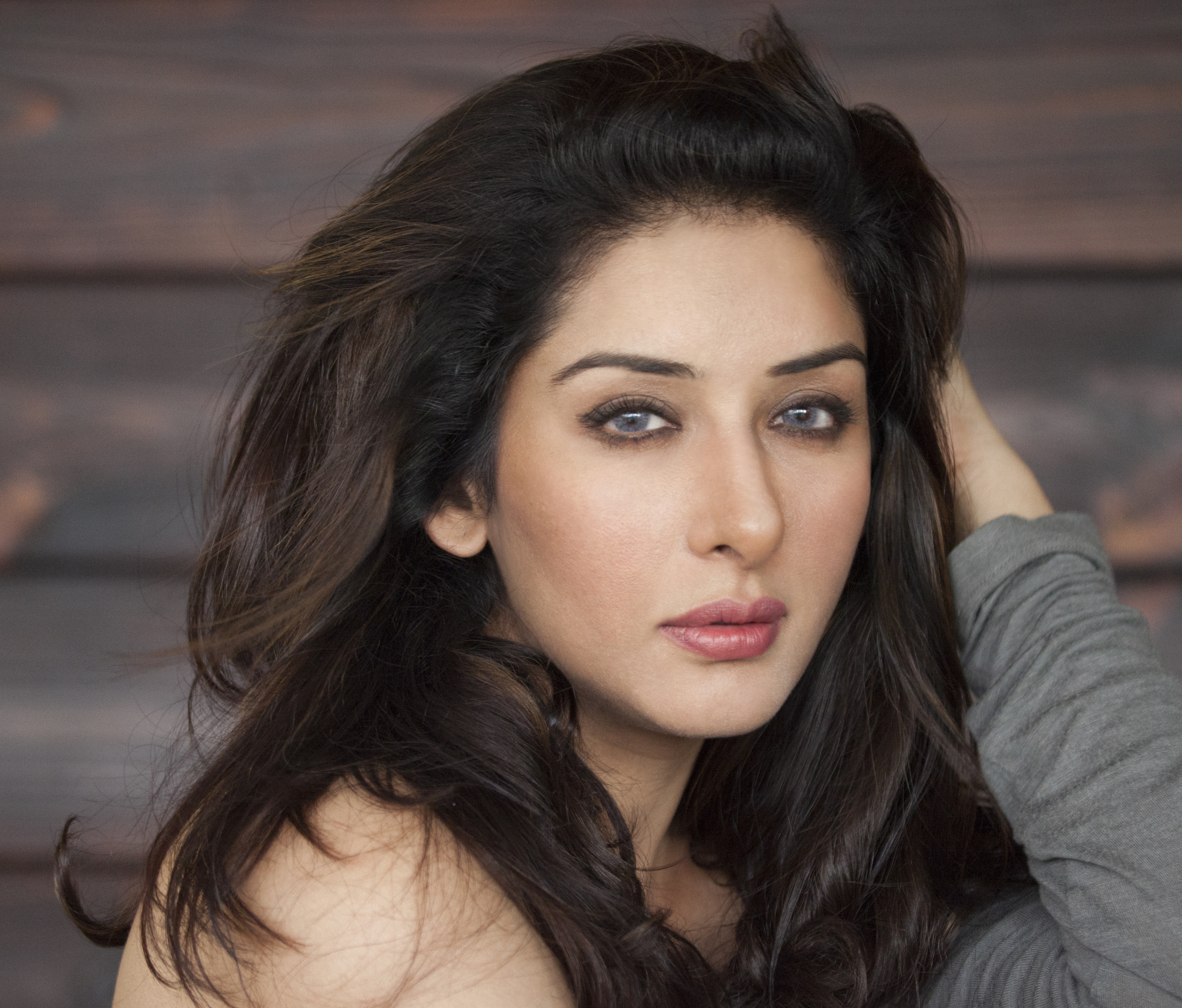
- Sameksha in 2017
- Born: Samiksha Singh; 8 October 1985 (age 40); Chandigarh, India
- Occupations: Actress; film director; film producer
- Years active: 2004–present
- Spouse: Shael Oswal (m. 2020)
- Website: ssoproductions.com

Samiksha Singh (born 8 October 1985), known mononoymously as Sameksha, is an Indian film and television actress. She has played a range of characters in various series and films, in multiple languages including Tamil, Telugu, Punjabi, Hindi and Kannada. She has directed multiple music videos and films.

== Personal life ==
Sameksha is a Punjabi and she was born on 8 October 1985 in Chandigarh. Sameksha later relocated to Mumbai to pursue a career in acting and eventually became a director and a producer at SSO Production.

In July 2020, Sameksha married singer Shael Oswal in Singapore.

== Career ==
Sameksha made her debut in the film industry when director Puri Jagannadh cast her as the lead in the 2004 Telugu film 143. Months later, she subsequently appeared in the 2005 Tamil film Arinthum Ariyamalum, where she starred opposite Navdeep and Arya.

Sameksha earned further success with the 2014 drama Fateh, following which she was awarded the Balraj Sahni Honour Award for contributions to Punjabi cinema. Sameksha's role in Vaapsi (2016) was critically acclaimed in various film festivals.

Sameksha, alongside film work, made her television debut on Sahara One's Zaara – Pyaar ki Saugat, in the titular role. She also played a parallel lead role in the long-running soap opera Yahaaan Main Ghar Ghar Kheli on Zee TV. She also portrayed the role of Roshni in the crime thriller Arjun on Star Plus, followed by a stint in the political thriller, P.O.W.- Bandi Yuddh Ke.

From 2017 to 2018, she portrayed Olympias in Sony TV's historical drama Porus opposite an ensemble cast of Laksh Lalwani, Rohit Purohit and Rati Pandey.

In 2018, she played Parminder in the Star Plus sitcom Khichdi Returns. From 2018 to 2019, she played Saudamini in Colors TV's Tantra.

In 2022, she along with her husband, Shael Oswal, produced the film Max, Min and Meowzaki under their production house - SSO Productions.

== Filmography ==
=== Films ===
Year	Film	Role	Language	Notes
2004	143	Sanjana	Telugu	
2005	Arinthum Ariyamalum	Sandhya	Tamil	
2006	Mercury Pookkal	Nisha	Tamil	
2006	Manathodu Mazhaikalam	Sruthi	Tamil	
2006	Madana	Urvashi	Kannada	
2007	Mr. Hot Mr. Kool	Dolly	Hindi	
2007	Murugaa		Tamil	Special appearance
2007	Kotha Katha		Telugu	
2007	Thee Nagar		Tamil	Special appearance
2008	Idi Sangathi	Item number	Telugu	
2008	Panchamirtham	Mandakini	Tamil	
2008	Brahmanandam Drama Company	Soni	Telugu	
2009	Maruti Mera Dost	Mrs. Singh	Hindi	
2009	Samrajyam	Saroja	Telugu	Bilingual film
2009	Karthikai	Saroja	Tamil	Bilingual film
2011	Dhada	Preethi	Telugu	
2012	Kulumanali		Telugu	
2013	Jatts In Golmaal	Raavi	Punjabi	
2013	Lucky Di Unlucky Story	Sheffy	Punjabi	
2014	Fateh	Sehaj Sandhu	Punjabi	
2014	Kirpaan	Seerat	Punjabi	
2016	Vaapsi	Jeetan	Punjabi	
2019	Pranaam	Manjri	Hindi	
2022	Max, Min & Meowzaki	Producer	Hindi	
2024	Sucha Soorma	Balbiro	Punjabi	

=== Television ===
Year	Show	Role
2018–2019	Tantra	Saudamini
2018	Khichdi	Parminder
2018	21 Sarfarosh - Saragarhi 1897	Jeevani "Sohni" Kaur
2017–2018	Porus	Olympias
2017	Sarabhai vs Sarabhai	Ms.Pochkhanwala
2016–2017	P.O.W.- Bandi Yuddh Ke	Indira Jaisingh
2015	Badi Dooooor Se Aaye Hai	Toffee Raheja
2015	SuperCops Vs SuperVillains	Queen Mrignaynee/Layla
2012	Arjun	Roshni Rawte
2009	Yahaaan Main Ghar Ghar Kheli	Nilanjana Roy
2006–2007	Zaara	Zaara Khan
