= Veer Hanuman =

- Genre: Mythological
- Created by: Swastik Productions
- Directed by: Loknath Pandey
- Starring: Aan Tiwari; Arav Chowdharry; Sayli Salunkhe; Mahir Pandhi; Nimai Bali; Tarun Khanna; Malhar Pandya; Meer Ali; Bheemraj Malaji
- Country of origin: India
- Original language: Hindi
- No. of episodes: 156

Production
- Producers: Siddharth Kumar Tewary; Gayatri Gill Tewary
- Camera setup: Multi-camera
- Running time: 22 minutes
- Production company: Swastik Productions

Original release
- Network: Sony SAB; SonyLIV
- Release: 11 March – 8 September 2025

Veer Hanuman, also known as Veer Hanuman – Bolo Bajrang Bali Ki Jai, is an Indian Hindi-language mythological television series aired from 11 March 2025 to 8 September 2025 on Sony SAB. The show is produced by Siddharth Kumar Tewary under Swastik Productions.

== Premise ==
The series chronicles the journey of Lord Hanuman from his childhood as Maruti to becoming a symbol of unwavering devotion and supernatural strength. Set in the mythical kingdom of Kishkindha, the story follows young Maruti as he gradually uncovers his divine identity. Guided by his parents and spiritual mentors, he embarks on a journey that brings him into contact with various deities and key figures from Hindu mythology. The show emphasizes Hanuman’s internal evolution, focusing on devotion, humility, valor, and the virtues that make him the ideal devotee of Lord Rama.

== Cast ==
=== Main ===
- Aan Tiwari as young Hanuman (Maruti)
- Arav Chowdharry as Kesari, Hanuman’s father
- Sayli Salunkhe as Anjana, Hanuman’s mother

=== Recurring ===
- Mahir Pandhi as Bali and Sugreev (dual role)
- Tanmay Rishi Shah as Rama
- Dhaniksh Dadhich as Lakshmana
- Shaurya Upadhyay as Bharata
- Shabd Grover as Shatrughna
- Nimai Bali as Rikshraj
- Govind Namdev as Brahma
- Priyanshi Raghuwanshi as Saraswati
- Himanshu Soni as Vishnu
- Sakshi Khandal as Lakshmi
- Abhilash Chaudhary as Ravana
- Tarun Khanna as Shiva/Mahakaal
- Aishwarya Raj Bhakuni as Parvati/Kali
- Sarthak Dayma as Ganesha
- Malhar Pandya as Surya
- Siyaa Patil as Sandhya/Chhaya (dual role)
- Rushiraj Pawar as Shani
- Meer Ali as Indra
- Saurabh Kaushik as Rahu
- Kunal Bakshi as Pawan
- Kritik Yadav as Agni
- Sandeep Singh as Varuna
- MM Rishi as Chandra
- Bheemraj Malaji as Jatayu
- Sumit Sadan as Jambavana
- Javed Pathan as Mayavi
- Dinesh Mehta as Ahiravan
- Manish Bishla as Dadimukha
- Riya Sharma as Ruma
- Alhaan Shaikh as Nala
- Mukund Jain as Nila
- Gurpreet Kaur as Kaushalya
- Hunar Hali as Kaikeyi
- Ruchi RK Kaushal as Sumitra
- Kala Nayak as Manthara
- Anila Kharbanda as Tataka
- Vineet Asthana as Subahu
- Deblina Chatterjee as Raakha

== Production ==
Veer Hanuman is produced by Swastik Productions, known for their previous mythological dramas such as Mahabharat and RadhaKrishn. The show is filmed primarily in Mumbai, using expansive sets that replicate the architectural styles of ancient India. The design team drew inspiration from the cave art of Ajanta and Ellora to reflect historical accuracy in costumes and settings. The series incorporates advanced VFX and CGI technology to depict divine miracles and supernatural battles, aiming to offer a visually immersive experience. The show was promoted using 3D holographic sky projection technology in Ujjain during Mahashivratri as part of a promotional campaign by Sony SAB. This projection used scrim technology to create a 360-degree visual experience of Lord Hanuman.

== Reception ==
Critics appreciated the show’s spiritual tone and its effort to present the epic’s stories to a modern audience with fresh.
