= Nethra (TV series) =

Indian Telugu language soap opera

- Genre: Supernatural; Fantasy; Drama
- Written by: Dialogues; Malathi Nethaji
- Screenplay by: Anand Goradia
- Story by: Mahesh Pandey
- Directed by: Ramnarayan Uragonda
- Creative directors: Amol Arvind Surve; Sanjay Ghosh; Sonia Bansal
- Starring: Shivani Tomar; Prem Jacob; Bharadwaj
- Theme music composer: Sushant Pawar
- Opening theme: "Mullokaalekore Janme needi"
- Composer: Manoj Sharma
- Country of origin: India
- Original language: Telugu
- No. of seasons: 1
- No. of episodes: 126

Production
- Executive producer: Nilesh Gundel
- Producers: Siddharth Kumar Tewary; Gayathri Gill Tewary; Rahul Kumar Tewary
- Production location: Mumbai
- Cinematography: Murali Mohan Chegu
- Animators: Raj Studios; One Life Studios
- Editors: Satish Kulakarni; Medisetty Sandeep; Paladagu Mahidhar; Akhilesh Aareti
- Camera setup: Multi-camera
- Running time: 20-22 minutes
- Production companies: Sun Entertainment; Swastik Productions

Original release
- Network: Gemini TV
- Release: 10 October 2022 – 4 March 2023

Nethra is an Indian Telugu language Supernatural fiction television series aired on GeminiTV from 10 October 2022 to 4 March 2023. The show stars Sudipta Benarjee and Shivani Tomar in title role and Prem Jacob and Bharadwaj in pivotal roles.

== Plot ==
The story of Love Vs Revenge where it's continuing since 6 births to the present 7th birth. Nethra is a naagini who's chosen by Mahadeva to protect and maintain the survival of humanity. For that, all the powers to preserve peace for the whole world were stored in the Naagamani for her but only can obtain the gem by marrying a normal human. The gem also only appears every 21 years at Tripura Pournami where she should be with her partner to obtain it. She chose Arjun over Asura ( Karan) which made him outraged to achieve that gem at any costs to hail the world. This is birth by birth story where Karan in every birth keeps getting in the way for Nethra and Arjun's love and trying to obtain the Naagamani for his selfish reasons. In the present day at 7th birth, will Nethra be able to win Arjun's love after their marriage and can they both protect the Naagamani against Karan forms the rest of the story.

== Cast ==
- Sudipta Benarjee / Shivani Tomar as Nethra, Istaroopadhari Naagini
- Prem Jacob as Arjun, Nethra's husband
- Bharadwaj as Karan Rayapati
- Radha Krishna as Rajasekhar Rayapati, great business man and Karan's father
- Jyothi Reddy as Pushpa, Karan's mother
- Chinna as Narayana Rao, Nethra's Father
- Durga devi as Saraswathi, Nethra's mother
- Annapurna Vitthal as Old lady who in lives Lord Siva temple
- Krishnaveni as Karan's grand mother
- Chakri as Karan's uncle and Krishnaveni's husband
- Anju Asrani as Krishnaveni, Karan's aunt
- Priya Tarun as Jhansi, Karan's Aunt
- Akella Gopala Krishna as Jhansi's husband
- Anuradha as Ashmitha, Karan's cousin sister
- Sravani Yadav as Sona, Karan's sister
- Abhiram as Amar, Karan's cousin brother
- Poorna Sai Kumar as Vishwak, Karan's cousin brother

== Dubbed versions ==
List of dubbed versions of Nethra
Language	Title	Original release	Network(s)	Last aired	Ref.
Bengali	Sunetra	14 November 2022	Sun Bangla	26 March 2023	
Malayalam	Nethra	28 November 2022	Surya TV	8 April 2023	
Tamil	Nethra	4 December 2022	Sun TV	26 February 2023	
Kannada	Nagashree	5 December 2022	Udaya TV	29 April 2023	
Tamil	Nethra	6 March 2023	Sun TV	27 August 2023	
Marathi	Netra	13 March 2023	Sun Marathi	5 August 2023	
