= Swastik Productions =

Indian production company

- Type: Private
- Industry: Entertainment
- Founded: 2007; 19 years ago
- Founder: Siddharth Kumar Tewary
- Headquarters: Mumbai, Maharashtra, India
- Key people: Siddharth Kumar Tewary (Founder); Gayatri Gill Tewary (Producer & fiction head); Rahul Kumar Tewary
- Products: Television Programs
- Website: swastikproductions.com

Swastik Stories Pvt. Ltd. is an Indian television production company founded by Siddharth Kumar Tewary in 2007. The company is known for producing television series based on Indian mythology and historical narratives. Its productions include Mahabharat, Shiv Shakti, RadhaKrishn, Porus, and Shrimad Ramayan. Swastik Productions also operates a 25-acre production facility known as Swastik Bhoomi.

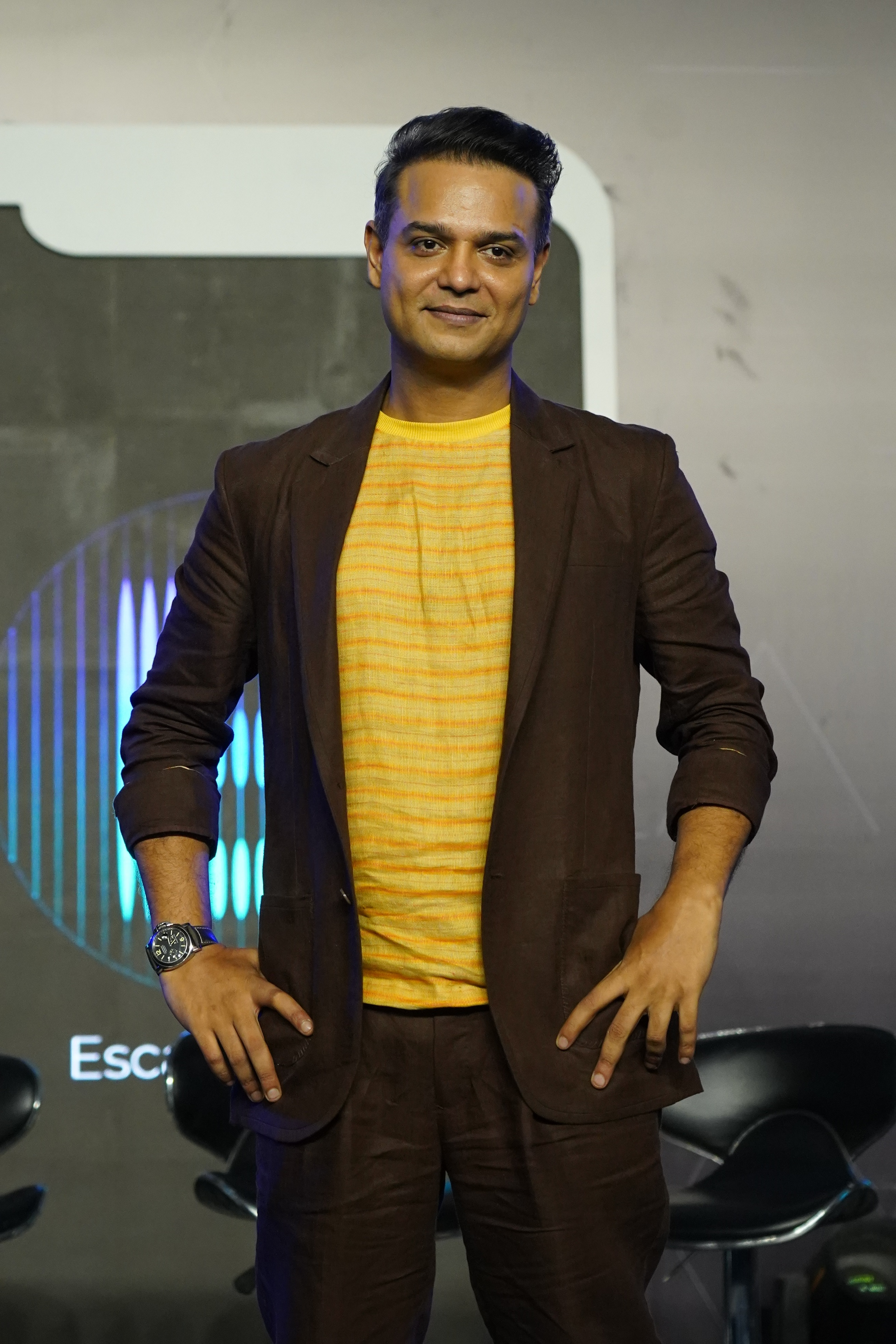
Siddharth Kumar Tewary, founder of Swastik Production.

== Former productions ==
Year	Series	Channel	Ref(s)
2007–2008	Amber Dhara	Sony Entertainment Television	
2008–2011	Mata Ki Chowki	Sahara One	
2008	Saas v/s Bahu	Sahara One	
2009	Hindi Hai Hum	Real TV	
2009–2011	Agle Janam Mohe Bitiya Hi Kijo	Zee TV	
2010	Maan Rahe Tera Pitaah	Sony Entertainment Television	
2011–2012	Navya	Star Plus	
2011–2012	Gyan Guru	Imagine TV	
2011–2012	Phulwa	Colors TV	
2011–2012	Shobha Somnath Ki	Zee TV	
2013	Amita Ka Amit	Sony Entertainment Television	
2013–2014	Mahabharat	Star Plus	
2014–2015	Bandhan	Zee TV	
2015	Razia Sultan	&TV	
2015	Dosti... Yaariyan... Manmarziyan	Star Plus	
2014–2016	Yam Hain Hum	Sony SAB	
2015–2016	Suryaputra Karn	Sony Entertainment Television	
2015–2016	Begusarai	&TV	
2016–2017	Baal Krishna	BIG Magic	
2016–2018	Karmaphal Daata Shani	Colors TV	
2017	Shankar Jaikishan 3 in 1	Sony SAB	
2017–2018	Mahakali – Anth Hi Aarambh Hai	Colors TV	
2017–2018	Porus	Sony Entertainment Television	
2018–2019	Chandragupta Maurya	Sony Entertainment Television	
2018–2023	RadhaKrishn	Star Bharat	
2018–2019	Tantra	Colors TV	
2019–2020	Ram Siya Ke Luv Kush	Colors TV	
2020	Jai Deva Shree Ganesha	Star Pravah	
2020	Devi Adi Parashakti	Dangal TV	
2021–2022	Jai Kanhaiya Lal Ki	Star Bharat	
2022–2023	Nethra	Gemini TV	
2022–2023	Dheere Dheere Se	Star Bharat	
2023	Hum Rahein Na Rahein Hum	Sony Entertainment Television	
2023–2024	Chand Jalne Laga	Colors TV	
2023–2024	Vanshaj	Sony SAB	
2023-2025	Shiv Shakti – Tap Tyaag Tandav	Colors TV	
2024	Lakshmi Narayan – Sukh Samarthya Santulan	Colors TV	
2024–2025	Shrimad Ramayan	Sony Entertainment Television & Sony SAB	
2025	Veer Hanuman - Bolo Bajrang Bali Ki Jai	Sony SAB	
2025	Tu Dhadkan Main Dil	Star Plus	
