= Tarun Khanna (actor) =

Indian television and film actor

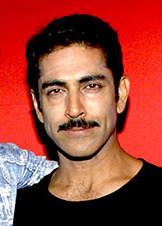
- Occupations: Model; actor
- Years active: 2001–present
- Spouse: Smriti Mohan (m. 2012)

Tarun Khanna is an Indian television and film actor who works in Hindi and Punjabi films.

== Personal life ==
Khanna is married to fellow television actress Smriti Khanna (née Mohan). They have a son who was born in 2014.

=== Media ===
Moving almost entirely to taking up roles in mythological and fantasy shows, in an interview in 2013 Khanna admitted to finding daily soaps "stupid and badly written". In a 2015 interview, he repeated that there was a need for better writing in Indian television.

== Filmography ==
=== Films ===
Year	Title	Role	Language	Notes
2010	Mar Jawan Gur Khake	Rocky	Punjabi	
2012	Pata Nahi Rabb Kehdeyan Rangan Ch Raazi	Harman Singh	Punjabi	
2013	Pooja Kiven AA		Punjabi	
2016	Dishoom	Inspector Saeed	Hindi	
2017	Mukkadarpur Ka Majnu	Love Guru J C Baba	Hindi	Released
2025	Akhanda 2	Lord Shiva	Telugu	Released

== Television ==
Year	Serial	Role	Notes
2001–2003	Kabhi Aaye Na Judaai	Sameer	
2003	Saara Akaash	Sikandar (Blue Fox) / Varun Saxena	
2003–2004	Kasautii Zindagii Kay	Praveen Sengupta	
2004 2004–2005	Kittie PartyGuns & Roses	Narang	Episode 4 onwards
2005	Kohinoor	Rakesh Mehra	
2005	Sarkarr:Rishton Ki Ankahi Kahani		
2005–2006	Kituu Sabb Jaantii Hai	Yuvraaj	
2006	Pyaar Ke Do Naam: Ek Raadha, Ek Shyaam	Ajay Singh Rathore	
2006–2007	Kuch Apne Kuch Paraye	Aditya Raichand	
2007	Aahat - Anniversary	Deepesh	Episode 4
2007	Kulvaddhu	Advocate Dhanraj Singhania	
2007	Ssshhhh...Phir Koi Hai - Dastakhat	Neeraj	Episode 34
2007	Ssshhhh...Phir Koi Hai - Saaya	Girish Gupta	Episode 41
2007	Bhabhi	Samar Kapoor	
2007	Zaara	D.K.	
2007–2008	Dhak Dhak In Dubai	Rasik Sarabhai	
2008	Ssshhhh...Phir Koi Hai - Goh Peeche Mat Dekhna : Part 1 & Part 2	Kunwar / Ankur	Episodes 74-75
2008–2009	Mata Ki Chowki	Yash Kumar	
2008–2009	Jai shri krishna	God Hanuman	
2009	Ssshhhh...Phir Koi Hai - Qayamat : Part 1 - Part 8	SP Arjun Mehra	Episodes 166-173
2009	Kahaniya Vikram Aur Betaal Ki	King Vikramaditya	
2010	Agnipareeksha Jeevan Ki – Gangaa	Harshvardhan "Mahantji"	
2010	Ek Veer Stree Ki Kahaani – Jhansi Ki Rani	Ali Bahadur	
2011	Adaalat - Qatil Boxer	Tejas Yadav / Arjun Yadav	Episode 14
2011	Chandragupta Maurya	Karvinath	
2011–2012	Shobha Somnath Ki	Dadda Chaulukya	
2012	Rishton Ke Bhanwar Mein Uljhi Niyati	Tarun Khanna	
2012–2013	C.I.D.	Inspector Suraj	
2013	Devon Ke Dev...Mahadev	Ravana	
2013–2014	Rangrasiya	Thakur Param Singh Tejawat	
2014	Mahabharat	Balaram	
2014	Ishq Kills	Randhir	Episode 6
2014	Savdhaan India	Devraj Singh	Episode 664
2014–2015	Adaalat	Advocate Jog	
2015	Neeli Chatri Waale	Bobby's friend	
2015	Bharat Ka Veer Putra – Maharana Pratap	Zahir Saaka	
2015–2016	Police Factory	Shamsher Singh Devgan	
2015–2017	Santoshi Maa	God Shiva	
2016–2018	Karmaphal Daata Shani	God Shiva	
2017	Aarambh	Kayasth	
2018	Paramavatar Shri Krishna	God Shiva	
2018	Mere Sai	Ratnakar Rao	
2018	Porus	Chanakya	
2018–2019	Chandragupta Maurya	Chanakya	
2018–2023	RadhaKrishn	God Shiva	
2018–2023	RadhaKrishn	God Hanuman	
2019	Ram Siya Ke Luv Kush	God Shiva / Parashurama	
2019	Namah	God Shiva	
2020	Devi Adi Parashakti	God Shiva	
2020	Tenali Rama	King Krishnadevaraya	
2021	Vighnaharta Ganesha	Tulsidas	
2021–2022	Jai Kanhaiya Lal Ki	God Shiva/God Hanuman	
2023–2024	Shiv Shakti – Tap Tyaag Tandav	Devraj Indra	
2024–2025	Shrimad Ramayan	God Shiva	
2025	Veer Hanuman – Bolo Bajrang Bali Ki Jai	God Shiva	
2025–	Kaal Bhairav Rakshak Shaktipeeth Ke	God Shiva	captain tv
2025	Mahishashur Mardini	Lord Shiva	captain tv

== Theatre ==
In 2024, Tarun Khanna played Lord Shiva in the play Humare Ram, alongside Ashutosh Rana. The play, produced by Rahul Bhuchar under the banner of Felicity Theatre and directed by Gaurav Bhardwaj, has been staged at venues including the Dubai Opera. In 2026, it is scheduled for an international tour, including performances at the Eventim Apollo in London.
