= Nimai Bali =

Indian television actor

- Born: 21 March 1969 (age 57)
- Occupation: Actor
- Years active: 1993–present
- Spouse: Sahila Chadha (separated)
- Children: Princess Bali (daughter)
- Parent: Rajrani Dutt Bali (mother)
- Relatives: Sunil Dutt (maternal uncle); Sanjay Dutt (maternal cousin); Namrata Dutt (maternal cousin); Priya Dutt (maternal cousin)

Nimai Bali (born 21 March 1969) is an Indian actor who generally plays legendary supporting and villainous roles. He is also famous for his role in the TV series Laado 2.

== Career ==
Bali began his career playing Surya in the TV series Chandrakanta. He went on to play role of Senior Inspector Pratap in the TV series CID: Special Bureau.

Bali is known for portraying Pawan Dev, Emperor Vali and Duryodhana in the 1997-2000 Hindi television serial Jai Hanuman, directed by Sanjay Khan.

He played the role of Lord Vishnu's guard Jaya, and two of Jaya's three asura incarnations, Hiranyakashipu and Ravan in the 2000-2002 Hindi television serial Vishnu Puran.

He again played Duryodhana in Khan's miniseries Jai Mahabharat in 2001, and appeared in the serials Bhabhi, Kumkum - Ek Pyara Sa Bandhan, Doli Saja Ke, Amber Dhara, Woh Rehne Waali Mehlon Ki, Yug and Om Namah Shivay.

Bali played the role of Ravana in Jai Jai Jai Bajrang Bali.

Bali played the role of Inspector Malvade in the Bollywood movie Rahasya, released in January 2015.

He had also appeared in Suryaputra Karn as Drona and Maharaj Kans in Baal Krishna.

He portrayed the role of Ugrapat in the TV serial RadhaKrishn and Shankaracharya in the TV serial Devi Adi Parashakti.

== Personal life ==
Bali is married to actress Sahila Chadha. The couple has a daughter, Princess. He is a cousin of Bollywood star Sanjay Dutt.

His hobbies include cars and martial arts.

== Filmography ==
| Year | Film | Role |
|---|---|---|
| 1993 | Phool Aur Angaar | Vishal |
| 1995 | Dil Ka Doctor | Rikku |
| 2004 | Garv: Pride & Honour | Pappu Kalia |
| 2015 | Rahasya | Inspector Santosh Malvade |
| 2017 | Ghanta Chori Ho Gaya | |
| 2024 | Bikru Kanpur Gangster | Vikas Dubey |
| 2022 | Banchhada - Journey Of A Prostitute | |
| 2023 | Dharmantaran | Guruji |

== Television ==
| Year | Serial | Role | Channel |
|---|---|---|---|
| 1997 | Jai Hanuman | Pawandev | DD National |
| 1998 | Jai Hanuman | Vali | DD National |
| 1998 | Jai Hanuman | Makardhwaj | DD National |
| 1999 | Jai Hanuman | Yuvraj Duryodhan | DD National |
| 2000–2002 | Vishnu Puran | | DD National |
| 2000–2002 | Vishnu Puran | Jaya | DD National |
| 2000–2002 | Vishnu Puran | Hiranyakashipu | DD National |
| 2000–2002 | Vishnu Puran | Ravana | DD National |
| 2003 | Maharathi Karna | Yuvraj Duryodhan | DD National |
| 2005–2006 | CID Special Bureau | Senior Inspector Pratap | Sony Entertainment Television |
| 2007 | Kumkum – Ek Pyara Sa Bandhan | Inspector Satyadev Tipley | Star Plus |
| 2021–2022 | Sirf Tum | Vikrant Oberoi | Colors TV |
| 2023 | Tere Ishq Mein Ghayal | Mayor Kumar Damania | Colors TV |
| 2023–2024 | Ghum Hai Kisikey Pyaar Meiin | Yashwant Bhosle | Star Plus |
| 2024 | Lakshmi Narayan – Sukh Samarthya Santulan | Maharishi Bhrigu | Colors TV |
| 2025 | Shiv Shakti – Tap Tyaag Tandav | Maharishi Shukracharya | Colors TV |
| 2025–2026 | Shehzaadi... Hai Tu Dil Ki | Kailashnath Kothari | Star Plus |
| 2026–present | Jagadhatri | Digvijay Gokhale | Zee TV |

- Laado 2 as Indra Baba Choudhary (Main Male Antagonist) opposite Ananya Khare who plays Malhari Indra Baba Choudhary
- Phir Subah Hogi (2012) as Hukum
- Chupaun Kaise Laga Chunri Mein Daag, 2012
- Chandrakanta as Surya
- Yug as Hajaari
- Betaal Pachisi as Teja
- Gul Sanobar as Jhigala, 1999–2000
- Wanted as Inspector Abhimanyu
- Raavan as Vanara Bali
- Om Namah Shivay as Jalandhar /Sindurasur/ Duryodhan
- Rishton Se Badi Pratha
- C.I.D. as Senior Inspector Pratap
- Bhabhi as Radheshyam
- Doli Saja Ke as Dhananjay Singhania
- Woh Rehne Waali Mehlon Ki as Abhay Parashar
- Jai Jai Jai Bajrang Bali as Ravana
- Mahabharat Katha as Anushalva
- Maa Shakti as Mahishasur
- Bani - Ishq Da Kalma as Balbir Singh Bhullar
- Saath Saath Banayenge Ek Aashiyaan as Ranveer Singh
- Dehleez as Raghuveer
- Jai Mahabharat as Duryodhan
- Balika Vadhu as L.P. Shrivastav
- Suryaputra Karn as Guru Drona
- Shree Ganesh as Tarakasura and Mohasura
- Om Namo Narayan as Adharm (Injustice)
- Baal Krishna as Kans
- Mahakali — Anth Hi Aarambh Hai as Guru Shukracharya
- Porus as Amatya Rakshas
- Chandragupta Maurya as Amatya Rakshas
- Radha Krishn as Ugrapat
- Devi Adi Parashakti as Shukracharya
- Jap Tap Vrat as Shanidev
- Karmaphal Daata Shani as Sage Vishwamitra
- Ghar Sansaar as Mr. Dabla
- Brij Ke Gopal as Sahukaa
- Veer Hanuman - Bolo Bajrang Bali Ki Jai as Riksharaj
