= Shobha Somnath Ki =

Indian historical television drama series

- Genre: Historical drama
- Created by: Vikas Kapoor
- Developed by: Vikas Kapoor
- Written by: Vikas Kapoor
- Screenplay by: Vikas Kapoor; Virendra Singh Patyal
- Starring: Vikramjeet Virk; Ashnoor Kaur
- Theme music composer: Raju Singh
- Opening theme: "Shobha Somnath ki"
- Composers: Raju Singh; Ravindra Jain; Surya Raj Kamal
- Country of origin: India
- Original language: Hindi
- No. of seasons: 1
- No. of episodes: 127

Production
- Producers: Vikas Kapoor (65 Episodes) Vikas Sethi; Siddhart Kumar Tewary
- Cinematography: Deepak Pandey
- Running time: 24 minutes
- Production companies: Candlestick Media; Swastik Pictures

Original release
- Network: Zee TV
- Release: 20 June 2011 – 26 February 2012

Shobha Somnath Ki (English: Shobha of Somnath) is an Indian historical television drama series on Zee TV based on Acharya Chatursen's 1954 Hindi novel Somnath Mahalay. It tells the story of a fictional young female called Shobha amid the infamous raids in western India by Maḥmūd of Ghazni in the early 11th century.

The show replaced another historical drama Jhansi Ki Rani on Zee TV. Initially, the drama was produced by Contiloe Entertainment. However, due to Veer Shivaji on Colors TV and Mahabharat (2013 TV series) on Star Plus, Contiloe Telefilms handed over the reins to Swastik Pictures. The show was shown every day for some months, and was changed to being broadcast bi-weekly due to decreased popularity. Another show Hitler Didi replaced the time slot when Shobha Somnath Ki was shown (starting 7 November 2011). On 12 November 2011, the broadcast time was changed to weekends only. It aired its last episode on 26 February 2012.

== Cast ==
- Vikramjeet Virk as Mahmud of Ghazni
- Srishty Rode as Princess Shobha
- Ashnoor Kaur as Young Princess Shobha
- Tarun Khanna / Yash Tonk as Dadda Chalukya
- Preeti Puri / Amrita Raichand as Gayatri Devi
- Jignesh Mehta as Prince Bheemdev
- Azaan Ali Khan as Young Prince Bheemdev
- Priyanka Chhabra as Princess Chaula
- Navina Bole as Kausar Jahan
- Pankaj Dheer as Kirit Chalukya
- Reshmi Ghosh as Indumati
- Saadhika Randhawa as Indumati
- Avinash Wadhavan as Patan Samrat Vallabhev
- Seema Pandey / Roma Bali as Vijaylaxmi
- Vaquar Shaikh as Puru
- Siddharth Vasudev as Bhaanuman
- Kali Prasad Mukherjee / Sadashiv Amrapurkar as Mahant Rudhrabhadra
- Sudhanshu Pandey as Chandradev
- Shraddha Musale as Bhairavi
- Sonica Handa
- Aarun Nagar as Mantri
- Ahsaas Channa as Loma
- Kannan Arunachalam as Rudrabhadra

== Awards ==
ITA Awards

- 2011: Best Lyricist – Devendra Qafir
- 2011: Best Editing – Paresh Shah
- 2011: Best Costumes – Nidhi Yasha

Zee Rishtey Awards

- 2011: Favourite Khalnayak – Vikramjeet Virk
