= Praneet Menon =

Indian-born American politician

Member-elect of the Vermont House of Representatives from the Orleans-Lamoille district
- Assuming office January 2027
- Succeeding: Michael J. Marcotte

Personal details
- Party: Republican

Praneet Menon is an Indian-born American politician. A member of the Republican Party, he is the member-elect for the Orleans-Lamoille district of the Vermont House of Representatives.
