= Praneet Bhat =

Indian actor

- Occupations: Model; actor; engineer
- Years active: 2004 – present
- Spouses: Kanchan Sharma (m. 2015)

Praneet Bhat is an Indian television actor best known for his role as Shakuni in the epic TV series Mahabharat (2013–2014).

== Early life ==
Bhat is a Kashmiri Pandit and hails from Srinagar. After completing his engineering, he worked with the software company, Wipro.

Bhat shifted to Mumbai in 2002, when he was 22 years old, and started modeling.

== Career ==
He started his television career in 2004 and went on to appear in the television programs Kitni Mast Hai Zindagi, Hotel Kingston, Kituu Sabb Jaantii Hai, Ssshhhh..Phir Koi Hai and Kaajjal.

He played the geeky character Aditya in Geet (2010–2011). He appeared in the role of Shakuni in the mythological saga Mahabharat, which earned him worldwide fame. In September 2014, he became one of the contestants on the eighth season of the reality show Bigg Boss.

He also portrayed a negative role in Star Plus's Rishton Ka Chakravyuh. Bhat then played Darius III in Porus.

From 2018 to 2021, Bhat portrayed a genie, Anguthichhaap, in the show Aladdin - Naam Toh Suna Hoga, and in 2020 he joined Dangal TV's Alif Laila as Jafar. In February 2021, he played Madhusudan in Sony TV's Mere Sai - Shraddha Aur Saburi. From 2021 to 2022, he appeared in &TV's Baal Shiv – Mahadev Ki Andekhi Gatha, where he played Narada.

In 2022, Bhat appeared in an episodic role in Dangal TV's Brij Ke Gopal as Kantak and in Jai Hanuman – Sankatmochan Naam Tiharo as Pret Raj. From 2022 to 2023, he was cast as Amit Shastri in Star Bharat's Dheere Dheere Se. From October 2023 to February 2024, Bhat appeared as Sartaj Sehgal in Colors TV's Chand Jalne Laga.

== Television ==
Year	Show	Role	Ref.	Notes
2004	Kitni Mast Hai Zindagi			
2007	Dill Mill Gayye			
2007	Kaajjal	Bunty		
2008	Arslaan	Shefan		
2010–2011	Geet - Hui Sabse Parayi	Aditya "Adi"		
2012–2013	Suvreen Guggal – Topper of The Year	Jolly		
2013–2014	Mahabharat	Shakuni		
2014	Bigg Boss 8	Contestant		Evicted on Day 91 – 21 December 2014
2015	Razia Sultan	Kasbi Kalandar Lahhori		
2016	Baal Krishna	Nanda Baba		
2017	Trideviyaan	Kilmish		
2017	Peshwa Bajirao	Dandak		
2017–2018	Rishton Ka Chakravyuh	Pujan Singh		
2017–2018	Porus	Darius III		
2018	Meri Hanikarak Biwi	Aghori Baba		
2018–2021	Aladdin - Naam Toh Suna Hoga	Genie of Ring, Anguthichhaap		
2020	Alif Laila	Magician Jafar		Episodic role
2021	Mere Sai	Madhusudan		
2021–2022	Baal Shiv – Mahadev Ki Andekhi Gatha	Devrishi Narada		
2022	Brij Ke Gopal	Kantak		Episodic role
2022	Jai Hanuman - Sankat Mochan Naam Tiharo	Pret Raj		Episodic role
2022-2023	Dharm Yoddha Garud	Dattatreya		
2022-2023	Dheere Dheere Se	Amit Shastri		
2023–2024	Vanshaj	Yogi Singh		
2023–2024	Chand Jalne Laga	Sartaj Sehgal		
2024	Shaitani Rasmein	Janjal Betal		Episodic role
2024–2025	Shrimad Ramayan	Sahastramukh Ravan		
