= Lakshmi Narayan – Sukh Samarthya Santulan =

Indian theological and religious television series

- Genre: Hinduism; Drama
- Created by: Siddharth Kumar Tewary
- Story by: Siddharth Kumar Tewary
- Starring: Shivya Pathania; Srikant Dwivedi
- Country of origin: India
- Original language: Hindi
- No. of seasons: 1
- No. of episodes: 100

Production
- Producers: Gayatri Gil Tewary; Rahul Kumar Tewary
- Camera setup: Multi-camera
- Running time: 20-22 minutes approx
- Production company: Swastik Productions

Original release
- Network: Colors TV
- Release: 22 April – 2 October 2024

Lakshmi Narayan – Sukh Samarthya Santulan is a Hindi-language theological and religious television series that premiered on 22 April 2024 on Colors TV and streams on JioCinema. Produced by Siddharth Kumar Tewary under Swastik Productions, the series stars Shivya Pathania and Srikant Dwivedi. It showcases the eternal love of Lakshmi and Narayana.

== Cast ==
=== Main ===
- Shivya Pathania as Mahalakshmi
  - Also as Shri / AdiLakshmi / Vidya Lakshmi / Vijaya Lakshmi / Veera Lakshmi / Santana Lakshmi / Dhana Lakshmi / Dhanya Lakshmi / Gaja Lakshmi / Narayani / Sindhusuta / Alakshmi / Bhargavi / Kolhapur Mahalakshmi / Varahi / Narasimhi / Kamala / Sita
- Kinjal Pandya as Padmavati
- Shreya Patel as Radha
  - Aaradhya Patel as child Radha
    - Unknown as toddler Radha
- Srikant Dwivedi as Narayana
  - Also as Vishnu / Mahavishnu / Matsya / Hayagriva / Kurma / Venkatesha / Varaha / Narasimha / Vamana / Parashurama / Rama / Krishna
- Shourya Mandoriya as Krishna
  - Also as Giridhara Gopala
  - Hazel Gaur as child Krishna
- Heer Chopra as Mohini

=== Recurring ===
- Kunal Bakshi as Indra
- Anshul Bammi as Shesha
- Tarun Sharma as Garuda
- Unknown as teenage Balarama
  - Aqdas Khan as child Balarama
- Aabhaas Mehta as Jay / Hiranyakashipu
- Amit Pachori as Hayagrivasura
- Puneet Vashisht as Narada
- Unknown as Kamadhenu
- Brownie Parashar as Kashyapa
- Akanksha Rawat as Diti
- Pratik Vohra as Durvasa
- Kamaljeet Rana as Mahabali
- Sandeep Aurora as Svarbhanu / Rahu / Ketu
- Shalini Vishnudev as Saraswati
- Deepak Bhatia as Brahma
- Pradeep Kabra as Madhu
- Bhupindder Bhoopii as Kaitabha
- Ram Yashvardhan as Shiva
- Shravani Goswami as Kadru
- Simran Sachdev as Danu
- Subha Rajput as Parvati
- Ketan Karande as Nandi
- Meer Ali as Chandra
- Manish Bishla as Samudra
- Bhagyashree Nhalve as Jaldevi
- Sam Nagar as Pauloman
- Sudesh Kumar as Bhujang
- Yogesh Mahajan as Shukracharya
- Raja Kapse as Brihaspati
- Vivek Raghuwanshi as Rajkumar Vasu
- Unknown as Kolasura
- Gaurav Sharma as Vijay / Hiranyaksha
- Nimai Bali as Bhrigu
- Preeti Amin as Kavyamata
- Jaydeep Kalsi as Surya
- Keshav Aswani as Agni
- Ishaan Sharma as Varuna
- Vivek Tripathi as Vayu
- Siyaa Patil as Kayadhu
- Tanmoy Shah as Prahlada
- Nazea Hasan Sayed as Aditi
- Garima Verma as Yamuna
- Priyall Ghore as Devaki
- Unknown as Vasudeva
- Rajeev Bharadwaj as Nanda
- Suman Gupta as Yashoda
- Bhavna Rokade as Putana
- Shahbaz Khan as Kansa
- Vineet Asthana as Sakatasura
- Monika Chowdhury as Nandini Cow

== Production ==
Shivya Pathania was cast to play Lakshmi. Srikant Dwivedi was cast to play Lord Narayan. Later, Anshul Bammi join the show as Sheshnaag.

== See also ==
- Shiv Shakti - Tap Tyaag Tandav
