= Maan Rahe Tera Pitaah =

- Written by: Anand Vardhan & Siddharth Tewary
- Directed by: Rajesh Ram Singh
- Creative director: Suleman Qadri & Rukmini Shah
- Starring: See below
- Theme music composer: Dony Hazarika
- Composer: Lalit Sen
- Country of origin: India
- Original language: Hindi
- No. of seasons: 1
- No. of episodes: 50

Production
- Producer: Vikas Seth & Siddharth Tewary
- Camera setup: Multi-camera
- Running time: Approx. 24 minutes
- Production company: Swastik Pictures

Original release
- Network: Sony TV
- Release: 1 June – 26 August 2010

Maan Rahe Tera Pitaah is an Indian television drama series which premiered on Sony TV on 1 June 2010. The story is of a girl named Anmol who fights the society for the respect and honor of her father.

== Cast ==
- Archana Taide ... Anmol
- Gautam Rode... Rajveer
- Nandini Master ... Anmol (Child Artist)
- Pramod Moutho ... Anmol's dad
- Varun Badola ... Kaliprasad (Anmol's uncle who is a MLA)
- Kshitee Jog ... Kaliprasad's wife
- Krip Suri ... Madhav (Kaliprasad's older son)
- Reshmi Ghosh ... Madhav's wife
- Bharat Kaul ... Chief Engineer of the coal mine in Brahampur
- Sulbha Arya ... Dadi (Anmol's grandmother)
