= Chandragupta Maurya (2018 TV series) =

Indian historical drama television series

- Genre: Historical fiction; Drama
- Created by: Siddharth Kumar Tewary
- Screenplay by: Medha Jadhav
- Directed by: J.P. Sharma; Sumit Thakur
- Creative directors: Amol Surve, Abhishek Sarkar
- Starring: Faisal Khan; Kartikey Malviya; Tarun Khanna; Saurabh Raj Jain; Nimai Bali; Vikas Verma; Sneha Wagh
- Composers: Sangeet Haldipur; Siddharth Haldipur; Suryaraj Kamal; Lenin Nandi; Raju Singh
- Country of origin: India
- Original language: Hindi
- No. of seasons: 1
- No. of episodes: 208

Production
- Producers: Gayatri Gill Tewary; Rahul Kumar Tewary; Siddharth Kumar Tewary
- Production locations: Umargam, Gujarat, India
- Editor: Tarun Sunil Babbar
- Camera setup: Multi-camera
- Running time: 20-40 minutes
- Production company: One Life Studios

Original release
- Network: Sony Entertainment Television
- Release: 14 November 2018 – 30 August 2019

Related
- Porus

Chandragupta Maurya is an Indian historical television show that aired on Sony TV from 14 November 2018 to 30 August 2019. Written by Raj Routh, the show is based on the life of Chandragupta Maurya, the first Mauryan emperor and founder of the Maurya Empire. The show is produced by Siddharth Kumar Tewary's One Life Studios.

The show is a seamless continuation of One Life Studio's earlier show Porus.

== Plot ==
The show starts in 323 BCE, immediately after the deaths of the king of the Pauravas, Porus and the Emperor of Macedonia, Alexander the Great. Alexander's general Seleucus Nicator is still in India, having vassalised Ambhiraj (formerly Ambhikumar in the prequel Porus), the King of Takshashila has captured the Paurava Kingdom after assassinating Porus. Chanakya, a Takshashilan Brahmin scholar and the former prime minister of the Paurava Kingdom arrives in Magadha, ruled by the unjust and cruel Nanda emperor Dhana Nanda. He urges him to drive the Macedonians out of India and unite the Mahajanapadas (Indian kingdoms). However, Dhana Nanda openly humiliates Chanakya in the court, mocking his dream of a united India and informs him that it was he who financially helped Seleucus during the assassination of Puru, so that Seleucus will not attack Magadha. This prompts Chanakya to take a vow of eradicating the Nanda dynasty and putting a capable ruler on the throne of Magadha.

Chanakya finds Chandragupta (nicknamed Chandra), a slave who in reality is the crown prince of Piplivan, a kingdom which was destroyed by Dhana Nanda, and sees in him the talent to become a ruler. Meanwhile Dhana Nanda (unaware of Chandra's lineage), also recognises his aptitude and appoints him as the bodyguard of his beloved younger sister, Durdhara. Gradually, Durdhara develops a liking for Chandragupta. With the help of the former soldiers of Piplivan and the king of the janapada (Indian kingdom) Assaka, Vajrabahu, Chandra forms a small army. Chandragupta faces Dhana Nanda in a series of encounters and kills his elder brother Govishanka and commander-in-chief, Bhadrasaal. However, due to the betrayal of Vajrabahu (who later loses both his life and kingdom to Dhana Nanda) he is eventually badly defeated and forced to flee from Magadha. Before being defeated, Chandra managed to inform Durdhara that her father Mahapadma Nanda was killed by Dhana Nanda after the former urged the latter to give a part of his empire to each of his seven brothers. This totally estranges her from Dhana Nanda. Chandra and Chanakya arrive in Takshashila to seek the help of Seleucus. However, Ambhiraj manipulates Seleucus against them and they are thrown into a pit.

=== 5 years later ===
To prove to Durdhara that he is a worthy successor to his father, Dhana Nanda conquers 13 Mahajanapadas, and now turns towards the last remaining janapada, Takshashila. Chandra comes out of the pit, along with Chanakya and other people who had been trapped in the pit earlier, including Porus' son Malayketu. Dhana Nanda faces the combined Macedonian and Takshashilan armies in an indecisive battle but eventually a peace treaty is signed according to which Dhana Nanda is promised the Paurava Kingdom. With the help of Chanakya and Malayketu, Chandra unites the Macedonian and Paurava armies which defeat the Magadhan and Takshashilan armies, killing Ambhiraj and forcing Dhana Nanda to flee to Magadha. Later he uses the Paurava and Takshashilan armies to force Seleucus to retreat as well, thus capturing Takshashila and the Paurava Kingdom (where Malayketu is enthroned). Durdhara and Chandra fall in love with each other and later marry.

Chandra faces Dhana Nanda (and later Seleucus who re-allies with Dhana Nanda to take revenge from Chandragupta) in a series of confrontations and eventually manages to kill Dhana Nanda and all his remaining brothers, thus eradicating the Nanda dynasty, and founding the Mauryan Empire. Seleucus is captured but later freed on the condition that his daughter Helena would marry Chandra and he would return all the wealth he stole from India. On the other hand, Chandra also faces heavy losses, with Malayketu (who passed on his kingdom to Chandra) being killed and Durdhara, who before dying gave birth to Chandra's son and successor, Bindusara after being mistakenly poisoned by Dhana Nanda. Dhana Nanda's former prime minister, the Brahmin Rakshasa is spared by Chandra due to the immense knowledge he possesses, and he becomes his prime minister while Chanakya goes on to finish his treatise Arthashastra.

== Cast ==
- Faisal Khan as Chandragupta Maurya (nicknamed Chandra): Chandravardhan and Mura's son, Durdhara's husband, Bindusara's father. Crown prince and later King of Piplivan, later first Emperor of the Mauryan Empire. Based on Chandragupta Maurya.
  - Kartikey Malviya as young Chandragupta Maurya.
- Tarun Khanna as Vishnugupta Chanakya (alias Kautilya): A Brahmin scholar from Takshashila and the former Prime Minister of the Paurava Kingdom. Chandragupta's mentor and right-hand man. Based on Chanakya.
- Saurabh Raj Jain as Dhana Nanda: Emperor of Magadha. The second youngest of the Nanda siblings, son of Mahapadma Nanda, elder brother of Durdhara, brother-in-law of Chandragupta, and Tarini's husband. Based on Dhana Nanda.
- Aditi Sanwal as Durdhara: The youngest Nanda sibling, daughter of Mahapadma Nanda, younger sister of Dhana Nanda, Chandragupta's wife and Bindusara's mother. Formerly Princess of Magadha; Queen of Piplivan, and Empress of the Maurya Empire. Based on Durdhara.
  - Pranali Ghogare as Young Durdhara.
- Sneha Wagh as Moora, former queen of Piplivan, Chandragupta's mother.
- Nimai Bali as Rakshasa, Prime Minister of the Nanda Empire and later the Maurya Empire.
- Dinesh Mehta as Pandup, Dhana Nanda's elder brother, Prince, Minister of Finance, and formerly Emperor of Magadha.
- Vinit Kakar as Kaivarta, Dhana Nanda's elder brother, Prince, Minister of Defense, and formerly Emperor of Magadha.
- Munendra Singh Kushwah as Pandugati, Dhana Nanda's elder brother, prince, Minister of Agriculture, and formerly Emperor of Magadha.
- Raman Thukral as Malayketu, the son of the Paurava King Purushottam and Queen Laachhi, long-lost crown prince and later king of the Paurava Kingdom.
- Unknown as Rudradev Singh, the commander-in-chief and governor of Paurava Kingdom
- Pragati Mehra as Dai Maa, Dhana Nanda and his siblings' foster mother, Bhadrasaal and Shipra's mother.
- Sujeet Kumar as Bhairava, main student of Chanakya.
- Vishal Nayak as Chandravardhan Maurya, former king of Piplivan, Chandragupta's father.
- Vikas Verma as Seleucus I Nicator, Alexander the Great's former General, first emperor of the Seleucid Empire.
- Kaivalya Chheda as Sthoolbhadra (nicknamed Sthool), close friend, aide and general of Chandragupta.
  - Shayank Shukla as young Sthoolbhadra.
- Barkha Sengupta as Tarini, Dhana Nanda's love interest, wife and empress of Magadha.
- Kamaljeet Rana as Bhadrasaal, commander-in-chief of the Magadha army, brother of Shipra and foster-brother of Dhana Nanda and his siblings.
- Atharv Padhye as Dhoomketu, close friend and aide of Chandragupta.
- Harsh Mehta as Indrajanik, close friend and aide of Chandragupta.
- Ankur Nayyar as Ambhiraj, king of Takshashila.
- Rohit Chandel as Ambhikumar, Ambhiraj's son, crown prince of Takshashila.
- Vivek Vallah as the royal priest of the Paurava Kingdom.
- Brownie Parashar as Mahapadma Nanda, former emperor of Magadha, father of Dhana Nanda, Durdhara and their 7 elder brothers.
- Sumbul Touqeer as Shubhada, Sukhdev's daughter and Chandragupta's friend.
- Abhilash Chaudhary as Agnimukh, an expert swordsman, former soldier and later general of the Piplivan Army.
- Devesh Sharma as Martand, son and heir of Jagat Jala, the governor of Paraspura, a friend of Chandragupta.
- Yogesh Mahajan as Durgam Daga, younger brother of Jagat Jala.
- Raj Routh as Writer Megasthenes
- Pooja Sharma as River Jhelum, the narrator.
- Laksh Lalwani as Purushottam (nicknamed Puru, called Porus by foreigners), former king of the Pauravas, Malayketu's father. (Shown in trailer and flashbacks only, mentioned)
- Aditya Redij as Bamni, former king of the Pauravas, Porus' father and Malayketu's grandfather. (Shown in flashback only)
- Rati Pandey as Anusuya, former queen of the Pauravas, Porus' mother and Malayketu's grandmother. (Shown in flashback only)

== Reception ==
Writing for Zoom, Anusha Iyengar praised Sourabh Raj Jain's portrayal of Dhana Nanda and, based on the first episode, wrote, "Chandragupta Maurya enjoys a good narration and a brilliant set design. The visuals are appealing and dialogues are even better."
