= Big Magic =

Indian general entertainment TV channel

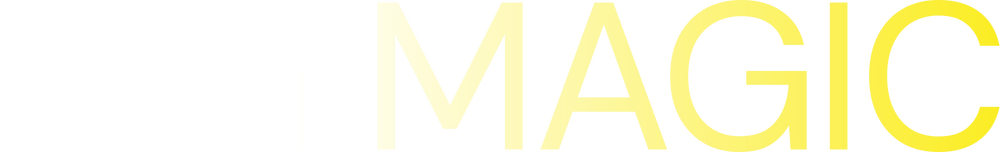
- Logo used since 2025
- Country: India
- Network: Zee Entertainment Enterprises
- Headquarters: Noida

Programming
- Language: Hindi
- Picture format: 1080p HDTV

Ownership
- Owner: Zee Entertainment Enterprises
- Sister channels: See list of channels owned by ZEEL

History
- Launched: 4 April 2011; 15 years ago

Links
- Website: bigmagic.zee5.com

Big Magic is an Indian free-to-air television channel owned by Zee Entertainment Enterprises. The channel was launched on 4 April 2011 as Big Magic by Reliance Broadcasting Network. In 2016, it was acquired by ZEEL.

== History ==
Reliance launched the channel on 4 April 2011, branded in line with its extant radio property Big FM. The network targeted 30% of the national population by narrowing to the three states where Hindi is more spoken (Uttar Pradesh, Madhya Pradesh and Bihar), with the channel being distributed on every cable company in the three states. Within months of launch, Big Magic had become the most-watched channel in the three target states, at a time when all of Reliance Broadcasting Network's channels were seeing a growth in the number of viewers. A Bhojpuri version was launched in 2013, targeting the states of Bihar and Jharkhand. It was acquired in November 2016 by Zee Entertainment Enterprises Limited.
