= Sidharth Bhardwaj =

Indian VJ, model, and actor (born 1987)

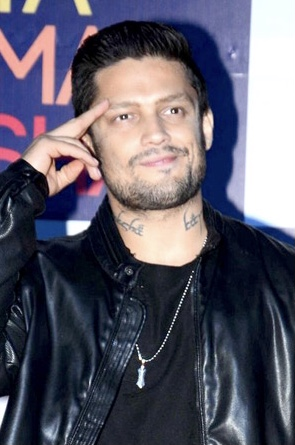
- Bhardwaj in 2017
- Born: 3 March 1987 (age 39); Delhi, India
- Occupations: Actor, Model, MTV VJ
- Family: Deepak Chahar (brother-in-law)

Sidharth Bhardwaj (born 3 March 1987) is a VJ, model, actor and the winner of MTV Splitsvilla 2, a dating television reality show on MTV India. Siddharth won the reality show along with Sakshi Pradhan winning Rs 5,00,000. He was a contestant on the reality show Bigg Boss 5 in 2011 and became the second runner-up.

== Career ==
Bhardwaj started his career in 2009, taking part in MTV Splitsvilla 2 where he emerged as the winner with Sakshi Pradhan. In 2011, he participated in the reality show, Bigg Boss in its fifth season and entered as a wild card entrant. Sidharth survived till the end where he emerged as the second runner up in January 2012. Juhi Parmar emerged as the winner.

In 2014, Bhardwaj made his acting debut in Ekta Kapoor's film Kuku Mathur Ki Jhand Ho Gayi marking his entry in Bollywood. It failed at the box office.

In 2015, Bhardwaj participated in Colors TV's Fear Factor: Khatron Ke Khiladi 6. He is currently based in Los Angeles.

== Television ==
Year	Shows	Role	Notes
2009	MTV Splitsvilla 2	Contestant	Winner
2011–2012	Bigg Boss 5	Contestant	2nd Runner Up
2015	Fear Factor: Khatron Ke Khiladi 6	Contestant	Eliminated Week 3
2016	Box Cricket League Season 2	Contestant	
2026	The 50	Contestant	Eliminated Day 14 33rd place

== Films ==
Year	Film	Role
2014	Kuku Mathur Ki Jhand Ho Gayi	Himanshu
