= Bigg Boss (Hindi TV series) season 5 =

Bigg Boss
- Season 5
- Presented by: Sanjay Dutt; Salman Khan
- No. of days: 98
- No. of housemates: 20
- Winner: Juhi Parmar
- Runner-up: Mahek Chahal
- No. of episodes: 98

Release
- Original network: Colors TV
- Original release: 2 October 2011 – 7 January 2012

Season chronology
- ← Previous; Season 4 Next → Season 6

Bigg Boss 5, also known as Bigg Boss 5: Double Waat or Bigg Boss: Five-five, five-five, five-five!, is the fifth season of the Indian reality TV show Bigg Boss, which aired on Colors TV from 2 October 2011 to 7 January 2012 with Sanjay Dutt and Salman Khan as the hosts.

During the launch on 2 October, fourteen hand-picked housemates entered the house located in Karjat, a town, about halfway between Mumbai and Pune in the Indian state of Maharashtra. Four additional wild card entries were made during the second, third, fourth and the end of sixth week, taking the number of contestants to 18. Three guest entries, who stayed in the house for a couple of days, took the total number of inhabitants to 21. The housemates, considered strangers for each other, spent 98 days (14 weeks) locked out together under the supervision of 55 cameras installed around the house.

The series was won by actress Juhi Parmar on 7 January 2012.

== Opening ==
The opening episode was aired on 2 October 2011 presented by Sanjay Dutt and Salman Khan. The extravagant introductory episode to the season 5 showcased different features of the Bigg Boss house and introduced each of the participant. This season also had majority female contestants. It also featured Bollywood actors Ajay Devgn for the promo of their upcoming film Rascals and Samir Soni for promoting his new serial Parichay on Colors.

== Housemates status ==
Sr	Housemate	Day entered	Day exited	Status
1	Juhi	Day 1	Day 98	Winner
2	Mahek	Day 1	Day 70	Evicted
2	Mahek	Day 84	Day 98	1st runner-up
3	Sidharth	Day 14	Day 98	2nd runner-up
4	Akashdeep	Day 24	Day 98	3rd runner-up
5	Amar	Day 7	Day 98	4th runner-up
6	Pooja M	Day 1	Day 95	Ejected
7	Sunny	Day 43	Day 91	Evicted
8	Shonali	Day 1	Day 77	Evicted
9	Shraddha	Day 1	Day 63	Evicted
10	Pooja B	Day 1	Day 56	Evicted
11	Vida	Day 1	Day 49	Evicted
12	Laxmi	Day 1	Day 42	Evicted
13	Mandeep	Day 1	Day 35	Evicted
14	Shakti	Day 1	Day 28	Evicted
15	Raageshwari	Day 1	Day 21	Evicted
16	Gulabo	Day 1	Day 14	Evicted
17	Sonika	Day 1	Day 8	Walked
18	Nihita	Day 1	Day 7	Evicted

== Housemates ==
The participants in the order of appearance and entry into the house are:

=== Original entrants ===
- Shakti Kapoor – Film actor. He is known for acting in films like Do Waqt Ki Roti, Satte Pe Satta, Musafir and Chup Chup Ke. In 2007, he participated in the dance reality show Nach Baliye 3 with his wife Shivangi Kolhapure.
- Pooja Bedi – Film actress. She is the daughter of actor Kabir Bedi who is known for appearing in films like Vishkanya, Jo Jeeta Wohi Sikandar and Phir Teri Kahani Yaad Aayee. She has participated in reality shows like Jhalak Dikhhla Jaa, Nach Baliye and Fear Factor: Khatron Ke Khiladi.
- Shonali Nagrani – Film actress and model. She is known for acting in films like Rab Ne Bana Di Jodi and Dil Bole Hadippa!. In 2009, she participated in Fear Factor: Khatron Ke Khiladi. Shonali had also took part in Femina Miss India where she emerged as the winner for the 2003 contest and runner-up for the international contest. She later presented IPL for four consecutive years.
- Nihita Biswas – Interpreter. Nihita is married to serial killer Charles Sobhraj. She claimed they got married inside the jail where Charles was convicted. Nihita’s mother – Shakuntala Thapa is Sobhraj’s criminal lawyer.
- Shraddha Sharma – Television actress. She is known for acting in television shows like Suno Har Dil Kuch Kehta Hai and Saarrthi. She was in the news for her relationship with actor Raja Chaudhary and was the reason for the latter's divorce with Shweta Tiwari.
- Mandeep Bevli – News presenter. She is an anchor with Headlines Today, specializing mostly in entertainment related news. Her firecracker wit and personality make her memorable to all she meets.
- Raageshwari Loomba – Singer. She is well known for singing songs like Duniya, Kudi E' Punjab Di and Kal Ki Na Fiqar. She has acted in films like Main Khiladi Tu Anari and Zid. Raageshwari is also a VJ who has presented many MTV shows like Baar Baar Dekho Tum and Ek Do Teen.
- Vida Samadzai – Model. Vida is from Afghanistan known for being the first Afghan woman to participate in an international beauty pageant Miss Earth 2003 since 1974. Her participation in the Miss Earth beauty pageant in 2003 was condemned by the Afghan Supreme Court, saying such a display of the female body goes against Islamic law and Afghan culture. In particular, traditionalists objected to her appearance in a red bikini during the pageant's press presentation.
- Mahek Chahal – Film actress and model. She is known for appearing in item numbers for films like Chameli, Jai Veeru and Yamla Pagla Deewana. She also acted in films like Nayee Padosan, Wanted and Main Aurr Mrs Khanna.
- Sonika Kaliraman – Wrestler. Kaliraman is a professional wrestler and daughter of legendary wrestler Padma Shree, Arjuna Award winner Master Chandgi Ram. She is the first woman Bharat Kesari title-holder and 10 times National Wrestling Champion.
- Pooja Misrra – VJ, model and actress. Pooja is known for presenting B4U's talk show Jab We Met and participating in Big Switch. Pooja also made her Bollywood debut with Mera Dil Leke Dekho where she did an item number.
- Gulabo Sapera – Dancer. A well-known singer-dancer from Rajasthan, she is famous for her folk style. She broke age-old traditions when took her culture on-stage at the age of 12, which was heavily promoted by the Late Prime Minister Rajiv Gandhi.
- Laxmi Tripathi – LGBT activist. She is a well known transgender activist who is also a dancer and activist. She holds the distinction of being the only Hijra in the UN’s Civil Society Task Force on HIV/AIDS. She also works for the community through her campaign group Astitva.
- Juhi Parmar – Television actress. She is known for playing the lead as Kumkum in Star Plus popular show Kumkum – Ek Pyara Sa Bandhan. In 2009, she participated in Pati Patni Aur Woh with her husband Sachin Shroff.

=== Wild card entrants ===
- Amar Upadhyay – Actor and model. He is known for acting in Kyunki Saas Bhi Kabhi Bahu Thi as Mihir. He later acted in films like LOC Kargil, Dharam Veer and 13B.
- Sidharth Bhardwaj – VJ, model and actor. He is known for participating in MTV Splitsvilla 2 and emerged as the winner in 2009. He later presented many shows like MTV Stripped and MTV Roadies.
- Akashdeep Saigal – Model and actor. He is known for playing Ansh / Eklavya in Kyunki Saas Bhi Kabhi Bahu Thi and Ranbir in Kuchh Is Tara. He participated in reality shows like Jhalak Dikhhla Jaa, Fear Factor India, Iss Jungle Se Mujhe Bachao and Zor Ka Jhatka: Total Wipeout.
- Sunny Leone – Former pornstar and film actress. She was named Penthouse Pet of the Year in 2003 and was a contract star for Vivid Entertainment. Named by Maxim as one of the 12 top porn stars in 2010, she has also played roles in independent mainstream films and television shows.

=== Guest entrants ===
- Swami Agnivesh - Social worker and Arya Samaj scholar. He was best known for his work against bonded labour through the Bonded Labour Liberation Front, which he founded in 1981. Agnivesh also founded and became president of the World Council of Arya Samaj, which he described as an associate of the original Arya Samaj, and served as the chairperson of the United Nations Voluntary Trust Fund on Contemporary Forms of Slavery from 2001 to 2004. He died on 11 September 2020. He entered the house on Day 38 to Day 41.
- Andrew Symonds – Cricketer. Symonds is a right-handed middle order batsman and alternates between medium pace and off-spin bowling. Since mid-2008, he spent most of the time out of the team, due to disciplinary reasons, including alcohol. In June 2009 he was sent home from the 2009 World Twenty20, his third suspension, expulsion or exclusion from selection in the space of a year. His central contract was then withdrawn, and many cricket analysts have speculated that the Australian administrators will no longer tolerate him, and that Symonds may announce his retirement. He entered on Day 67 to Day 78. He died in a car crash on 14 May 2022.
- Yamamotoyama Ryūta

== Guest appearances ==
Week	Day	Guest(s)	Purpose of Visit	Ref(s)
Premiere	Day 1	Ajay Devgn & Lisa Haydon	To promote their film Rascals.	
Premiere	Day 1	Samir Soni	To promote his show Parichay.	
1	Day 6	Zayed Khan & Dia Mirza	To promote their film Love Breakups Zindagi	
2	Day 13	Saqib Saleem & Saba Azad	To promote their film Mujhse Fraaandship Karoge	
3	Day 20	Arjun Rampal & Kareena Kapoor	To promote their film Ra.One	
4	Day 27	Ranbir Kapoor	To promote his film Rockstar	
5	Day 34	Dipika Kakar, Tina Datta, Nandish Sandhu, Shashank Vyas, Shubhangi Atre & Aditya Redij	Special appearances from Colors shows	
6	Day 41	Rashami Desai	Special appearance	
7	Day 48	Akshay Kumar & John Abraham	To promote their film Desi Boyz	
8	Day 55	Emraan Hashmi, Tusshar Kapoor & Vidya Balan	To promote their film The Dirty Picture	
9	Day 60	Mahesh Bhatt	Special appearance	
9	Day 62	Ranveer Singh & Anushka Sharma	To promote their film Ladies vs Ricky Bahl	
10	Day 69	Avika Gor	Special appearance	
11	Day 71	Anuradha Sharma	To support her son Sidharth Bhardwaj	
11	Day 71	Sachin Shroff	To support his wife Juhi Parmar	
11	Day 71	Hetal Upadhyay	To support her husband Amar Upadhyay	
11	Day 71	Madhu Bhatia	To support her brother Akashdeep Saigal	
11	Day 71	Shiraz Bhattacharya	To support his girlfriend Shonali Nagrani	
12	Day 83	Malhar Pandya, Aditya Redij, Shoaib Ibrahim, Rashami Desai, Dipika Kakar & Ajay Chaudhary	Special appearances	
13	Day 90	Neil Nitin Mukesh & Sonam Kapoor	To promote their film Players	
13	Day 90	Bappi Lahiri & Charu Semwal	Special appearances	
13	Day 90	Bharti Singh & Vijay Ishwarlal Pawar	Special appearances	
13	Day 90	Shweta Tiwari	Special appearances	
14	Day 97	Karan Johar & Imran Khan	To promote their film Ek Main Aur Ekk Tu	
14	Day 97	Malaika Arora	Special appearances	
14	Day 97	Dolly Bindra	Special appearances	
14	Day 97	Rakhi Sawant	Special appearances	
14	Day 97	Danish Khan	To support girlfriend Mahek Chahal	

== Weekly summary ==
Week 1	Task	Pahiya Ghumao Kismat Chamkao: Each Bigg Boss contestant had to take care of a bicycle and ensure that the wheels constantly keep spinning.
Week 1	Happenings	Day 2 : Captain Shakti Kapoor was dressed as Formula One driver and the female contestants were dressed in special pit girl costumes. Nihita who is trying to gel with the contestants tries to strike a conversation with Shakti. While Shakti is on the treadmill Nihita keeps blabbering to him on illogical topics. Shakti keeps his calm and listens to her but finally when Nihita goes back in the house, he is relieved at the sight. Nihita Biswas and Shraddha Sharma have a cat fight over household chores.; Day 3 - 5 : While all the housemates have been cycling over the night, Pooja Misrra - who has also contributed to the task – is resting in the morning when Captain Shakti Kapoor asks her to join the cycling team again. Pooja M. claims that she is unwell and snaps at the captain. This in turn gets all the housemates furious and upset with Misrra's behaviour. The housemates reach their final destination – Chennai. There the contestants are told to appoint one contestant as the choreographer. Laxmi Tripathi is the chosen one. She has to pick six dancers who will dance to a Tamil song. The other contestants, however, cannot go scot-free. They are required to memorise and sing the Tamil song while the dancers perform to it. Bigg Boss calls Shonali Nagrani into the confession room and offers some sweets in order to celebrate Dussehra. Bigg Boss also hands over a letter for the housemates in which he mentions that a board has been provided for the housemates to prepare a budget for the coming week. Since the housemates completed the task successfully, Bigg Boss awards them 3000 points for their luxury budget. While the housemates are trying to decide what all of them want from their allotted budget, the screen suddenly flashes the option for Pooja Misra's luggage which is worth 3000 points. While Laxmi feels that Pooja Misrra's bag needs to be given to her, Pooja Bedi tells everyone that Misrra has not been fulfilling her commitment towards the task or responsibilities in the house. Misrra retaliates and lashes out at Bedi for being insensitive towards her. She yells at Lakshmi too and stomps out of the living room. Shraddha Sharma later approaches Misrra, who adds that she does not wish to talk to 'the thing' – referring to Lakshmi Tripathi. Sonika Kaliraaman feels bad for Misrra and tries to console her. Mandeep Bevli offers her food to make her feel better. Missra realises her mistake.
Week 1	Nominations	Pooja M. (8 votes); Nihita (5 votes)
Week 1	Punishments	Day 5: Mandeep was jailed by due to her unfulfillment of the terms of the task giving by The Bigg Boss.
Week 1	Bigg Bomb	When leaving, Nihita was asked to send one person to jail as a power called Bigg Bomb. Nihita choose Pooja Bedi and locked her into the jail.
Week 1	Exits	Day 7: Nihita Biswas was evicted from the house after facing public vote.
Week 2	Task	Jiska Kaam Usi Ko Saanjhay : All housemates were given specific occupations in order to take care to the house in their respective costumes and roles.
Week 2	Happenings	Day 8 : A new Housemate Amar Upadhyay entered the house as the second male contestant.; Day 10 : Amar is given a special task. He is asked to nominate two people between whom the captain for the coming week will be elected. Amar decides to discuss the issue with his fellow housemates before deciding on two names. Many names are bounced around during this discussion.; Day 11 : The day starts with Shakti Kapoor complaining to Vida Samadzai about Amar Upadhyay not being up in the morning to successfully assist with the weekly task. They continue on to talk about other happenings inside the Bigg Boss House including the impending captain elections. Once the rest of the housemates are awake, Shakti lashes out about Amar to Juhi and asks her to have a word with him about not completing his responsibilities. After a tiresome argument about dishwashing responsibilities the previous night, Pooja B. takes her role seriously. But, when she asks Pooja Mishra to join her for washing the dishes in the morning, Pooja Mishra proceeds to the bedroom to apply makeup. This pisses Pooja Bedi off and she washes the dishes by herself. Amar and Mandeep Bevli decide to lobby for votes to be nominated as the captain for the coming week. While pointing out why he is the better option, Amar makes an unsavory comment that does not sit well with Juhi. A big fight ensues which results in a yelling match between Juhi and Amar. The other contestants intervene and push the duo in two separate directions. After a lot of justification and name-calling, a frazzled Juhi breaks down and refuses to eat. Seeing this, Amar apologizes to Juhi which she reluctantly accepts. Directions for next week's captain nominations are given. After the elections are completed and a new captain is elected, ex-captain Shakti Kapoor is asked to move out of the Head of House Room. Mandeep makes the plea for a reluctant Shakti so that he might be allowed to continue to stay in the captain's room. But Amar and Lakshmi intervene and ask him to move out of the room as per the house rules and move to the spot that will be vacated by the new captain.; Day 12 : After breakfast, Juhi Parmar is called into the confession room so that her role in the weekly task can be assessed. As she is stepping out, Bigg Boss announces that the group has been unsuccessful in completing the weekly task, as a result of which their luxury budget for the week stands cancelled. In the midst of this discussion, Raageshwari is called into the confession room and is assigned a secret task. Her task is to convince her fellow contestants that Mandeep is not the correct choice for captain of the house, and organize a re-election for the captain's position. Pooja Mishra blew her top over an innocuous inquiry by the housemate Shonali Nagrani. Pooja has found it difficult to fit inside the house from the start. Her tantrums and her evasion of duties have irked the housemates. Shonali inquired Pooja M. about her post-dinner clean-up duties by asking "Pooja what is this behaviour?", the latter flew into a fit of rage and yelled: "You do not tell me what to do!", later on threatening to hit Shonali because when she asks that whether Pooja will hit her then she replies "Do you want it?Because you're asking for it. You're dying for it!" And when another housemate, Vida Samadzai joined Nagrani, Missra smacked the broom on the floor, breaking its shaft. Upset over Pooja's temper, the housemates requested Bigg Boss to evict her from the house because of her inability to cope with any member of the house. However, Bigg Boss told the house mates not to tell him how to run the house as he is the leader of the house not them and warned the housemates not to question his judgements.
Week 2	Nominations	Pooja M. (9 votes); Gulabo (3 votes); Mandeep (4 votes) (Taken back by the captain)
Week 2	Bigg Bomb	When leaving, Gulabo was giving a special power by the name of 'Bigg Bomb' and had to choose one housemate to dish-wash for the rest of the week. Gulabo chose Pooja M. for the task. Her punishment ended on Day 16.
Week 2	Punishments	Pooja Bedi was locked into the jail for 24 hours according to the power given to Nihita while exiting.
Week 2	Exits	Day 8 : Sonika Kaliraman Malik was ejected from the house because Bigg Boss feared health concerns due to mental pressure on her pregnancy.; Day 14: Gulabo Sapera was evicted from the house after facing the public vote.
Week 3	Task	Mai Chotta Sa Nanha Sa Bachcha Hu : Six Housemates have to act like kids and six others as their parents. Juhi, Raageshwari, Pooja Bedi, Shakti and Siddharth are in the kids category and Laxmi, Vida, Pooja Misrra, Amar and Mahek have to act like parents.
Week 3	Happenings	Day 15 : A new housemate Siddharth Bhardwaj entered the house as the third male contestant.; Day 16 : The day starts with Mahek Chahel confronting Pooja Bedi about being two-faced and saying negative things about her behind her back. Later, Shraddha Sharma starts teasing Vida Samadzai about Amar Upadhyay due to the way they flirt. Mahek gets angry at Shraddha and asks her to stop saying such things because Vida is her friend. Shonali Nagrani interferes in this matter, leading to a huge fight between her and Mahek. Lakshmi Tripathi, Shonali and Juhi Parmar are surprised to see Mahek involving herself in every argument in the house. Juhi tries to calm Mahek down, but Mahek asks her to not interfere in her matters. Not knowing what to do, Juhi leaves the room. Mahek then approaches Juhi while she is sitting with Pooja Bedi, Shonali, Raageshwari Loomba and the other housemates and re-confronts her. At this, Juhi loses her cool and tells Mahek that she doesn't want to deal with her. Mahek and Juhi have a huge fight and the housemates break up. A fuming Mahek walks into the garden to cool down. Siddharth Bhardwaj lends a shoulder to Mahek and calms her down. The weekly task is announced and Mandeep is given full exemption from the task. The other 12 contestants are divided into two groups of six each. Both groups are given two separate responsibilities and roles and they will be judged on their ability to maintain their roles. After two days of washing dishes without any relent, Bigg Boss finally announces that Pooja Misrra no longer needs to do it alone and this responsibility can now be shared by all the housemates. Pooja rejoices at this announcement while the rest of the housemates immediately start discussing how the responsibility will now need to be divided. The men finally take centre stage when Siddharth starts spreading rumours about Amar and angers him. A clueless Sidharth continues to talk ill about Amar even though concerned housemates warn him of an impending fight that is bound to ruin relations between the two. To end the matter, Siddharth and Amar pep themselves up for a fight, but they are clear that it will happen only after the weekly task is complete.; Day 17 : The housemates wake up and continue with their weekly task of being parents and kids. The overgrown children are having a gala time, as they get to play all day and their parents pamper them while giving the kids everything they ask for. The parents, though a little annoyed, seem to be enjoying the roles assigned to them. Shakti Kapoor and Siddharth Bhardwaj contemplate about 'captain nominations' for the coming week. The duo analyses and evaluates every contestant to figure out who will be the best person for the role of captain. Siddharth is called into the confession room and asked to select two people out of which any one would be elected as captain for the following week. Though Siddharth doesn't reveal to the housemates why he had been called into the confession room, a nervous Mahek Chahel gives a hint to him about who should be nominated for the captain's position. Later, Siddharth is called back into the confession room to enumerate his final selection. Bigg Boss then reveals the names to the other contestants in the house and permits them to campaign and lobby for votes so that they are elected for the position. Meanwhile, Mandeep Bevli and Shakti discuss Siddharth's inclusion in Pooja Bedi's gang and how this will strengthen their group while exposing the others to elimination. Amar Upadhyay mocks Siddharth and his lack of tact and Mahek also expresses her views about the newcomer in the house. Amar is given a secret task until daybreak to convince seven members of the house to call a re-nomination for the post of captain and give their decision to Bigg Boss or convince Siddharth to change his decision in front of the camera. Amar puts in full effort to try to change the minds of the contestants who originally seemed satisfied with Siddharth's decision. Ending the captaincy discussion and ensuing tension, Bigg Boss adds a fun twist to the weekly task. 'The kids' of the house are allotted a task of organising a birthday party for Siddharth, whose nickname for the weekly task is Chinku. They are required to decorate the house, make personalised greeting cards, a birthday cake and provide entertainment for the entire group. Raageshwari Loomba, who has been renamed Doll for the weekly task, is asked to lead the preparations for the bachcha party. The 'parents' and 'kids' alike look at this as a chance to forget about their differences and have some fun.; Day 18 : Most of the housemates voted for Shonali Nagrani and she has become the new captain of 'Bigg Boss' house. Then came the bouncer from Bigg Boss, Shonali can still be eliminated from the show. In case of her eviction, a new captain will be chosen. Pooja Bedi was later repenting her suggestion of voting for Shonali. At night, Bigg Boss decided to throw a pool party for housemates. As expected girls of Bigg Boss 5, took out their swimsuits for the fun pool bash. Pooja Bedi was the first one to jump inside the pool. Vida Samadzai, Shonali Nagrani, Mahek Chahal, Pooja Misrra and Shraddha Sharma were busy grooving to the beats and wooing the men around. Vida was seen getting a little too close with Siddharth Bhardwaj and Amar Upadhyay. Meanwhile, Mandeep told Amar that Shonali dances like her maid.; Day 19: Taking his role as a kid very seriously, Sidharth starts the day by ordering 'mother' Mahek around. He asks her to bring him his cap and feed him. When Mahek tells him to get his cap himself, Sidharth turns around and announces to people in the house that his 'mom' is very short-tempered. This irritates Mahek, who bites her tongue and keeps herself from reacting to his statements. However, when Sidharth repeatedly calls her short-tempered and tries to order her around even more, Mahek finally loses her cool. She picks on everything that Sidharth has done to irritate her during his stay in the house, and asks him to stay away from her. Amar, having failed the secret task assigned to him, was given his punishment by Bigg Boss. Amar has been assigned to be a personal slave to fellow male contestants, Sidharth and Shakti, until further intimation. Amar seemed to be peeved at the idea of playing this role, especially because the duo has renamed him PK Lele for the duration of this punishment. Sidharth and Shakti, later discuss with the other housemates, about Amar's attempt to get them to change their minds about the captain nominations and how they didn't pay much heed to his requests at that time. Pooja Misrra and Vida have a conflict during their weekly activity cleaning the house; Vida then goes on to tell Pooja Misrra that she would prefer to not talk to her because she does not like Pooja's attitude. Pooja Misrra, unable to understand this issue, tries to argue with Vida and understand her point of view, but soon gives up and agrees to keep interaction with her to a minimum. Frustrated with the way Shakti and Sidharth are treating him, Amar informs Lakshmi that he is biding his time and will take revenge when the time is right. In fact, they even make Amar dance to Shakti's song Tunna Tunna to agitate him, but are unsuccessful at it because Amar takes it light-heartedly. At the end of the day, it is announced that the contestants have successfully completed their weekly task and were rewarded 1800 points to manage their weekly luxury budget. After dinner, a special Vodafone Facebook task is given to the contestants. The contestants live the life-sized version of the most popular functions of Facebook. The task was carried out in four stages and the winners of each task were given special prizes. While the contestants were enjoying the task at its onset, eventually the task saw an emotional outburst by Sidharth who revealed to his fellow contestants the details of his personal life including his estrangement from him family. He added that though he is proud of the progress he has made in his life, he still misses his family. Hearing his pain-filled life story, every member in the Bigg Boss house had tears in their eyes and provided him with some much-needed support.
Week 3	Nominations	Pooja M. (Nominated by Bigg Boss as a punishment for breaking household property); Raageshwari (Nominated by Bigg Boss as a punishment for not being able to complete the secret task given to her by the Bigg Boss); Mahek (Nominated by Mandeep); Amar (5 votes); Shonali(4 votes); Juhi (4 votes)
Week 3	Bigg Bomb	When leaving, Raageshwari was asked to send one person to jail as a power called 'Bigg Bomb' which is given to the evicted housmate. Raageshwari choose Siddharth and locked him into the jail.
Week 3	Punishments	Pooja Misrra had to wash all dishes alone for 24 hours according to the power given to Gulabo while exiting.; Amar Upadhyay, having failed the secret task assigned to him by the Bigg Boss, was assigned to be a personal slave to fellow male contestants, Siddharth and Shakti as punishment.
Week 3	Exits	Day 21: Raageshwari was evicted from the house after facing the public vote.
Week 4	Tasks	Ra.One : Contestants were given masks, capes and gloves and were asked to come up with a superhero name and a super power. Contestants were also asked to perform to the song Chammak Challo where Lakshmi Tripathi was made choreographer. Bigg Boss chose Pooja Misrra the winner of the task and awarded her with a gift hamper full of Ra.One action figures and T-shirts.; Diya Jalay Tou Diwali Nahi Jalay Tou Diwala : Housemates form two teams and are given the task to make diyas for Diwali. the teams which makes 500 diyas first wins the luxury budget and the losing teams has to survive on basic ration for a week.; Maruti Suzuki- India's most fuel efficient car : Housemates had to express who in their opinion is a more deserving candidate to win the show. Bigg Boss chose Juhi as the winner and awarded her with a gift hamper.
Week 4	Happenings	Day 23 : A new Housemate Akashdeep Saighal entered the house as the fourth male contestant. The day started with a big fight between Shraddha Sharma and Pooja Bedi over an omelette. Pooja Bedi seems to dislike Shraddha's cooking. The two argue and finally Pooja Bedi decides to make her own breakfast. After breakfast, Pooja Bedi and Juhi Parmar discussed Raageshwari's eviction and how the increase in fights since her exit must be affecting her. Shraddha involved herself in the conversation and a few heated words were exchanged between Pooja Bedi and Shraddha. Bored with the negativity that 10 women and three men brought to the house, Vida Samadzai shared her disappointment with Bigg Boss and said she hoped more men entered the house soon so that the contestants could engage in something other than back-biting and hypocrisy. A task was announced in the house where contestants were given masks, capes and gloves and were asked to come up with a superhero name and a super power. Contestants were also asked to perform to a song where Lakshmi Tripathi was made choreographer. While the song was playing and the contestants were performing, Sky aka Akashdeep Saighal entered the house in a superhero costume. When Sky entered, he danced seductively with Lakshmi and she pulled off his mask. After everyone had greeted him, the song continued and Sky also continued to dance with Lakshmi. It seems that the newcomer got his first friend in the house. Lakshmi took Sky into a room and made him aware about the catfights going on in the house and warned him to stay away from the controversies. Sky, in turn, told her about what is going on in the outside world. Another fight broke out between Pooja Bedi and Shraddha when the latter called her aunty. Pooja Bedi asked Shakti to support her on this but he completely ignored her which caused her to lose her temper and share her woes with Amar Upadhyay. Shakti had decided not to talk to any woman in the house therefore he didn't reply to Pooja Bedi but Pooja Bedi believes that Shakti doesn't respect her and their 22-year-old friendship. Shonali Nagrani tried to calm Pooja Bedi down but she yelled at her too and tried to portray Shakti negatively.; Day 25: The day started with Siddhart flirting with Shonali. Shonali was missing her family and got very sentimental, Siddhath saw her upset & lent his shoulder. He tried to make Shonali laugh by passing some silly jokes. Lakshmi observing this called Siddharth and teased him. Followed by this, contestants received Diwali gifts from their loved ones. These gifts were specially delivered inside the house to lighten the overall tense atmosphere. Everyone, except Pooja Misrra, became really emotional upon seeing their gifts. Pooja Misrra seemed uninterested in the gifts sent to her by her friends. Adding to the joyous feeling in the house, captaincy nominations were held. Contestants were asked to choose between renominating Shonali as the captain or electing a new captain. The poll was completed a new captain for an upcoming week was finalized. Pooja Bedi and Mahek were upset about who was chosen the captain for the coming week. The duo was also stunned at Lakshmi's votes and confronted her about it. For the coming week, Shraddha and Siddharth were given the task of dish washing and the cooking team, consisting of Juhi and Pooja Bedi, expressed dissatisfaction with their work. Juhi was disappointed with Shraddha's work because she felt Shraddha was not doing a good job at cleaning the dishes and they were still dirty. Juhi then asked the captain to take the issue up with dishwashing team and ensure they did their job well. Irritated about the way she was being treated, Shraddha approached everyone in the house at different times and spoke ill about Pooja Bedi. In the evening, the housemates were provided a few items along with the idol of Goddess Lakshmi in order to conduct a small Lakshmi Puja to celebrate Diwali. All the housemates were overjoyed at this and begun preparations for a Puja. Soon after the puja, a task was announced for the contestants. For the task, they had to give their opinions about who was the best and most efficient person in the house. To add to the Diwali celebrations, Bigg Boss sent in a special big dark chocolate cake and many fireworks. Contestants lit the fireworks and celebrated diwali by wishing their families, friends and Bigg Boss. They thanked Bigg Boss for making them feel special while they were spending time away from family.; Day 26: The day starts with yet another fight as Pooja Misrra and Vida Samadzai get into an argument over a waist band which is supposedly Vida's. Vida claims that it had fallen down a couple of days back which Pooja Misrra had picked up conveniently and kept it with her. This really upsets Vida and she goes and talks to Mahek about it. Lakshmi Tripathi, Amar and Siddharth discuss Pooja Misrra and her psychotic behaviour in the house. They feel that fighting with people is like an addiction for her, and that she literally cannot survive without arguing with someone or the other. They come to an agreement that something needs to be done as she is crossing all limits and being a burden instead of a buddy to everyone. Pooja M. joins the party at the dining table and taunts Amar for a statement he had made. Amar taunts her back. Lakshmi intervenes and cracks a few jokes about Pooja Misra. Shraddha Sharma and Siddharth are washing the dishes as Sky walks in and offers to help. Shradhha gives him her job and walks away coolly. Later Sky realises that what he thought was a two-minute job is actually a major job. After sometime, Bigg Boss calls all the housemates to the living room to make an announcement. Once all are present in the living room, Bigg Boss punishes Pooja Misrra, Pooja Bedi and Vida for speaking in English despite several warnings. The punishment is that all three shall be handcuffed until the next announcement, and only one of the three can sit at one time. Pooja Misrra and Pooja Bedi start blaming Vida for the punishment as they claimed that she is the sole reason why people feel the need to speak in English. Pooja Bedi and Pooja Misrra sing a bhajan for Bigg Boss as an apology. The boys of the house have a little gossip session of their ownabout who will be evicted next. They decide that Pooja Bedi has the highest chances of getting evicted. Shraddha and Amar talk about the coming week's nominations and plan as to between whom they can create a fight for their personal benefit. An emotional Pooja Bedi starts crying to Bigg Boss and expresses that she is being used, abused and insulted time and again throughout the show. After a while, just before the lights go off Bigg Boss relieves the punished from the handcuffs and all are tired and go to sleep.
Week 4	Nominations	Mahek (Nominated by Shonali); Pooja B. (7 votes); Shraddha (4 votes); Shakti(4 votes)
Week 4	Bigg Bomb	While leaving Shakti was asked to nominate two housemates for eviction on Week 5 according to the power giving to him as Bigg Bomb. Shakti chose Pooja M. and Amar adding 1 vote for each of them in the upcoming nomination.
Week 4	Punishments	Siddharth Bhardwaj was locked into the jail for 24 hours according to the power given to Raageshwari while exiting.; Pooja Misrra, Vida Samadzai and Pooja Bedi were handcuffed together as punishment for conversing mostly in English.
Week 4	Exits	Day 28: Shakti Kapoor was evicted from the house after facing the public vote.
Week 5	Tasks	Lambee Hai Dooree, Chadhhna Zarooree : Housemates were instructed to do Wall climbing and a crash obstacle course. Housemates had to cover 12000 ft hiking on a 20 feet wall created in the Activity area inside the house.
Week 5	Happenings	Day 29: Akashdeep kept on trying to take up a fight with Pooja Misrra. He even challenged Misrra by saying, "Just wait and watch you will be soon eliminated from Bigg Boss." However, Misrra didn't fight back with Akash. During a conversation, Amar Upadhyay said Mandeep Bevli is the smartest player in the house and will make it to the end. Pooja Bedi added, "Even I feel the same. We totally forget her at the time of nominations." Obviously, all this was communicated to Mandeep by different sources and there was a huge drama around it. Mandeep even told Laxmi Narayan that her 'son' Amar plans to nominate her. Akashdeep aka Sky overreacted on this as well and made Amar apologize to everyone. Sky even suggested Amar to take his suggestions regarding nominations and not play dirty games. Repercussions of this entire spat were visible on the nomination process too. Amar Upadhyay, Mahek Chahal, Pooja Misrra and Mandeep Bevli have been nominated for eviction this week. After being saved by the audience several times, Mahek has become really confident now. After her name was announced she said, "Many housemates think that I am a strong player and they keep on nominating me. However, I will be saved again and this will be like a slap on their faces."; Day 30: The day starts on a slightly happy note for a change as Amar & Lakshmi patch up after their fight the previous night. The duo had fought mainly because both were blaming each other for playing a double game. After a while, Mahek is seen washing the dishes with Sky by her side. The topic of conversation was Shonali and Mahek was busy explaining to Sky as to how slyly Shonali has been trying to be in every single housemate's good books. Sometime later, Juhi & Vida are spending sometime on her bed. An emotionally drained Vida breaks down completely as Juhi sits by and consoles her. Vida expressed as to how much she misses her family & that the house's atmosphere is getting to her. An understanding Juhi hugs her and manages to calm her down. On the other side, Mandeep & Amar gang up & start bitching about Shonali & Pooja Bedi. Both start finding faults in them & come to an agreement that they will maintain safe distance from them in order to avoid fights & controversies. Then, Bigg Boss calls Sky to the confession room & hands him over a letter. Sky comes to the living area & reads out the letter to the rest of the housemates. The letter basically explains the weekly task which has been assigned to the housemates. The task is pretty demanding in terms of physical endurance. Shraddha & Pooja Misrra are seen cooking lunch in the kitchen. Shradhha takes the opportunity of being alone & starts bitching about Juhi to Pooja Misra. She begins to explain to Pooja that Juhi is the main threat for her & that she should be careful whenever she is around. She instigates Pooja by giving her some examples of Juhi's double game. Sky also warns Shraddha & asks he to stay away from Amar since he is very dangerous. In a while, Shraddha walks up to Amar and instigates Amar by saying that Sky is stealing away all the glory from him & he is becoming the popular one amongst the housemates.; Day 31: Bigg Boss assigned Pooja Misrra the task of selecting two people as candidates for captainship. After much deliberation and discussion with other contestants, Pooja M. takes her name and shradhha's for the coming week will be elected. In the evening, an argument breaks out between Shraddha Sharma and Sky (Akashdeep). When Sky asks Shraddha who she would elect as the captain for the coming week, Shraddha tells him that her decision was only for Bigg Boss to know. This cheeky response irritates him because he feels he has asked a very simple question. Shraddha, however, ignores him and says that she had a stomach ache and doesn't want to talk about the captaincy nominations. Shraddha shares her conversation with Sky with the other housemates, who are impressed by her maturity in handling the situation without losing her cool. Post his argument with Shraddha, Sky approaches Amar with the same question. Amar, too, has no interest in disclosing his choice or continuing the conversation. Near dinner time, a huge misunderstanding takes place which adds to the troubled atmosphere prevalent inside the Bigg Boss 5 house. Mahek is talking about Sky's personality to the housemates, which he happens to overhear. He tries to confront Mahek and the fight takes a turn for the worse. An enraged Sky starts pulling out the skeletons from Mahek's closet and provokes her to fight with him. Mahek loses her cool and lashes out at him. However, after a while, she breaks down and everyone helps her to her bedroom. Realising his folly, Sky apologises to Mahek but Mahek she is in no mood to listen. As if the huge fight between Sky and Mahek was not enough, another misunderstanding takes place between Siddharth and Vida which leaves the housemates wondering whether fights would be the order of the day going forward. During the fights Amar hits Pooja M. with the gun provided by the Bigg boss because of the army task leaving her with a soaring scratch on her arm. Pooja confronts Amar about the pain giving rise to yet another fight.; Day 32 : The day starts with Siddharth swimming in the pool early in the morning and Mahek passes by. An upset Mahek points a finger at Siddharth & tells him that for now he can get away with wearing bangles and stay out of the situation but she will soon get back to him and teach him a lesson as well. Siddharth tells her to bring it on and accuses her of being very unreasonable. The day has yet another fight with Siddharth bursting out at Vida as she had accused him of being immature. Vida had told him to stay away from her the previous night when Mahek was very emotional about her outburst with Sky. A stubborn Siddharth still went ahead and brought the topic of Vida accusing him of eating too much 'dal'. Vida shooed him away from the scene by telling him that her friend's emotions are more important rather than his stupid childish behavior. Sky explains to Shonali that she needs to stop mediating as that lands her in trouble without her noticing. In sometime, an agitated Mahek lashes out at Sky for the embarrassment that he had caused her last night. She is extremely furious and abuses and accuses him of being totally inhuman. She is very aggressive and warns him by saying that she will stay and ensure that she teaches him a lesson for his misbehavior. Sky fights back and accuses her further and calls her a dustbin and walks off the situation. After all the trauma, torture & chaos the housemates are left in a very vulnerable state. Shonali the ex captain of the house is found extremely confused & spaced out. She sits on the dining table with Sky, Mandeep etc. and bursts into tears as she is absolutely clueless about what is happening in the house and doubts everybody's intentions. A while later, Sky and Siddharth are sitting in the verandah and discussing the post effects of the fight. Sky expresses that he hates Lakshmi Tripathi. Sky tells Siddharth that Lakshmi is purely a two faced woman and she just pretends to be fair all the time to gain everyone's attention. She is actually a diplomatic person who contradicts herself by bitching about others all the time & supporting her friends even when they are wrong. Also, he accuses Amar of being a sissy and staying out of the entire scene. Looks like the men in the house are no lesser in gossiping amongst themselves.
Week 5	Nominations	Pooja M. (Nominated by Shonali); Amar (6 votes); Mandeep (5 votes); Mahek (5 votes)
Week 5	Bigg Bomb	While Leaving, Mandeep was asked to save one housemate from next week's nomination. Mandeep chose Siddharth and made him immune from Week 6 eviction.
Week 5	Punishments	Pooja M. and Amar had 1 vote added to their count prior to the nominations according to the power given to Shakti while exiting.
Week 5	Exits	Day 35: Mandeep Bevli was evicted from the house after facing the public vote.
Week 6	Task	Shraddha Ki Riyaasat: Shraddha will be treated as a queen and the rest will be her attendants.
Week 6	Happenings	Day 36: The day starts with Sky and Siddharth feeling bad about Mandeep's eviction. The boys and most of the girls in the house are seen upset post her exit. After sometime, Bigg Boss asks all the housemates to assemble in the living area for the weekly nominations. The nominations take place and four unexpected names crop up in the nominations. Then, Siddharth and Pooja Misrra gang up against Shraddha, who's the captain of the house. They lash out at her for being an unfair captain. Sky instigates Pooja Misrra to fight with Shonali and Vida, before it gets too late. He explains to her that if she doesn't fight with either of them, then her chances of elimination would increase. He is apparently plotting this plan to eventually blame Shraddha and get her into a vulnerable state. After a while, Pooja Misrra is seen going crazy and shouting her lungs out at Vida. She yells at her for not giving her equal opportunity to use the kitchen when required. The fight gets really ugly and the housemates have to intervene and stop the fight. The day ends with Sky expressing his happiness, as his plan succeeds to some extent.; Day 37: The day started on a very positive note and everyone around was happy in the house on the eve of Eid. Sanjay Dutt sends special Eid greetings and sweets to the contestants and all the contestants are dressed up for this very special day. On the day of Eid, Vida wishes to be with her family and cries inconsolably throughout the day. All the contestants tried hard to stop her tears, but it seemed like nothing could stop them. Slowly as the day passes, Sky and Lakshmi had a small argument over playing unfair games and they soon patched up too. The day took another surprising turn when Mahek and Sky discussed the issues that had happened a week ago and promised each other to forget everything and patch up. A very hilarious weekly task is then assigned by Bigg Boss to the housemates. Shraddha being the captain of the house orders Pooja Misrra to do a particular task which flares Pooja Misrra up and in turn she retaliates and refuses to do the task. This results in a small tiff between the two.; Day 38: Swami Agnivesh entered the house as a Houseguest. The day started with the housemates waking up with the routine wake up track. In sometime, Pooja Misra is seen painting her T- shirt with her 'Kajal' & lipstick. She is seen in a very funny looking avatar which gets all the housemates amused. She also explains the reason behind her act. Amar and Vida are seen discussing Pooja Misrra's measure to attract attention. In a while, Bigg Boss calls Shraddha to the confession room and assigns her a secret task. Pooja Misrra who was upset with the captain initially in the day, walks into her room and clears her difference with Shraddha. Shraddha makes an effort to patch up with her and explains that she has no hard feelings for anyone. After sometime, the housemates finally experience yet another crazy fight. The fight was over a negligible issue but for Pooja it was a big deal and Laxmi blew it out of proportion. The fight was amusing for the rest of the housemates as this behavior was more or less a routine. Some peace was resolved as the housemates calm a furious Lakshmi down.; Day 39: The housemate behaved well in Swami's presence, smiled a lot, forgot the differences among themselves, worked harder and tried to impress Swami with their behavior. The activity of searching Garnier products hidden in the pool area and climbing the pole to drop tubes was conducted in good spirit with Team Amar winning outright. They work without hesitation and do not yell. PB and Juhi look too delighted and willingly contribute extra bit on orders of Shraddha. Shonali remained stuck to Swami. Sidharth chose to wear Swami's clothes. He does not realize that behaviors and habits can't be changed by wearing clothes of saints. Swami's views about gender inequality were challenged by Laxmi who felt that the bias of all was towards the ladies and trans genders did not get due respect and attention. Pooja Misrra was encouraged by Swami when he told her that she was right in her beliefs. Swami was not true in his comments. He told Sky that he was right in what he did and must keep it up. This was like fuelling him further to light up the house with his temper. Siddharth was also appreciated for his behavior in the house.
Week 6	Nominations	Akashdeep (Nominated by Shraddha); Pooja M. (6 votes); Mahek (6 votes); Laxmi (3 votes)
Week 6	Bigg Bomb	While Leaving, Laxmi was asked to save one housemate from next week's nomination. Laxmi chose Mahek and made her immune from Week 7 eviction.
Week 6	Punishments	Amar and Vida were jailed by Shraddha for not following the rules of the weekly task and upsetting her.
Week 6	Immunity	Siddharth was immune from eviction, according to the power given to Mandeep while exiting, hence Housemates were unable to cast their nominations against him.
Week 6	Exits	Day 41: Swami Agnivesh was asked to leave the house by the Bigg Boss after a visit of three days.; Day 42: Laxmi Narayan Tripathi was evicted from the house after facing the public vote.
Week 7	Task	Raajneeti: Housemates have to act like politicians and form two parties under two leaders who will have to convince members of the opposing party to form alliance with theirs.
Week 7	Happenings	Day 43: On the night of Day 42, Pooja Misrra locked herself up inside the bathroom for close to three hours. This stuns the entire house. Since Sky is the captain of the house, he takes up the responsibility of approaching Pooja Misrra and questioning her about her act. Pooja Misrra tells him to get lost. That night, the entire house goes to sleep fearful that Pooja Misrra has been possessed by a ghost. The next day, Pooja Bedi talks to Sky about Pooja Misrra. She tells him that Pooja Misrra is angry with him. Sky puts his ego aside and walks up to Pooja Misrra and tries to clarify their differences. A stubborn Pooja Misrra walks away and says that she is not interested in talking to him. After sometime, Pooja Misrra is seen speaking about how people in the house are hypnotising her and turning her innocent soul into a violent one to get everyone against her. She is also seen bitching about Sky to Pooja Bedi, saying that he is instigating her to fight with Shraddha Sharma and Vida Samadzai. Pooja Misrra explains to Amar Upadhyay that she was only doing pranayam (breathing exercises) in the loo, but everyone misunderstood her and thought she is practising black magic. Siddharth Bhardwaj tries to reason with Pooja Misrra about her behaviour, but he just ends up feeling so frustrated that he yells at her that he will make sure nobody in the house talks to her. Weekly nominations take place. Captain Sky's special nomination turns out to be a surprise nomination for the entire house. Post the nominations the non-nominated contestants are seen bonding with each other and celebrating their victory of relief for the week. After a while, Siddharth goes to the smoking room where he finds Pooja Misrra. He tries to enter the room but Pooja Misrra slams the door really hard on his face. Siddharth loses his temper and runs in to the house to tell everyone what happened. He warns everybody to stay away from him as he is going to get back at her. The two get into a very nasty fight, so much so that Siddharth almost kicks her. The housemates intervene and with great difficulty calm Siddharth down. Post this violent outburst, Pooja M. goes to her bed and starts meditating. Mahek comes to offer her support. She consoles Pooja M. by saying that she can understand what she is going through right now and just wants her to know that she will be there if she needs a person to talk to. After that, Vida informs the green room inhabitants that Pooja Misrra is changing her room. Everyone breathes a sigh of relief. The day ends and all the housemates go to sleep but restless and tense.; Day 44: It is a new morning and a fresh start in the Bigg Boss house and as the day begins, Pooja Misrra is seen starting on a new note about yesterday's fight. Pooja Misrra sits along with Pooja Bedi and vents out her anger about yesterday's fight with Sidharth. She points out how Sidharth misbehaved with her first and abused her family to which Pooja Bedi replied that it was partly Pooja Misrra's fault too that Sidharth's anger aggravated. As the day progresses, Bigg Boss announces a weekly task for which the entire house is seen working in unison. The contestants are then seen preparing for their weekly task and await further announcements from Bigg Boss to carry out the task. Pooja Bedi, Sky and Juhi are seen bonding with each other during the afternoon and talk of how the weekly task can be a great way of breaking Amar down. Shonali is seen upset ever since the nominations. She finds a consoling shoulder in Sidharth and tells him how Sky has been playing double and unfair games. She expresses her grief to Sidharth and soon Vida is seen joining the two and consoling Shonali. Shonali tells Sidharth that ever since day one, she knew what games Sky has been playing and that all her predictions for Sky have been coming true. Sidharth asks Shonali to go and talk to Sky about all of this. Sidharth asks Shonali not to feel so bad about the nominations. Shonali also confronts Sidharth and asks him, why he did not stop Sky from nominating for her name. Bigg Boss then gives out the Code of Conduct letter to the housemates re-iterating the rules of the house. The code of conduct letter is given to the house to tell the housemates that apart from these rules, they need to come up with 10 more rules which would be followed by the entire house. The entire house is seen enthusiastic about the task and everyone is seen working peacefully in their teams for the task. The entire house is in the task mode and are seen enjoying the task and are seen enjoying the team work. Pooja Misrra almost gets jailed as she defies a captain's rule made by Sky. Sky asks Pooja Misrra to go in the jail, but soon rethinks his decisions and thinks it would be best if he does not mess with her anymore. After dinner, Shonali is seen crying again over the nominations issue. She is still unable to digest the fact that Sky has nominated her name for next week's evictions. This shows that Shonali really wants to be a part of the Bigg Boss house and cannot see herself out of the house within a few weeks of coming in.; Day 45: The day starts with the routine wake up song and all the housemates are up and awake. Pooja Misrra is picked on by Sky and Siddharth especially for consuming too many eggs on a regular basis. Sky being the house captain tells Pooja Misrra that if she doesn't stop this bad habit then he would send her to jail. An angry Pooja Misrra retaliates by announcing to the rest of the housemates that she will be on 'maun vrath' the entire day in order to stop being everyone's target. Vida approaches Amar and tells him that she wants to clarify a few things regarding her nomination. While they both get into an intense conversation, the bad boys aka Siddharth and Sky interfere and start instigating Amar against Vida. The duo has some success as Vida gets a little emotional. Post their departure Amar manages to convince Vida a little bit. After sometime, Sky and Shonali are seen chilling in the captain's room and discussing the happenings of the house. While both are at it, Pooja Misra storms into the captain's room and barges into the restroom without his permission. An angry Sky comes out and tells the rest of the housemates that going into the captain's restroom without prior permission is against the Bigg Boss house rules. So he walks back into his room, enters the restroom and forcefully gets her out and tells her that her behavior is just not accepted. An angry Pooja Misrra walks out and complains to Amar that her elbow was hurt when Sky forcefully opened the door on her. Amar intervenes and tells her that she needs to take the captain's permission for using his loo. Pooja creates a big scene as usual and shouts out saying that she will make everyone suffer for this brutal behavior against her. An agitated Sky being the captain sends her to jail as a punishment for her obnoxious behavior. In a bit, Bigg Boss calls the phone assigned in the house for the "Rajneeti" task. Coincidentally Sky receives the phone call and figures that he needs to send one of his party members to the other party. In sometime, Pooja Misrra is released from the jail. The daily task is introduced in the house and all the housemates get excited to perform the task. Post the task, Siddharth and Mahek get into a very ugly fight. Mahek instigates Siddharth by saying a few nasty things about his family and that gets Siddharth extremely angry. The housemates intervene and calm things down. The day comes to an end as Sky and Pooja Bedi hug and make up with Pooja Misrra. The diplomatic duo seems to keep everyone in their control.
Week 7	Nominations	Bigg Boss asked Sky to bring along a member of his choice to the confession room. Sky chose Siddharth to assist him in deciding the four names to place against the public vote. As a result, the four names decided with their consensus were as below: Shraddha; Pooja M.; Vida; Shonali
Week 7	Bigg Bomb	While leaving Vida was asked to nominate two housemates for eviction on Week 8 according to the power giving to her as Bigg Bomb. Vida chose Shraddha and Siddharth adding 1 vote for each of them in the upcoming nomination.
Week 7	Punishments	Day 45 : Pooja M. was jailed by Sky for entering the Captain's lounge without his permission.; Day 46: Mahek and Siddharth were jailed by Sky and Amar respectively for shouting and abusing each other which was against the rules laid down by their parties in accordance with the weekly task.
Week 7	Immunity	Mahek was immune from eviction, according to the power given to Laxmi while exiting, hence Housemates were unable to cast their nominations against her.
Week 7	Exits	Day 49: Vida Samadzai was evicted from the house after facing the public vote.
Week 8	Task	Haseena teri Misaal kahan: Titles are given to the beauties of the house with the three boys as their mentors. The title holders have to enact the title for the week.
Week 8	Happenings	Day 49 - 50: Famous Indo-Canadian Porn-star Sunny Leone entered the house as a female wild card entry. After the evictions Sky, Juhi, Pooja Bedi and Siddharth have a casual chat when Amar enters and Sky tells Amar that the way Vida had been behaving throughout the show with Amar has depicted Amar in a negative light and showed that he is characterless. Both the men enter into an argument when Mahek comes and pulls Amar away and asks him not to stoop down to Sky's level and have an unnecessary argument with Sky. Juhi comments on this act of Mahek saying she is the one who is seen fighting and pouncing in the house half the times and she acting like a peace-maker now looks just so contradictory. In the evening we see beautiful Sunny entering the Bigg Boss house in a grand manner. She is seen dancing on a Bollywood number and is wearing a fine traditional Indian outfit. The housemates are extremely excited as they think she is their 'New Vida' and think her to be the perfect replacement for Vida. Sky does not miss his chance of luring Sunny to be a part of his room, when the entire house was still just trying to know her well. The housemates are seen quite happy with their new fellow contestant and are seen bonding with her really well. Early in the morning as the day begins, Sky and Shonali have a huge argument. Sky thinks that Shonali is upset with him as he had nominated her the previous week for evictions where as Shonali says that she has forgotten it all long back. Sky is generally irritated with Shonali and has been behaving upset ever since the 'Rajneeti' task ended. Sky does not leave a chance to mock at her and calls her dumb and keeps repeating that she has an image of changing her rooms and forgetting all the wrong that she has done in the past. Sunny tries interfering and stopping the two, but nothing works. Sky goes on to tell Shonali that she is doing nothing but aping Mahek. Shonali could not listen to all that Sky was saying about her and broke down. Amar, Mahek and Siddharth manage to console her and calm her down. As the day ends, we see Siddharth chatting with Pooja Misrra and Sunny and telling them how he does not like anything going wrong around him. While Sidharth is seen saying this outside, Sky bitches to Pooja Bedi and Juhi telling them that Siddharth has changed all of a sudden. When Juhi tells him that it's all because of the game, Sky says that it is not because of the game, but it is generally how Sidharth. He also tells them how Sidharth had made a plan against Juhi and Pooja Bedi and Sky was the one who stopped him and told him he does not want to listen to any of it.; Day 51: Housemates dance to the wake up song. However, things take a turn for the worse a little later. Amar Upadhyay is working out in the exercising area when Mahek Chahal, Sky and Juhi Parmar come there too. Sky starts taunting Amar by saying nasty things about his failed career before the show. Amar does not react. Sky then tells him that he will still continue to suffer once he gets out of Bigg Boss 5. Amar still does not react. Sky then mocks the way Mahek speaks. He then insinuates that Amar is having an affair with Shraddha Sharma. Amar finally loses his cool and yells that all the girls in the house are just his friends. Sky then announces that Amar is also seeing Vida as the two were very friendly. Later in the day, Sky, Siddharth Bhardwaj and Sunny Leone are seen hanging out near the bathroom area. Later in the day, Sky talks to Amar in the captain's room. Sky fakes an apology for his earlier behaviour and starts bitching about Siddharth to him. Sky goes on to call Siddharth's behavior childish and says his immaturity in dealing with girls is visible. Both Amar and Sky discuss how Siddharth has been switching his loyalties among different groups without realising its consequences. Meanwhile, Sunny, Juhi, Pooja Bedi and Siddharth are seen chilling in the garden area, discussing Sunny and her good looks. Juhi comments that Sunny is perfect for Bollywood as she has a charming face, she is cute and innocent and brings much-needed freshness with her. Everyone agrees with Juhi. Sunny smiles and explains that she would love to work in Bollywood, but she knows it is not easy. The others encourage her by saying that she will learn everything on the job and there is no need for her to worry. Sunny and Siddharth mop the floor. Bigg Boss announces the weekly task to the housemates. The housemates have a hearty laugh and move on. The day ends on a happy note, where Sunny is admired and complimented by Juhi and Sky for winning all their hearts. Sky assures her that none of them will vote for her nominations because she is really cute.; Day 53: Sunny is seen sitting with Pooja Bedi on the dining table. She brings up Kim Kardashian's topic and asks Pooja if she knows her real claim to fame. Pooja Bedi gives a witty smile as she responds by saying she knows what Sunny is talking about. Sunny slyly asks her if the Indian audience would accept such a celebrity who is also from an Indian origin. Pooja Bedi tells her that the Indian audience is very conservative and may not support such an act. On the other side Sky, Pooja Bedi and Pooja Misrra strike a conversation. Sky taunts Pooja Misrra by asking her to apologize for the mistakes she had made in the past. Pooja Misrra says she has already apologized whenever she needed to and tells Sky that even he needs to apologize for calling her a dumb woman etc. Pooja Bedi intervenes and tells both of them to calm down and say sorry to each other. The duos agree, say sorry and make up. Mahek is seen gossiping with Sunny in the pink room. Mahek makes Sunny understand that she is not like the others and doesn't feel the need to force her to get her vote for captaincy. She still requests Sunny to feel free and vote for her only if she feels Mahek deserves to be the captain. Meanwhile, in the green room a different game was being played where Siddharth was being assaulted by Sky, Pooja Bedi and Juhi Parmar. After the fight, the captain nominations take place. The new captain for the coming week is appointed. Sky taunts Mahek for being desperate to be captain. He also accuses her of going back on her word of appointing Pooja Misrra as the new captain and teases her by saying that her cruel intentions were caught by him. Mahek gets extremely pissed off and lashes out at Sky's demeaning words. Mahek then breaks down and ides herself in the bathroom. Juhi, Shonali & Amar go and console her. After things cool down a little, Sunny Leone performs a sensual pole dance for all the housemates on a nice and slow track. The housemates have a ball in watching Sunny perform at her best.; Day 54: As soon as the day starts, Siddharth is seen cribbing about how he would not want to follow the orders of the new captain – Pooja Misrra. He tells her how he would not want to do the dishes and would instead take up the responsibility of making lunch with the help of another person. Pooja Misrra sorts this out with Amar and Pooja Bedi and asks Sidharth to cook lunch and not do the dishes instead. Pooja Bedi and Sunny are seen sitting in the garden together when Pooja Bedi asks Sunny to take care of Sky once she is out of the house. Sid and Sky end up having an argument and Sky tells Sidharth what a big 'Copy cat' he is. Sky taunts Sidharth again about the comments that Salman had made last weekend and tells him that how can he still be a part of the house even after so much humiliation. Seeing this Pooja Bedi walks inside the kitchen and asks Siddharth not to find reasons to fight with everyone early in the morning. As the day progresses, Sunny is called in the confession room to talk about her stay in the house. She breaks down while talking about her family and says that she misses them a lot. She says that the contestants inside the house are nothing more than just fellow contestants and that she is hiding her true identity because people around are too judgmental and that if she reveals anything about her life, they will immediately draw a negative image about her. Amar, Shonali, Sidharth and Mahek are seen sitting and imitating Sky, Juhi and Pooja Bedi. Amar and Sidharth imitate how Pooja Bedi advises Sky and Mahek imitates the animated conversation that Juhi and Pooja Bedi always have with each other.
Week 8	Nominations	Sky (Nominated as punishment by Bigg Boss as a result of losing the weekly task); Pooja B. (Nominated by Amar); Mahek (6 votes); Siddharth (4 votes)
Week 8	Bigg Bomb	While Leaving, Pooja B. was asked to save one housemate from next week's nomination. Pooja B. chose Juhi and made her immune from Week 9 eviction.
Week 8	Punishments	Shraddha and Siddharth had 1 vote added to their count prior to the nominations according to the power given to Vida while exiting.
Week 8	Exits	Day 55: Pooja Misrra was ejected from the house by the Bigg Boss after physically assaulting Siddharth.; Day 56: Pooja Bedi was evicted from the house after facing the public vote.
Week 9	Task	Vodafone 123 : Housemates have to play roles according to the services provided to Vodafone customers on dialling 123 on their mobile phones.
Week 9	Happenings	Day 57: The day starts with Sky talking to the housemates post Pooja Misrra's forceful exit about nominating Mahek as the new captain. The housemates start discussing the new nominee for captaincy. While the housemates are debating the same, Bigg Boss announces the new captain of the house according to his discretion. The housemates are a little shocked but accept it without arguing. Post the announcement, the weekly nominations take place where in Bigg Boss calls the captain first to directly nominate a candidate. After that Bigg Boss calls all the boys in the confession room and asks them to nominate two names for direct nomination. This creates confusion amongst the boys, as they find it hard to come to a common conclusion. Finally after a while, the three boys come to a conclusion and arrive at a decision. As usual post the nominations the housemates start the blame game and begin to justify reasons behind the nominations. The housemates keep arguing as they feel it was unfair on the boys to randomly nominate people based on their personal likes and dislikes. In sometime, after things cool down a little Sunny and Sky are seen discussing something rather personal. Sunny whispers to Sky and tells him that he is a really close friend of hers and she can't lie to him anymore. Shonali & Siddharth are then seen in the green room confronting each other. Siddharth blames Shonali for playing a very diplomatic double game with the housemates. He feels that Shonali is very good with twisting her words with time. Shonali retaliates by justifying that she expresses her feelings only to people she is comfortable with. They both argue for a while until Siddharth gets fed up of her nonsense and walks off.; Day 58: The early morning song cheers up everyone in the house. Amar, Sidharth and Sky are seen sitting in the garden and talking when Sky starts pulling Sidharth's leg. He tells Sidharth that he saw Shraddha and Sidharth talk hand in hand and mock unnecessary fun at him. Sidharth retaliates saying it was nothing but a very friendly gesture from Shraddha's side and Sky should not unnecessarily make fun of it. Sidharth walks out of the conversation getting irritated since Sky begins to get personal. After Sidharth goes inside he talks to Shraddha and tells her what had just happened in the garden. He tells Shraddha that Sky is doing nothing but spoiling his image. Mahek is also seen giving tips to Shraddha in a while and tells Shradhha that it is Juhi and Sky who are playing a double game. Seeing this Sky gets irritated with Sidharth and calls Sidharth an 'evil guy' and tells him that now even he will reveal what all Sidharth has spoken about other contestants in the house. Seeing the confusion, Juhi asks Shraddha to confront Sky and cool the matter down. When Shraddha talks to Sky, she understands that the actual was different from what was being portrayed and ends up getting confused and breaks down. Sky tells Shraddha that it was all nothing but a joke. After all the confusion, Shraddha lashes out at Sky and both end up having a huge argument to which the entire house becomes a witness. Sky is so agitated that he threatens to leave the home, to which Sunny adds saying it would not be difficult for Sky to leave the house, but his mother who is watching the show would want him to stay back and fight for his right. Juhi tries calming both down but nothing works. As the day progresses, the entire house is seen upset with all that had happened in the morning. But of all, Sky seemed the most irritated and refuses to do any task. This is when Mahek approaches him to cook dinner and when he refuses, Mahek asks him to cook his own food and eat if he wants to. He asks Mahek to get out of the room which irritates Mahek and she lashes out on him. He disgusts Mahek by calling her names and calling her a loser. To this Sunny says that she can't help smiling and laughing at all these fights. As the day ends, Sunny is seen sitting in the garden with Juhi and Sky trying to tell them about her real identity, but they both refuse to listen and ask her to keep shut. They tell her that whatever she might be, she is their friend at the end of the day and that they love her no matter what.; Day 60: The day begins with everyone in the house waking up in a jolly mood and dancing to the tunes of 'Jadu hai nasha hai' from the movie Jism. Sidharth's hunger strike continues as he does not eat anything and walks around the house in the same gloomy mood. He is called inside the confession room by Bigg Boss in a while and is asked to eat food and break his fast. He confesses to Bigg Boss about how he had felt bad about not being given a fair chance of sorting his fights out with the fellow contestants. Bigg Boss pacifies Sidharth by saying that there is no reason why Sidharth would be treated unequal in the house and that Bigg Boss had no intentions of making him feel so. Soon Sidharth's anger melts away and he breaks his fast by eating fruits. He goes out and talks to Sky about all that had happened in the confession room. As everyone in the house is preparing for lunch, Bigg Boss calls Sunny in the confession room and introduces her to Mahesh Bhatt who has come to the Bigg Boss house to talk to her about 'Jism 2'. Sunny takes Mahesh Bhatt out of the confession room into the house and Mahesh Bhatt meets the other contestants of the house. Mahesh Bhatt greets everyone in the house with a lot of warmth and gratitude and carries along a lot of energy inside the house. He starts conversing with everyone in the house and observes everyone's faces. He greets Sky in a manner that leaves Sky spell bound and joyous throughout the day. Soon Mahesh Bhatt leaves the house and the housemates discuss how it was great to have someone like him amidst them. As the day ends, Sky is seen in a very light and happy mood. He is seen chatting with Sidahrth in the evening talking about how that there are a lot of vibes in the house, but it all depends on them how they take it. In the night, he hugs Juhi, Sunny and Shonali and waves them a Good Night.
Week 9	Nominations	Sky (Nominated by Mahek); Bigg Boss asked Sky, Siddharth and Amar to come to the confession room and asked them to nominate two housemates, Sky protested to the names given by Siddharth and Amar and refuse to be a part of the decision. As a result, the two names decided with the majority consensus were as below: Shraddha; Sunny
Week 9	Bigg Bomb	Prior to her Exit, Shraddha was asked to nominate two names for captaincy in Week 11. She chose Mahek and Amar.
Week 9	Immunity	Juhi was immune from eviction, according to the power given to Pooja B. while exiting, hence Housemates were unable to cast their nominations against her.
Week 9	Exits	Day 63: Shraddha Sharma was evicted from the house after facing the public vote.
Week 10	Task	Jailor Ki Jay Jay Kaydi Ki Haye Haye: The house is turned into a jail with Housemates playing roles of convicts and jailors.
Week 10	Happenings	Day 66: The weekly task of 'Jailer ki jay jay, kaidi ki haye haye' seems to have taken a toll on the contestants. Their involvement in the task has reached nauseating heights. Early in the morning, Mahek tries stealing the locker keys, but due to Sidharth's tight security she fails at doing what she wants to and the two teams end up having an argument. While the two teams were busy arguing, Amar slyly steals the keys and goes to sleep. It is only after sunrise that Shonali and Sidharth realize that the keys have been missing. As the two report the incident to Juhi, Juhi gets agitated and argues over it with Amar, Sky and Mahek. She points a finger at Mahek and Sky saying they are not playing a fair game. Soon Sidharth is very happy since they get a letter from Bigg Boss stating that Amar should return the keys. Once they get the keys back, Sunny gets a heat stroke and starts feeling giddy. Soon Sunny gets out of the jail to sit in the shade for a while and while she's out, she winks at the prisoners inside so that they can utilize this as their chance and steal the keys. Sky makes use of the opportunity and runs to get the keys from the drawer when Shonali runs behind him and asks him to leave the keys. Soon there is a big ruckus created out of the key being stolen and the housemates enter into a huge argument. When the prisoners are asked about the keys, all of them refuse and say that they do not have the keys. In the entire ruckus, Sky throws the keys at Mahek and Juhi assures that Mahek has the keys but she cannot physically go and get the keys. Sunny is seen sitting near the water filter shivering due to her heat stroke when Juhi comes to her and tells her that her act of winking to the prisoners would turn out to be futile for her own self. Sunny replies back to this saying this is a game and that to make her team survive she needed to do it. And also assures Juhi that her heat stroke was not a part of the game plan but it was something really genuine. The day ends on a gloomy note where the all contestants are seen unhappy with the task and refuse to carry on with the task.; Day 67: Juhi & Mahek are seen in the kitchen area where Juhi is preparing some tea. Mahek tries to clear out the previous night's misunderstandings. Initially, Juhi refuses to talk but eventually they discuss as to how the situation in the house is changing steadily and people are becoming immune to any kind of emotional attachments and considering every little thing as a part of the game. Meanwhile, as Mahek and Juhi walk out to the activity area, Mahek slyly tries to steal the locker's keys from the jailers. Unfortunately she doesn't find it in the top drawer, much to Shonali's and Juhi's excitement! As they had intentionally hid it in the second drawer. Mahek laughs at herself and goes into the bathroom. In sometime, Bigg Boss sends out a letter for Juhi to read in front of all the housemates. The letter declared the completion of the weekly task. The jailers were extremely excited whereas the prisoners weren't too happy as the locker keys with the jailers. The housemates get involved with their day-to-day activities. While all are in the house, an announcement is made wherein a flight from Sydney has landed in the activity area. The housemates run to see the face of the latest entrant in the house. The flight opens up and Andrew Symonds walks out of the personal charter. The housemates welcome him with applause, hugs & handshakes. Siddharth of all the housemates is the most excited to see him. A sporting Andrew offers to help the housemates by willing to clean the carpet. The hulky cricketer volunteers to help and does clean the carpet in the verandah. Now that is something nobody in the house has ever done. Sky commented on this behavior by Andrew as he tells Sunny that all this attention he is enjoying would hardly last for than more a week. After sometime all the housemates clarify from Andrew if he was actually a contestant or a guest entry, to which he replies with much assurance. Bigg Boss then announces that he is sending Andrew a gift in the form of a translator. All the housemates get curious to know who or what the translator is. Their inquisitiveness is put to rest as they enter the storeroom to find a sealed wooden box. Amar & Sky open the box to see Pooja Misrra in the box. She was wearing a joker attire. The housemates literally take a step back, especially Siddharth who is astonished to see her. Everyone bursts into laughter and welcome Pooja Misrra back to the house with hugs and embraces. After she meets and greets all the housemates she starts talking about her image in the outside world due to her stay in the big Boss house.; Day 68: The housemates enjoyed the morning via water aerobics in the pool. All were having a hearty laugh and Andrew Symonds too had a ball with his newly made friends. Post the swimming session, Sky and Shonali are seen in the bathroom area. Sky reaches out to Shonali, hugs her and apologises for his rude behavior during the jail task. The two hug and sort out their differences like mature adults. After that Sky and Juhi sit in the captain's room and chat. Sky here convinces Juhi that he did not mean to lie or cheat her at any point of time. He explains to her that it was all for the sake of winning the task. Juhi gets emotional and comments about how she gets affected emotionally only when Sky is in the picture, hearing which Sky apologizes and gives her a tight hug. The duo makes up and things are cool with them again. Little later Pooja Misrra, Sky, Amar & Juhi are hanging out in the captain's room. Here the housemates are all discussing about Pooja Misrra's image that has been created in the outside world. Pooja Misrra tells her side of the harsh reality that she faced after leaving the Bigg Boss house. She adds that, she is an unmarried girl and that is just too much to handle in a society like ours. She also went about how people were comparing her knack of violence with the likes of KRK. She also adds her bit on the embarrassment faced by her family and friends. In a while, the house phone rings, Siddharth is the first one to pick it up so Bigg Boss gives him a special task. After this the captain nomination takes place. A new captain is declared by an election. The daily task was introduced in the form of a small barbecue party organized by Bigg Boss in order to welcome Andrew Symonds and appreciate the completion of the Jail task successfully. Post the party, Mahek bitches about Juhi's self-obsessed nature and how she can stoop to any level in order to demean or degrade anyone. Meanwhile, Siddharth is seen defending his stand on the whole issue and tries to prove his innocence. In the end Siddharth is extremely nervous and goes to Pooja Misrra and apologizes over and over again.
Week 10	Nominations	Housemates were asked to nominate two housemates to make them immune from eviction. Housemates saved Akashdeep and Sunny. Contrary to the result, the remaining housemates who were put up for eviction are listed below: Siddharth; Amar; Mahek; Shonali
Week 10	Bigg Bomb	Prior to her exit, Mahek was asked to choose one housemate to whom she would succeed her captaincy to. Mahek picked Siddharth.
Week 10	Immunity	Akashdeep and Sunny were granted immunity from eviction contrary to the result of the weekly nominations.
Week 10	Exits	Day 70: Mahek Chahal was evicted from the house after facing the public vote.
Week 11	Task	Hookumat-e-Symonds: Housemates had to please and fulfill Andrew Symonds's wishes.
Week 11	Happenings	Day 69 - 70: The day starts with the post-eviction drama in the Bigg Boss house. All the housemates are seen spell bound and astonished as Mahek Chahel was evicted by the public votes. The housemates were expecting Shonali to bid goodbye to the house, thus they were all left in a state of shock. Shonali herself felt that she was getting evicted. Well at the end of the day, it is the public vote that really counts. Amar And Sky are seen bitching about Siddharth and his childlike behavior. After sometime, the housemates are stunned by a new entry from the confession room. It was Siddharth's own mother. Siddharth was speechless as he could not believe his eyes. He got to meet his mother after a few years and that too in the Bigg Boss house. Siddharth hugged his mom really tightly and greeted her with much love. Siddharth's mom was welcomed by all the housemates with much love and respect. Everyone offered her something to eat and drink and made sure she felt comfortable in the house. Siddharth's mother was sitting in the living area of the house along with all the housemates. Sky was at the kitchen counter and he offers Siddharth's mom bread and butter, to which Siddharth's mom responds quite rudely by saying that she doesn't need any buttering and that Sky can come and sit with the rest of the others. After a while, they all are seen in the garden area, and Siddharth's mother picks on Sky yet again and asks his as to why he was so quiet. Sky responds by saying that it was just a gesture of respect for the elders. Siddharth then feels a little uncomfortable about his mom's over protective nature and requests her not to fight his battle. While everyone is amidst something or the other, Bigg Boss calls Sunny into the confession room. He then introduces Sachin Shroff who happens to be Juhi Parmar's husband. Sunny sees him and jumps up with joy! Sunny then goes running into the house, gets Juhi and tells her to keep her eyes closed as she has a surprise for her. In sometime, Madhu who happens to be Sky's sister walks into the house. She meets Sky and the rest of the housemates and spreads loads of joy and happiness in the house. She spreads a message of peace and walks out of the house, after making an impression on each housemate. The next in line was Shiaz - Shonali's boy friend. The young artist came into the house and surprised Shonali completely as she expected her family to visit her. The couple are seen sitting in her room and catching up thoroughly. The couple is interrupted every now and then by Siddharth who is more bothered about his image in the outside world. While everyone is in the relaxing zone, Hetal who is Amar's wife walks into the house. Juhi and Siddharth spot her first and welcome her to the house. The couple who have been married for roughly 13 years meet after two and a half months! Amar is overjoyed to see his better half and doesn't restrain from expressing his emotions.; Day 72: The day starts with a classic wake up song. Sky and Pooja Misrra are relaxing in the garden area and bitching about Sidharth's unruly behavior and negative attitude. Siddharth walks in to the garden area and Sky abuses him in front of all. He calls him names and threatens to beat him up outside the Bigg Boss house in front of the whole world. Siddharth says he is not scared of his dirty threats and shouts back at him. Juhi intervenes and tells both the boys to back off and stop fighting early in the morning. Sky tells Siddharth to back off and finally the duo are detached from each other as Shonali and Amar intervene and push them apart. After this fight, Sky and Amar unite and decide to discontinue the task assigned to them. They blame Siddharth for ruining their sleep and for being a bad captain and decide to boycott the task so that the captain realizes his mistake. Sunny who is the king's (Symonds) advisor informs the same to the king. Siddharth tries to convince Amar to help him with the task as he doesn't have any personal grudges with him. Amar denies his request and expresses his anger as he could sleep only for one hour due to the erratic fight late at night. The king then calls Amar and Sky in front of Sunny and asks them if they would continue the task assigned to them. Both the boys express that they would do all the household chores but not the task as they had decided to boycott the captain. Symonds is seen rehearsing for the task along with Siddharth, Juhi, Amar and Sky. Everyone teaches Symonds his dialogues so he can be prepared at the time of the task. Sunny is dressed as Mehbooba. She performs a sensual dance which brings a smile to all the housemates. The rest of the housemates too perform their acts in an impressive manner. The housemates have a blast during the task. Post the task all the housemates are tired and go to sleep. Sky, Suuny, Amar, Pooja Misrra and Shonali take an apple, put a candle in it and surprise Juhi for her birthday. Everyone sings for her, wish her and leave the room.
Week 11	Nominations	Before leaving the Family/Friends of the housemates, who came for a short visit to meet their loved ones, were asked to nominate two names for eviction excluding Pooja Misrra, Siddharth Bhardwaj and Andrew Symonds. The two housemates which got the most votes were as following: Amar (4 votes); Shonali (3 votes)
Week 11	Punishments	Siddharth was removed as Captain for not dedicating enough commitment towards the duties and responsibilities of his captaincy.; Bigg Boss announced that according to his observations the post of the house captain is only being taken upon as an excuse for escaping nominations and gaining special rights for the week which he strictly dislikes and as a result, captaincy wouldn't be allocated to any housemate until his further notice.
Week 11	Bigg Bomb	When leaving, Shonali was giving a special power by the name of 'Bigg Bomb' and had to choose one housemate to cook food for everyone for the rest of the week. Shonali chose Sky.
Week 11	Exits	Day 77: Shonali Nagrani was evicted from the house after facing the public vote.
Week 12	Task	Dhinchak Dhinchak Dhinchak Dhin: Housemates had to dance on their respective songs on a round platform when the songs are played.
Week 12	Happenings	Day 77 & 78: Everyone in the house is seen sad and gloomy after evictions since Salman Khan spoke to each contestant personally and showed them a mirror. After the grilling session, the housemates say that they would not do anything in the house except for actively participating in the tasks. Carrying on in the gloomy mood, Amar and Pooja Misrra are seen bitching bout Juhi and her self-centeredness in the pink room. Soon Symonds and Pooja Misrra are asked to lease the house since they were not contestants but were guests on the show. While Andrew is ready and is waiting for Pooja Misrra, Sidharth manages to get time to talk to Symonds and Symonds advises Sidharth to play the game sensibly henceforth and act a little matured and live up to all that Salman has advised him to. While Pooja Misrra packs her bags, Sunny and Amar tell her that this time she can strut out with her head held high. While the two are seen leaving, Juhi asks Symonds to enact Aati kya Khandala once again and Andrew does it perfectly this time to which all the contestants are seen applauding. As the day progresses and eviction nominations take place, post which a little negative vibe is felt in the house. Amar and Sidharth bitch about Sky the trio - Juhi, Sunny and Sky, whereas the trio is seen bitching about Amar and the double games he has been playing. Sky then confronts Amar and asks him of what games is her trying to play to which Amar replies back saying he is not here to make relationships or friends, but to play a game and is doing just that. He says that he is playing games and is quite open about the fact. At the end of the day, Bigg Boss announces that the now since there are only 5 members in the house, the contestants can all stay together in the Pink room and the green Room will remain shut. Sky, Sunny and Juhi are seen cribbing about it but Amar is seen quite happy as he takes this to be lesson for the trio who would have never wanted to leave their green room and come. As the day ends, we see Sunny and Juhi having a dialogue with the camera where Sunny enacts kicking all the boys out of the house and surviving until the end of the show saying women are no less and are strong enough contenders to win the show.; Day 81: The day begins in the Bigg Boss house and Juhi, Sunny and Sky are seen giving each other a group hug and are happy to see each other around. After breakfast, Sky and Juhi are seen sitting in the garden area talking about Amar and his "wanna-be" nature. Soon, Amar joins the two and Sky turns the tables and tells Amar that he was just discussing him Juhi and was all praises about him. In a short while, all the five contestants are lounging out in the garden when Amar and Sky subtly start arguing carrying on with last night's argument. Sky did not like the way Amar stole his thunder last night and started performing on his song wearing Sky's clothes. Sky picked this up as an opportunity to pounce on Amar. Once Sky move out of scene, Amar and Sidharth get talking about how Sky has now overdone his stay in the house. Amar tells Sidharth that his jokes are completely nonsensical and that his time on the show has ended and that soon, it should be his turn to pack bags and go back. As the day progresses, the entire house is seen getting into the task mood. Juhi and Sunny end up enacting a mock fight as they are in the task fervor. The two are then seen taking Sidharth and Amar's case. As the day progresses, Sunny, Sky and Juhi discuss about Amar and his touchy mannerisms. Sunny tells Sky that she does not like the way Amar was being touchy with the girls during the task. Sky replies back in affirmative saying there was no need of him to do so. As the day ends, Juhi and Sunny are seen picking on the men again and enact the fight Sky and Amar have in the morning. The two hilariously take the center stage and repeat all that had been boiling between Amar and Sky by making every contestant in the house laugh.; Day 82: The day begins on a very chirpy note in the house. Amar is seen grooving while Sunny and Sky exchange pleasantries. Sidharth and Amar are seen discussing how both of them have been playing games lately and have been doing all of it for their own good. All five are sitting in the garden discussing Amar and Juhi's dance when Sky pulls Amar leg by asking the women if Amar's dance looked desperate or no. Amar takes it up from here stating that the girls will obviously agree and starts pointing out at the chemistry the trio (Juhi, Sky and Sunny) share. Sky, continuing with the humor plays around with Amar when the two are just chilling in the afternoon playing with the phones that have been given to them as props. Sky quizzes Amar on what would Amar do if he wins finale and tries to pull Amar down. As Amar enters the pink room in the afternoon, Sky is seen sitting there chatting with the girls. Once Amar enters, Sky points it out to the girls that Amar thinks of the girls in the house to be weaklings which Amar pounces back saying Sky is the one who has disrespected women the most on the show. Sky again invites Juhi and Sunny to comment on the topic and Juhi takes no time to jump into the argument and agree to the fact that Amar has been calling the women of the house as weaklings. Amar walks out of the scene and accuses Sky of creating unnecessary drama in the house. Sky laughs it off and pays no attention to what Amar has been saying. Sidharth tries to gain momentum in the fight and tries to talk to Amar about the issue, but Amar plays smart and does not open up much with him. The three boys are seen sitting outside and talking and Sky behaves as if he has forgotten everything. Seeing this Juhi says she can never understand Sky's behavior. The contestants are seen discussing the same argument entire evening apart from their tasks and the day comes to an end with all the contestants in the house being divided into groups and trying to play their own games.
Week 12	Nominations	Amar (3 votes); Siddharth (3 votes); Juhi (2 votes); Sunny (2 votes)
Week 12	Punishments	Akashdeep had to cook food for all housemates alone according to the power given to Shonali while exiting.
Week 12	Exits	Day 78: Andrew Symonds and Pooja Misrra were asked to leave the house by the Bigg Boss after staying for eleven days inside the house.; Voting lines were closed, hence, no housemate was evicted as a present from Bigg Boss on Christmas Eve.
Week 13	Task	Paathshaala Ka Bol Baala: The house is turned into a school. Juhi Parmar was made the Head-mistress of the school and other contestants played students and teachers.
Week 13	Happenings	Day 84: Earlier evicted housemate Mahek Chahal returned to the house, through a "Wildcard Voting Contest", disguised as a Santa Claus.; Day 87: The day opens on a very lively song 'Tunak Tunak' to which every contestant is seen grooving. The Punjabi song hits off a conversation between the two Punjabi kudis in the house – Mahek and Sunny, as Mahek starts asking Sunny about which part of Punjab does she belong to and the two discuss about Sunny's extended family staying in a remote part of Punjab. As the day progresses, Amar, Sidharth and Mahek discuss who will leave the house this weekend. Mahek starts talking about Sky and his self-centeredness. The trio continues to discuss about how Sky would use steroids once out of the house to get back in shape since after coming into the house, he's lost his bulky figure. Sunny, while talking to Sky mentions how she watched the show before entering and how she would only and solely watch fights throughout the show. The three discuss that while the fight, Pooja Misrra was all calm and very composed and managed herself well throughout the fight. Bigg Boss gives the housemates a chance to watch one of their moments in the house, when Amar gets to watch his fight with Pooja Misrra over bangles. After watching the clip, Amar starts feeling bad and is upset over how he fought with Pooja Misrra. He apologizes to the entire house and repents his fights with everyone and says that he totally agrees with Salman when Salman spoke of how these fights look pathetic. Soon after Amar apologizes to the trio, he walks out of the garden area to the room as he begins to feel awkward. Sky goes behind him and pacifies him saying all of them have behaved just the same and that he does not need to feel awkward about any of it. As the day ends, Sky is seen suspecting Amar and Sidharth of receiving a secret task and talks of same to Juhi. Sky is seen going to sleep with suspicion in mind about Amar's secret task and spreads it across to Juhi as well.; Day 89: As the day begins, starts Sidharth's and Amar's picking on Sky. The two again fool Sky by a fake secret task. As the scene shifts, we see Mahek bitching about Amar to Sidharth and called him spineless while reiterating the fact that he is just too desperate to win the show. In the afternoon, Amar is seen bitching to Sky about Sidharth. The two talk about how Sidharth is way too aggressive and childish in his behavior. The two get talking about how much he has lied on the show. Amar tells Sky that he regrets backing Sidharth. Looking at the two men talking, Sidharth tells Juhi and Mahek that the 'Jai and Veeru' bonding is back in action. Once Amar comes back into the room, Sidharth asks Amar if he has gone and spoken any of their discussions to Sky. Amar immediately retaliates listening to this and says he was not sitting with Sky to talk about others. Mahek tells him that he has played double-faced earlier and hence this doubt now. The trio ends up having an argument over the same. As the day progresses, Sunny tells Juhi that Sidharth has not completed his part of house cleaning which stops her from finishing her work. Juhi takes this up with Sidharth and soon the entire house is seen rolling into it. Mahek and Juhi have an argument and Sky has an argument with Sidharth over the issue. Soon Mahek takes Sidharth to the pink room and calms him down, but when Sidharth comes out, he sees Sunny and Sky doing his part of the house cleaning. This irritates him all the more but he makes sure that since he hasn't done his work, he compensates by cooking dinner. In the evening, Sidharth is seen going up to Juhi and patching up with her. The two hug and apologize to each other and forget all their differences. After the patch up, Juhi is seen discussing it with Amar over dishwashing saying she does not understand Sidharth. Amar said it was all nothing but an emotional ride for Sidharth in which he came up to Juhi and patched up with her. As the day ends, Sky and gang are seen sitting in the garden area and discussing about the evening drama. Juhi tells Sky that she is happy being with him as he is such a clean-hearted man. The two also discuss about how Sidharth is good only from a distance. Juhi tells Sky that in case anything pops up in the future with Sidharth, she will just put Sky on the front to sort it out with him.
Week 13	Nominations	Bigg Boss nominated all housemates to give them all an equal chance of going to the final week. Hence, the nomination process was not opted. Housemates nominated for the week were as follows: Akashdeep; Amar; Siddharth; Juhi; Mahek; Sunny
Week 13	Exits	Day 91: Sunny Leone was evicted from the house after facing the public vote.
Final Week 14	Task	Kamaal Kursi Ka: Housemates had taken control of a Royal Chair and once any one of them has sat on it, other housemates shall become his/her servants. The task was cancelled before it could come to its end due to Mahek and Siddharth's breaking of task rules and uncivil behaviour towards other housemates during their rules.; Lollipop Se Karo Talk: Lollipop stand with the photos of evicted housemates were provided to the finalists. Each housemate had to equip at least one lollipop stand and had impersonate the housemate whose photo is depicted on it and talk through it to other housemates.
Final Week 14	Happenings	Day 90 & 91: As Sunny leaves the house, the final five contestants are seen rejoicing and are happy as they have entered the finale list. Soon, the men are made to dress up for their Bigg wrestle and once the men see the giant sumo they would wrestle, all of them end up giving scared reactions. Sidharth is assigned the task of attending to the special guest in the house. Sidharth soon starts interacting with Yama and manages to become friends with him. In the evening, as the contestants relax after dinner, they ask Yama to sing a Japanese song. He very cutely sings a Japanese song for the contestants and soon everyone in the house starts singing with him. They teach him 'Aati Kya Khandala' and he repeats after them. After the singing, they teach him how to dance and he grooves with them too. They teach him to do Salman's step from the movie 'Dabangg'. As the next day begins, the wake up song 'Sayonara' makes Yama happy and he begins humming the song. He soon jumps into the swimming pool, and Amar and Sky cannot help but make fun of the way all the water splashed out of the swimming pool. The two tell him how it felt like a mini tsunami once he jumped inside the swimming pool. In the afternoon, Yama's lunch is sent inside the house. The entire house is shocked to see how Yama's food is sent in steel buckets. Looking at the way Bigg Boss has sent lunch, Yama is shocked. In the evening, the contestants start talking to Yama about his love life back in Japan. In a while, Sidharth takes a red balloon and starts teasing Yama after Yama talks about his love life. The two have fun and are seen enjoying the moment. In the night, Bigg Boss sends in dinner for Yama and asks all the contestants to serve him food the Indian way. Yama enjoys being treated well but at the same time very sweetly asks all the other contestants to enjoy their dinner too. In the night, Sky taunts Amar along with Juhi about how Amar is always happy when a contestant is asked to pack bags and leave the house.; Day 93: The day begins with an apt number of 'Paisa Paisa' with the TV displaying '5 days to go' and '1, 00, 00,000/-'. As the contestants walk outside, they notice a bag filled with cash put in the garden area, and soon they understand that they have an open option of walking out with the cash in case any of them think they are not going to win. Seeing this Siddharth discusses with Mahek how the money would increase by the day so that it will tempt them more to leave. As the day progresses, Siddharth Bhardwaj and Sky aka Akashdeep Saigal are seen getting into a small banter and due to a task. Mahek Chahal, Juhi Parmar and Amar Upadhyay roll into the banter too and soon each of them are seen supporting their friends on the show. As a result of the argument that happened in the afternoon, Mahek and Sky start arguing about how each of them have been after each other's lives always. Sky taunts Mahek about her coming back at Sky for all that he had done to her earlier on the show. Sky tells Mahek that she should stop avenging him. Mahek returns the favor back to Sky by telling him that he should stop accusing her for things she is not doing. In the evening, since the entire house had a very negative day, all of them sit down to discuss about their best experiences in the house. Siddharth talks about how his best moment was when Mahek told him that he has managed to win her heart. Juhi discusses about her best moment being her husband walking into the house and being with her. Sky discusses how his best moment was when Pooja Bedi showed that concern for him while he was down and the entire house was pointing a finger at him but only Pooja Bedi was the one who asked him to stand strong. As the day ends, Sid and Mahek are seen discussing Amar and his spineless behavior. Sid tells Mahek that just a few days back it was Sky who was taunting Amar and making fun about his family, wife and kids and now Amar has turned out to be gelling well with the man again. Sid tells Mahek that he feels ashamed of supporting Amar while all of this was going on. He says, that now when Sky is being sweet, it took no time for Amar to stop being with them and bitching about them to Sky.; Day 94: The day begins on a very competitive song of 'Muqqabla' as it is an indication for the housemates that the show is nearing its end and soon a winner will be announced. The house continues on the same note as last night's. The trio – Juhi Parmar, Amar Upadhyay and Sky aka Akashdeep Saigal, continue to be irritated with Mahek Chahal and Siddharth Bhardwaj after all that had happened the day before. Sid continues to throw weight around and orders Juhi to get him tea and Amar to wash his cup to which both revolt and soon Sky joins them in too. Soon, Mahek and Sid head to their room and the trio follow them trying to listen to their conversation and taunt them. While Juhi, Amar and Sky taunt them, Sid maintains his stance of not getting into a fight unnecessarily with anyone around. The entire house remains silent for a while but very soon starts interacting and having fun with each other. They all imitate the evicted contestants and recall old memories of how each one would fight over something or the other. In the evening, Sid is seen apologising to Amar and Sky about all the wrongs he has done so far in the show. Amar reacts well and is warm and apologises back while he also taunts him saying Sid has actually hurt him a lot. When Sid approaches Sky, Sky is little cold but smiles and agrees to forget everything too. As time passes, Sky has an outburst where he thinks Sid did not respect him and vents it out first in front of Juhi and Amar and tells them that he will go and clear the same out. Juhi and Amar try to stop him and ask him not to unnecessarily approach Sid and elongate the drama, but he does not listen. Sky goes out and tells Sid how he was the one who saved Sid from kicking Pooja Mishra and getting out of the show for being violent. Sky tells him that if it wasn't for him, Sid would not have been a part of the show any more. Seeing all Sky's outburst, Juhi cribs about how she tried stopping him and tried talking to him but he just would not listen. The day ends on a very awkward note where all the housemates are seen not talking or interacting with each other and suddenly the lights go off.
Final Week 14	Finalists	During the final week the public voted for who they wanted to win Bigg Boss. The finalists for the title were as following: Akashdeep; Amar; Siddharth; Juhi; Mahek
Final Week 14	Winner	Juhi Parmar
Final Week 14	Runner-Up	Mahek Chahal
Final Week 14	Third Place	Siddharth Bhardwaj
Final Week 14	Fourth Place	Akashdeep Saigal
Final Week 14	Fifth Place	Amar Upadhyay

== Weekly tasks ==
Task No.	Date given	Description	Result	
1	4 October 2011 (Day 02)	Pahiya Ghumao Kismat Chamkao; The task involves contestants teaming up for the rest of the week to fulfill the objective and earn points that will help determine their budgeting and rationing for the coming week. The task involves them riding a rickshaw and taking it to different cities that are marked on a map that is provided to the contestants. The contestants will then perform an act based on the peculiarities of the city that they have reached. In between the performances, at all times i.e. 24x7, someone will have to lead the rickshaw and keep pedaling so that the street lamp placed beside the cycle rickshaw remains lit. (100% bet of weekly luxury budget)	Passed	
2	10 October 2011 (Day 7)	Jiska Kaam Usi Ko Saanjhay; All the contestants were allotted some official household duties. Juhi was made the PR of Bigg Boss and it is her duty to keep a track of everyone's performance. Gulabo was the head cook and had two kitchen assistants to help her. Shakti and Vida were in charge of security. Amar, Shonali and Raageshwari became the washroom attendants. Mahek and Shraddha were supposed to clean the house and the garden area. Pooja Bedi and Pooja Mishra formed the dishwashing team. (0% bet of the weekly luxury budget)	Failed	
3	18 October 2011 (Day 16)	Mai Chotta Sa Nanha Sa Bachcha Hu; All the contestants were allotted a role of a parent or a child. A Parent will have to take care of their respective child. Amar, Pooja M, Laxmi, Shonali, Vida and Mahek were given the role of parents whereas Shakti, as applauded on her outstanding performance during the task, however, Siddharth, Pooja Misrra and Shraddha displayed inconsistent performances. As a result, their luxury budget points (200 pts. from each) were cut. Shakti and Shonali were also told of their irregular roles in the task and hence 100 pts from both were not allotted. The housemates, overall, managed to grab 1800 points out of 2600. (70% bet of the weekly luxury budget)	Passed	
4	25 October 2011 (Day 23)	Diya Jalay Tou Diwali Nahi Jalay Tou Diwala; To celebrate Diwali, the contestants were split into teams of two and asked to make candles (Diyaas). The team that will achieve the target of making 500 candles first, will be declared winner of the task. The housemates have to make 2000 diyas in one week. They have been provided a machine for the same. They were given a demonstration on the procedure of using the machine. Only one housemate can make diyaas on the machine at a time. The diyaas can be shaped from the wet clay even manually. Team 1 : Amar, Pooja B., Shonali, Shakti, Vida, Juhi. Team 2 : Siddharth, Laxmi, Pooja M., Shraddha, Mandeep and Akaashdeep. (??% bet of the weekly luxury budget)	Passed	
5	1 November 2011 (Day 30)	Lambee Hai Dooree, Chadhhna Zarooree; Bigg Boss house was converted to an army camp where the housemates were trainees and Mandeep was made the Drill instructor. The task is associated with Wall climbing and a crash obstacle course was set up for the housemates. Housemates had to cover 12000 ft hiking on a 20 feet wall created in the Activity area inside the house. Housemates are also instructed to wear Boot Camp uniforms as a part of the task. Bigg Boss announced that housemates have failed to accomplish the task due to the in-cooperative behavior of Mandeep as Colonel. Siddharth also inhibited irrelevant traits as opposed to the task i.e. Sleeping. Bigg Boss also stated that the only people who tried to do justice to the weekly task were Pooja B. and Amar. (0% bet of the weekly luxury budget)	Failed	
6	8 November 2011 (Day 37)	Shraddha Ki Riyaasat; Shraddha will be treated as a queen and the rest will be her attendants. They've to call her Rajkumari. Every morning when Shraddha wakes up two of the housemates have to come to her and take her blessings. All her orders are essential to be acted upon otherwise the housemates might be locked into the jail as punishment. Every night all housemates have to line up to her room and praise her one by one. Sky was praised on performing the task with consistency, however, Shraddha was detested by the Bigg Boss due to her incorrect role play as the Queen. Bigg Boss rewarded 2200 points to the housemates. (100% bet of the weekly luxury budget)	Passed	
			Team Amar	Team Sky
7	15 November 2011 (Day 44)	Raajneeti; Housemates formed two teams - Team Amar and Team Sky. Pooja M., Pooja B., Shraddha and Mahek under the leadership of Amar formed a team namely No Jhagra No bayhes, We are Shanti in Progress. On the other hand, Juhi, Siddharth, Vida and Shonali joined Akashdeep's team Band Mutthi Haath ki. According to the phone call from Bigg Boss, which Akashdeep (Sky) attended, Shonali was told to form alliance with Amar's team. On Day 47, Amar's team with the majority of votes won the election with the vote count 6 - 4. As a result, Amar was rewarded by being made the captain of the house for the coming week and his team granted full luxury budget.	Passed	Failed
8	22 November 2011 (Day 51)	Haseena Teri Misaal Kahan; Boys are made mentors and have to form three teams. Amar selects Juhi, Shonali and Shraddha. Sky chooses Pooja M. and Pooja B. and Siddharth chose Mahek and Sunny. Girls referred as "Beauties" are given titles and have to wear sashes with their title label on it for the whole week. Bigg Boss granted 1500 points to the housemates.: Titles allotted as per the Task / Beauty; Miss Meethi chhuri / Pooja Bedi; Miss Namkeen / Sunny Leone; Miss Patakha / Shraddha Sharma; Miss Hasmukh / Pooja Misrra; Miss Mirchi / Shonali Nagrani; Miss Chikni chupri / Mahek Chahal; Miss Nakhrail / Juhi Parmar; Team Amar Team Sky Team Siddharth	Passed	
9	30 November 2011 (Day 58)	Vodafone 1 2 3 The task involves housemates to play various roles such as astrologer, match-making, chef, sports commentator and spicy gossip reporter by dialling 123 on the Vodafone Applet stored inside the house. (100% bet of weekly luxury budget)	Passed	
			Jailors	Convicts
10	7 December 2011 (Day 65)	Jailor Ki Jay Jay Kaydi Ki Haye Haye; Bigg Boss has turned the house into a jail. All the contestants have been provided appropriate costumes for the task. The criminals are supposed to sleep in the new jail created in the garden area. One of the jailers has to awake and keep an eye on the prisoners. The prisoners have been asked to steal an envelope from jailer's cupboard, and the jailers are supposed to stop them.: Jailors / Convicts; Juhi Parmar / Mahek Chahal; Shonali Nagrani / Sunny Leone; Siddharth Bhardwaj / Amar Upadhyay; / Akashdeep Saighal	Passed	Failed
11	12 December 2011 (Day 72)	Hookumat-e-Symonds; As a part of their weekly task, housemates have to please and fulfill Andrew Symonds's wishes. Part 1: Housemates / Role Played; Andrew Symonds / King; Sunny Leone / Personal Advisor; Juhi Parmar / Servants; Shonali Nagrani / Servants; Pooja Misrra / Servants; Siddharth Bhardwaj / Soldiers; Amar Upadhyay / Soldiers; Akashdeep Saighal / Soldiers; Part 2: Housemates / Character; Andrew Symonds / Gabbar; Sunny Leone / Kabeli Dancer; Juhi Parmar / Kaaliya; Shonali Nagrani / Saamba; Pooja Misrra / Basantii; Siddharth Bhardwaj / Thaakur; Amar Upadhyay / Veeru; Akashdeep Saighal / Jayy; Bigg Boss rewarded 1600 points to the housemates. (100% of the weekly luxury budget)	Passed	
12	20 December 2011 (Day 79)	Dhinchak Dhinchak Dhinchak Dhin; Housemates were told to dance on solo and group on songs on a round platform in front of the pool facing the camera. Each housemate was given a specific song according to the theme which changed daily.: Day / Theme; 1 / Regional; 2 / Adlaa Badlii; 3 / Tarak Bharak Nazaray	Passed	
13	27 December 2011 (Day 86)	Paatshaala Ka Bol Baala; The House was turned into a school and housemates students. Desks and a blackboard were placed in the garden area. Uniforms were provided and Juhi was made the headmistress. Other housemates were to take turns in acting as teachers for the subjects allocated. Occasionally Quiz competitions took place as a part of the class.	Passed	
14	3 January 2012 (Day 93)	Kamaal Kursi Ka; Housemates were provided a Royal Chair which was placed in the garden area near the pool. The housemate who sits on the chair is made the King/Queen of the house and all other inmates his/her servants. If for any particular reason the housemate leaves the chair, anyone else can claim possession of it and the rule of the latter will begin with the rule of the preceder coming to an end. The housemate with the most favorable rule is awarded by the Bigg Boss. However, due to consistent breaking of rules by Mahek and Siddharth and their unsuccessful rule on their temporary kingdoms the task was cancelled and Bigg Boss decided to deprive both of them of any awards promised.	Cancelled	
14	4 January 2012 (Day 94)	Lollipop Se Karo Talk; Housemates were provided lollipop stands, each with a photo of an evicted housemate. The stands were placed in the garden area. Each housemate had to equip at least one lollipop stand and impersonate the housemate whose photo is depicted on it and talk through it to other housemates.	Passed	

== Nominations table ==
	Week 1	Week 2	Week 3	Week 4	Week 5	Week 6	Week 7	Week 8	Week 9	Week 10	Week 11	Week 12	Week 13	Week 14	
Nominated for Captain	None		Amar; Mandeep	Pooja B Shonali	None	Pooja M Shraddha	None		Mahek; Pooja M	Juhi; Sunny	~~Amar~~; Maheh; Sidharth	Post Abolished as Punishment			
House Captain	Shakti		Mandeep	Shonali		Shraddha	Akashdeep	Amar	~~Pooja M~~; Mahek	Juhi	~~Mahek~~; Sidharth	Post Abolished as Punishment			
Captain's Nominations	Laxmi; Gulabo; Pooja M Nihita	Mandeep (to save)	Mahek	Mahek	Pooja M	Akashdeep	Shraddha; Pooja M Vida; Shonali	Pooja B	Akashdeep	Refused to vote	Not eligible	Post Abolished as Punishment			
Jail Punishment	Mandeep	Pooja B	None	Sidharth	None	Amar; Vida	Pooja M Amar; Mahek	None							
Vote to:	Evict									Save	None	Evict	None	WIN	
Juhi	Pooja M Nihita	Pooja M Gulabo	Amar; Laxmi	Shraddha; Pooja M	Amar; Pooja M	Pooja M Mahek	Not eligible	Mahek; Pooja M	Not eligible	House; Captain	Not eligible	Sidharth; Pooja M	No; Nominations	No; Nominations	Winner (Day 98)
Mahek	Pooja M Gulabo	Pooja M Gulabo	Shonali; Pooja M	Shakti; Pooja M	Shraddha; Mandeep	Pooja M Shonali	Not eligible	Shonali; Pooja M	House; Captain	Akashdeep; Pooja M	Evicted (Day 70)		No; Nominations	No; Nominations	1st runner-up (Day 98)
Sidharth	Not In House		Exempt	Shraddha; Pooja M	Pooja M Mahek	Mahek; Pooja M	Not eligible	Shraddha; Mahek	Shraddha; Pooja M	Mahek; Pooja M	Not eligible	Sunny; Juhi	No; Nominations	No; Nominations	2nd runner-up (Day 98)
Akashdeep	Not In House				Amar; Mahek	Laxmi; Pooja M	House; Captain	Pooja M Mahek	Refused to vote	Pooja M Amar	Not eligible	Sidharth; Pooja M	No; Nominations	No; Nominations	3rd runner-up (Day 98)
Amar	Not In House	Exempt	Pooja M Shonali	Pooja B Shakti	Mandeep; Pooja M	Pooja M Pooja B	Not eligible	House; Captain	Shraddha; Pooja M	Pooja M Akahsdeep	Not eligible	Sunny; Pooja M	No; Nominations	No; Nominations	4th runner-up (Day 98)
Pooja M	Mahek; Gulabo	Pooja B Mahek	Pooja B Mahek	Shakti; Mahek	Akashdeep; Mahek	Mahek; Laxmi	Not eligible	Sidharth; Mahek	Sidharth; Amar	Amar; Mahek	No; Nominations	Amar; Sunny	No; Nominations	No; Nominations	Ejected (Day 95)
Sunny	Not In House							Exempt	Not eligible	Pooja M Shonali	Not eligible	Sidharth; Pooja M	No; Nominations	Evicted (Day 91)	
Shonali	Pooja M Gulabo	Pooja M Shraddha	Mahek; Pooja M	House; Captain		Mahek, Pooja M	Not eligible	Pooja M Mahek	Not eligible	Not eligible	Pooja M Amar (to evict)	Evicted (Day 77)			
Shraddha	Laxmi; Nihita	Pooja M Mandeep	Laxmi; Pooja M	Pooja M Juhi	Pooja M Mahek	House; Captain	Not eligible	Juhi; Sidharth	Not eligible	Mahek; Pooja M (to evict)	Evicted (Day 63)				
Pooja B	Pooja M Nihita	Pooja M Shraddha	Amar; Mahek	Pooja M Shraddha	Pooja M Mandeep	Mahek; Pooja M	Not eligible	Mahek; Pooja M	Juhi (to save)	Evicted (Day 56)					
Vida	Pooja M Gulabo	Pooja M Mandeep	Amar; Shraddha	Pooja M Shraddha	Pooja M Shraddha	Mahek; Pooja M	Not eligible	Pooja M Sidharth (to evict)	Evicted (Day 49)						
Laxmi	Not eligible	Pooja M Gulabo	Shonali; Juhi	Shakti; Pooja M	Mandeep; Pooja M	Pooja M Shonali	Mahek (to save)	Evicted (Day 42)							
Mandeep	Laxmi; Pooja M	Laxmi; Pooja M	House; Captain	Pooja M Juhi	Pooja M Mahek	Sidharth (to save)	Evicted (Day 35)								
Shakti	House; Captain		Mahek; Juhi	Pooja M Juhi	Pooja M Amar (to evict)	Evicted (Day 28)									
Raageshwari	Pooja M Nihita	Pooja M Mandeep	Pooja M Mahek	Evicted (Day 21)											
Gulabo	Not eligible	Pooja M Mandeep	Evicted (Day 14)												
Sonika	Pooja M Nihita	Walked (Day 8)													
Nihita	Pooja M Juhi	Evicted (Day 7)													
Family Members
Anuradha											Akashdeep; Amar				
Hetal											Shonali; Pooja M				
Madhu											Pooja M Shonali				
Sachin											Pooja M Shonali				
Shiraz											Sunny; Pooja M				
Notes	1	2	3	4	5	6	7	8	9	10	11	12	13	14	
Against Public Vote	Nihita; Pooja M	Gulabo; ~~Mandeep~~; Pooja M	Amar; Juhi; Mahek; Pooja M Raageshwari; Shonali	Mahek; Pooja M Shakti; Shraddha	Amar; Mahek; Mandeep; Pooja M	Akashdeep; Laxmi; Mahek; Pooja M	Pooja M Shonali; Shraddha; Vida	Akashdeep; Mahek; Pooja B Pooja M Sidharth	Akashdeep; Pooja M Shraddha	Mahek; Pooja M Sidharth; Shonali	Pooja M Shonali	Amar; Juhi; Sidharth; Pooja M Sunny	Akashdeep; Amar; Juhi; Mahek; Pooja M Sidharth; Sunny	Akashdeep; Amar; Juhi; Mahek; ~~Pooja M~~; Sidharth	
Re-entered	None										Mahek	None			
Guest	None												None		
Walked	None	Sonika	None												
Ejected	None													Pooja M	
Evicted	Nihita	Gulabo	Raageshwari	Shakti	Mandeep	Laxmi	Vida	Pooja B	Shraddha	Mahek	Shonali	No; Eviction	Sunny	Amar	Akashdeep
Evicted	Nihita	Gulabo	Raageshwari	Shakti	Mandeep	Laxmi	Vida	Pooja B	Shraddha	Mahek	Shonali	No; Eviction	Sunny	Sidharth	
Evicted	Nihita	Gulabo	Raageshwari	Shakti	Mandeep	Laxmi	Vida	Pooja B	Shraddha	Mahek	Shonali	No; Eviction	Sunny	Mahek	Juhi

Color Key

The colors are used to denote the housemate and their family member used for nomination in week 11.

indicates the House Captain.
indicates that the Housemate was directly nominated for eviction prior to the regular nominations process.
indicates that the housemate has Re-Entered.
indicates that the person was saved by another housemate.
indicates that the housemate has been granted immunity from nominations.
indicates that the housemate was in the caravan or secret room.
indicates that the housemate entered as a wild card entrant.
indicates that the housemate has been declared as the winner.
indicates that the housemate has been declared as the first runner-up.
indicates that the housemate has been declared as the second runner-up.
indicates that the housemate has been declared as the third runner-up.
indicates that the housemate has been declared as the fourth runner-up.
indicates the contestant has been evicted.
indicates the contestant has been walked out of the show.
indicates the housemate was ejected.
indicates Sunny's family didn’t come to meet her I’m week 11, hence no one could nominate two housemates for eviction on her behalf.

=== Nomination notes ===
- ^1: Shakti as captain was asked to appoint four names from the remaining housemates who would be Up for Nomination. As a result of being chosen Laxmi, Gulabo, Nihita and Pooja M. were exempt from nominating for this week, however, the remaining 9 housemates were allowed to cast their votes. Remaining housemates nominated Pooja M. and Nihita.
- ^2: Housemates nominated Pooja M., Gulabo and Mandeep however, according to the power given to Shakti as captain, he was able to save a nominated housemate from eviction. Shakti chose Mandeep.
- ^3: Pooja M. and Raageshwari were nominated by Bigg Boss as a punishment. Housemates were unable to cast their nominations against them. Mandeep as captain nominated Mahek directly placing her against public vote. Remaining housemates nominated Amar, Juhi and Shonali.
- ^4: Shonali was safe as captain, Housemates were unable to cast their nominations against her. Shonali nominated Mahek directly placing her against public vote. Remaining housemates nominated Shakti, Shraddha and Pooja B.
- ^5: Shonali was safe for another week as captain, Housemates were unable to cast their nominations against her. Shonali nominated Pooja M. directly placing her against public vote. Remaining housemates nominated Mahek, Mandeep and Amar.
- ^6: Shraddha was safe as captain and Sidharth was immune from nominations because Mandeep took his name when Bigg Boss asked her to save one housemate from eviction on week 6 while she was leaving the house. Housemates were unable to cast their nominations against them. Shraddha nominated Akashdeep directly placing him against public vote. Remaining housemates nominated Pooja M., Mahek and Laxmi.
- ^7: Akashdeep was safe as captain and Mahek was immune from nominations because Laxmi took her name when Bigg Boss asked her to save one housemate from eviction on week 7 while she was leaving the house. Hence, they were immune from nomination. Akashdeep, taking assistance from Siddharth nominated Shraddha, Pooja M., Vida and Shonali directly placing them against public vote.
- ^8: Amar was safe as captain and nominated Pooja B, directly placing her against public vote. Akashdeep was nominated for eviction by the Bigg Boss as a result of losing the weekly task. Sunny was exempt from nomination. Remaining housemates nominated Mahek and Sidharth.
- ^9: Mahek was made the captain after Pooja M. (the reigning captain was ejected) and, hence, was safe for nominations. She nominated Akashdeep directly placing him against public vote. Akashdeep, Sidharth and Amar were called in the confession room to decide two names to directly place against the public vote. The trio came up with Shraddha and Sunny.
- ^10: Instead of nominating two housemates to place against the public vote, Bigg Boss asked the housemates to give two names whom they would save from eviction. Housemates saved Akashdeep and Sunny. Contrary to the result, the remaining housemates were put up for eviction.
- ^11: Before leaving the Family/Friends of the housemates, who came for a short visit to meet their loved ones, were asked to nominate two names for eviction excluding Pooja M., Sidharth and Andrew. Hence, Amar and Shonali got nominated.
- ^12: Captain's post was abolished by the Bigg Boss as punishment. Housemates nominated Amar, Sidharth, Juhi and Sunny. Voting lines were closed for the week, however, housemates were unaware of this. Mahek returned to the house via "Wildcard Voting Contest".
- ^13: Housemates weren't asked to give names to nominate for eviction. Bigg Boss nominated all housemates to give each an equal chance to secure their position in the final week.
- ^14: During the final week the public voted for who they wanted to win Bigg Boss, the housemates with the fewest votes were evicted on day 97 (the finale) with the winner revealed on the same night.

== Controversies ==
The participation of the pornographic actress Sunny Leone was criticised by the Indian Artistes and Actors Forum (IAAF), who sent a request to the Minister of Information and Broadcasting, Ambika Soni, to take action against Colors for indirectly encouraging and promoting pornography in India via the introduction of an adult entertainer.

The hosts Salman Khan and Sanjay Dutt were accused of intimidating behaviour towards some of the housemates, and some of the evicted housemates also accused Khan of favouring Mahek Chahal over other contestants. and Sanjay Dutt.
