= Akashdeep Saigal =

Indian television actor

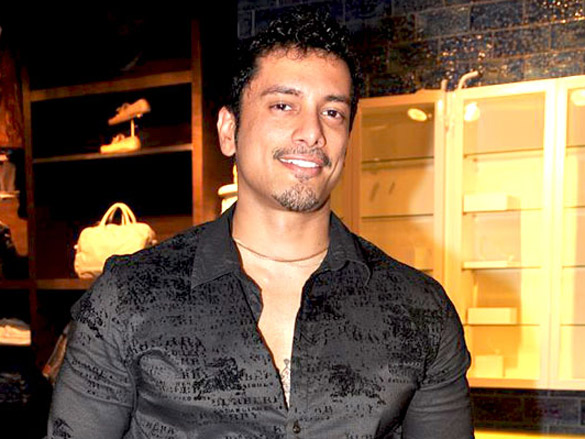
- Born: Mumbai, Maharashtra, India
- Other name: Skywalker
- Occupations: Model, actor
- Years active: 1997–present
- Known for: Kyunki Saas Bhi Kabhi Bahu Thi; Bigg Boss 5; Kyunki Saas Bhi Kabhi Bahu Thi 2; Naagin 7

Akashdeep Saigal is an Indian actor who works in Hindi television. He is best known for his portrayal of Ansh Gujral and Ekalavya Gujral in Star Plus's soap opera Kyunki Saas Bhi Kabhi Bahu Thi as well as participating in the reality show Bigg Boss 5 in which he became a finalist. He returned to television after nearly a decade in Naagin 7 and Kyunki Saas Bhi Kabhi Bahu Thi 2, both in 2026.

== Career ==
Akash won the Gladrags Manhunt Contestant, supermodel of the year in 1998. The same year he appeared on the 1998 music video for Shweta Shetty's Deewane to Deewane Hain. He started his acting career with the film Pyaar Mein Kabhi Kabhi (1999). He made his debut on small screen with the popular serial Kyunki Saas Bhi Kabhi Bahu Thi on Star Plus. He had participated in the first season of Jhalak Dikhhla Jaa 1, a dance competition on Sony Entertainment Television.

In 2009, he has played the role of the villain in Tamil language film Ayan. He also played the villain in the Tamil film Kavan in 2017.

In 2026, Saigal returned to television after a 8-year long hiatus to portray negative lead, Erul in the seventh season of Naagin.

At the same year, he was signed in the second season, sequel and reboot of Ekta Kapoor's iconic soap opera, Kyunki Saas Bhi Kabhi Bahu Thi 2. In April 2026, he returned to the Kyunki Saas... saga to play Riyansh Virani, the illegitimate son of Ansh Gujral from season 1. Netizens mocked Saigal's entry as Tulsi Virani's grandson, criticizing the unrealistic age dynamic as the actor appeared older than his on-screen grandmother and too mature for the role of a young man he was portraying on screen.

== Filmography ==
Year	Name	Role	Notes	Ref
1999	Pyaar Mein Kabhi Kabhi	Ronnie		
2003	Supari	Mushy		
2009	Ayan	Kamalesh	Tamil film	
2014	Sultanat	Tabraiz	Pakistani Film	
2017	Kavan	Kalyan	Tamil film	

=== Television ===
Year	Name	Role	Notes	Ref
2004–2005	Kyunki Saas Bhi Kabhi Bahu Thi	Ansh Virani		
2006–2008	Kyunki Saas Bhi Kabhi Bahu Thi	Ekalavya Virani		
2005	Kkusum	Trishul Kapoor		
2005	Time Bomb 9/11	Usman Bin Laden		
2006	Fear Factor India	Contestant	Finalist	
2006	Jhalak Dikhhla Jaa 1	Contestant	5th Place	
2007–2008	Kuchh Is Tara	Ranbir Nanda	Lead role	
2008	Kahaani Hamaaray Mahaabhaarat Ki	Kans	Supporting role	
2008	Kaho Na Yaar Hai	Contestant	Along with Sanaya Irani	
2008	Comedy Circus	Contestant	Along with Pervez Siddiqui	
2008	Kaun Jeetega Bollywood Ka Ticket	Contestant	Finalist	
2009	Iss Jungle Se Mujhe Bachao	Contestant	Evicted Day 52	
2011	Zor Ka Jhatka: Total Wipeout	Contestant	Finalist	
2011–2012	Bigg Boss 5	Contestant	Finalist	
2017	Sher-e-Punjab: Maharaja Ranjit Singh	Peer Muhammad		
2026	Naagin 7	Erul		
2026	Kyunki Saas Bhi Kabhi Bahu Thi 2	Riyansh "Rio" Virani	Recurring role	

== Awards and nominations ==
Year	Award	Show	Category	Result	Ref.
2004	Indian Telly Awards	Kyunki Saas Bhi Kabhi Bahu Thi	Best Actor in a Negative Role	Nominated	
2005	Indian Telly Awards	Kyunki Saas Bhi Kabhi Bahu Thi	Best Actor in a Negative Role	Won	
2007	Indian Telly Awards	Kyunki Saas Bhi Kabhi Bahu Thi	Best Actor in a Negative Role	Nominated	
