= Gulabo Sapera =

Indian dancer (born 1973)

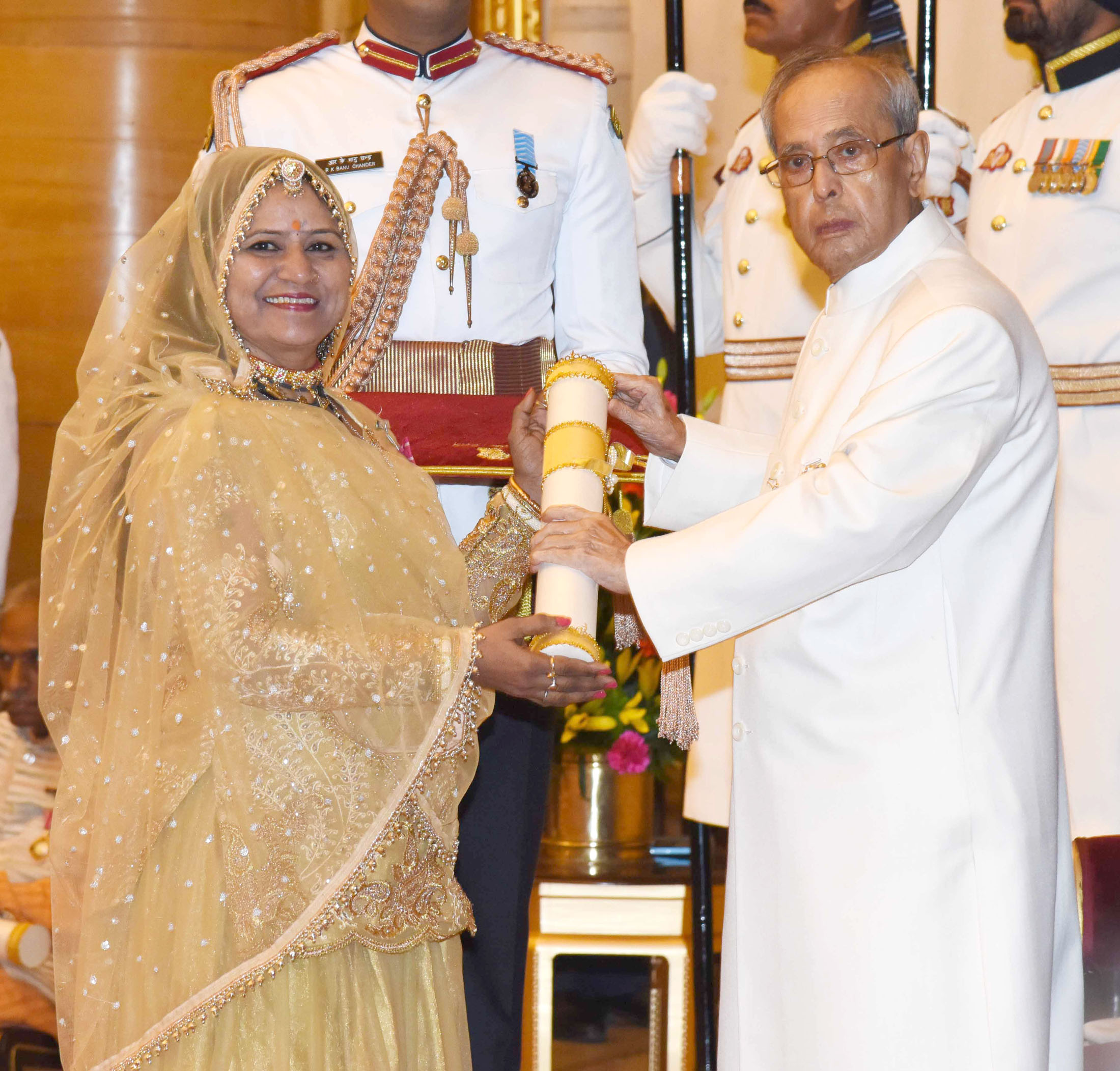
- Sapera in 2016
- Born: Rajasthan, India
- Occupation: Dancer
- Years active: 1980–present
- Spouse: Sohan Nath
- Children: Rakhi Poonam Sapera (daughter) Dino Banjara (son) Bhawani Sapera (son) Hema Sapera (daughter) Roopa Sapera (daughter)

Gulabo Sapera (a.k.a. Gulabo or Dhanvantri; born 1973) is an Indian dancer from Rajasthan, India.

== Personal life ==
Gulabo was born in 1973 in the nomadic Kalbaliya community. She was the seventh child of her parents. Gulabo Sapera became a celebrity dancer later in life.

In 2011, Gulabo featured in the reality television show Bigg Boss as contestant no. 12. On the show, she told the audience that she had been buried alive right after her birth, to be rescued by her mother and aunt.

== Awards ==
- The Government of India awarded her the Padma Shri in 2016.
- Bharat Gaurav Award 2021
- Genius Indian Achiever's Award 2025

== Television ==
Year	Shows	Role	Channel	Notes
2011	Bigg Boss 5	Celebrity Contestant	Colors TV	Evicted Week 2, Day 14
