= Shaheen (Indian TV series) =

Television series

- Genre: Drama
- Created by: Arvishi Cine Vision
- Written by: Pravesh Bhardwaj; Shruti Nagar
- Directed by: Pravesh Bhardwaj
- Starring: See below
- Theme music composer: Amitabh Varma
- Opening theme: Vishwajeet
- Country of origin: India
- Original language: Hindi
- No. of seasons: 1

Production
- Producer: Ajay Shah
- Camera setup: Mahendra Pradhan
- Running time: 20 Minutes
- Production company: Arvishi Cine Vision

Original release
- Network: Sony Entertainment Television
- Release: 2000

Shaheen (transl. Falcon) is an Indian television series which aired on Sony TV in 2000. It was produced by Arvishi Cine Vision's production house and stars Juhi Parmar in the lead role.

== Plot ==
Shaheen is a young Muslim girl who lives in Mumbai and dreams of doing something in life. Her father's only dream is to get her married into a rich royal family of Nawabs. Shaheen's dreams are shattered when she gets to know that her father has fixed her marriage with a Lucknow-based widower Nawab Junaid. There is a significant age difference between Shaheen and Junaid but she surrenders to her father's wishes and marries Junaid.

Shaheen shifts to Lucknow with Junaid and gradually starts adjusting to a very different city and culture. However, she is soon shocked to discover that Junaid has a son from his previous marriage, a fact her father hid from her. Junaid then tells her that he can never give her the place of his first wife. Shaheen decides to carry on and joins a college with Junaid's support. There she meets a young poet named Rafee and falls in love with him.

The story then revolves around Shaheen's relationship with Junaid and how she must decide to choose between him and Rafee.

== Cast ==
- Juhi Parmar as Shaheen
- Bhaveen Gossain as Nawab Junaid
- Sushma Seth as Begum Sahiba
- Amit Behl as Hussain
- Tara Mehta as Najma
- Naved Aslam as Damodar
- Abha Dhulia as Supriya
- Vandana Sajnani as Anupama
- Manasi Upadhyay as Narayani
- Ravikiran Shastry as Wasim
- Neena Cheema as Sushma
- Abhay Puniani as Anand
- Rutuja Shah as Rampal
- Mahesh Kanwal as Anand Rai
- Lopa Bhatt as Karan
- Manav Kaushik as Ravi
