= Shonali Nagrani =

Indian actress, tv host, beauty pageant titleholder

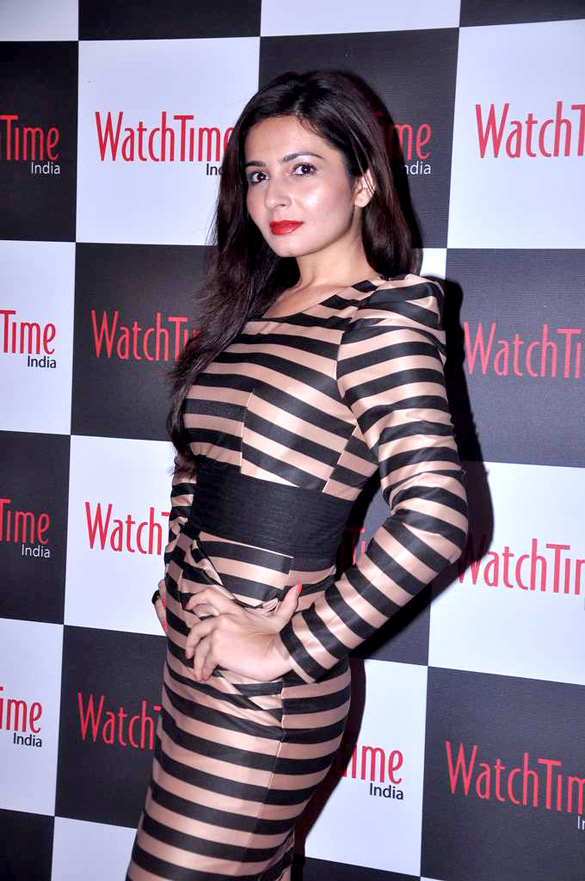
- Shonali Nagrani at the launch of Watch Time's magazine, July 2012.
- Born: New Delhi, India
- Occupations: Actress; tv host; beauty pageant titleholder
- Height: 1.73 m (5 ft 8 in)
- Beauty pageant titleholder
- Title: Femina Miss India International 2003
- Years active: 2003–present
- Major competitions: Femina Miss India 2003 (Top 5) (Femina Miss India International 2003); Miss International 2003 (1st Runner-up)

Shonali Nagrani is an Indian actress, TV host and beauty pageant titleholder. She hosted Indian Premier League. She has also appeared in Hindi language films. She entered the Femina Miss India pageant in 2003 and was crowned Femina Miss India International, allowing her to compete in Miss International 2003, where she was crowned the 1st runner-up. Alongside appearances as a model, Nagrani has hosted IPL for four consecutive years. She was voted as one of India's "50 Most Desirable Women" for the year 2011 and 2012 by the Times of India.

== Early life ==
Nagrani hails from a Sindhi family in Delhi. She studied at Good Shepherd English School in Bengdubi, Bagdogra and Army Public School in Dhaula Kuan, New Delhi. She graduated from the Lady Shri Ram College in New Delhi in 2003. Nagrani's family also consists of a military background, as her father is a retired Indian Naval officer. In 2013, she married her boyfriend Shiraz Bhattacharya in Kerala.

== Career ==
=== Modelling ===
She was crowned Femina Miss India International 2003 and as a result, she was selected as India's representative in Miss International for 2003. She was consequently entered and finished as 1st runner up at Miss International 2003 that was hosted in Tokyo, Japan. She also subsequently was given the chance to meet the Prince of Wales at a reception on his official tour of India in 2003. Since then, she has been an active model, appearing in shows for numerous modelling companies. She was voted as one of the top "50 Most Desirable Women" in 2011 and 2012 by the Times of India.

=== Television ===
Nagrani has enjoyed success as a television presenter, featuring on Indian and British television. In her early career, she hosted Popcorn on Zoom TV. She also appeared as a guest TV presenter for the Christmas special episode of Indian Idol. In 2007, she made her entry into the GEC's with the Great Indian Laughter Challenge on STAR One. She hosted the IIFA Awards in Dubai for Star Plus in 2007, which was followed by the GIIMA in Malaysia for Sony TV. Furthermore, she went on to feature as the host of Mr. and Ms. TV on Sony, and also worked as the presenter of the show for Salaam-e-Ishq (a couple based reality show) on Star One. Her other work includes hosting Filmy Cocktail and Dumdar Hits. She was also on Colors competing in Khatron Ke Khiladi in 2009. In 2011, Nagrani was a celebrity contestant in the fifth season of the Indian version of the reality TV show Big Brother, Bigg Boss.

=== Cricket ===
Nagrani has been an active host for cricket shows since 2006, and began by hosting the Champions Trophy in the same year. She subsequently hosted the 2007 Cricket World Cup for Indian viewers. In 2008, she hosted a show titled Extraaa Innings T20, a show showcasing and highlighting cricketing action. In 2009, she worked for bigger brands in ESPN and Star Cricket, and began by hosting a cricket based show called Stumped, which again showed highlights of 2009 ICC World Twenty20 alongside Wasim Akram. In 2010, she hosted another T20 World Cup analysing program with co-presenters Cyrus Broacha and Wasim Akram, which aired on ESPN-Star Sports. After successful work for ESPN and other networks, she was signed by ITV in 2011 to co-host their coverage of the IPL, alongside Matt Smith, where she acts as an analyst and presenter alongside studio guests. Since then, she has made her foray into UK television, and has hosted the IPL for four consecutive seasons.

=== Film ===
Nagrani has also appeared in Hindi language films in predominantly supporting roles. She was initially supposed to make her debut with the 2005 film Zeher with Emraan Hashmi, although she was forced to pull out after the film faced pre-production delays, but she has not featured in a major film role since. However, she has featured in two cameo roles in Dil Bole Hadippa! and Rab Ne Bana Di Jodi.

== Filmography ==
=== Films ===
List of film credits
Year	Title	Role	Language
2008	Rab Ne Bana Di Jodi	Special appearance	Hindi
2009	Dil Bole Hadippa!	Special appearance	Hindi

=== Television ===
List of television credits
Year	Title	Role
2009	Fear Factor: Khatron Ke Khiladi 2	Contestant (6th place)
2011	Bigg Boss 5	Contestant (7th place)

=== Web series ===
List of web series credits
Year	Title	Role	Channel
2021	Tandav	Aditi Mishra	Amazon Prime Video
2021	Sunflower	Mrs. Naina Kapoor	ZEE5

Preceded by (India) Gauahar Khan	Femina Miss India International; 2003	Succeeded by (India) Mihika Verma
