= Vida Samadzai =

Miss Afghanistan (2003; born 1978)

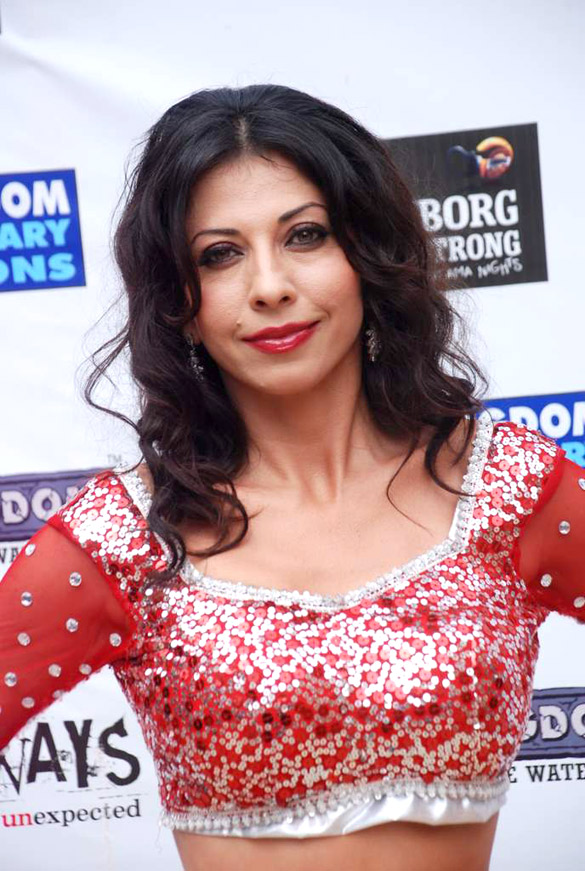
- Vida Samadzai performing at a Water Kingdom event in May 2012
- Born: 22 February 1978 (age 48); Kabul, Republic of Afghanistan
- Citizenship: United States
- Education: California State University

Vida Samadzai (born 22 February 1978) is an Afghan-American actress, model and beauty pageant titleholder who was Miss Afghanistan 2003. As the first Afghan woman to participate in an international beauty pageant since 1974, her appearance in a red bikini in the 2003 edition of Miss Earth pageant created controversy in her native country. She was a contestant on the popular reality show Bigg Boss in 2011.

== Biography ==
Samadzai was born and raised in Kabul, Afghanistan, and moved to the United States in 1996. She graduated from California State University at Fullerton and became a citizen of the U.S. Samadzai also helped found a US-based women's charity that seeks to raise awareness of women's rights and education in the Afghanistan.

After placing as the third runner up in Susan Jeske's first Ms. America International pageant in 2002, she applicated for consideration in the new Miss Earth pageant in 2003 and was selected as Afghanistan's representative from abroad, as there were no beauty queen contests in Afghanistan. Although she did not hold the title of a "Miss Afghanistan", this made her the first Afghan woman to take part in an international beauty contest since Zohra Daoud had been crowned Miss Afghanistan in 1974. Her participation in the Miss Earth beauty pageant was condemned by the Afghan Supreme Court, saying such a display of the female body goes against Islamic law and Afghan culture. In particular, traditionalists objected to her appearance in a red bikini during the pageant's press presentation. She was given a special "Beauty for a Cause" award at that year's Miss Earth competition.

The following year, Samadzai returned to the pageant and was among the 11 jurors who helped choose Priscilla Meirelles as Miss Earth 2004. On coronation night, the young women's rights activist wore a gown, saying: "I don't know if they'll have a problem this time because I'm not showing any skin or wearing a swimsuit". On 1 May 2005, Vida Samadzai won Susan Jeske's little known Ms. America 2005-06 pageant.

== Television ==
Year	Name	Role	Channel	Notes	Ref
2011	Bigg Boss 5	Contestant	Colors TV	Entered Day 1, Evicted Day 49	
