= Sonika Kaliraman =

Indian wrestler (born 1983)

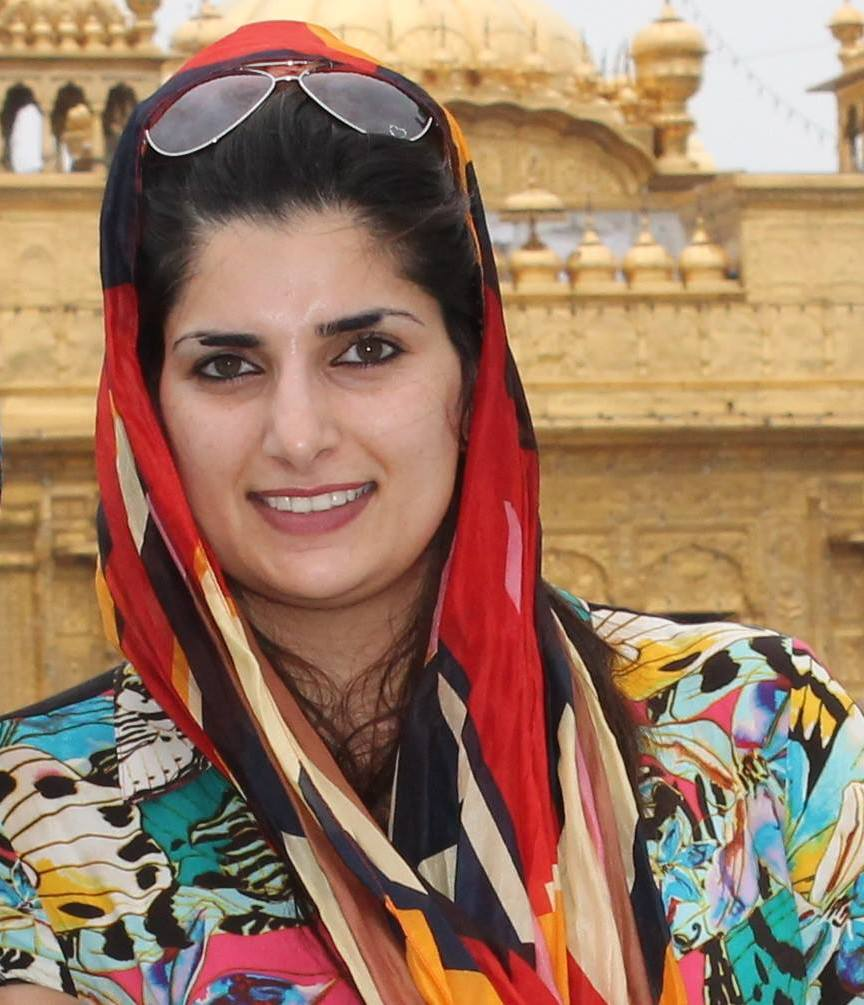
- Sonika Kaliraman at Golden Temple
- Born: 11 June 1983 (age 43); Delhi, India
- Occupation: Sportswoman (Wrestler)
- Known for: Wrestling
- Notable work: First Indian Woman Wrestler Bharat Kesari
- Title: First Indian Woman Wrestler
- Parent: Chandgi Ram (father)
- Website: sonikakaliraman.com

Sonika Kaliraman is an Indian woman professional wrestler to win the title of Bharat Kesri in Bharat Kesri Dangal in 2001. She was a contestant on the popular reality show Bigg Boss in 2011.

== Personal life ==
Sonika Kaliraman is the daughter of former wrestler Chandgi Ram (Master Chadgiram). She was trained by her father who always dreamt of his four daughters becoming wrestlers. He even had to fight against social norms and with the Indian Wrestling Foundation for many years. She won gold at the Asian Women Wrestling Championship in 2000.

Her brother Jagdish Kaliraman is also a wrestler. She married US-based businessman, Siddharth Malik.They have Three Kids, Soharth Malik, Sidhesh Malik and Shivay Malik.

Sonika Kaliraman alleged that in 1998–99, while travelng to Poland as part of a junior sub-team, she was sexually harassed by the coach there. She reported the incident to her father as well as to WFI president G.S. Mander. However, G.S. Mander refuted her claims and stated that he would file a defamation suit against her.

== Career ==
Kaliraman is one of 200 Indian women who wrestle professionally. She is also one of the 50 Indian women who represented India internationally. She won a gold medal at the Asian Women Wrestling Championship in 2000.

In August 2009, she participated in Fear Factor: Khatron Ke Khiladi (season 2) and participated in Bigg Boss 5.

She demanded Open Trials for selection into the National Squad after she was dropped.

== Television ==
Year	Shows	Role	Channel
2009	Fear Factor: Khatron Ke Khiladi 2	Contestant	Colors TV
2011	Bigg Boss 5	Contestant	Colors TV

== See also ==
- Wrestling at the 2006 Asian Games
- Zor Ka Jhatka: Total Wipeout
