= Juhi Parmar =

Indian actress (born 1980)

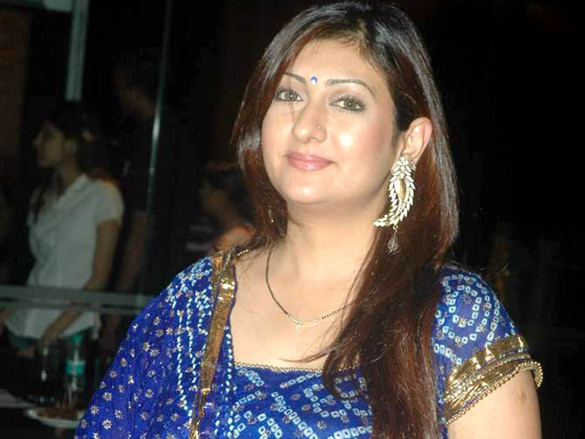
- Juhi Parmar in 2012
- Born: 14 December 1980 (age 45); Ujjain, Madhya Pradesh, India
- Occupation: Actress
- Known for: Kumkum – Ek Pyara Sa Bandhan; Bigg Boss 5
- Spouse: Sachin Shroff (m. 2009; div. 2018)
- Children: 1

Juhi Parmar (born 14 December 1980) is an Indian anchor, actress, presenter, singer and dancer predominantly known for her work in Hindi television industry. She gained recognition for her portrayal as Kumkum in the long-running soap opera Kumkum – Ek Pyara Sa Bandhan (2002–2009) and that of Devi Sandhya and Devi Chhaya in Karmaphal Daata Shani. She then won the reality show Bigg Boss 5 (2011–12).

== Career ==
Parmar debuted into Hindi television as Samidha in Zee TV's 1998 series Woh.

After a short break, she began the next century of 2000s with Sony Entertainment Television's Choodiyan. It featured her as Meghna, a caring and lovely sister who lost her mother in a horrific accident. Her first titular protagonistic role was in Shaheen. The same year she appeared in Yeh Jeevan Hai and first season of Rishtey. In 2001, she was cast in the second season of Rishtey and ventured into Gujarati cinema with Rangai Jaane Rangma followed by her Hindi foraying with Madhur Milan.

The most beneficial break and major popularity for Parmar came in 2002, when she took on the titular lead part of Kumkum opposite Hussain Kuwajerwala in Kumkum – Ek Pyara Sa Bandhan, a long-running soap opera that aired on Star Plus. Her performance as Kumkum made her a household name and was awarded with Best Actress (Critics) at Indian Telly Awards. One of the most longest-running Indian television series, it wrapped up in 2009 after a successful run of continuously seven years.

Simultaneously alongside Kumkum – Ek Pyara Sa Bandhan , Parmar also did appearances in several other commitments.

In 2003, Parmar won The Miss Rajasthan beauty pageant. She started her career with television serial Woh on Zee TV. Her biggest break came when she became a household name for her portrayal as Kumkum in Star Plus's Indian soap opera Kumkum – Ek Pyara Sa Bandhan opposite Hussain Kuwajerwala for which she also won the Best Actress (Critics) at the Indian Telly Awards in 2005. Juhi participated and became a finalist in the reality shows Say Shava Shava and Saas v/s Bahu. She also became the winner of Comedy Circus.

In October 2011, Juhi was a contestant in the fifth season of the Indian version of the reality TV show Big Brother, Bigg Boss. She survived for full 14 weeks and became the winner of the show In January 2012.

She was also seen in a cameo role in And TV's popular mythological drama series Santoshi Maa along with her then husband Sachin Shroff and was seen in another successful mythological show Karmaphal Daata Shani from 2016 to 2018.

She appeared in the supernatural genre in the Colors TV show Tantra in 2018. In 2020, during COVID-19, she played the lead protagonist role in the Zee TV show Hamari Wali Good News, which ran for almost a year.

Since September 2025, she hosted Zee TV's Kaahani Har Ghar Ki.

== Personal life ==
Parmar is originally from a Rajasthani background. She married Sindhi businessman and actor Sachin Shroff on 15 February 2009 at a palace in Jaipur. The couple have a daughter, Samairra Parmar, born on 27 January 2013.

In early January 2018, Parmar confirmed that they had recently filed for divorce. After several months of arguing, the couple were granted a divorce in July 2018. Parmar was granted custody of their daughter.

== Filmography ==
=== Television ===
Year	Show	Role	Notes	Ref(s)
1998	Jee Sahab			
1998	Woh	Samidha		
2000	Choodiyan	Meghna		
2000	Shaheen	Shaheen		
2000	Yeh Jeevan Hai	Saloni		
2000	Rishtey	Swasti		
2001	Rishtey	Suman		
2002–2009	Kumkum – Ek Pyara Sa Bandhan	Kumkum Rai / Kumkum Jatin Wadhwa / Kumkum Sumeet Wadhwa	Also played the role of "Chanda" in 2003–2004 and "Kumkum Mishra" in 2008–2009	
2002	Virasaat	Guest		
2002	Sanjivani	Kumkum	Guest	
2002	Chhoo Lo Aasma			
2002	Kisme Kitna Hai Dum	Contestant		
2003	Kkusum	Herself	Special appearance	
2004	Devi	Kalika Shastri / Kalika Raj Malhotra		
2004	Kasautii Zindagii Kay	Kumkum	Guest	
2005	Kyunki Saas Bhi Kabhi Bahu Thi	Kumkum		Guest
2006	Tere Ishq Mein	Hiba		
2007	Star Voice of India	Host		
2007	Antakshari - The Great Challenge	Host		
2007	Rookhey Naina			
2007	Nach Baliye 3	Guest host		
2008	Saas v/s Bahu	Contestant	Finalist	
2008	Say Shava Shava	Contestant	Finalist	
2008	Kaho Na Yaar Hai	Contestant	Episode #11	
2008	Comedy Circus Kaante Ki Takkar	Contestant		
2008	Aajaa Mahi Vay	Contestant		
2008	Jo Jeeta Wohi Super Star	Kumkum	Guest	
2008	Comedy Circus 2	Contestant	Winner	
2008	Chhote Miyan	Host		
2009–2010	Yeh Chanda Kanoon Hai	Chanda Rani		
2009	Chhote Miyan Bade Miyan	Host		
2009	Allah Tero Naam Ishwar Tero Naam	Host		
2009	Rakhi Ka Swayamwar	Host		
2009	Pati Patni Aur Woh	Contestant		
2009	Star Vivaah	Guest		
2010	Tere Liye	Guest		
2011	Maa Exchange	Contestant		
2011–2012	Bigg Boss 5	Contestant	Winner	
2012	F.I.R.	Meera Malhotra	Guest	
2015	Santoshi Maa	Riddhima	Special appearance	
2016–2018	Karmaphal Daata Shani	Devi Sandhya/Devi Chhaya		
2018–2019	Tantra	Sumati Prithvi Khanna		
2020–2021	Hamari Wali Good News	Renuka Mukund Tiwari/Meera Parmar / Meera Mukund Tiwari		
2025	Kahaani Har Ghar Ki	Host		

=== Web Series ===
Year	Show	Name	Role	Language	Notes
2018	Yeh Meri Family	Neerja	Mother/School Teacher	Hindi	Season 2 Onwards

=== Film ===
Year	Show	Role	Language	Notes
2001	Rangai Jaane Rangma		Gujarati	
2002	Madhur Milan		Hindi	Telefilm for ETV Hindi
2005	Pehchaan: The Face of Truth	Swati Lal	Hindi/English	
2011	Padduram	Gitanjali Mehra	Hindi	
2012	Ek Tha Tiger	News Reporter	Hindi	
