= Bigg Boss OTT (Hindi) =

Indian Hindi-language digital reality series

- Title card for the 3rd season with host Anil Kapoor
- Based on: Big Brother
- Presented by: Karan Johar (Season 1); Salman Khan (Season 2); Anil Kapoor (Season 3)
- Voices of: Atul Kapoor
- Narrated by: Vijay Vikram Singh
- Country of origin: India
- Original language: Hindi
- No. of seasons: 3
- No. of episodes: 144

Production
- Production location: Film City, Mumbai
- Camera setup: Multi-camera
- Running time: 24 hours (Live); 70–85 minutes episode
- Production company: Endemol Shine India

Original release
- Network: Voot
- Release: 8 August – 18 September 2021
- Network: JioStar
- Release: 17 June 2023 – 2 August 2024

Related
- Bigg Boss

Bigg Boss: OTT (or Bigg Boss: Over-the-Top) is a digital spin-off of the popular Indian Hindi-language reality show Bigg Boss franchise, streamed first on Voot for its initial season and later on JioCinema for the second season and JioCinema Premium for the third. Following the format of the Dutch reality game show Big Brother, developed by Endemol, Bigg Boss OTT has launched three seasons. The first season premiered on August 8, 2021, and was hosted by Karan Johar. The second season saw Salman Khan take over as the host, while Anil Kapoor hosted the recently concluded third season. A total of 45 contestants have participated in Bigg Boss OTT, with 5 of them having also appeared in the main Bigg Boss seasons.

On 20 January 2026, It was officially confirmed that the Bigg Boss OTT series has been cancelled prior the failure of third season and there will be no OTT edition from now on while the entire show will merged with the TV version of the show.

== Concept ==
As with the television series, the group of contestants referred to as Housemates are enclosed in the Bigg Boss House under constant surveillance of cameras and microphones. The winner of Bigg Boss OTT receives ₹25 lakh and the "OTT edition" trophy.

The show is a 24/7 non-stop show and also it has 1-hour daily episode on Voot (Season 1) and JioCinema (Season 2 onwards) like the original edition.

== Development ==
The spin-off edition's first season was announced on 24 July 2021, Voot unveiled a poster with Karan Johar as the host of this digital exclusive season. On 3 August, Voot unveiled a third promo with Johar revealing the format of the season.

JioCinema released a promo announcing the second season on 26 May 2023 featuring host Salman Khan. On 13 June, four days before the premiere episode, first look of twelve housemates were revealed.

JioCinema released a promo announcing the third season on 22 May 2024 while on 31 May 2024, promo featuring new host Anil Kapoor was released.

=== Broadcasts ===
There is no television coverage for this edition; instead, it is completely streamed online at Voot for the first season and JioCinema for the second season onwards for 24×7 coverage.

=== House ===
The location for the house set to remain at Film City, Mumbai like how it did for the original series. The house contains a living area, one large bedroom, kitchen, garden, bathroom, lounge room, store room, smoking room, activity area, store room, swimming pool and medical room. Jail was there in house for first two seasons. The house also contains a confession room where contestants speak private matters to Bigg Boss.

== Series overview ==
Series	Host	House location	Episodes	Originally released			Days	Housemates	Prize money	Winner	Runner-up
Series	Host	House location	Episodes	First released	Last released	Network	Days	Housemates	Prize money	Winner	Runner-up
1	Karan Johar	Film City, Mumbai	42	8 August 2021	18 September 2021	Voot	42	13	₹25 lakh (US$26,000)	Divya Agarwal	Nishant Bhat
2	Salman Khan	Film City, Mumbai	59	17 June 2023	14 August 2023	JioCinema	59	15	₹25 lakh (US$26,000)	Elvish Yadav	Abhishek Malhan
3	Anil Kapoor	Film City, Mumbai	43	21 June 2024	2 August 2024	JioCinema	43	17	₹25 lakh (US$26,000)	Sana Makbul	Naved Shaikh

== Housemate pattern ==
Clique	S1	S2	S3
Astrologer	—N/a	Bebika Dhurve	Munisha Khatwani
Dancer	Nishant Bhat	—N/a	—N/a
LGBT	Muskan Jattana	—N/a	—N/a
Film Star	Akshara Singh	Aaliya Siddiqui	Ranvir Shorey
Film Star	Karan Nath	Aashika Bhatia	—N/a
Film Star	Raqesh Bapat	Akanksha Puri	—N/a
Film Star	Shamita Shetty	Pooja Bhatt	—N/a
International Star	—N/a	Jad Hadid	—N/a
Seasoned Model	—N/a	—N/a	Sana Sultaan Khan
Reality Show Alumni	Divya Agarwal	Manisha Rani	—N/a
Reality Show Alumni	Nishant Bhat	—N/a	—N/a
Reality Show Alumni	Pratik Sehajpal	—N/a	—N/a
Singer/Rapper	Milind Gaba	—N/a	Naezy Sheikh
Singer/Rapper	Neha Bhasin	—N/a	—N/a
Television Star	Urfi Javed	Avinash Sachdev	Sai Ketan Rao
Television Star	Zeeshan Khan	Cyrus Broacha	Sana Makbul
Television Star	Ridhima Pandit	Falaq Naaz	Poulomi Das
Television Star	—N/a	Jiya Shankar	—N/a
Television Star	—N/a	Palak Purswani	—N/a
Social Media Influencers	—N/a	Puneet Kumar	Adnaan Shaikh
Social Media Influencers	—N/a	—N/a	Vishal Pandey
Social Media Influencers	—N/a	—N/a	Chandrika Dixit Gera
Sportsperson	—N/a	—N/a	Neeraj Goyat
TV Presenter	—N/a	—N/a	Deepak Chaurasia
Youtube Sensation	—N/a	Abhishek Malhan	Armaan Malik
Youtube Sensation	—N/a	Elvish Yadav	Kritika Malik
Youtube Sensation	—N/a	—N/a	Lovekesh Kataria
Youtube Sensation	—N/a	—N/a	Payal Malik
Youtube Sensation	—N/a	—N/a	Shivani Kumari
Runner-up Winner Finalist
Winner	Divya Agarwal	Elvish Yadav	Sana Makbul
Runner-up	Nishant Bhat	Abhishek Malhan	Naezy
