= Bigg Boss OTT (Hindi season 3) =

Season of television series (2024)

- Season 3
- Eye Logo of Bigg Boss OTT 3
- Presented by: Anil Kapoor
- No. of days: 42
- No. of housemates: 17
- Winner: Sana Makbul
- Runner-up: Naezy
- No. of episodes: 43

Release
- Original network: JioCinema Premium
- Original release: 21 June – 2 August 2024

Season chronology
- ← Previous; Season 2 Next → Ended

Bigg Boss OTT 3 also known as Bigg Boss: Over-the-Top Season 3, is the third and final season of the Indian reality digital series Bigg Boss OTT, the spin-off version of Bigg Boss. It premiered on 21 June 2024 on JioCinema Premium. Anil Kapoor hosted the show for first time by replacing Salman Khan. The Grand Finale of the show took place on 2 August 2024 where Sana Makbul emerged as the winner and Naezy Sheikh as the runner-up.

== Production ==
=== Teaser ===
On May 22, 2024, JioCinema released a teaser on social media. On May 31, 2024, JioCinema released a new teaser presenting Anil Kapoor as the host of season.

=== Poster ===
The poster of show start date was released on June 6, 2024 with host Anil Kapoor featuring in it.

=== Broadcast ===
In a change from the previous season, viewers will have access to 24x7 camera footage only if they have a subscription to JioCinema Premium. An hour-long episode will also be broadcast daily which would be available for non premium viewers.

=== House ===
The house design for this season is designed by Omung Kumar, featuring a fantasy theme. A glimpse of the house was revealed by JioCinema on June 20, 2024, a day before the Grand Premiere.

=== Eye logo ===
The Eye logo for this season features a mix of light and dark colors filling the pupil and lens, including golden, light yellow, and dark yellow, with a bright orange core representing the pupil. Indian culture symbols are embedded around the pupil, and the entire logo has been symbolically lit up with fire, creating a visual resemblance to the sun.

=== Trophy ===
Trophy of BB OTT

The trophy was revealed on 31st July which had a miniature of a person sitting on throne royally with its face covered or masked.

== Housemates status ==
Sr	Housemate	Day Entered	Day Exited	Status
1	Sana M	Day 1	Day 42	Winner
2	Naezy	Day 1	Day 42	1st Runner-Up
3	Ranveer	Day 1	Day 42	2nd Runner-up
4	Sai	Day 1	Day 42	3rd Runner-up
5	Kritika	Day 1	Day 42	4th Runner-up
6	Armaan	Day 1	Day 39	Evicted
7	Lovekesh	Day 1	Day 39	Evicted by Housemates
8	Vishal	Day 1	Day 36	Evicted
9	Shivani	Day 1	Day 36	Evicted by Housemates
10	Sana S	Day 1	Day 31	Evicted
11	Adnan	Day 26	Day 31	Evicted
12	Deepak	Day 1	Day 28	Evicted
13	Chandrika	Day 1	Day 23	Evicted
14	Munisha	Day 1	Day 16	Evicted by Housemates
15	Poulomi	Day 1	Day 12	Evicted by Lovekesh
16	Payal	Day 1	Day 9	Evicted
17	Neeraj	Day 1	Day 5	Evicted

== Housemates ==
The list of contestants in the order of entering the house:

16 Original entrants of season with host and eye logo

=== Original entrants ===
- Chandrika Dixit Gera – Vada pav street vendor & content creator.
- Ranvir Shorey – Actor and former VJ. He is known for acting in films like Pyaar Ke Side Effects, Aaja Nachle and Ugly Aur Pagli.
- Shivani Kumari – Influencer and village-lifestyle content creator.
- Sana Makbul – Model and actress who mainly works in Hindi television. She is best known for portraying Lavanya Kashyap in Iss Pyaar Ko Kya Naam Doon, Dr. Aliya in Vish and participating in Fear Factor: Khatron Ke Khiladi 11.
- Vishal Pandey – Social media influencer, model and content creator.
- Lovekesh Kataria – Content creator.
- Deepak Chaurasia – Journalist and Hindi-language news anchor.
- Sai Ketan Rao – Actor. He is known for acting in Mehndi Hai Rachne Waali and Imlie
- Munisha Khatwani – Celebrity tarot card reader.
- Sana Sultaan Khan – Model and social media personality. She has appeared in several music videos.
- Armaan Malik – Content creator. He made headlines due to polygamy and announcing the pregnancy of both his wives at the same time.
- Payal Malik – Content creator. She is Armaan Malik's first wife.
- Kritika Malik – Content creator. She is Armaan Malik's second wife.
- Neeraj Goyat – Professional boxer and proficient in mixed martial arts. He won the title of "India's Most Promising Boxer" in 2008.
- Naved Shaikh – Rapper. The musical-drama film Gully Boy is partially inspired from his life.
- Poulomi Das – Model and television actress. She is best known for portraying Baby in Suhani Si Ek Ladki, Purnima in Kartik Purnima and Swarna in Naagin 6.

=== Wild-card entrants ===
- Adnaan Shaikh – Influencer and content creator.

== Twists ==
=== Phones ===
For the first time in the seventeen-year history of Bigg Boss, housemates are allowed to use phones during this season. Bigg Boss provided each housemate with a smartphone where they can receive messages from Bigg Boss and communicate with other housemates when permitted. However, only the "Baaharwala" has access to feedback from the outside world.

=== Baaharwala ===
On the premiere day, Anil Kapoor introduced the "Baaharwala" twist, where one housemate would be designated as the "Baaharwala". This person would receive information and feedback from the outside world until being fired by Bigg Boss. The "Baaharwala” would possess special powers and be immune from evictions, even if they were nominated.

Week No.	Week 1		Week 2	Week 3	Week 4	Week 5	Week 6
Baaharwala/ Baaharwala Gang	Sana S	Sai	Lovekesh		Adnaan, Ranvir and Vishal	Ranvir and Sana M	Baaharwala theme ended

== Weekly summary ==
Week 1	Entrances	On the Grand Premiere, Chandrika, Ranvir, Shivani, Sana M, Vishal, Lovekesh, Deepak, Sai, Munisha, Sana S, Armaan, Payal, Kritika, Neeraj, Naezy and Poulomi entered the house as the original housemates.
Week 1	Twists	On the Grand Premiere, host Anil Kapoor announced that Sana S would be the inaugural "Baaharwala" granting her access to outside information from the audience and immunity from nominations along with special powers in nominations.
Week 1	Twists	On Day 6, Sana S was fired as Baaharwala and Sai was chosen as the next Baaharwala.
Week 1	Head of House Task	None
Week 1	Head of House	None
Week 1	Baaharwala	~~Sana Sultan Khan~~; Sai Ketan Rao
Week 1	Nominations	Photo Lab On Day 3, each housemate was required to nominate two other housemates for eviction by tearing their respective black and white photos in the Photo Lab, which was set up in the Activity Area.
Week 1	Nominations	After the housemates cast their votes, the nominated housemates were Deepak, Ranvir, Sai, and Sana S. However, Bigg Boss introduced a twist by only accepting the nominees chosen by the "Baaharwala"—Neeraj and Shivani—ultimately placing them in the final nomination list.
Week 1	Nominations	Neeraj and Shivani were nominated for first-week, mid-week eviction.
Week 1	Nominations	Nominations Ki Aawaaz On Day 6, each housemate was required to nominate two other housemates for eviction by saying names to tree near store room by crossing pool after which name would be echoed in house.
Week 1	Nominations	Bigg Boss granted Bahaarwala contestant Sana Sultaan the power to revoke the nomination rights of three contestants prior to the nomination process. Sana chose to remove the nomination rights of Armaan, Payal, and Chandrika, preventing them from participating in that week's nomination process.
Week 1	Nominations	Armaan, Deepak, Lovekesh, Sai, Sana S and Shivani were nominated for first-week, weekend eviction.
Week 1	Tasks	Aaj Ka Mudda with Deepak Chaurasia On Day 2, a debate took place among six housemates. The topic of discussion was centered around the contributions and participation of Armaan, Lovekesh, and Neeraj in the show. Ranvir, Sai, and Sana S were assigned the role of questioning the involvement of these three housemates in the house's matters, essentially acting as the "prosecuting" side in this debate format. The defendants, Armaan, Lovekesh, and Neeraj, answered questions and countered the arguments brought forth by the "prosecuting" side. The remaining housemates formed the audience and were permitted to question each speaker as well. Deepak moderated the debate.
Week 1	Tasks	Winners - Armaan, Lovekesh and Neeraj
Week 1	Tasks	Failed - Ranvir, Sai and Sana S
Week 1	Tasks	Ration task - rankings On Day 4, Bigg Boss assigned a task to the housemates to earn ration for the house by determining rankings from 1 to 16 based on each contestant's contribution to the show. However, as the housemates were unable to provide logical reasons for each ranking and appeared to be in a hurry, Bigg Boss decided to cancel the task midway. Additionally, Bigg Boss pointed out that the rankings suggested by the housemates did not align with the rankings determined by the live audience.
Week 1	Tasks	Task Cancelled
Week 1	Tasks	BB Pet Care On Day 5, a task was announced for assigning house duties, turning housemates into caretakers of pets. Housemates would earn points during the task, which could be used to purchase favorable house duties. In each round, three housemates would assume the role of caretakers, and a manager would assess their performance, awarding points that could be exchanged for house duty assignments. At the conclusion of the task, the names displayed on the board next to each duty would be considered final for the week.: Round / Caretakers / Manager; 1 / Lovekesh; Sana M Poulomi / Ranvir; 2 / Kritika; Shivani; Chandrika / Armaan; 3 / Deepak; Sai; Naezy / Lovekesh; 4 / Ranvir; Munisha; Sana S / Vishal; 5 / Payal; Vishal; Armaan / Sai
Week 1	Tasks	BB Duty Board: Duties / / Housemate(s); Cooking 75,000 / Breakfast / Poulomi; Lovekesh; Sana M Sai; Cooking 75,000 / Lunch / Naezy; Vishal; Cooking 75,000 / Dinner / Chandrika; Naezy; Vishal; Cleaning 50,000 / Bathroom / Ranvir; Armaan; Cleaning 50,000 / Bedroom / Sai; Munisha; Cleaning 50,000 / Kitchen / Sai; Ranvir; Payal; Cleaning 50,000 / Garden / Lovekesh; Sana S; Utensils 25,000 / Breakfast / Poulomi; Lovekesh; Utensils 25,000 / Lunch / Sana M Deepak; Vishal; Utensils 25,000 / Dinner / Kritika; Munisha; Sana S; Chopping 15,000 / Breakfast / Sana M Ranvir; Vishal; Chopping 15,000 / Lunch / Sana M Deepak; Vishal; Chopping 15,000 / Dinner / Shivani; Kritika; Armaan
Week 1	Tasks	Magical well On Day 7, a magical well was placed in the activity area, offering housemates the opportunity to make a wish that could potentially be granted. To be eligible, the wishes had to be feasible within the confines of the house. Whenever a frog situated in the well made a sound, the activity area would be accessible, allowing one housemate to enter at a time. In order to make a wish, the housemates needed to sacrifice a personal item belonging to another contestant in the well. The number of wishes each housemate could make was directly proportional to the number of personal items they were willing to sacrifice.
Week 1	Tasks	Wishes were only made by Armaan, Lovekesh, Ranvir, Shivani and Vishal.
Week 1	Tasks	Curse Ka Kasht On Day 9, all housemates were individually called to the confession room, where they were asked to declare to whom they wanted to give a curse that would cause them pain.
Week 1	Tasks	Curse of Ranvir was granted which was to take away all hair grooming products of Vishal until Bigg Boss gives again.
Week 1	Punishments	On Days 1 and 2, the housemates consumed all the ration provided by Bigg Boss that was intended to last for a week. In response to this miscalculation, Bigg Boss provided additional fruits on Day 3 to ensure sufficient supplies for the remainder of the week.; On Day 4, as a result of the housemates' unsuccessful attempt at the rankings task, Bigg Boss provided an additional supply of ration to the housemates, ensuring they had adequate resources for the following seven days.; On Day 7, following the completion of the Magical Well task, Bigg Boss requested that five housemates nominate two housemates who would be subject to punishment. Ranvir and Shivani were ultimately chosen for the penalty, which involved holding their ears and continuously circling the well desk in the living area while saying, "Mere Pyaare Ghar Waalo, Mujhe Maaf Kardo" (Translation: "My dear housemates, please forgive me"). The punishment continued until Bigg Boss announced it to be over. However, as the punishments were not fully carried out, Bigg Boss refrained from fulfilling any wishes made by the housemates during the task.
Week 1	Exits	On Day 5, Neeraj Goyat was evicted after facing the public vote.
Week 1	Exits	On Day 9, Payal Malik was evicted after facing the public vote.
Week 2	Head of House Task	None
Week 2	Head of House	None
Week 2	Baaharwala	Lovekesh Kataria
Week 2	Nominations	Nominations Ke Shikaar On Day 10, the housemates had to nominate in pairs with another housemate. They were given two options, and they had to save one and nominate the other for the midweek eviction process. They had 10 minutes to decide, and if they could not reach a decision, the pair would be nominated themselves.
Week 2	Nominations	Chandrika, Munisha, Naezy, Poulomi, Shivani and Vishal were nominated for second-week, mid-week eviction.
Week 2	Nominations	Jaadui Gufa On Day 13, the housemates were granted a certain number of nomination rights from a minimum one to a maximum six which were decided by Baaharwala. For nomination process, housemates had to come in Jaadui Gufa where number of lanterns that light up for them would indicate the number of nominations they can make.
Week 2	Nominations	Munisha, Sana M, Sana S, Deepak, Sai, Armaan, Ranvir and Vishal were nominated for second-week, weekend eviction.
Week 2	Tasks	Ration task - BB Puppet Making Factory On Day 11, a puppet show was set up in the garden area. Bigg Boss assigned three puppet masters, Ranvir, Vishal, and Shivani, who made puppets of housemates and created short shows to entertain the audience. The three puppet masters carried out their individual puppet shows. Other housemates were workers at the BB puppet making factory who made puppets for their favorite puppet master by taking material from the slide. Deepak assessed this task, quality checking all puppets, and whichever puppet master had five approved puppets would get time for shows according to the number of puppets.
Week 2	Tasks	The live audience served as judges and cast their votes to help their favorite puppet master win. After declaring the results, Vishal came first and won the premium ration for the house, where he had to choose any six items from a list. Shivani came second and won the regular ration for the house, where she had to choose any five items from the list. Ranvir came third and won the basic ration for the house, where he had to choose any four items from the list.: Position / Puppet master / Won / Chosen; 1 / Vishal / Premium ration / 6 kg rice 4 vegetables 5 kg flour Coffee; Ghee; Besan; 2 / Shivani / Regular ration / 2 kg rice 3 kg flour 3 kg mix lentils Jowar flour Poha; 3 / Ranvir / Basic ration / 2 vegetables 2 kg flour 2 kg mix lentils 1 crate eggs; Ultimately, Bigg Boss gave power to Baaharwala to choose final ration for house.: Ration type / Chosen; Premium ration / 6 kg rice 4 vegetables 5 kg flour Coffee; 2 kg chicken Besan; Regular ration / Gluten-free flour 10 packets of milk Potatoes; Tomatoes; Assorted fruits; Basic ration / Curd; Sooji; Tomato; 1 crate eggs
Week 2	Tasks	Stepper Chase On Day 12, Bigg Boss informed the housemates that the results for the midweek eviction had arrived, with Chandrika, Munisha, and Poulomi in the bottom three, and Munisha and Poulomi in the bottom two. However, the results had not been finalized as the Baaharwala would decide whom to evict from the bottom two. The bottom two could be changed if any housemate kept moving on the stepper in fire ring for one hour, as live voting would be opened for the bottom three once again. If the stepper kept running for one hour, the results of the one-hour live voting would be considered; if it kept running for two hours, the results of the two-hour live voting would be considered; and if it kept running for three hours, the results of the three-hour live voting would be considered. Until the stepper moved, the bottom three would remain on the hill.
Week 2	Tasks	The housemates continuously moved the stepper for three hours, and after the live voting results were considered, the bottom two housemates remained the same as in the previous voting round.
Week 2	Tasks	Kaun Hai Baaharwala? On Day 14, Bigg Boss instructed the housemates to find the Baaharwala among them by giving a task. The housemates had to choose two detectives among them who would be given the chance to interrogate three suspects among other housemates who they think could be the Baaharwala. The interrogation would take place for the time during which other housemates would have to perform certain other tasks. At the end, the detectives had to announce their verdict of their investigation that who is the Baaharwala.
Week 2	Tasks	The housemates chose Armaan and Sana M as the detectives who chose Chandrika, Shivani and Vishal as their suspects and Vishal bhabhi lover as their choice for the Baaharwala which was wrong. This resulted in Baaharwala Lovekesh's retention as Baaharwala.
Week 2	Sponsored	On Day 12, Lotus Herbals gifted two hampers of Lotus Herbals UltraRX Sunscreen Serum.
Week 2	Sponsored	On Day 13, Too Yumm presented a task to the housemates, requiring three pairs to perform a dance involving Too Yumm Chips packets. The winning pair would receive the key to the Too Yumm dispenser located in the garden area.: Team / Members; A / Vishal and Sana M; B / Lovekesh and Shivani; C / Sai and Sana S; The remaining housemates served as judges and ultimately decided to declare Vishal and Sana M as the winners of the dance competition.
Week 2	Events	On Day 11, Shivani complained about having head lice. In response, Bigg Boss sent medicated items for her to prevent other housemates from experiencing the same issue. Additionally, Bigg Boss advised all the housemates to remain vigilant and take necessary precautions to avoid the spread of lice.
Week 2	Punishments	On Day 16, Armaan Malik was nominated for the remainder of the season due to his act in physical violence with Vishal.
Week 2	Exits	On Day 12, Poulomi Das was evicted by Baaharwala.
Week 2	Exits	On Day 16, Munisha Khatwani was evicted after facing housemate's votes.
Week 3	Twists	On Day 18, Bigg Boss removed Lovekesh from his role as the Baaharwala.
Week 3	Twists	On Day 19, Bigg Boss re-appointed Lovekesh as the Baaharwala.
Week 3	Twists	On Day 19, Baaharwala Lovekesh accepted the choice given by Bigg Boss to prevent the midweek eviction by sacrificing half of the weekly ration.
Week 3	Head of House Task	None
Week 3	Head of House	None
Week 3	Baaharwala	Lovekesh Kataria
Week 3	Nominations	Letters On Day 17, all the housemates were given two letters each, which they would write to the two individuals they wanted to save from the midweek nomination process. They had the option to save anyone except for Armaan, who had already been nominated for the entire season due to his involvement in physical violence.
Week 3	Nominations	Armaan, Deepak, Lovekesh, Shivani and Vishal were nominated for third-week, mid-week eviction.
Week 3	Nominations	Nominations' medal distribution On Day 19, all the housemates were required to nominate two housemates each for eviction, excluding Armaan, by placing a 'Get Out Medal' on the housemate they chose. Armaan was already nominated as his punishment.
Week 3	Nominations	Armaan, Chandrika, Lovekesh, Shivani and Vishal were nominated for third-week, weekend eviction.
Week 3	Tasks	Faith of Lovekesh On Day 18, Bigg Boss informed the housemates that Baaharwala Lovekesh had been identified by Vishal, leading to his dismissal and elimination from the show. However, Bigg Boss offered a lifeline for those who wished to save Lovekesh; they had to keep rotating a 'chakki' until further instructions were given. After that, the audience would decide whether to keep Lovekesh in the show. During this time, Lovekesh was punished and handcuffed to a pillar until the next morning.
Week 3	Tasks	Sana M, Vishal and Shivani rotated the 'chakki' continuously which resulted in taking audience vote in consideration after which Lovekesh was saved by the audience votes the following day.
Week 3	Tasks	Aaj Ki Taaza Khabar with Deepak Chaurasia On Day 20, Bigg Boss assigned a task involving two reporters, Armaan and Sana S. They were responsible for interviewing the remaining housemates and collecting information about their personalities and thoughts. The collected pointers were then given to Deepak, who would present a news bulletin based on his selection of the gathered information. Additionally, the Baaharwala, Lovekesh, would secretly provide pointers to Deepak via Bigg Boss, which could also be included in the news bulletin. Lovekesh would be evaluated on how many of his pointers were selected by Deepak for the final broadcast.
Week 3	Tasks	Deepak selected five out of seven pointers of Baaharwala Lovekesh.
Week 3	Tasks	Naezy's rap concert On Day 21, Bigg Boss assigned a task where all housemates would prepare a diss on other housemates whom they wanted to target, pointing out flaws and shortcomings. These diss tracks would then be performed by Naezy. Naezy would select four housemates' disses to perform, and these four housemates would become the contenders for a special power. In the end, the Baaharwala, Lovekesh, would decide to whom he would grant the special power from the four contenders.
Week 3	Tasks	Naezy selected the diss tracks of Armaan, Ranvir, Sana M, and Sana S, making them contenders for the special power. The Baaharwala, Lovekesh, then selected Sana M to receive the special power, granting her the authority to run the house accordingly.
Week 3	Sponsored	On Day 20, Cera awarded a one-lakh gift voucher to Armaan for being selected as the Most Stylish Contestant by the majority of the housemates.
Week 3	Sponsored	On Day 21, Siggnature Elaichi gave a task to the housemates where they would give a Siggnature Elaichi box to the housemate with bitter tongue in their opinion.
Week 3	Punishments	On Day 18, Lovekesh's role as the Baaharwala was terminated after his identity was exposed. As a punishment, he was handcuffed to a pillar for the night.
Week 3	Exits	On Day 19, no eviction took place.
Week 3	Exits	On Day 23, Chandrika Dixit Gera was evicted after facing the public vote.
Week 4	Entrances	On Day 24, Adnaan Shaikh entered the house as a wildcard contestant.
Week 4	Twists	On Day 25, Bigg Boss removed Lovekesh from his role as the Baaharwaala.; On Day 25, Bigg Boss cancelled the nominations.
Week 4	Head of House Task	Chudail Ki Jaadui Kadahi On Day 26, the Head of House task was held in the activity area. Each housemate was given a test tube with red liquid, labeled with the name of another housemate. Whenever the sound of a witch was played, all housemates were to enter the activity area. In each round, two housemates came forward and emptied the test tube they were given, eliminating the housemate whose name was on the test tube from the race to become Head of House. In the end, the housemate whose test tube was still full became that week's Head of House.
Week 4	Head of House	Armaan Malik
Week 4	Baaharwala Gang	Audition for Baaharwaala On Day 25, Lovekesh's reign as the Baaharwaala came to an end. As a result, Bigg Boss announced that a new Baaharwaala would be chosen. The selection process involved each housemate entering the confession room individually to audition for the position of Baaharwaala, highlighting their strengths and reasons for being the best candidate for the role.
Week 4	Baaharwala Gang	Adnaan Shaikh
Week 4	Baaharwala Gang	Ranvir Shorey
Week 4	Baaharwala Gang	Vishal Pandey
Week 4	Nominations	Foam cake On Day 24, Bigg Boss called all the housemates into the garden area for the nominations process. Each housemate was tasked to apply shaving foam cake on the face of their two nominees along with giving them "I Hate You" stickboard.
Week 4	Nominations	~~Armaan, Kritika, Lovekesh, Naezy, Sai, Sana M and Sana S were nominated for fourth-week, midweek eviction.~~
Week 4	Nominations	On Day 25, Bigg Boss cancelled the nominations for that week and directly nominated Adnaan as a punishment for his lack of participation in the Baaharwala Gang's eviction decision, which involved choosing a housemate from the nominated contestants.
Week 4	Nominations	~~Adnaan and Armaan were nominated for fourth-week, weekend eviction.~~
Week 4	Nominations	On Day 27, Bigg Boss had announced that henceforth, only the Head of House would have the power to nominate housemates for eviction. Subsequently, Bigg Boss called Armaan Malik, the reigning Head of House, into the confession room to nominate four other housemates for eviction. Adnaan and Armaan had already been nominated for eviction as a punishment.
Week 4	Nominations	~~Adnaan, Armaan, Lovekesh, Sana M, Sana S and Vishal were nominated for fourth-week, weekend eviction.~~
Week 4	Nominations	As per the Power of Veto won by Ranvir he directly nominated Deepak after which, Adnaan, Armaan, Deepak, Lovekesh, Sana M, Sana S and Vishal were nominated for fourth-week, weekend eviction.
Week 4	Tasks	Power of Veto On Day 27, Bigg Boss tasked the Baaharwaala Gang with selecting four other housemates to participate in the Power of Veto task. The gang chose Naezy, Ranvir, Sai, and Shivani. A flower garden was set up in the garden area, featuring two bushes of flowers and four sand pits, each labeled with the image of a contender for the power. When the first buzzer sounded, each contender had to collect as many flowers as possible and plant them in their respective sand pit before the second buzzer. Other housemates could remove flowers from any sand pit they chose. Supervising the task, Deepak would announce the winner based on the contender who had the most flowers in their sand pit by the end. The winning housemate received the power to nominate another housemate for eviction.
Week 4	Tasks	Winner - Ranvir Shorey
Week 4	Tasks	Failed - Naezy, Sai & Shivani
Week 4	Tasks	Ration task - Vlog making On Day 28, the ration task was conducted. The task consisted of 3 rounds, each starting and ending with the cues "ACTION!" and "CUT!". In the first round, Lovekesh recorded a vlog on his phone, while Armaan and Kritika vlogged during the second round, and Shivani recorded a vlog in the final round. After all the vlogs were recorded, the live audience judged their performances and allocated one, two, or three minutes for the housemates to collect as much ration as possible.
Week 4	Tasks	After all the vlogs were recorded, the live audience judged their performances and granted the housemates three minutes to collect as much ration as possible. Armaan, as the Head of House, chose Lovekesh to collect the ration alongside him.
Week 4	Sponsored	On Day 27, Too Yumm gifted its products and a dispenser key containing products to the Head of the House, Armaan, who chose to share them with housemate Ranvir.; On Day 28, the OPPO F27 Pro+ 5G team conducted an in-house task where two teams competed in a relay. The first obstacle involved throwing a mobile against a grey stonewall. The second required completing two swimming laps with a mobile. Next, one housemate carried two mobiles as a human cart while the other teammate carried them. The final challenge was to locate a mobile hidden among five boxes. Deepak and Shivani supervised the task and announced the winners based on the shortest completion time. The winning team received OPPO F27 Pro+ 5G phones for each member, with the option to select one supervisor to whom they wanted to gift a phone.; Team A / Team B; Armaan; Kritika; Ranvir; Sana M Vishal / Adnaan; Lovekesh; Naezy; Sai; Sana S
Week 4	Punishments	On Day 25, Bigg Boss directly nominated Adnaan as a punishment for his lack of participation in the Baaharwala Gang's eviction decision, which involved choosing a housemate from the nominated contestants and cancelled all nominations for eviction.
Week 4	Exits	On Day 25, no eviction took place.
Week 4	Exits	On Day 30, Deepak Chaurasiya was evicted after facing the public vote.
Week 5	Twists	On Day 31, Bigg Boss had fired Baaharwala and confiscated all the housemates' mobile phones.; On Day 31, Bigg Boss introduced an eviction process where pairs or trios were directly evicted if they failed to count 13 minutes correctly, without any prior nominations.; On Day 32, Bigg Boss returned phones to all housemates and restored gas provision in the kitchen. Additionally, Bigg Boss reinstated the Baaharwala Gang comprising Ranvir and Sana M, issuing a warning to Sana M once again.; On Day 33, Bigg Boss asked Head of House Ranvir Shorey whether he wanted to save Armaan from this week's nomination. Ranvir chose to save Armaan.
Week 5	Head of House Task	Zombie Attack On Day 32, the Head of House task was set up in the garden area. There were eight rounds. In each round, the housemates had to race from one end of the garden area to the other when the zombies growled. To advance to the next round, the housemates had to cross the finish line inside a bunker. The housemate who crossed the finish line last was eliminated from the task. While waiting for the zombies to growl, the housemates had to entertain the two zombies at the starting line. The housemate who won all eight rounds would be crowned the next Head of House.
Week 5	Head of House	Ranvir Shorey
Week 5	Baaharwala Gang	Ranvir Shorey; Sana Makbul
Week 5	Nominations	Nomination Ka Power On Day 33, Bigg Boss called Ranvir Shorey, the reigning Head of House, into the confession room to nominate three other housemates for eviction. Armaan had already been nominated for eviction as a punishment.
Week 5	Nominations	Lovekesh, Shivani and Vishal were nominated for fifth-week eviction.
Week 5	Tasks	Elimination Task On Day 31, all housemates were nominated for eviction. A seesaw was placed in the garden along with a clock and gong. Each pair of housemates sat on the seesaw to count 13 minutes. When the pair's or trio's counting was complete, they had to ring the gong to indicate that their counting had ended. At the end, the pair with the count furthest from 13 minutes was evicted.: Sr.No. / Pair/Trio; 1 / Vishal; Sana M; 2 / Naezy; Armaan; 3 / Adnaan; Sana S; 4 / Ranvir; Sai; Shivani; 5 / Lovekesh; Kritika
Week 5	Tasks	Ration Task - Market of Ilzaams On Day 33, Bigg Boss collected all the existing ration from the house and provided new supplies in its place. After the collection, Bigg Boss called all the housemates to the garden, where the new ration was displayed in trays and carts. The housemates then formed two teams of their own choosing for a task. Each team had to accuse the other team of various shortcomings and defend themselves against the accusations. Ranvir, as the head of the house, would listen to both sides and, at the end, distribute the trays or carts of ration based on his decision. Each team would have to consume only the ration they received, and Ranvir could take from either team if he chose. This would be the last ration provided to the housemates.: Team A / Team B; Armaan; Kritika; Sai / Lovekesh; Naezy; Sana M Shivani; Vishal
Week 5	Tasks	BB Elections On Day 34, Bigg Boss gave the nominated housemates—Lovekesh, Shivani and Vishal—a chance to make a vote appeal to avoid eviction. Each nominated housemate would first conduct an election campaign by giving a speech in which they would highlight the weaknesses and drawbacks of their competitors. In the second round, they would entertain the other housemates. Finally, a rally would be organized by their supporters for publicity. After the task was completed, Bigg Boss called each housemate into the confession room, where they cast their votes in a secret ballot to evict one of the nominated housemates. The results would be announced on the weekend, and one housemate would be evicted.
Week 5	Sponsored	On Day 31, Prashant Dev Sharma, winner of Too Yumm Chips Khaao, Bigg Boss OTT Jaao contest, entered house and interacted with housemates.; On Day 33, Dyson Airstrait gifted their hair straightener to Sana M, as she was the winner of the contest held for it.; On Day 34, Sofy Anti Bacteria conducted a task in which three teams of male housemates created hampers filled with pads, soft care tools, toys, chocolates, and other items for the female housemates. The female housemates then mutually decided on a winning team, and the winning team gifted their hamper to one of their favorite female housemates.; Team A / Team B / Team C; Armaan; Ranvir / Naezy; Sai / Lovekesh; Vishal; Armaan and Ranvir gifted hamper to Kritika.
Week 5	Punishments	On Day 31, two members of the Baaharwala Gang, Adnaan and Vishal, were dismissed. Adnaan was removed due to his lack of activity in the gang's decisions, and Vishal, who supported Adnaan in his decisions, was also let go. Ranvir, however, remained in the Baaharwala Gang as he had made no mistakes. Sana M was initially included in the gang with Ranvir, but when Sana M's identity as Baaharwala was exposed, Bigg Boss disbanded the Baaharwala Gang, resulting in the collection of all housemates' mobile phones. Additionally, Bigg Boss confiscated all cooked items in the house and suspended all gas services until further notice.
Week 5	Exits	On Day 31, Sana Sultaan Khan was evicted for counting more than 13 minutes as a pair compared to the other housemates.
Week 5	Exits	On Day 31, Adnaan Shaikh was evicted for counting more than 13 minutes as a pair compared to the other housemates.
Week 5	Exits	On Day 36, Shivani Kumari was evicted by a majority of the housemates' votes.
Week 5	Exits	On Day 36, Vishal Pandey was evicted after facing the public vote.
Week 6 FINALE WEEK	Twists	On Day 37, a press conference was held in house with Top 7 contestants of Bigg Boss OTT 3
Week 6 FINALE WEEK	Twists	On Day 40, Bigg Boss revealed all the Baaharwalas who had been introduced from the first day up to that date, along with the decisions they had made. Bigg Boss also expressed appreciation for the housemates who had served as Baaharwalas. Later, Bigg Boss announced that the Baaharwala concept had come to an end and confiscated the phones of all housemates following the evictions of Lovekesh and Armaan.
Week 6 FINALE WEEK	Twists	On Day 40, Bigg Boss gathered all the housemates in the activity area and revealed the trophy for BB OTT 3. Bigg Boss then asked the housemates to vote for one of the nominated contestants whom they wanted to evict from the show. With a majority of votes cast against Lovekesh, he was evicted.
Week 6 FINALE WEEK	Twists	On Day 40, Bigg Boss sent in a cake to congratulate the Top 5.
Week 6 FINALE WEEK	Twists	On Day 40, Bigg Boss kept pre-finale party where Meet Bros, Shibani Kashyap, Nikhita Gandhi, Sanju Rathod, Nakash Aziz performed and entertained the housemates.
Week 6 FINALE WEEK	Twists	On Grand Finale, the Top 5 wrote farewell messages for each other.
Week 6 FINALE WEEK	Twists	During the Grand Finale, Bigg Boss sent gift boxes to the Top 5 contestants through their loved ones. These boxes were opened when host Anil Kapoor asked them to. After opening the gift boxes, the Top 4 contestants progressed to the next stage, and one contestant was evicted. As a result, Kritika Malik was announced as the 4th Runner-up.
Week 6 FINALE WEEK	Twists	During the Grand Finale, Rajkummar Rao and Shraddha Kapoor entered the house to eliminate one housemate and narrow the contestants down to the Top 3. The Top 4 stood next to statues representing them. Rajkummar Rao held strings connected to the heads of statues for Sai and Naezy, while Shraddha Kapoor held strings for Ranvir and Sana M. When the strings were pulled, the head of Sai's statue came off, indicating his eviction from the Top 4. As a result, Sai Ketan Rao was announced as the 3rd Runner-up.
Week 6 FINALE WEEK	Twists	During the Grand Finale, after Ranvir Shorey was announced as the 2nd Runner-up, host Anil Kapoor revealed that live voting would be open for 10 minutes to determine the winner between the Top 2 contestants, Sana M and Naezy. As Sana M and Naezy took the stage following a farewell message from Bigg Boss, the live voting period ended. The results declared Sana M as the winner and Naezy as the 1st Runner-up.
Week 6 FINALE WEEK	Head of House	None
Week 6 FINALE WEEK	Baaharwala Gang	Ranvir Shorey; Sana Makbul
Week 6 FINALE WEEK	Nominations	On Day 38, two teams, each consisting of three housemates, competed against each other. The losing team would have all its members nominated for eviction. The task required Team A and then Team B to nominate one member each to participate in a challenge. This challenge involved the nominated members hanging on a guillotine while attempting to keep smiling, despite the efforts of their opponents to make them frown. Armaan, who had already been nominated by Bigg Boss, would assess the task.: Team A / Team B; Kritika; Naezy; Ranvir / Lovekesh; Sai; Sana M
Week 6 FINALE WEEK	Nominations	Armaan, Lovekesh, Sai, Sana M were nominated for final week's midweek eviction.
Week 6 FINALE WEEK	Tasks	BB Roast: On Day 39, Bigg Boss invited BB17 winner Munawar Faruqui and stand-up comedian Aditi Mittal to entertain the housemates with a roast of the individual contestants. They were joined by three house roasters—Armaan, Lovekesh, and Ranvir. All of them participated in this entertaining activity.
Week 6 FINALE WEEK	Sponsored	On Day 38, the Honda SP160 - Play It Bold Challenge was introduced, in which three teams were tasked with creating jingles highlighting the features of the bike. The jingles needed to prominently include the words "Dreams," "Honda SP160," and "Play It Bold." The teams had 10 minutes to prepare their jingles before performing them while sitting on the bike. At the end of the challenge, Judge Kritika declared one team as the winner, who would receive individual hampers from Honda. The winning team then had to decide whether to give a hamper to the judge or not.; Team A / Team B / Team C; Ranvir; Sai / Lovekesh; Sana M / Armaan; Naezy; Armaan and Naezy also gifted a hamper to Judge Kritika.: On Day 40, Kellogg's provided breakfast for the housemates, featuring their Muesli products.; During the Grand Finale, the Honda SP160 bike was gifted to Lovekesh, who had won the most weekly contests associated with the bike.
Week 6 FINALE WEEK	Exits	On Day 40, Lovekesh Kataria was evicted by a majority of the housemates' votes.
Week 6 FINALE WEEK	Exits	On Day 40, Armaan Malik was evicted after facing the public vote.
Week 6 FINALE WEEK	Day 42 Grand Finale	
Week 6 FINALE WEEK	4th Runner-up	Kritika Malik
Week 6 FINALE WEEK	3rd Runner-up	Sai Ketan Rao
Week 6 FINALE WEEK	2nd Runner-up	Ranvir Shorey
Week 6 FINALE WEEK	1st Runner-up	Naezy
Week 6 FINALE WEEK	Winner	Sana Makbul

== Nominations table ==
	Week 1			Week 2				Week 3		Week 4			Week 5			Week 6			
	Day 3	Day 6	Day 9	Day 10	Day 12	Day 13	Day 16	Day 17	Day 19	Day 24	Day 25	Day 26	Day 31	Day 33	Day 34	Day 38	Day 40		Day 42
Nominees for Head of House	No Head of House											All; Housemates				No Head of House			
Head of House	No Head of House											Armaan		Ranvir		No Head of House			
Head of House's Nominations	No Head of House											Lovekesh; Sana M Sana S Vishal	Passed	Armaan (to save); Lovekesh; Shivani; Vishal (to evict)	Lovekesh	No Head of House			
Baaharwala / Baaharwala Gang	Sana S		Sai	Lovekesh							Adnaan Ranvir Vishal		~~Ranvir~~ ~~Sana M~~	Ranvir Sana M				No Baaharwala / Baaharwala Gang	
Baaharwala's Nominations / Baaharwala Gang's decision	Neeraj; Shivani	Armaan; Kritika	Deepak; Armaan; Sana S (to save)	Kritika (to save); Naezy (to evict)	Poulomi	Ranvir; Sana S	Sana S	Shivani; Vishal (to save)	Chandrika; Sana S	Ranvir; Sana S	Not eligible	Not eligible	None	Not eligible	None	Won	Lovekesh	No Baaharwala / Baaharwala Gang	
Baaharwala's Nominations / Baaharwala Gang's decision	Neeraj; Shivani	Armaan; Kritika	Deepak; Armaan; Sana S (to save)	Kritika (to save); Naezy (to evict)	Poulomi	Ranvir; Sana S	Sana S	Shivani; Vishal (to save)	Chandrika; Sana S	Ranvir; Sana S	Not eligible	Deepak	None	Not eligible	None	Won	Lovekesh	No Baaharwala / Baaharwala Gang	
Baaharwala's Nominations / Baaharwala Gang's decision	Neeraj; Shivani	Armaan; Kritika	Deepak; Armaan; Sana S (to save)	Kritika (to save); Naezy (to evict)	Poulomi	Ranvir; Sana S	Sana S	Shivani; Vishal (to save)	Chandrika; Sana S	Ranvir; Sana S	Not eligible	Not eligible	None	Not eligible	Shivani	Lost	Sai	No Baaharwala / Baaharwala Gang	
Vote to:	Evict		None	Save/Evict	Evict			Save	Evict		None	Evict	13-Min	Evict		Task	Evict	WIN	
Sana M	Sai; Sana S	Sai; Sana S	Not eligible	Kritika (to save); Naezy (to evict)	Poulomi	Deepak; Sana S	Sana S	Chandrika; Naezy	Deepak; Sana S	Sai; Sana S	Not eligible	Nominated by Head of House	Passed	Baaharwala Gang				No; Nominations	Winner (Day 42)
Naezy	Lovekesh; Shivani	Payal; Shivani	Not eligible	Sai (to save); Chandrika (to evict)	Munisha	Shivani	Munisha	Sai; Sana S	Lovekesh; Shivani	Kritika; Shivani	Not eligible	Not eligible	Passed	Not eligible	Shivani	Won	Armaan	No; Nominations	1st runner-up (Day 42)
Ranvir	Deepak; Lovekesh	Lovekesh; Vishal	Not eligible	Sai (to save); Chandrika (to evict)	Poulomi	Vishal	Munisha	Deepak; Sai	Lovekesh; Vishal	Lovekesh; Sana M	Baaharwala Gang		13:46	Head of House Baaharwala Gang		Baaharwala Gang		No; Nominations	2nd runner-up (Day 42)
Sai	Sana M Vishal	Lovekesh; Sana M	Baaharwala	Ranvir (to save); Shivani (to evict)	Munisha	Sana M	Munisha	Ranvir; Sana S	Shivani; Vishal	Lovekesh; Sana M	Not eligible	Not eligible	13:46	Not eligible	Lovekesh	Lost	Lovekesh	No; Nominations	3rd runner-up (Day 42)
Kritika	Deepak; Naezy	Deepak; Sana S	Not eligible	Armaan (to save)	Munisha	Deepak; Munisha; Sana S	Munisha	Ranvir; Sana S	Shivani; Vishal	Vishal; Sana M	Not eligible	Not eligible	Passed	Not eligible	Vishal	Won	Lovekesh	No; Nominations	4th runner-up (Day 42)
Armaan	Sai; Sana S	Not eligible	Not eligible	Sana M (to save); Vishal (to evict)	Munisha	Munisha; Sana M Vishal	Munisha	Kritika; Ranvir	Shivani; Vishal	Naezy; Sana M	Nominated; Not eligible	Nominated; Head of House		Saved by Head of House	Vishal	Nominated	Lovekesh	Evicted (Day 40)	
Lovekesh	Ranvir; Sai	Sai; Sana S	Not eligible	Baaharwala							Not eligible	Nominated by Head of House	Passed	Nominated by Head of House	Shivani	Lost	Armaan	Evicted by Housemates (Day 40)	
Vishal	Poulomi; Ranvir	Armaan; Sai	Not eligible	Armaan (to save)	Poulomi	Armaan; Deepak; Ranvir; Sai	Sana S	Lovekesh; Sana M	Chandrika; Kritika	Kritika; Sai	Baaharwala Gang	Nominated by Head of House; Baaharwala Gang	Passed	Nominated by Head of House	Shivani	Evicted (Day 36)			
Shivani	Poulomi; Sai	Armaan; Poulomi	Not eligible	Deepak (to save); Munisha (to evict)	Poulomi	Armaan; Ranvir; Sai; Sana S	Munisha	Chandrika; Sana M	Chandrika; Kritika	Naezy; Sai	Not eligible	Not eligible	13:46	Nominated by Head of House	Vishal	Evicted by Housemates (Day 36)			
Sana S	Baaharwala		Not eligible	Ranvir (to save); Shivani (to evict)	Munisha	Sana M	Not eligible	Naezy; Sai	Lovekesh; Sana M	Lovekesh; Sana M	Not eligible	Nominated by Head of House	16:49	Evicted (Day 31)					
Adnaan	Not in House										Nominated; Baaharwala Gang		16:49	Evicted (Day 31)					
Deepak	Munisha; Sana S	Munisha; Payal	Not eligible	Sana M (to save); Vishal (to evict)	Munisha	Kritika; Munisha	Munisha	Chandrika; Ranvir	Lovekesh; Sana M	Lovekesh; Sana M	Not eligible	Nominated by Power of Veto	Evicted (Day 30)						
Chandrika	Ranvir; Sana S	Not eligible	Not eligible	Deepak (to save); Munisha (to evict)	Not eligible	Sai; Sana S	Munisha	Kritika; Sana M	Lovekesh; Vishal	Evicted (Day 23)									
Munisha	Deepak; Naezy	Armaan; Deepak	Not eligible	Nominated	Not eligible	Armaan; Deepak; Sai	Not eligible	Evicted by Housemates (Day 16)											
Poulomi	Ranvir; Vishal	Armaan; Shivani	Not eligible	Nominated	Not eligible	Evicted by Baaharwala (Day 12)													
Payal	Sai; Sana S	Not eligible	Evicted (Day 9)																
Neeraj	Munisha; Sana S	Evicted (Day 5)																	
Notes	1	2, 3	4	5	6	7	8	9, 10, 11	9, 12	9, 13	9, 14	9, 15	16	9, 17	18	9, 19	20	21	
Against Public Vote	Neeraj; Shivani	~~Armaan~~; ~~Deepak~~; Lovekesh; Payal; ~~Sai~~; ~~Sana S~~; Shivani		Chandrika; Naezy; Munisha; Poulomi; Shivani; Vishal	~~Chandrika~~; Munisha; Poulomi	Armaan; Deepak; Munisha; Ranvir; Sai; Sana M Sana S Vishal	Munisha; Sana S	Armaan; Deepak; Lovekesh; Shivani; Vishal	Armaan; Chandrika; ~~Lovekesh~~; Shivani; Vishal	~~Armaan~~; ~~Kritika~~; ~~Lovekesh~~; ~~Naezy~~; ~~Sai~~; ~~Sana M~~; ~~Sana S~~	Adnaan; Armaan; Deepak; Lovekesh; Sana M Sana S Vishal		Adnaan; Armaan; Kritika; Lovekesh; Naezy; Ranvir; Sai; Sana M Sana S Shivani; Vishal	~~Armaan~~; Lovekesh; Shivani; Vishal	Lovekesh; Shivani; Vishal	Armaan; Lovekesh; Sai; ~~Sana M~~	Armaan; Lovekesh; Sai	Kritika Naezy Ranvir Sai Sana M	
Evicted	Neeraj	Payal		Poulomi		Munisha		No; Eviction	Chandrika	No; Eviction	Deepak		Adnaan	Shivani		Lovekesh		Kritika	Sai
Evicted	Neeraj	Payal		Poulomi		Munisha		No; Eviction	Chandrika	No; Eviction	Deepak		Adnaan	Shivani		Lovekesh		Ranvir	
Evicted	Neeraj	Payal		Poulomi		Munisha		No; Eviction	Chandrika	No; Eviction	Deepak		Sana S	Vishal		Armaan		Naezy	Sana M

Color keys

indicates the Baaharwala.
indicates the House Captain.
indicates the nominees for house captaincy.
indicates that the Housemate was safe prior to nominations.
indicates that the Housemate was directly nominated for eviction before the regular nominations process.
indicates the winner.
indicates the first runner-up.
indicates the second runner-up.
indicates the third runner-up.
indicates the fourth runner-up.
indicates that the contestant has re-entered the house.
indicates that the contestant walked out of the show.
indicates that the contestant was ejected from the house.
indicates that the contestant was evicted.

Nomination notes

- ^1: On Day 3, each housemate was required to nominate two other housemates for the eviction process. However, Bigg Boss introduced a twist, which meant that only the nominations made by the Baaharwala, Sana S were accepted and finalized.
- ^2: On Day 6, Bigg Boss instructed the Baaharwala, Sana S, to choose three housemates who would be exempt from the nomination process. The Bahaarwaala selected Armaan, Payal, and Chandrika, rendering them ineligible to vote in the upcoming eviction proceedings. Following this decision, each housemate was then required to nominate two other contestants for eviction.
- ^3: On Day 6, Sana S was removed from her role as the Baaharwala, as discreetly announced by Bigg Boss.
- ^4: On Day 9, Sai's wish to save Armaan and Deepak from nominations was granted. He was immuned from the nominations but he gave up his power of Baaharwala to save Sana S from nominations.
- ^5: On Day 10, housemates were required to nominate in pairs with another housemate. They had the option of choosing between two other housemates, one whom they wanted to save and one whom they wanted to nominate for eviction. If the pair couldn't reach a mutual agreement on a decision, the pair itself would be nominated, and both of their options would be directly saved.
- ^6: On Day 12, live voting was opened for three hours to determine the bottom two among the bottom three housemates. Once the voting period concluded, the Baaharwala, Lovekesh, made the final decision on whom to evict from the bottom two.
- ^7: On Day 13, Bigg Boss granted the Baaharwala, Lovekesh, the right to allot a certain number of nomination rights to all the housemates, ranging from one to six. After receiving their respective nomination rights, the housemates proceeded to make their nominations.
- ^8: On Day 16, Munisha Khatwani and Sana S were declared as the bottom two contestants. The housemates, excluding Munisha and Sana S, had to vote to evict one of them from the Bigg Boss house.
- ^9: On Day 16, host Anil Kapoor announced the nomination of Armaan Malik for the remainder of the season as a consequence of his act of physical violence towards fellow housemate Vishal Pandey.
- ^10: On Day 17, each housemate received two letters to write to two fellow housemates, granting them immunity from nominations.
- ^11: On Day 19, Baaharwala, Lovekesh saved all nominated contestants by sacrificing half of the ration of that week.
- ^12: On Day 19, each housemate was required to nominate two other housemates for the eviction process.
- ^13: On Day 24, each housemate was required to nominate two other housemates for the eviction process.
- ^14: On Day 25, Bigg Boss cancelled the nominations for that week and directly nominated Adnaan as a punishment for his lack of participation in the Baaharwala Gang's eviction decision, which involved choosing a housemate from the nominated contestants.
- ^15: On Day 26, Bigg Boss gave power of nomination to Head of House Armaan where he could nominate four more housemates along with him and Adnaan who were nominated by Bigg Boss as punishment while Ranvir got nomination power by winning power of vetto where he could nominate one more housemate for eviction.
- ^16: On Day 31, all housemates had to count 13 minutes in pair allocated by Bigg Boss. A pair who will be far from count of 13 minutes will be evicted directly.
- ^17: On Day 33, Bigg Boss gave power of nomination to Head of House Ranvir where he could nominate three housemates as well as Bigg Boss asked Ranvir whether he wanted to save Armaan or not while Armaan would be replaced by other housemate.
- ^18: On Day 34, Bigg Boss asked all housemates to nominate one nominated housemate in secret ballot who would be evicted in weekend.
- ^19: On Day 38, two teams competed against each other comprising three housemates. At the end, whichever team loses task, all its members will be nominated for eviction.
- ^20: On Day 40, Bigg Boss asked each housemate to nominate one housemate from nominated category who should be evicted.
- ^21: On Day 40, All housemates were nominated for winning the season.

== Guest appearances ==
Week(s)	Day(s)	Guest(s)	Notes
Grand Premiere	Day 0	Shobhaa De	To introduce and interview housemate Deepak Chaurasia
Grand Premiere	Day 0	Anasuya Roy (Deepak's wife)	To introduce and interview housemate Deepak Chaurasia
Week 1	Day 9	Aekta Brahmbhatt	To analyse the housemates and events of the season with the host, Anil Kapoor
Week 1	Day 9	Lakshya and Raghav Juyal	To promote their film Kill
Week 1	Day 9	Raftaar	To promote his song Morni
Week 1	Day 9	Yuvraj Dua	To give his opinion on the housemates
Week 2	Day 16	Payal Malik and Shivangi Khedkar	To discuss certain complaints regarding the housemates
Week 2	Day 16	Ammy Virk and Vicky Kaushal	To promote their film Bad Newz and conduct a task
Week 3	Day 23	Riteish Deshmukh	To promote his web-series Pill
Week 3	Day 23	Ravi Kishan	To share his opinion regarding Shivani
Week 3	Day 23	Brahmadev Pandey and Renu Pandey	To interact with their son Vishal
Week 4	Day 30	Elvish Yadav and Faisal Shaikh	To support their friend Lovekesh and Adnaan
Week 5	Day 36	Janhvi Kapoor	To promote her film Ulajh
Week 6	Day 39	Munawar Faruqui	To interview housemates and entertain them by performing roast.
Week 6	Day 39	Aditi Mittal	To entertain housemates by performing roast.
Week 6	Day 39	Priyanka Chahar Choudhary & Tusshar Kapoor	To promote their web series Dus June Ki Raat
Week 6	Day 40	Meet Bros, Shibani Kashyap, Sanju Rathod, Nikhita Gandhi & Nakash Aziz	For the live concert.
Grand Finale	Day 43	Shehnaaz Gill, Shivangi Khedkar, Shahid Raza, Lalita Basra and Shafa Naeem Khan	To support their housemates.
Grand Finale	Day 43	Rajkummar Rao and Shraddha Kapoor	To promote their movie Stree 2.
Grand Finale	Day 43	Ayaan Agnihotri, Payal Dev and Aditya Dev	To promote their song Party Fever.

== Reception ==
The series premiere episode was reviewed by Grace Cyril for Times Now. She wrote, "Once a powerhouse of entertainment, this season seems to have started on dull note. The High-voltage drama fell flat largely, making it a snooze fest."

Pratidin Time wrote, "While Kapoor exuded his signature suave charm, attempts to engage the audience fell short, perhaps due to peculiar editing choices that diluted the impact, evident in the disjointed laughter track. Even the introduction of the first contestant, the Vada Pav Girl, lacked the anticipated punch."
