= Neer Bhare Tere Naina Devi =

Indian television series

- Created by: Shakuntalam Telefilms
- Developed by: Anshuman Kishore Singh, Inder Das
- Starring: See below
- Country of origin: India
- Original language: Hindi
- No. of episodes: 88

Production
- Producers: Shyamashish Bhattacharya; Neelima Bajpai
- Camera setup: Multi-camera
- Production company: Shakuntalam Telefilms

Original release
- Network: Imagine TV
- Release: 18 January – 16 July 2010

Neer Bhare Tere Naina Devi is a 2010 Indian television drama series on Imagine TV, starring Dipika Kakar in her television debut. The series also starred Reem Shaikh playing the lead role of Devi as a child. Produced by Shakuntalam Telefilms, it was directed by Anshuman Kishore Singh. It premiered on 18 January 2010 and ended on 16 July 2010.

== Plot ==
Laxmi is born to an extremely poor family in a drought-stricken village, craving for rain. Her father, who is in no position to feed her, decides to abandon her in the village temple. However, at that very moment, the rain gods smile on the village and a three-year-long drought is broken. Laxmi is proclaimed to be the bearer of this good fortune and is bestowed the status of a Goddess.

While she receives special care and attention, she is also forced to lead an abnormal life, very different from a regular girl her age. The story traces Devi's exploitation at the hands of the village, entrenched in blind faith and superstition.

== Cast ==
- Dipika Kakar Ibrahim as Devi
  - Reem Sheikh as Devi (kid)
- Deepali Pansare as Suhaagi
- Akshita Rajput as Dhaniyaa
- Hemant Pandey as Ghasita
- Abhaas Mehta as Pranay
- Nimai Bali as Chaudhary
- Sumon Chakravarti
- Alpesh Gehlot
- Chitrapama Bannerjee
- Parth Shukla
- Ram Met har Jangra
