= Nee Naan Kaadhal =

Indian Tamil television series (2023-2025)

- Genre: Romance; Drama
- Based on: Iss Pyaar Ko Kya Naam Doon?
- Written by: Kavya, Shivakanth
- Directed by: Rajan Sundaram
- Starring: Prem Jacob; Varshini Suresh
- Music by: James Victor
- Country of origin: India
- Original language: Tamil
- No. of episodes: 384

Production
- Executive producer: Radhamurugan
- Producer: Thaai Creations
- Camera setup: Multi-camera
- Running time: 22 minutes
- Production company: Thai Creations

Original release
- Network: Star Vijay
- Release: 13 November 2023 – 25 April 2025

Nee Naan Kaadhal (transl. You, Me and Love) was a 2023-2025 Indian Tamil drama television series that aired on Star Vijay from 13 November 2023 to 25 April 2025 for 384 episodes. It starred Prem Jacob and Varshini Suresh with VJ Dhanusek Vijayakumar (who later replaced by Suwetha), Saai Gayathri (who later replaced by Asritha Sreedas later rereplaced by Saai Gayathri), Shankaresh Kumar and Naveen Muralidhar.

The series was a remake of Hindi series Iss Pyaar Ko Kya Naam Doon?, which aired on Star Plus. The story was about a rich short-tempered businessman and a self-respected middle-class woman, whilst the series was directed by Raja Sundaram and produced by Malarvizhi Thaiselvam under the banner of Thaai Creations.

== Plot ==
Abi, an outgoing woman from a middle-class family, takes charge in helping her parents organize her older sister Anu's wedding. While collecting funds from her uncle, Abi mistakenly ends up at a textile convention where she unexpectedly crosses paths with Raghav. Later, due to an unfortunate mix-up, they are found together in a hotel room, and photos of them surface online, causing a scandal that ultimately leads to Anu's wedding being called off.

In the aftermath, Abi and Anu move to Chennai to stay with their aunt, Andal. However, fate brings Abi face-to-face with Raghav once more. Raghav, still haunted by the pain of a past relationship, struggles with the mistakes he made, which had led him to drink that fateful night. Meanwhile, Anu catches the attention of Akash, Raghav's cousin, who is deeply infatuated with her and pursues her despite her reluctance.

The story unfolds as Abi and Raghav gradually grow closer and learn to heal through their connection, while their siblings navigate their own complex relationships, shaping a journey of love, growth, and second chances.

== Cast ==
=== Main ===
- Prem Jacob as Ravi Raghavendra "Raghav", Abi's husband, Madhumitha's ex-lover, Manohar's son, Sundari's stepson, Anjali's younger brother and Akash half-elder brother.
- Varshini Suresh as Abinaya "Abi" Sivaraman, Raghav's wife, Murali and Vignesh's ex-fiancé, Parvathi and Sivaraman's younger daughter.
- VJ Dhanusek Vijayakumar (2023–2025) / Suwetha (2025) as Anjali, Sundari's stepdaughter, Raghav's sister, Akash's half-sister and Muralikrishnan's widow.
- Naveen Muralidhar as Muralikrishnan "Murali" "Krishna", Anjali's husband, Abi's ex-fiancé. (Main Antagonist) (Dead)
- Saai Gayathri (2023–2024;2025) / Asritha Sreedas (Sept.2024–2025) as Anuradha "Anu" Sivaraman, Akash's wife, Parvathi and Sivaraman's elder daughter.
- Shankaresh Kumar as Akash Kumar "Akash" Manohar, Anu's husband, Manohar and Sundari's son, Anjali and Raghav's younger half-brother.

=== Supporting ===
- Sheela as Lakshmi Devi, Manohar's mother, Anjali, Raghav and Akash's grandmother
- Shravan (2023) / Arvind Kathare (2024–2025) as Manohar, Sundari's husband, Anjali, Raghav and Akash's father
- Harsha Nair as Sundari, Manohar's second wife, Akash's mother, Anjali and Raghav's stepmother. (Antagonist)
- Tamil Selvi as Parvathi, Sivaraman's wife, Abinaya and Anu's mother
- Girish as Sivaraman, Parvathi's husband, Abinaya and Anu's father
- Sangeetha Balan as Aandal, Abinaya and Anu's aunt; Sivaraman's elder sister
- Madhumitha Ilayaraja as Lavanya, Raghav's personal assistant who has a one-sided crush on him.
- Pazhani Pattalam as Mastan Bhai, the owner of Suleiman's restaurant; Anu's and Aandal's neighbour, employer and friend
- Dhroshni Sekar as Madhumitha alias Madhu, Vimal's wife, Raghav's ex-lover
- Thejank as Vimal, Madhu's husband

== Production ==
=== Development ===
StarPlus's fictional drama Iss Pyaar Ko Kya Naam Doon? was remade on Star Maa in 2022 as Nuvvu Nenu Prema in Telugu. Due to the success of the series in Telugu language, Thaai Creations company decided to produce it in Tamil as well. It was announced on Friday 1 September 2023 that the series will be released on Star Vijay. Raja Sundaram has directed the series that deals with the romantic story.

=== Casting ===
Newcomers Prem Jacob and Varshini Suresh was cast in the main role in the serial. Saai Gayathri was cast in the second lead role in the serial, returning to after Pandian Stores nearly one years and she quit the series replaced by Asritha Sreedas in September 2024. However, Saai Gayathri returned as Anuradha in March 2025, replacing Asritha Sreedas. Shankaresh Kumar who plays the lead alongside her. Naveen Muralidhar was cast as in a negative role, marking his return to television after Paavam Ganesan.

In March 2025, Actor Thejank was joined as Vimal.

=== Adaptations ===
Language	Title	Original release	Network(s)	Last aired	Notes
Hindi	Iss Pyaar Ko Kya Naam Doon? इस प्यार को क्या नाम दूं?	6 June 2011	StarPlus	30 November 2012	Original
Bengali	Bojhena Se Bojhena বোঝেনা সে বোঝেনা	4 November 2013	Star Jalsha	18 June 2016	Remake
Telugu	Nuvvu Nenu Prema నువ్వు నేను ప్రేమ	16 May 2022	Star Maa	11 November 2024	Remake
Tamil	Nee Naan Kaadhal நீ நான் காதல்	13 November 2023	Star Vijay	25 April 2025	Remake
Malayalam	Etho Janma Kalpanayil ഏതോ ജന്മ കല്പനയിൽ	29 January 2024	Asianet	29 August 2025	Remake
