= Ajit Anjum =

Indian journalist

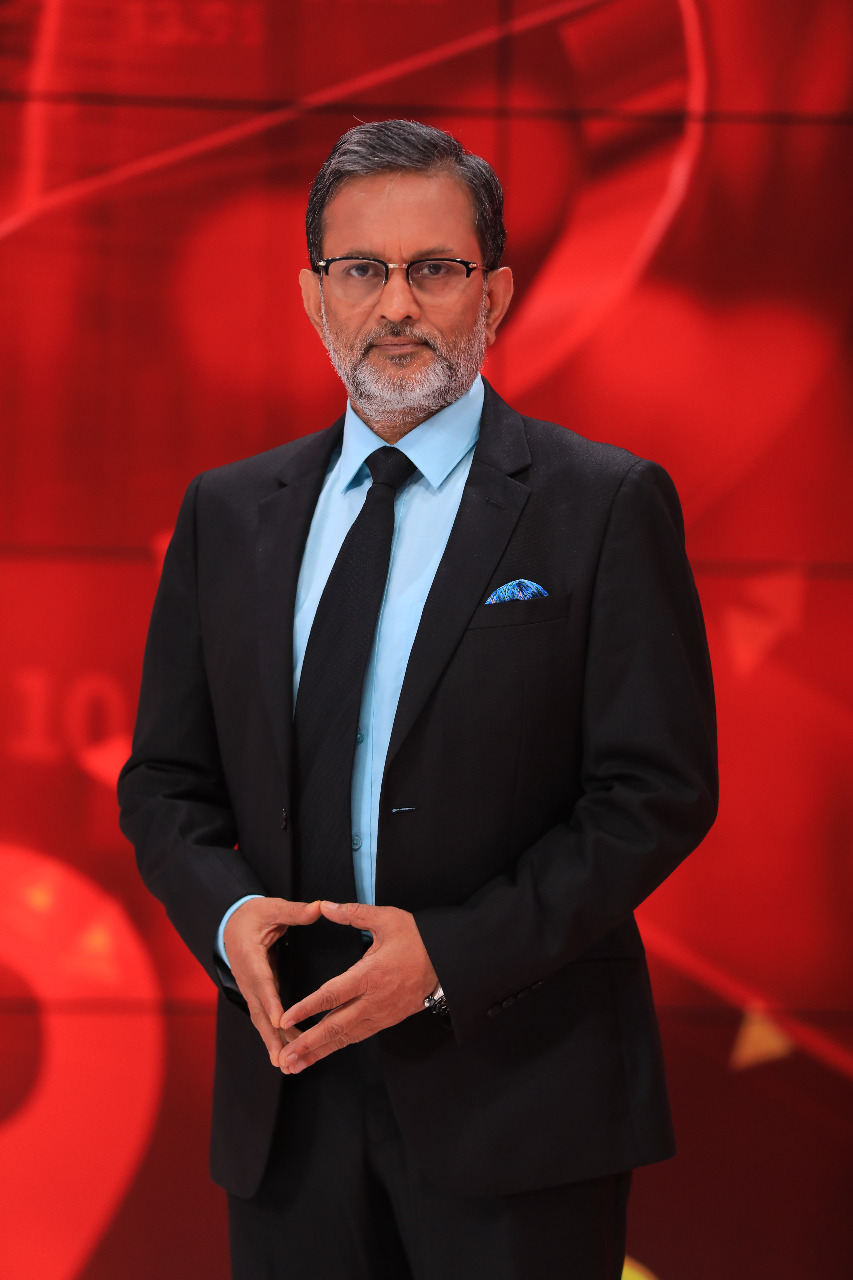
- Born: 7 April 1969 (age 57); Begusarai, Bihar, India
- Education: Bihar University, Muzaffarpur
- Occupation: Journalist
- Years active: 1989–present
- Spouse: Geeta Shree
- Awards: Ramnath Goenka Excellence in Journalism Awards in 2010

Ajit Anjum is an Indian journalist. He has worked as managing editor at News 24 and India TV news channels. He was awarded the Ramnath Goenka Excellence in Journalism Awards in 2010. He is known as a center-left journalist who is known for critical reporting of BJP.

== Early life ==
Anjum, named Ajit Kumar at birth, was born in the Begusarai district of Bihar. His father, Ramsagar Prasad Singh, was in the Bihar Judicial Services as a judge at Patna. Anjum had his early education at Begusarai and Darbhanga. He obtained his bachelor's degree from Langat Singh College, Muzaffarpur, affiliated to Bihar University.

Anjum started his career as a journalist while pursuing his studies at Muzaffarpur. He changed his last name from Kumar to Anjum while working as a local reporter at the Patliputra Times. Working as freelance journalist in Patna, he wrote for Dharmyug, Saptahik Hindustaan, Dinmaan and Ravivar. He went to Delhi in 1989 and started working at Amar Ujala.

== Career ==
In 1994, Anjum began his career in journalism by joining BAG Films as director of the talk show Rubaru hosted by the Congress leader Rajeev Shukla. He worked for fifteen years with BAG Films and produced many shows in that period. He then moved to Aaj Tak as a senior producer but did not stay there very long. He rejoined BAG Films and, as an employee of BAF, he spearheaded the launch of News 24 in 2007. While with News 24, he was awarded the Ramnath Goenka Award for his reporting of the flood in Bihar in 2010. Anjum managed a campaign on News 24 that resulted in truckloads of relief materials reaching the victims. As a result, Fem magazine mentioned him in its list of 50 most powerful people of Bihar in its survey conducted in 2016.

He left News 24 in 2014 and joined India TV as its managing editor, working under editor-in-chief Rajat Sharma. While Anjum was working at India TV, a senior correspondent of the same TV news channel, Imran Shaikh, accused Anjum of pressurising him to tweak news in favour of a political party. Anjum denied the charge through a Facebook post.

While working with Star News (Now ABP News), he conceptualised shows like Red Alert, Sansani and Bamboo mein Tamboo.

== Controversy ==
In 2013, 08 journalists, Ajit Anjum, Anchor Suhail, and reporter Sunil Dutt, who worked with News24 and editor-in-chief Deepak Chaurasia; anchors Tripathi and Rashid Hashmi; Jodhpur reporter Lalit Singh Badgurjar; and producer Abhinav Raj, who worked for India News, were charged with preparation of forged video of a minor girl, who was victim of sexual assault, and her family by showing them in an indecent manner and telecasting it on news channels.

They have accordingly been charged under sections 120B, 469, 471 IPC, sections 67B and 67 IT Act and sections 23 of POCSO Act.

The matter is presently being heard before Special POCSO Court in Gurugram, Haryana, where Charges have been framed against the accused.

== Awards ==
- Ramnath Goenka Excellence in Journalism Awards, 2010.
