= Deepali Pansare =

Indian television actress

- Born: July 3, 1984 (age 42); Nashik, Maharashtra, India
- Occupation: Actress
- Years active: 2008–present
- Known for: Neer Bhare Tere Naina Devi; Iss Pyaar Ko Kya Naam Doon?; Devyani; Aai Kuthe Kay Karte!
- Spouse: Suveer Safaya (m. 2014)
- Children: 1

Deepali Pansare is an Indian actress who primarily works in Hindi television and Hindi films. Pansare is known for portraying Suhaagi in Neer Bhare Tere Naina Devi, Payal Singh Raizada in Iss Pyaar Ko Kya Naam Doon?, Devyani Kelkar in Devyani and Sanjana Deshmukh in Aai Kuthe Kay Karte!.

== Personal life ==
Pansare married Suveer Safaya, a Kashmiri Pandit and banker on 10 February 2014. The couple have a son named Ruaan, who was born in 2017.

== Career ==
Pansare made her acting debut in 2008 with Hum Ladkiyan. She went onto portray supporting roles in shows such as Shakuntala, Dill Mill Gayye, Dhoondh Legi Manzil Humein, Devon Ke Dev...Mahadev, Dil Toh Happy Hai Ji and Ghum Hai Kisikey Pyaar Meiin.

She portrayed prominent character of Nooran in Lajwanti and Agent Gauri in Agent Raghav – Crime Branch. She also portrayed episodic roles in Adaalat, SuperCops vs Supervillains and Khidki.

Pansare is best known for her portrayal of Suhaagi in Neer Bhare Tere Naina Devi, Payal Singh Raizada in Iss Pyaar Ko Kya Naam Doon?, Devyani Kelkar in Devyani(her first lead role), Sanjana Deshmukh in Aai Kuthe Kay Karte! and Kamini Joshi in Chikoo Ki Mummy Durr Kei.

Pansare made her film debut with Marathi film Hello! Gandhe Sir (2010) and her Hindi film debut with Ek Thi Daayan (2013). She has been part of films including Sunoyona: The Beautiful Eyes (2015), Chalk n Duster (2016) and Fraud Saiyaan (2019).

Pansare portrayed Manju Shekhawat in Muskuraane Ki Vajah Tum Ho which went off air in 2022. She made her web debut with The Broken News in 2022.

== Filmography ==
=== Films ===
- All films are in Hindi unless otherwise noted.

Year	Title	Role	Notes	Ref.
2010	Hello! Gandhe Sir	Unknown	Marathi film	
2013	Ek Thi Daayan	Old Man's Nurse		
2015	Sunoyona: The Beautiful Eyes	Sunoyona	English short film	
2016	Chalk n Duster	Naresh Patel's daughter		
2019	Fraud Saiyaan	Sunita		
2025	Zapuk Zupuk	Vrunda Mohite		

=== Television ===
Year	Title	Role	Notes	Ref.
2008	Hum Ladkiyan	Unknown		
2009	Shakuntala	Rajkumari Gauri's friend		
2009	Dill Mill Gayye	Sumalatha Dalmiya	Season 1	
2010	Neer Bhare Tere Naina Devi	Suhaagi		
2010	Adaalat	Mubina Khatun		
2010–2011	Dhoondh Legi Manzil Humein	Nandini		
2011–2012	Iss Pyaar Ko Kya Naam Doon?	Payal Singh Raizada		
2012	SuperCops Vs Super Villains	Meenakshi	Episodic appearance	
2013	Devon Ke Dev...Mahadev	Tulsi		
2013–2014	Devyani	Devyani Kelkar Vikhe-Patil	Marathi series	
2015-2016	Agent Raghav – Crime Branch	Agent Gauri		
2016	Lajwanti	Nooran		
2016	Khidki	Shanti	Story: "Govinda Govinda"	
2019	Dil Toh Happy Hai Ji	Meenu		
2019–2020	Aai Kuthe Kay Karte!	Sanjana Deshmukh	Marathi series	
2021–2022	Chikoo Ki Mummy Durr Kei	Kamini Joshi		
2021	Ghum Hai Kisikey Pyaar Meiin	Barkha Rani Wagh		
2022	Muskuraane Ki Vajah Tum Ho	Manju Shekhawat		
2023	Pushpa Impossible	Vasundhara Raidhan		
2023–2025	Lakshmichya Paulanni	Rohini Chandekar	Marathi Series	
2024–2025	Jhanak	Mrinalini "Meenu" Ghosh		
2026–present	Tu Hi Re Dil Mein	Kavita Patel		

=== Web series ===
Year	Title	Role	Notes	Ref.
2022	The Broken News	Nazneen Balsara	1 season	
