= Chalk n Duster =

2016 Indian drama film on education system

- Theatrical release poster
- Directed by: Jayant Gilatar
- Written by: Ranjeev Verma; Neetu Verma
- Produced by: Amin Surani
- Starring: Shabana Azmi; Juhi Chawla; Zarina Wahab; Divya Dutta; Upasana Singh
- Cinematography: Baba Azmi
- Edited by: Santosh Mandal
- Music by: Sandesh Shandilya
- Production company: Surani Pictures
- Distributed by: SPE Films India
- Release date: 15 January 2016
- Running time: 130 minutes
- Country: India
- Language: Hindi

Chalk n Duster is a 2016 Indian social drama film about the commercialization of the Indian private education system, starring Shabana Azmi, Juhi Chawla, Zarina Wahab, Girish Karnad, and Divya Dutta. The film talks about teachers' and students' communication, and highlights the problem of teachers and students in an educational system which is changing day by day.

The film was directed by Jayant Gilatar, written by Ranjeev Verma and, Neetu Verma and produced by Amin Surani.

Upon release, the film received mixed reviews from critics. The Hindustan Times said, "It's a well told ethics versus greed story".

The film was made tax free in Delhi, Rajasthan, Uttar Pradesh and Bihar.

== Plot ==
Vidya is a senior staff member at an educational institution that has so far run smoothly under Principal Indu Shastry. Things change with the appointment of a new principal. Indu is replaced by Kamini, who wants to upgrade the middle-class school. Teachers' chairs are removed from the classrooms, free tea is stopped, and class subjects are redistributed among the teachers, which affects how the school functions.

All of this is too much for the good-hearted Vidya, who suffers a heart attack after a sudden and unfair dismissal. In solidarity, her friend and colleague Jyoti decides to take on Kamini and the misdirected board of trustees, led by Anmol. This entails using a TV channel as a platform to remind viewers that teachers need support, recognition, and more pay.

The drama ends with a recovered Vidya and Jyoti taking on a Who Wants to Be A Millionaire-style quiz to win 5 crore rupees. The trade-off is that if they lose, they will have to accept their termination and leave their professions. Vidya and Jyoti use their talents to win the quiz battle. Unwillingly, the trustee, Anmol, signs a bank cheque for 5 crore rupees and apologizes to Vidya and Jyoti publicly on the TV show. In the end, Vidya reveals that she will be handing over the money to former principal Indu to build a school where no teacher will be discriminated against and students will receive a good education for a lower cost.

== Cast ==
- Shabana Azmi as Vidya Sawant
- Juhi Chawla as Jyoti Thakur
- Divya Dutta as Kamini Gupta, Principal of Kantaben High School
- Upasna Singh as Manjeet
- Girish Karnad as Manohar Sawant
- Zarina Wahab as Indu Shastry
- Sameer Soni as Sunil Thakur, Jyoti's Husband
- Jackie Shroff as Naresh Patel, Principal of DGM School
- Aarya Babbar as Anmol Parekh, Kantaben High School's Trustee
- Richa Chaddha as Bhairavi Thakkar, News Reporter
- Gavie Chahal as IAS officer
- Deepali Pansare as Naresh Patel's daughter
- Adi Irani
- Rishi Kapoor as Host Of The Quiz Contest (Special Appearance)
- Salman Shaikh as Deepak Rajgaur
- Karan Singh Chhabra
- Kabir Arora
- Akshita Arora
- Naveen Sharma
- Ranjeev verma
- Neetu verma
- Yug
- Jasbir Thandi

== Soundtrack ==
No.	Title	Singer(s)	Length
1.	"Aye Zindagi"	Sonu Nigam
2.	"Deep Shiksha"	Alka Yagnik
3.	"Jingle Bodmas"	Shabana Azmi

== Reception ==
According to Meena Iyer of Times of India Chalk N Duster has its heart in the right place. Made with an intention of showcasing the worms in the current education system, this film can be lauded to some degree - and gave it a 2.5/5 rating.
