= Hello! Gandhe Sir =

- Theatrical release poster
- Directed by: Arun Karnataki
- Produced by: Sandeep – Sameer
- Starring: Bharat Jadhav; Dr. Girish Oak
- Music by: Pravin Kuvar
- Release date: 19 June 2009
- Country: India
- Language: Marathi

Hello! Gandhe Sir is a Marathi movie released on 19 June 2009. Produced by Dnyaeshwar Govekar and directed by the duo, Sandeep – Sameer.

== Cast ==
The cast includes

- Bharat Jadhav as Gangya
- Girish Oak as Mr. Gandhe & Others
- Deepali Pansare

== Soundtrack ==
The music has been provided by Pravin Kuvar.

=== Track listing ===
No.	Title	Length
1.	"Hello Gandhe Sir"	6:07
2.	"Mala kombadichi"	2:46
