= Deepak Chaurasia =

Indian journalist

- Born: 28 December 1968 (age 57)
- Education: IIMC
- Occupation: Anchor
- Children: 1

Deepak Chaurasia (born 1968) is an Indian journalist and Hindi-language news anchor for Zee News.

Chaurasia was a contestant on the reality TV show, Bigg Boss OTT Season 3. He entered the show on June 21, 2024 and got evicted after 30 days. The series is streamed on JioCinema Premium.

== Early life ==
Deepak Chaurasia received his diploma in journalism from the Indian Institute of Mass Communication, New Delhi.

== Career ==
After completing his education, Deepak cofounded Aaj Tak. In 2003 he joined DD News as a consulting editor. He returned to Aaj Tak in July 2004. He later joined STAR News which became ABP News. Deepak joined India News in the capacity of editor-in-chief in January 2013.

He left India News & News Nation and joined Zee News.

== Controversies ==
In November 2013, a Media Sarkar sting operation aired allegedly showing several leaders of the Aam Aadmi Party agreeing to assist in land deals and other financial arrangements in return for cash donations. The party responded by calling the footage fabricated, a violation of the Model Code of Conduct and threatening to sue Media Sarkar and any TV channels that aired the video. Chaurasia was thereafter sued for defamation by the party national secretary, who alleged that the sting operation was faked to harm the party's reputation.

In August 2013, the Delhi Sikh Gurdwara Management Committee filed charges against India News for repeatedly airing an interview with a spokesman for Asaram Bapu which allegedly contained factually incorrect statements about a series of sexual assault allegations against him. In December 2013, criminal charges were also brought against Chaurasia alleging that he had personally tampered with documents related to the sexual assault allegations. In January 2014, the Allahabad high court stayed his arrest following his response that the broadcast was "bona fide" and nothing was tampered with.

=== Controversial Show ===
Chaurasia was seen slurring his words and making several verbal slips while anchoring a live show about the death of General Bipin Rawat in a helicopter crash. Chaurasia mistakenly described the general as a “journalist”, and at one point referred to him as “General V.P. Singh”. Chaurasia faced wide-ranging criticism on social media for his on-air demeanor and was accused of being drunk while on air. He later issued a statement on Facebook denying that he was inebriated during the show. He claimed that he was suffering side-effects after having consumed a large quantity of painkillers to alleviate pain from a hairline fracture in his leg.

=== Gurgaon POCSO Case ===
In 2013, 08 journalists, editor-in-chief Deepak Chaurasia; anchors Tripathi and Rashid Hashmi; Jodhpur reporter Lalit Singh Badgurjar; and producer Abhinav Raj, who worked for India News and Ajit Anjum, Anchor Suhail, and reporter Sunil Dutt, who worked with News24, were charged with preparation of forged video of a minor girl, who was victim of sexual assault, and her family by showing them in an indecent manner and telecasting it on news channels.

They have accordingly been charged under sections 120B, 469, 471 IPC, sections 67B and 67 IT Act and sections 23 of POCSO Act.

The matter is presently being heard before Special POCSO Court in Gurugram, Haryana, where Charges have been framed against the accused.
