= Nuvvu Nenu Prema =

Indian Telugu drama television series

- Genre: Drama; Romance
- Written by: Narendra Kumar Yenuganti
- Story by: Praja Prabhakar
- Directed by: Sanjeev Reddy Lingala
- Starring: Swaminathan Anantharaman; Pavithra B.Naik
- No. of episodes: 777

Production
- Producers: Poluru Srikanth; Bollareddy Manish Reddy
- Cinematography: Saravanan
- Editors: Dhanishtha, Shiva Sai
- Running time: 22 minutes

Original release
- Network: Star Maa
- Release: 16 May 2022 – 11 November 2024

Related
- Iss Pyaar Ko Kya Naam Doon?

Nuvvu Nenu Prema (transl. You, Me and Love) is an Indian Telugu-language romantic drama television series that premiered on 16 May 2022 and ended on 11 November 2024 with 777 episodes on Star Maa. It is an official remake of StarPlus's television series Iss Pyaar Ko Kya Naam Doon?. It stars Swaminathan Anantharaman and Pavithra B. Naik. The story revolves around short-tempered businessman Vikramaditya and self-respecting middle-class woman Padmavathi when they cross paths.

== Plot ==
Vikramaditya, Vicky is a young short-tempered arrogant business magnate with a sour past who running manufacture of modern dresses. He believes money is everything. He encounters an entirely opposite girl Padmavati, who believes in emotions and who lives in Tirupati and a heartful devotee of Tirupati Venkateshwara Swami.

Things goes wrong when Padmavati's sister Anuradha, Anu's in laws demand for dowry and Padmavati try to inform this to Anu's fiancée. She by mislead to the stage were Vicky arranged a his new establishment launch. Vicky locks Padmavati and behaves rudely with her because he thinks she is deliberately disrupting his show. And it leads to called off Anu's wedding. An angry Vicky leaks the video were Padmavati falling to him leads them to follow their paternal aunt to Vizag. Murli Krishna save Padmavati from eve teasers.

In a rush to help her aunt Padmavati bumps into Vicky's car and accept to pay for the damage. She goes on to sell sarees to pay for Vicky's broken car, and she ends up at his house by mistake. Meanwhile, Arya fall for Anu. Padmavati meets Vicky's 's sister, Aravindha, and their maternal grandmother, Shanthadevi. Both of them take an instant liking to the lively and cheerful Padmavati as she reminds them of their hometown Tirupati. She successfully sells her sarees and gets an even bigger order from them, only to be falsely framed by Vicky's aunt, Kuchala, to have sold torn sarees. Thus, she loses the order and finds herself unable to gather the money to pay Vicky for the car damage.

Back at her aunt's, Murali, who is Aravindha's husband, reaches Padmavati's place as a bachelor wanting to get marry Padmavati. Padmavati asks Murali to help her get a job, and thus she reaches VA office. Padmavati's clumsiness irritates Vicky, so he does not want her in his office. Padmavati, not wanting to give up, taunts Vicky, and eventually, they sign a 15-day contract, which says if she quits before the end of the contract period, Padmavati would have to pay Vicky one lakh rupees. Padmavati takes up the challenge only to find Vicky going out of his way to make her quit the job somehow. He makes her miserable by assigning her humanely impossible tasks, but Padmavati does them all in stride. In a particularly life-threatening situation, Vicky rescues Padmavati and briefly regrets putting her in that predicament. Tired of these antics, Anu convinces Padmavati to quit the job, and the two sisters decide to go back to Tirupati.

Aravindha request Padmavati to join them on Gowri Pooja and so she is. Then reveals that Murli is husband of Aravindha. An unexpected meeting with Vicky, Padmavati decided to leave Vizag. But their parents were in debts. So an inspiration hits Padmavati, who believes that it is a sign from the god she had strong faith in. They decide to stay and open a new business and as luck would have it, Meanwhile, Arya feel joyful as Anu does not leave. Murali convinces Shanthadevi for Vicky and Maya's relationship even though Vicky were saying "she is my friend". With the help of Prem Singh Padmavati start new catering business. But hurdles face when a pervert misbehave with Padmavati. However Vicky help her out.

As this plain fail she take away food to the corporate companies, but still no use. At last they end up at the Vikramaditya's house to full fill an order for Aravindha and Murali's wedding anniversary celebrations. Hesitated by Granny's words Maya and Kuchala plot against Padmavati by destroying the food. Her sportive act impresses everyone and clean her out. Elsewhere Murali hide when he spot Padmavati and Aravindha cut her wedding cake lonely. Murali manipulate his absents.

Aravindha requests for Padmavati to train Maya to become like her to make Maya as Vicky's wife. As Bhaktha had a heart attack and for treatments Padmavati accept it. Murali was the cause for the paralysis that occurred to him. Meanwhile, Murali try to win Padmavati's family to pursue her. Maaya started to change like Padmavati to win Granny's heart. But as time flew by, Vicky was not that much attached to Maya but was towards Padmavathi by seeing her love and caring towards him and his family.

Vicky eventually proposes to Padmavathi about his love but she rejects him fearing what new problems will happen between their two families since that was the moment Anu and Arya's love was approved and Padmavathi did not want to affect that. Also, she was engaged to Murali too at that time due to her family requesting her to marry him for her father's health's sake. She maintained distance, wanted Maya and Vicky's marriage to happen, and did not want anyone's happiness spoiled by her. Eventually one day during Murali and Aravinda's Santana Salphaya Vratham, Padmavathi knew the true shades of Krishna (Murali) and immediately broke their engagement.

== Cast ==
=== Main ===
- Swaminathan Anantharaman as Vikramaditya (Vicky)
- Pavithra B Naik as Padmavathi

=== Recurring ===
- Madhubala Vijaykumar as Aravindha
- Maneesh Reddy as Murali Krishna
- Navya Douala as Anuradha
- Vahini K as Andalu
- Yashwanth as Arya
- Raja Sridhar as Bhakta
- Poojitha as Kuchala
- Chinna as Narayana
- Usha Sri as Shantha Devi
- Naveena as Jalaja
- Vanitha as Parvathi
