= Aabhaas Mehta =

Indian film and television actor

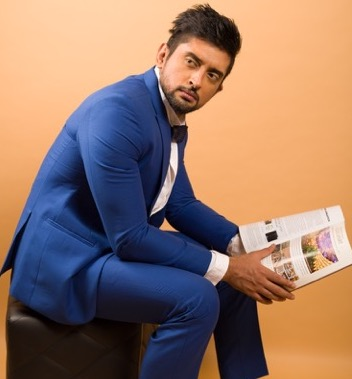
- Occupation: Actor
- Spouse: Zeenia Wadia (m. 2023)

Aabhaas Mehta is an Indian actor. He started his acting career in 2009 with Bairi Piya that aired on Colors TV. He played the role of Suren. He rose to fame with his performance as Shyam Jha in Star Plus' Iss Pyaar Ko Kya Naam Doon. He also played Raghvendra Barot in Sony Entertainment Television's Hum Rahein Na Rahein Hum in 2023.

== Personal life ==
Mehta studied law in Pune. He acted in a few short films before he made his debut on TV. Mehta also did an acting course from Anupam Kher's The School of Actors before he got his first show in 2009.

Mehta married his long time girlfriend, communications professional Zeenia Wadia on 1 October 2023.

== Career ==
Mehta began his career with Bairi Piya in 2009 on Colors TV. He went on to perform roles in shows like Devi (2010 on Imagine), Na Aana Is Des Laado (2011 on Colors), as Shyam Jha in Iss Pyaar Ko Kya Naam Doon (2011 on Star Plus), as Agasthya in Badalte Rishton Ki Dastaan (2013 on Zee TV), as Betaal in Sinhasan Battisti (2015), and as Yug Shrivastava in Brahmarakshas (2016 on Zee TV). He played the character of Shumbh in Mahakali– Anth hi Aarambh hai (on Colors). Aabhaas, also played the role of Dr. Parag in Tu Sooraj Main Saanjh Piyaji (Star Plus). Since 2023, Mehta also played Raghvendra Barot in Hum Rahein Na Rahein Hum on Sony Entertainment Television. Recently, he essayed the character of Hiranyakashyap in Lakshmi Narayan – Sukh Samarthya Santulan on Colors TV. His latest web series Flight Attendant is also streaming on Hungama TV

== Television and web series ==
Year	Title	Role
2009	Bairi Piya	Suren
2010	Devi	Pranay
2011	Na Aana Is Des Laado	
2011–2012	Iss Pyaar Ko Kya Naam Doon?	Shyam Jha
2013	Badalte Rishton Ki Dastaan	Agasthya Kailash Asthana
2014	Devon Ke Dev...Mahadev	Adi
2015	Sinhasan Battisi	Betaal
2016	Brahmarakshas	Yug Shrivastava
2017–2018	Mahakali– Anth hi Aarambh hai	Shumbha
2018	Tu Sooraj, Main Saanjh Piyaji	Dr Parag Bansal
2019	Laal Ishq	Rishabh
2022	Tera Chhalaava	Sharan
2023	Hum Rahein Na Rahein Hum	Raghvendra Barot
2023	Mauka Ya Dhokha	Satyajeet Singh
2024	Lakshmi Narayan – Sukh Samarthya Santulan	Jay / Hiranyakashyap
2024	Flight Attendant	Mahinder
2026	Zung-The Rust	
2026	Hastinapur Ke Veer	Jarasandha

== Commercial diver ==
In 2015, Aabhaas joined a commercial diving course in Scotland. He is a certified commercial air diver.
