= Sana Makbul =

Indian television actress (born 1993)

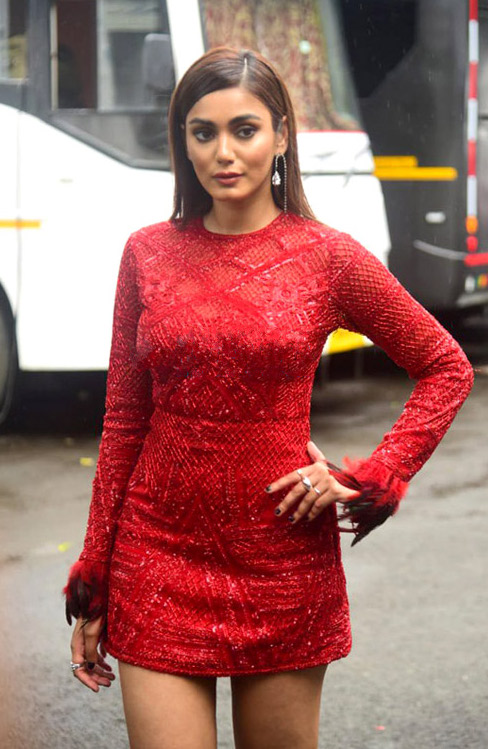
- Makbul in 2021
- Born: Sana Makbul Khan; 13 June 1993 (age 33); Mumbai, Maharashtra, India
- Occupations: Actress, model
- Years active: 2009-present
- Known for: Iss Pyaar Ko Kya Naam Doon? Vish; Fear Factor: Khatron Ke Khiladi 11; Bigg Boss OTT Season 3

Sana Makbul Khan (born 13 June 1993) is an Indian model and actress who mainly works in Hindi television along with Telugu films and Tamil Films. She is best known for her roles as Lavanya Kashyap in StarPlus romantic daily soap Iss Pyaar Ko Kya Naam Doon? and Dr. Aliya Kothari (née Sanyal) in Colors TV supernatural drama Vish. Makbul khan made her film debut in 2014 with the Telugu film Dikkulu Choodaku Ramayya. In 2021, she participated in the stunt-based show Fear Factor: Khatron Ke Khiladi 11, and emerged as a semifinalist. In 2024, she participated in Bigg Boss OTT Season 3, and emerged as the winner of the season.

== Early life ==
Sana Khan (later Makbul) was born on 13 June 1993 in Bombay, Maharashtra. She completed her schooling from Mumbai Public School, and she pursued graduation from R. D. National College in Mumbai, Maharashtra, where she developed an interest in modeling and acting. Her mother is a Malayali from Kerala and father from Mumbai.

== Personal life ==
In 2022, she posted on her official Instagram account that she had undergone surgery following a dog bite to her face.

== Career ==
Makbul began her career in modeling, which led to opportunities in advertisements and TV shows. Her first significant television appearance came in 2009 with the reality show MTV Scooty Teen Diva.

Her film career began in 2014 with the Telugu movie Dikkulu Choodaku Ramayya for which she adopted the screen name Sana Makbul. In this debut film, she played Samhitha, an aerobics trainer caught in a love triangle with a father and son. She then signed on for the Tamil crime thriller Rangoon directed by Rajkumar Periasamy, expanding her presence in the South Indian film industry. In 2019, she worked alongside Vishal Vishishtha in the show Vish in Colors TV.

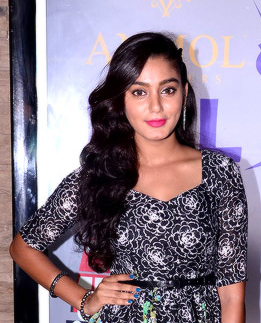
Makbul at Box Cricket League (Season 1) 2014

In 2021, she made her reality TV debut through participation in Colors TV's popular stunt-based show Fear Factor: Khatron Ke Khiladi 11 filmed in Cape Town, South Africa, where she emerged as a semi-finalist.

In June 2024, Makbul entered as a contestant in the third season of Bigg Boss OTT, the Indian version of the reality TV show Big Brother. She stayed in the house for six weeks and emerged as the winner of Bigg Boss OTT 3.

== Filmography ==
=== Films ===
Key
†	Denotes films that have not yet been released

Year	Title	Role	Language	Notes	Ref.
2014	Dikkulu Choodaku Ramayya	Samhitha	Telugu		
2017	Rangoon	Natasha	Tamil		
2017	Mama O Chandamama	Keerthi	Telugu		
TBA	Kadhal Conditions Apply †	TBA	Tamil	Completed	
TBA	Nemesis †	TBA	Hindi	Delayed	

=== Television ===
Year	Title	Role	Notes	Ref.
2010-2011	Ishaan: Sapno Ko Awaaz De	Sara		
2010-2011	Kitani Mohabbat Hai 2	Shefali		
2011–2012	Iss Pyaar Ko Kya Naam Doon?	Lavanya Kashyap		
2012-2014	Arjun	Riya Mukherjee		
2014-2015	Box Cricket League 1	Contestant	Mumbai Warriors	
2016	Box Cricket League 2	Contestant	Chennai Swaggers	
2017–2018	Aadat Se Majboor	Riya Tootejaa		
2019	Vish	Dr. Aliya Sanyal		
2019	Khatra Khatra Khatra	Contestant	Episode 66	
2021	Fear Factor: Khatron Ke Khiladi 11	Contestant	Semi-Finalist	
2022	Bhabhi Ke Pyaare Pritam Hamare	Guest	Episode 21	
2024	Bigg Boss OTT 3	Contestant	Winner	
2025	Bruh (season 1)	Sejal	Webseries	
2026	Begum Of Crime	Divya Sharma	Webseries	

=== Music videos ===
Year	Title	Singer(s)	Ref.
2019	Khelegi Kya?	Gajendra Verma	
2019	Psycho	Dev Negi	
2020	Gallan	Ishaan Khan	
2022	Ek Tu Hi Toh Hai	Stebin Ben	
2024	Kaala Maal	Rohanpreet Singh, Gurlez Akhtar	
2024	Kehna Galat Galat	Jyoti Nooran, Javed–Mohsin	
2024	Saadhni	Afsana Khan	
2025	Bhamai	Naezy	
2025	Tu Saath Hai Toh	Vishal Mishra	
2025	Koi Koi Karda	Stebin Ben	
2025	Jee Kare Dekhta Rahoon	Sameer Khan	
