= Iss Pyaar Ko Kya Naam Doon? =

Indian romantic drama television series

- Genre: Drama; Romantic comedy
- Directed by: Nissar Parvez; Maan Singh; Arshad Khan; Lalit Mohan
- Creative directors: Madhura Rapsang; Megha S. Kumar; Shivangi V Chauhan Babbar; Richa Singh Gautam
- Starring: Barun Sobti; Sanaya Irani
- Theme music composer: Raju Singh
- Opening theme: "Iss Pyaar Ko Kya Naam Doon?" By Sadhana Sargam and Javed Ali
- Ending theme: Rabba Ve
- Country of origin: India
- Original language: Hindi
- No. of seasons: 3
- No. of episodes: 398

Production
- Producers: Gul Khan; Nissar Parvez; Rajesh Chadha
- Cinematography: Hrishikesh Gandhi
- Camera setup: Multi-camera
- Running time: 20 minutes
- Production company: 4 Lions Films

Original release
- Network: StarPlus
- Release: 6 June 2011 – 30 November 2012

Related
- Iss Pyaar Ko Kya Naam Doon? Ek Baar Phir; Iss Pyaar Ko Kya Naam Doon 3

Iss Pyaar Ko Kya Naam Doon? (transl. What Shall We Name This Love?) is an Indian Hindi-language romantic drama television series that aired on StarPlus from 6 June 2011 to 30 November 2012. Produced by Gul Khan under 4 Lions Films, it starred Barun Sobti and Sanaya Irani.

On 24 November 2015, Hotstar launched an eight episode web series, Iss Pyaar Ko Kya Naam Doon? – Ek Jashan, to extend the Iss Pyaar Ko Kya Naam Doon? storyline. Barun Sobti and Sanaya Irani reprised their respective roles as Arnav and Khushi.

== Plot ==
Arnav Singh Raizada is an arrogant and successful business tycoon from Delhi who is haunted by the death of his parents 14 years ago. He crosses paths with Khushi Kumari Gupta, a spirited girl from a humble background in Lucknow. Their worlds collide when Khushi accidentally disrupts one of his fashion events. Arnav mistakes her for a corporate spy and misbehaves with her, and the chaos causes Khushi's sister Payal's wedding to be called off. After another argument between Arnav and Khushi, Arnav releases the tapes of the fashion show to the media, ruining Khushi's reputation. Khushi is harassed on the streets and saved by Shyam Manohar Jha, a seemingly nice man who is married to Arnav's sister Anjali.

Reeling from disgrace and humiliation, Khushi and Payal are sent to Delhi to live with their paternal aunt Madhumati. In Delhi, fate ensures another run-in with Arnav when Khushi damages his car. Determined to repay him, she ends up at the Raizada mansion, Shantivan, to sell sarees. There, she charms Arnav's kind-hearted sister, Anjali and their grandmother, Devyani, who take an instant liking to her. However, her plans are thwarted by Arnav's aunt Manorama, who falsely accuses her of selling torn sarees, costing Khushi her payment.

Meanwhile, Shyam reappears in Khushi's life under the pretense of being single and charms Madhumati, who offers him to stay in their house as a paying-guest. Khushi seeks Shyam's help to find her a job - he gets her a role at Arnav's office, where Khushi ends up being hired as the assistant of Arnav's girlfirend Lavanya. Arnav is furious when he finds out that Khushi is employed in his office and tries to push Khushi out by giving her difficult and uncomfortable tasks, but Khushi, determined and resilient, completes every challenge he throws her way.

One day, Arnav unknowingly sends Khushi to a guesthouse that was near collapsing - although he saves her, Khushi insults him for putting her life in danger and resigns from her job. She declares she's leaving for Lucknow. However, a sign from her beloved Devi Maiyya convinces Khushi to stay back in Delhi and start a sweet shop. Coincidentally, their first big order takes her straight back to the Raizada house for Anjali's anniversary celebrations.

Khushi is later hired by Anjali to groom Arnav's girlfriend, Lavanya, into the ideal daughter-in-law. Constant interactions spark a slow transformation in Arnav. Though he starts out insulting Khushi repeatedly, he finds himself falling for her. Khushi, too, begins to see other sides of him and starts to develop feelings for him.

Meanwhile, Khushi's adoptive father, Shashi, discovers Shyam's secret. To stop Shashi from exposing him, Shyam causes Shashi to suffer a paralyzing stroke and Shashi ends up wheelchair-bound. Shyam uses the opportunity to manipulate Madhumati into fixing his and Khushi's wedding, but Khushi refuses, citing that she never saw Shyam in that light.

Arnav and Khushi's growing closeness culminates during Diwali where they almost kiss, but Arnav, horrified at his loss of control and fearing vulnerability, announces his marriage with Lavanya instead. A heartbroken Khushi agrees to marry Shyam. When Arnav learns of Khushi's engagement, jealousy and anger resurface. Meanwhile, Arnav's cousin, Akash, falls in love with Payal, causing Arnav and Khushi to form a truce - they bring Akash and Payal together and convince their respective families of the match. The wedding preparations begin.

Eventually, Khushi learns the truth about Shyam and ends the engagement. Fearing that the revelation might ruin Payal and Akash's wedding and break Anjali's heart, she stays silent. Arnav, having finally realized that he is cheating Lavanya, breaks things off with her. Arnav's cousin Nandkishore (nicknamed NK) arrives from Sydney and causes some jealousy in Arnav due to his easy friendship with Khushi.

As the wedding rituals progress, Arnav and Khushi grow closer and closer. On the day of Akash and Payal's wedding, Arnav is ready to declare his feelings for Khushi - however, things go horribly wrong when he comes across Shyam forcibly embracing Khushi and declaring his love to her, interpreting it as them having an affair - something which Shyam confirms to Arnav when Arnav confronts him. A heartbroken Arnav tries to tell Anjali the truth - however, on learning that Anjali is pregnant, he changes his mind. To protect Anjali, Arnav forces Khushi into a six-month contract marriage, using Akash and Payal's marriage to blackmail her.

Their pretend marriage is fraught with tension and underlying affection. Arnav tries his best to hate her and mistrusts her intentions whereas a heartbroken Khushi struggles to understand his motives. The truth of their marriage is only revealed to Khushi one day when she nearly commits suicide due to a misunderstanding which Arnav clears. Khushi tells Arnav the truth of what happened between her and Shyam, but he refuses to believe her and prepares to attend a conference in London.

When Shyam realizes that Arnav changed his will to exclude him, he orchestrates Arnav's kidnapping to claim the Raizada fortune. Arnav's family assumes he is in London, but Khushi eventually realizes the truth, and, with the help of NK and Manorama, rescues Arnav. Upon returning, Khushi exposes Shyam to the Raizadas - however, he denies all her claims and accuses Khushi of coming onto him. Arnav throws Shyam out of the house and declares that he believes Khushi, which sends Anjali into depression and causes a period of great tension in Shantivan.

Arnav and Anjali's paternal grandmother, Subhadra Devi, arrives, disapproving of Khushi and determined to restore Shyam's position in the family. She reveals to both the families that Arnav and Khushi's wedding was religiously invalid as they had not completed all the necessary rituals; Arnav decides to marry Khushi again with all the proper rituals. Meanwhile, Shyam causes Anjali to suffer a miscarriage, and her dwindling health leads Khushi to bring Shyam back into Shantivan for her recovery.

On the day of Arnav and Khushi's wedding, Subhadra Devi tries to sabotage it by revealing a painful secret from the past - Khushi's adoptive mother, Garima, had an affair with Arnav's father, unaware that he was married, which led to the suicide of Arnav's mother and then his father on the day of Anjali's wedding. Arnav, devastated, remembers his mother's words about not hurting the ones you love for mistakes they didn't commit and ultimately chooses love over hate. He marries Khushi, telling everyone that he does not blame Garima and wants to move on from his past.

On their wedding night, Arnav and Khushi discover hidden cameras in their room, planted by Shyam. They uncover more of his misdeeds, including his role in Anjali's miscarriage, and expose him completely. Anjali, finally seeing the truth, throws Shyam out for good.

Just as peace returns, Arnav's ex-girlfriend from college, Sheetal, arrives with a boy named Aarav, pretending he is Arnav's son to scam the family. Though she is initially successful in deceiving Khushi, Arnav eventually exposes her plot, and later he and Khushi decide to adopt Aarav. To establish her identity beyond being Arnav's wife, Khushi enters a beauty pageant, which she wins with support from Arnav and the family.

== Cast ==
=== Main ===
- Barun Sobti as Arnav "ASR" Singh Raizada né Malik : Ratna and Arvind's son; Anjali's brother; Khushi's husband; Aarav's adoptive father (2011–2012)
- Sanaya Irani as Khushi Kumari Gupta Singh Raizada: Tej's daughter; Shashi and Garima's niece and adoptive daughter; Payal's cousin and adoptive sister; Arnav's wife; Aarav's adoptive mother (2011-2012)

=== Recurring ===
- Dalljiet Kaur as Anjali Shyam Jha (née Singh Raizada): Ratna and Arvind's daughter; Arnav's sister; Shyam's ex-wife
- Abhaas Mehta as Shyam Jha: Anjali's ex-husband; Khushi's ex-fiancé (2011–2012)
- Deepali Pansare as Payal Singh Raizada: Shashi and Sandhya's daughter; Garima's step-daughter; Khushi's adoptive sister; Akash's wife (2011–2012)
- Akshay Dogra as Akash Singh Raizada: Manorama and Mahendra's son; Payal's husband (2011–2012)
- Utkarsha Naik as Manorama Singh Raizada: Mahendra's wife; Akash's mother (2011–2012)
- Sanjay Batra as Shashi Gupta: Madhumati's brother; Sandhya and Garima's husband; Payal's father; Khushi's uncle and adoptive father (2011–2012)
- Tuhina Vohra/Pyumori Mehta Ghosh as Garima Gupta: Sandhya and Tej's sister; Shashi's second wife; Payal's step-mother; Khushi's aunt and adoptive mother (2011–2012)
- Abha Parmar as Madhumati Gupta: Shashi's sister (2011–2012)
- Jayshree T. as Devyani Raizada: Ratna and Mahendra's mother; Subhadra's childhood friend; Anjali, Arnav and Akash's grandmother (2011–2012)
- Rajesh Jais as Mahendra Singh Raizada: Devyani's son; Ratna's brother; Manorama's husband; Akash's father (2011–2012)
- Karan Godhwani as Nandkishore "NK" Mittal: Manorama's nephew; Arnav's cousin (2011–2012)
- Vishesh Bansal as Aarav Singh Raizada: Arnav and Khushi's adopted son (2012)
- Swati Chitnis as Subhadra Malik: Devyani's childhood friend; Anjali and Arnav's grandmother (2012)
- Dinesh Nag as Hari Prakash "HP" Yadav (2011)
- Sana Makbul as Lavanya Kashyap: Arnav's ex-fiancée (2011)
- Roshni Rastogi as Preetika "Preeto" (2011)
- Zuber K. Khan as Rahim Mirza (2011)
- Amit Dua as Vikrant Goel: Co-organizer of the Ms. India contest (2012)
- Ahmad Harhash as Ahill Raza Ibrahim (2011-2012)
- Gaurav Muskesh as Reporter
- Yogesh Tripathi as Kamlesh Khabari (2011)
- Dhriti Bhatia as Bubbly (2012)
- Madhura Naik as Sheetal Kapoor (2012)

=== Guest appearances ===
- Hanif Hilal as Guest (Dance performance to Character Dheela for Anjali-Shyam's anniversary) (2011)
- Nicole Alvares as Guest (Dance performance to Character Dheela for Anjali-Shyam's anniversary) (2011)
- Anas Rashid as Sooraj Rathi from Diya Aur Baati Hum (2012)
- Deepika Singh Goyal as Sandhya Rathi from Diya Aur Baati Hum (2012)
- Karan Tacker as Viren from Ek Hazaaron Mein Meri Behna Hai (2012)
- Kushal Tandon as Virat from Ek Hazaaron Mein Meri Behna Hai (2012)
- Krystle D'Souza as Jeevika from Ek Hazaaron Mein Meri Behna Hai (2012)
- Nia Sharma as Manvi from Ek Hazaaron Mein Meri Behna Hai (2012)
- Karan Mehra as Naitik from Yeh Rishta Kya Kehlata Hai (2012)
- Hina Khan as Akshara from Yeh Rishta Kya Kehlata Hai (2012)
- Arhaan Behll as Krishna from Mann Kee Awaaz Pratigya (2012)
- Pooja Gor as Pratigya from Mann Kee Awaaz Pratigya (2012)

== Production ==
=== Casting ===
The show was produced and directed by Gul Khan under the banner of 4 Lions Films. Barun Sobti was cast as Arnav Singh Raizada after the original choice, Karan Singh Grover, opted out of the role to focus on his film career and Sanaya Irani replaced Shraddha Arya who had originally been cast as the female lead. Dalljiet Kaur, Deepali Pansare & Akshay Dogra were finalized to play supporting roles to the main leads. Other supporting cast include Jayshree T., Tuhina Vohra, Abha Parmar, Utkarsha Naik, Sanjay Batra and many other actors. Abhaas Mehta and Sana Makbul entered the show as antagonists of the show. Sana later quit the show in December 2011.

== Reception ==
In week 15 to 21 of 2011, it entered the top ten Hindi GEC list, garnering a 2.6 TVR and occupying ninth position. As the series progressed, its viewership grew, eventually reaching a peak rating of 4.9 TVR, and it consistently featured in the top ten most-watched Hindi GEC programs during its original run.

Domestically, Iss Pyaar Ko Kya Naam Doon? was dubbed into several regional languages, including in Tamil as Idhu Kadhala, Telugu as Chuppulu Kalisina Shubhavela, and Malayalam as Mounam Sammadham. It was also officially remade in Bengali as Bojhena Se Bojhena on Star Jalsha. Internationally, the series was distributed to over 50 countries and dubbed into languages including Arabic (Men Nazra Thanya), Spanish (Duele Amar), and Russian (Kak Nazvat Etu Lyubov?). In Jamaica, it aired as Strange Love and became a regular feature of daytime programming. In Turkey, the dubbed version (Bir Garip Aşk) on Kanal 7 quadrupled the channel’s average ratings in its time slot, leading the network to shift the show to a prime-time position. The reception in Turkey was further noted during lead actor Barun Sobti’s 2016 visit to Istanbul, where he was greeted with fanfare.

== Awards and nominations ==
Year	Award	Category	Nominee	Result
2012	Gold Awards	Face of the Year	Sanaya Irani	Won
2012	Indian Television Academy Awards	Best Actor (Popular)	Barun Sobti	Won
2012	Indian Television Academy Awards	Best Actress (Popular)	Sanaya Irani	Nominated
2012	Indian Telly Awards	Best Actor in Negative Role	Abhaas Mehta	Nominated
2012	Indian Telly Awards	Personality of the Year	Barun Sobti	Nominated
2012	Indian Telly Awards	Best on Screen Couple	Barun Sobti & Sanaya Irani	Won
2012	People's Choice Awards India	Favorite Actor (Drama)	Barun Sobti	Won
2012	People's Choice Awards India	Favorite on Screen Jodi	Barun Sobti and Sanaya Irani	Won
2013	Indian Telly Awards	Best Actor	Barun Sobti	Nominated
2013	Indian Telly Awards	Best Actress	Sanaya Irani	Nominated
2013	Indian Telly Awards	Best Actor in a Negative Role	Abhaas Mehta	Nominated
2013	Indian Telly Awards	Best Actress in a Comic Role (Jury)	Utkarsha Naik	Nominated

== Spinoff ==
In 2015, Hotstar launched a web series of eight episodes titled Iss Pyaar Ko Kya Naam Doon? - Ek Jashn with the original cast and the characters. The story revolves around Arnav and Khushi's married life after three years.

== See also ==
- Bojhena Se Bojhena
- Nuvvu Nenu Prema
- Nee Naan Kaadhal
- Etho Janma Kalpanayil
