= Vish (TV series) =

Indian television series

- Also known as: Vish: A Poisonous Story
- Genre: Supernatural; Revenge; Drama; Mystery; Thriller
- Created by: Alind Srivastava; Nissar Parvej
- Starring: See below
- Opening theme: Vishnu
- Country of origin: India
- Original language: Hindi
- No. of seasons: 1
- No. of episodes: 80

Production
- Producers: Alind Srivastava; Nissar Parvej
- Production location: Mumbai Maharashtra India
- Camera setup: Multi-camera
- Running time: 22 minutes
- Production company: Peninsula Productions Limited

Original release
- Network: Colors TV
- Release: 10 June – 27 September 2019

Vish (also known as Vish – A Poisonous Story) is an Indian supernatural drama broadcast on Colors TV and digitally streamed on Voot. It aired from 10 June to 27 September 2019. It was produced under the banner of Peninsula Pictures. It starred Debina Bonnerjee, Sana Makbul and Vishal Vashishtha.

== Plot ==
Vishaili and Vishaila's lifespan extends into thousands of years experiencing astral projection as the poison within them reaches alarming levels. While Vishaili accomplishes Sabrina's body and comes into her full powers to live her life as a mortal, Vishaila's body alteration gets interrupted by unforeseen circumstances and that turns her into a defunct. Sabrina hides her defunct body in a cellar hoping to stay alive until a new body is occupied. Her sole motive in life is to keep Vishaila's decapitating body buoyant and she sets out on a mission to scout for a perfect human body to give her half-dead lover a new lease of life. She marries an affluent man, Mohit and crosses path with a doctor Aliya and his brother Aditya.

In the present, Mohit is handicapped due to Sabrina as he found out about her real identity. Sabrina hires Dr. Aliya to take care of Mohit. Aliya is shown to be an orphan as recently her father knew about the Vishkanya and thus was killed by Sabrina. Aliya hopes to find the truth about her father's death in Kothari Estate after spotting Mohit's condition similar to her father's. Mohit's arrogant, playboy and casanova type younger brother, Aditya returns from the US and shows his hatred for Sabrina as he blames her for Mohit's condition. He crosses paths with Aliya and the two take an instant dislike to each other. Soon, Aliya misunderstands Aditya to be the cause of Mohit's condition and the events happening around them whilst he thinks Aliya and Sabrina are working together. Sabrina is shown searching for a tattooed man with a special mark as he is the only person who can save her lover, Vishaila. Vishaila is kept in an ice chamber in Sabrina's bedroom closet and need a new heart every 13 days in order to stay alive. The tattooed man is shown to be Aditya however Sabrina doesn't know this and neither Aditya as he thinks it's a birthmark. Aditya's friend, Siddharth comes to the Estate but is killed by Sabrina as she misunderstands him to be the marked man. More evidence points to Aditya regarding Siddharth's death which makes Aliya suspicious and thus gets him arrested. However, she learns that he's innocent and gets him released. Meanwhile, Sabrina and Vishera fight and Sabrina captures him in a mirror and is bought by a girl. Aditya and Aliya slowly becomes friends as they search for clues together and they take a liking to one another.

Sabrina finds out Aditya is the tattooed-marked man and plots to kill him so she can resurrect Vishaila. However, her efforts are thwarted and she then turns a cat into a human being, Katrina, to help her in her plans of getting Aditya. She tells the family that Katrina is her best friend. Nonetheless, Katrina has her own plans of capturing Aditya as she wants to fully transform into a human and live forever. Sabrina goes to Vishlok to retrieve magic flower to heal Vishaila. Vishaila is found by Aliya in the ice chamber according to Katrina's plan. Meanwhile, Vishera breaks out of the mirror and is held captive by the girl who bought the mirror. Baba rudra does puja to see if Sabrina is vish kanya but Sabrina calls crows to take Vishaila away right on time. When Sabrina finds out about this her best friend and Katrina find themselves at loggerheads and thus they both challenge each other and become bitter enemies. Katrina places holy locket in Sabrina's bathtub to reveal Sabrina's truth but instead is trapped herself. Sabrina places a cage and says that the vish kanya will come to save the black crows. Sabrina puts milk outside and Katrina goes to dink it. A cage falls over Katrina and Sabrina makes everyone believe that Katrina is Vishkanya but then Mohit comes and can walk on his feet to help Katrina who has put a spell on Mohit so he can be her puppet against Sabrina.

Aliya envies Aditya and Katrina's closeness which is due to Katrina's plan even though Aditya has fallen for Aliya. Sabrina plots to kill both Aditya and Aliya while they are going for a drive and sends a snake after them. Aliya gets hurt in the process and Aditya takes her somewhere safe and they both confess their love and share romantic moments. Later, Katrina poses as Sabrina and announces Aditya and Katrina's marriage which angers Aditya and upsets Aliya. Katrina tries to make Aliya leave by injecting Aditya and making him hug her, which is seen by Aliya and she plans to leave the Estate. When Aditya finds out about this he stops her but Aliya humiliates him, so, therefore, Aditya agrees to marry Katrina and tells Aliya to stay until the wedding day. Aliya grows jealous and cannot hide her emotions whilst Aditya himself cannot stop thinking about her. Sabrina tries to capture Katrina in a book but does not succeed. Katrina steals Sabrina's eyes. Sabrina puts baby powder in Katrina's clothes which cats are allergic to. Sabrina calls Makrina to get her eyes back and is successful after Makrina and Katrina's fight on the chandelier.

Sabrina plots to get rid of Katrina by making everyone thinks she's the vishkanya which she succeeds in. Sabrina kills Baba Rudra, Katrina, and all of the other priests. Sabrina takes the choreographer outside at night because she needs to give his heart to Vishaila as it's been 13 days and Alia follows them. Aliya soon finds out about Sabrina and is shocked and heartbroken and runs away to tell Aditya. Katrina has one last life left and she uses it to take revenge from Sabrina by killing Vishaila. Before doing so she sets fire to the cellar where Sabrina, Katrina, and Vishaila is and Vishaila is killed by Katrina. Sabrina kills Katrina in rage and swears revenge on Aliya for Vishaila's death and plots to steal Aliya's love, Aditya and make him the new Vishaila. Sabrina stops Aliya from revealing the truth to Aditya and pushes her off a cliff which Aditya sees and tries to save Aliya but in vain.

=== 1 month later ===
Aliya is shown to be alive and was saved by a lady, Rudra Ma (who is later revealed to be Rudra baba). Aliya was unconscious for a month but as soon as she wakes up she remembers everything and escapes to save Aditya from Sabrina. But it is too late as Sabrina has now made Aditya her puppet and has been feeding him poison in order for her to obey her. She and Aditya are planning to marry. Aliya returns to the Estate and is shocked to see Aditya in this state. She vows to ruin Sabrina and save Aditya with the help of Maria and Rudra Ma. Everyone believes Mohit to be dead but in fact, he is captured in a freezer by Sabrina whilst he is too trying to escape to save Aditya. Sabrina sends snakes to kill Aliya but Aliya kills them all with the potion Rudra Ma gave her. She attacks Sabrina and traps her for a while on Aditya and Sabrina's wedding day. Maria tells her to go to Sabrina's place and marry Aditya which she does and the marriage is completed with Aditya marrying Aliya. Sabrina kills Maria. Now Aliya plans to ruin Sabrina as she is now a married woman and only a married woman can defeat a Vishkanya.

Sabrina and Aditya (who is under Sabrina's spell) plan to get rid of Aliya but Rudra Maa saves her. Aliya finds Maria's son who was kidnapped by Sabrina and finds out Sabrina has turned him into a crow. Aliya helps him run away and succeeds in doing so. Shekar, Aliya's best friend gives Aliya special herbs which she mixes in Aditiya's juice to eliminate the effect of vish in him. She succeeds and Aditya goes back to normal and he and Aliya get back together. Soon, they go on a honeymoon and Sabrina follow them. She calls the mermaid to help her and kill Aliya. Aliya kills the mermaid. Sabrina gives Aditiya poison before Aliya saves him. However, Aditya pushes Aliya off a balcony but she is saved in the nick of time by Rudra Maa. Sabrina gives poison to Aditya again. Rudra Maa gives Aliya a special bracelet to give to Aditya so the poison won't work on him and she does so by pretending to be alive around Aditya which scares him as he believes it is her ghost. Aliya succeeds in putting the bracelet on and Sabrina catches her so the latter tries to harm her but Aditya saves her as the bracelet charm worked on him and he now knows what Sabrina did.

The trio (Aditya, Aliya and Rudra Ma) joins hands to defeat Sabrina which they succeed and escape but Sabrina stabs Aliya with a glass of poison. Aditya and Rudra Maa take her to the temple to complete three meditations and Aliya fall unconscious and her condition worsens. Aditya decides to do meditation for Aliya. Sabrina goes to the king of demons for help. Aditiya complete earth and water meditation. Bhandari buries Alia. Sabrina hypnotizes the king of demons and tells him about Alia. King of demons kidnaps Alia and Aditiya eventually succeeds in killing him and captures Sabrina in a cage. Aditiya and Aliya marry. Sabrina escapes with the help of Rajni Gandha, her loyal servant. She calls Kalankini to help her interrupt the last meditation. Aliya kills Kalankini with the trident after being tortured by Kalankini. Aliya, Aditiya, and Rudra Ma drive Sabrina out of Kothari Estate by making a vermilion border around the entrance. Aliya and Aditiya consummate their marriage and Aditya's venomous mark disappears. Sabrina vows to come back and take revenge.

=== 3 months later ===
Sabrina is back. Aliya is three months pregnant with venomous mark child. Sabrina gets her powers back and is twice as powerful as before. She captures Rudra Ma in a bottle and enters Kothari Estate in a burqua. She introduces herself as Aliya's nurse. Aditya is suspicious. She poisons Aliya to increase the growth rate of the child. She reveals her identity. Vishera, Sabrina's enemy is back. Sabrina kills him but he drives her out of Kothari Estate. Without the bottle with Rudra Ma in it, she cannot enter. Rajni Gandha is caught while trying to get the bottle. Sabrina awakens Mohit whose brain has stopped functioning due to being in the freezer. Aditiya and Aliya make him normal by reminding him of his past. Rudra Ma is free from the bottle. Sabrina goes to Damori and Sakchunni for help. Sabrina calls Damori and Sakchunni and with their help destroys the vermilion border. They enter the house during Aliya's baby shower. Damori and Sakchunni are killed. Mohit dies. Sabrina steals Aliya's womb and takes it to a cave. They follow Sabrina to the cave. Aliya sacrifices her life for her child. The child is born. Aditya kills Sabrina by turning into vish purush. Sabrina vows to come back for her vish child.

=== 7 years later ===
Aditya and Aliya's daughter has now grown and is called Meera. Aditya is a great father, however he misses Aliya. Meera is shown to have a venomous mark on her back. Sabrina also returns and is now fully healed. She kept Mohit alive all these years. She enters the house with Mohit. Meera kills a butterfly with her evil vision. Sabrina soon befriends Meera. She tells her to tell Aditya that Sabrina is back so therefore Meera tells Aditya. The season ends with Aditya and Sabrina came face to face and Sabrina tells Aditya that the second chapter is yet to begin...

== Cast ==
=== Main ===
- Debina Bonnerjee as Vishaili/Sabrina Kothari:
  - A Vishkanya disguised as a human
- Sana Makbul as Dr. Aliya Kothari (née Sanyal):
  - Mohit's doctor, Aditya's wife and Mira's mother
- Vishal Vashishtha as Aditya Veer Kothari:
  - Mohit's brother, Aliya's husband and Mira's father

=== Recurring ===
- Ankit Gulati as Mohit Veer Kothari – Aditya's brother, Sabrina's husband
- Krip Suri as Vishera – Sabrina's nemesis
- Divya Bhatnagar as Shabnam Khaala
- Sunila Karambelkar as Maria – housekeeper of Kothari Estate
- Snehal Rai as Raina – Vishera's lover
- Shantanu Monga as Siddharth – Aditya's best friend
- Yajuvendra Singh as Dr. Sanyal – Aliya's father
- Rupesh Kataria as Ronnie
- Sandeep Bhojak as Shyam
- Manuj Nagpal as Daitya Raj – King of Daitya Nagari, Sabrina's lover
- Nalini Negi as Katrina
- Puja Banerjee as Makrina
- Puneett Chouksey as Aghori Baba
- Ritu Shivpuri as Rudra Maa
- Arshi Khan as Bhayankiri Kalankini
- Jasleen Matharu as Sanya/Jalakshini – Aditya's friend
- Ayush Anand as Shekhar Malhotra – an inspector, Aliya's friend

== Production ==
Vish first teaser revealed before one week of show launch and due to low TRPs it ended in three months.

Later, it was announced that the show will return with new season in October 2019 on OTT platform Voot but later it was announced that new season scrapped.
