= Neeraj Goyat =

Indian professional boxer (born 1991)

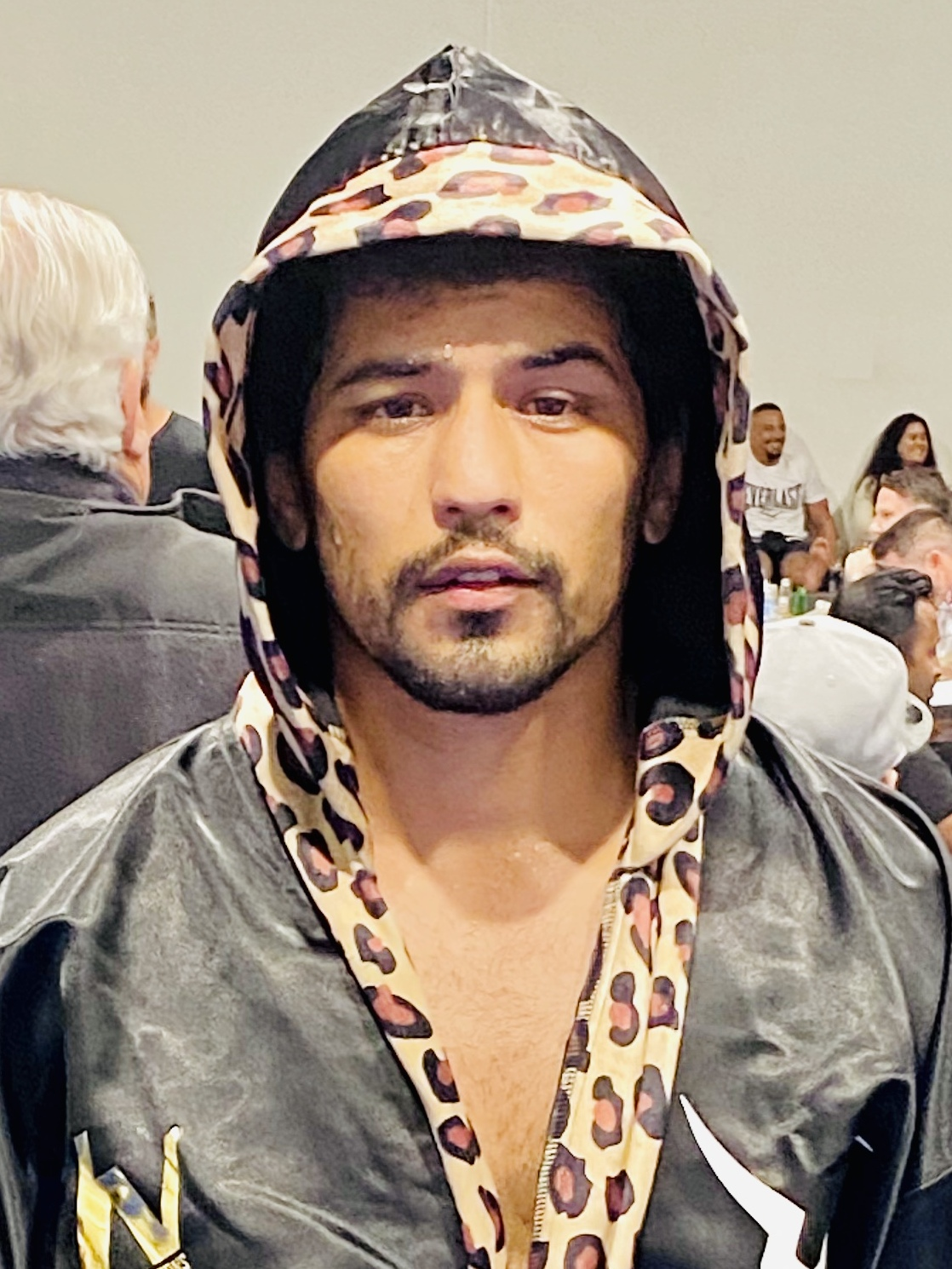
- Goyat in Auckland, 2020
- Born: 11 November 1991 (age 34); Begumpur, Haryana, India
- Height: 1.71 m (5 ft 7 1/2 in)
- Weight: 147 lb (67 kg; 10 st 7 lb)
- Division: Featherweight; Super Featherweight; Lightweight; Super Lightweight; Welterweight; Super Middleweight

Professional boxing record
- Total: 27
- Wins: 21
- By knockout: 9
- Losses: 4
- Draws: 2

Mixed martial arts record
- Total: 2
- Wins: 2
- By knockout: 1
- By decision: 1
- Losses: 0

Other information
- Boxing record from BoxRec
- Mixed martial arts record from Sherdog

Neeraj Goyat (born 11 November 1991) is an Indian professional boxer. He is the first Indian boxer to enter the World Boxing Council (WBC) world rankings, debuting at No. 35 in the welterweight division in November 2016 following his successful defense of the WBC Asia title. Goyat won the WBC Asia “Honorary Boxer of the Year” award in 2017, and is a three-time WBC Asia champion (2015, 2016, 2017) in the welterweight division.

He also won the “Most Promising Boxer” award at the Indian Youth Nationals in 2008. In June 2014, Goyat became the first fighter to defeat Chinese boxer Xu Can (also known as Can Xu) in China, winning via split decision over 4 rounds; Xu Can later became a former WBA (Regular) featherweight world champion Goyat has faced notable opponents, including former world title challenger Jose Zepeda (loss by unanimous decision in March 2023).

Neeraj suffered severe injuries in a car accident in June 2019, including to his head, face, and left arm, which forced him to withdraw from a scheduled fight against Amir Khan. He has since recovered and resumed competing.

In June 2024, Goyat appeared on the reality TV show, Bigg Boss OTT Season 3. However, he was eliminated from the show after just 5 days. On 15 November 2024, he defeated Whindersson Nunes on the Jake Paul vs. Mike Tyson undercard.

== Early life ==
Neeraj Goyat was born on 11 November 1991 in Begumpur village, Karnal district, Haryana, India. He completed his schooling up to the 9th standard at S. D. Model School in Yamunanagar, Haryana.

Inspired by the impressive physique, personality, fitness, and longevity of athletes, he initially engaged in athletics but switched to boxing after being inspired by the boxers training around him. In 2006, at age 14, he joined the Army Sports Institute (ASI) in Pune as a cadet, where he began formal boxing training and completed his 10th standard education. He received excellent coaching there and learned from senior athletes.

In his amateur career:

• He won a bronze medal at the Junior National Championships in 2007 (his first major national achievement).

• In 2008, he secured a gold medal at the Youth National Championships and was awarded the “Most Promising Boxer” title in India that year.

• He earned a bronze medal at the Youth Commonwealth Games in 2008 (held in Pune, India, in the lightweight).

• He participated in the Youth World Championships in Mexico the same year.

• From 2009 onward (transitioning to senior level), he won medals in various senior national events, including silver at the National Games in 2011 and silver at the Senior National Championships in 2012. He continued competing in national championships and international events through 2016, such as the World Military Games in Brazil (2011) and narrowly missing Olympic qualification with a bronze medal at the 2016 Olympic Qualifiers in Venezuela.

== Professional career ==
Neeraj Goyat was the first Indian professional boxer who went to Venezuela for the Olympic qualifiers before the 2016 Summer Olympics and won a bronze medal. He won the award of WBC Asia ‘Honorary Boxer of the Year’ 2017.

In June 2024, Goyat appeared as a contestant on the reality TV show Bigg Boss OTT Season 3, which premiered on June 21, 2024, hosted by Anil Kapoor and streamed on JioCinema. He was the first contestant eliminated on Day 5 (June 25–26, 2024) following a mid-week eviction twist involving audience and housemate votes.

He also made a guest appearance on The Great Indian Kapil Show (Season 2, Episode 8, aired around November 2024 on Netflix), where he joined business icons Narayana Murthy, Sudha Murthy, Deepinder Goyal, and Gia Goyal. During the episode, he provided light-hearted banter and shared stories, which led to Zomato CEO Deepinder Goyal later announcing sponsorship support for Goyat ahead of his November fight.

On November 15, 2024, he defeated Brazilian YouTuber-turned-boxer Whindersson Nunes via unanimous decision (scores of 59–55, 60–54, 60–54) in a six-round super middleweight bout on the undercard of the Jake Paul vs. Mike Tyson event at AT&T Stadium in Arlington, Texas, streamed on Netflix. This marked a notable win in his professional career (updating his record to 19-4-2 at the time).

=== Performance in pro boxing ===
- 3x WBC Asian title holder
- WBC Asian Champion 2015
- WBC Asian Champion 2016
- WBC Asian Champion 2017

=== Performance in amateur boxing ===
==== International level achievements ====
- Olympic Qualifiers Tournament 2016 Venezuela – Bronze Medal
- Youth Commonwealth Games 2008 – Bronze Medal
- Youth World Championship 2008 Mexico – Participation
- President Cup Indonesia 2011 – Participation
- World Military Games 2011 Brazil – Participation

==== National level achievements ====
- Junior National 2007 – Bronze
- Youth National 2008 – Gold
- All India Super Cup 2010 – Silver
- All India AK Mishra 2010 – Gold
- National Games 2011 – Silver
- Senior National 2012 – Silver

=== Signing with Most Valuable Promotions ===
Neeraj has made some noise. His callout video got 25 million views. He’s India’s biggest and best boxer. So, it is interesting to me, it could be fun to go over to India, and knock him out in his home country. Maybe one day, but we’ll see.

— Jake Paul, President of Most Valuable Promotions

Goyat called out YouTuber-turned-professional boxer Jake Paul to fight "a real boxer" on Instagram after Paul's victory over André August. The callout video received 25 million views, and Paul responded to the callout by replying, "Any time, any place." Paul was announced to fight on March 2, 2024, against an unannounced opponent, where fans speculated it might be Goyat. Ryan Bourland was announced as the unannounced opponent, and Goyat continued to call out Paul on social media, to which Paul responded by asking Goyat to come to Puerto Rico. During the build-up between Paul and Bourland, Goyat travelled his way to Puerto Rico, where he got into a physical altercation with Paul before being separated away. Goyat later signed a contract with Paul's boxing promotion, Most Valuable Promotions, becoming the first international fighter to sign to the promotion. After signing with Most Valuable Promotions, Goyat revealed that before signing the contract, Paul and MVP (Most Valuable Promotions) promised that Paul versus Goyat would happen in India, but after Jake Paul vs. Mike Tyson fought first.

==== Goyat vs. Nunes ====
On May 21, 2024, it was announced that Goyat would face Brazilian YouTuber and comedian Whindersson Nunes on the undercard of the Jake Paul vs. Mike Tyson event at the AT&T Stadium in Arlington, Texas, United States, which is globally hosted on Netflix for July 20, 2024. However, due to personal health issues with Mike Tyson, the event was postponed and rescheduled for November 15, 2024. The fight was later announced to be in the super middleweight division and a six-round bout. During the press conference, Goyat predicted Mike Tyson would defeat Jake Paul, which led Paul to set up bets with Goyat and Bruce Carrington for $1 million each and Katie Taylor for her full fight purse. At the weigh-ins, Nunes weighed in at 164 lbs (74 kg), and Goyat weighed in at 162 lbs (73 kg). Nunes and Goyat showed respect during their face-off. Goyat defeated Nunes via unanimous decision, with the judges scoring the bout 59–55, 60–54 (x2) in favour of Goyat. After the bout, fans expressed their disgust with Goyat online for his unsportsmanship by dry-humping Nunes in the corner during the fight.

==== Goyat vs. Taylor ====
On November 16, 2025, it was announced that Goyat would face American social media influencer Slim Albaher on the Misfits Mania – The Fight Before Christmas undercard scheduled for December 20 at the Dubai Duty Free Tennis Stadium in Dubai, United Arab Emirates. On December 5, Albaher withdrew from the bout following an injury sustained during training, and was replaced with American mixed martial artist Anthony Taylor. The bout will be recognized as MF–professional, meaning it will not be recorded on Goyat's official record.

== Boxing record ==
=== Professional ===
26 fights	20 wins	4 losses
By knockout	9	0
By decision	11	4
Draws	2	

No.	Result	Record	Opponent	Type	Round, time	Date	Location	Notes
27	Win	21-4-2	Yessin Koulali	PTS	8	Aug 29, 2026	Bp pulse LIVE, Birmingham, England	
26	Win	20-4-2	Mark Urvanov	RTD	6 (10), 3:00	Jun 18, 2026	USC Soviet Wings, Moscow, Russia	
25	Win	19–4–2	Whindersson Nunes	UD	6	Nov 15, 2024	AT&T Stadium, Arlington, Texas, US	
24	Win	18–4–2	Phakorn Aiemyod	TKO	2 (8), 1:44	May 17, 2023	Sasakul Gym, Lam Luk Ka, Thailand	
23	Loss	17–4–2	Jose Zepeda	UD	10	Mar 25, 2023	El Domo del Code Jalisco, Guadalajara, Mexico	
22	Win	17–3–2	Channarong Injampa	TKO	2 (6), 2:19	Jul 2, 2022	Spaceplus Bangkok RCA, Bangkok, Thailand	
21	Win	16–3–2	Chayanon Phothijun	TKO	3 (6), 1:35	May 28, 2022	Singmanassask Muay Thai School, Pathum Thai, Thailand	
20	Win	15–3–2	Parinwirat Kankrai	TKO	2 (6), 0:55	May 14, 2022	Singmanassask Muay Thai School, Pathum Thai, Thailand	
19	Win	14–3–2	Suresh Pasham	UD	6	Apr 10, 2022	Manipal, India	
18	Win	13–3–2	Bebe Rico Tshibangu	TKO	3 (4)	Oct 16, 2021	La Perle, Dubai, UAE	
17	Win	12–3–2	Sandeep Kumar	KO	4 (4), 0:34	Mar 19, 2021	Majestic Pride Ship, Panjim, India	
16	Win	11–3–2	Carlos Lopez Marmolejo	UD	6	Apr 20, 2019	Danforth Music Hall, Toronto, Canada	
15	Win	10–3–2	Ernesto Cardona Sanchez	UD	4	Sep 7, 2018	Shaw Conference Centre, Edmonton, Canada	
14	Loss	9–3–2	Sergio Daniel Moreno Martinez	UD	6	Jun 30, 2018	Arena San Juan de Pantitlan, Ciudad Nezahualcoyotl, Mexico	
13	Win	9–2–2	Allan Tanada	UD	12	Aug 5, 2017	NSCI Stadium, Worli, Mumbai, India	Defended WBC Asian welterweight title
12	Win	8–2–2	Ben Kite	UD	12	Oct 15, 2016	Talkatora Stadium, New Delhi, India	Defended WBC Asian welterweight title
11	Win	7–2–2	Moda	KO	5 (6)	Jan 5, 2016	Hydro Gym & Boxing Club, Gurgaon, India	
10	Win	6–2–2	Dong Jun You	KO	2 (4)	Dec 12, 2015	Team RSC Gym, Seoul, South Korea	
9	Win	5–2–2	Anand	UD	4	Oct 31, 2015	New Delhi, India	
8	Win	4–2–2	Ronnel Esparas	UD	6	Oct 4, 2015	Sunhak Gymnasium, Incheon, South Korea	
7	Win	3–2–2	Nelson Gulpe	UD	12	May 30, 2015	Select Citywalk Saket, New Delhi, India	Won vacant WBC Asian welterweight title
6	Win	2–2–2	Can Xu	SD	4	Jun 7, 2014	Expo Garden Hall, Kunming, China	
5	Win	1–2–2	Xian Qian Wei	UD	6	Nov 30, 2013	Maguan, China	
4	Loss	0–2–2	Chatri Charoensin	UD	6	Sep 27, 2013	Chom Thong District Office, Bangkok, Thailand	
3	Draw	0–1–2	Xian Qian Wei	SD	6	Jun 8, 2013	Expo Garden Hotel, Kunming, China	
2	Draw	0–1–1	Phum Kunmat	PTS	4	Sep 5, 2012	Bangkapi School, Bangkapi, Bangkok, Thailand	
1	Loss	0–1	Gou Wen Dong	SD	4	Nov 19, 2011	Expo Garden Hotel, Kunming, China	

=== MF–Professional ===
1 fight	1 win	0 losses
By decision	1	0

No.	Result	Record	Opponent	Type	Round, time	Date	Location	Notes
1	Win	1–0	Anthony Taylor	UD	6	Dec 20, 2025	Dubai Duty Free Tennis Stadium, Dubai, UAE	

== Mixed martial arts record ==
Professional record breakdown
2 matches	2 wins	0 losses
By knockout	1	0
By decision	1	0

Res.	Record	Opponent	Method	Event	Date	Round	Time	Location	Notes
Win	2–0	Mohammed Farhad	Decision (unanimous)	Super Fight League 30-31	October 12, 2013	3	5:00	Mumbai, India	
Win	1–0	Rahul Sonkamble	TKO (punches)	SFL Contenders 13	August 5, 2013	1	0:51	Nashik, India	Bantamweight debut.

== Filmography ==
=== Television shows on boxing ===
- SFL Challengers - telecasted in August 2012 on Zoom (TV channel).
- 2013 in SFL numbered events.
- Captain of the team Haryana Warriors in Super Boxing League Season 1 - telecasted on Sony ESPN from 7 July to 12 August 2017.

=== Reality television ===
- 2024 - Bigg Boss OTT 3 as a contestant - evicted on Day 5, finishing in 17th place.
- 2025 - Battle Ground Amazon MX Player as a mentor for the UP Dabangs team.

=== Films ===
- Neeraj Goyat made his Bollywood debut with Anurag Kashyap’s film Mukkabaaz.
- Ultimate Beastmaster - telecasted in December 2017 Via Netflix.
- Toofaan as a boxer
- Telugu movie RRR (film)
- Telugu movie Ghani (2022 film)
