= Komal Kothari =

Indian folk artist and classical singer

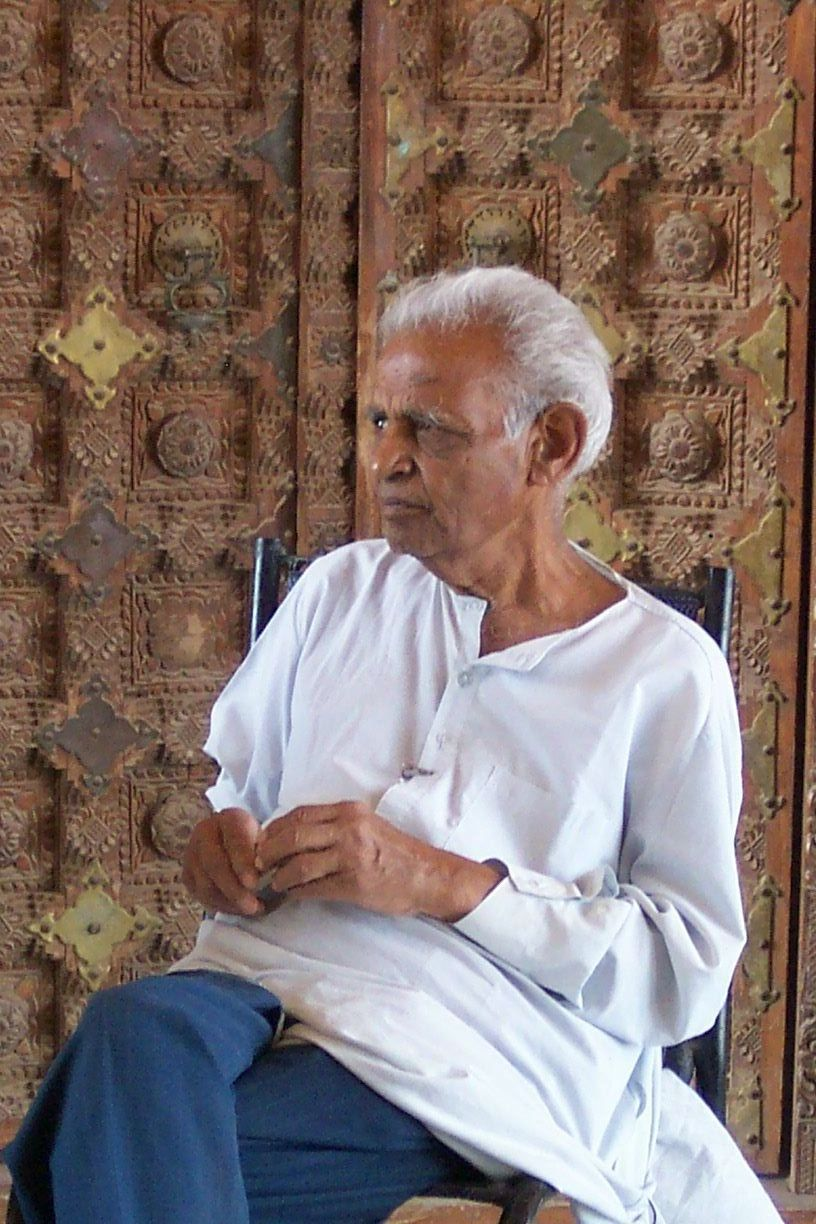
Komal Kothari

Komal Kothari (1929–2004) was an Indian folklorist and ethnomusicologist. Komal Kothari had devoted his life to investigation and documentation of folk traditions of western Rajasthan. Kothari received the honour of Padma Shri and Padma Bhushan from the Government of India. Komal Kothari painstakingly worked to preserve the cultural memory and made numerous recordings of folk music. He studied Langa and Manganiyar communities of folk musicians of Thar desert.

Komal Kothari was not only a scholar but also a man of action. He co-founded Rupayan Sansthan - Rajasthan Institute of Folklore, in 1960 in the village of Borunda. The institution houses a repository of recordings by Kothari and works to collect, preserve, and disseminate the oral traditions of Rajasthan. Kothari was co-editor of the journal Lok Sanskriti, a journal based on the theme of folk culture. Besides, Kothari arranged international performances of folk artists from Rajasthan in several countries. His monograph on Langas, a folk-musician caste in Rajasthan, was enlivened by an accompanying album of recordings of twelve folk songs sung by Langa artistes. His understanding of desert culture and its connections with ecology endeared him to the environmentalists.

He planned a museum based on the ecology of the broom’, to show the technical use of specific types of desert grass for specific purposes. His vision was actualised in the form of Arna Jharna - The Thar Desert Museum of Rajasthan in Borunda, near Jodhpur. Kothari was a scholar of patterns of culture and his expertise enriched both folklore studies and history.

== Career ==
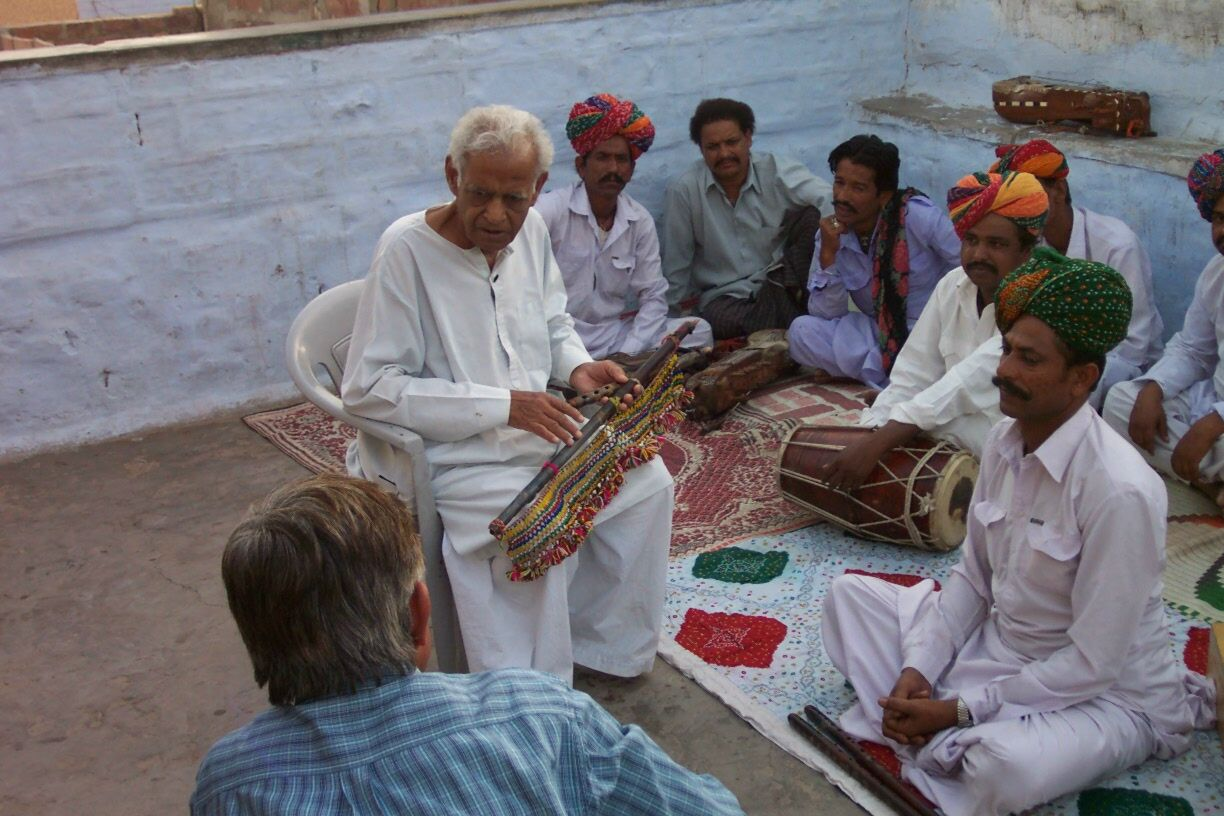
Komal Kothari with Langa musicians.

Kothari's research resulted in his development of the study of a number of areas of folklore. In particular, he made contributions to the study of musical instruments, oral traditions and puppetry. He was also a patron of Langa and Manganiyar folk music, the latter of which translates to 'beggars' and is currently used as a debasing term for Merasi. He was the first to record them and helped shem out of their traditional regions.

To this end, he also founded the magazine 'Prerna'. Kothari was the chairman of Rupayan Sansthan founded by Chandi Dan Detha and worked with Vijaydan Detha at Borunda village in Rajasthan, an institute that documents Rajasthani folk-lore, arts and music, and spent most of his career at the Rajasthan Sangeet Natak Academy.

== Books and articles ==
- Monograph on Langas: a folk musician caste of Rajasthan. 1960.
- Folk musical instruments of Rajasthan: a folio. Rajasthan Institute of Folklore, 1977.
- Gods of the Byways. Museum of Modern Art, Oxford. 1982. ISBN 0-905836-28-6.
- Rajasthan: The Living Traditions, Prakash Book Depot. 2000. ISBN 81-7234-031-1.
- Life and works of Padma Bhushan Shri Komal Kothari (1929-2004), by Komal Kothari, National Folklore Support Centre, NFSC. 2004.
- “The Folk Legacy of Rajasthan”, Quarterly Journal of the National Centre for Performing Arts, Vol. 1, No. 2, 1972, pp. 1–8
- “The Langas – A Folk Musician Caste of Rajasthan”, Journal of Sangeet Natak Akademi, Vol. 27, pp. 5–26, 1972
- Monograph on Langas: A Folk Musician Caste of Rajasthan. Rupayan Sansthan, Jodhpur, 1972
- “The Shrine - An Expression of Social Needs”, Julia Elliott and David Elliott (eds.), Gods of the Byways: Wayside Shrines of Rajasthan, Madhya Pradesh, and Gujarat, Museum of Modern Art, Oxford, 1982 pp. 1–31
- “Performers, Gods, and Heroes in the Oral Epics of Rajasthan”, Stuart H. Blackburn, Peter J Claus, Joyce B. Flueckiger. and Susan S. Wadley (eds.), Oral epics in India, pp. 102–117, University of California Press, Berkley, 1989
- “Lokvarta Sambandhi Mul Sangrah”, Jawaharlal Handoo (ed.), Folklore of Rajasthan, Central Institute of Indian Languages, pp. 232–244, Manasgangotri, Mysore, 1983
- “Introduction”, Munshi Hardayal Singh, The Castes of Marwar (being Census Report of 1891), pp. i-xiii, Book Treasure, Jodhpur, 1990
- “Patronage and Performance”, N. K. Singhi and Rajendra Joshi (eds.), Folk, Faith, and Feudalism: Rajasthan Studies, pp. 55–66, Rawat Publications, Jaipur, 1995
- “Musicians for the People: The Manganiyars of Western Rajasthan”, Karine Schomer, Joan L. Erdman, Deryck O. Lodrick, Lloyd I. Rudolph (eds.), The Idea of Rajasthan – Explorations in Regional Identity, Volume I: Constructions, pp. 205–237, Manohar and American Institute of Indian Studies, Delhi, 2001
- Rustom Bharucha, Rajasthan - An Oral History, Conversations with Komal Kothari, Penguin Books, New Delhi, 2003
- “On Folk Narratives”, Indian Folklife, Volume 3, Issue 3, S. No. 16, pp. 14–20, July 2004
- Neuman Daniel, Shubha Chaudhuri with Komal Kothari, Bards, Ballads, and Boundaries – An Ethnographic Atlas of Music Traditions in West Rajasthan, Seagull, Calcutta, New York, 2006

== Awards and honours ==
- Padma Shri in 1983
- Sangeet Natak Akademi Fellowship in 1986
- Padma Bhushan in 2004
- Rajasthan Ratna award 2012

== Legacy ==
A 1979 documentary film on his ethnomusicology work, and another titled Komal Da, on his life and works, are now archived at Columbia University Libraries. Kothari's work on the oral epics of Rajasthan further extended his argument of geographical connections of folk music. He posited that oral epics correspond to specific agricultural and occupational zones. Kothari had made a deeper inquiry of folk traditions to make insightful observations on poer structures and hegemony that informed the historians of Rajasthan significantly.

Kothari conceived and started his work for the Arna Jharna Museum in 2000 in the village of Moklawas, near Jodhpur. The museum space has been designed as a section of Thar desert and its native vegetation like different cacti, and agrarian produce like jowar, bajra, and makka. It has replicas of village architecture, a boastful collection of the region musical instruments, puppets, and pottery. “The museum boasts mainly of an extensive collection of brooms from Rajasthan, indicating entire galaxies of rituals and beliefs associated with them."

== See also ==
- Musical Instruments of Rajasthan
