= Arna Jharna Museum =

Museum in Rajasthan, India

Arna Jharna
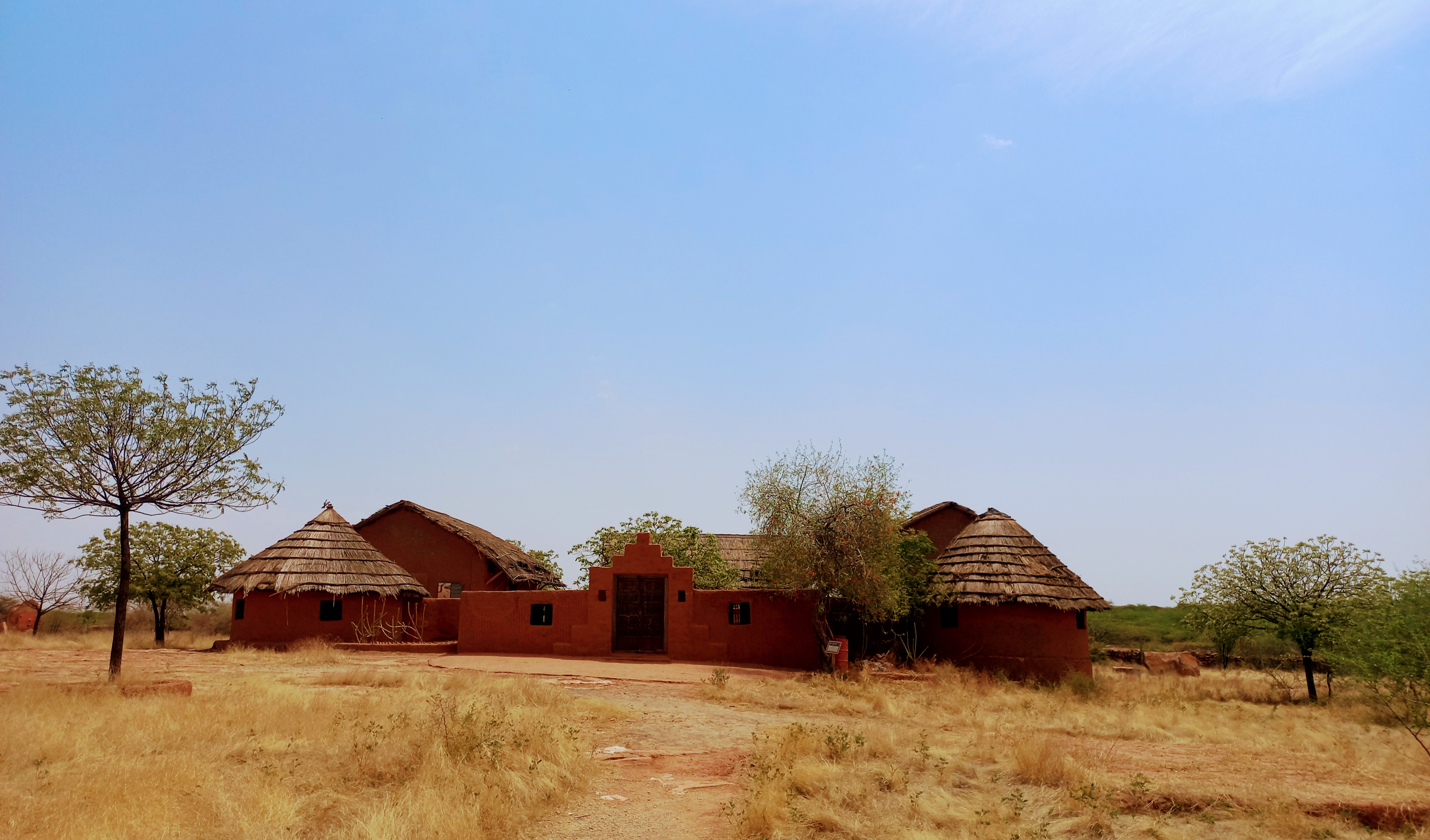
- Established: 2000
- Location: Rajasthan, India
- Coordinates: 26.29651°N 72.89511°E
- Type: Folk museum
- Website: www.arnajharna.org.in

Arna Jharna Museum (or Arna Jharna – The Thar Desert Museum) is a folk museum located in a village called Moklawas near Jodhpur in Rajasthan. The museum opened in 2000 under the aegis of Rupayan Sansthan. It is a Museum of Folk Culture envisioned by eminent folklorist and ethno-musicologist, Padma Bhushan Komal Kothari (1929 – 2004). Arna Jharna literally means Forest and Spring. Its location showcases the terrain of Marwar region through rocky outcrops, desert cacti, and ravines.

The museum captures the ethnography of Rajasthan through everyday objects that reflect ecology, intangible heritage and cultural practices of the region and its communities. Kothari had stated that this museum will not house antique artifacts, precious curios, or objects of high monetary value. Many facets of knowledge and skills of a culture are kept alive by communities by passing it from one generation to another. Thus, the museum displays objects to explain cultural processes, community linkages, and regional contexts. It is also called a living museum where the objects are part of the daily lives of common people.

== Vision ==
The aim of the Arna Jharna Museum is to showcase indigenous and traditional knowledge systems of Thar Desert. It houses objects that link cultural practices of the region to larger ecological frameworks. Komal Kothari, who conceptualized this museum, was a renowned folklorist. He saw that the rich traditional knowledge is vanishing rapidly with increasing urbanization. He would say, “My grandmother could identify ninety-five colours, today we can name about twenty…” These concerns were at the base of his vision of an ethnographic museum. Museum director and secretary of Rupayan Sansthan, Kuldeep Kothari recalled the words of his father Komal, that the museum “will relate the story of the creative ingenuity of the common folk by tracing the history of tangible cultural objects and the role they play in their daily life.”

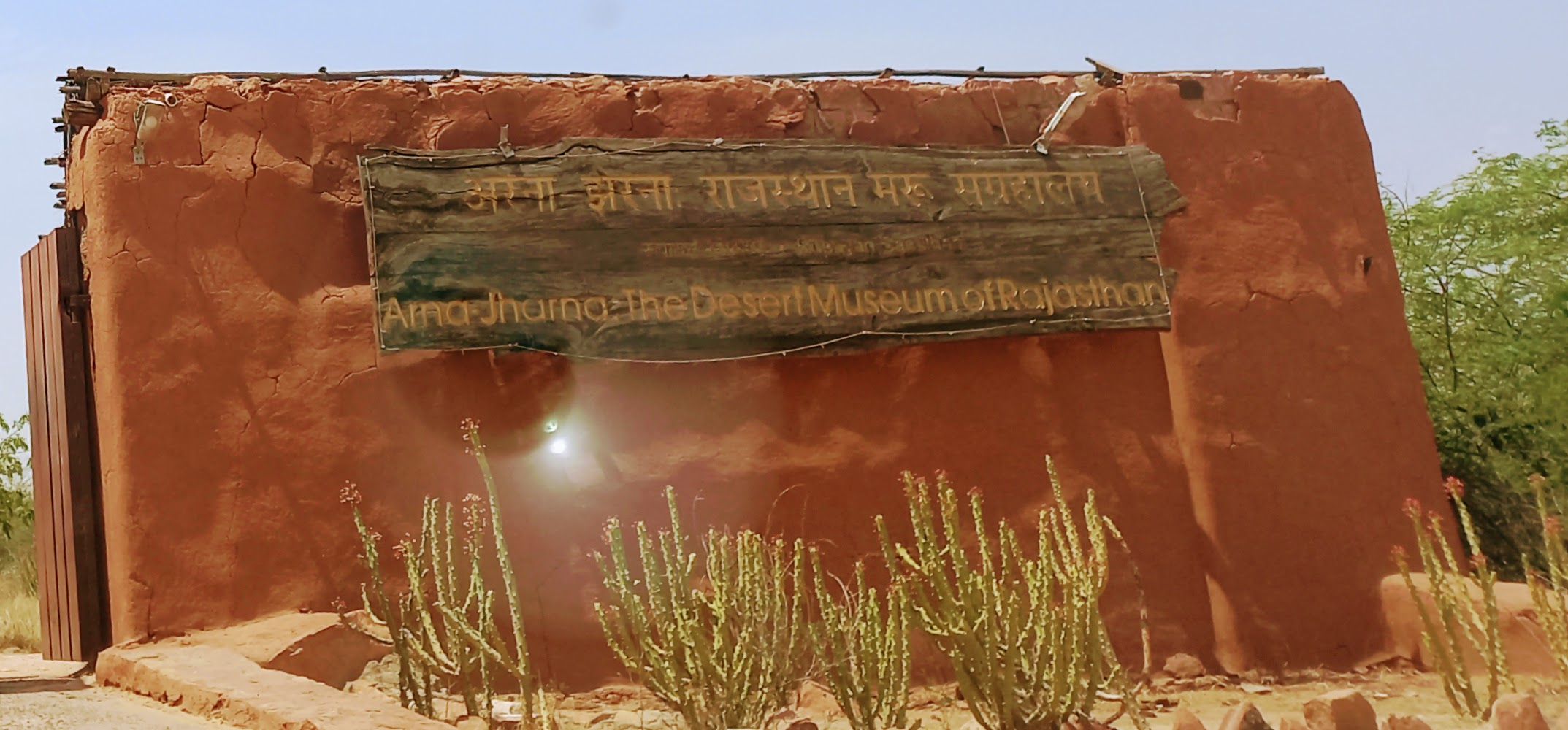
Entrance, Arna Jharna Museum

=== Theme ===
Main theme of the Arna Jharna Museum is folk elements of knowledge which have both tangible and intangible aspects. Therefore, the physical display of objects has been complemented by research-based documentation of the cultural process related to it. The purpose is to curate a collection based on scientific research of the folk culture of Thar which can be taken forward by experts and scholars of the field. It focuses on objects that carry stories of use, continuity, and survival of traditional knowledge of the folk.

=== Method ===
For deconstructing the folk culture, Kothari found the political and administrative divisions of little or no use. He divided Rajasthan into three zones based on their predominant crop. Thus, Rajasthan was divided into three crop zones – Bajra (millet), Jowar (barley), Makka (maize) and objects were collected and displayed zone wise.

Kothari also devised an ecological framework of socio-economic activities based on the crop patterns of rural communities in Rajasthan. Rural folk conduct marriage, fairs, festivals in accordance with crop patterns of sowing, harvesting, marketing etc. Specific biodiversity is showcased through rural folk objects that use locally available produce to create utility and decorative objects. Thus, local and regional context of connections of ecology and folk culture are illustrated in the design and display of the museum.

== Design and display ==
The museum fosters exhibits designed to recreate desert life and folk culture to support experiential learning.

=== Location and space ===
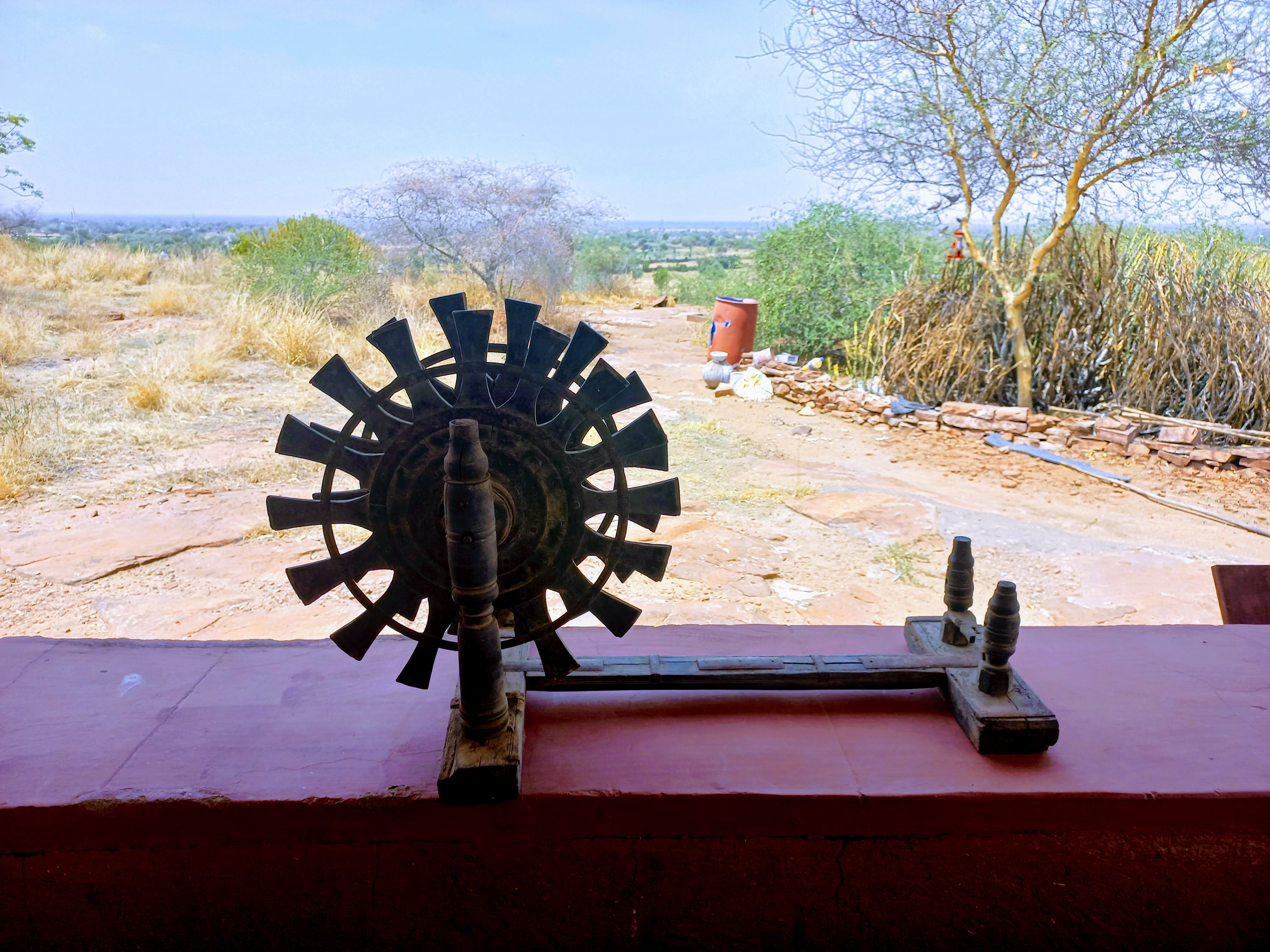
Open Space, Arna Jharna Museum

The museum is located on a terrain that is home to desert flora and fauna and the open spaces between different exhibits highlight desert vegetation and trees of the region. The buildings are designed according to the principles of local architecture. The red-brown walls are coated with local mixture of animal dung. The thatched roofs make use of local grass, and the decorative motifs are drawn from the repertoire of folk art of desert villages. The constructed structures merge seamlessly with the terrain. With the carefully curated exhibits, museum premises have been designed to facilitate a holistic experience of desert life and culture.

=== Display and labels ===
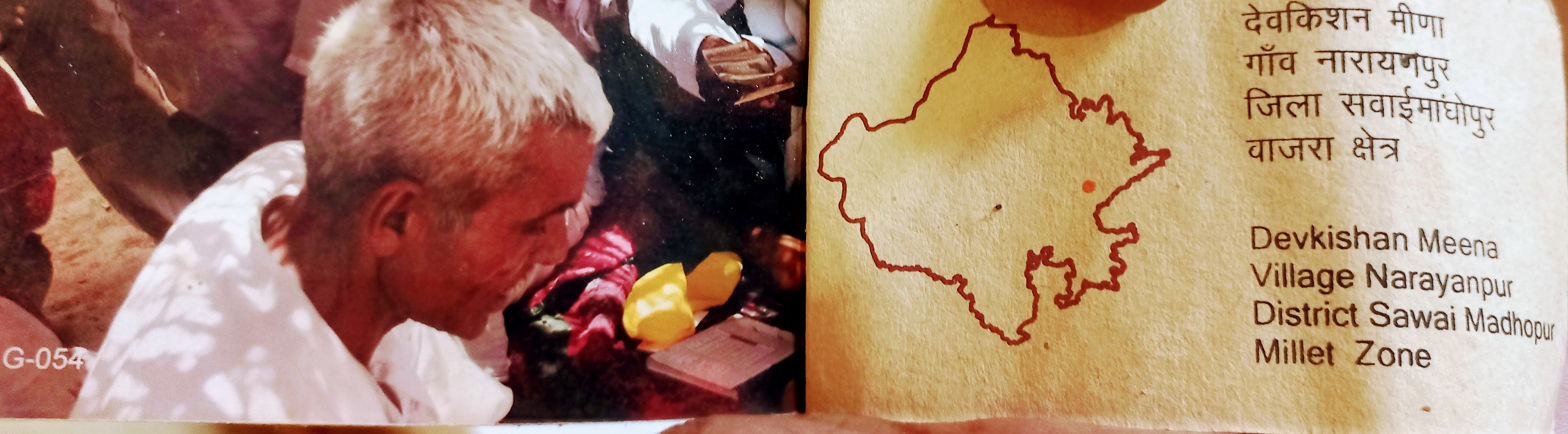
Object Label, Arna Jharna Museum

The objects are all divided into the three crop categories. For example, broom collection of which zone is displayed in different section. The objects are not kept in closed cases but kept in the open just as they are kept in households. The labels indicate the name of the object, for example, the type of the broom or the specific folk instrument. It has a photograph of the object, sometimes with its owner or creator, in real conditions. It records the details of the manufacturer, community, and region associated with the object. A small outline map of Rajasthan has been included in the label to indicate the exact location from where the object has been procured.

== Collections ==
The collection of the museum has more than a thousand objects of which brooms alone are more than three hundred in number. The collection has been arranged into five exhibitions in the museum – broom, folk musical instruments, pottery, puppetry, and millets.

=== Broom ===
The broom exhibition is unique in showing the diversity and ecological linkages of common household objects. It is the largest exhibit of the museum. Kothari had initially thought of a museum based on the ecology of brooms. The brooms are exhibited in makka and bajra zones and different uses are showcased through the variation in their design and manufacturing material. The different types of grass of the desert are identified. The display recreates rural styles of tying a broom, some simply with whatever came in hand, some artistically with designer knots, while some have colour or ghunghroo added to them. The exhibition also has an album of grass. There is also an exhibition brooms of shrine. A traditional shrine with doors, called Kawad in Rajasthan, is used for storage and display of manufacturing process and material of different types of brooms. The display was designed and curated by display artist Madan Meena.

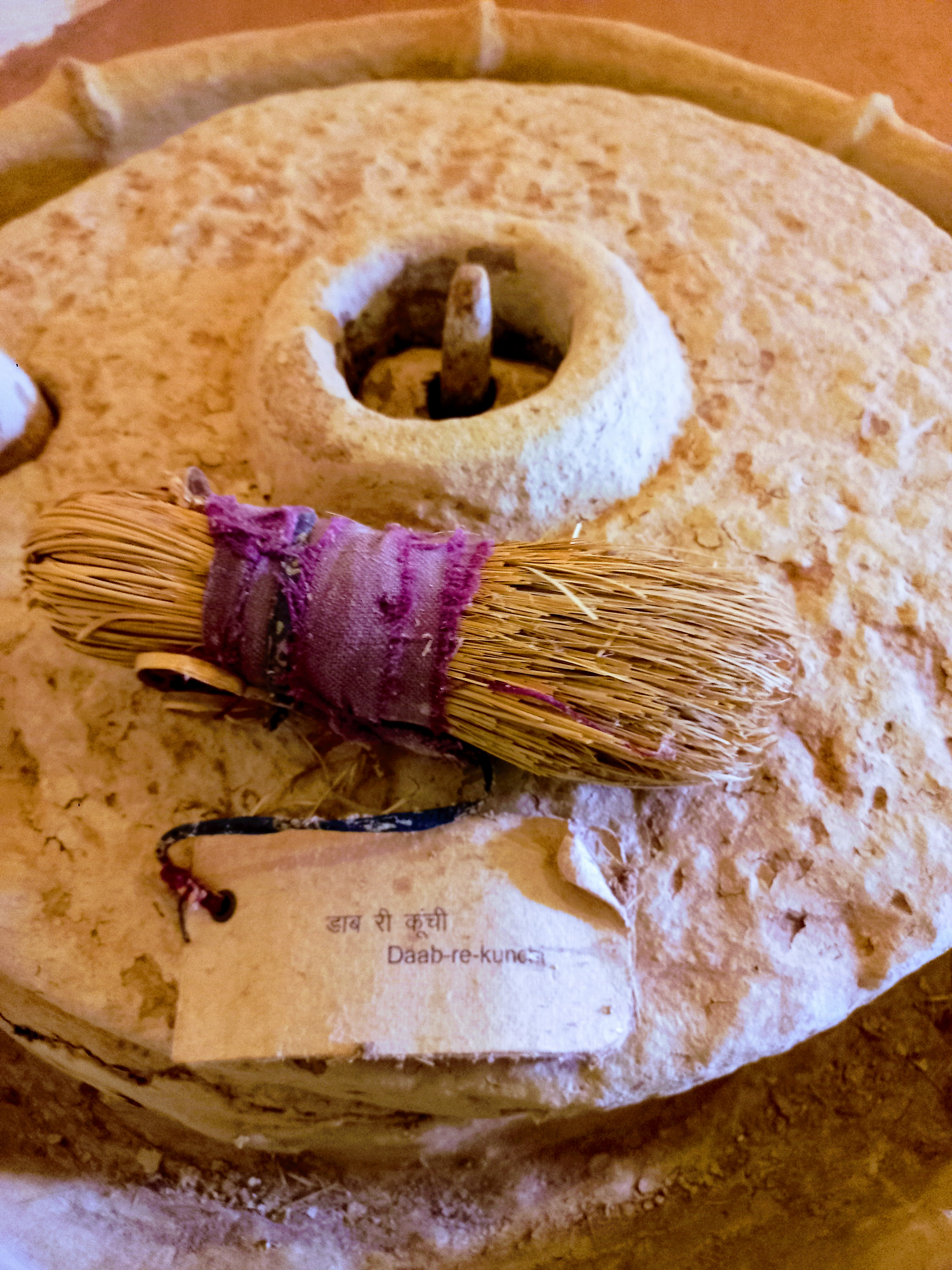
Broom made of Daab Grass

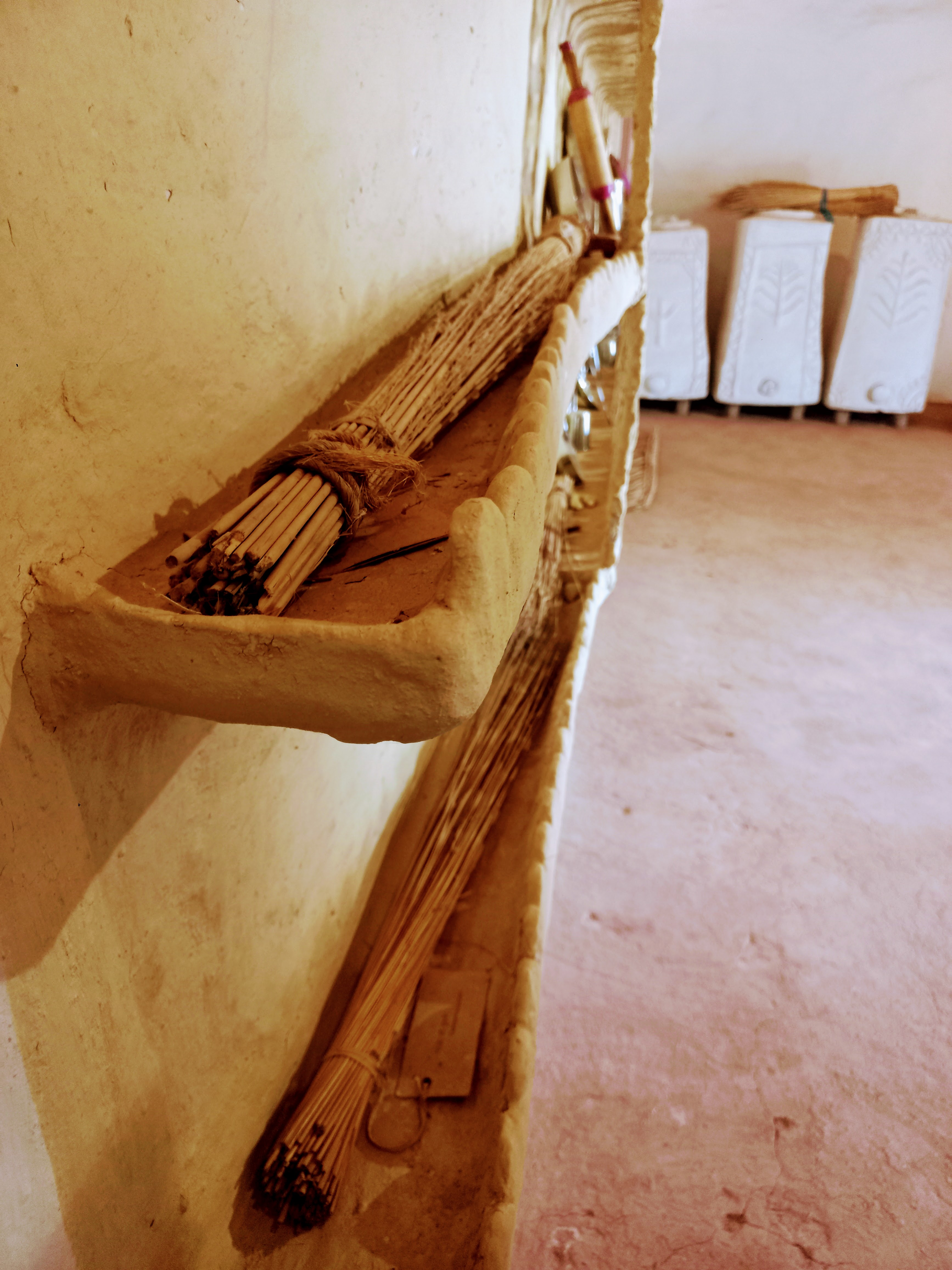
Broom Shelf

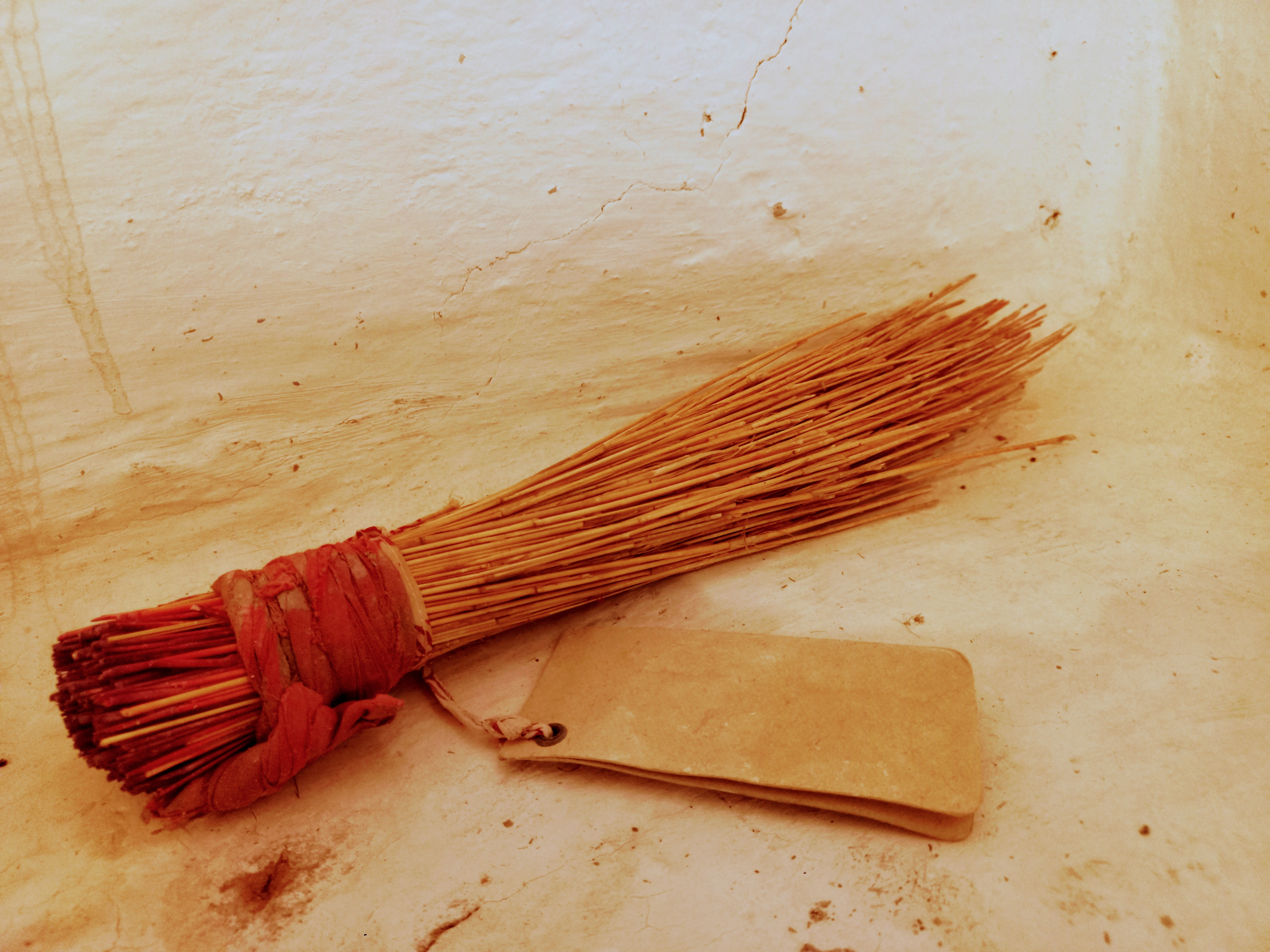
Lampana broom

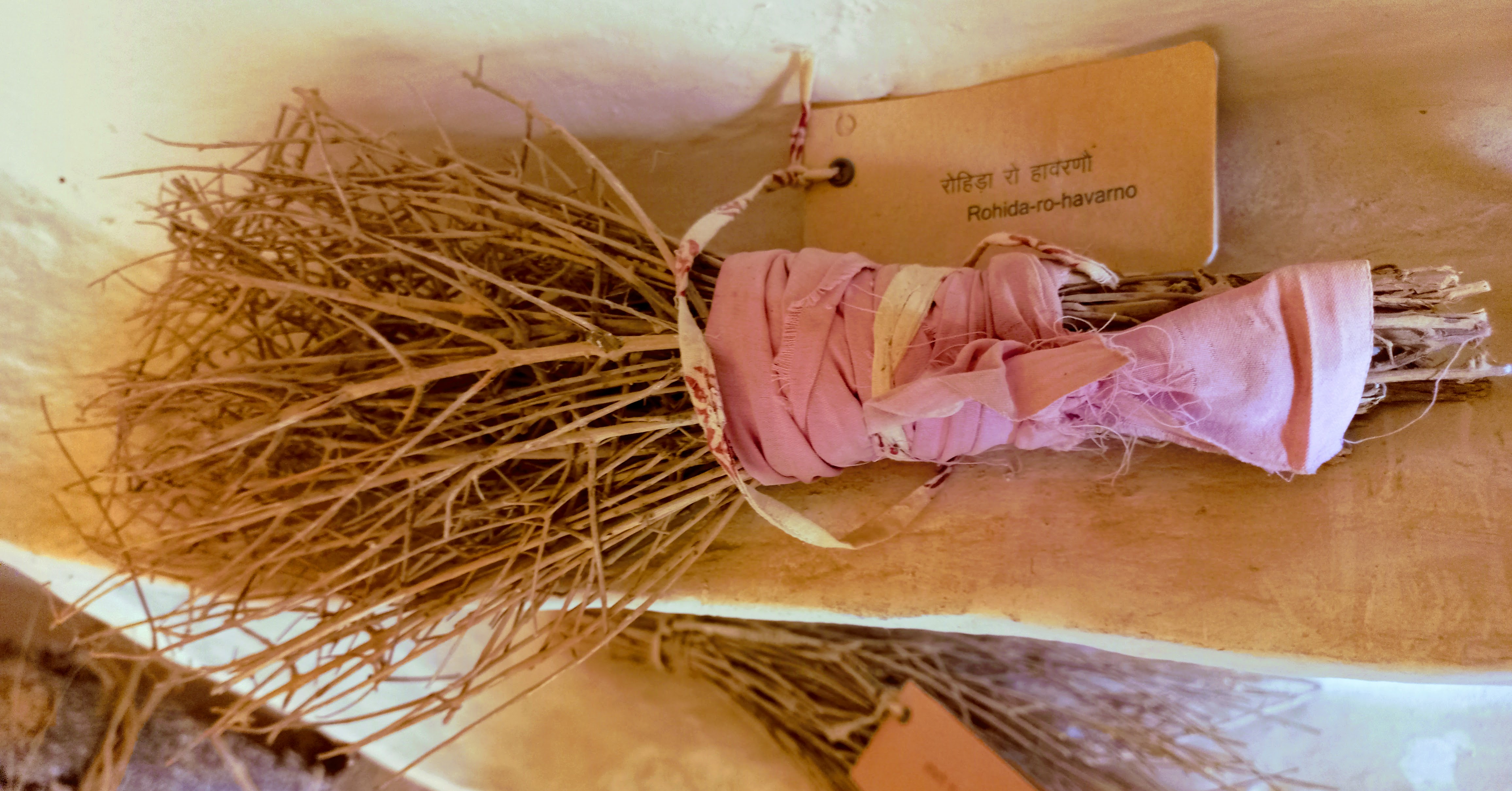
Broom made from Rohida

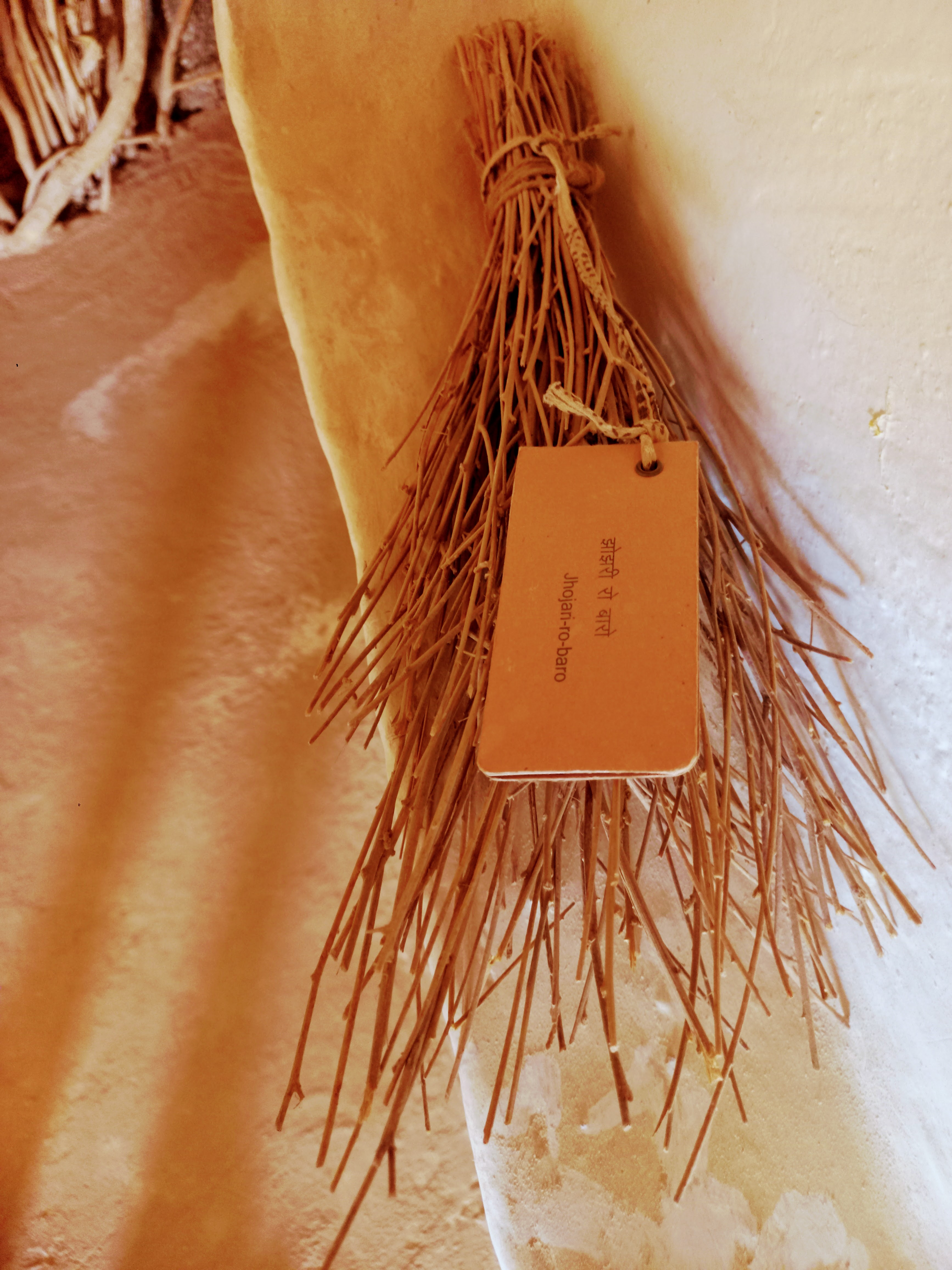
Broom of Jhojhri Grass

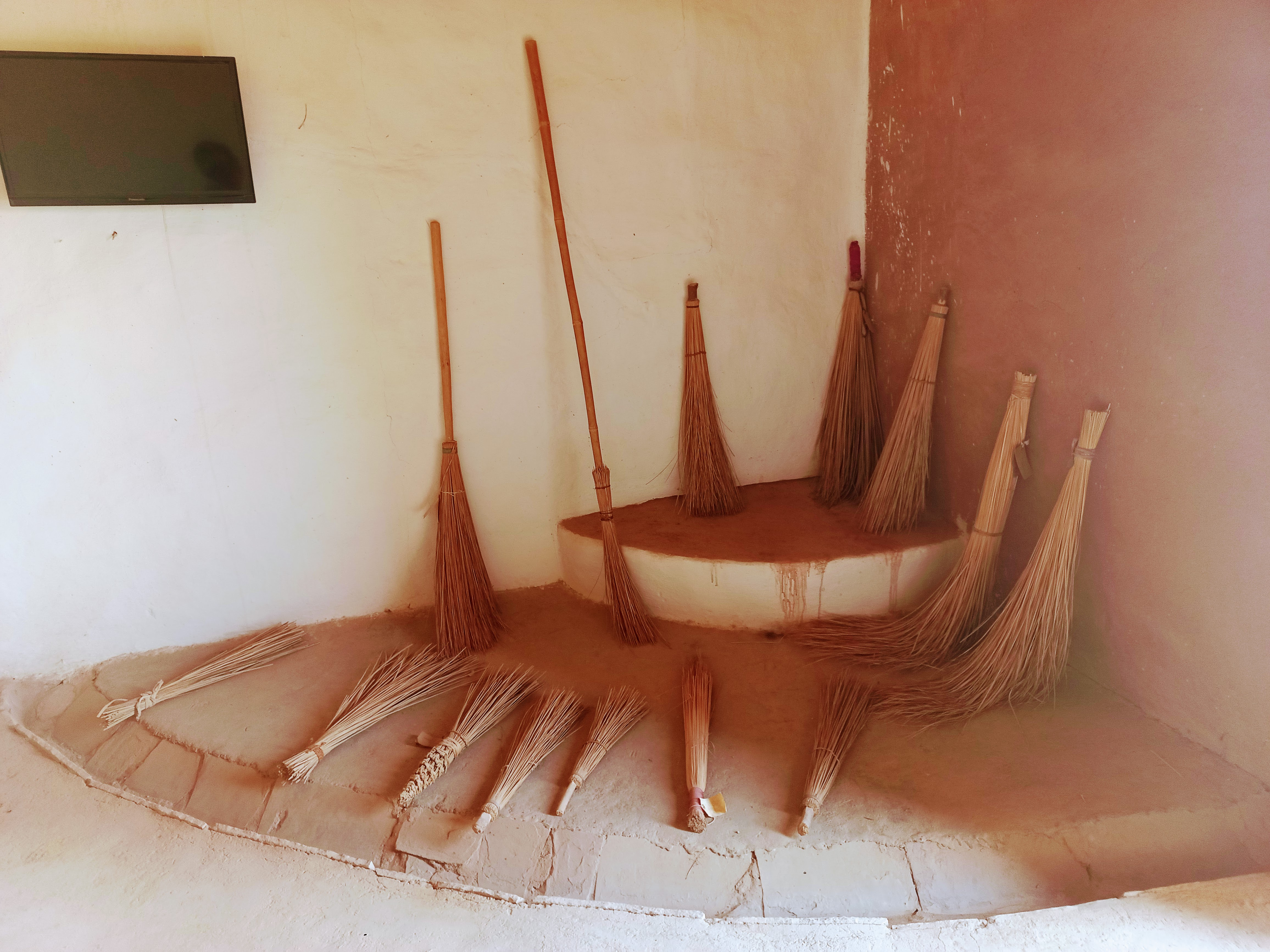
Broom Exhibit

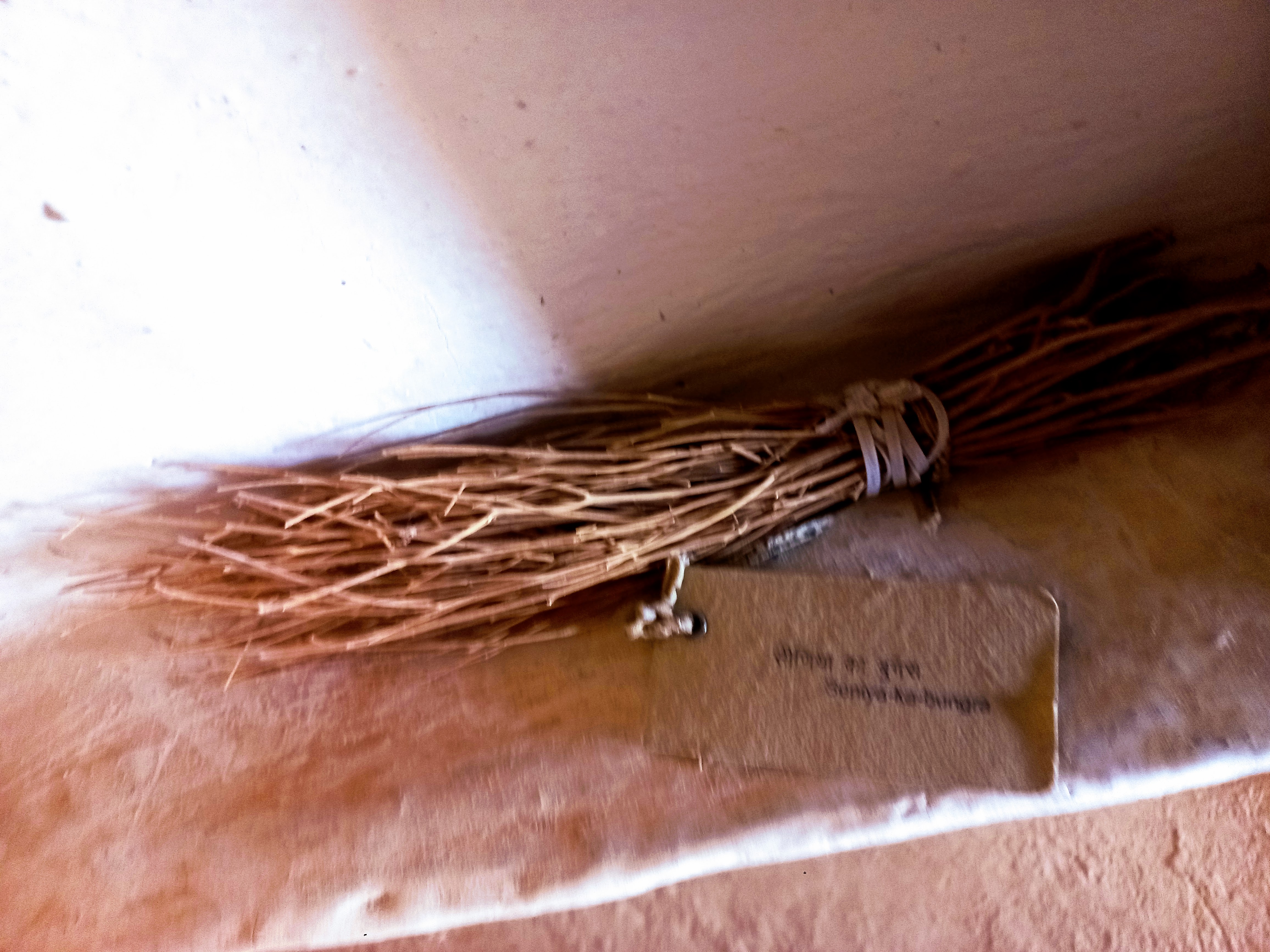
Broom Made of Seniya Grass

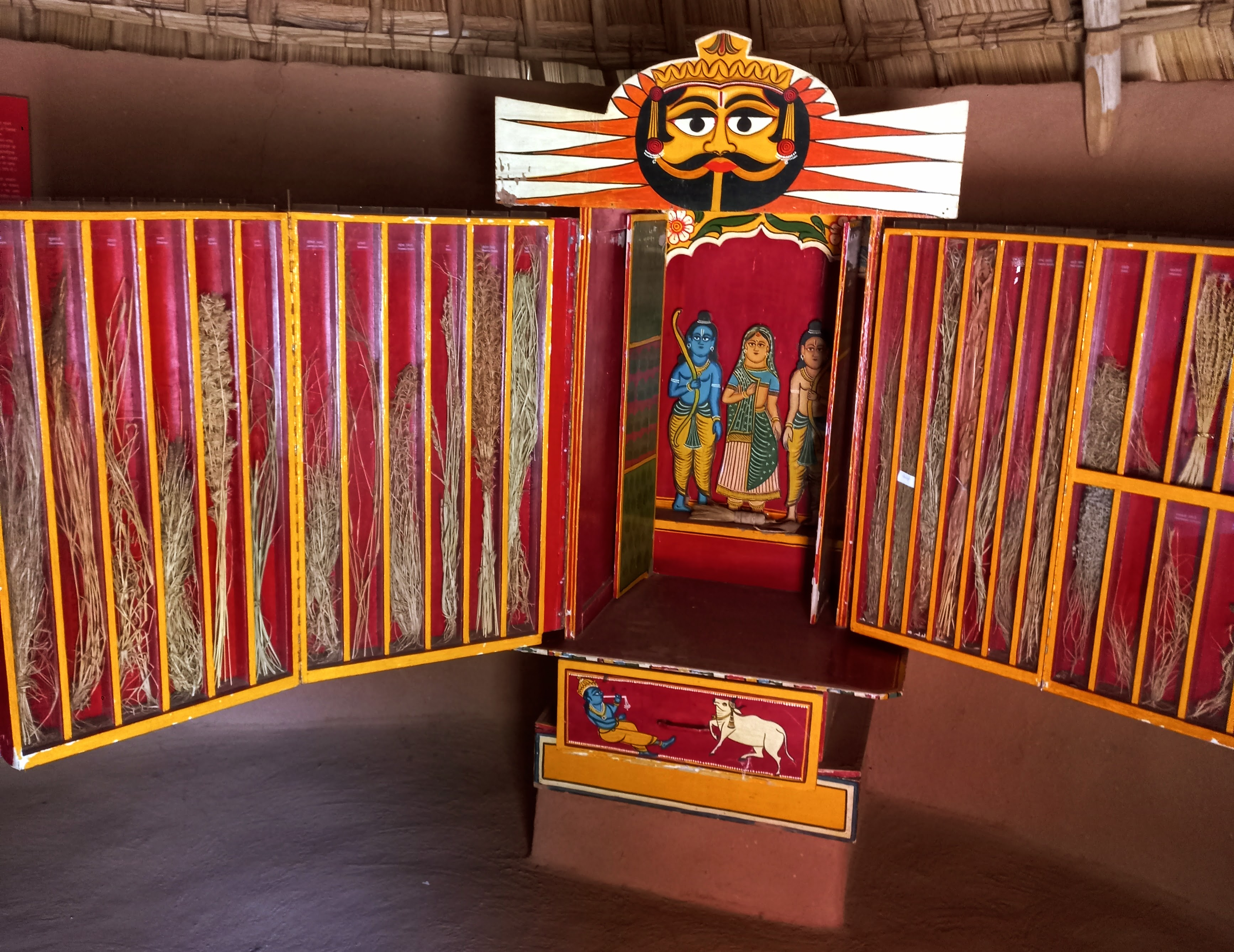
Kavad, Broom Shrine

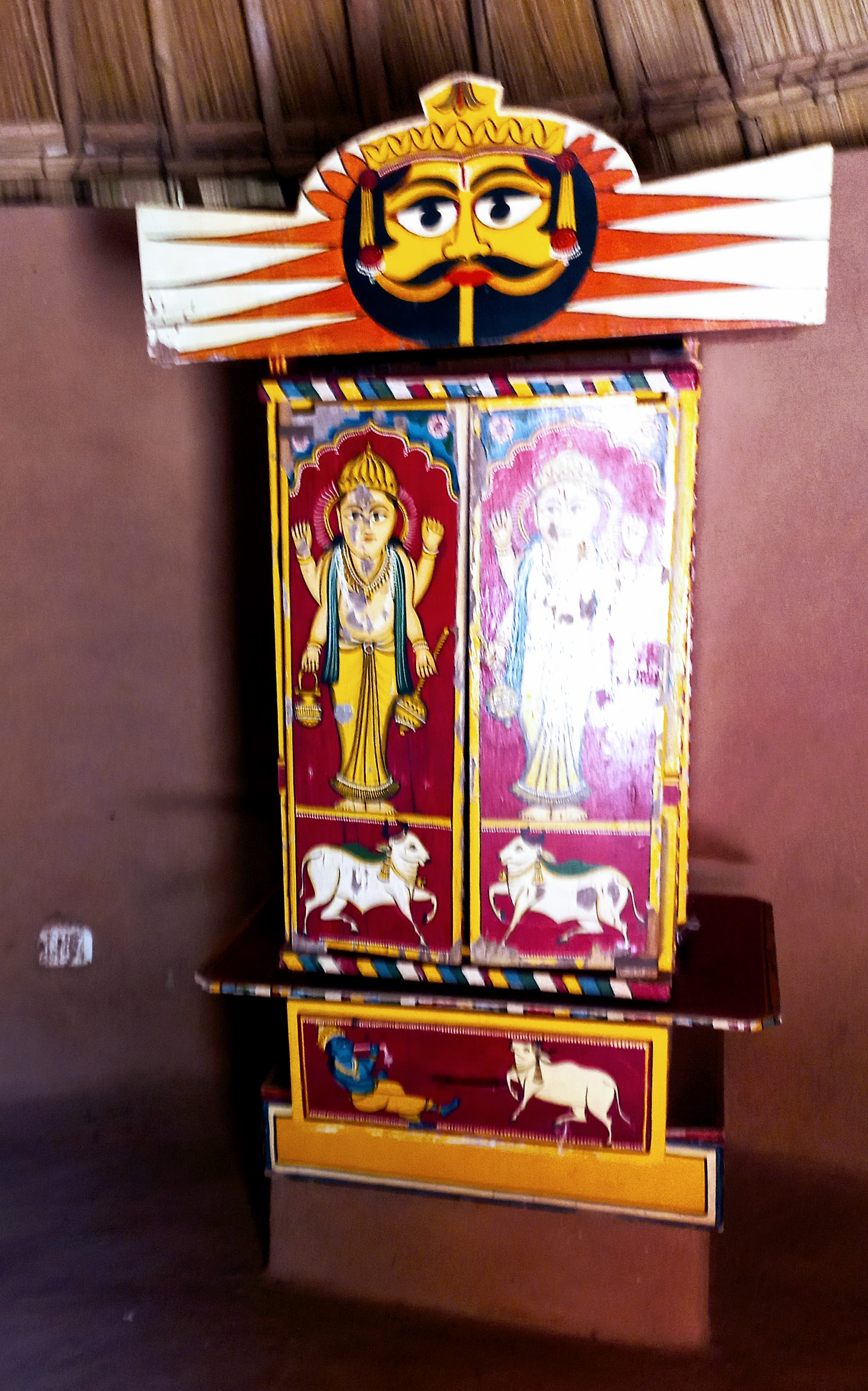
Closed Kavad

=== Folk musical instruments ===
Kothari had worked extensively with folk musician communities of western Rajasthan. He had collected many folk musical instruments that find a place in this exhibition. Kamaicha, Sarangi, Algoza, Morchang, Poongi are some of the folk instruments that are housed in the museum.

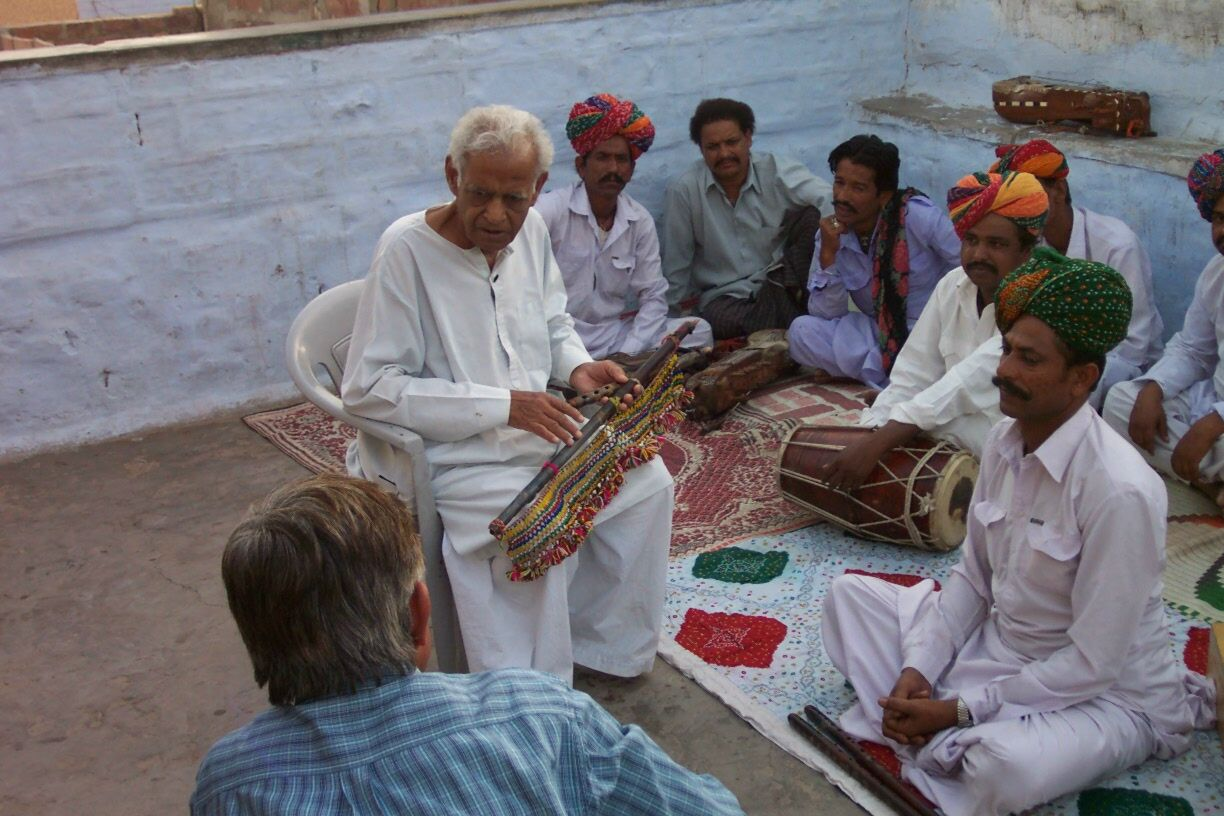
Komal Kothari with Langa Musicians

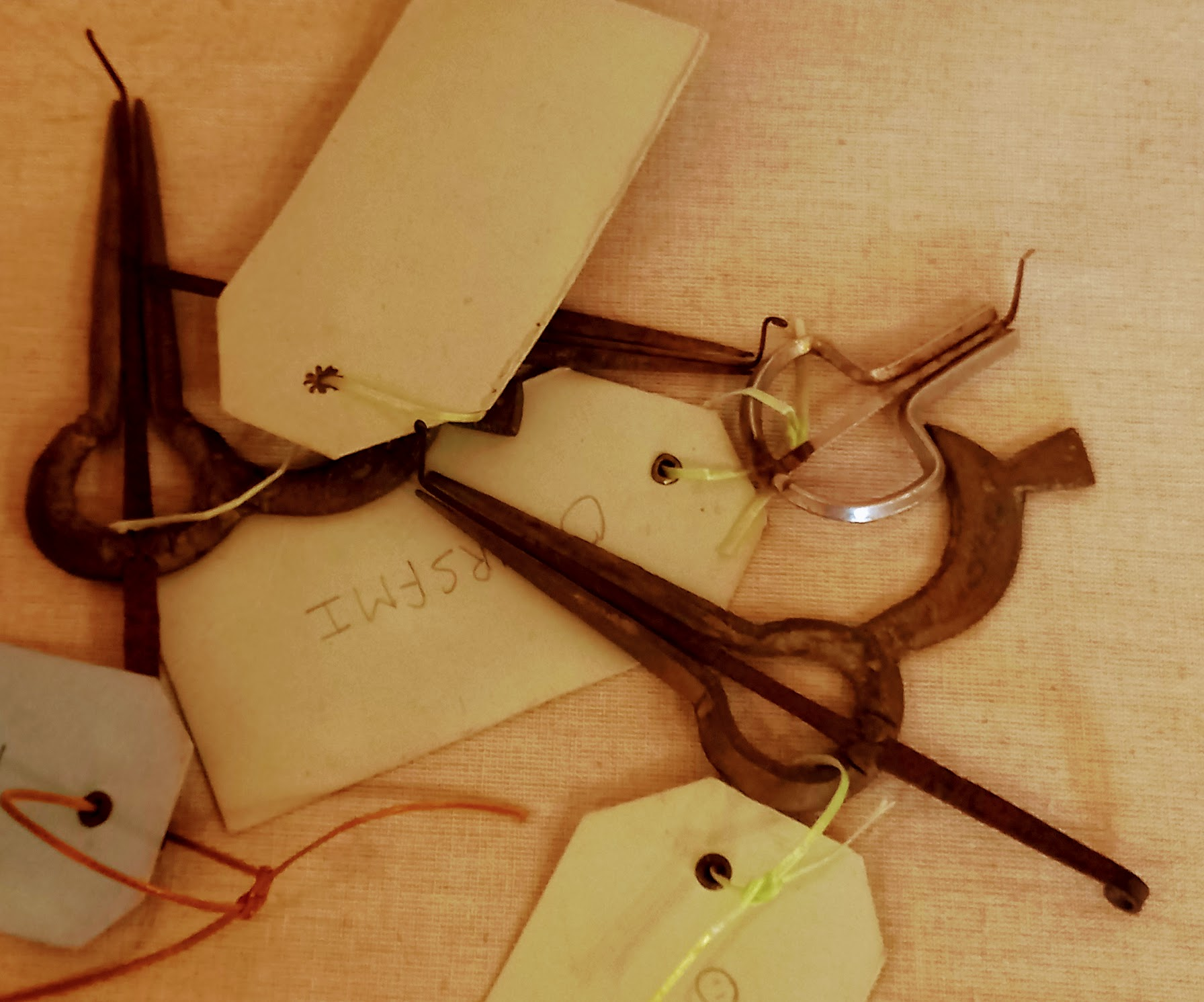
Morchang

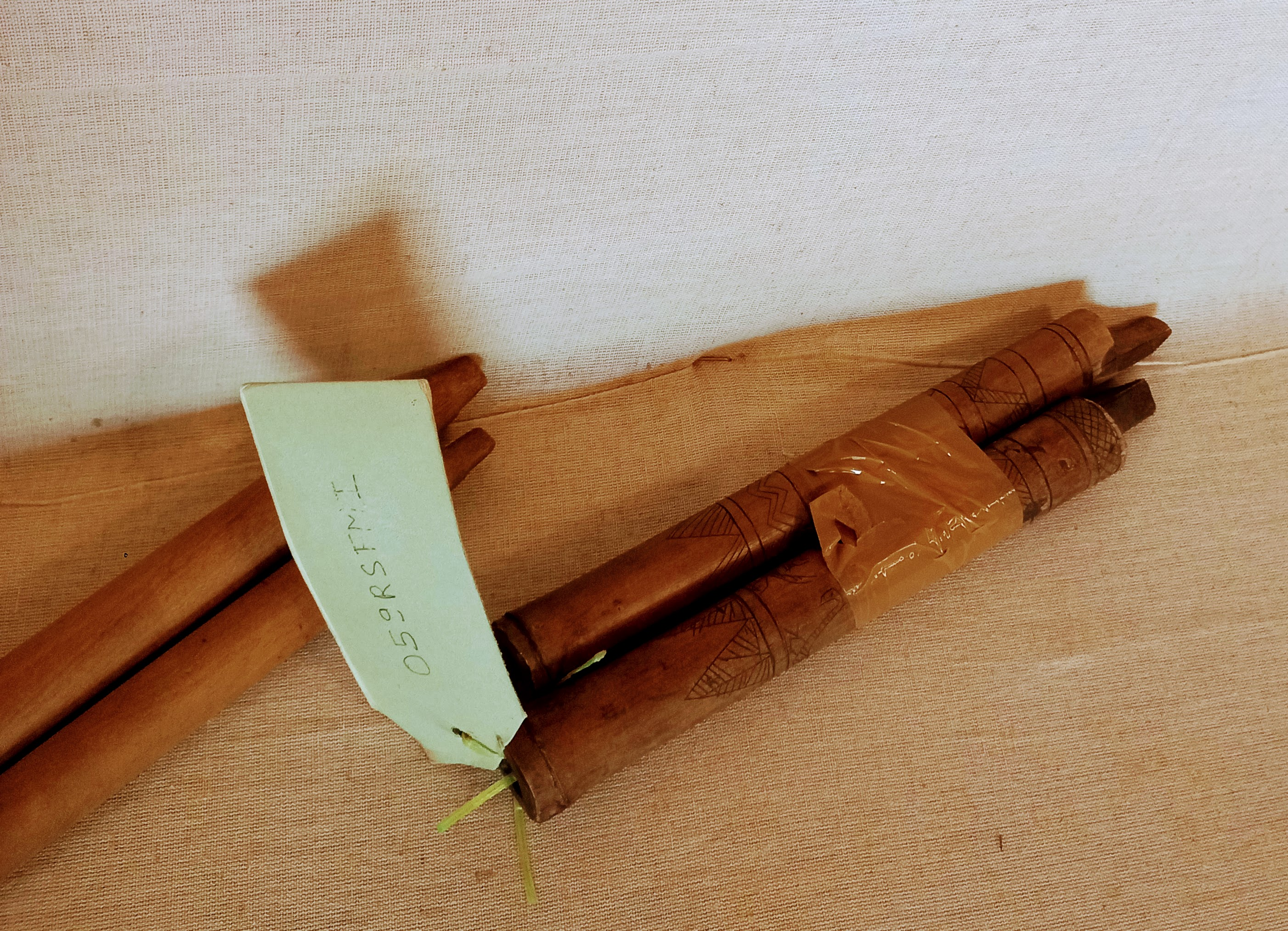
Algoja

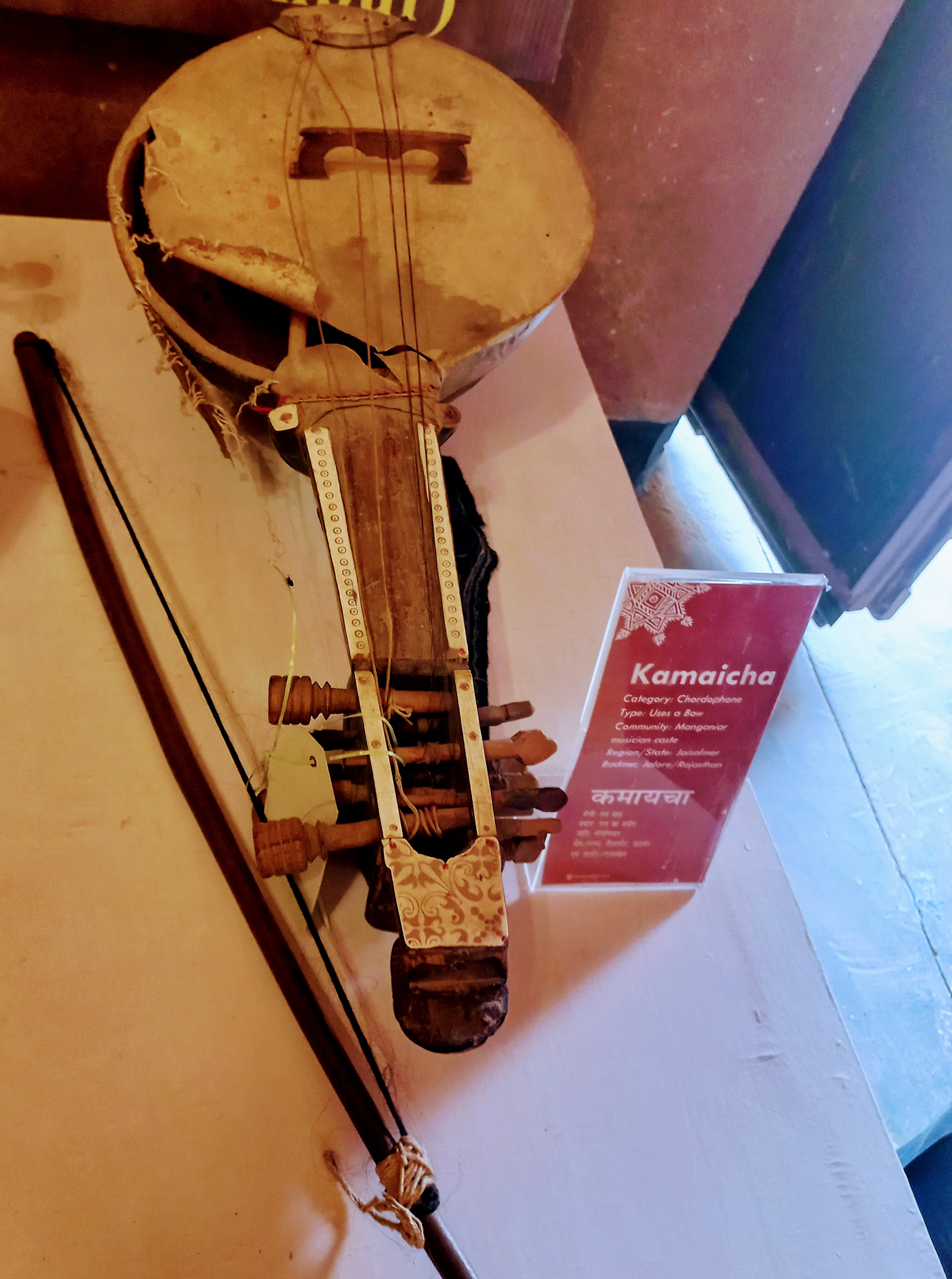
Kamaicha

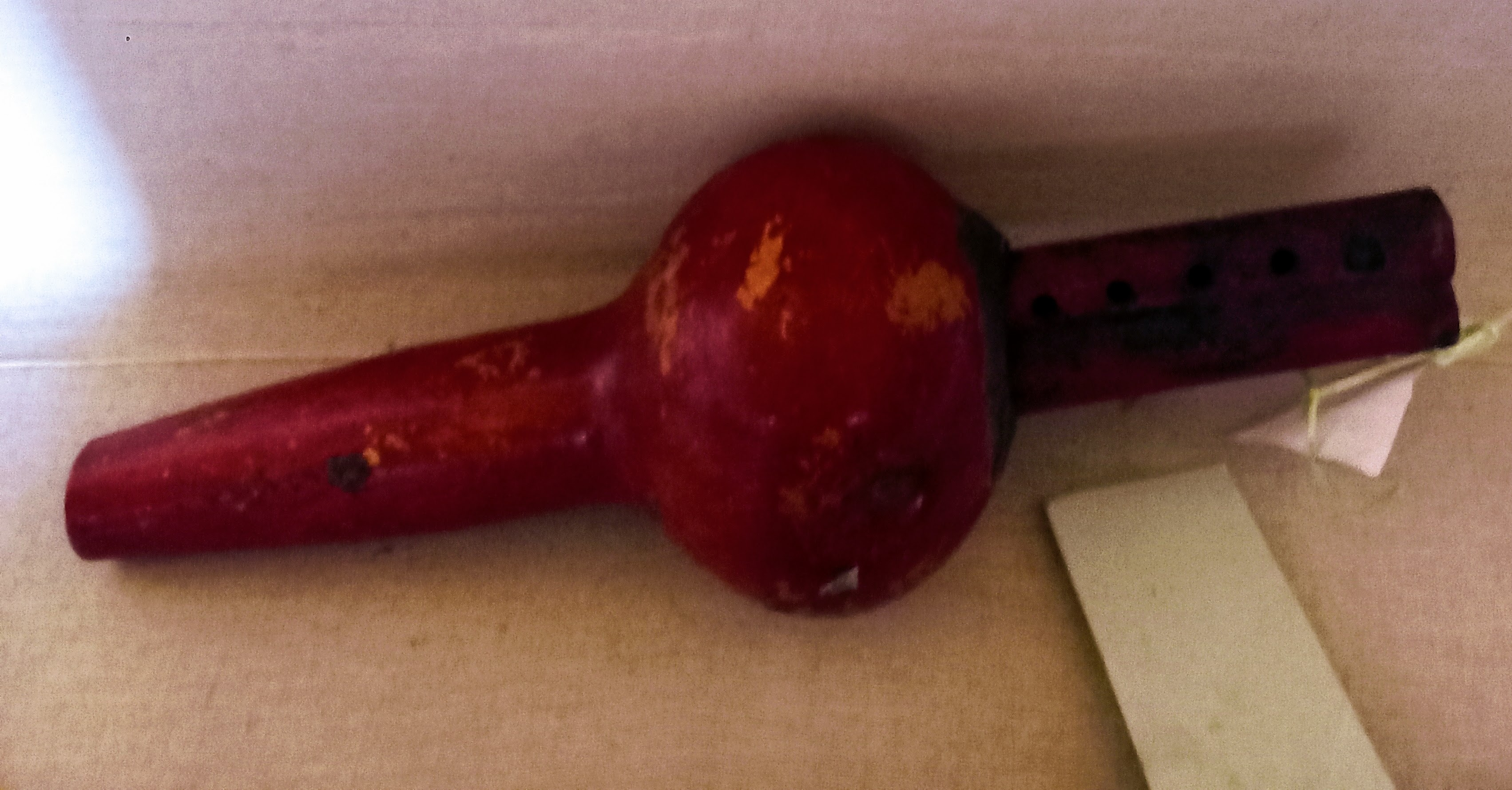
Poongi

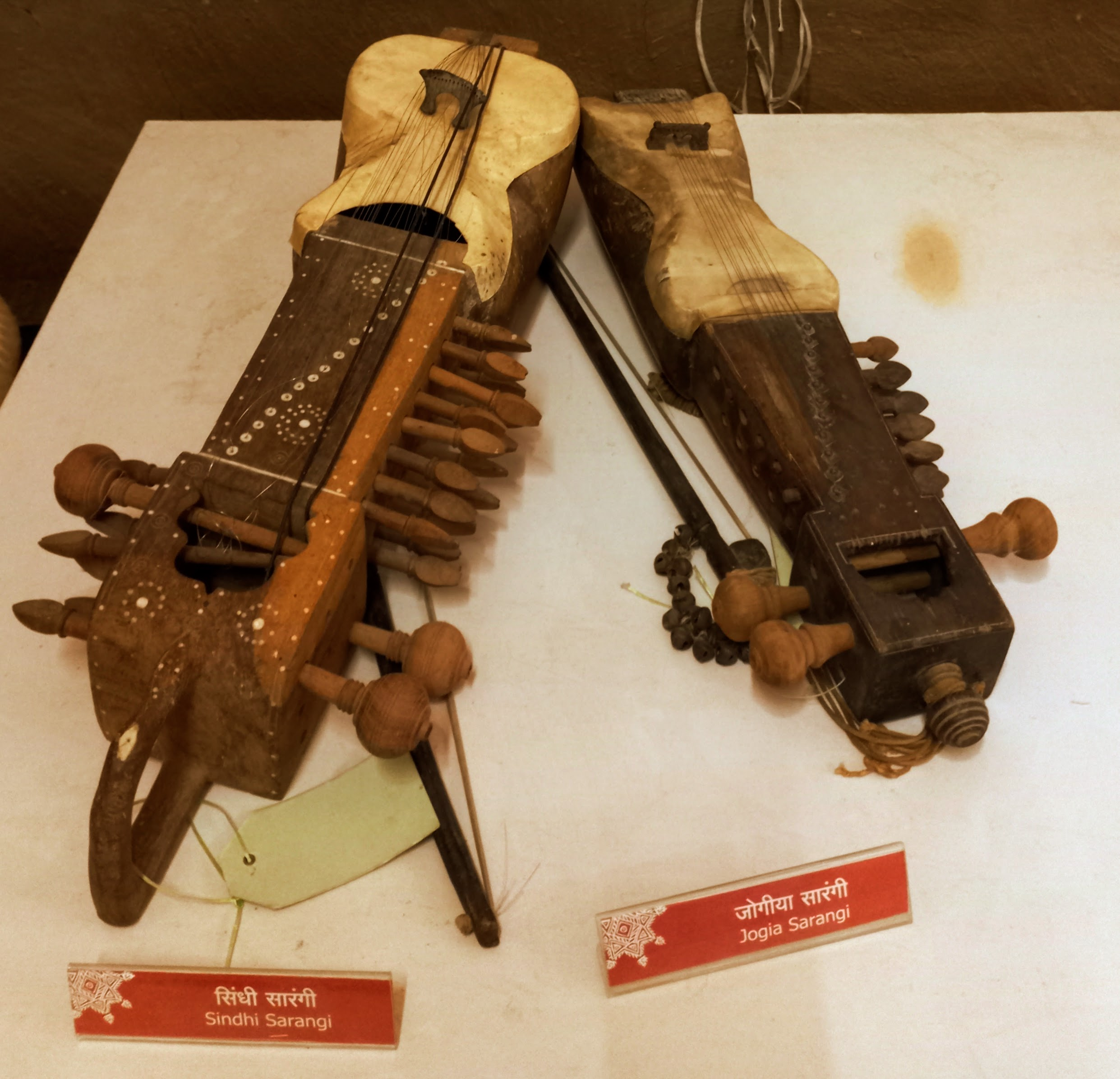
Sindhi Sarangi and Sipahi Sarangi

=== Pottery ===
Water being scarce in Thar region is an important resource for the communities. Pottery for water and food storage, and cooking were essential. Thus, skills of potter community are showcased in the museum. It has been a platform for collaboration of local artisans and design students of IIT Jodhpur to produce efficient pottery for desert region.

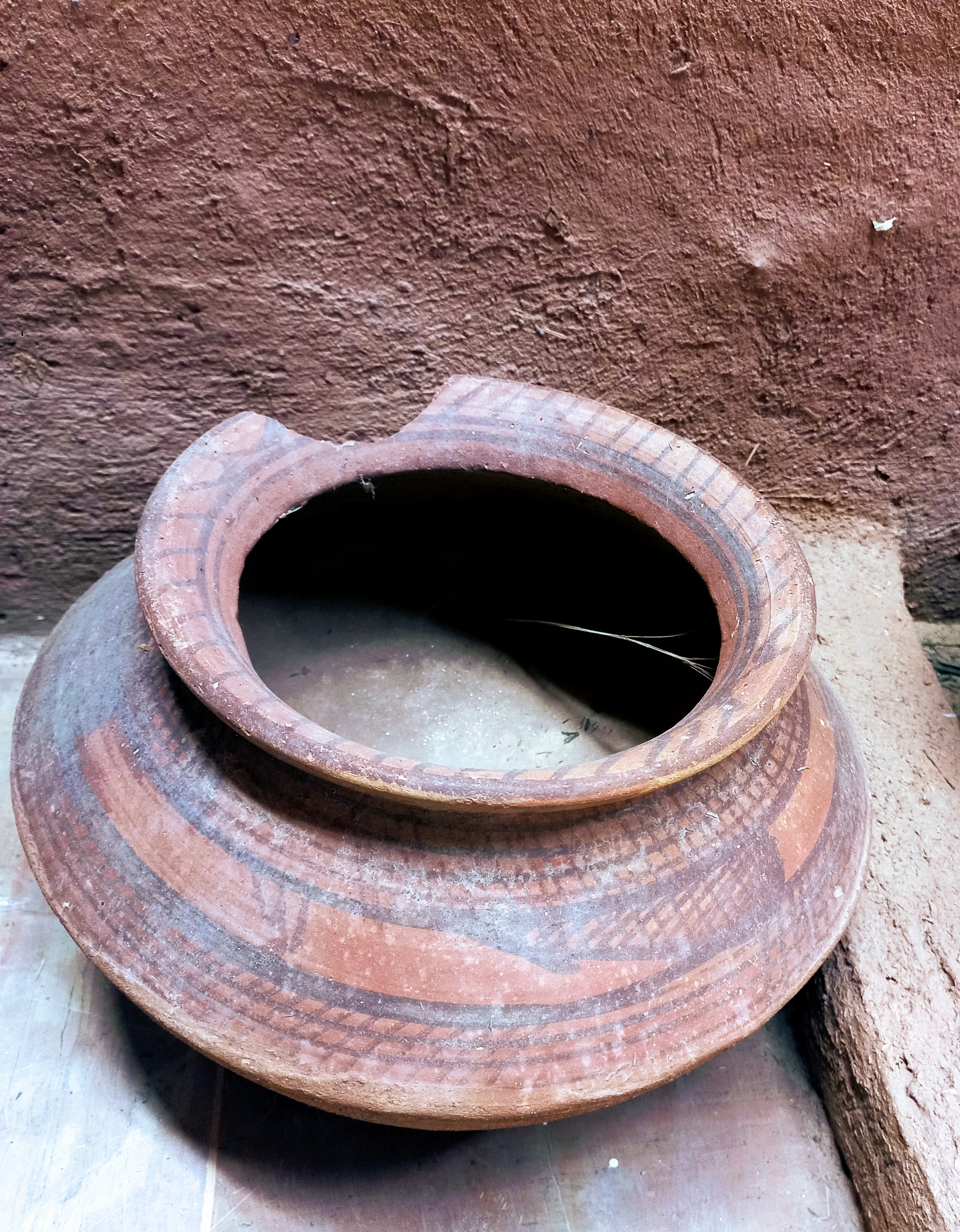
Desert pottery

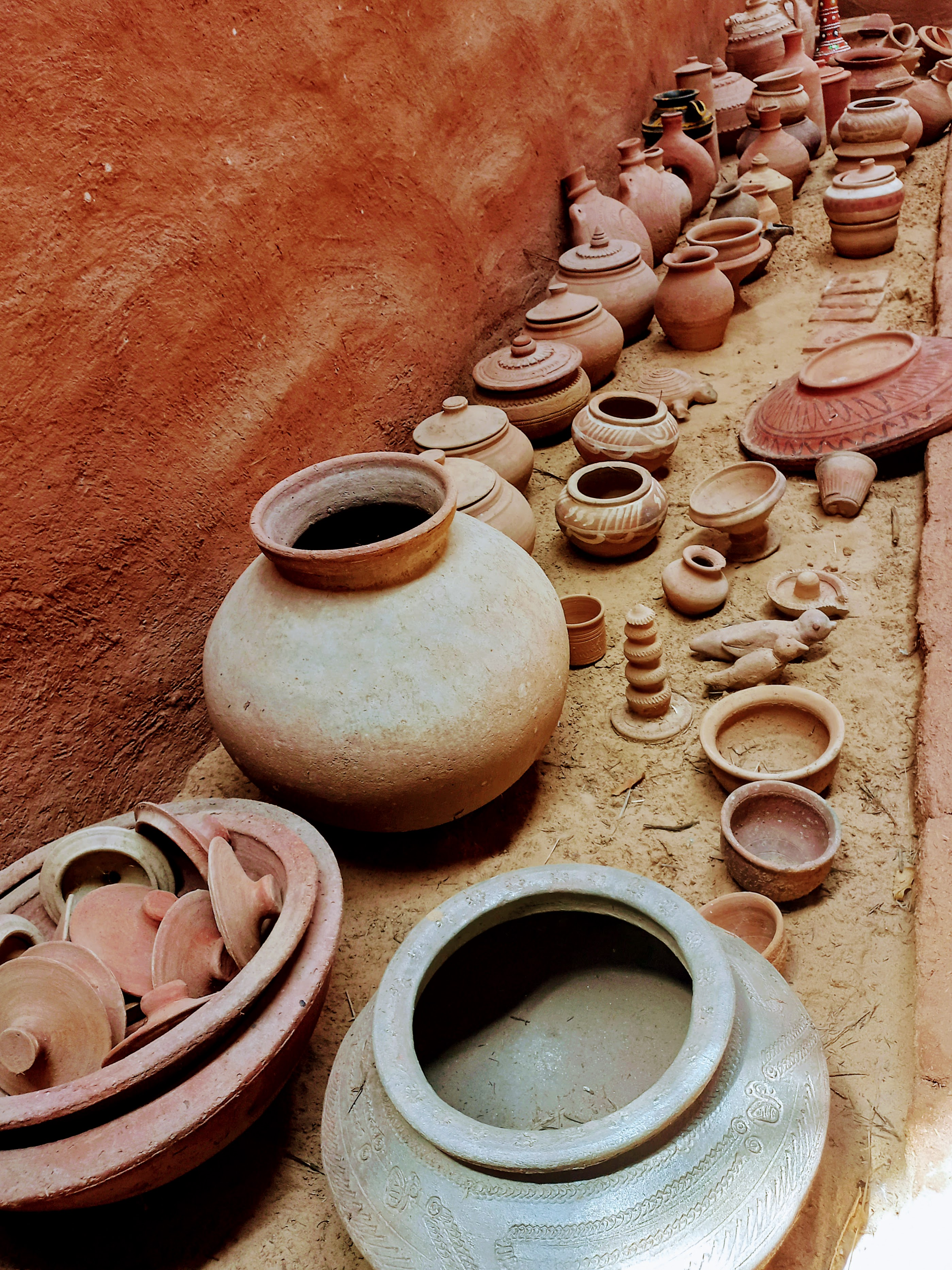
Pottery exhibition

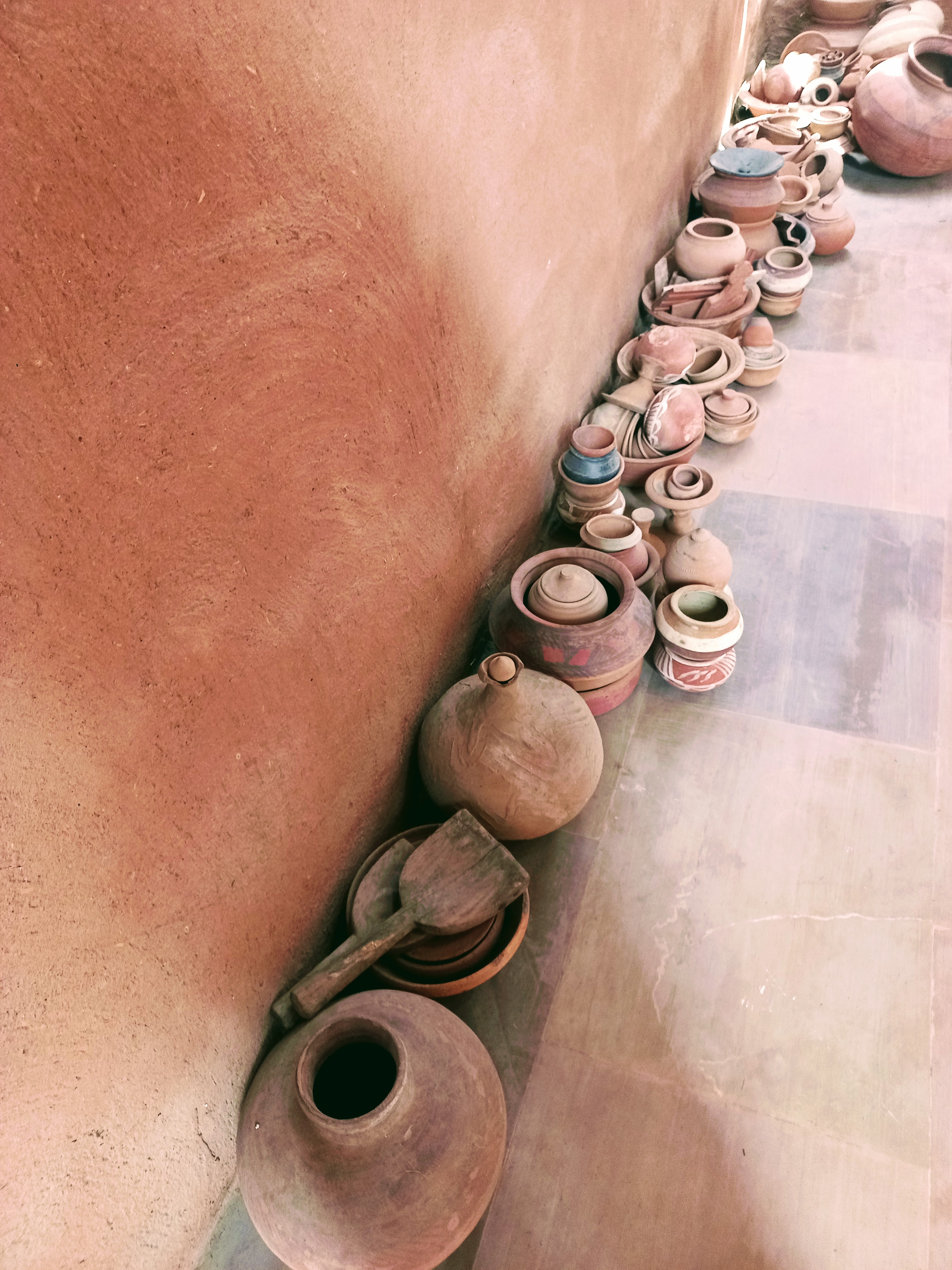
Pottery of everyday use

=== Puppetry ===
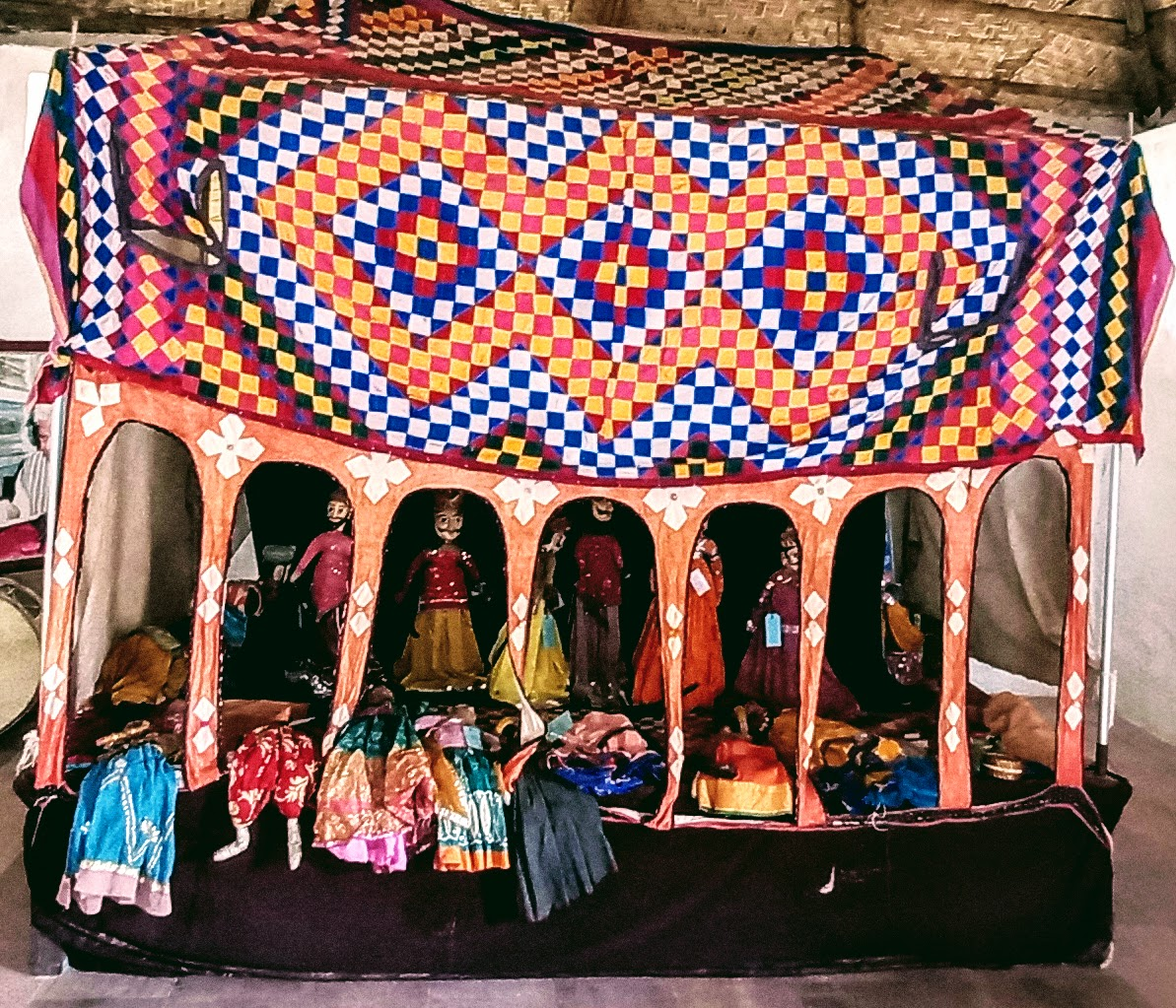
Puppetry, Arna Jharna Museum

The art of puppetry, with a flavour of folk songs and music, adds liveliness to the museum. The performing art exhibition brings the artists and the objects together.

=== Millets ===
Local knowledge, methods of production, rituals, pottery and food around millets is showcased in this new section.

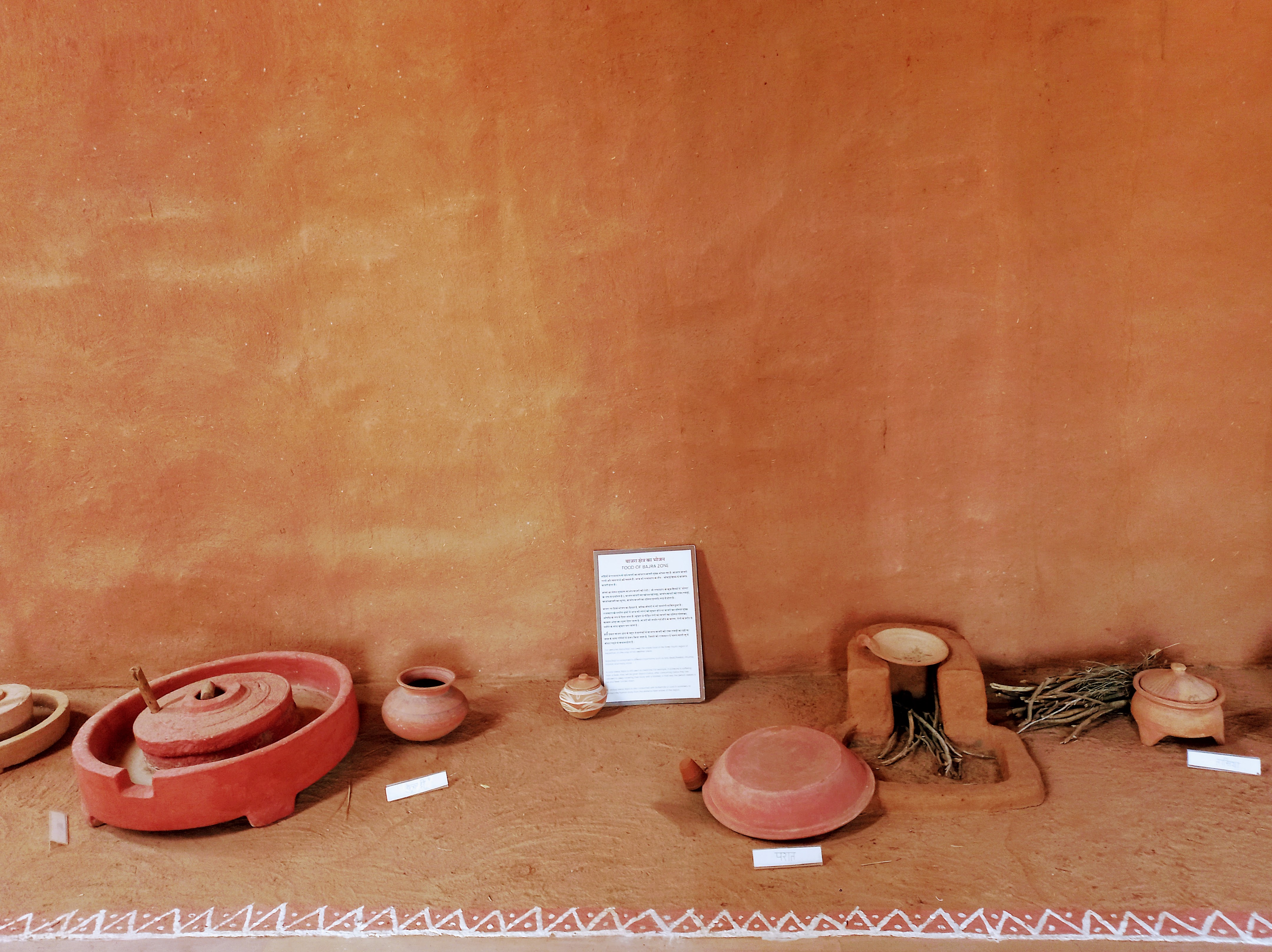
Millet Cooking

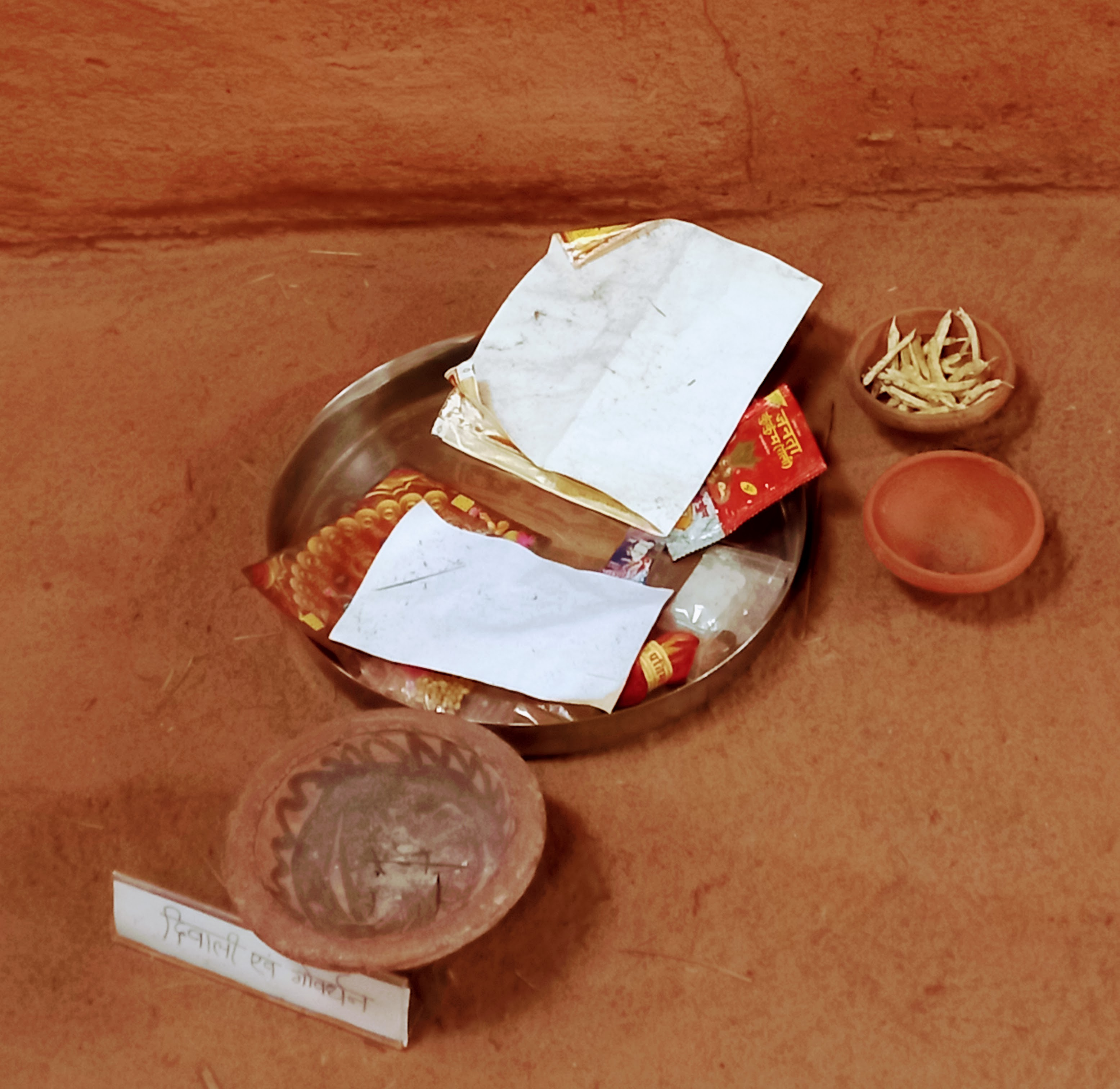
Millets in Festive Rituals

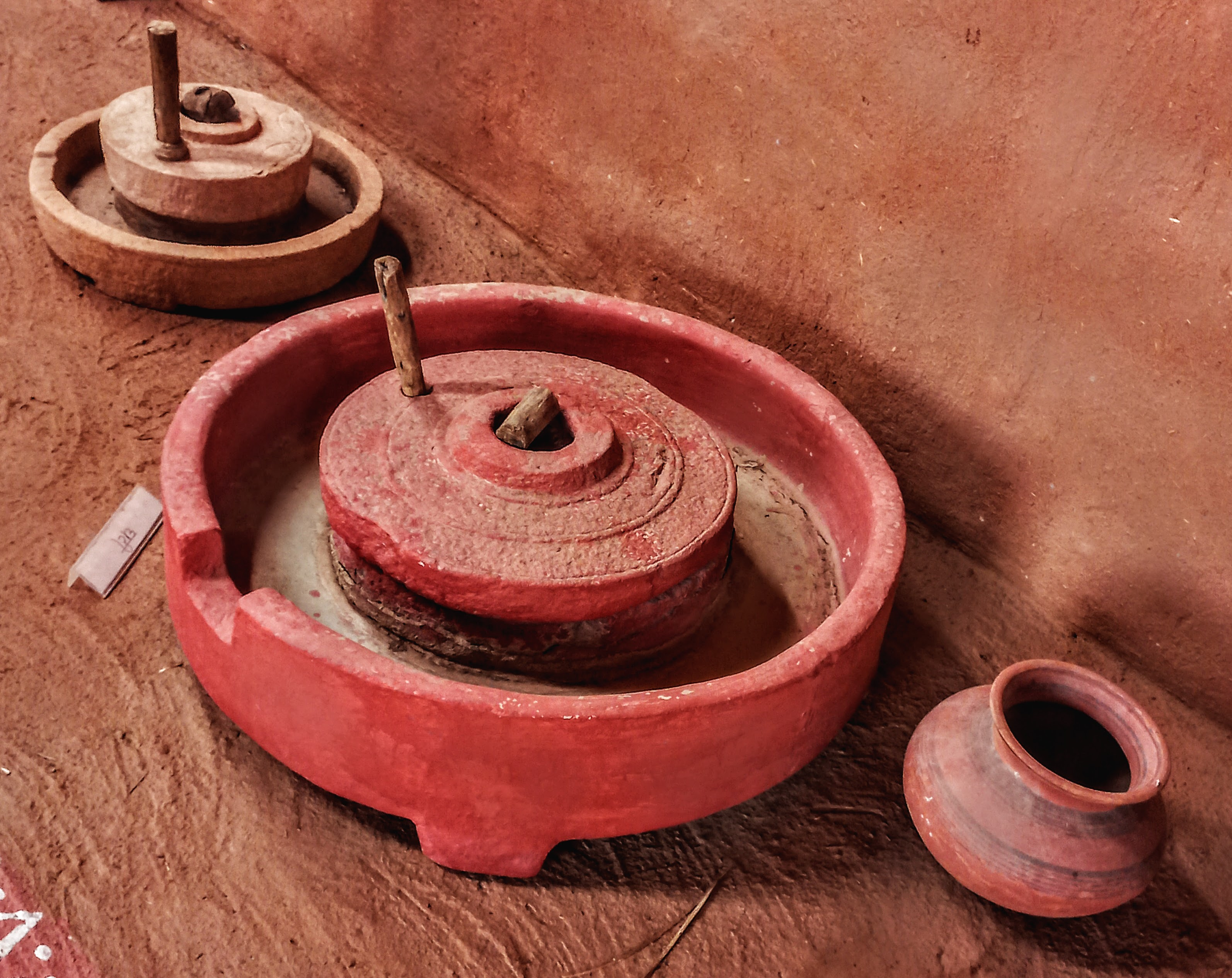
Chakki

== Activities ==
The museum organizes workshops for children. The museum also runs Komal Kothari School of Folk Music to train pupils from folk musician communities of Langas and Manganiyars.

== Awards and recognition ==
The museum was recognized by UNESCO in its document on Community Based approach to Museum Development and featured at the top of the list. It has also found a mention in the Limca Book of Records.
