= Hum Rahein Na Rahein Hum =

Indian television series

- Genre: Romance; Drama
- Based on: İstanbullu Gelin
- Written by: Sutapa Sikdar
- Starring: Tina Datta; Jay Bhanushali
- Theme music composer: Narayan Deb
- Country of origin: India
- Original language: Hindi
- No. of seasons: 1
- No. of episodes: 120

Production
- Executive producers: Gayatri Gill Tewary; Rahul Tewary
- Producer: Siddharth Kumar Tewary
- Camera setup: Multi-camera
- Production company: Swastik Productions

Original release
- Network: Sony Entertainment Television
- Release: 10 April – 22 September 2023

Hum Rahe Na Rahe Hum is an Indian romantic drama television series that aired from 10 April to 22 September 2023 on Sony TV and streamed on SonyLIV. Produced by Swastik Productions, it is an adaptation of the popular Turkish series İstanbullu Gelin. It stars Tina Datta and Jay Bhanushali.

== Plot ==
Surili Ahuja Banerjee is a care-free girl from Colaba, Mumbai. She owns and runs the Gramophone cafe ever since her parents died. Shivendra Barot is the eldest prince of Ranakgadh. Mature, dedicated, and responsible, he is tied to the traditions that his mother, Damayanti Barot- the Queen of Ranakgadh requires all her sons to follow.

== Cast ==
=== Main ===
- Tina Datta as Surili Ahuja Banerjee: Owner of Gramophone Cafe; Surjot and Lalit's daughter; Shiv's wife; Mohit's step-mother
- Jay Bhanushali as Shivendra "Shiv" Barot: Owner of Barot Industries; Prince of Ranakgad; Damayanti and Chandrabhan's son; Raghav, Maan and Sam's brother; Samar's half-brother; Surili's husband; Mohit's father

=== Recurring ===
- Kitu Gidwani as Damayanti Barot: Queen of Ranakgad; Matriarch of the Barot family; Chandrabhan's widow; Shiv, Raghav, Maan and Sam's mother
- Sujay Reu as Manvendra "Maan" Barot: A poet; Prince of Ranakgad; Damayanti and Chandrabhan's son; Shiv, Raghav and Sam's brother; Samar's half-brother
- Aabhaas Mehta as Raghavendra "Raghav" Barot: Prince of Ranakgad; Damayanti and Chandrabhan's son; Shiv, Maan and Sam's brother; Samar's half-brother; Swatilekha's husband
- Prerna Wanvari as Swatilekha "Lekha" Raizada: Madhumalati and Hariprasad's daughter; Raghav's wife
- Mohit Duseja as Samvendra "Sam" Barot: Prince of Ranakgad; Damayanti and Chandrabhan's son; Shiv, Raghav and Maan's brother; Samar's half-brother; Meethi's love-interest
- Karanvir Bohra as Samar Barot: Suchitra and Chandrabhan's son; Shiv, Raghav, Maan and Sam's half-brother
- Anita Hassanandani as Roshni Sahni: Shiv's former girlfriend; Mohit's mother
- Shaurya Sankhla as Mohit Barot: Roshni and Shiv's son; Surili's step-son
- Cheshta Bhagat as Sasha Ahuja: Pammi's daughter; Surili's cousin; Monty's former wife; Dia's mother
- Mamta Verma as Pammi Ahuja: Surjot's sister; Sasha's mother; Surili's aunt
- Pahal Chaudhary as Dia Ahuja: Sasha and Monty's daughter; Surili's niece
- Gayatri Gauri as Madhumalati Raizada: Hariprasad's wife; Lekha's mother (2023)
- Prakash Ramchandani as Hariprasad Raizada: A politician; Madhumalati's husband; Lekha's father (2023)
- Rashmi Sachdeva as Ambi Dai: Former head servant at Barot palace; Suchitra's sister; Samar's maternal aunt (2023)
- Sarvendra Singh as Veera: Damayanti's right hand; Shiv's mentor (2023)
- Aryan Singh as Monty DeCosta: A drug addict; Sasha's former husband; Dia's father (2023)
- Khushboo Panjathia / Prerna Khawas as Meethi: A servant at the Barot palace; Sam's love-interest
- Sapan Gulati as Bandish: Shiv's assistant and manager at Barot Industries
- Jasneet Kaur Kant as Guni: A servant at the Barot palace, who could see the future and warn the queen
- Rushi Mistry as Zubin "Zuzu" Nariman: Parinaz's widower; Parvez's father; Surili's neighbor and well-wisher
- Shankar Bhejel as Moddu: a student and part-time worker at Surili's cafe
- Shankar as Jigushu Chikalia: Governor of Gujarat
- Sonal as Surjot Ahuja Banerjee: Pammi's sister; Lalit's wife; Surili's mother
- Rajat as Lalit Banerjee: Surjot's husband; Surili's father
- Dhananjay Shah as Murad Chacha: Artefact fixer in Purani Gali
- Raju as Mr. Talwar: a businessman; Shivendra's former contract partner
- ActorsFirdaush as Arnav
- Akash as Parvez Nariman: Zubin and Parinaz's son; Surili's former land lord
- Sahiba as Parinaz Nariman: Zubin's wife; Parvez's mother

== Production ==
=== Development ===
Hum Rahe Na Rahe Hum is an adaptation of popular Turkish series İstanbullu Gelin, also known as Bride of Istanbul. Announced by Swastik Productions in March 2023, it was initially rumoured to be titled Mere Apne.

=== Casting ===
Tina Datta, Jay Bhanushali and Kitu Gidwani were cast as Surili Ahuja Banerjee, Shivendra Barot and Damayanti Barot. The show is Datta and Bhanushali's first collaboration in fiction. The two previously participated in the same season of the stunt reality series Fear Factor: Khatron Ke Khiladi 7.

Datta said yes to the show because she related to the character of Surili who is a modern-day girl from Colaba. She revealed there are a lot of similarities between Surili and herself which made her connect to the character.

Bhanushali returned to a fiction television show after more than a decade. Similarly, Gidwani returned to a daily fiction show after about two decades. She signed Hum Rahe Na Rahe Hum because she found her role interesting, unique and strong to play. In May 2023, Karanvir Bohra was cast as Samar Ahluwalia Barot.

He said he loved the shades of the character which is why he said yes to it. In July 2023, Anita Hassanandani was cast as Roshni.

=== Filming ===
The series is set in Mumbai and the fictional town of Ranakgadh. Filming began in March 2023 and the sets are based in Film City as well as Umargam, Gujarat.

=== Release ===
The first promo of the series released on 10 March 2023 and the featured the protagonists. The second promo of Hum Rahe Na Rahe Hum released on 14 March. The promos were well received by the audience, and media.

Datta, Bhanushali and Gidwani appeared on the finale of Indian Idol 13 to promote the show.

== Reception ==
Sukarna Mondal of The Times of India praised the series for its fresh pairing and interesting storyline.

== See also ==
- List of programs broadcast by Sony Entertainment Television
