= Tina Datta =

Indian actress (born 1991)

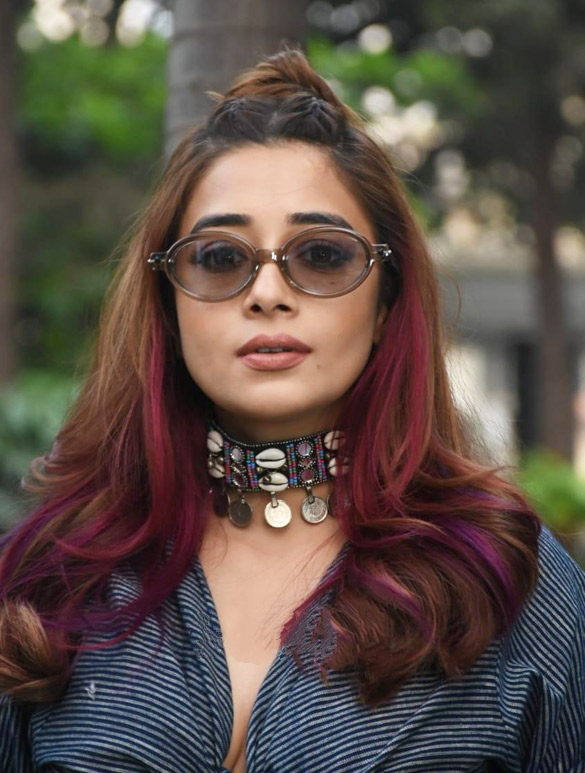
- Datta in 2023
- Born: 27 November 1991 (age 34); Kolkata, West Bengal, India
- Education: Meghmala Roy Education Center; St. Paul's Boarding and Day School
- Occupation: Actress
- Years active: 1996–present
- Known for: Uttaran; Bigg Boss 16

Tina Datta (pronounced [ˈʈina ˈɖɔʈʈa]; born 27 November 1991) is an Indian actress known primarily for her work in Hindi television. Datta rose to fame with her portrayal of Ichcha Singh Bundela in Uttaran. She also participated in Khatron Ke Khiladi 7 and Bigg Boss 16.

== Personal life ==
Datta was born in Kolkata on 27 November 1991 to Madhumita Datta and Tapan Datta. She has an elder brother named Debraj.

She's an avid yoga and pilates enthusiast. During the COVID-19 lockdown, she decided to switch her routine from functional weight training to yoga. Additionally, the actress is well versed in pole dancing and kickboxing.

== Career ==
=== Child artist and early roles (1996–2008) ===
Datta made her debut at the age of five with the show Sister Nivedita. A year later, she made her film debut as a child artist with the Bengali film Pita Maata Santan. She went on to act in many Bengali films some of which are Dus Number Bari and Sagarkanya. She has also acted in several Bengali television series one of which being Khela. Datta starred in Rituparno Ghosh's film Chokher Bali alongside Aishwarya Rai. She further played young Lalita in Vidya Balan and Saif Ali Khan's 2005 cult movie Parineeta. Datta auditioned for the role of in Kolkata and Pradeep Sarkar, who was looking for a Bengali face to play the role really liked her and said she was perfect for the role. In 2008, she starred in the Bengali mythology drama television series Durga where she played Kumkum Roy Choudhary.

=== Breakthrough and recognition (2009–2021) ===
From 2009 to 2015, Datta starred as Ichcha Bundela and Meethi Bundela opposite Nandish Sandhu and Mrunal Jain in Uttaran, the third longest-running Indian television series of Colors TV. Her performance earned her widespread acclaim and several accolades including the Producers Guild Award for Best Actress in a Drama Series.

In 2016, she participated in Colors TV's stunt-based reality show Fear Factor: Khatron Ke Khiladi 7 where she finished at the 12th position. From 2017 to 2018, Datta played Dhamini in the mythology drama Karmaphal Daata Shani. From 2018 to 2019, she portrayed Jhanvi Mourya and Kundani Roy in &TV's paranormal romance drama series Daayan.

In 2020, she played Ketki Maheshwari opposite Rajeev Khandelwal in ZEE5's crime thriller web series Naxalbari which revolves around an STF agent who goes on a mission to suppress the revival of a Naxal uprising in Gadchiroli. She won the Global Fame Award for Best OTT Debut for her portrayal in the series. In 2021, Datta made her music video debut by starring in Mika Singh's Bengali song Durga Maa Elo Re.

=== Bigg Boss and further work (2022–present) ===
From 2022 to 2023, she participated in Colors TV's captive reality show Bigg Boss 16. She finished at the eighth place after spending 119 days in the house. Datta was the second highest paid contestant of the season. In 2023, she portrayed Surili Ahuja Banerjee in Sony TV's Hum Rahe Na Rahe Hum opposite Jay Bhanushali.

== Media image ==
Datta was ranked 19th in Times of India's Most Desirable Women on Television List 2019.

In 2023, Datta walked as a showstopper for Shivayu at Jaipur Couture Week and Eunoia at the Pune Times Fashion Week.

== Filmography ==
=== Films ===
Year	Title	Role	Language	Ref.
1997	Pita Maata Santan	Child artist	Bengali	
2003	Tharak	Child artist	Bengali	
2003	Chokher Bali	Manorama	Bengali	
2005	Parineeta	Young Lalita Roy	Hindi	
2008	Chirodini Tumi Je Amar	Priyanka	Bengali	

=== Television ===
Year	Title	Role	Notes	Ref.
1994	Sister Nivedita		Child Artist	
2007	Khela	Hiya / Saira		
2008	Durga	Kumkum Roy Choudhary	Bengali Debut	
2008	I Laugh You	Herself	Contestant	
2009	Koi Aane Ko Hai	Paromita Roy	Hindi Debut	
2009–2013	Uttaran	Ichcha Veer Singh Bundela		
2012-2015	Uttaran	Meethi Akash Chatterjee		
2010	Aahat	Alisha	Season 4, Episodes 41 and 42 — Episodic Role	
2016	Fear Factor: Khatron Ke Khiladi 7	Contestant	12th place	
2017–2018	Karmaphal Daata Shani	Dhamini		
2018–2019	Daayan	Jhanvi Mourya / Kundani Roy		
2022–2023	Bigg Boss 16	Contestant	8th place	
2023	Hum Rahe Na Rahe Hum	Surili Ahuja Banerjee		

==== Special appearances ====
Year	Title	Role	Notes
2009	Comedy Circus	Herself	
2009	Bigg Boss 3	Herself	
2010	Bigg Boss 4	Herself	
2011	Bigg Boss 5	Herself	
2012	Bigg Boss 6	Herself	
2013	Comedy Nights with Kapil	Herself	
2013	Bigg Boss 7	Herself	
2014	Bigg Boss 8	Herself	
2015	Comedy Classes	Herself	
2016	Comedy Nights Bachao	Herself	
2021	Bigg Boss 14	Herself	

=== Music videos ===
2021	Durga Maa Elo Re	Mika Singh, Anuradha Juju

=== Web series ===
- 2020: Naxalbari
- 2024: Personal Trainer
- 2026 : Personal Trainer 2

== Awards and nominations ==
Year	Awards	Category	Work	Result	Ref.
2009	Indian Telly Awards	Best Actress in a Lead Role	Uttaran	Nominated	
2010	Indian Telly Awards	Best Actress in a Lead Role	Uttaran	Nominated	
2010	Producers Guild Film Awards	Best Actress in a Drama Series	Uttaran	Won	
2019	Global Fame OTT Awards	Best Debut in OTT	Naxalbari	Won	
2023	Lions Gold Awards	Most Stylish Television Star (Female)	N/A	Won	
2023	Iconic Gold Awards	Best Dressed Reality Star of the Year	Bigg Boss 16	Won	
