= Prerna =

Prerna or Prerana is a Hindi/Sanskrit word which is derived from word "Prernah". Its translation is inspiration.

It is a very popular girl name in Nepal, prevalent in Hinduism.

Notable people with the name include:

- Prerna Bhambri (born 1992), Indian tennis player
- Prerana Deshpande, Indian dancer
- Prerna Gupta (born 1981/82), American social entrepreneur
- Prerana Issar, British public servant
- Prerna Kohli (born 1965), Indian clinical psychologist, social worker and author
- Prerna Lal (born 1984), Fijian-American activist
- Princess Prerana of Nepal, only daughter of King Gyanendra and Queen Komal
- Prerana Reddy, American activist
- Prerana Shrimali, Indian dancer
- Prerna Singh Bindra, Indian journalist and writer
- Prerna Wanvari, Indian actress

The name Prerna is the 68598th most popular baby name at mybabyname.com placing it in the top 95% of names by popularity.
