= Koi Aane Ko Hai =

Indian supernatural drama television series

- Genre: Supernatural; Horror
- Created by: Ekta Kapoor
- Developed by: Ekta Kapoor
- Screenplay by: Bandana Tiwari; Vikas Tiwari; Dialogues; Vinod Singh
- Story by: Sonali Jaffar; Tanushri Dasgupta
- Directed by: Santram Varma
- Starring: See below
- Opening theme: Kabir Singh
- Country of origin: India
- Original language: Hindi
- No. of seasons: 1
- No. of episodes: 52

Production
- Producers: Ekta Kapoor; Shobha Kapoor
- Editors: Sanjeev Shukla; Joydeep Nath
- Camera setup: Multi-camera
- Production company: Balaji Telefilms

Original release
- Network: Colors
- Release: 13 March – 2 October 2009

Koi Aane Ko Hai (transl. Someone is about to Come) is an Indian supernatural drama television series that premiered on 13 March 2009 on Colors TV. The series is co-produced by Ekta Kapoor and Shobha Kapoor under their banner Balaji Telefilms.

== Plot ==
The series revolves around the tales of alleged supernatural occurrences in the city that involves around various haunted houses, ghouls and the undead.

== Cast ==
- Raj Singh Arora
- Pooja Gor as Pooja
- Leena Jumani as Suhasi
- Tina Datta as Paromita Roy
- Jaya Bhattacharya as Amari Roy
- Prerna Wanvari as Neelam & Ratna ( Double Role )
- Vinod Singh as
- Prarthana Behere as
- Yash Dasgupta as Debu
- Neetha Shetty
- Rashmi Desai as Shivani, episode: Charitra
- Chaitanya Choudhry as Rahul, episode: Charitra
- Geetanjali Mishra as Meera, episode: Charitra
- Rohit Bakshi as Vanraj the ghost/ Meera's husband, episode: Charitra
- Ritu Chaudhary as Ambika, Animesh's wife & Niharika's mother
- Gavie Chahal as Animesh, Ambika's husband & Niharika's father
- Aanchal Munjal as Niharika, Ambika and Animesh's daughter
- Vishal Singh as Bhavesh, Ambika's younger brother
- Amar Sharma as Keshav, Jamuna's son, Ambika's one-sided obsessive lover who later possesses Niharika
