= Khatron Ke Khiladi 7 =

Indian reality television series

Fear Factor: Khatron Ke Khiladi
- Season 7
- Title screen
- Presented by: Arjun Kapoor
- No. of contestants: 15
- Winner: Sidharth Shukla
- Runner-up: Sana Saeed
- No. of episodes: 20

Release
- Original network: Colors TV
- Original release: 30 January – 3 April 2016

Season chronology
- ← Previous; Season 6 Next → Season 8

Fear Factor: Khatron Ke Khiladi Kabhi Peeda, Kabhi Keeda is the seventh season of Fear Factor: Khatron Ke Khiladi, an Indian reality and stunt television series, aired from 31 January 2016 to 3 April 2016 on Colors TV. The series was produced by Endemol Shine India. The season was hosted by Arjun Kapoor and shot in Argentina. Sidharth Shukla emerged as the winner of the season and Sana Saeed was the runner-up.

== Contestants ==
| Name | Occupation | Place | Status | Ref |
|---|---|---|---|---|
| Sidharth Shukla | Actor & Model | 1 | Eliminated | |
| Sidharth Shukla | Actor & Model | 1 | Winner | |
| Sana Saeed | Actress | 2 | 1st runner-up | |
| Mukti Mohan | Actress | 3 | 2nd runner-up | |
| Tanishaa Mukerji | Actress | 4 | Eliminated | |
| Vivian Dsena | Actor, Model | 5 | Eliminated | |
| Raghav Juyal | Dancer | 6 | Eliminated | |
| Vivan Bhatena | Actor & Model | 7 | Eliminated | |
| Parvathy Omanakuttan | Model | 8 | Eliminated | |
| Jay Bhanushali | Actor & Presenter | 9 | Eliminated | |
| Jay Bhanushali | Actor & Presenter | 9 | Quit | |
| Mahhi Vij | Actress | 10 | Eliminated | |
| Aishwarya Sakhuja | Actress | 11 | Eliminated | |
| Tina Datta | Actress | 12 | Eliminated | |
| Faisal Khan | Dancer | 13 | Eliminated | |
| Yuvraj Valmiki | Hockey Player | 14 | Eliminated | |
| Himmanshu Malhotra | Actor | 15 | Eliminated | |

Indicates original entrants
Indicates the wild card entrants
Indicates re-entered entrants

=== Guest contestants ===
There was a segment aired where six popular celebrities will face their fears in many fun filled exciting stunt tasks. Former contestant Jay Bhanushali had presented this segment.

- Arjun Bijlani – Actor.
- Karishma Tanna – Actress.
- Mouni Roy – Actress.
- Radhika Madan – Actress.
- Rishabh Sinha – Actor.
- Surbhi Jyoti – Actress.

== Elimination chart ==
| | Weeks | | | | | | | | | | | | | | | | | | | | | | | | | | | | | | | |
| | 1 | | | 2 | | | 3 | | | 4 | | | 5 | | | 6 | | | 7 | | | 8 | | | 9 | | | 10 Grand Finale | | | | |
| | 30-31 Jan | | | 7-8 Feb | | | 13-14 Feb | | | 20-21 Feb | | | 27-28 Feb | | | 5-6 Mar | | | 12-13 Mar | | | 19-20 Mar | | | 26-27 Mar | | | 2-3 apr | | | | |
|---|---|---|---|---|---|---|---|---|---|---|---|---|---|---|---|---|---|---|---|---|---|---|---|---|---|---|---|---|---|---|---|---|
| Sidharth | LOST | SAFE | | WIN | | | WIN | | | LOST | BTM2 | ELIMINATED | | | | | WIN | | WIN | | | WIN | | | LOST | | SAFE | WIN | | Finalist | WIN | WINNER |
| Mukti | LOST | SAFE | | LOST | BTM2 | SAFE | WIN | | | LOST | SAFE | | WIN | | | WIN | | | LOST | | SAFE | LOST | SAFE | | LOST | | SAFE | WIN | | Finalist | WIN | 1ST RUNNER-UP |
| Sana | WIN | | | WIN | | | WIN | | | WIN | | | LOST | | SAFE | WIN | | | WIN | | | WIN | | | LOST | | SAFE | BTM4 | SAFE | Finalist | WIN | 2ND RUNNER-UP |
| Raghav | WIN | | | LOST | | SAFE | LOST | | SAFE | WIN | | | WIN | | | WIN | | | WIN | | | WIN | | | LOST | BTM6 | SAFE | WIN | | FINALIST | LOST | ELIMINATED |
| Vivian | NOT IN COMPETITION | | | | | | | | | Wild Card | WIN | | LOST | SAFE | | WIN | | | LOST | | SAFE | WIN | | | WIN | | | BTM4 | SAFE | FINALIST | LOST | ELIMINATED |
| Tanishaa | WIN | | | WIN | | | WIN | | | LOST | SAFE | | LOST | | | WIN | | | WIN | | | LOST | | SAFE | WIN | | | WIN | | Finalist | LOST | ELIMINATED |
| Vivan | LOST | BTM2 | SAFE | WIN | | | LOST | BTM2 | SAFE | WIN | | | LOST | | | LOST | BTM3 | SAFE | WIN | | | LOST | | SAFE | WIN | | | BTM4 | ELIMINATED | | | |
| Parvathy | LOST | SAFE | | WIN | | | LOST | | SAFE(by team) | WIN | | | WIN | | | WIN | | | LOST | SAFE | | LOST | BTM6 | SAFE | LOST | BTM6 | ELIMINATED | | | | | |
| Jay | WIN | | | LOST | BTM2 | ELIMINATED | | | | | | | WIN | | | LOST | SAFE | | LOST | BTM2 | SAFE | WIN | | | LOST | N\A | Quit | | | | | |
| Mahhi | LOST | SAFE | | LOST | SAFE | | LOST | | SAFE | LOST | | SAFE | LOST | | SAFE | WIN | | | LOST | | SAFE | LOST | BTM6 | ELIMINATED | | | | | | | | |
| Aishwarya | WIN | | | WIN | | | WIN | | | LOST | | SAFE | WIN | | | LOST | BTM4 | SAFE | LOST | BTM4 | ELIMINATED | | | | | | | | | | | |
| Tina | LOST | SAFE | | LOST | | SAFE | WIN | | | LOST | BTM4 | SAFE | WIN | BTM4 | SAFE | LOST | BTM2 | ELIMINATED | | | | | | | | | | | | | | |
| Faisal | WIN | | | LOST | | SAFE | WIN | | | WIN | | | BTM4 | ELIMINATED | | | | | | | | | | | | | | | | | | |
| Yuvraj | WIN | | | LOST | SAFE | | LOST | BTM2 | ELIMINATED | | | | | | | | | | | | | | | | | | | | | | | |
| Himmanshu | LOST | BTM2 | ELIMINATED | | | | | | | | | | | | | | | | | | | | | | | | | | | | | |

Winner
1st Runner Up
2nd Runner Up
Finalists
Ticket to finale
Lost task
Won first task
Was safe from elimination stunt
Was saved by his/her team for elimination
Was nominated by his/her team for elimination
Bottom position
Saved
Eliminated
Wild card entry
Injury/health halt
N/A
Voluntary exit
