= Prerna Wanvari =

Indian television actress

- Born: Bombay, Maharashtra, India
- Occupation: Actress
- Years active: 2009 – Present
- Awards: Nominated for Gold Awards

Prerna Wanvari is an Indian actress. She has acted in TV shows, like Bandini, Koi Aane Ko Hai, Adaalat, Gumrah: End of Innocence, Sapna Babul Ka...Bidaai and Parichay. She presented the Arts Programming Award at the International Emmy Awards Gala which was held at New York's Hilton Hotel in November 2012. She is the daughter of the 22 year old Indiantelevision.com group founder, CEO and editor in chief Anil NM Wanvari and Satya Wanvari – a journalist, film critic, and scriptwriter.

== Television ==
- 2009 Koi Aane Ko Hai as Neelam and Ratna- Double Role
- 2010 Sapna Babul Ka...Bidaai as Shivani
- 2009–11 Bandini as Kadambari
- 2011 Gumrah: End of Innocence as Simran
- 2011–13 Parichay as Raveena Chopra Grewal
- 2013–14 Adaalat as Sunaina
- 2015 Aahat (TV series) as Manisha
- 2015 Pyaar Tune Kya Kiya (TV series) as Varsha
- 2015 Tujhse Naaraz Nahi Zindagi as Zeenat Sheikh
- 2015 Gumrah: End of Innocence
- 2015 Code Red
- 2016 24 (Indian TV series Season 2) in an extended cameo role.
- 2017 Chandrakanta as Vishakha/ Mayavi, a skilled and powerful sorceress (ayyara)
- 2022 Bohot Pyaar Karte Hai as Kadambari Patel
- 2023 Hum Rahe Na Rahe Hum as Swatilekha Raizada

== Reality television ==
- 2009–11 Nachle Ve with Saroj Khan – Season 2
- Nachle Ve with Saroj Khan & Terence Lewis – Season 3 (Prerna Wanvari)

== Feature films ==
- 2015 P Se PM Tak as Rashmi
- 2017 Habib Faisal's untitled next as Pratibha. A Yash Raj Films Production
