= Madan Meena =

Indian artist

- Born: 13 October 1974
- Occupation(s): Visual Artist and Folklore Researcher
- Awards: Marwar Ratna, Mehrangarh Museum Trust (2018)

Madan Meena is an Indian visual artist and folklore researcher. He was born in Narayanpur village located in Sawai Madhopur district of Rajasthan.
