= Dangal 2 =

Indian Hindi-language Entertainment channel

- Country: India
- Broadcast area: India
- Headquarters: Mumbai, Maharashtra

Programming
- Language: Hindi

Ownership
- Owner: Enterr10 Television Network
- Sister channels: Dangal TV; Bhojpuri Cinema TV; Enterr10 Bangla; Fakt Marathi

History
- Launched: April 2, 2022; 4 years ago
- Replaced: Enterr10 Movies

Availability

Streaming media
- Dangal Play: Dangal 2

Dangal 2 is an Hindi language free-to-air general entertainment channel owned by Enterr10 Television Network. It was launched on 2 April 2022 by replacing Enterr10 Movies and the channel airs original shows from their own and unaired acquired shows from Imagine TV and re-run shows from Dangal TV.

== Programming ==
=== Current broadcast ===
Year	Show
2023–present	CID
2022–present	Ramayan
2026–present	Jai Hanuman – Sankatmochan Naam Tiharo

=== Former broadcast ===
==== Original programming ====
Year	Show
2023	Professor Pandey Ke Paanch Parivaar
2023	S. T. T. (Special Task Team)

==== Acquired series ====
Year	Shows
2023	Aladdin – Naam Toh Suna Hoga
2023	Adaalat
2022	Basera
2023–2024	Bade Achhe Lagte Hain
2024	Baalveer
2023	Chidiya Ghar
2022	Dharampatni
2023	Dus Ka Dum
2023	F.I.R.
2022	Haar Jeet
2023	Ichhapyaari Naagin
2023	Jassi Jaissi Koi Nahin
2023	Kuch Rang Pyar Ke Aise Bhi
2022–2023	Kaun Banega Crorepati
2023	Lapataganj
2022	Radhaa Ki Betiyaan Kuch Kar Dikhayengi
2023	Sajan Re Jhoot Mat Bolo
2023–2024	Saas Bina Sasural
2023–2025	Sankat Mochan Mahabali Hanumaan
2023	Tenali Rama

==== Re-Run series ====
Year	Shows
2022	Alif Laila
2022	Aye Mere Humsafar
2022	Baba Aiso Varr Dhoondo
2022	Bandini
2022	Beend Banoongaa Ghodi Chadhunga
2022–2023	Chandragupta Maurya
2022	Do Hanson Ka Jodaa
2022	Devi Adi Parashakti
2022-2023	Dwarkadheesh Bhagwan Shree Krishn
2022	Gunahon Ka Devta
2022	Jyoti
2022	Jasuben Jayantilaal Joshi Ki Joint Family
2022	Kitani Mohabbat Hai
2022	Main Teri Parchhain Hoon
2022	Meera
2022	Mahima Shani Dev Ki
2023	Mast Mauli
2022–2023	Nath – Zewar Ya Zanjeer
2022	Phir Laut Aayi Naagin
2022	Pyaar Ki Luka Chuppi
2022	Prem Bandhan
2022	Rakt Sambandh
2022	Rehna Hai Teri Palkon Ki Chhaon Mein
2022	Rakshabandhan... Rasal Apne Bhai Ki Dhal
2022	Rang Jaun Tere Rang Mein
2022	Ranju Ki Betiyaan
2022	Sawaare Sabke Sapne Preeto
2022–2023	Sindoor Ki Keemat
2023	Shubh Shagun
