= Neena Cheema =

Indian TV and film actress

- Born: Jalandhar, Punjab
- Occupation: Actress
- Years active: 1983–present

Neena Cheema is an Indian veteran actress. After a long career in stage plays and Punjabi television, she shifted to Mumbai in 1998 and since has performed in a number of TV serials and Hindi and Punjabi films.

== Films ==
- Mann (1999) – Uncredited

== Television ==
Year	Show	Role	Language	Network
1988	Khanabadosh	Unknown	Urdu	
1989	Flop Show	Various Characters/Roles	Hindi	DD National
1993–1994	Lafafi	Preetho/Lafafi	Punjabi	Jalandhar Doordarshan
1996	Parchhaven	Devyani/Debo	Punjabi	Jalandhar Doordarshan
2004	Aakrosh	Guruma	Hindi	DD National
2012	Savdhaan India	Pushpa (Episode 360) / Rukminidevi (Episode 496) / Mrs. Deshpande (Episode 783) / Mrs. Bhatia (Episode 890) / Nimrat Kaur Singh (Episode 1035)	Hindi	Life Ok
2013	Arjun	Kalyani P. Singh	Hindi	StarPlus
2015–2016	Kalash	Savitri Deol	Hindi	Life OK
2016	Kavach	Damyanti	Hindi	Colors
2018	Kaleerein	Kaveri Dhingra	Hindi	Zee TV
2018–2019	Silsila Badalte Rishton Ka	Yamini Devi Malhotra	Hindi	Colors
2019–2020	Kumkum Bhagya	Sarita Gupta	Hindi	Zee TV
2021	Teri Laadli Main	Durga Kumari Vashishtha	Hindi	Star Bharat
2021–2025	Bhagya Lakshmi	Harleen Oberoi	Hindi	Zee TV
2022	Mann Sundar	Bua Sa	Hindi	Dangal TV
2022–2023	Parineeti	Beeji	Hindi	Colors
2026–present	Dr. Aarambhi	Kunika Chawla	Hindi	Colors
2026–present	Dilo Ki Ram Leela	Saroj	Hindi	Zee TV

== Other works ==
=== Telefilms ===
- Chacha Maarenge, Hindi
- Chuniya, Hindi, 1990
- Aagosh, Hindi, 1987
- Thes, Hindi, 1985
- Sailab, Hindi, 1985

=== Teleplays ===
- Gas Regulator, Hindi
- Ladayi, Hindi, 1993
- Wapasi, Hindi, 1983

=== Stage plays ===
- Rangnagri, Hindi
