= Chetanya Adib =

Indian actor (born 1971)

- Born: 10 November 1971 (age 54); Jaipur, Rajasthan, India
- Occupations: Actor; model; singer
- Years active: 1997–present

Chetanya Adib is an Indian actor, model and singer who speaks English and Hindi. He is best known for playing Khajan Singh in the Hindi soap-opera show, Balika Vadhu on Colors TV.

== Filmography ==
Year	Film	Role	Notes
2004	Ab Bas!	Bhaskar	
2010	Rakta Charitra	Tella Durga	
2016	Mumbai Central	Sailm Dalla	

== Television ==
Year	Serial	Role	Notes
1999	Suraag – The Clue	Vinod Shukla, Sanjeev Choudhary, Rohan Kumar Ranjan, Brijesh Karthik, Rocky Malhotra, Munna, Srikant Rai, and Akash	Episodic roles
2002	Kuntee	Mann	Love interest of Kuntee (DD Metro)
2003	C.I.D.	Kaushal	Episodic role in episode 252 - The Case of the Wedding Blues (Part 2)
2004	Aakrosh	Alok Ahuja	
2005–2008	Saat Phere – Saloni Ka Safar	Kunjan Singh	
2007	Hero - Bhakti Hi Shakti Hai	Veer Sehgal (Joy's father) / Virat (Main Antagonist)	
2011	C.I.D.	Manu	Episodic role in episode 738 - Raaz Khooni Chetawani Ka
2008–2015	Balika Vadhu	Khajan Singh	
2016	Siya Ke Ram	Jatayu	
2018	Chandrashekhar	Ashfaqulla Khan	
2019-2020	Pyaar Ki Luka Chuppi	Ravi Shankar	
2021	Kuch Toh Hai: Naagin Ek Naye Rang Mein		
2022	Rang Jaun Tere Rang Mein	Surendra Chaubey	
2023	Tulsidham Ke Laddu Gopal	Rahu	
2026–present	Hastinapur Ke Veer	Kripacharya	

== Dubbing roles ==
=== Live action television series ===
Title	Actor	Character	Dub Language	Original Language	Episodes	Original airdate	Dub airdate	Notes
The Young and the Restless	N.P. Schoch J. Eddie Peck	Cole Howard	Hindi	English	11000	26 March 1973 – present		
Batman	Adam West †	Bruce Wayne / Batman	Hindi	English	120	12/1/1966– 14 March 1968		Dubbed into Hindi.
Power Rangers Dino Thunder	Jason David Frank †	Dr. Tommy Oliver / Black Dino Ranger	Hindi	English	38	14 February – 20 November 2004		
Lucifer	Tom Ellis	Lucifer Morningstar	Hindi	English		25/1/2016– present		
Dracula	Claes Bang	Count Dracula	Hindi	English		1 January 2020– present		

=== Animated series ===
Title	Original voice	Character	Dub Language	Original Language	Episodes	Original airdate	Dubbed airdate	Notes
Spider-Man: The New Animated Series	Ian Ziering	Harry Osborn	Hindi	English	13	11 July – 12 September 2003		
Justice League Unlimited	Carl Lumbly	J'onn J'onzz/Martian Manhunter	Hindi	English	39	07/31/2004- 5/13/2006		
The Avengers: Earth's Mightiest Heroes	Brian Bloom	Steve Rogers / Captain America	Hindi	English	52	22 September 2010 – 5 May 2013		
Ultimate Spider-Man	Roger Craig Smith	Steve Rogers / Captain America	Hindi	English	9			
Hulk and the Agents of S.M.A.S.H.	Roger Craig Smith	Steve Rogers / Captain America	Hindi	English	4			
Avengers Assemble	Roger Craig Smith	Steve Rogers / Captain America	Hindi	English	126			
Guardians of the Galaxy	Roger Craig Smith	Steve Rogers / Captain America	Hindi	English	3			
Spider-Man	Roger Craig Smith	Steve Rogers / Captain America	Hindi	English	5			
The Adventures of Rocky and Bullwinkle	Daran Norris	Narrator	Hindi	English				
Batman: Caped Crusader	Diedrich Bader	Harvey Dent / Two-Face	Hindi	English	10	1 August 2024	1 August 2024	Available on Prime Video

=== Live action films ===
==== Indian films ====
Title	Actor	Character	Dub Language	Original Language	Original Year release	Dub Year release	Notes
Prince	Isaiah	Sarang Sanghvi	Hindi		2010		
Saaho	Arun Vijay	Vishwank	Hindi		2019		
Sooryavanshi	Ajay Devgn	Bajirao Singham	English	Hindi	2021	2021	
Mr. Perfect	Prabhas	Vicky	Hindi	Telugu	2011	2013	The Hindi dub was titled: No. 1 Mr. Perfect.
Athadu	Mahesh Babu	Nanda Gopal (Nandu) / Partha Sarathi (Pardhu) (Paras in Hindi version)	Hindi	Telugu	2005	2013	The Hindi dub was titled: Cheetah: The Power Of One.
Baadshah	Narrator		Hindi	Telugu	2013	2013	The Hindi dub was titled: Rowdy Baadshah.
Darling	Prabhas	Prabha / Prabhas	Hindi	Telugu	2010	2013	The Hindi dub was titled: Sabse Badhkar Hum.
Vettaikaran	Vijay	"Police" Ravi	Hindi	Tamil	2009	2014	The Hindi dub was titled: Dangerous Khiladi 3.
Takkari Donga	Mahesh Babu	Raja	Hindi	Telugu	2002	2014	The Hindi dub was titled: Choron Ka Chor.
Jilla	Vijay	Sakthi	Hindi	Tamil	2014	2014	The Hindi dub was titled: Policewala Gunda 2.
Rebel	Prabhas	Rishi/Rebel	Hindi	Telugu	2012	2014	
Veta	Srikanth	Jagan	Hindi	Telugu	2014	2014	The Hindi dub was titled: Badle Ki Aag.
Chakram	Prabhas	Chakram	Hindi	Telugu	2005	2014	
All the Best	Srikanth	Ravi	Hindi	Telugu	2012	2014	The Hindi dub was titled: Risk.
Balupu	Narrator		Hindi	Telugu	2013	2014	The Hindi dub was titled: Jani Dushman.
Seethamma Vakitlo Sirimalle Chettu	Venkatesh	Peddodu	Hindi	Telugu	2013	2015	The Hindi dub was titled: Sabse Badhkar Hum 2.
Mirchi	Prabhas	Jai	Hindi	Telugu	2013	2015	The Hindi dub was titled: Khatarnak Khiladi.
Mirchi	Prabhas	Jai	Hindustani	Telugu	2013	2021	
Thuppakki	Vijay	Jagdish	Hindi	Tamil	2012	2015	The Hindi dub was titled: Indian Soldier: Never On Holiday.
Thirumalai	Vijay	Thirumalai	Hindi	Tamil	2003	2015	The Hindi dub was titled: Dum 2.
Thadaka	Sunil	Sivarama Krishna	Hindi	Telugu	2013	2016	
Aambala	Abhishek	Periya Ponnu's husband	Hindi	Tamil	2015	2016	
Vedalam	Ashwin Kakumanu	Arjun	Hindi	Tamil	2015	2016	
Maari	Vijay Yesudas	Inspector Arjun	Hindi	Tamil	2015	2016	The Hindi dub was titled: Rowdy Hero.
Biriyani	Karthi	Sugan	Hindi	Tamil	2013	2016	The Hindi dub was titled: Dum Biryani.
Saguni	Karthi	Kamalakannan alias Kannan	Hindi	Tamil	2012	2016	The Hindi dub was titled: Rowdy Leader.
Kaashmora	Karthi	Kaashmora / Raja Nayak	Hindi	Tamil	2016	2017	
Terror	Srikanth	Vijay	Hindi	Telugu	2016	2017	
Aayirathil Oruvan	Karthi	Muthu	Hindi	Tamil	2010	2017	The Hindi dub was titled: Kaashmora 2.
Thalaivaa	Vijay	Vishwa Bhai	Hindi	Tamil	2013	2017	The Hindi dub was titled: Thalaivaa - The Leader.
Sura	Vijay	Sura	Hindi	Tamil	2010	2016	
Santhu Straight Forward	Shaam	Deva	Hindi	Kannada	2016	2018	The Hindi dub was titled: Rambo Straight Forward.
All in All Azhagu Raja	Karthi	Azhagu Raja (Ajay Raja in Hindi version) and Young Muthukrishnan	Hindi	Tamil	2013	2018	
Nenu Local	Naveen Chandra	Siddharth Varma	Hindi	Telugu	2017	2018	
Gopala Gopala	Venkatesh	Kanneganti Gopal Rao	Hindi	Telugu	2015	2018	
Gulaebaghavali	Prabhu Deva	Badri	Hindi	Tamil	2018	2018	
Hebbuli	Sudeep	Ram	Hindi	Kannada	2017	2018	
Abhinetri	Prabhu Deva	Krishna Kumar	Hindi	Telugu	2016	2018	
Vikram Vedha	R. Madhavan	Vikram	Hindi	Tamil	2017	2018	
Theeran Adhigaaram Ondru	Karthi	Theeran Thirumaran DSP	Hindi	Tamil	2017	2018	The Hindi dub was titled: Theeran.
Saithan	Vijay Antony	Dinesh / Sharma	Hindi	Tamil	2016	2018	The Hindi dub was titled: Shaitan.
Paruthiveeran	Karthi	Paruthiveeran	Hindi	Tamil	2007	2018	The Hindi dub was titled: Meri Awargi.
Tik Tik Tik	Aaron Aziz	Captain Lee Wei	Hindi	Tamil	2018	2018	
Thikka	Narrator		Hindi	Telugu	2016	2018	The Hindi dub was titled: Rocket Raja.
Remo	S.J. Suryah	Narrator	Hindi	Tamil	2016	2018	
Kavacham	Neil Nitin Mukesh (voice in original version dubbed by Vedala Hemachandra)	Vikramaditya	Hindi	Telugu	2018	2019	The Hindi dub was titled: Inspector Vijay.
Shailaja Reddy Alludu	Narrator		Hindi	Telugu	2018	2019	The Hindi dub was titled: Thadaka 2.
Kalakalappu 2	Jai	Raghu	Hindi	Tamil	2018	2019	
U Turn	Narain	Ritesh	Hindi	Telugu	2018	2019	
Dev	Karthi	Dev Ramalingam	Hindi	Tamil	2019	2019	
Kaithi	Karthi	Dilli (Shiva in Hindi version)	Hindi	Tamil	2019	2020	
Thambi	Karthi	Saravanan / Vicky	Hindi	Tamil	2019	2020	The Hindi dub was titled: My Brother Vicky.
Stalin	Chiranjeevi	Stalin	Hindi	Telugu	2006	2022	
Puthiya Niyamam	Mammootty	Adv. Louis Pothen	Hindi	Malayalam	2016	2020	The Hindi dub was titled: Mera Sangharsh.
Siruthai	Karthi	Rocket Raja and DSP Rathnavel Pandian	Hindi	Tamil	2011	2020	
Vada Chennai	Narrator		Hindi	Tamil	2018	2020	The Hindi dub was titled: Chennai Central.
Jack & Daniel	Arjun Sarja	Daniel Alexander IPS	Hindi	Malayalam	2019	2020	
Sathya	Santhosh	SI Ganesh	Hindi	Tamil	2017	2020	
Soorarai Pottru	Vivek Prasanna	Sebastian	Hindi	Tamil	2020	2021	The Hindi dub was titled: Udaan.
Miss India	Naveen Chandra	Vijay Anand	Hindi	Telugu	2020	2021	
Asuran	Narrator		Hindi	Tamil	2019	2021	
Tamaar Padaar	Prithviraj Sukumaran	ACP Pouran	Hindi	Malayalam	2014	2021	The Hindi dub was titled: The Real De Dana Dan 2.
Munna	Prabhas	Munna	Hindustani	Telugu	2007	2021	The Hindustani dub was titled: Rowdy Munna.
Odeya	Darshan	Gajendra Narayana Verma	Hindi	Kannada	2019	2021	
Lakshmi	Venkatesh	Lakshmi Narayana (Surya Narasimha in Hindustani version)	Hindustani	Telugu	2007	2021	
Magamuni	Arya	Magadevan and Muniraj	Hindi	Tamil	2019	2021	The Hindi dub was titled: Mahamuni.
Chatrapathi	Prabhas	Sivaji / Chatrapathi	Hindi	Telugu	2005	2021	The Hindi dub was titled: Hukumat Ki Jung.
Namo Venkatesa	Venkatesh	Venkataramana a.k.a. Venky / Praneeth	Hindustani	Telugu	2010	2021	
Bheeshma	Jisshu Sengupta (voice in original version dubbed by Vedala Hemachandra)	Raghavan	Hindi	Telugu	2020	2022	
Yogi	Prabhas	Eeshwar Chandra Prasad alias Yogi	Hindustani	Telugu	2007	2022	
Sarileru Neekevvaru	Murali Sharma	Ajay's Brigadier	Hindi	Telugu	2020	2022	The Hindi dub was titled: Sarileru.
Daaku Maharaaj	Bobby Deol (Voice in original dubbed by P. Ravi Shankar)	Balwant Singh Thakur	Hindi	Telugu	2025	2025	

==== Foreign language films ====
Title	Actor	Character	Dub Language	Original Language	Original Year release	Dub Year release	Notes
Dr. No	Sean Connery †	James Bond	Hindi	English	1962	Unknown	
Bram Stoker's Dracula	Keanu Reeves	Jonathan Harker	Hindi	English; Romanian; Greek; Bulgarian; Latin	1992	2001	2001 Hindi-dubbed Home media release
The Fast and the Furious	Vin Diesel	Dominic Toretto	Hindi	English	2001	2001	
Fast & Furious	Paul Walker †	Brian O'Conner	Hindi	English	2009	2009	
Fast Five	Paul Walker †	Brian O'Conner	Hindi	English	2011	2011	
Fast & Furious 6	Paul Walker †	Brian O'Conner	Hindi	English; Spanish	2013	2013	
Furious 7	Paul Walker †; Caleb Walker; Cody Walker	Brian O'Conner	Hindi	English	2015	2015	
Spider-Man	James Franco	Harry Osborn	Hindi	English	2002	2002	
Spider-Man 2	James Franco	Harry Osborn	Hindi	English	2004	2004	
Spider-Man 3	James Franco	Harry Osborn / New Goblin	Hindi	English	2007	2007	
Tron Legacy	Garrett Hedlund	Sam Flynn	Hindi	English	2010	2010	
Pirates of the Caribbean: Dead Man's Chest	Tom Hollander	Cutler Beckett	Hindi	English	2006	2006	
Pirates of the Caribbean: At World's End	Tom Hollander	Cutler Beckett	Hindi	English	2007	2007	
Iron Man	Clark Gregg	Agent Phil Coulson	Hindi	English	2008	2008	
Iron Man 2	Clark Gregg	Agent Phil Coulson	Hindi	English	2010	2010	
Thor	Clark Gregg	Agent Phil Coulson	Hindi	English	2011	2011	
The Avengers	Clark Gregg	Agent Phil Coulson	Hindi	English	2012	2012	
Captain Marvel	Clark Gregg	Agent Phil Coulson	Hindi	English	2019	2019	
Transformers: Age of Extinction	Mark Wahlberg	Cade Yeager	Hindi	English	2014	2014	
Transformers: The Last Knight	Mark Wahlberg	Cade Yeager	Hindi	English	2017	2017	
Don't Be Afraid of the Dark	Guy Pearce	Alex Hurst	Hindi	English	2011	2011	
World War Z	Pierfrancesco Favino	Head of Research Team	Hindi	English	2013	2013	
Teenage Mutant Ninja Turtles	William Fichtner	Eric Sacks	Hindi	English	2014	2014	
Inkheart	Brendan Fraser	Mortimer "Mo" Folchart	Hindi	English	2008		Aired by UTV Action
Inception	Ken Watanabe	Mr. Saito	Hindi	English	2010	2013	
The Twilight Saga: New Moon	Robert Pattinson	Edward Cullen	Hindi	English	2009	2009	
The Twilight Saga: Eclipse	Robert Pattinson	Edward Cullen	Hindi	English	2010	2010	
Star Wars: The Force Awakens	Adam Driver	Kylo Ren	Hindi	English	2015	2015	
Star Wars: The Last Jedi	Adam Driver	Kylo Ren	Hindi	English	2017	2017	
Star Wars: The Rise of Skywalker	Adam Driver	Kylo Ren	Hindi	English	2019	2019	
Captain America: Civil War	Martin Freeman	Everett K. Ross	Hindi	English	2016	2016	
Black Panther	Martin Freeman	Everett K. Ross	Hindi	English	2018	2018	
Logan	Boyd Holbrook	Donald Pierce	Hindi	English	2017	2017	
Kingsman: The Golden Circle	Pedro Pascal	Jack Daniels / Whiskey	Hindi	English	2017	2017	
Constantine	Keanu Reeves	John Constantine	Hindi	English	2005	2005	
The Greatest Showman	Hugh Jackman	P. T. Barnum	Hindi	English	2017	2018	
Venom	Tom Hardy	Eddie Brock	Hindi	English	2018	2018	
The Meg	Jason Statham	Jonas Taylor	Hindi	English; Chinese	2018	2018	
Gemini Man	Will Smith	Henry Brogan / Jackson Brogan (dual role)	Hindi	English	2019	2019	

=== Animated films ===
Title	Original voice	Character	Dub Language	Original Language	Original Year Release	Dub Year Release	Notes
Stuart Little 3: Call of the Wild	Hugh Laurie	Mr. Frederick	Hindi	English	2005	Unknown	
Epic	Colin Farrell	Ronin	Hindi	English	2013	2013	

== See also ==
- List of Indian dubbing artists
