= Aparna Dixit =

Indian television actress (born 1991)

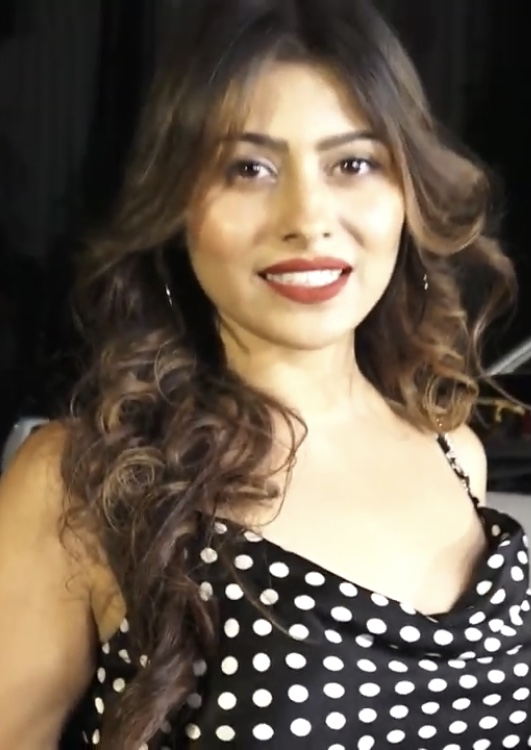
- Dixit in 2019
- Born: 20 October 1991 (age 34); Agra, Uttar Pradesh, India
- Occupations: Actress; Model
- Years active: 2013–present
- Known for: Yeh Dil Sun Raha Hai; Kalash – Ek Vishwaas; Bepanah Pyaar; Pyaar Ki Luka Chuppi

Aparna Dixit (born 20 October 1991) is an Indian television actress who appears predominantly in Hindi cinema. She is best known for playing Purvi in Sony Pal's Yeh Dil Sun Raha Hai, Devika in Life OK's Kalash – Ek Vishwaas, Bani in Colors TV's Bepanah Pyaar, and Srishti in Dangal's Pyaar Ki Luka Chuppi.

== Early life ==
Dixit was born on 20 October 1991 in Agra, India. She has a younger brother, Agam Dixit, who is also an actor.

== Career ==
Dixit made her 2013 acting debut in Star Plus's mythological series Mahabharat as Maharani Ambika. She followed this with a role in Zee TV's Pavitra Rishta from 2013 to 2014. In 2014, Dixit portrayed Gauri in Colors TV's Meri Aashiqui Tum Se Hi. Her breakthrough came with a lead role in Sony Pal's Yeh Dil Sun Raha Hai, opposite Navi Bhangu as Purvi, this show went off the air in February 2015.

She then played the protagonist Devika in Life OK's Kalash – Ek Vishwaas opposite Krip Suri, which aired from 2015 until 2017. In 2016, she participated in Colors TV's Box Cricket League 2. In 2018, she played Roxana in Sony Entertainment Television's Porus.

In October 2018, she reunited with her Kalash co-actor, Krip Suri, for &TV's Laal Ishq, performing an episodic role as Savitri. In 2019, she played the role of Bani in Bepannah Pyaar, alongside Pearl V Puri and Ishita Dutta. Her character was initially a cameo role which was extended. The show ended in February 2020. She later participated in Colors TV's reality show Khatra Khatra Khatra. From 2019 to 2020, she played the lead of Srishti in Dangal's Pyar Ki Luka Chuppi, opposite Rahul Sharma. The show ended in September 2020. Recently, she performed in a Hindi language web series titled Exit.

From April to August 2022, she portrayed the main antagonist, Anjali Malhotra, in Star Bharat's Woh Toh Hai Albelaa alongside Shaheer Sheikh and Hiba Nawab. Since December 2023, she has played the lead role of Devi Dhamini in Shemaroo TV's Karmadhikari Shanidev.

== Filmography ==
=== Television ===
Year	Title	Role	Notes	Ref.
2013	Mahabharat	Maharani Ambika		
2013–2014	Pavitra Rishta	Manasi		
2014	Meri Aashiqui Tum Se Hi	Gauri		
2014–2015	Yeh Dil Sun Raha Hai	Purvi Singh		
2015–2017	Kalash – Ek Vishwaas	Devika Ravi Garewal		
2016	Box Cricket League 2	Contestant		
2018	Porus	Queen Roxana		
2018	Laal Ishq	Savitri		
2019	Bepanah Pyaar	Bani Raghbir Malhotra		
2019	Khatra Khatra Khatra	Contestant		
2019–2020	Pyaar Ki Luka Chuppi	Srishti Yadav		
2022	Woh Toh Hai Albelaa	Anjali Malhotra		
2023–2024	Karmadhikari Shanidev	Devi Dhamini		
2024–2025	Tulsi – Hamari Badi Sayani	Janaki Raghuveer Raichand		

== Personal life ==
On 3 July 2022, Dixit was diagnosed with chickenpox, and immediately stopped shooting for her ongoing series Woh Toh Hai Albelaa until her complete recovery.
