= Pearl V Puri =

Indian actor (born 1989)

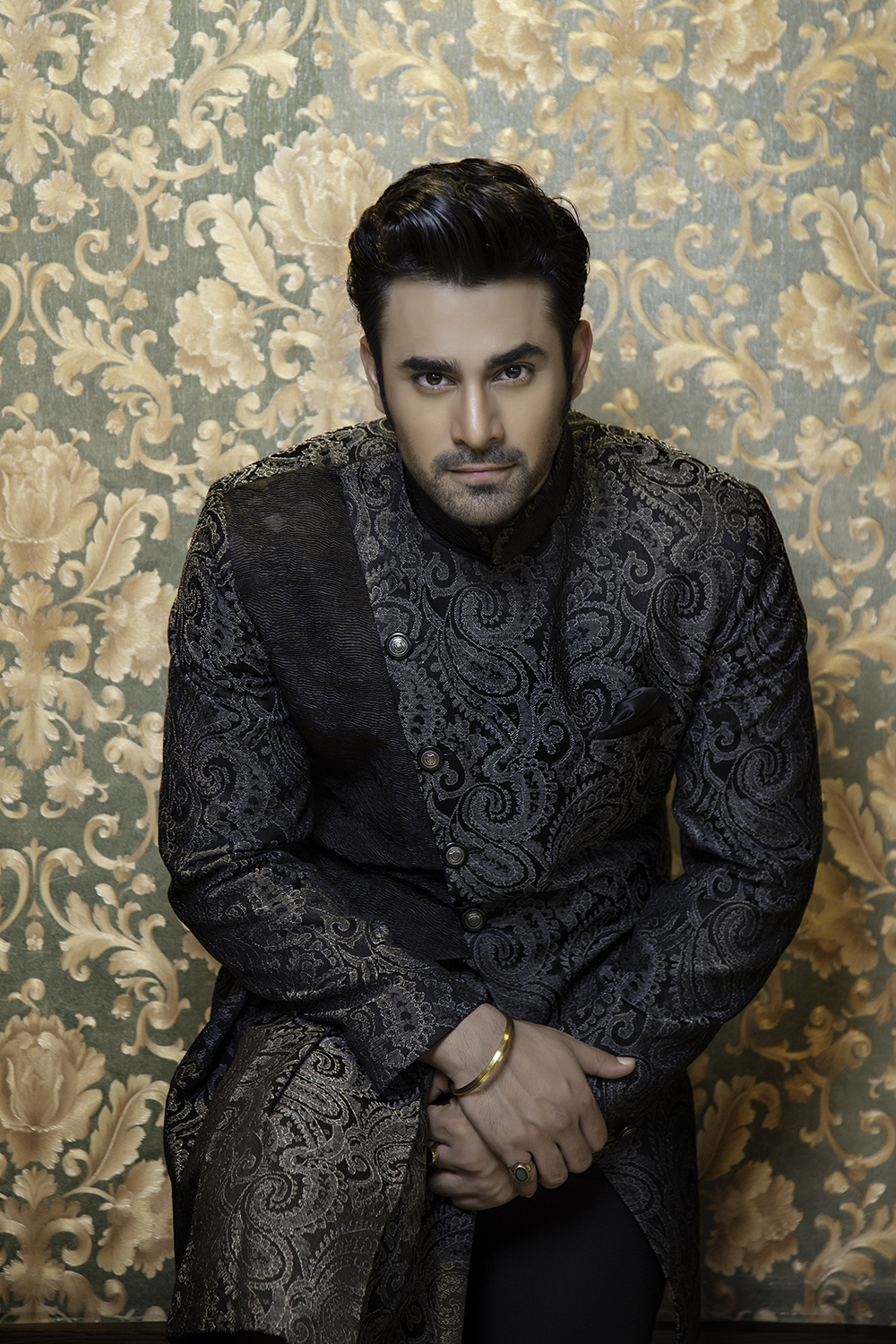
- Born: 10 July 1989 (age 37); Chhindwara, Madhya Pradesh, India
- Occupation: Actor
- Years active: 2013–present
- Known for: Naagin 3; Bepanah Pyaar
- Awards: Gold Awards (For Best Actor Male)

Pearl V Puri (born 10 July 1989) is an Indian television actor. He is best known for playing Mahir Sehgal in Naagin 3 and Raghbir Malhotra in Bepanah Pyaar. He made his Hindi film debut in the 2023 film Yaariyan 2.

== Early life ==
Pearl V Puri was born on 10 July 1989 in Chhindwara, Madhya Pradesh, into a Punjabi Khatri family to Vipin Puri and Pummy Puri. He has an elder sister Reet Vohra aka Quety Puri. Puri started his schooling at Maharishi Vidya Mandir Public School, Chhindwara. After a few years his family moved to Agra, Uttar Pradesh where he was enrolled at Raghendra Swarup Public School.

His father wanted him to join their family business but his mother supported his decision of becoming an actor. He began his career as a model and appeared in several commercials for various brands like Maruti Ritz, Fair One Cream, Pizza Hut.

Puri's father died in October 2020 following a heart attack.

== Personal life ==
Puri was in a 9 year-long relationship with a woman from Agra when he was in 10th standard. However the couple broke up after he left home to pursue his acting career.

== Career ==
=== 2013–2017: Initial struggles ===
Puri made his acting debut on television as Ajay Tiwari in Dil Ki Nazar Se Khoobsurat (2013) on Sony TV. Following a cameo in Colors TV's Rangrasiya, he bagged his first leading role in the musical romantic drama Phir Bhi Na Maane...Badtameez Dil on Star Plus opposite Asmita Sood as Abeer Malhotra, a successful charming rockstar. Although the show ran for just 5 months, he gained recognition for his role as Abeer that earned him a Best Fresh New Face (Male) nomination at Indian Telly Awards. The show first aired on TV and later on Hotstar.

In 2016, Puri starred as Satyendra Sharma opposite Hiba Nawab in Swastik Pictures' Meri Saasu Maa on Zee TV. He next appeared as Arjun Shastri in Yash A Patnaik's fantasy TV series Naagarjuna – Ek Yoddha (2016–2017) on Life OK.

=== 2018–2021: Rise to prominence ===
From 2018 to 2019, Puri had his breakthrough role in the starring role of Mahir Sehgal / Mihir Sippi in Ekta Kapoor's notable supernatural TV series Naagin 3 alongside Surbhi Jyoti, which earned him a household name. He won the Best Actor Male (Critics) category at Gold Awards and received nominations for Best Actor Male (Popular) and Best Onscreen Jodi (Popular) at Indian Telly Awards.

In 2019, Puri ventured into discography with Peerh Meri co-starring Anita Hassanandani. He participated in Khatra Khatra Khatra and the fifth season of Kitchen Champion on Colors TV. He also appeared in the fourth season of Box Cricket League.

Puri next reteamed with Ekta Kapoor for the romantic mystery thriller Bepanah Pyaar (2019–2020) on Colors TV, playing Raghbir Malhotra alongside Aparna Dixit and Ishita Dutta. In 2020, he appeared in the music videos Teri Aankhon Mein and Teri Aankhon Mein Dance Cover. In late-2020, he was roped in opposite Nikki Sharma in Zee TV's Brahmarakshas 2, marking a hat-trick of his collaborations with Kapoor. However, the show culminated within five months due to low viewership.

=== 2022–present: Film debut ===
In 2023, Puri made his Bollywood debut with the film Yaariyan 2 co-starring Divya Khosla Kumar and Meezaan Jafri. However the film was a box office failure.

== In the media ==
In 2018, Puri was ranked first in Times of India's Most Desirable Men on TV List.

== Filmography ==
Year	Title	Role	Language	Notes	Ref.
2023	Yaariyan 2	Bajrang Das Khatri	Hindi	Bollywood Debut	

=== Television ===
Year	Title	Role	Ref.
2013	Dil Ki Nazar Se Khoobsurat	Ajay Tiwari	
2014	Rangrasiya	Samir	
2015	Phir Bhi Na Maane...Badtameez Dil	Abeer Malhotra	
2016	Meri Saasu Maa	Satyendra Sharma	
2016–2017	Naagarjuna – Ek Yoddha	Arjun Shastri	
2017	Iss Pyaar Ko Kya Naam Doon? 3	Sushant	
2018–2019	Naagin 3	Mahir Sehgal/Mihir Sippi	
2019	Kitchen Champion 5	Contestant	
2019	Khatra Khatra Khatra	Contestant	
2019	Box Cricket League 4	Contestant	
2019–2020	Bepanah Pyaar	Raghbir Malhotra	
2020–2021	Brahmarakshas 2 - Jaag Utha Shaitaan	Angad Mehra	
2022	Naagin: Basant Panchami Special	Mihir Sippi	

=== Special appearances ===
Year	Title	Notes	Ref.
2015	Nach Baliye 7	Abeer	
2015	Yeh Hai Mohabbatein	Abeer	
2015	Saath Nibhaana Saathiya	Abeer	
2015	Diya Aur Baati Hum	Abeer	
2015	Yeh Rishta Kya Kehlata Hai	Abeer	
2015	Dosti... Yaariyan... Manmarziyan	Abeer	
2016	Kumkum Bhagya	Satyendra	
2016	Jamai Raja	Satyendra	
2016	Sarojini - Ek Nayi Pehal	Satyendra	
2017	Kalash - Ek Vishwaas	Arjun	
2018	Bigg Boss 12	Mahir	
2019	Rising Star 3	Himself	
2019	Dance Deewane 2	Himself	
2019	MTV Ace of Space 2	Himself	
2020	Choti Sarrdaarni	Raghbir	
2020	Bahu Begum	Raghbir	
2020	Bigg Boss 13	Raghbir	

=== Music videos ===
Year	Title	Singer(s)	Ref.
2019	Peerh Meri	Himself	
2020	Teri Aankhon Mein	Darshan Raval, Neha Kakkar	
2022	Chaha Hai Tujhko	Sanjeev Rathod	
2022	Hora Nu	Himself, Sara Gurpal	
2023	Allah	Himself	

== Awards and nominations ==
Year	Award	Category	Show	Result	Ref.
2016	Indian Telly Awards	Best Fresh New Face (Male)	Phir Bhi Na Maane...Badtameez Dil	Nominated	
2019	Indian Telly Awards	High Rated Show (Popular)	Naagin 3	Won	
2019	Indian Telly Awards	Best Onscreen Jodi (Popular) (With Surbhi Jyoti)	Naagin 3	Nominated	
2019	Gold Awards	Best Actor Male (Critics)	Naagin 3	Won	
2020	Gold Glam and Style Awards	Stylish Actor (Male) – TV	—N/a	Won	
