= Shweta Gautam =

Indian television actress

- Occupation: Actress
- Years active: 1994–present
- Spouse: Afzaal Khan (m. 2017)

Shweta Gautam is an Indian television actress.

== Filmography ==
=== Films ===
Year	Film	Role
1994	Janma Janma	Praya
2000	Sant Gyaneshwar	
2004	Sau Jhooth Ek Sach	Lakshmi

=== Television ===
Year	Serial	Role	Channel
1997	Saturday Suspense – Junoon	Episode 7	Zee TV
1998	Rishtey – Mujrim	Episode 44	Zee TV
1998	Saturday Suspense	Episode 88	Zee TV
1998	Om Namah Shivay		DD National
1998	Jai Ganga Maiya	Maharani Kayadhu	DD National
1998–1999	Kora Kagaz	Yogeeta	Star Plus
2000–2001	Basera		Zee TV
2001	Aane Wala Pal		DD Metro
2001	Karam		Sony SAB
2001–2002	Jai Santoshi Maa	Devi Siddhi	Zee TV
2001–2003	Gharana		Zee TV
2004	Hum Sab Baraati		Zee TV
2004	Tum Bin Jaaoon Kahaan	Madhu	Zee TV
2005–2006	Sinndoor Tere Naam Ka	Tara Raizada / Tara Rahul Malhotra	Zee TV
2006	Woh Hue Na Hamare	Payal	DD National
2006–2007	Kulvaddhu	Bindiya	Sony Entertainment Television
2007–2008	Har Ghar Kuch Kehta Hai		Zee TV
2007–2008	Solhah Singaarr	Urvashi Chaturvedi / Urvashi Shiv Chopra	Sahara One
2008–2009	Ranbir Rano		Zee TV
2009	Pehchaan	Shyama	DD National
2009	Ghar Ki Lakshmi Betiyann		Zee TV
2009	Ganesh Leela		Sahara One
2010	Yeh Pyar Na Hoga Kam	Mridula Brijbhushan Mathur	Colors TV
2011	Love U Zindagi	Amanpreet	Star Plus
2011	Ek Nayi Chhoti Si Zindagi	Indrani	Zee TV
2011	Haar Jeet		Imagine TV
2012	Adaalat – Qatil Saas: Part 1 & Part 2	Ketki Patel (Episode 144 & Episode 145)	Sony Entertainment Television
2012	Teri Meri Love Stories		Star Plus
2012–2013	Tujh Sang Preet Lagai Sajna	Shakuntala	Sahara One
2012–2014	The Buddy Project	Mrs. Rastogi	Channel V India
2013	Mahabharat	Maharani Sudharma	Star Plus
2013–2014	Ek Nanad Ki Khushiyon Ki Chaabi – Meri Bhabhi	Kamini Purushottam Srivastav	Star Plus
2014	CID – Khooni Khel	Rohini (Episode 1096)	Sony Entertainment Television
2014	Ek Mutthi Aasmaan	Kavita Sanjay Diwan	Zee TV
2015	Bhagyalaxmi	Lata Agreem Prajapati	&TV
2016	Bhakton Ki Bhakti Mein Shakti	Episode 4	Life OK
2016	Krishnadasi		Colors TV
2016–2017	Sasural Simar Ka	Saroj Ravikant Agarwal	Colors TV
2017–2018	Aadat Se Majboor	Samiksha's Mother	Sony SAB
2018	Bepannah	Madhu Arora	Colors TV
2018	Qayamat Ki Raat	Savitri Prithvi Singh Suryavanshi	Star Plus
2019	Laal Ishq		&TV
2019	Bahu Begum	Safeena	Colors TV
2019–2020	Pyaar Ki Luka Chuppi		Dangal
2020–2021	Hamari Wali Good News	Advocate Poonam Agnihotri	Zee TV
2021	Baalveer Returns	Radha Pandey	Sony SAB
2021	Zindagi Mere Ghar Aana	Pammi Sakhuja / Pammi Baljeet Prasad	Star Plus
2021–2022	Nima Denzongpa	Suman Dinesh Goenka	Colors TV
2021–2022	Tere Bina Jiya Jaye Na	Sudha Vishwanath Chaturvedi	Zee TV
2023	Ajooni	Kaveri Tejendra Singh Bagga	Star Bharat
2023	Sindoor Ki Keemat	Jaya Rakesh Sharma	Dangal
2023–2024	Imlie	Meera Kunal Singh Chaudhary	Star Plus
2024	Pukaar – Dil Se Dil Tak	Padma Kishorilal Sharma	Sony Entertainment Television
2024–2025	Suman Indori	Hema Sharma	Colors TV
2026–present	Udne Ki Aasha	Devika	Star Plus
