= Basera =

Basera is a Hindi-language word meaning "abode" and may refer to:

- Baseraa, a 1981 Indian Hindi-language film
- Basera (DD1 TV series), a drama-series that aired on DD National channel in early 90s
- Basera (2000 TV series), a serial that aired on the Indian satellite television network Zee TV in 2000
- Basera (2009 TV series), a television series premiered on NDTV Imagine in 2009
