= Tulsi – Hamari Badi Sayani =

Indian Drama Family television series

- Genre: Drama; Family
- Created by: Vipul D. Shah
- Screenplay by: Aakriti Atreja; Virat Basoya (dialogue)
- Directed by: Ismail Umar Khan; Kaushik Ghatak; Sagar Kagara
- Starring: Harithi Joshi; Aparna Dixit; Dishank Arora
- Theme music composer: Sreejone (background music)
- Opening theme: Tulsi
- Country of origin: India
- Original language: Hindi
- No. of seasons: 1
- No. of episodes: 204

Production
- Producers: Vipul D. Shah; Sanjiv Sharma
- Cinematography: Pushyank Gowde
- Editor: Janak Chauhan
- Camera setup: Multi-camera
- Running time: 22-24 minutes
- Production company: Optimystix Entertainment

Original release
- Network: Dangal TV
- Release: 1 July 2024 – 22 February 2025

Tulsi – Hamari Badi Sayani (transl. Tulsi – Is Our Great Companion) is a 2024 Indian drama television series which was aired on Dangal on 1 July 2024 under the banner of Optimystix Entertainment. It replaced the television series Janani – AI Ki Kahani. It stars Harithi Joshi, Aparna Dixit and Dishank Arora.

== Plot ==
Raghuveer and Janki are happily married couple but their happiness is short-lived when they had a daughter born Vrinda but is kidnapped and sold by their own relatives. Vrinda is raised as Tulsi by slum people Bunty, Kajri and Gamla who does robbery for their living. Tulsi doesn't knows but vows to find her parents.

== Cast ==
=== Main ===
- Harithi Joshi as Vrinda "Tulsi" Thakur: Raghuveer and Janaki's daughter; Veena and Jeetendra's granddaughter (2024-2025)
- Aparna Dixit as double role
  - Janaki Raghuveer Thakur: Raghuveer's wife; Vrinda's mother; Veena and Jeetendra's daughter-in-law (2024-2025)
  - Jaya Mathur: Janaki's lookalike; Utkarsh's wife; Vedant's mother (2024)
- Dishank Arora as double role
  - Raghuveer "Dheeru" Thakur: Veena and Jeetendra's elder son; Munna's twin brother; Manshi and Vimala's foster-son; Rakesh's foster-brother; Janaki's husband; Vrinda's father (2024–2025)
  - Munna "Veeru" Thakur: Veena and Jeetendra's younger son; Raghuveer's twin brother; Rakesh's half-brother; Vrinda's uncle; Maala's husband; Chameli's step-father; Raja's father (2024–2025) (Dead)
- Manas Shah as Vikram "Vicky" Sarkar: Ratanlal's elder son; Janaki's childhood friend (2025)

=== Recurring ===
- Anjali Gupta as Veena Thakur; Jeetendra's wife; Raghuveer and Munna's mother; Vrinda and Raja's grandmother(2024)
- Unknown as Jeetendra Thakur; Veena's husband; Raghuveer and Munna's father; Vrinda and Raja's grandfather(2024)
- Unknown as beby Raja Thakur; Maala and Raghuveer's son; Vrinda's half-brother (2025)
- Unknown as Manshi Raichand; Vimala's husband; Rakesh's step-father; Jeetendra's best friend (2024)
- Hetal Yadav as Vimala Raichand: Manshi's wife; Raghuveer and Munna's adopted mother; Rakesh's mother; Vrinda's adoptive-grandmother (2024-2025)
- Tushar Kawale as Rakesh Raichand: Vimala's biological son; Raghuveer's foster-younger brother; Urmila's husband; Vrinda's uncle (2024-2025)
- Alka Singh as Urmila Rakesh Raichand: Rakesh's wife; Vrinda's aunt (2024)
- Kiara Chauhan as Chameli / Fake Vrinda Raichand: Maala's daughter; Raja's half-sister; Vrinda's rival (2024)
- Monica Khanna as Maala Thakur: Chameli and Raja's mother; Tulsi's fake mother; Munna's wife (2024-2025)
- Kunal Sheth as Bunty: Kajri and Gamla's brother; Tulsi's friend(2024-2025)
- Morvin Vakare as Gamla: Bunty and Kajri's brother; Tulsi's best friend (2024-2025)
- Kajal Sharma as Kajri: Bunty and Gamla's sister; Tulsi's best friend (2024-2025)
- Tanu as the Raichand family's maid(2024)
- Shubham Sapre as Lawyer Pramod Desai(2024)
- Yash Pandit as Utkarsh Mathur: Jaya's husband; Vedant's father(2024)
- Yachit Sharma as Vedant Mathur; Jaya and Utkarsh's son; Tulsi's friend(2024)

== Production ==
=== Development and casting ===
The series was announced by Optimystix Entertainment in June 2024 and it was confirmed by Dangal TV. As child actress, Harithi Joshi had signed to play the lead role while Aparna Dixit and Dishank Arora to play the supporting role for the show

=== Release ===
The first promo of its show was released on 10 June 2024 and featured Harithi Joshi, Aparna Dixit and Dishank Arora.

== See also ==
- List of programmes broadcast by Dangal TV
