= Mann Atisundar =

Indian drama television series

- Genre: Drama; Romance
- Screenplay by: Bhavna Vyas; Anupriya Tripathi; Sonali Gupta Shrivastava
- Story by: Suzana Ghai
- Directed by: Sacchin Deo
- Starring: Tanishq Seth; Manan Joshi; Sparsh Singh Kotwal; Chinky Jaiswal; Mandeep Bamra
- Opening theme: Ati Sundar...Hota Hai Mann Atisundar
- Composer: Elvish Valentine
- Country of origin: India
- Original language: Hindi
- No. of seasons: 3
- No. of episodes: 1215

Production
- Producer: Suzana Ghai
- Production location: Mumbai
- Cinematography: Kenil Sanghvi
- Editors: Omkar Singh; Narendra Singh
- Running time: 20-21 min approx.
- Production company: Panorama Entertainment

Original release
- Network: Dangal
- Release: 24 July 2023 – present

Related
- Mann Sundar

Mann Atisundar (transl. Purest of the Heart) is an Indian Hindi-language romantic drama television series produced by Suzana Ghai under the banner of Panorama Entertainment. Premiered on 24 July 2023 on Dangal TV, it is one of the longest running Indian television soap opera. A spin-off of Mann Sundar, the series formerly starred Tanishq Seth, Manan Joshi and Sparsh Singh Kotwal. Since November 2026, it stars Vaishnavi Jaiswal and Mandeep Bamra in its third generation.

The show is being re-run on Sony TV from March 2025 to 8 August 2025 under the title Radhika Dil Se following the show's success on Dangal TV.

== Plot ==
Radhika Agarwal is an overweight but happy-go-lucky girl of a happy middle class Halwai family. Her grandmother wants her to marry whereas her cousin and best friend Kaya is an attractive girl who aspires to become model. Divyam Bansal, son of a wealthy businessman Jagmohan Bansal is a young, handsome man who is a fitness freak and a perfectionist who wants to marry a beautiful girl. Divyam and Kaya are in love.

Jagmohan and Ranjeet (Radhika's father) meet and are revealed to be best friends. They fix Divyam and Radhika's marriage with each other. Sujata (Divyam's mother) finds out that Radhika is fat and reluctantly agrees for the marriage. She believes Radhika is not fit for her son. Divyam wants to marry Kaya but she refuses to marry him. She makes Radhika believe that Divyam loves her and she falls for him. Kaya leaves for France. Finally, Radhika and Divyam marry.

After marriage Divyam mistreats Radhika and hates her because of her obesity but eventually appreciates her beautiful heart (Atisundar Man) and treats her well. Sujata hates Radhika for being fat. Eventually, Gautam a.k.a Golu (Divyam's cousin) marries Kali an illiterate, village girl. Kavita hates Kali. Kaya returns and becomes obsessed with Divyam. Sujata unsuccessfully collaborates with Kaya against Radhika. Kaya tries to kill Divyam but he is saved.

After a series of events, Radhika and Divyam confess to each other. Sujata brings Radhika's look-a-like who pushes Jagmohan from balcony. Jagmohan is paralyzed. Sujata convinces Divyam that Radhika tried to kill him and in anger he asks Radhika to leave. Distraught, Radhika leaves for Lucknow.

Sujata brings Rani who takes care of Jagmohan who is paralyzed. Kali, pregnant with Gautam's child, miscarries. Radhika returns to Kanpur and reaches Bansal House as Jagmohan's caretaker. Radhika is shocked to see Rani as Divyam's fiancé. Divyam mistreats Radhika.

Rani fakes her pregnancy with Divyam's child. Sujata forces Divyam to marry Rani. Radhika doubts Rani. Initially, Rani usurps Jagmohan's property and brings her brothers Narpat and Sarpat who torture the Bansal family. Rani blackmails Divyam to marry her. Radhika and Divyam reunite, realising their love and in order to recover the Bansal's assets. After much commotion on the day of her marriage with Divyam, Rani brings a Tantric in order to get rid of Radhika. The Tantric brought both Radhika and the family near the brink of death, but finally Radhika saves her family sending Rani to Mental asylum on the auspicious day of Dussehra. Narpat and Sarpat realise their misdeeds and consider Radhika as sister. Radhika and Divyam reunite. Radhika and Divyam confess their love.

Divyam and Radhika adopt a baby girl who turns out to be Kali and Gautam's daughter. It was revealed that as it was a girl birthed by Kali, Kavita replaced it with a stillborn one. Kali learns the truth but stays quiet. Radhika reveals the truth to everyone. An angry Kavita reveals that she did this because her son was treated unfairly by Divyam. Thus, creating a chaos at Bansal house, Dadi divides the house, dividing the families. But Radhika reunites the family. Radhika and Divyam are again separated due to Sujata.

Divyam is married to Ragini and has a son Sonu, but still remembers Radhika. Radhika, who now goes by the name Appu, has forgotten her past and has a daughter Laddu. They live with an evil woman who mistreats them. Appu is forced to work in a circus.

Appu sees this mistreatment and decides to take a flight to China. Suddenly as she is at the airport terminal waiting for her flight, Divyam comes in and tries to make her remember that she is his Radhika and not Appu. Ragini rushes to the runway and hijacks the plane to try and run Divyam over as he tries to stop Radhika from leaving. Radhika and Divyam dies in a cylinder blast caused by Sujata. The Bansal then takes in Radhya

Radhya is grown up with the Bansals and looks exact replica of Radhika for which Sujata hated her. Pratham Mittal a carefree yet kind hearted guy all set to marry his love Niharika but when his mom and dad Rajani and Omkar realised that she is not correct they trick him to marry Radhya whom they choose for him. Pratham's grandmother (Dadi) hates Radhya because of her overweight and constantly plots against her.

Yet Radhya wins everyone in the family except Dadi. Pratham and Radhya falls in love with each after various plots and twist by Dadi and Niharika for separating them.

== Cast ==
=== Main ===
- Tanishq Seth as
  - Radhika Agrawal Bansal : Ranjeet and Anuradha's daughter (2023–2025) (Dead)
  - Radhya "Laddu" Bansal Mittal: Radhika and Divyam's daughter (2025–2026)
    - Naysha Palan as child Radhya (2025)
  - Radha / Fake Radhika Bansal: A doppelganger; Sujata's accomplice; Divyam's one-sided lover (2024)
- Manan Joshi as Divyam "Munna" Bansal: Sujata and Jagmohan's son (2023–2025) (Dead)
- Sparsh Singh Kotwal as Pratham Mittal: Omkar and Rajani's younger son (2025–2026)
- Chinky Jaiswal as Radha: Santosh's daughter (2026–present)
- Mandeep Bamra as Vardhan Nagpal: Vasundhara's elder son (2026–present)

=== Recurring ===
==== Agarwals ====
- Anjali Vilas as Bhagwati Agarwal: Ranjeet and Ajeet's mother (2023-2024)
- Karan Sharma as Ranjeet Agarwal: Bhagwati's elder son (2023–2024)
- Shruthi Golap as Anuradha Agarwal: Usha's sister (2023–2024)
- Govind Khatri as Ajeet Agarwal: Bhagwati's younger son (2023)
- Shivani Thakur as Shalini Agarwal: Ajeet's wife (2023)
- Niki Lalwani / Maitri Bhanushali as Kaya Agarwal: Shalini and Ajeet's daughter; Divyam's ex-girlfriend and one-sided obsessive lover (2023) / (2024)

==== Bansals ====
- Unknown as Rajmohan Bansal: Deenayal's brother (2023)
- Ruby Thuukral / Yamini Singh / Sushma Prashant as Prabha Bansal: Rajmohan's wife (2023) / (2023–2024) / (2024–2026)
- Kapil Punjabi as Brijmohan "Brij" Bansal: Prabha and Rajmohan's elder son (2023–2026)
- Arina Dey / Mannat Saudagar as Kavita Banerjee Bansal: Brijmohan's wife (2023–2025) / (2025–2026)
- Rishab Shukla as Gautam "Golu" Bansal: Brijmohan and Kavita's son (2023–present)
- Simran Gautam / Akshita Singh Rajput as Kalwanti "Kali" Bansal: Phoolwati's daughter (2023–2024) / (2024–2026)
- Kirti Singh as Gauri Bansal: Kalwanti and Gautam's daughter (2025–2026)
  - Riddhi Sharma as child Gauri (2025)
    - Krivaa Thakkar as baby Gauri (2024–2025)
- Karan Kaushal Sharma as Jagmohan "Jaggu" Bansal; Prabha and Rajmohan's younger son (2023–2026)
- Neelakshi Naithani as Mandira Bansal: Jagmohan's late wife (2025) (Dead)
- Ankur Tyagi as Sani Bansal: Jagmohan and Mandira's son (2025)
- Lakshmi Mehta as Titli Bansal: Sani's wife (2025)
- Harshita Shukla as Sujata Dwiwedi Bansal: Jamuna's daughter (2023–2026)
- Saim Khan as Sonu Bansal (né Khanna): Ragini and Dilip's son (2025–2026)
  - Pratyaksh BS as young Sonu (2025)
- Shashi Sharma as Deendayal "Badi Dadi" Bansal: Rajmohan's sister (2023–2024)

==== Mittal family ====
- Unknown as Vishwas Mittal: Shakuntala's husband (2025) (Dead)
- Meena Naithani / Seema Anand as Shakuntala "Madhubala" Mittal: The matriarch of Mittal: Vishwas's widow (2025-2026) / (2026)
- Ajay Kumar Singh as Omkar Mittal: Shakuntala and Vishwas's son (2025–2026).
- Eva Shirali as Rajni Mittal: Vasu's half-sister (2025–2026).
- Sunny Sachdeva as Ahem Mittal: Rajni and Omkar's elder son (2025–2026)
- Srishti Mitra as Ekta Mittal (formerly Agarwal): Antara's elder sister (2025–2026)
- Shree Bhanushali as Bulbul Mittal: Ekta and Ahem's daughter (2025–2026)
- Darshna S Khandelwal as Aditi Mittal: Omkar and Rajni's daughter (2025)
- Unknown as Anand Mittal: Aditi's husband (2025)
- Unknown as Meera Mittal: Omkar's second (secret) wife (2025)
- Mandeep Kumar as Vasu Verma: Rajni's half-brother (2025–2026)
- Angshuma Saikiaa as Jyoti Verma: Vasu's wife (2025–2026)
- Hemaakshi Ujjain as Urmila Mittal: Shakuntala and Vishwas's daughter (2025–2026)

==== Nagpal family ====
- Shalini Arora as Mrs. Nagpal: Vardhan and Akash's grandmother (2026–present)
- Saurabh Agarwal as Vasundhara's husband; Vardhan and Akash's father (2026–present)
- Rajani Gupta as Vasundhara Nagpal: Vardhan and Akash's mother (2026–present)
- Vansh Sayani as Akash Nagpal: Vasundhara's younger son; Vardhan's brother (2026–present)
- Divya Lakshmi

==== Others ====
- Bharat Narang as Akshay (2023)
- Sandhya Shungloo as Jamuna Dwiwedi: Sujata's mother (2024)
- Kapil Yashraj as Swami: Radhika's fake husband (2023–2024)
- Ankita Singh Bamb as Rani Srivastava: Rashmi's daughter; Sarpat and Narpat's sister; Divyam's fake wife and one–sided obsessive lover; Radhika's enemy (2024)
- Vishal Singh as Sarpat Shrivastava: Rashmi's eldest son (2024)
- Lalit Saw as Narpat Shrivastava: Rashmi's youngest son (2024)
- Saniya Khera as Niyati: An Ichchadhari Naagin; Vishwa's lover; Divyam and Radhika's enemy (2024)
- Rachna Pakai as Phoolwati: Kalwanti's mother (2024–2025)
- Aishana Singh as Chamak: Gulab's daughter; Phoolwati's niece; Divyam's one-sided obsessive ex-lover and ex-fiancée; Radhika's enemy (2025)
- Aditya Syal as Dilip Khanna: Ragini’s ex-husband; Sonu's biological father (2025)
- Aastha Abhay as Ragini Khanna: Dilip's ex-wife; Sonu's mother; Divyam's fake wife and one-sided obsessive lover; Radhika's enemy (2025)
- Karrtik Rao as Host Misses Kanpur (2025)
- Bhavna Rokade as Laachi: A tribal woman; Divyam’s one-sided obsessive lover; Radhika's rival (2025)
- Raman Khatri as Narendra Mehta: Ms. Mehta's husband (2025)
- Parri Galaa as Ms. Mehta: Narendra's wife (2025–2026)
- Krutika Khira as Niharika Mehta aka Myra: Narendra and Ms. Mehta's daughter (2025–2026)
- Keshvee Sisodiya as Kamini: Ahem's girlfriend; Bulbul's teacher; Pratham's one-sided obsessive ex-lover; Radhya's enemy (2026)
- Anvi Tiwari as Mehak: A terrorist and Radhya's kidnapper (2026)
- Urvashi Upadhyay as Indrani Bedi: Samaira's mother; Radhya's enemy (2026)
- Unknown as Samaira Bedi: Indrani's daughter (2026)
- Aashish Chaturvedi as Montu Thakur: Kalawanti's younger brother (2026)
- Unknown as Kalawanti Thakur: Montu's elder sister (2026)
- Unknown as Bablu Thakur: Kalawanti's son (2026)
- Prachi Vaishnav as Vishkanya: Pratham's one-sided obsessive ex-lover; Radhya's enemy (2026)
- Nagina Bopche as Antara Agarwal: Ekta's younger sister; Pratham's one-sided obsessive lover; Vikas's ex-girlfriend; Radhya's enemy (2026)
- Unknown as Vikas Pandit: Antara's ex-boyfriend (2026)

=== Cameo appearances ===
- Janhvi Kapoor special appearance for promoting Mr. & Mrs. Mahi (2024)
