= Aadesh Chaudhary =

Indian television actor

- Born: Aligarh, Uttar Pradesh, India
- Occupations: Actor; Cricketer
- Years active: 2008–present

Aadesh Chaudhary (Hindi: आदेश चौधरी) is an Indian television actor. He is known for his role of Vikrant Mehta in the TV show Sasural Simar Ka on Colors TV.

== Early life ==
Chaudhary comes from Aligarh, Uttar Pradesh. He completed his education in Engineering and later entered in the acting career. While struggling to get roles in television, Chaudhary also worked in theatre along with actor Kader Khan.

== Filmography ==
=== Television ===
Year	Serial	Role
2008	Banoo Main Teri Dulhann	Viren
2010	Tere Liye	Subodh
2011	Laagi Tujhse Lagan	Digambar/Munna
2011	Bhagyavidhaata	Ratan
2012	Punar Vivah	Aman
2012	Main Lakshmi Tere Aangan Ki	Aditya
2012	Byaah Hamari Bahoo Ka	Satya
2013	Desh Ki Beti Nandini	Sushant Raghuvanshi
2014	Doli Armaano Ki	Amrit
2014	Sasural Simar Ka	Vikrant
2015	Yeh Dil Sun Raha Hai	Viraj
2015	Diya Aur Baati Hum	Chandu
2018	Laal Ishq	Vivek
2023	Maitree	Yash Thakur
2026–present	Yeh Rishta Kya Kehlata Hai	Samar Damani
