= Bepanah Pyaar =

Indian television series

- Genre: Drama; Romance; Mystery; Suspense; Thriller
- Created by: Ekta Kapoor
- Developed by: Ekta Kapoor
- Screenplay by: Mrinal Jha; Shilpa D'Melo; Dialogues; Hemant Bahal
- Story by: Mitali Bhattacharya; Arundhati Sharma; Vishal Maurya
- Directed by: Deepak Chavan; Vishal Singh
- Creative directors: Chloe Qureshi (Balaji); Sujhata Rao (Shalu); Nitin Dhall
- Starring: See below
- Theme music composer: Binod Ghimire
- Country of origin: India
- Original language: Hindi
- No. of seasons: 1
- No. of episodes: 190

Production
- Producers: Ekta Kapoor; Shobha Kapoor
- Production locations: Mumbai, India
- Editors: Vikas Sharma; Vishal Sharma; Sandip Bhatt
- Camera setup: Multi-camera
- Running time: 12-27 minutes
- Production company: Balaji Telefilms

Original release
- Network: Colors TV
- Release: 3 June 2019 – 28 February 2020

Bepanah Pyaarr (transl. Endless love) is an Indian romantic mystery television series produced by Ekta Kapoor. It premiered on June 3, 2019 on Colors TV. It stars Pearl V Puri, Aparna Dixit and Ishita Dutta. The show ended on February 28, 2020 after 190 episodes; it was replaced by Pavitra Bhagya.

== Plot ==
After the loss of his wife Bani, Raghbir is ready to marry his friend from childhood, Misha. Still missing Bani, he ruminates on their connection and has nightmares about the accident in which Bani was killed when a railing broke way. Sukanya Rai Singhania, who claims Raghbir wedded her in London, attends the wedding. As a result, the wedding is called off despite his denial of any link between them.

Raghbir enlists the help of Pragati, a new employee in his office, to discover the truth. They end up falling in love and marrying as they uncover Sukanya's deception. Raghbir tells her that he still has feelings for Bani. Pragati discovers that Bani was pregnant at the time of her death, and that one of Raghbir's relatives tampered with the railing to cause it to give way. She falls in love with Raghbir and believes Sanket's accident was caused by Bani's murderer.

When Pragati discovers a tape recorder on which Raghbir threatens to kill Bani, she is taken aback. Bani, who did not die but underwent plastic surgery and returned as Pragati to exact her revenge on Raghbir, was revealed to be Pragati. She later learns that the hooded figure is not Raghbir. Harshit and his accomplice are found guilty of causing Bani's accident. Pragati, on the other hand, discovers Kunti is the brains behind the operation.

Intoxicated, Raghbir realises his love for her (unaware she is his first love Bani) and wants to give their marriage a chance. Pragati decides to tell Raghbir the truth about her false identity "Pragati," which he has recently discovered and despises her for. Saahas comes in to assist her. Pragati reappears, claiming 51 percent of the property that was a pre-accident agreement between Raghbir and her company.

Saahas, on the other hand, wants to separate pragati and Raghbir since he has loved pragati since they met in college. Raghbir, meantime, learns of pragati's love and Kunti's crimes. He is in danger of becoming involved in an accident. If pragati wants Saahas to cure Raghbir, he asks her to marry him. She concurs. Raghbir battles Saahas after learning the truth, injuring his skull, and finally losing his memories. later kunti say wrong things about pragati to raghbir and he just shouts on her. all this is being recorded by the whole family that kunti is telling all fake information about pragati to raghbir. later harshit decide to join pragati and leave his mother kunti for betraling him for money and tells whole thing to pragati. pragati take raghbir to manali where she fall from the cliff and soon raghbir recalls everything and they reunite.

== Cast ==
=== Main ===
- Pearl V Puri as Raghbir Malhotra: Devraj and Aditi's son; Kunti's step-son; Nakul, Shefali and Priya's brother; Harshit's half-brother; Deepjot'a paternal nephew; Gopinath's maternal nephew; Amitabh and Sonarika's grandson; Bani/Pragati's husband; Jeevika and Hannah's brother-in-law (2019-2020)
- Aparna Dixit / Ishita Dutta as Bani Malhotra / Pragati Malhotra: Jeevika and Hannah's sister; Raghbir's wife; Devraj and Aditi's daughter-in-law; Harshit, Nakul, Shefali and Priya's sister-in-law (2019) / (2019-2020) (after plastic surgery)

=== Recurring ===
- Kulbir Badesron as Sonarika Malhotra: Amitabh's wife; Devraj and Deepjot's mother; Kunti and Aditi's mother-in-law: Harshit, Raghbir, Nakul, Shefali and Priya's grandmother (2019-2020)
- Ashish Kaul as Devraj Malhotra: Amitabh and Sonarika's son; Deepjot's brother; Kunti and Aditi's husband; Harshit, Raghbir, Nakul, Shefali and Priya's father; Tina, Bani/Pragati, Kavya and Karan's father-in-law; Gopinath's brother-in-law (2019-2020)
- Sudha Chandran as Kunti Malhotra (née Shah): Devraj's first wife; Amitabh and Sonarika daughter-in-law; Deepjot's sister-in-law; Harshit's mother; Raghbir, Nakul, Shefali and Priya's step-mother; Tina's mother-in-law (2019-2020)
- Ekta Sharma as Aditi Malhotra (née Salgaonkar): Gopinath's sister; Devraj's second wife; Amitabh and Sonarika's daughter-in-law; Deepjot's sister-in-law; Raghbir, Nakul, Shefali and Priya's mother; Harshit's step-mother; Bani/Pragati, Kavya and Karan's mother-in-law (2019-2020)
- Manoj Chandila as Harshit Malhotra: Devraj and Kunti's son; Aditi's step-son; Raghbir, Nakul, Shefali and Priya's half-brother; Amitabh and Sonarika's grandson; Tina's husband (2019-2020)
- Tanvi Thakkar as Tina Malhotra (née Shukla): Harshit's wife; Devraj and Kunti's daughter-in-law; Raghbir, Nakul, Shefali and Priya's sister-in-law (2019-2020)
- Adhik Mehta as Nakul Malhotra: Devraj and Aditi's son; Kunti's step-son; Raghbir, Shefali and Priya's brother; Harshit's half-brother; Deepjot's paternal nephew; Gopinath's maternal nephew; Amitabh and Sonarika's grandson; Kavya's husband (2019-2020)
- Mehak Ghai as Shefali Malhotra: Devraj and Aditi's daughter; Kunti's step-daughter; Raghbir, Nakul Rohan and Priya's sister; Harshit's half-sister; Deepjot's paternal niece; Gopinath's maternal niece; Amitabh and Sonarika's granddaughter; Karan's wife (2019-2020)
- Sophiya Kiran Singh as Priya Malhotra: Devraj and Aditi's daughter; Kunti's step-daughter; Raghbir, Nakul Rohan and Shefali's sister; Harshit's half-sister; Deepjot's paternal niece; Gopinath maternal niece; Amitabh and Sonarika's granddaughter (2019-2020)
- Neha Chandra as Deepjot Malhotra: Amitabh and Sonarika's daughter; Devraj's sister; Kunti and Aditi's sister-in-law; Harshit, Raghbir, Nakul, Shefali and Priya aunt (2019-2020)
- Sachin Parikh as Gopinath Salgaonkar: Aditi's brother; Devraj's brother-in-law; Raghbir, Nakul, Shefali and Priya's uncle; Shalini's husband; (2019-2020)
- Chitrapama Banerjee as Shalini Salgaonkar: Gopinath's wife; Aditi's sister-in-law; Raghbir, Nakul, Shefali and Priya's aunt (2019-2020)
- Tasneem Ali as Ayesha Dixit: Mihir's wife; Devansh's mother (2019-2020)
- Nikhlesh Rathore as Devansh Dixit: Mihir and Ayesha's son (2019-2020)
- Darpan Srivastav as Prashant Ahuja: Sanket's uncle (2019-2020)
- Mandeep Bamra as Sanket Ahuja: Prashant's nephew (2019-2020)
- Manish Goplani as Dr. Saahas Banerjee: Bani's one-sided lover (2019-2020)
- Ravi Gossain as Gulshan Saxena: Pragati's foster-father (2019-2020)
- Mahira Sharma as Misha Oberoi: Raghaveer's childhood friend (2019-2020)
- Ankur Verma as Raghaveer Sharma: Misha's childhood friend (2019-2020)
- Karan Thakur as Angad Singh (2019-2020)
- Saurabbh Ravi Dutta as Ravi: Dev’s assistant and office employee (2020)
- Devika Singh as Sukanya Raisinghania: Raghbir's fake wife (2019)
- Ahmad Harhash as Rohan Malhotra: Shefali's brother (2019-2020)
