= Lafafi =

- Genre: Drama
- Written by: Ravi Deep
- Directed by: Ravi Deep
- Starring: Neena Cheema; Rajinder Kashyap; Pramod Kalia; Amarjeet Grover
- Country of origin: India
- Original language: Punjabi
- No. of seasons: 1
- No. of episodes: 6

Production
- Running time: 30 minutes

Original release
- Network: Jalandhar Doordarshan
- Release: 16 December 1993 – 20 January 1994

Lafafi is an Indian Punjabi-language television series broadcast by Jalandhar Doordarshan from 1993 to 1994. The first episode was telecast on 16 December 1993. The serial depicts the struggle of an ordinary girl from a low class family. Who seeks to find a respectable place in society and finds herself in the heart and life of the person who deserts her after having seduced her.

== Plot ==
Lafafi lives with her family — her father, an alcoholic; her mother, who is ill; and her disabled younger brother — and earns a living by making and selling paper bags in the local market of a small town. Of plain appearance, she faces frequent ridicule and unwanted advances from the shopkeepers she deals with.

Chaman, owner of a grocery shop, being a person with large heart by nature, helps Lafafi financially whenever she faces a crisis. This does not mean that he has a special consideration or soft corner for her. When Lafafi's drunk father is arrested, Lafafi seeks Chaman's help in getting him released from police custody. In some moments of weakness Chaman and Lafafi become physically involved.

The local doctor targets Chaman when he refuses to give him bribe. To avoid being arrested for malpractice, Chaman flees from the town and joins his friend Gora, a small-time travel agent in a metropolitan city. Chaman joins Gora's profession and due to his daring nature and enterprise prospers fast as a travel agent, now known and called by all as C.L.

When Lafafi's parents come to know that she is pregnant, they try to get rid of her by marrying her to a retarded person. Lafafi also leaves the town and somehow reaches Chaman who blatantly refuses to accept her and her child. But Lafafi does not give in and continues to fight in her own way for her rightful place in Chaman' life and the society that had never been kind to her.

== Cast ==
- Neena Cheema as Lafafi
- Rajinder Kashyap as Chaman (CL)
- Pramod Kalia as Gora
- Amarjeet Grover as Lafafi's father
- Daljit Kaur as Lafafi's mother
- Saurabh Shaili as Lafafi's brother
- Sudeshna Bakshi as C.L.'s employee
