= Godavari Ne Kay Kele =

Short Story by Hari Narayan

Godavari Ne Kay Kele is a short story by eminent Marathi writer Hari Narayan Apte. The story depicts the courage and determination of a young girl from a humble family.

== Telefilm ==
A telefilm based on the story was produced by Sahyadri Channel of Doordarshan in 2010.

=== Plot ===
Godavari learns that her younger brother Deepu suffers from an eye disease which may cause blindness. The only solution is operation at a costly hospital at Mumbai which is beyond the reach of the poor family. However, Godavari takes Deepu to Mumbai and, promising to serve the surgeon throughout her life, convinces him to operate upon Deepu's eyes. The surgeon, after a successful operation, decides to keep Godavari with him for life, as his daughter–in-law.

=== Cast ===
- Vivek Lagu
- Bharati Patil

=== Credits ===
- Direction ... Ravi Deep
- Cameraman ... P. Srinivasan
- Dialogues ... Prasad Pundit
