= Mann Sundar =

Indian drama television series

- Genre: Drama; Romance
- Written by: Dialogues: Sonali Gupta Shrivastava
- Screenplay by: Bhavna Vyas; Anupriya Tripathi
- Story by: Vivek Behl
- Directed by: Faheim Ahmad Inamdar
- Starring: Shruti Anand; Shivam Khajuria; Nancy Roy; Dev Aditya; Dhruti Mangeshkar; Shubh Sharma
- Theme music composer: Nilesh Kehrir; Elvish Valentine; Anuj Shashank
- Opening theme: Dil Se Dekho Toh Jaano Kitna Hai Mann Sundar
- Country of origin: India
- Original language: Hindi
- No. of seasons: 3
- No. of episodes: 1763

Production
- Producer: Suzana Ghai
- Production location: Mumbai
- Cinematography: Sudesh Kotian; Jeetendra Manohar Kadam
- Running time: 20-21 min approx.
- Production company: Panorama Entertainment

Original release
- Network: Dangal
- Release: 18 October 2021 – present

Related
- Mann Atisundar

Mann Sundar (transl. Beauty of the Heart) is an Indian romantic drama television series produced by Panorama Entertainment and premiered on 18 October 2021 on Dangal. One of the longest running Indian television soap opera, the series previously starred Shruti Anand, Shivam Khajuria, Nancy Roy and Dev Aditya in the first and second season. It currently stars Dhruti Mangeshkar and Shubh Sharma in the third season. The series is directed by Faheim Ahmad Inamdar and the production is headed by Suzana Ghai.

== Plot 1 ==
Ruchita is idealistic and independent. She works at her father's friend's company, owned by Naresh Goyal. Naresh has two sons, Prateek and Nihar. Prateek is married to Ritu, who has a younger sister, Amrita. Nihar is in love with Amrita and wishes to marry her. But, the Goyal family forcibly decides to have Ruchita and Nihar marry. Nihar opposes the marriage and tries to elope with Amrita but fails as Amrita leaves to London. Nihar reluctantly marries Ruchita and blames her for the marriage and starts to hate her.

Nihar's mother, Poonam, and his grandmother (Dadi) do not accept Ruchita due to her dark skin; they try to separate her from Nihar. After many struggles, Nihar starts to love Ruchita. After some time, Amrita returns to separate them. She collaborates with Poonam and Dadi to expel her from the house by framing her for Dadi's accident. When Ruchita discovers Amrita and Dadi's truth, and she tries to expose them. Amrita poisons Ruchita making the family believe that Ruchita is dead. Ruchita survives and scares Amrita as a ghost. Amrita fakes her pregnancy causing Nihar to announce his marriage with her. Dadi realizes her mistake and accepts Ruchita and helps her to expose Amrita. Ruchita exposes Amrita. Nihar ends his relationship with Amrita and Ruchita expels Amrita.

After a while, Amrita seeks revenge and fakes her own death, leading to Nihar's arrest. Meera, Amrita's mother, turns Ritu against the Nihar. Ritu destroys all evidence that would have proven Nihar innocent. Ruchita discovers Amrita and Meera's true plot. She exposes Amrita and Meera and has them arrested. Nihar is released on bail.

Preeti, Poonam and Naresh's long-lost daughter, enters the family and seeking revenge. She creates problems for Dadi who had hidden the truth about her existence from the family. Ruchita discovers this and exposes Preeti and Dadi's truth to everyone. Dadi reveals how her uncle did not accept Preeti because she was a girl. The family accepts Preeti. Preeti wants to cheat the Goyal family by capturing their estate. Preeti's machinations divide Prateek and Nihar. Ruchita exposes Preeti's plans. Preeti is confined to a mental asylum.

Ruhi and Juhi are sisters who grew up in the Goyal family and are the daughters of Ruchita and Nahar. Ruhi is a dark-skinned and shy girl while Juhi is fair-skinned and vivacious. Ruhi ends up marrying Nahar Goenka. Sumitra (Nahar's grandmother) hates her for her dusky skin and continuously plots against her. Juhi marries Nahar's stepbrother Samar Goenka.

Slowly the Goenka's accept the sisters but not Dadi. Nahar and Ruhi had two children a son Ruhan and a daughter Ruchita named after Ruhi's mother Ruchita. Juhi has a daughter Jhanvi. Nahar and Ruhi dies in an accident. Nahar wrote a letter stating his wish for his children being raised by Goyals

Ruchita (Dhruti Mangeshkar) is grown up to be exact replica of Ruchita. Ruchita is shy kind hearted while Jhanvi is grownup to be clever.

== Cast ==
=== Main ===
- Shruti Anand as Ruchita Nihar Goyal (formerly Mittal): Shreedhar and Usha's eldest daughter; Vivek's sister; Nihar's wife; Ruhi and Juhi's mother (2021–2023; 2024) (Dead) (appears in flashback after 2023)
  - Pataal Devi in Ruchita's form (2023)
- Shivam Khajuria as triple role
  - Nihar Goyal: Naresh and Poonam's eldest son; Prateek and Preeti's brother; Ruchita's husband; Ruhi and Juhi's father (2021–2023; 2024) (Dead) (appears in flashbacks after 2023)
    - Pataal Devi in Nihar's form (2022)
  - Babu: Lalita's son; Apsara's husband; Nihar's look-alike (2023) (Dead)
  - Terrorist: Nihar's look-alike who works with Monica (2023) (Dead)
- Nancy Roy as Ruhi Nahar Goenka (formerly Suhani Goyal): Nihar and Ruchita's elder daughter; Juhi's sister; Nahar's wife; Ruhaan and Ruchita's mother (2023–2026) (Dead)
  - Sukoon in Ruhi's form and also possessed her spirit in Ruhi's body (2025)
  - Yashasvi Prajapati as Child Ruhi (2023)
- Dev Aditya as double role
  - Nahar Goenka: Ratan and Nandini's elder son; Soni's step-son; Samar and Avni's step-brother; Ruhi's husband; Ruhaan and Ruchita's father (2023–2026) (Dead)
  - Yuvraj Sahani: A Businessman; Nahar's look-alike; Agni's accomplice; Ruhi and Nahar's rival; Ruhi's one-sided obsessive ex-lover and ex-fiancé (2026)
- Dhruti Mangeshkar as Ruchita Nihaal Maheshwari (formerly Goenka): Ruhi and Nahar's younger daughter; Ruhaan's sister; Nihaal's wife (2026–present)
  - Jashvi Chauhan as Child Ruchita (2026)
- Shubh Sharma as Nihaal Maheshwari: Purnima and Mahendra's elder son; Nakul and Aarav's brother; Jahnvi and Anamika's ex-fiancé; Ruchita's husband (2026–present)
  - Aditya Maheshwari: Purnima and Mahendra's son; Nihaal's twins brother (2026)(Dead)

=== Recurring ===
==== The Maheshwari family ====
- Mohan Kant as Bhairav Pratap Maheshwari: Bhanu Pratap's younger brother; Subhadra's husband; Mahendra's father (2026–present)
- Geeta Tyagi as Subhadra Maheshwari: Bhairav Pratap's wife; Mahendra's mother (2026-present)
- Manu Malik as Mahendra Maheshwari: Subhadra and Bhairav Pratap's son; Purnima's husband; Nihal Nakul and Aarav's father (2026–present)
- Piyali Munsi as Purnima Maheshwari: Mahendra's wife; Nihal Nakul and Aarav's mother (2026–present)
- Ankur Bhardwaj as Nakul Maheshwari: Purnima and Mahendra's younger son; Nihal and Aarav's brother (2026–present)
- Vivek Anand Mishra as Aarav Maheshwari: Purnima and Mahendra's second son; Nihal and Nakul's brother; Chetna's husband; Gungun's father (2026–present)
- Dolly Kaushik as Chetna Maheshwari: Aarav's wife; Gungun's mother (2026–present)
- Dhanvi Gajara as Gungun Maheshwari: Chetna and Aarav's daughter (2026–present)

==== The Goenka family ====
- Unknown as Bhanu Pratap Goenka: Sumitra's husband (2026) (Dead)
- Reshma J Merchant as Sumitra Goenka: Bhanu Pratap's widow (2023–2026)
- Shikhar Sharma as Ratan Goenka: Bhanupratap and Sumitra's son (2023–2026)
- Sushmita Vishwas as Nandini Goenka: Ratan's first wife (2024) (Dead/Ghost)
- Jyoti Tiwari/Madhushree Sharma as Soni Goenka: Ratan's second wife (2023)/(2023–2026)
- Alisha Tunge as Avni Goenka: Ratan and Soni's elder daughter (2023–2026)
- Nitesh Parashar as Romil Goenka: Avni's husband (2023–2026)
- Milan Singh as Sheetal: Romil's girlfriend (2025–2026)
- Kavish Chauhan as Bittu Goenka: Romil and Sheetal's son (2025–2026)
- Ujjwal Sharma/Somesh Sharma as Samar Goenka: Ratan and Soni's younger son (2023–2024)/(2024–2026)
- Simran Tomar/Muskaan Katarina as Juhi Samar Goenka (formerly Goyal): Nihar and Ruchita's daughter (2023–2025)/(2025–2026)
  - Roneisha Sharma as Child Juhi (2023)
- Khushi Meena as Jahnvi "Munni" Goenka: Juhi and Samar's daughter; Ruhaan and Ruchita's cousin; Nihaal's ex-fiance (2026–present)
- Pulkit Bangia as Ruhaan Goenka: Nahar and Ruhi's elder son; Ruchita's elder brother; Anamika's husband (2026–present)
  - Yashvan Rana / Ivaan Chaudhary / Shivansh Bhanu as Child Ruhaan (2026) / (2026) / (2026)
  - Nivaan Nanda as Baby Ruhaan (2025)
- Ramanpreet Kaur Kohli as Anamika Ruhaan Goenka: Nihaal's ex-fiance; Ruhaan's wife (2026–present)
- Anju Rajiv as Rajeshwari Goenka: Sumitra's younger sister-in-law; Arjun's grandmother (2026)
- Rohan Singh as Arjun Goenka: Rajeshwari's grandson (2026)
- Nazneen Khan as Meghna Goenka: Arjun's wife (2026)
- Yami Khandelwal as Ashi Goenka: Nahar, Avni and Samar's niece (2023–2024)

==== The Goyal family ====
- Neena Cheema as Bua Sa: Mrs. Goyal's elder sister (2022)
- Mamata Luthra as Mrs. Goyal: Bua Sa's younger sister (2021–2023)
- Sanjay Bhatia as Naresh Goyal: Mrs. Goyal's son (2021–present)
- Aparna Ghoshal as double role
  - Poonam Goyal: Sambhav's aunt; Naresh's wife (2021–2026)
  - Maria Fernandes: Poonam's doppelganger (2025–2026)
- Suraj Punjabi/Sapan Chaudhary as Prateek Goyal: Poonam and Naresh's younger son (2021–2023)/(2023–2024)
- Manisha Saxena/Preeti Singhania as Ritu Goyal (formerly Goenka): Meera's adopted daughter (2021–2023)/(2023)(Dead)
- Asmi Deo as Priya Goyal: Prateek and Ritu's daughter (2021)
- Priyanka Shukla as Disha Goyal: Prateek's second wife (2023)
- Mukesh Choudhary as Pinku Goyal: Prateek and Disha's son (2023–present)
  - Kavirr Amoli as Child Pinku
    - Ayanshi Sharma as Baby Pinku (2023)
- Madhura Joshi/Manpreet Kaur as Palak Goyal: Jhalak's elder sister (2023)/(2023–2026)(Dead)
  - Malishka Malhotra: Palak's identity (2024)
- Aayushie Upadhyay as Jhalak Goyal: Palak's younger sister (2026–present)
- Ayushi Rao as Preeti Goyal: Poonam and Naresh's long-lost daughter (2022)

==== The Mittal family ====
- Kajal Khanchandani as Mrs. Mittal: Shreedhar's mother (2021–2023)
- Amitabh Ghanekar as Shreedhar Mittal: Ms. Mittal's son (2021–2022)
- Geeta Bisht as Usha Mittal: Anuradha's sister; Radhika and Kaya's aunt (2021–2022)
- Krushag Ghuge as Vivek Mittal: Shreedhar and Usha's youngest son (2021–2022)

==== Other recurring cast ====
- Shreesha Tiwari / Mousumi Debnath as Mishti: Ruhi's best friend (2026) / (2026)
- Dinesh Agarwal as Deepak (2021)
- Palak Jain as Jyoti: Ruchita's friend (2021)
- Akshay Bhagat as Ravi (2021)
- Sampark Lele as Nihar's friend (2021)
- Ayushi Khurana as Amrita Goenka: Meera's daughter (2021–2022)
- Sheetal Antani as Meera Goenka: Amrita's mother (2022)
- Ekta Sharma as Ms. Meghwal: Aanchal's aunt (2022)
- Shivanshi Das as Aanchal Meghwal: Ms. Meghwal's nephew (2022)
- Pratik Parihar as Sambhav: Poonam's nephew; Ruchita's one-sided obsessive lover (2022)
- Inder Shergill as Unknown
- Gursharanpreet Singh as Unknown
- Riya Gupta as Ritika Ahuja: A NRI (2022)
- Krishnakant Singh Bundela as Baba (2022)
- Ali Abbas as Rakesh Chauhan / Thief: Ruchita's fake husband (2023)
- Suraj Kalyankar as Thief / Goon (2023)
- Anuradha Sharma as Lalita: Babu's mother; Ruchita's rival (2023)
- Kajal Chonkar as Apsara: Babu's widow; Ruchita's rival (2023)
- Subhalaxmi Das as Guru Maa (2023)
- Abhinav Gautam as NRI Businessman: He tries to receive Juhi from Guru Maa (2023)
- Neetha Shetty as Monica Khanna (alias): A terrorist; Prateek's ex-girlfriend; Nihar's murderer (2023)
- Kunal Verma as A.C.P. Ved Vardhan: Ruchita's classmate and childhood friend (2023)
- Anasuya Chakravorty as Ruhi and Juhi's principal (2023)
- Meenakshi Gupta as Sangeeta (2023)
- Ananya Samarth as Agni Rathore: Nahar's childhood ex-girlfriend and ex-fiancé; Ruhi's rival; Sumitra's accomplice; Ruhaan's surrogate mother (2023–2026)
- Nandini Karmakar as Munni (2024) (Dead) (Used her body possessed by Nahar's mother, Nandini)
- Urmila Sharma as Palak and Jhalak's mother (2024–2026)
- Oshi Sahu as Sitara / Ruhi Goenka (fake): Ruhi's fake identity and rival; Nahar's one-sided obsessive lover; Sumitra's accomplice (2024–2025)
- Anuradha Singh as Madhubala: Ruhi and Roli's mother; Ruchita's paternal grandmother (2025)
- Simran Sharma as Roli: Madhubala's younger daughter; Ruhi's younger sister and rival; Nahar's one-sided obsessive lover and fake wife; Samar's fake wife; Ruchita's paternal aunt (2025)
- Shweta Thakur as Lisa: Pinku's one-sided obsessive lover (2025)
- Pradeep Nigam as Lal Kishor: A psychopath and serial killer; Ruhi's one-sided obsessive lover and ex-fiancé (2025)
- Swati Sharma as Sukoon Sarpal Singh: Sarpal's ex-wife; Nahar's one-sided obsessive lover and ex-fiancée; Ruhi's rival (2025) (Dead / Ghost)
- Unknown as Sarpal Singh: Sukoon's ex-husband and murderer (2025)
- Suchit Vikram Singh as Sparsh: Ruhi's best friend and ex-fiancé (2025–2026)

== Production ==
=== Casting ===
Shruti Anand and Shivam Khajuria were signed as leads, Ruchita and Nihar Goyal respectively. Geeta Bisht was cast as Usha Mittal. In 2023, Madhushree Sharma replaced Jyoti Tiwari as Soni. Since November 2023, second season began to air. Dev Aditya was signed to play this season's male lead, Nahar Goenka. In August 2025, Sunny Sachdeva joined the cast. In September, Muskaan Kataria stepped in as Juhi, replacing Simran Tomar. Ankur Bharaddwaj entered the third season as Nakul Maheshwari.

=== Release ===
The first promo was released on 2 October 2021. The first season of the show was released on 18 October 2021. Since February 2023, the show is broadcasts seven days a week.

== Spin-off ==
=== Mann Atisundar ===
After the success of Mann Sundar, it had a spin-off television series titled Mann Atisundar was launched on Dangal TV. This story is centred around Radhika, a plus-sized woman who is Ruchita's cousin, who wants to marry a man of her choice.
