= Yeh Dil Sun Raha Hai =

- Genre: Soap Opera
- Created by: Ekta Kapoor
- Screenplay by: Koel Chaudhuri; Ritu Goel; Dialogues; Vivek Rawat
- Story by: Sunjoy Shekhar; Sonali Jaffar
- Directed by: Ramesh Pandey
- Starring: See Below
- Country of origin: India
- Original language: Hindi
- No. of seasons: 1
- No. of episodes: 94

Production
- Producers: Ekta Kapoor; Shobha Kapoor
- Production locations: Patna; Mumbai
- Cinematography: Ashish Sharma
- Camera setup: Multi-camera
- Running time: 24 minutes
- Production company: Balaji Telefilms

Original release
- Network: Sony Pal
- Release: 16 October 2014 – 13 February 2015

Yeh Dil Sun Raha Hai (English: This Heart Is Listening) is an Indian soap opera, produced by Ekta Kapoor under her banner Balaji Telefilms. The show stars Aparna Dixit and Navi Bhangu. The show premiered on 16 October 2014 on Sony Pal.

== Plot ==
Yeh Dil Sun Raha Hai is a love story of two lovers set in Patna, Bihar who are destined to never be together. Purvi is an educated and highly moralistic daughter of two IAS officers. Arjun is everything she despises - uncouth, uneducated, sexist and son of Baccha Yadav, a political goon. The show explores the love story of Purvi and Arjun who study in the same college. The show brings Poorvi and Arjun somewhere together where they fall in love only to be separated later by luck.

== Cast ==
- Aparna Dixit as Purvi Arjun Singh; Arjun’s wife
- Navi Bhangu as Arjun Singh; Purvi’s husband
- Priyanka Purohit as Gauri
- Aarti Shah as Preetika Choudhary
- Roopa Ganguly as Neelima Shankar Dayal
- Kali Prasad Mukherjee as Bachcha Singh
- Seema Pandey as Arjun's Mother
- Nikhil Arya as Dr Watan Bachcha Singh
- Manraj Singh as Mrigank
- Akanksha Juneja as Tanushree
- Aadesh Chaudhary as Viraj Raichand
- Alok Narula as Naksh Shankar Dayal
- Rujut Dahiya as Vatan's brother
- Preeti Chaudhary as Sonia
- Adaa Khan as Piya
