= Rang Jaun Tere Rang Mein =

Indian Hindi language television soap opera

- Genre: Drama; Romance
- Created by: Mahesh Pandey
- Screenplay by: Mahesh Pandey; Vikram Khurana
- Story by: Mahesh Pandey; Vikram Khurana (dialogue)
- Directed by: Ismail Umar Khan; Mithesh Chithaliya
- Creative director: Mina Maqsood Alam
- Starring: Megha Ray; Angad Hasija; Karam Rajpal; Ketaki Kadam
- Theme music composer: Shreedhar Nagaraj
- Opening theme: "Rang Jaun Tere Rang Mein"
- Composers: Puneet Dixit; Isha Gor
- Country of origin: India
- Original language: Hindi
- No. of seasons: 1
- No. of episodes: 256

Production
- Producers: Rupali Guha; Kalyan Guha
- Cinematography: Nithin Venkde
- Editor: Swapnil Sudhakar Nerurkar
- Camera setup: Multi-camera
- Running time: 20–25 minutes
- Production company: Film Farm India

Original release
- Network: Dangal TV
- Release: 3 January – 29 October 2022

Rang Jaun Tere Rang Mein (Colour Me Your Colour) is an Indian Hindi television series which aired on Dangal TV. It premiered on 3 January 2022, and was produced by Film Farm India. It stars Megha Ray, Angad Hasija, Karam Rajpal, and Ketaki Kadam.

== Plot ==
Dhani Chaubey, who lives with her family in Lucknow, has an elder sister named Srishti. Businessman Kashinath Pandey has an adopted son, Dhruv. The Pandeys announce Dhruv's wedding, and they meet Srishti. Dhani and her family agree to the wedding, but the Pandeys reject Srishti.

Dhani begs them to accept Shristi, and the wedding preparations resume. Srishti receives an electric shock, and loses consciousness; her parents think that she has eloped. Dhruv marries Dhani, thinking that he is marrying Srishti. He realises that he is married to Dhani, and is angry with her. Shristi regains consciousness, but is paralysed; her parents keep Dhani's marriage a secret. Srishti wants to see Dhruv, but he is not home. Dhruv and Dhani agree that if she does not win her parents and his heart in thirty days, she will leave. On Holi, when Dhruv falls for Dhani, Shristi confronts him about marrying Dhani and unsuccessfully tries to separate them. Srishti, Roopa (Dhruv's mother) and his aunt throw Dhani into a pond, but Dhruv saves her.

Dhruv is arrested for murder, and Shristi helps the police inspector. Srishti tries to drown herself in the pond and is rescued by Rocky Pandey, the Pandeys' biological son who was kidnapped. She turns Rocky against Dhani, Dhruv and his family. Dhani and Dhruv try to buy a house, pretending to be a South Indian business couple, but Srishti stops them. Rocky forgives his parents, and they accept Shristi. She kills Rocky, and Dhani tells their family. Srishti's mother tries to kill Srishti, who says that she is pregnant with Rocky's child. Dhani learns that she is pregnant, and the family has a baby shower.

Srishti plans to kill Dhani's child. Dhani discovers this and tries to tell Dhruv, but she is hit by a car in front of him and loses consciousness. When she wakes up three days later, she learns that she has had a miscarriage. Dhruv blames Dhani for his child's death, and she leaves the house and promises to tell the family what happened.

A year later, Dhani is working at a temple. She still loves Dhruv, who has become an alcoholic and still blames her for their child's death. Dhani and Dhruv meet, but Dhruv thinks that Dhani filed a police complaint against him for the car accident. Dhani goes to their house, but Dhruv kicks her. He divorces Dhani and marries Srishti.

Srishti kidnaps Dhani and Kashinath with the help of a woman named Meena. The kidnapping is witnessed by Vaani. Vaani, who tries to reveal the truth. Srishti locks her in a cupboard, but she escapes and tells the families. Dhruv and Dhani reconcile, and Srishti tries to kill her; she falls, injuring her forehead, and is hospitalized and arrested. Srishti escapes from the hospital and beats Dhruv and Dhani with a steel rod. She kidnaps Dhani and tries to kill her. Dhruv saves Dhani, but Srishti stabs him to death with the rod. Srishti is arrested and imprisoned, but the family blames Dhani for Dhruv's death.

Dhani meets Deva, a singer and mechanic who resembles Dhruv. She hugs him, thinking that he is Dhruv. Deva tries to avoid Dhani, but decides to help her. When he visits Dhani, her family is shocked that Deva thinks he is Dhruv. Abhishek is suspicious of Deva, and tries to investigate him. The police come to the house with Dhruv's ashes. Dhruv comes to the house in spirit form, but only Deva can see him. Abhishek and Bua are greedy, and Abhishek manipulates Kashinath Pandey. Deva arrives, and Abhishek attacks him; Dhruv possesses Deva's body. Abhishek tries to confine Dhruv's spirit, which is freed by giving Dhani's hand to Deva.

=== Twenty years later ===
Dhani, Deva, Abhishek and Pooja are shown dead. Devyani Tripathi, Deva and Dhani's daughter who resembles Dhani, has grown up and lives with Kashinath and their family. Rudrapratap "Rudra" Srivastav, a wealthy, handsome businessman, is the stepson of Yashoda Srivastav. Tara, Abhishek and Pooja's daughter and Devyani's sister-in-law, marries Rajveer. Rudra and Devyani became friends and fall in love.

== Cast ==
=== Main ===
- Megha Ray as
  - Dhani Tripathi (née Chaubey): Surendra and Phooli's daughter, Srishti's younger sister, Dhruv's widow; Deva's wife; Devyani's mother, Rudra's mother-in-law (2022) (Dead)
  - Devyani Srivastav (née Tripathi): Rudra's wife, Deva and Dhani's daughter, Yashoda's step daughter-in-law and Khushi's stepmother (2022)
- Karam Rajpal as
  - Dhruv Pandey: Kashinath and Roopa's youngest son, Rocky and Abhishek's younger brother, Dhani's first husband; Srishti's ex-husband; Deva's biological brother; Surendra and Phooli's son-in-law (2022) (Dead)
  - Deva Tripathi: Anjan and Pavan's son Mahaveer's step son, Dimple, Aarav and Badal's brother; Dhruv's biological brother; Dhani's husband, Devyani's father, Rudra's father-in-law, Surendra and Phooli's son-in-law (2022) (Dead)
- Ketaki Kadam as Srishti Chaubey: Dhani's elder sister; Rocky's ex-fiancée; Dhruv's ex-wife and murderer (2022)
- Angad Hasija as Rudrapratap "Rudra" Srivastav: Devyani's husband; Khushi's father; Yashoda's stepson; Rajveer's elder stepbrother; Deva and Dhani's son-in-law (2022)

=== Recurring ===
- Sudesh Berry as Kashinath Pandey: Dhruv, Abhishek and Rocky's father; Roopa's husband, Deva's uncle Devyani and Tara's grandfather and Rudra and Rajveer's grandfather-in-law (2022)
- Shrashti Maheshwari as Tara Srivastav (née Pandey): Abhishek and Pooja's daughter; Rajveer's wife (2022)
- Reyannsh Vir Chadha as Rajveer Srivastav: Tara's husband; Rudra's younger stepbrother; Yashoda's son (2022)
- Anita Kulkarni as Yashoda Srivastav: Rudra's stepmother; Rajveer's mother; Devyani's stepmother–in–law; Tara's mother-in-law; Khushi's stepgrandmother (2022)
- Urvashi Upadhyay as Roopa Pandey: Kashinath's wife and Dhruv, Abhishek and Rocky's mother, Devyani and Tara's grandmother and Rudra and Rajveer's grandmother-in-law (2022)
- Meena Mir as Geeta Pandey a.k.a. Bua ji: Sanskriti's mother (2022)
- Udit Shukla as Abhishek Pandey: Kashinath and Roopa's elder son; Dhruv and Rocky's elder brother; Pooja's husband; Tara's father and Rajveer's father-in-law (2022) (Dead)
- Diksha Dhami as Pooja Pandey: Abhishek's wife; Dhruv and Rocky's sister-in-law; Tara's mother and Rajveer's mother-in-law (2022) (Dead)
- Chetanya Adib as Surendra Chaubey: Srishti and Dhani's father; Phooli's husband Devyani's grandfather, Dhruv and Deva's father-in-law (2022)
- Hemaakshi Ujjain as Phooli Chaubey: Srishti and Dhani's mother; Surendra's wife Devyani's grandmother, Dhruv and Deva's mother-in-law (2022)
- Tanishq Seth as Sanskriti: Bua ji's daughter (2022)
- Inderjeet Modi as Bua ji's son: Sanskriti's brother (2022)
- Iqra Sheikh as Vaani Shandilya: Bhanupratap and Gayathri's daughter
- Jaya Ojha as Meena Singh
- Manish Khanna as Raghunandan
- Satya Tiwari as Rocky Pandey: Kashinath and Roopa's second son, Dhruv and Abhishek's second brother, Srishti's ex-fiancé (2022)(Dead)
- Shyn Khurana as Maya: Rudra's former classmate and obsessive lover, Vengeful spirit, Devyani's rival (2022)(Dead)

== See also ==
- List of programmes broadcast by Dangal TV
