= Everett K. Ross =

Fictional character

- Everett K. Ross on the cover of Black Panther #6 (April 1999). Art by Joe Jusko.

Publication information
- Publisher: Marvel Comics
- First appearance: Ka-Zar #17 (September 1998)
- Created by: Kenny Martinez; Christopher Priest

In-story information
- Full name: Everett Kenneth Ross
- Species: Human
- Place of origin: Earth
- Team affiliations: National Security Agency; United States Department of State
- Supporting character of: Black Panther

Everett Kenneth Ross is a fictional character appearing in American comic books published by Marvel Comics. Primarily an ally of superhero Black Panther, the character exists within Marvel's main shared universe, known as the Marvel Universe.

Martin Freeman portrays the character in the Marvel Cinematic Universe films Captain America: Civil War (2016), Black Panther (2018), Black Panther: Wakanda Forever (2022), and the Disney+ miniseries Secret Invasion (2023).

== Publication history ==
Everett Ross debuted in Ka-Zar Vol. 3, #17, and was created by Christopher Priest and Kenny Martinez. Afterward, Ross went on to be a major character in Black Panther Vol. 3, #1-32, #34-35, #38-49, #57-58, and #62. Ross subsequently appeared in issues #1-2, #4-6, #16, #19, #21-24, #26, and #37 of Black Panther Vol. 4, and issue #7 of Black Panther Vol. 5. Outside of Black Panther, Ross had a guest role in The Uncanny X-Men Vol. 1, #387.

According to creator Christopher Priest, Ross's personality was based on that of Chandler Bing, a character from the television series Friends, while the name was inspired by the Family Ties character Alex P. Keaton. After introducing Ross in Ka-Zar, Priest chose to bring the character back in Black Panther for use as an audience surrogate who "saw Panther the way Panther had ultimately come to be seen by Marvel: Just Some Guy who was routinely overshadowed by heroes in which they were more invested".

Priest further elaborated, "Comics are traditionally created by white males for white males. I figured, and I believe rightly, that for Black Panther to succeed, it needed a white male at the center, and that white male had to give voice to the audience's misgivings or apprehensions or assumptions about this character and this book. Ross needed to be un-PC to the point of being borderline racist"; and clarified, "I don't think Ross was racist at all. I just think that his stream-of-conscious narrative is a window into things I imagine many whites say or at least think when no blacks are around; myths about black culture and behavior. I was also introducing a paradigm shift to the way Panther was to be portrayed; somebody had to give voice to the expectation of a dull and colorless character who always got his butt kicked or who was overshadowed by Thor and Iron Man suddenly knocking out Mephisto with one punch".

== Fictional character biography ==
Everett Ross was a US State Department employee, whose job was to escort foreign diplomats on American soil. As a child, Ross was not well adjusted. Obese and unloved by his mother, he was constantly bullied with his most embarrassing memory being beaten up by a girl named Natalie McPhail. He eventually left home and turned his life around by working for the government. His world changed forever when he was assigned to T'Challa, the Black Panther and ruler of Wakanda.

Everett and T'Challa faced multiple threats to Wakanda's sovereignty. Ross assists him in many of these threats. In gratitude, the Panther often risks much for Ross in return. The first threat he and Ross encounter is 'Xcon', an alliance of rogue intelligence agents backing a coup led by the Reverend Achebe.

As an expert on Wakanda, Ross worked as an adviser alongside government officials and the National Security Agency. He was part of a meeting at the White House about Wakanda.

Ross subsequently acts as a liaison for Shuri, the younger sister of Black Panther, during Shuri's first goodwill visit to the United States. When their convoy is attacked by assassins, Shuri saves Ross's life.

The World Security Council later selects Ross to prosecute the tribunal of S.H.I.E.L.D. director Maria Hill.

== Reception ==
- In 2022, CBR.com ranked Everett Ross 5th in their "10 Most Powerful Lawyers In Marvel Comics" list.

== Other versions ==
In an alternate future seen in the Black Panther storyline "The Once and Future King", an elderly Ross is abducted by a cabal of villains assembled by T'Charra, who intends to use Ross as the bait in his plan to kill and usurp Black Panther. Ross is rescued by Black Panther, who he in turn saves when Black Panther suffers a heart attack, resuscitating the hero while screaming, "Your majesty—come back—blast you, T'Challa—we've been through too much!!"

During the "Rising Storm!" story-arc of the series X-Men Forever, a version of Ross appears on Earth-161. After Storm is outed as a murderer and an ally of a criminal organization called the Consortium, she flees to and is given sanctuary by Wakanda, to the consternation of Ross. Ross subsequently appears on behalf of the President of the United States at both the United Nations (where he warns the other representatives about the threat posed by Storm's takeover of Wakanda) and a meeting with the heads of Genosha and S.H.I.E.L.D.

== In other media ==
=== Television ===
Everett Ross appears in Black Panther (2011), voiced by David Busch.

=== Marvel Cinematic Universe ===
Martin Freeman as Everett K. Ross in a character poster for the 2018 film Black Panther.

Martin Freeman portrays Everett Ross in media set in the Marvel Cinematic Universe (MCU). This version was a member of the United States Air Force before joining the CIA and is the ex-husband of the latter's director Valentina Allegra de Fontaine.

- Ross is introduced in the film Captain America: Civil War (2016), as the Deputy Task Force Commander of the Joint Counterterrorism Center who reports to Secretary of State Thaddeus Ross. During this time, Ross works with Tony Stark's faction of the Avengers and attempts to apprehend Bucky Barnes, who was framed for bombing the Vienna International Centre. Later, he supervises the incarceration of the real culprit, Helmut Zemo, after he is captured by T'Challa.
- In the film Black Panther (2018), Ross runs into T'Challa during a black market arms sale in Busan and is injured while protecting Nakia, prompting T'Challa to take Ross to Wakanda for treatment despite the country's policies against outsiders. In return, Ross briefs T'Challa and his family on the history of Erik "Killmonger" Stevens, a former American black ops operative who they later discover is T'Challa's cousin. Following T'Challa's apparent death and Killmonger taking over Wakanda, Ross joins Shuri, Ramonda, and Nakia in escaping to the Wakandan mountains to visit the Jabari tribe, where they find and heal a wounded T'Challa. With Shuri's assistance, Everett also helps prevent Vibranium weapons from being taken out of Wakanda. Later, Ross attends a United Nations summit in Austria, where T'Challa publicly pledges Wakanda's diplomatic and humanitarian assistance to the world.
- In the film Black Panther: Wakanda Forever (2022), Ross secretly collaborates with Shuri and Okoye to help them find Riri Williams and is caught in the middle of a political conflict between the U.S. and Wakanda. De Fontaine arrests him due to his alliance with the latter, but Okoye frees him.
- In the miniseries Secret Invasion (2023), Ross has been captured by rebel Skrulls. In the episode "Resurrection", a Skrull rebel impersonates Ross to kill CIA agent Prescod for threatening his leader Gravik's plans before they are killed by a disguised Talos. In the episode "Home", Ross is rescued by G'iah, along with James Rhodes and other humans that the rebels kidnapped.

=== Video games ===
Everett K. Ross appears in Lego Marvel Super Heroes 2, as part of the "Black Panther" DLC.
