= Pyaar Ki Luka Chuppi =

Indian drama television series

- Genre: Drama; Romance
- Created by: Rashmi Sharma
- Written by: Shirish Latkar; Sharad Tripathi
- Screenplay by: Amit Jha
- Directed by: Pushkar Pandit
- Starring: Rahul Sharma; Aparna Dixit
- Opening theme: Pyar Ki Luka Chupi
- Country of origin: India
- Original language: Hindi
- No. of seasons: 1
- No. of episodes: 154

Production
- Producer: Rashmi Sharma
- Editor: Hemant Kumar Varun Singh
- Camera setup: Multi-camera
- Running time: 22 minutes
- Production company: Rashmi Sharma Telefilms

Original release
- Network: Dangal TV
- Release: 10 December 2019 – 6 September 2020

Pyaar Ki Luka Chuppi (transl. Hide and Seek of Love) is an Indian drama television series. Produced by Rashmi Sharma under Rashmi Sharma Telefilms, premiered on 10 December 2019 on Dangal. It stars Rahul Sharma and Aparna Dixit.

== Plot ==
Srishti and Sarthak are childhood friends. They grew up playing hide and seek and later fell in love with each other. Neither they nor their family members knew it. When their families became aware, they disapproved and became their dear enemies. So they tried to gain their families' approval. Srishti's family members are from a rich family and Sarthak's family is from a middle-class family.

== Cast ==
- Rahul Sharma as Sarthak Yadav
- Aparna Dixit as Srishti Yadav
- Shahab Khan as Sarthak's father
- Malika Ghai as Shartak's mother
- Shweta Gautam as Srishti's mother
- Chetanya Adib as Srishti's father
- Jasmine Avasia as Myra
- Sheetal Maulik as Kalyani
- Alan Kapoor as Angad
- Devanshi Vyas/Preet Kaur Madan as Naveli

== Production ==
The production and airing of the show was halted indefinitely in late March 2020 due to the COVID-19 outbreak in India. The series was last broadcast on the last week of March 2020 airing its remaining episodes. After three months, the filming of the series resumed with precautions on 23 June 2020 while the broadcast resumed on 2 July 2020.

The series was announced on Dangal TV by Rashmi Sharma Telefilms. Rahul Sharma and Aparna Dixit were signed as the leads. The first promo was released in November 2019. In June 2020 Alan Kapoor Cast to Play the role of Angad. The show released on 10 December 2019. It went off air on 6 September 2020.
