= Ravi Deep =

- Born: Ravi Parkash; 30 December 1954 (age 71); Firozpur, Punjab, India
- Occupations: Director, writer, actor
- Spouse: Sunita Gupta

Ravi Deep & Navnindra Behl in play The Chairs

Ravi Deep & Kanwalpreet in play Sakharam Binder

Ravi Deep (born Ravi Parkash; 30 December 1954) is an Indian theatre and television director, writer, and actor

== Biography ==
Ravi Deep started stage acting in his school days and got involved in modern theatre during college days at Kapurthala, a town in India. He along with Lalit Behl, Pramod Moutho, Satish Sharma and Harjit Walia made this small town a hub of modern theatre. He did his Masters in Dramatic Art from Punjabi University, Patiala in 1977. He did freelancing as theatre actor, director and writer. He wrote and directed short plays 'Rang Nagari' (The City of Colors), 'Kheench Rahe Hain' (Pulling On), 'Kaun Nachaye Nach?' (Who Makes Us Dance?), 'Satya Katha' (The True Story) and 'Mukti Bahini' (The Liberation Force). These plays won inter varsity contests for 4 consecutive years (1978–81). 'Rangmanch Ke Teen Rang' an anthology of his first three plays was published in March 1982. His plays are still being staged every year, mainly at University Contests. He also wrote & directed few children plays like 'Bagula Bhagat' and 'Bahurupiya'. His anthology of stories 'Bilav' was published in 2014.

Ravi Deep joined Doordarshan, the Public Service Broadcasting Organisation of India in April 1983 and shifted to programme production, writing and direction for television. He produced and directed TV Serials 'Buniad', 'Lafafi' and 'Parchhaven' besides a number of teleplays, telefilms, documentaries, and TV programmes. He won Doordarshan Award in 2008 in the Literary Adoption Category. He has four more nominations to his credit. He did Masters in Political Science (1980) and M Phil (1992). He has been the Programme Director of ABU Robocon India from 2007 to 2014.

== Filmography ==
=== As creative head ===
- Dhoop Chhaon, Hindi TV Serial, 2020–21

=== As director ===
- Taalluq, Punjabi Telefilm, 2019
- Gunaah, Punjabi Telefilm, 2018
- Men & Machines: Par Excellence, English Documentary, 2018
- Cinema Shambhari, Series on Marathi Cinema, 2013–14
- Bioscope, Feature Films based TV Show 2009–16
- Godavari Ne Kay Kele, Marathi Telefilm 2008
- Janakinama, Hindi Telefilm, 2007
- Qatalgaah, Hindi Telefilm, 2007
- Samander Ki Rani, Hindi Telefilm, 2007
- Kurukshetre Dharmkshetre, Hindi Telefilm, 2007
- Charting the Ocean, English Documentary, 2004
- Sarnawan, Punjabi TV Serial, 2000
- Sazaa, Punjabi Teleplay, 1998
- Hadasa, Punjabi Teleplay, 1998
- Balle Balle Shava Shava, New Year Eve Special TV Show, 1996 (Co-direction)
- Parchhaven, Punjabi TV Serial, 1996
- Mela Melian Da, TV Show
- Inkaar, Punjabi Teleplay
- Masiha, Punjabi Teleplay
- Matlab, Punjabi Teleplay
- Gas Regulator, Hindi Teleplay
- Chandigarh – Swapna Ek Sakaar, Documentary
- Lafafi, Punjabi TV Serial, 1993–94
- Ladayi, Teleplay, 1993
- Bebasi, Teleplay, 1993
- Necklace, Teleplay, 1993
- Dastak, New Year Eve Special TV Show, 1991
- Kujh Khatta Kujh Mittha, New Year Eve Special TV Show, 1990
- Chuniya, Hindi Telefilm, 1980
- The Battle of Hussainiwala, Documentary
- Subh Karman Te Kabahun Na Taron, Documentary
- Jain Art & Architecture: Punjab & Himachal Pradesh, Documentary
- Rashtriya Dhwaj, Feature on National Flag of India
- Ghumman Da Naat Lok, Feature on Theatre Personality Kapur Singh Ghuman
- Kullu Dasehra, Feature
- Dardmandan Dian Ahin, Feature
- Sarankshan Upbhokta Ka, Feature
- Aaghosh, Hindi Telefilm, 1987
- Munasib, Hindi & Punjabi Telefilm, 1987
- Taleem, Hindi Telefilm, 1986
- Rubaroo, Hindi Telefilm, 1986
- Bandish, Teleplay
- Shaheed, Punjabi Teleplay
- Sangharash, Hindi Telefilm, 1985
- Sailab, Hindi Telefilm, 1985
- Thes, Hindi Telefilm, 1985
- Jhotta, Punjabi Teleplay
- Ruliya, Punjabi Telefilm, 1985
- Buniyad Punjabi Serial, 1984
- Wapasi, Hindi Teleplay, 1983
- Kumarswami, Hindi Stage Play, 1982
- Nayak Katha, Hindi Stage Play, 1981
- Bakri, Hindi Stage Play
- Satyakatha, Hindi Stage Play, 1980
- Bahurupiya, Hindi Children Stage Play, 1979
- Muktivahini, Hindi Stage Play, 1979
- Kaun Nachaye Nach, Hindi Stage Play, 1979
- Kheench Rahe Hain, Hindi Stage Play, 1978
- Andhernagari Chaupat Raja, Hindi Stage Play, 1978
- Shuturmurg, Hindi Stage Play, 1978
- Rangnagari, Hindi Stage Play, 1977
- Chal Maar Udaari Udd Chaliye, Punjabi Stage Play, 1977 (Co-direction)
- Kya Number Badlega, Hindi Stage Play, 1977
- The Chairs, Hindi Stage Play, 1977
- Muktdhara, Hindi Stage Play, 1976

=== As writer ===
- Siddhi, Punjabi Telefilm, 2022 (Story, Screenplay & Dialogues)
- Udeek, Punjabi Telefilm, 2021 (Story, Screenplay & Dialogues)
- Dhoop Chhaon, Hindi TV Serial, 2020-21 (Screenplay & Dialogues)
- Taalluq, Punjabi Telefilm, 2019 (Story, Screenplay & Dialogues)
- Gunaah, Punjabi Telefilm, 2018 (Story, Screenplay & Dialogues)
- Bisaat, Hindi Short film, 2018 (Story, Screenplay & Dialogues)
- New Year Eve Special Programme of DD National Channel, 2014–15
- Janakinama, Hindi Telefilm, 2007 (Screenplay)
- Qatalgaah, Hindi Telefilm, 2007 (Screenplay)
- Kurukshetre Dharmkshetre, Hindi Telefilm, 2007 (Screenplay)
- Zakham, 2 episodes of Punjabi TV Serial Sarnawaan, 2000 (Screenplay & Dialogues)
- Hadasa, Punjabi Teleplay, 1998 (Screenplay)
- Parchhaaven, Punjabi TV Serial, 1996 (Screenplay)
- Masiha, Punjabi Telefilm, 1995 (Story, Screenplay & Dialogues)
- Lafafi, Punjabi TV Serial, 1993–94 (Screenplay)
- Chuniya, Hindi Telefilm, 1990 (Screenplay & Dialogues)
- Aaghosh, Hindi Telefilm, 1987 (Story & Screenplay)
- Taleem, Hindi Telefilm, 1986 (Story, Screenplay & Dialogues)
- Rubaroo, Hindi Telefilm based on O Henry's story 'A Retrieved Reformation', 1986 (Screenplay & Dialogues)
- Sangharash, Hindi Telefilm, 1985 (Story, Screenplay & Dialogues))
- Sailab, Hindi Telefilm, 1985 (Story, Screenplay & Dialogues))
- Thes, Hindi Telefilm, 1985 based on Faneeshwar Nath Renu's story (Screenplay & Dialogues))
- Ruliya, Punjabi Telefilm, 1985 (Story, Screenplay & Dialogues))
- Buniyad, Punjabi TV Serial, 1984 (Story & Screenplay)
- Satyakatha, Play, 1980
- Bahurupiya, Hindi Children Stage Play, 1979
- Muktivahini, Stage Play, 1979
- Kaun Nachaye Nach, Play, 1979
- Kheench Rahe Hain, Play, 1978
- Rangnagari, Stage Play, 1977

=== As actor ===
- Dhoop Chhaon, Hindi TV Serial, 2020–21
- Taalluq, Punjabi Telefilm, 2019
- Gunaah, Punjabi Telefilm, 2018
- Kurukshetre Dharmkshetre, Hindi Telefilm, 2007
- Main Ki Karan, Punjabi Teleplay, 1986
- Suryast, Hindi Stage Play, 1981
- Shuturmurg, Hindi Stage Play, 1978
- Chal Maar Udaari Udd Chaliye, Punjabi Stage Play, 1978
- Bakri, Hindi Stage Play, 1977
- The Chairs, Hindi Stage Play, 1977
- Suryast, Hindi Stage Play, 1977
- Anarkali, Urdu Stage Play, 1977
- Main Vi Haan Natak Di Pattar, Punjabi Stage Play, 1977
- Natthe Di Massi, Punjabi Stage Play, 1976
- Surya Ki Antim Kiran Se Surya Ki Pehli Kiran Tak, Hindi Stage Play, 1976
- Sakharam Binder, Stage Play, 1976
- Kya Number Badlega, Hindi Stage Play, 1974
- Hewers of Coal, Hindi Stage Play, 1973

=== As production designer ===
- Viji Amma, Documentary (credited as Ravi Mahajan)
- Sadaa-E-Vaadi, Hindi TV Serial, 2010
- Peele Patteyan Di Dastaan, Punjabi TV Serial
- Viji, TV Serial
- Khanabadosh, Urdu TV Serial, 2007
- Khabbal, Punjabi Telefilm (credited as Ravi Mahajan)
- Sunehri Jild, Punjabi Telefilm (credited as Ravi Mahajan)
- Pankhudian, Punjabi TV Serial
- Roop Basant, Punjabi TV Serial
- Ved Vyas Ke Pote, Hindi TV Serial (credited as Ravi Mahajan)
- Mahasangram, Hindi TV Serial, 2000
- Kehar, Punjabi Telefilm, 1999
- Afsane, Hindi TV Serial
- Aatish, Hindi Telefilm
- Rani Kokilan, Punjabi Telefilm
- Chirion Ka Chamba, Hindi Telefilm
- Tapish, Hindi Telefilm

=== As voice over artist ===
- Boonga Te Gosha, Moppets TV Show
- Ting Tong Teen, Puppets TV Show

== Research Work ==
Politics & Theatre in Punjab (Thesis for M Phil)

== Awards and nominations ==
Award	Result	Category	Programme
PTC Digital Film Award 2022	Won	Best Script	Udeek
PTC Digital Film Award 2022	Nomination	Best Story	Udeek
PTC Digital Film Award 2022	Nomination	Best Screenplay	Udeek
Sahyadri Award 2010	Won	Best in-house Fiction	Godaveri Ne Kay Kele
Sahyadri Award 2010	Won	Best Nonfiction (Utility)	ABU Robocon 2010: Team India
DD Award 2009–10	Nomination	Telefilm	Godaveri Ne Kay Kele
DD Award 2008–09	Won	Literary adoption	Samander Ki Rani
DD Award 2008–09	Nomination	Telefilm	Qatalgah
DD Award 2004	Nomination	Science & Technology	Charting the Ocean
