= Aye Mere Humsafar =

Indian drama television series

- Genre: Drama
- Created by: Sumeet Hukamchand Mittal; Shashi Mittal
- Screenplay by: Garima Goyal
- Directed by: Dharmendra Sharma
- Creative directors: Yashvardhan Shukla; Rohit K Mukherjee
- Starring: Tina Philip; Namish Taneja
- Opening theme: Aye Mere Humsafar
- Country of origin: India
- Original language: Hindi
- No. of seasons: 1
- No. of episodes: 159

Production
- Producers: Shashi Mittal; Sumeet Hukamchand Mittal; Jitendra Singla
- Editors: Jaskaran Singh; Omkaar Singh
- Camera setup: Multi-camera
- Running time: 22–24 minutes
- Production company: Shashi Sumeet Productions

Original release
- Network: Dangal TV
- Release: 31 August 2020 – 6 March 2021

Aye Mere Humsafar is an Indian television drama series on Dangal TV produced under Shashi Sumeet Productions. The series starred Tina Philip and Namish Taneja. It premiered on 31 August 2020 to 6 March 2021.

== Plot ==
Payal and Vidhi are two sisters living with their mother, Surajmukhi. Payal wants to become an actor while Vidhi, who has a disabled leg, wants to become an IAS officer. Ved, the son of Pratibha Devi, falls in love with Payal because of her outer beauty. But Pratibha Devi chooses Vidhi for his son's bride because of her inner beauty and simplicity. As confusion occurs, Ved thinks that his marriage is arranged with Payal, but actually it is with Vidhi. Divya, who knows all of this, does not tell anyone and plans that after the planned marriage falls apart, she will let her sister marry Ved. Imarti wants her sister to take that place.

After discovering the truth, Ved tells his mother which Vidhi then learns about. She tells her mother she refuses to marry Ved, neither telling the truth. But Divya tells her family. Surajmukhi is left heartbroken. But then Pratibha agrees that Ved and Payal will marry but still likes Vidhi. Surajmukhi also agrees to this. So marriage rituals begin. But Imarti hires a person to set up fake rehearsals for Payal to act in and Payal is happy. But she misses all the marriage rituals.

Instead of breaking up the marriage between Ved and Payal, Vidhi helps them, without knowing about the acting. But at the Haldi ceremony, Payal gives up her wish to become an actor and accepts that she will marry Ved. But on the day of the marriage, Payal leaves the Mandap and runs away to become an actor, leaving a note in the Mandap. Imarti humiliates Surajmukhi and Vidhi. They both leave the Kothari mansion. Then Imarti fills the ears of Pratibha and acted like that she is tensed for Ved. But then Surajmukhi locks herself up in a room and wants to burn herself. But Pratibha Devi promises her that she will marry Ved to Vidhi. Then, Ved and Vidhi had to marry each other for their family's respect in the society.

Ved still loves Payal and didn't want to make any married relationship with Vidhi. Meanwhile, a big revelation came out that Pratibha Devi planned all this to take her revenge from Vidhi as she thought that she had lost her one son just because of Vidhi's mistake. Pratibha repeatedly plotted revenge. She kidnapped Payal and she blamed Vidhi and her mother for plotting with a man for doing all this by sending that man on their honeymoon destination. Imarti, Divya and Bharti took advantage of this and make Vidhi to leave the house.

Vidhi returns on navratri week with the motive of proving her and her mother innocent and she succeeds. Later, Bharti was kidnapped by some goons and Vidhi saved her which created a soft corner for Vidhi in Bharti's Heart.

Pratibha planned a big conspiracy against Vidhi on the occasion of Karwa Chauth. She told Vidhi about Ved's Kundli and requested her for doing pooja for Ved. Meanwhile, she tried to kill Vidhi. Vidhi sincerely did all that and Ved saved her from the master plan of Pratibha Devi.

After the Karwa Chauth, Payal returns Vidhi's house and she still loves Ved. Pratibha Devi took advantage of this and brainwashed Payal against Vidhi. After a lot of tactics used by Payal to win the heart of Ved, she failed each time as Ved now only loves Vidhi. When Vidhi realises it's all done by her mother-in-law, Pratibha Devi, she asked her about the same. Pratibha recalled all the story to Vidhi and Vidhi decided to leave the house to make her mother-in-law happy. She left the house but Payal kidnapped her and pushed her from the valley into the river.

=== 1 month later ===
Ved went into a deep depression after Vidhi passed, hasn't smiled or spoken in one month. Pratibha Devi brings Komalkali, a look-alike of Vidhi, in the house so that Ved's health could improve. Meanwhile, Komalkali taught a lesson to Divya and Imarti by flopping all their tactics. Komalkali step father return Raghu and try to kidnap Komalkali. Slowly, Komalkali developed feelings for Ved irks Prathibha give money to Raghu

== Cast ==
=== Main ===
- Namish Taneja as Ved Kothari– Pratibha's son, Vidhi's husband, Sundar, Bharti and Lakhan's brother; Divya and Imarti's brother-in-law; Payal's love interest (2020–2021)
- Tina Philip as Vidhi Kothari– Surajmukhi's daughter, Payal's sister, Ved's wife (2020)
  - Komalkali– Vidhi's look-alike, bar dancer, Ved's helper (2020–2021)
- Ayaz Ahmed as Dr. Sahil– Vidhi's doctor and Pratibha's enemy (2021)

=== Recurring ===
- Neelu Vaghela as Pratibha Kothari– Sundar, Lakhan, Bharti and Ved's mother; Divya, Vidhi, Manoj and Imarti's mother-in-law (2020–2021)
- Rishina Kandhari as Imarti Kothari– Sundar's wife; Pratibha's daughter-in-law (2020–2021)
- Pooja Singh as Divya Kothari– Lakhan's wife; Pratibha's daughter-in-law(2020–2021)
- Vaishnavi Mahant as Surajmukhi Sharma– Vidhi and Payal's mother; Ved's mother-in-law (2020–2021)
- Urfi Javed / Heena Parmar as Payal Sharma– Surajmukhi's daughter, Vidhi's sister (2020)/(2021)
- Parvati Sehgal as Bharati Mishra– Pratibha's daughter; Sundar, Lakhan and Ved's sister (2020– 2021)
- Hemant Thatte as Sundar Kothari– Pratibha's elder son, Imarti's husband, Lakhan, Ved and Bharti's brother (2020–2021)
- Achherr Bhaardwaj as Lakhan Kothari– Pratibha's son, Divya's husband; Ved, Bharti and Sundar's brother (2020–2021)
- Sailesh Gulabani as Manoj Mishra– Bharti's husband; Pratibha's son-in-law (2020–2021)
- Juhi Aslam as Choti Bua– Pratibha's sister-in-law (2020)

=== Guest stars ===
- Shraddha Arya
- Dulquer Salmaan

== Production ==
=== Development ===
The pre-production process of the show took place during the lockdown due to the COVID-19 pandemic, they discussed the character and narrations over Zoom calls. They also had dialogue-reading sessions.

Initially titled Jeevan Saathi, the title Aye Mere Humsafar was finalized while in pre-production itself.

Lead Namish Taneja got offers for both Bigg Boss and this series at the same time, and he chose the latter.

In mid-September 2020, Taneja burnt his hand while shooting for a sequence in the kitchen, despite this, they continued to shoot.

=== Release ===
The first promo of the series was released on 23 August 2020 featuring the leads on the occasion of Ganesh Chaturthi.
