= Basera (2000 TV series) =

- Created by: Meteor Films
- Written by: Achala Nagar
- Directed by: Chander Bahl
- Starring: Alok Nath, Ranjeet, Arun Govil
- Opening theme: "Basera" by ??
- Country of origin: India
- No. of seasons: 1
- No. of episodes: Total 113

Production
- Producer: Dinesh Bansal
- Editor: Saurav Verma
- Running time: approx. 22 minutes

Original release
- Network: Zee TV
- Release: 2000 – 2001

Basera (lit. Dwelling) is a Hindi language soap opera that premiered on the Zee TV channel. The story portrays and illustrates the differences in living with a joint family compared to living in a nuclear family setup. The series was very popular among Indian audiences, especially women, and won one of the best ten serials on Indian television awards consecutively for two years. The series was ranked in the top 14 Indian television shows of the 2000s and received a TVR rating of 5.04.

== Cast ==
- Alok Nath
- Arun Govil
- Anant Mahadevan
- Ranjeet
- Satyendra Kapoor
- Kanchan
- Papiya Sengupta
- Chand Dhar
- Madhuri Dikshit
- Rohit Kumar
- Virendra Singh
- Shashi Sharma
- Hemant Choudhary
- Sukanya Kulkarni
- Vaidehi Amrute
- Anita Hassanandani
- Shweta Gautam
- Pankaj Berry
- Raymon Singh
