= Kalash – Ek Vishwaas =

Indian television series

- Genre: Soap opera
- Developed by: Ekta Kapoor
- Written by: Anil Nagpal
- Directed by: Mujammil Desai
- Starring: Aparna Dixit; Krip Suri
- Opening theme: Jai Mata Di
- Country of origin: India
- Original language: Hindi
- No. of seasons: 1
- No. of episodes: 518

Production
- Producers: Ekta Kapoor; Shobha Kapoor
- Camera setup: Multi-camera
- Running time: 22 minutes
- Production company: Balaji Telefilms

Original release
- Network: Life OK
- Release: 23 March 2015 – 17 March 2017

Kalash – Ek Vishwaas is an Indian soap opera that premiered on 23 March 2015 on Life OK. The show was produced by Ekta Kapoor and Shobha Kapoor under their banner Balaji Telefilms. The show stars Aparna Dixit and Krip Suri. The show is named after Ekta Kapoor's soap opera Kalash that aired on Star Plus from 2001 to 2003. The show ended on 17 March 2017.

Reruns of the show also aired on Star Utsav under the title Devika...Ambe Maa Ki Ladli. This show is being re-telecasted on Shemaroo TV from 8 April 2021.

== Plotline ==
Devika, a devout follower of Ambe Maa, struggles against her oppressive family. Despite her grandmother Savitri's constant discouragement of Devika's ambitions, she remains determined to pursue education and a career. Her life intersects with Ravi, an ambitious man who deals with his own family's financial struggles. Meanwhile, Savitri pressures Devika to marry Saket, a wealthy politician, to secure a political alliance. Devika faces a difficult dilemma between following her dreams and the expectations of her family.

She eventually begins her job at Rakesh Luthra’s company but faces challenges, particularly from Ravi, who becomes her competitor. Meanwhile, Saket pressures her to marry and Ravi is romantically pursued by his boss, Nivedita Luthra. In the midst of Devika's wedding preparations, Ravi uncovers Saket’s affair with Ananya, who is pregnant with his child. But Saket kills her to bury the secret, forcing Ravi to swap places with him on the wedding altar to marry Devika and save her from a miserable life.

Despite objections from her family, Devika decides to stay with Ravi. Tension builds as Devika’s in-laws, especially her mother-in-law, Manju, begin eyeing her property, seeing it as a solution to their financial struggles. Misunderstanding a conversation, Devika accuses Ravi of marrying her for her wealth, which strains their relationship. During their honeymoon, Saket manipulates the situation to drive a wedge between them, even going as far as framing Ravi in a fraud case, leading to his temporary arrest. Meanwhile, Devika and Ravi mend their relationship amidst further schemes from a vengeful Saket and a lovesick Nivedita which are not nearly over.

The tension peaks when Saket, Manju, and Nivedita plot against Devika, pushing her off a cliff. Ravi desperately searches for her, unsure of whether she’s alive. Devika, presumed dead, is saved by Janki Raichand, a powerful and influential woman. Believing Ravi betrayed her, Devika, under the guise of Ambika Raichand, vows revenge. Ravi clings to memories of Devika, hoping for her return. Meanwhile, Nivedita burns the Garewal house to erase Devika from Ravi’s life, hoping he will forget her.

Nine months later, Devika (now Ambika) reappears, confronting Ravi and Nivedita at their engagement. Ravi is emotionally confused, and Nivedita is temporarily arrested for her past actions. Ambika seeks revenge while hiding her feelings for Ravi. After a series of confrontations, Saket kidnaps her, but Ravi rescues her, and Saket is arrested. Ambika then secretly replaces Nivedita at Ravi’s wedding, revealing her true identity. Despite Ravi claiming innocence, Ambika initially distrusts him, believing he was involved in her death. After a dangerous fall, they reconcile, and Ambika accepts Ravi's love.

Two months later, Ravi wins "Architect of the Year," crediting Devika. At a celebration, Devika discovers she's pregnant but waits to share the news. Nivedita returns, apologizing, but doubts remain. After a confrontation, Monty is shot, and Ravi is arrested. Devika uncovers evidence proving someone else shot Monty, leading her to expose Nivedita and Saket as the real killers. They are arrested, and Ravi is cleared. Devika reveals she's pregnant, and they embrace, ready for their new chapter together.

== Cast ==
=== Main ===
- Aparna Dixit as Devika Deol Garewal/Ambika Raichand (Fake identity) : Ravi's wife; Atal Deol's daughter; Sakshi, Pallavi, Ajay, Abhay and Sanjay's cousin; Saket's former fiancée (2015–2017)
- Krip Suri as Ravi Garewal: Devika's husband; Manju's son; Vikas and Addy's brother; Monty's cousin; Nivedita's former fiancé (2015–2017)

=== Recurring ===
- Mahesh Shetty as Saket Kapoor: Shweta's brother; Devika's former fiancé (2015-2017)
- Parakh Madan/Seema Mishra as Nivedita Luthra: Rakesh's daughter; Amit's sister; Ravi's former fiancée (2015-2016)/(2016–2017)
- Alka Amin as Manju Garewal: Ravi, Vikas and Addy's mother (2015–2017)
- Neena Cheema as Savitri Devi Deol: Manohar's wife; Atal and Shekhar's mother; Abhay, Devika, Sakshi, Pallavi, Ajay and Sanjay's grandmother (2015–2016)
- Shritama Mukherjee/Donal Bisht as Sakshi Deol Garewal: Rekha and Shekhar's daughter; Devika, Pallavi, Ajay, Abhay and Sanjay's cousin; Monty's widow (2015)/(2015–2017)
- Aditya Bakshi as Manveer "Monty" Garewal: Kulwinder's son; Ravi, Vikas and Addy's cousin; Sakshi's husband (2015–2017)
- Akanksha Jindal/Priyanka Purohit/Sabina Jat as Pallavi Deol: Rekha and Shekhar's daughter; Devika, Sakshi, Ajay, Abhay and Sanjay's cousin (2015)/(2015–2017)/(2017)
- Virendra Singh as Atal Deol: Devika's Father (2015)
- Sangeeta Kapure as Rekha Deol: Shekhar's wife; Devika's Chachi; Sakshi & Pallavi's mother (2015–2017)
- Aashu Kohli as Shekhar Deol: Savitri and Manohar's son; Atal's brother; Devika's Chacha; Sakshi & Pallavi's father (2015–2016)
- Anil Rastogi as Manohar Deol: Savitri's husband; Atal and Shekhar's father; Abhay, Devika, Sakshi, Pallavi, Ajay and Sanjay's grandfather (2015)
- Mamta Luthra as Gayatri Kapoor: Saket and Shweta's mother (2015–2016)
- Manni Boparai as Shweta Kapoor Garewal: Saket's sister; Vikas's wife (2015–2017)
- Madhur Arora as Vikas Garewal: Manju's son; Ravi and Addy's brother; Monty's cousin; Shweta's husband (2015–2017)
- Dolly Sohi as Janki Devi Raichand (2016–2017)
- Parag Tyagi as Abhay Deol: Devika, Sakshi, Ajay, Sanjay and Pallavi's cousin; Shalu's Husband (2015)
- Nikhil Shaney as Ajay Deol: Devika's cousin, Tanushree's husband (2015)
- Aanchal Yadav as Tanushree Deol: Ajay's wife, Devika's sister-in-law and Friend (2015)
- Sumeet Samnani as Sanjay Deol: Devika, Sakshi, Pallavi, Ajay and Abhay's cousin (2015)
- Mukul Harish as Amit Luthra: Rakesh's son; Nivedita's brother; Devika & Ravi's Boss (2015)
- Deepak Qazir Kejriwal as Rakesh Luthra: Nivedita and Amit's father (2015)
- Vijayeta Bhardwaj (Donny Kapoor) as Kulwinder Garewal: Monty's mother (2015–2017)
- Swati Bajpai as Namrata: Abhay's ex girlfriend (2015)
- Pooja Bisht as Sheily: Ravi's college friend's fiancée (2015)
- Rishika Mihani as Ananya: Pregnant with Saket's child (2015)
- Karishma Sawant as Receptionist (in Kasauli episodes) (2015)
- Gaurav Nanda as Mayank Mittal (2015)
- Kohposh Sapru as Aadesh "Addy" Garewal: Manju's son; Ravi and Vikas's brother; Monty's cousin (2015)
- Amit Dolawat as Dildaar (2016)
- Lankesh Bhardwaj as Police Inspector
- Vishal Karwal as Rajdeep (2016)
