= Dangal (TV channel) =

Indian Hindi language television channel

- Country: India
- Broadcast area: International
- Headquarters: Mumbai, Indore

Programming
- Language: Hindi

Ownership
- Owner: Enterr10 Television Network Pvt Ltd
- Sister channels: Dangal 2 Dangal Odia; Bhojpuri Cinema; Enterr10 Bangla; Fakt Marathi

History
- Launched: 2009; 17 years ago

Links
- Website: DangalTV on Dangal Play

Dangal TV is an Indian general entertainment television channel owned by Enterr10 Television Network. It was launched in 2009 as a Bhojpuri-language movie channel but was later converted into a Hindi entertainment channel. Its programming consists of scripted television shows.

== History ==
Dangal TV was launched as a Bhojpuri movie channel in 2009 for India. In 2015, it was converted into a Hindi general entertainment channel by acquiring and aired most of the Hindi television shows from the former defunct entertainment channel Imagine TV and along with television channels like DD National, Star Plus, Sony Entertainment Television, Zee TV, Colors TV and Sahara One.

In 2017, Dangal TV made an entry into original content called Crime Alert (the first one-hour television show based on real-life crimes in India), Bahurani (the first original reality show) and Shivarjun: Ek Ichhadhari Ki Dastaan (the first original soap opera). After making an entry to original space, Dangal TV became the most watched Hindi-language entertainment channel by beating paid television channels.

In 2021, Dangal TV made a deal with Viacom 18 by streaming their entire shows to their OTT app Voot. In the same year, they stopped airing acquired shows until October and started airing only original content shows. It was converted into an original entertainment channel, as their acquired shows were moved to the newly launched entertainment channel Dangal 2.

== Reception ==
Dangal TV gained a response from Hindi speaking viewers by acquiring television shows from Hindi television channels, along with original shows like Mann Sundar, Mann Atisundar, Nath – Zewar Ya Zanjeer, Gehna – Zewar Ya Zanjeer, Crime Alert, Aye Mere Humsafar, Pyaar Ki Luka Chuppi, Ranju Ki Betiyaan, and Prem Bandhan.

== Programming ==
=== Current broadcasts ===
Premiere date	Show	Ref.
18 October 2021	Mann Sundar	
24 July 2023	Mann Atisundar	
19 May 2025	Pati Brahmachari	
13 October 2025	Rimjhim	
26 January 2026	Ishq Junooni	
6 July 2026	Kaisi Teri Dillagi	
31 August 2026	Hamari Bhabhi No. 1	
5 October 2026	Sohni – Aur Nahi Koi Honi	

=== Original programming ===
==== Anthology series ====
Year	Show	Ref.
2019	Achanak Uss Roz	
2019	Darr Ki Dastak	
2019	Yeh Ishq Nahin Aasaan	

==== Children/teen series ====
Year	Show	Ref.
2021	Nikki Aur Jadui Bubble	

==== Comedy series ====
Year	Show	Ref.
2022–2023	Favvara Chowk	

==== Drama series ====
Year	Show	Ref.
2020	Alif Laila	
2020–2021	Aye Mere Humsafar	
2025	Aye Dil Jee Le Zara	
2023–2024	Aaina – Roop Nahin, Haqeeqat Bhi Dikhaye	
2024	Anokhaa Bandhan	
2023	Baazi Ishq Ki	
2025–2026	Bade Ghar Ki Chhoti Bahu	
2022–2023	Bindiya Sarkar	
2019–2020	CIF	
2022	Control Room	
2017–2023	Crime Alert	
2023–2024	Dalchini	
2024	Deewani	
2025	Dilwali Dulha Le Jayegi	
2020	Ek Anokhi Rakshak – Naagkanya	
2024–2025	Gehna – Zewar Ya Zanjeer	
2024–2025	Gudiya Rani	
2023–2024	Har Bahu Ki Yahi Kahani Sasumaa Ne Meri Kadar Na Jaani	
2022–2023	Ishq Ki Dastaan – Naagmani	
2022–2023	Janam Janam Ka Saath	
2023	Jyoti... Umeedon Se Sajee	
2024	Janani – AI Ki Kahani	
2025	Jhallee	
2018	Kahani Ek Raat Ki	
2023–2024	Kaisa Hai Yeh Rishta Anjaana	
2025	Kahani Pehle Pyaar Ki	
2024–2025	Lekar Hum Deewana Dil	
2023	Mast Mauli	
2024	Mil Ke Bhi Hum Na Mile	
2021–2024	Nath	
2022–2023	Palkon Ki Chhaon Mein 2	
2025	Paro Sang Dev	
2026	Pati Anaadi	
2019–2020	Phir Laut Aayi Naagin	
2023	Piya Abhimani	
2020–2021	Prem Bandhan	
2024–2025	Prem Leela	
2019–2020	Pyaar Ki Luka Chuppi	
2025	Pyaar Kii Raahein	
2023–2024	Purnimaa	
2021–2022	Rakshabandhan... Rasal Apne Bhai Ki Dhal	
2021	Ranju Ki Betiyaan	
2022	Rang Jaun Tere Rang Mein	
2025–2026	Rangbaazi Dilon Ki	
2025	Sanam Mere Humraz	
2022	Shubh Shagun	
2021–2023	Sindoor Ki Keemat	
2023	Sindoor Ki Keemat 2	
2018	Shivarjun Ek Ichchadhari Ki Dastaan	
2025	Sajan Ji Ghar Aye Family Kyun Sharmaye	
2025–2026	Shrimati Shukla	
2026	Saajan Ghar	
2026	Tees Ke Paar Jab Mila Pyaar	
2023–2024	Tose Naina Milaai Ke	
2026	Tose Naina Milaai Ke 2	
2024–2025	Tulsi – Hamari Badi Sayani	

==== Mythological series ====
Year	Show	Ref.
2022	Brij Ke Gopal	
2020–2021	Dwarkadheesh Bhagwaan Shree Krishn - Sarvkala Sampann	
2020–2021	Devi Adi Parashakti	
2022	Jai Hanuman - Sankat Mochan Naam Tiharo	
2020	Katha - Vishwas Ke Ithihaas Ki	

==== Reality/non-scripted programming ====
Year	Show	Ref.
2017	Bahurani	
2023-2024	Kitchen Ki Jung Dangal Family Ke Sang	

== Filmography ==
Year	Film	Director	Cast	Language	Notes	Ref.
2026	Tera Yaar Hoon Main	Milap Zaveri	Aman Indra Kumar, Akanksha Sharma, Paresh Rawal	Hindi	Under the Production as Enter10 Television	
2026	Demonte Colony 3	R. Ajay Gnanamuthu	Arulnithi, Priya Bhavani Shankar	Tamil	Third part of Demonte Colony	
2026	Maragadha Naanayam 2	ARK Saravan	Aadhi Pinisetty, Nikki Galrani, Priya Bhavani Shankar, Sathyaraj, Daniel Annie Pope	Tamil	Second part of Maragadha Naanayam	
