= Kaal Bhairav Rahasya =

- Created by: Ravi Garani
- Written by: Vishal Watwani; Renu Watwani; Vikas Sharma
- Directed by: Dharmesh Shah (season 1)
- Creative directors: Tanvesh Jain ( CD ) Atul Kumar Sharma (Creative Head); Sunayana Krashnanvanshi ( ACH )
- Starring: Rahul Sharma; Chhavi Pandey; Sargun Kaur Luthra; Additi Gupta; Gautam Rode
- Country of origin: India
- Original language: Hindi
- No. of seasons: 2
- No. of episodes: 272

Production
- Producers: Piyush Gupta (season 1); Jatin Sethi (Season 1); Ravindra Gautam (Season 2)
- Camera setup: Multi-camera
- Running time: 22 minutes
- Production companies: Diamond Pictures (Season 1); RG Pictures (Season 2)

Original release
- Network: Star Bharat
- Release: 30 October 2017 – 9 April 2019

Kaal Bhairav Rahasya (transl. The Mystery of Kaal Bhairav) is an Indian thriller television series. The series ran for two seasons from October 2017 to April 2019. Both seasons are based on written works of Indra Soundarrajan. The story of the first season is based on his Tamil novel A Secret (Ragasiyamaga Oru Ragasiyam), The second season story is based on the supernatural thriller tale of Soundarrajan titled The Palace of Kottaipuram (Kottai Purathu Veedu). The series features different cast in each season although many cast members appeared in both seasons as different characters.

It is also dubbed in Telugu as Kaala Bhairava Rahasyam and aired on Star Maa.

== Broadcasting ==
This story is based on the supernatural thriller by the veteran Tamil writer Indra Soundarrajan, The Palace of Kottaipuram (Kottai Purathu Veedu) which was also made into a successful daily soap under the same name in 1990 The first season titled Kaal Bhairav Rahasya aired from 30 October 2017 to 30 April 2018 on Star Bharat. and is shot in Bhopal and starred Chhavi Pandey, Rahul Sharma, Sargun Kaur Luthra and Iqbal Khan. The Second Season Starred Additi Gupta and Gautam Rode. Both the series were popular among viewers.

== Plot ==
=== Season 1 ===
The story is based on a Tamil novel Ragasiyamaga Oru Ragasiyam which was also made into a serial called Marmadesam by Indra Soundarrajan, and aired on television in the 90s.

The story begins with Indra, a reporter, who goes to Bandiipur's Kaalbhairav temple. He stays in the temple after the villagers leave. Alone at night, he hears strange sounds and the next morning he is found dead. Inspector Akshay decides to stay in the temple to investigate. That night once again sounds of drums are heard followed by a gunshot. In the morning they find Akshay has gone missing.

A young man, named Nandu arrives and tells the villagers that he has come to work as the village priest's assistant. He befriends the village chief, Dada Thakur's daughter, Namrata and the priest's daughter, Gauri.

A few days after Indra's death, his widow Preeti and daughter Minty settle down in the village to find the truth of Indra's death. Namrata's brother, Aditya likes Preeti, but she mistrusts everyone in the village. Nandu is revealed to be Indra's younger brother, Rahul, and is also investigating Indra's death secretly. Namrata and Aditya find out his identity but promise to keep his secret. Rahul and Namrata find Indra's camera footage but it leads them nowhere.

Nandu/Rahul wins the dahi haandi contest during Janmaashtami celebrations and asks Data Thakur permission to spend a night in the temple as his reward. Nandu survives but gets badly injured. Data Thakur discovers Rahul's identity and asks Indra's family to leave the village. Rahul believes that someone disguises as Kaal Bhairav and kills people in the temple. He initially suspects the village head/Sarpanch and Shakti Thakur, but they turn out to be innocent.

Gauri falls in love with Rahul, as does Namrata but Rahul is focussed on his search. Lakhanpal locks Gauri in the temple after sunset to avenge his insult. Gauri prays to Kaal Bhairav all night and is saved. She starts having dreams that turn to reality. Finally, it is revealed that the mystery behind all the murders is Namrata. When Aditya chances upon her truth, she is forced to kill her own brother.

While Rahul and Gauri are on the run from Lakhanpal, Data Thakur also discovers Namrata's secret and tries to fight her. She and her men overpower him and she reveals that she is avenging her mother's death who was killed by Data Thakur. She also wants to get the nine golden Shiva Lingas idols and wants Rahul to return her love. She also reveals that she has left a trace of evidence implicating Data Thakur for all the murders.

Meanwhile, Rahul falls in love with Gauri. Preeti and Gauri's father accept their love but Gauri decides to wait till there is peace in the village. The story focuses on the search for the nine golden shiva lingas. Still pretending to be innocent, Namrata and Gauri look for them together by following Gauri's dreams though Namrata wants to kill Gauri once the search is over. Also searching for the idols are Rahul, Dr. Srivastava and CID Officer Yash Pal.

Namrata is secretly helped by her friend Latika (Simar Kaur Suri) who has kidnapped Data Thakur and Lakhanpal to keep them quiet. Namrata succeeds in finding five of the nine shiva lingas. Gradually, Gauri becomes aware of Namrata's true intentions. She succeeds in rescuing Data Thakur and Lakhanpal and they join forces to expose Namrata. In trying to obtain another shiva linga, Namrata and Rahul meet a man who has the idol. Namrata emotionally manipulates him and he shows her how she can use magic to control Rahul. Latika tries to dissuade her but is rejected by Namrata. Namrata uses the magic on Rahul who tries to kill Gauri on Namrata's orders when she tells him about Namrata. Gauri is saved by Latika who seemingly mends her ways.

It is then revealed that Indra is still alive and living under the identity of Seth ji. He faked his death to obtain the nine idols for money. Latika is revealed to be Indra's second wife who has been working with him. She tries to kill Rahul in the temple but Namrata, who has reformed and is ready to repent, saves Rahul. She runs and pin Latika to the wall by stabbing with a trishool in her stomach. Indra gets furious seeing Latika die, pick up knife and in turn stabs Namrata in her stomach who dies in Rahul's arms.

However, the temple is surrounded by angry villagers. Indra threatens them that he has hidden bombs all across the village and will detonate them. At that moment, Rudra, the truck driver who claimed to be a messenger of God, is revealed to be none than Lord Kaal Bhairav in disguise, and comes to aid Rahul, Gauri and the other villagers. He kills Indra and restores the shiva lingas to the temple, and disappears along with Shambhu Baba, who is revealed to be his mount (vaahan).

=== Season 2 ===
This story is based on the supernatural thriller by the veteran Tamil writer Indra Soundarrajan, The Palace of Kottaipuram (Kottai Purathu Veedu), which was also made into a successful daily soap under the same name in 1990.

The story begins in the year 1868, with a woman named Lali carrying her child, trying to escape from King Vikram Singh and his guards. She seeks shelter in Kaal Bhairav's temple but is unfortunately caught by the king. He kills her son and rapes her. The villagers reach the temple but the king has already stabbed her by then. Lali curses the evil king that all his future successors will die before celebrating their 30th birthday and his lineage will come to an end.

The story then shifts to the current time. Veervardhan/Veer is a descendant of the evil king. Living happily in Bhopal, away from the cursed Kanakgarh Palace, he proposes marriage to his friend, Archie but on receiving a call from his elder brother, Yashvardhan, Veer is reminded of the curse. On Yashvardhan's 30th birthday, Veer visits the palace only to find that his brother is in hiding waiting for the curse to pass.

But in the last few moments of the curse, Yashvardhan is stabbed in the back by a trident (trishool) and eventually dies. Following his death, a police officer named Sumer Singh tries to investigate the case of Yashardhan's death. However, he goes missing and people believe he was punished by Kaal Bhairav. Fearing for his own death, Veer orders his friend Kedar to drop Archie at the airport and instructs her to leave. But on receiving a call from an unknown source, Archie is alerted when the caller warns of Nagveli peasants planning an attack on Veer.

At the site of Yashvardhan's funeral, Veer is attacked by goons but with Archie's help, he survives. Scared for his life, Veer decides to flee from Kanakgarh and asks Archie to do the same and assures her of meeting in Bhopal within two days but Maharani learns of his plan and alerts all the security personnel to stop Veer from leaving the palace.

Although Veer manages to escape by fooling the guards. Fearing Lord Kaal Bhairav's wrath the villagers decide to leave Kanakgarh. Archie too manages to escape from the palace and joins the fleeing villagers. They are stopped mid-way by Laali's drifting soul. Ill omens start to haunt the villagers due to Veer's absence with humans being converted into earthen lamps by Kaal Bhairav. Unable to flee from the village the villagers take shelter in the Kaal Bhairav temple where Rajguru on Maharani's orders asks them to trap Archie to make Veer return to the palace by using her as bait.

Archie flees from the temple. She calls Dolly and asks her to stop Veer from returning to Kanakgarh.She then calls Kedar for help who in turn gets her caught by the villagers. Veer learns from Dolly that Archie is in trouble and rushes back to Kanakgarh to help her. When Veer returns to the village he is asked to flog his family members with a whip as a punishment for violating the rules of the curse. To Archie's shock, when Veer fulfils the punishment, she witnesses the earthen lamps kept inside the shrine of the temple, being covered in a thick cloud of smoke, getting replaced by the villagers.

A swayamvar (bride-choosing ceremony) is organised for Veer with four women, including Archie. The brides are supposed to pass a tough test which could even lead to their deaths and the survivor would be chosen as Veer's wife. Veer hides the other three women in Kaal Bhairav's temple and decides to face the test with Archie. As a part of the test they are required to go to Laali's abandoned house and fetch black mud from the idol of Lord Kaal Bhairav . When they reach there they experience paranormal activities and Veer sees the headless spirits of his ancestors praying along with Laali's soul in front of the idol of Lord Kaal Bhairav. Archie follows Laali's spirit towards the forest to ask for forgiveness and lift her curse upon Veer and his family. Veer runs behind her and tries to stop her but gets attacked by Kaal Bhairav while Archie is shown to be killed by Kaal Bhairav's trident.

Veer is rescued by a woman, named Bhairavi, who claims to be Kaal Bhairav's daughter. No one believes her at first but she makes her story credible by revealing to them some dark secrets of the royal family members and also replacing the dog with Sumer Singh in a closed room with everyone believing that the police officer had returned to his original self by the grace of Kaal Bhairav. She also claims that she is the only one who can bring Archie back but the illegitimate successor of the royal family needs to be identified.

Revati gets anxious as her son, Jai does not have royal blood. Meanwhile, Kedar who is looking for Archie in the forest, sees the same dog that everyone presumed to be Officer Sumer Singh and also spots Bhairavi with a woman dressed up as Lali's drifting soul. He starts believing everything to be a scam concocted by Bhairavi and records everything on his phone as a proof. Veer gets to know that Kedar is his step brother. He rushes to the forest to save him but he Kedar has already been killed.

Archie returns and Veer, believing in the magic of Bhairavi, decides to marry her. Archie and Sumer try to expose Bhairavi but fail. But, with Tittu's help, Archie and Veer are married. Kedar's brother, Neeraj blames Veer for Kedar's death and joins Bhairavi in her evil plans. Archie discovers a secret tunnel inside the palace. Bhairavi tries to kill Veer who is saved by Archie. Archie and Sumer are abducted by Bhairavi and see her taking orders from a man wearing Kaal Bhairav's mask whom she calls "Bhagwan". Eventually, Veer sees Bhairavi's true colours, As Bhagwan instructs Bhairavi to kill Veer . A monk saves Veer and Archie but Bhairavi is injured. The monk tells Veer that Bhairavi's brother was being held by Bhagwan who was forcing her to kill Veer.

Veer rescues Bhairavi's brother. Archie discovers that, Bhagwan is in fact, Veer's mother, who on the advice of a taantrik is trying to kill him to break the curse. Archie expose her to everyone. Maharani dies and a mysterious prophesy predicts that one royal would die every week. Bhairavi is possessed by Maharani's ghost to kill Veer but she fails and dies. Lord Kaal Bhairav sends Archie a signal in a dream helping her find the bearded man who is revealed to be Rajguru in disguise and has been keeping the royal princesses hostage and killed Kedar to avenge what was done to his sister, Lali.

Veer then discovers that the king who killed Lali was not actually a royal. It is then revealed that the real mastermind is Brahmanand, the evil heir of Lali who is conspiring against the royal family by making different people pawns in his game. Through a series of events, Veer and Archie defeat him with the help of Lord Kaal Bhairav and live happily ever after.

== Cast ==
=== Main ===
- Rahul Sharma as Rahul Prakash/Nandu: Indra's younger brother; Namrata's love interest; Gauri's fiancé
- Chhavi Pandey as Namrata Vishambar Pratap Singh: Data Thakur's daughter; Rahul's one-sided lover; Aditya's sister
- Sargun Kaur Luthra as Gauri: Rahul's fiancé; Pujari Ji and Kalavati's daughter; Anand's sister

=== Recurring ===
- Puja Joshi as Preeti Indra Prakash, Inder's wife, Minty's mother, Rahul's sister-in-law.
- Iqbal Khan as Indra Prakash / Sethji: Preeti's husband; Minty's father; Rahul's elder brother; Latika's affair interest
- Raj Premi as Data Thakur/Vishambar Pratap singh, Namrata and Aditya's father, Shakti devi's cousin, Former village chief
- Sunila Karambelkar as Shakti Devi Thakur, Data thakur's cousin, Namrata and Aditya's aunt, Village chief
- Saurabh Dubey as Pandit ji, The village's priest, Anand and Gauri's father, Kalavati's husband
- Amita Nangia as Surili/Garudi, a sorcerer
- Manoj Kolhatkar as Garudi's husband, who wants to stop Garudi from doing bad work.
- Pankaj Vishnu as Lakhan Paal, Dada Thakur's bodyguard who is obsessed with Gauri
- Prithvi Zutshi as Sarpanch, Soumya's father
- Mukul Nag as Shambhu Baba, the real Lord Kaal Bhairav's vahan, Schwan
- Aamir Dalvi as Rudra, the real Lord Kaal Bhairav
- Rajesh Puri as Dr. Narendra Shrivastava, Nathu a mental patient at Shambhu Baba's Ashram
- Madhavi Gogate as Kalavati, Gauri and Anand's mother, Pandit ji's wife
- Rakesh Kukreti as Chief Minister
- Neha Mishra as Saumya, Gauri's friend, Sarpanch's daughter, Sheru's sister, Anand's love interest
- Prakash Ramchandani as CID Officer Yashpal Rathi
- Ahwaan Kumar as Aditya Pratap Singh, Data thakur's son, Namrata's brother.
- Nivin Ramani as Anand, Pandit ji and Kalavati's son, Gauri's brother, Saumya's love interest
- Arun Singh Rana as Inspector Akshay, Inder's friend
- Manan Joshi as Shamsher/Sheru, sarpanch's son and Soumya's brother
- Somesh Aggarwal as Vaid ji, Village's elder
- Shyam Mashalkar as Manoj, Inder's colleague
- Vivek Bhadauria as Shankar
- Simran Kaur Suri as Latika, Indra's second wife

=== Main ===
- Additi Gupta as Archana Singh alias Archie/Yuvrani: Laali's last descendant; Veer's wife
- Gautam Rode as Veer Vardhan Singh alias Bade Yuvraj: The king of Kanakgarh; Raj and Swamini's younger son; Rajmata's grandson; Yash's younger brother; Kedar and Neeraj's step-brother; Archana's husband

=== Recurring ===
- Aayam Mehta as Rajguru/Bramannand
- Kenisha Bhardwaj as Vandana Singh: Yash's wife, Brahmanand's relative, Akshay's former girlfriend
- Barkha Sengupta as Bhairavi: An impostor who was forced to pretend as Lord Kaal Bhairav's daughter as her brother was kidnapped by the fake 'Bhagwan'; Neeraj's partner
- Ahwaan Kumar as Akshay Sukhreja alias Rudra: Yash and Veer's bodyguard
- Sonia Singh as Revati Singh: Ram's wife; Kashinath's secret lover; Yash, Veer, Kedar and Neeraj's aunt; Jai's mother
- Raj Premi as Vishambhar Pratap Singh: The chief of a village; Abhiram's father
- Kumar Hegde as Kashinath Thakur: The chief security officer of Palace; Revati's secret lover; Jai's father
- Vineeta Malik as Chandrika Singh alias Rajmata: Raj and Ram's mother; Swamini and Revati's mother-in-law; Yash, Veer, Kedar and Neeraj's grandmother
- Alefia Kapadia as Pavitra: A villager and Yash's former lover, pregnant with his child
- Chandan Madan as Pavitra's Drunk Husband
- Pankaj Vishnu as Inspector Sumer Singh
- Shresth Kumar as Neeraj Singh/fake Abhiram Pratap Singh: Raj and Kunika's illegitimate younger son; Rajmata's grandson; Kedar's younger brother; Yash and Veer's step-brother; Bhairavi's partner
- Swati Anand as Kunika Choudhry: Raj's mistress; Kedar and Neeraj's mother; Yash and Veer's step-mother
- Satya Tiwari as Kedar Singh: Raj and Kunika's illegitimate elder son; Rajmata's grandson; Swamini's step-son; Neeraj's elder brother; Yash and Veer's step-brother
- Seema Pandey as Swamini Devi Singh alias Maharani: Raj's wife; Yash and Veer's mother; Kedar and Neeraj's step-mother; Vandana and Archana's mother-in-law
- Viraaj Kapoor as Jaywant Thakur alias Jai: Kashinath and Revati's illegitimate son
- Siddhant Karnick as Yash Vardhan Singh: Raj and Swamini's elder son; Rajmata's grandson; Veer's elder brother; Kedar and Neeraj's step-brother; Vandana's husband
  - Vansh Sayani as Young Yash Vardhan Singh
- Anjali Abrol as Lalita Yatopadhyay alias Laali: Archana's ancestor, earlier known as Kaal Bhairav's daughter and killed by Vikram
- Vandana Vithlani as Hemangi Dasgupta: Principal of a local school
- Manoj Verma as King Vikram Singh: The 19th century ruler of Kanakgarh; Laali's murderer

== Production ==
Initially shot in Indore and Ahilya Devi Maheshwar Fort in banks of Narmada River, Maheshwar, M.P, the climax of season 1 of the series was shot at Madhya Pradesh.

== Production crew ==
1. Creative Director: Tanvesh Jain 2. Creative head: Atul Kumar Sharma 3. Associate Director: Pratik Harphale 4. Director: Dharmesh Shah 5. Director: Vaibhav Singh 6. Costume Designer: Winne Malhotra<b 7. Director: Ravindra Gautam 8. Associate Director: Gyanendra Pratap Singh 9. Assistant Director: Himanshu Baluni, Aarti Bhatt, Krishna Shah, Aman Bhardwaj 10. Costume AD: Beauty Malakar 11. Post Creative: Nupur Vashisht, Abhilash Vats 12. Production Manager: Neelam Daswani, Ayush Bellore 13. Casting Director: Sonu Singh Solanki, Asad Sheikh, Ajay Kabir, Sourabh Sharma 14. Cameraman: Raj Panth, Veerdhawal Puranik, Suhas Mahadik

== See also ==
- List of Hindi thriller shows
