= Shruti Sharma (actress) =

Indian actress (born 1994)

- Occupation: Actress
- Years active: 2018–present
- Known for: Gathbandhan

Shruti Sharma is an Indian actress who primarily works in Hindi television. She started her career as a contestant on the reality show India's Next Superstars in 2018 and then made her acting debut on television in 2019 with Gathbandhan where she played IPS Dhanak Parekh. Sharma made her film debut with the Telugu film Agent Sai Srinivasa Athreya (2019) and made her Hindi film debut with Pagglait (2021). She also played the dual role of Kahani Verma and Satya Singh Verma in Namak Issk Ka. In 2024, she earned praises for her portrayal in Heeramandi (2024).

== Career ==
Sharma entered Hindi television as a participant in India's Next Superstars in 2018 and emerged as the "Third Superstar". The same year she made her web debut with the YouTube web series Blockbuster Zindagi alongside Aakarshit Gupta. She appeared in a music video, Main Hua Tera alongside Avitesh Shrivastava in 2018.

She made her acting debut in January 2019 with the television show, Gathbandhan where she played the role of IPS Dhanak Parekh, a police officer who marries a don opposite Abrar Qazi. The show went off-air in November 2019. Sharma made her film debut with the 2019 Telugu film Agent Sai Srinivasa Athreya opposite Naveen Polishetty in the role of assistant detective. It received positive reviews from the critics, and was successful at the box office.

In 2020, Sharma played the lead role of Daivik Palak Verma Chaudhary in supernatural series Nazar 2 opposite Sheezan Mohammed. It ended early due to the situation of COVID-19. She then played Shayari Choudhary alongside Shehzada Dhami in Yehh Jadu Hai Jinn Ka! the same year. In November 2020, she starred in Namak Issk Ka portraying the double role of Kahani Verma/Chamcham and Satya Verma opposite Aditya Ojha. The show went off-air in August 2021.

Sharma made her Hindi film debut with Sanya Malhotra's Pagglait in 2021. She played the role of Nazia Zaidi. It received mixed to positive reviews.

In 2024, Sharma made her web debut with Sanjay Leela Bhansali's Heeramandi, playing Saima, a maid. Shubhra Gupta of The Indian Express termed her performance "spot on". Sukanya Verma noted, "Shruti Sharma's Saima fares a lot better than Alamzeb." In the same year earlier, Sharma made her Arabic-language debut in an Emirati historical drama web-series named Al-Boom (Arabic : البوم) which is based during the Second World War period. She plays a woman named Tarannum who hails from Calicut and she makes her appearance starting from the seventh episode onward. This was her first international web-series as well. However, all her scenes and dialogues in that web-series are in English.

== Filmography ==
=== Films ===
Key
†	Denotes films that have not yet been released

Year	Title	Role	Language	Ref
2019	Agent Sai Srinivasa Athreya	Sneha Raghuvanshi	Telugu	
2021	Pagglait	Nazia Zaidi	Hindi	

=== Television ===
Year	Title	Role	Notes	Ref.
2018	India's Next Superstars	Contestant	Winner	
2019	Gathbandhan	ACP Dhanak Raghu Jadhav		
2020	Nazar	Daivik Palak Verma Chaudhary	Season 2	
2020	Yehh Jadu Hai Jinn Ka!	Shayari Choudhary		
2020–2021	Namak Issk ka	Kahani Yug Pratap Rajput / Chamcham Rani		
2021	Namak Issk ka	Satya Singh Verma		
2024	Heeramandi: The Diamond Bazaar	Saima		
2024–2025	Al-Boom	Tarannum	Arabic-language Emirati series	
2026	Office Office: Chali Mussaddi Ki Beti	Anokhi Lal Mussaddi		

=== Web series ===
Year	Title	Role	Ref.
2025	Mitti – Ek Nayi Pehchaan	Kratika	

=== Music videos ===
Year	Title	Singer(s)	Ref.
2018	Main Hua Tera	Avitesh Shrivastava	
2023	Tanha Dil	Siddharth Saxena	
2024	Kinni Soni	Darshan Raval	
2026	Teri Umeed Tera Intezaar	Yasser Desai	

== See also ==
- List of Hindi television actresses
- List of Indian television actresses
- List of Hindi film actresses
