= Shireen Mirza =

Indian television actress

- Born: Jaipur, Rajasthan, India
- Education: Maharani College
- Occupation: Actress

Shireen Mirza is an Indian actress. Shireen is well known and popular for her role as Simran "Simmi" Bhalla in Ye Hai Mohabbatein. Shireen has also worked in a Netflix web series called Dharamkshetra, Dhhai Kilo Prem, 24 and films like Main Nahin Anna, Not Today and Vartamaan.

== Biography ==
Shireen hails from Jaipur. Shireen who graduated from Maharani College, Jaipur and majored English and Dramatics. She has hosted the kids reality show Apka Sapna Hamara Apna with Ali Asgar.

Shireen married on 23 October in her hometown Jaipur.

== Television ==
- 2023-2024 Yeh Hai Chahatein as Nitya Bajwa
- 2022–2023 Pyar Ke Saat Vachan Dharampatnii as Mandeep Amardeep Randhawa
- 2022 Bohot Pyaar Karte Hai as Kamna Pankaj Malhotra
- 2013–2019 Ye Hai Mohabbatein as Simran "Simmi" Bhalla
- 2017 Dhhai Kilo Prem as Rashmi
- Dharamkshetra on Netflix
- 24
- 2013 Yeh Hai Aashiqui
- 2011 Anhoniyon Ka Andhera
- Gutur Gu
- Apka Sapna Humara Apna as a Host
- 2013 Savdhaan India
- Box Cricket League as Herself
- 2015–2016 Yeh Kahan Aa Gaye Hum as Dr. Shireen
- Not Today Hollywood Venture as a Main Negative Lead
- 2010 MTV Girl's Night Out as Herself (contestant)

== Filmography ==
- Main Nahin Anna
- Not Today and
- Vartamaan
- Love Training
- Yeh Hai Chahatein
