= Aditi Sharma (actress, born 1983) =

Indian television actress

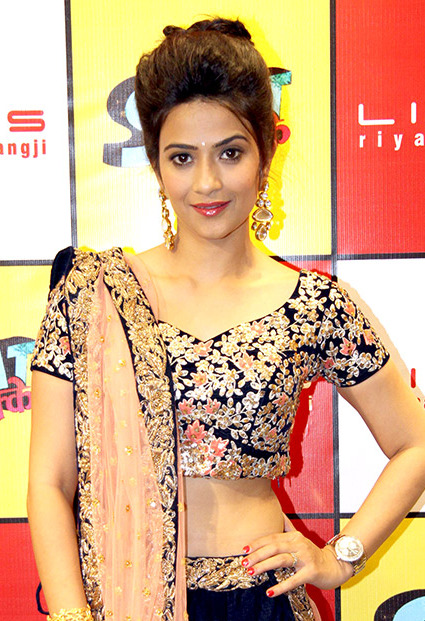
- Born: Aditi Dev Sharma; 24 August 1983 (age 43); Lucknow, Uttar Pradesh, India
- Occupation: Actress
- Years active: 2006–present
- Known for: Gangaa; Silsila Badalte Rishton Ka; Katha Ankahee; Shayad Yahi Hai Pyaar
- Spouse: Sarwar Ahuja (m. 2014)
- Children: 2

Aditi Sharma (pronounced [əˈd̪ɪt̪i ˈʃəɾmaː]; born 24 August 1983) is an Indian actress known for her performances in Hindi,Telugu and Punjabi films, television and advertisements. She has appeared in various projects, including India's Best Cinestars Ki Khoj, Gangaa, Silsila Badalte Rishton Ka, Katha Ankahee, Shayad Yahi Hai Pyaar and the film Angrej.

== Life and family ==
Aditi Sharma was born on 24 August 1983 in Lucknow, India, to Dr. Devinder Sharma and Anila Sharma. Hailing from North-west Punjab, she comes from a Brahmin family. She has studied Bachelor of Commerce (Hons) from Sri Venkateswara College, Delhi University. Aditi has an elder sister named Shweta Sharma and a younger brother named Bhavya Sharma, who is a doctor. Currently, her family resides in Lucknow.

In 2014, Aditi Sharma married Sarwar Ahuja, an actor from Bollywood. They met when they were contestants in the 2004 Zee TV talent hunt reality show India's Best Cinestars Ki Khoj. The couple had two children, son Sartaaj in 2019 and daughter Sitara in 2024.

== Career ==
Sharma began her career in the entertainment industry in 2004 as the winner of the talent hunting show India's Best Cinestars Ki Khoj, which premiered on Zee TV. In 2007, she made her film debut with Khanna & Iyer, portraying the characters Nandini Iyer. She ventured into Telugu cinema with the film Gunde Jhallumandi in 2008, where she played the character Neelu. In 2010, Aditi appeared in the Telugu film Om Shanti, where she played the role of Anjali.In 2011, she portrayed Rajjo in Mausam and Saira Rashid in Ladies vs Ricky Bahl (2011). Aditi Sharma portrayed the character of Mala in Kuch Khatta Kuch Meetha.

She also worked in the Telugu film Babloo (2011). In 2014, she played the role of Tanya Shrivastav in the Hindi film Ekkees Toppon Ki Salaami. In the Punjabi film Angrej (2015), Sharma portrayed the character Maarho. Continuing her journey in Hindi cinema, Aditi Sharma appeared as Sona in the 2016 film Saat Uchakkey. She acted in Punjabi films such as Subedar Joginder Singh (2018), where she played the character of Gurdyal Kaur Banga, and Laatu (2018), where she portrayed the role of Jeeti. She has appeared in films such as Golak Bugni Bank Te Batua, a Punjabi comedy-drama in 2018, she also did a cameo appearance as Salma in the film Nankana. In 2015, Sharma received critical acclaim for her portrayal of Gangaa Shukla, a lawyer, in the TV series Gangaa on &TV. Sharma played the role of Dr. Mauli Khanna in the TV series Silsila Badalte Rishton Ka on Colors TV from 2018 to 2019.

In 2020, she acted in the Punjabi film Ikko Mikke as Dimple, a theatre artist. In 2021, she played the role of Babita in the Punjabi film Teeja Punjab. In 2023, Sharma is appeared as Sifat in the Punjabi film Chal Jindiyae opposite to Kulwinder Billa. Sharma last seen in the show Katha Ankahee opposite Adnan Khan. This show is an official remake of the Turkish drama Binbir Gece but it has taken creative liberties to differentiate nuances and make it more relatable to an Indian audience. In 2024, Aditi Sharma appeared as Harjot in the Punjabi film Parahuna 2 with Ranjit Bawa.

== Filmography ==
=== Films ===
| Year | Title | Role | Language | Ref |
|---|---|---|---|---|
| 2007 | Khanna & Iyer | Nandini & Iyer | Hindi | |
| 2008 | Black & White | Shagufta | Hindi | |
| 2008 | Gunde Jhallumandi | Neelu | Telugu | |
| 2010 | Om Shanti | Anjali | Telugu | |
| 2011 | Mausam | Rajjo | Hindi | |
| 2011 | Ladies vs Ricky Bahl | Saira Rashid | Hindi | |
| 2011 | Rasta Pyar Ka | | Hindi | |
| 2011 | Kuch Khatta Kuch Meetha | Mala | Hindi | |
| 2011 | Babloo | Pooja | Telugu | |
| 2014 | Ekkees Toppon Ki Salaami | Tanya Shrivastav | Hindi | |
| 2015 | Angrej | Maarho | Punjabi | |
| 2016 | Saat Uchakkey | Sona | Hindi | |
| 2018 | Subedar Joginder Singh | Gurdyal Kaur Banga | Punjabi | |
| 2018 | Golak Bugni Bank Te Batua | Shindi | Punjabi | |
| 2018 | Nankana | Salma | Punjabi | |
| 2018 | Laatu | Jeeti | Punjabi | |
| 2020 | Ikko Mikke | Dimple (theatre artiste) | Punjabi | |
| 2021 | Teeja Punjab | Babita | Punjabi | |
| 2023 | Chal Jindiyae | Sifat | Punjabi | |
| 2024 | Parahuna 2 | Harjot | Punjabi | |

=== Television ===
| Year | Title | Role |
|---|---|---|
| 2006 | India's Best Cinestars Ki Khoj | Herself |
| 2012 | Teri Meri Love Stories | Anjali (Episode 16) |
| 2012 | Lakhon Mein Ek - Venkatlaxmi | Venkatlaxmi (Episode 18) |
| 2015–2017 | Gangaa | Gangaa Shukla |
| 2015 | Badii Devrani | Guest (as Gangaa) |
| 2016 | Santoshi Maa | Guest (as Gangaa) |
| 2016 | Badho Bahu | Guest (as Gangaa) |
| 2016 | Waaris | Guest (as Gangaa) |
| 2016 | Yeh Kahan Aa Gaye Hum | Guest (as Gangaa) |
| 2017 | Ek Vivah Aisa Bhi | Guest (as Gangaa) |
| 2018–2019 | Silsila Badalte Rishton Ka | Dr. Mauli Khanna |
| 2018 | Shakti - Astitva Ke Ehsaas Ki | Guest (as Mauli) |
| 2022–2023 | Katha Ankahee | Katha Singh |
| 2026–present | Shayad Yahi Hai Pyaar | Preeti Arora |

== Awards and nominations ==
| Year | Award | Category | Work | Result | Ref |
|---|---|---|---|---|---|
| 2016 | PTC Punjabi Film Awards | Best Actress Debut | Angrej | Won | |
| 2016 | Indian Television Academy Awards | Best Actress (Popular) | Gangaa | Nominated | |
| 2018 | Indian Television Academy Awards | Best Actress (Jury) | Silsila Badalte Rishton Ka | Nominated | |
| 2019 | Indian Telly Awards | Best Actress (Jury) | Silsila Badalte Rishton Ka | Nominated | |
| 2023 | Indian Television Academy Awards | Best Actress (Jury) | Katha Ankahee | Won | |

== See also ==
- List of Hindi television actresses
- List of Indian television actresses
