= Gathbandhan =

Indian television series

- Also known as: Kanoon Aur Crime Ka Gathbandhan
- Genre: Action; Drama; Romance
- Created by: Jay Mehta; Kinnari Mehta
- Written by: R. M. Joshi; Neha Singh
- Screenplay by: Akash Deep
- Story by: Akash Deep
- Directed by: Ankur Narendra Bhatia
- Starring: See below
- Country of origin: India
- Original language: Hindi
- No. of seasons: 1
- No. of episodes: 224

Production
- Producer: Jay Mehta
- Production locations: Mumbai, India
- Cinematography: Maneesh Malik
- Camera setup: Multi-camera
- Running time: 20–23 minutes
- Production company: Jay Production

Original release
- Network: Colors TV
- Release: 15 January – 27 November 2019

Gathbandhan (transl. Alliance) is an Indian television action drama romance series that was aired from 15 January to 27 November 2019 on Colors TV by airing 224 episodes. Produced by Jay Mehta under Jay Production, it starred Shruti Sharma, Abrar Qazi and Sonali Naik. It is the love story of Don of Dombivli Mumbai and IPS from Surendranagar

== Plot ==
Dhanak Parekh from Surendranagar, Gujarat and Raghu Bharat Jadhav from Mumbai, Maharashtra, are two people with clashing personalities who ultimately become tied by the strings of marriage, friendship, and love.

Raghu is a petty criminal, a goon who has a fearsome reputation. Shortly he becomes one of the most powerful Dons in Mumbai. Savitri, his mother, controls their organization, and encourages him to resort to violent acts to increase their wealth and reputation. Dhanak is an aspiring IPS officer who keeps on the right side of the law. Raghu falls in love with her at first sight and forces her into marriage by holding her family as hostages. Dhanak hates Raghu and his lawlessness at first, but soon falls for him. After that she started loving him more than anything, even more than her life. Savitri and Maya, one of Raghu's friends, try to create misunderstandings between the pair, but they always manage to sort things out.

When Raghu's father, Bharat, returns after being presumed dead, things get more complicated. Bharat and his companions engage in acts of terrorism, which leads Dhanak to lose her job. They then kidnap her sister. Raghu tries to save her, but fails, she is killed by Bharat and he blames her death on Raghu; even thinks Dhanak's sister was killed by him. As pressure builds around Raghu, he begins to believe himself guilty. He is arrested and sentenced to jail for five years.

=== 5 years later ===
Raghu is released and returns to see Dhanak and their son Raunak. Despite still madly loving him, she asks him to stay away because she has still not forgiven him for her sister's death also getting tensed about her child's future. Akshay, Dhanak's boss and friend, tries to separate Raghu and Dhanak forever. However, Raghu becomes an incredibly successful businessman in Mumbai after he sets up his new company RJ Industries, and eventually hires both Akshay and Dhanak as his staff.

Soon Dhanak falls for Raghu again, because she can't hold her love and affection for Raghu by faking it. Raghu, Dhanak and Raunak are reunited, and Savitri comes to love and accept her daughter-in-law.

Again Maya and Akshay collaborate to destroy Raghu by framing a murder which he didn't commit. But Raghu, Dhanak and their family reunites to prove his innocence and defeats Maya and Akshay.

== Cast ==
=== Main ===
- Shruti Sharma as ACP Dhanak Raghu Jadhav – Mahendra's eldest daughter; Parag, Sejal and Preeti's sister; Raghu's wife; Raunak's mother
- Abrar Qazi as Raghu Bharat Jadhav – Savitri and Bharat's son; Dhanak's husband; Raunak's father

=== Recurring ===
- Sonali Naik as Savitri "Mai" Jadhav – Bharat's wife; Raghu's mother; Raunak's grandmother
- Sanjay Batra as Bharat Jadhav – Savitri's husband; Raghu's father; Raunak's grandfather
- Veer Bhanushali as Raunak Jadhav – Dhanak and Raghu's son
- Kinshuk Mahajan as Akshay Kapoor – Dhanak's obsessed lover
- Pragati Chourasiya as Maya Jaiswal – Raghu's obsessed lover
- Nitin Goswami as ACP Ramesh Tawade – Corrupt officer
- Varsha Dhandale as Shakubai – Savitri's friend
- Smitha as Manorama Parekh – Mahendra's mother; Parag, Dhanak, Sejal and Preeti's grandmother
- Rajiv Kumar as Mahendra Parekh – Manorama's son; Parag, Dhanak, Sejal and Preeti's father; Raunak's grandfather
- Priyanka Chahar Choudhary as Sejal Parekh – Mahendra's second daughter; Parag, Dhanak and Preeti's sister; Vikram's ex-fiancée
- Alisha Parveen Khan as Preeti Parekh – Mahendra's youngest daughter; Parag, Dhanak and Sejal's sister (Dead)
- Abbas Ghaznavi as Parag Parekh – Mahendra's son; Dhanak, Sejal and Preeti's brother
- Tanay Aul as Aslam Sheikh – Raghu's namesake brother
- Sahitya Pansare as Sunil Kumar Singh – Raghu's namesake brother
- Nisha Pareek as Sheetal Shrivastav
- Sapna Thakur as Lakshmi Gaitonde
- Amit Pandey as Deven
- Imran Nazir Khan as Director Ganesh

=== Special appearances ===
- Gauahar Khan
- Mika Singh
- Drashti Dhami

== Adaptation ==
The plot is taken and started airing in Star Maa called Neevelle Neevelle from 21 December 2020 replacing Big Boss season 4 and which ended on 17 July 2021 completing 159 episodes.
