= Aishwarya Sakhuja =

Indian model turned actress

Aishwarya Sakhuja-Nag
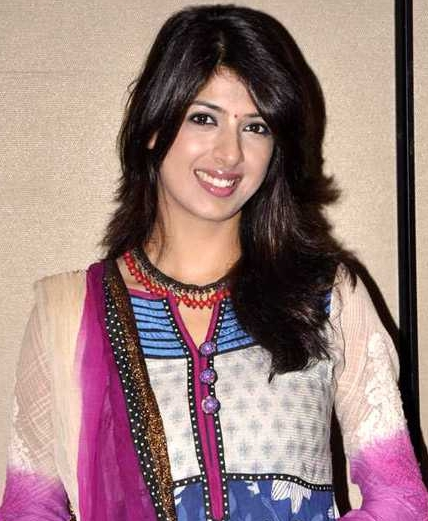
- Sakhuja-Nag in 2014
- Occupations: Model, Actress
- Years active: 2007—present
- Spouse: Rohit Nag (m. 2014)

Aishwarya Sakhuja-Nag (née Sakhuja) is an Indian model and actress. She was a Miss India finalist in 2006. She is primarily known for her roles in Saas Bina Sasural as Toasty, Ahaana Khurana in Yeh Hai Chahatein and Air hostess Shilpa Shrivastava in Zyada Mat Udd. She was also a contestant on reality shows Nach Baliye 7 and Fear Factor: Khatron Ke Khiladi 7. Since September 2026, she is seen in Shayad Yahi Hai Pyaar.

== Personal life ==
Sakhuja-Nag married her longtime boyfriend Rohit Nag on 5 December 2014.

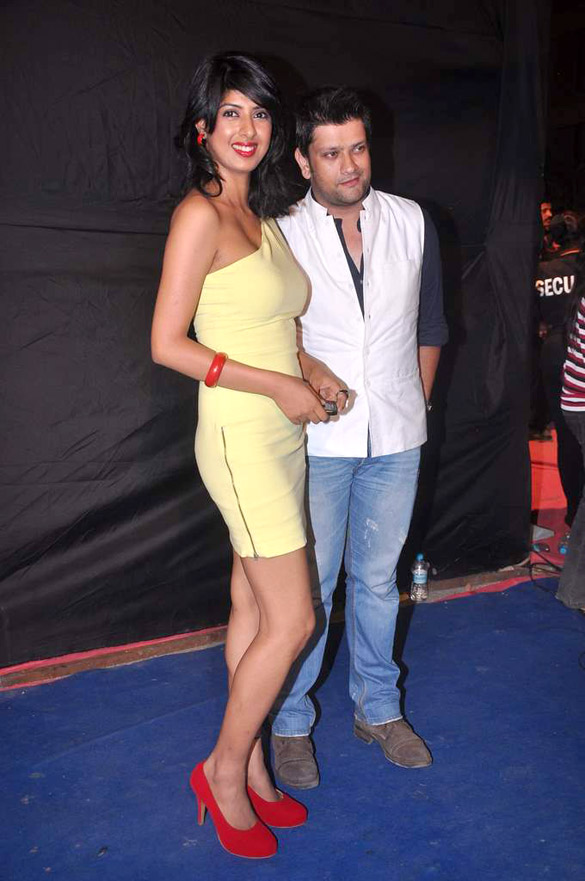
Sakhuja-Nag with husband Rohit Nag in 2012

== Filmography ==
=== Films ===
Year	Film	Role	Ref(s)
2011	U R My Jaan	Nisha	
2019	Ujda Chaman	Ekta	

=== Television ===
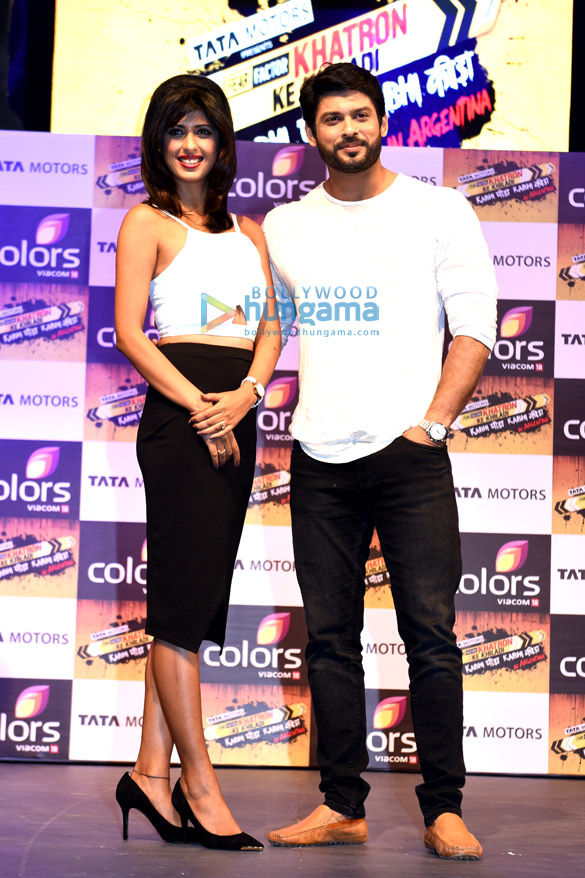
Sakhuja-Nag with Sidharth Shukla at the launch of Khatron Ke Khiladi in 2016

Year	Show	Role	Ref(s)
2008–2009	Hello Kaun? Pehchaan Kaun	Host	
2010	Lift Kara De	Host	
2010	Rishta.com	Sukhrit Singh	
2010–2012	Saas Bina Sasural	Tanya (Toasty) Tej Prakash Chaturvedi	
2010	Baat Hamari Pakki Hai	Guest (as Tanya)	
2010	Kaun Banega Crorepati 4	Guest (as Herself)	
2011	Jhalak Dikhhla Jaa 4	Guest (as Herself)	
2013	Welcome – Baazi Mehmaan Nawazi Ki	Contestant	
2013	Nach Baliye Shriman v/s Shrimati	Host	
2013	India's Dancing Superstar	Host	
2013	Yeh Hai Aashiqui	Harleen	
2013–2014	Main Naa Bhoolungi	Shikha Avinash Gupta/Samaira Seth	
2014	Itna Karo Na Mujhe Pyaar	Guest (as Herself)	
2015	Comedy Classes	Guest (as Herself)	
2015	Nach Baliye 7	Contestant	
2016	Fear Factor: Khatron Ke Khiladi 7	Contestant	
2016	Box Cricket League 2	Contestant	
2016	Comedy Nights Bachao	Guest (as Herself)	
2016	Krishnadasi	Guest (as Herself)	
2016	Khidki	Anju	
2016–2017	Trideviyaan	Dhanashree (Dhanu) Shaurya Chauhan	
2017	Sarabhai vs Sarabhai: Take 2	Sonia	
2018	Chandrashekhar	Kamala Nehru	
2019–2021	Yeh Hai Chahatein	Ahana Singhania Khurana / Ahana Singhania Pillai	
2023	Junooniyatt	Dr. Pari Ahuja	
2025	Zyada Mat Udd	Shilpa Srivastava	
2026–present	Shayad Yahi Hai Pyaar	Sandhya "Sandy" Ahuja	
