= Sargun Kaur Luthra =

Indian television actress

- Born: 24 November 1998 (age 27); Delhi, India
- Occupation: Actress
- Years active: 2017–present
- Notable work: Yeh Hai Chahatein

Sargun Kaur Luthra is an Indian television and film actress. She is known for portraying Niyati Khanna Aneja in Tantra, and the dual portrayal of Dr. Preesha Srinivasan Khurana and Dr. Nayantara Iyer Choudhary in Yeh Hai Chahatein.

== Early life ==
Luthra was born on 24 November 1998 in New Delhi, India. She did her schooling at Guru Harkrishan Public School, New Delhi. She took up psychology in college but decided to pursue acting instead, choosing to drop out in the first year. She has a twin brother, named Harman Luthra.

== Career ==
After quitting her studies for acting, she made her television debut in 2017 with Star Bharat's thriller Kaal Bhairav Rahasya as Gauri. In 2018, she was seen in a cameo in Star Bharat's fantasy drama Mayavi Maling. Later from 2018 to 2019, she played Niyati Khanna in Colors TV's horror drama series, Tantra.

In 2019, she got the role of Aayat Ganai in the drama Kasganj and since December 2019, Luthra has been portraying Dr Preesha Srinivasan Khurana in Star Plus's Yeh Hai Chahatein opposite Abrar Qazi She quit the series after a period of 4 years.

In 2020, she played Priya, Naga Shaurya's character's sister, in Aswathama, making her film debut. In 2026, she joined Luv Ranjan's Pehla Pyaar Doosri Baar marking her Bollywood debut.

== Filmography ==
=== Films ===
Year	Title	Role	Language	Ref.
2020	Aswathama	Priya	Telugu	
2026	Pehla Pyaar Doosri Baar	Shivi Pradhan	Hindi	

=== Television ===
Year	Title	Role	Notes	Ref.
2017–2018	Kaal Bhairav Rahasya	Gauri		
2018	Mayavi Maling	Fake Maharani Pranali		
2018	Bigg Boss 12	Niyati Khanna	Guest appearance	
2018–2019	Tantra	Niyati Khanna Aneja		
2019	Dar Ki Dastak	Nisha	Episode 6	
2019–2022	Yeh Hai Chahatein	Dr. Preesha Srinivasan Khurana		
2022–2023	Yeh Hai Chahatein	Dr. Nayantara "Nayan" Iyer Choudhary		
2022	Ravivaar With Star Parivaar	Dr. Preesha Khurana	Episode 1,4,7,16	

=== Web series ===
Year	Title	Role	Notes	Ref.
2019	Kasganj	Aayat Ganai	Zee5 series	

=== Music videos ===
Year	Title	Singer(s)	Ref.
2017	Achhi Lagti Ho	Vijay Jammers, Addy Nagar	
2018	Kalesh	Mika Singh, Millind Gaba	
2024	Chahun	Stebin Ben, Neeti Mohan	
2024	Teri Akhiyaan	Danny	
2025	Jeene Do	Gajendra Verma	
2025	Ni Billo	Semwal	
