= Kothha =

Indian Bengali television series

- Genre: Drama; Romance; Comedy
- Written by: Dialogues; Poushali Ghosh Dostidar
- Screenplay by: Sadip Bhattacharya
- Story by: Sadip Bhattacharya
- Directed by: Suman Das; Pavel Ghosh
- Creative directors: Saswati Ghosh; Dishani Sen; Priyanka Biswas
- Starring: Susmita Dey; Saheb Bhattacharya
- Composer: Indradeep Dasgupta
- Country of origin: India
- Original language: Bengali
- No. of episodes: 662

Production
- Executive producers: Rumpa Deb (Bangla Talkies); Samajita, Arpita & Akash (Star Jalsha)
- Producers: Nitesh Sharma; Nandini Sharma
- Production location: Kolkata
- Cinematography: Deepak Jha
- Editors: Ayan Ray; Dibakar Ray
- Camera setup: Multi-camera
- Running time: 22 minutes
- Production company: Bangla Talkies

Original release
- Network: Star Jalsha
- Release: 15 December 2023 – 6 October 2025

Kothha is an Indian Bengali language romantic drama television series that premiered from 15 December 2023 on Star Jalsha. It went off air on 6 October 2025. It starred Sushmita Dey and Saheb Bhattacharya in lead roles.

== Plot ==
The story revolves around girl named Kothha (Kathakali), a student of botany, who loves gardening. On the other hand the hero AV is a chef. It is to be seen how they fall in love with each other.

== Cast ==
=== Main ===
- Susmita Dey as Kothhakali Guha (nee Basu) a.k.a. Kothha / Gobordebi, AV's wife, Chiki's biological mother, Muffin's adoptive mother, a student of botany who loves gardening.
  - As Buli (in disguise) - a street-smart girl who wants to open a cosmetic shop.
- Saheb Bhattacharya as Agnibha "Agni" Guha a.k.a. AV / Panchokmoshai, Kothha's husband, Chiki's biological father, Muffin's adoptive father, a chef.

=== Recurring ===
- Megha Daw as Mandavi Banerjee a.k.a. Mandy, AV's friend and obsessive lover
- Sumanta Mukherjee as Shashibhushan "Shashi" Guha, Phonibhushan's younger brother, Renu's husband, patriarch of the Guha family
- Tanuka Chatterjee as Renuka "Renu" Guha; Shashibhushan's wife, matriarch of the Guha family
- Arijit Chowdhury as Samir Kumar Guha -Shashi and Renu's elder son, AV's father
- Moyna Banerjee as Sanchita Guha, Samir's wife, Shashi and Renu's elder daughter-in-law, AV's mother
- Priyam as Mihir Kumar Guha - Shashi and Renu's middle son
- Arpita Mukherjee as Chitra Guha - Mihir's wife, Shashi and Renu's middle daughter-in-law
- Antaraa Pakira Nandi as Lekha Sarkar (nee Guha), Shashi and Renu's only daughter, Mrinmoy Sarkar's widow
- Siddhartha Ghosh as Timir Kumar Guha - Shashi and Renu's youngest son
- Indrakshi Nag as Nupur Guha, Timir's wife, Shashi and Renu's youngest daughter-in-law
- Rob Dey as Ankit Guha a.k.a. Akki - Mihir and Chitra's son, Juni's husband, Chiki's adoptive father.
- Diya Mukherjee as Ujjaini Guha (nee Mitra) a.k.a. Juni - Arun and Tapati's daughter, Kotha's cousin, Prantik's ex-wife; Ankit's wife, Chiki's adoptive mother.
- Priyanka Banerjee as Arna Guha a.k.a. Annie, Mihir and Chitra's daughter
- Arindya Banerjee as Inspector Prattay Sarkar a.k.a. Pratty, Lekha's son
- Raima Sengupta as Rituparna a.k.a. Ritu - Kotha and Juni's college friend, Prattay's love interest and later, wife
- Olivia Malakar as Priyanjali Sarkar a.k.a. Pri, Lekha's daughter
- Sourav Chatterjee as Niladri Mitra a.k.a. Nilu / Harry (in disguise) - Kotha and Juni's maternal cousin brother, Pri's husband
- Debnath Chattopadhyay as Arun Mitra - Juni's father, Kotha's maternal uncle
- Shreyasee Samanta as Tapati Mitra - Arun's wife, Juni's mother
- Samir Biswas as Phonibhushan Guha - Shashibhushan's elder brother, Lekha, Samir, Mihir and Timir's elder paternal uncle
- Anamika Saha as Phonibhushan's wife, Lekha, Samir, Mihir and Timir's elder paternal aunt,
- Anirban Bhattacharya as Joydeb Biswas - owner of Biswas Group of Companies, Prantik's father, Shashibhushan's arch rival
- Sayantan Shaan Sarkar as Prantik Biswas - Joydeb's son, Juni's ex-husband, Kotha & AV's arch rival
- Kaushik Bhattacharya as Aashish Roy a.k.a. Roy Babu - Kotha and AV's client, Sanchita's adoptive brother.
- Bipul Patra as Pramith Biswas a.k.a. Pramith Sharma - Joydeb's son, Prantik's brother
- Shweta Mishra as Richa Basu - Roy Babu's client from Singapore who wants to take over AV's cafe, Kothha's step sister.
- Kaushik Chakraborty as Basu-guruji, an international terrorist, Kothha and Richa's father.
- Sreenika Ghoshal as Basundhara "Muffin" Guha, Kothha and Agnibha's adopted daughter.
- Sreyansha Das as Rupkatha "Chiki" Guha, Kothha and Agnibha's biological daughter, Juni and Ankit's adopted daughter.
- Trishan Ghosh as Rayan, Chiki and Muffin's school friend.
- Sritama Bhattacharya as Laali, Chiki and Muffin's Nanny, Chitra's aid.

== Adaptations ==
Language	Title	Channel	First aired	Last aired	Notes
Bengali	Kothha	Star Jalsha	15 December 2023	6 October 2025	Original
Hindi	Kabhi Neem Neem Kabhi Shahad Shahad	StarPlus	6 June 2025	22 September 2025	Remake
