= Mere Papa Hero Hiralal =

- Created by: Ashvini Yardi
- Starring: Sarwar Ahuja; Riva Arora; Krishna Singh Bisht ( Shankar)
- Country of origin: India
- Original language: Hindi
- No. of seasons: 1
- No. of episodes: 65

Production
- Producers: Ashvini Yardi; Sachin Yardi
- Running time: 22 minutes
- Production company: Viniyard Films

Original release
- Network: Discovery Jeet
- Release: 12 February – 11 May 2018

Mere Papa Hero Hiralal is an Indian television series starring Sarwar Ahuja and Riva Arora. It is produced by Viniyard Films and premiered on 12 February 2018, on Discovery Jeet. The show is also available on Netflix.

The show is based on the real-life story of a rickshaw driver. The project is headed by Santosh Shendye and Payal Chandan while Mohammad Faizan is the creative Producer of the show.

The episodes have been written by Saurabh Jain and Saheb while the creative Director of the show is Dhananjay Mulay.

== Cast ==
- Sarwar Ahuja as Hiralal Tiwari
- Riva Arora as Gungun
- Ashima Bhalla as Inspector Mina
