= Anaganaga Oka Raju =

2026 film by Maari

- Theatrical release poster
- Directed by: Maari
- Written by: Naveen Polishetty; Chinmay Gatrazu
- Produced by: Suryadevara Naga Vamsi; Sai Soujanya
- Starring: Naveen Polishetty; Meenakshi Chaudhary
- Cinematography: J. Yuvaraj
- Edited by: Vamsi Atluri
- Music by: Mickey J Meyer
- Production companies: Sithara Entertainments; Fortune Four Cinemas
- Release date: 14 January 2026
- Running time: 147 minutes
- Country: India
- Language: Telugu
- Box office: ₹100.20 crore

Anaganaga Oka Raju (transl. Once upon a time, a king) is a 2026 Indian Telugu-language comedy drama film directed by Maari. Produced by Suryadevara Naga Vamsi and Sai Soujanya, under Sithara Entertainments and Fortune Four Cinemas, the film stars Naveen Polishetty and Meenakshi Chaudhary. It was released on 14 January 2026, coinciding with Sankranthi. The film received positive reviews from critics, praising the humor and performances.

== Plot ==
Raju, the grandson of a once-powerful and rich zamindar, inherits nothing but a famous surname after his grandfather squanders the family fortune on indulgence and misguided generosity. Determined to preserve the illusion of wealth, Raju continues to pose as a rich man in his village. Humiliated at a friend’s lavish wedding, he resolves to restore his status by marrying into money. At a village fair, he meets Charulatha and, with the help of his loyal assistant and friends, launches “Operation Charulatha” to win her heart. Their plan succeeds, and the two marry.

However, on their wedding night, Raju receives a shocking letter from his father-in-law revealing that Charulatha’s family is bankrupt. He soon discovers that Charulatha and her father had orchestrated the marriage under the assumption that Raju was wealthy and could rescue them financially. Realizing they have both deceived each other, the couple confronts the consequences of their ambitions.

Provoked by the cunning villager Erribabu, Raju enters local politics, contesting elections against him with the initial aim of making quick money through corruption. His unconventional, social media-driven campaign unexpectedly goes viral, pressuring the local MLA to improve infrastructure and public facilities in the village. As tensions rise, the MLA backing Erribabu offers Raju a bribe of 20 crores to withdraw. Persuaded that the money could save his father-in-law’s home, Raju accepts, in exchange of recording a video insulting the villagers, which Erribabu spreads widely.

On election day, the truth emerges: Raju has secretly used the bribe money to reclaim lands that villagers were forced to mortgage—lands rich in oil reserves that the MLA had hoped to exploit. By protecting the village’s future, Raju earns the people’s trust, defeats Erribabu, and transforms from a pretender chasing wealth into a leader who finally lives up to his family name.

== Cast ==
- Naveen Polishetty as Raju and Gouravapuram Goparaju, Raju's grandfather
- Meenakshi Chaudhary as Charulatha "Charu"
- Rao Ramesh as Pedapalem Bhupathi Raju, Charu’s father
- Tarak Ponnappa as Erri Babu
- Goparaju Ramana as Muhurthala Murthy, Marriage broker
- Chammak Chandra as Gumastha, Raju’s assistant
- Ananth Babu as Priest
- Madhusudhan Rao as MLA Ramamurthy, Erribabu's elder brother
- Mamilla Shailaja Priya as Raju’s mother
- Sivannarayana Naripeddi as Raju’s wedding alliance’s father
- Jhansi as Parijatham, Raju’s relative
- Mukku Avinash as Buchibabu, Parijatham’s son
- Mahesh Achanta as Raju’s friend
- Bhadram as Raju’s friend
- Rocket Raghava as Dr Pasupathi
- Pammi Sai as Election Officer
- Kadambari Kiran Kumar as Peetambari’s father
- Rohini Reddy as Anchor
- Laddu Santosh
- Prasad Addala
- Bheemala Revanth Pavan Sai Subhash
- Saanve Megghana in a cameo appearance as a dancer in the song "Andhra to Telangana"
- Faria Abdullah in cameo appearance as Peetambari
- Ambati Srinivas as MLA Ramamurthy's assistant

== Production ==
Sithara Entertainments and Fortune Four Cinemas announced the project in September 2021, with Kalyan Shankar set to make his supposed directorial debut, featuring Naveen Polishetty in the lead role. In January 2022, the title of the film Anaganaga Oka Raju was unveiled by the makers. Initially, Thaman S was announced as the music composer, but was replaced by Mickey J. Meyer. In 2023, it was reported that director Kalyan Shankar was replaced by Maari due to creative differences between the makers. Initially, Sreeleela was considered for the female lead, before Meenakshi Chaudhary was confirmed as the female lead in December 2024. The filming began in February 2025 and was completed within a six-month schedule.

== Music ==
The music was composed by Mickey J. Meyer. The audio rights of the film were acquired by Aditya Music. The first single, titled "Bhimavaram Balma", was released on 27 November 2025. It marked Naveen Polishetty's debut as a singer. The second single, titled "Raju Gaari Pelli Ro", was released on 26 December 2025.

All lyrics are written by Chandrabose.

No.	Title	Singer(s)	Length
1.	"Bhimavaram Balma"	Naveen Polishetty, Nutana Mohan	2:49
2.	"Raju Gaari Pelli Ro"	Anurag Kulkarni, Sameera Bharadwaj	3:39
3.	"Andhra to Telangana"	Dhanunjay Seepana, Sameera Bharadwaj	2:54
Total length:			9:22

== Release ==
Anaganaga Oka Raju was released on 14 January 2026.

=== Home Media ===
The digital streaming rights were acquired by Netflix, and it started streaming on 11 February 2026.

== Reception ==
=== Critical reception ===
Risha Ganguly of Times Now rated the film 3.5/5 stars and wrote, "Anaganaga Oka Raju is an entertaining, one-man comedy carried almost entirely by Naveen Polishetty. While the story is predictable and the writing uneven, sharp dialogues, situational humour, and energetic songs make it a more than decent festive watch." Sandeep Athreya of Sakshi Post rated the film 3.25/5 stars and wrote, "It may not be Polishetty’s funniest outing yet, but his presence alone makes it an enjoyable ride."

Suresh Kavirayani of Cinema Express rated the film 3/5 stars and wrote, "Like his earlier films, Naveen Polishetty dominates the show with his natural performance and humour. Though a few scenes in the second half feel dragged, the film delivers enough laughs to keep the audience entertained." Sangeetha Devi Dundoo of The Hindu wrote, "Anaganaga Oka Raju could have benefitted with sharper, crisper writing. Despite the uneven narrative, Naveen’s comic timing and Meenakshi’s graceful screen presence make the film immensely watchable."

Swaroop Kodur of The Indian Express rated the film 3/5 stars and wrote, "Naveen Polishetty strikes good form yet again and shoulders a simple, low-stakes comedy-drama entirely on his own." Sruthi Ganapathy Raman of The Hollywood Reporter India wrote, "A light hand at writing and a hilarious Naveen Polishetty largely carry this film through a slippery second half." Sashidhar Adivi of Filmfare rated the film 3/5 stars and wrote, "Anaganaga Oka Raju is a crackling entertainer that thrives on Naveen Polishetty’s impeccable comic timing and infectious energy."

Jalapathi Gudelli of Telugucinema.com gave the film 2.75/5 stars and wrote, "Anaganaga Oka Raju offers a few funny one-liners and occasional hilarious moments, but it is weighed down by familiarity and dragging portions. It works as a time-pass entertainer, yet offers nothing new." BVS Prakash of Deccan Chronicle wrote, "Naveen Polishetty is effective in light-hearted roles and once again livens up the screen with his swag and humour. However, even his charm cannot salvage the weak story, especially as the second half drags."

=== Box office ===
After five days of its release, the film has grossed ₹58 crore worldwide.
