= Zyada Mat Udd =

2025 Indian television sitcom

- Genre: Sitcom
- Starring: Shehzad Shaikh; Helly Shah
- Country of origin: India
- Original language: Hindi
- No. of seasons: 1
- No. of episodes: 30

Production
- Camera setup: Multi-camera
- Running time: 20-27 minutes
- Production company: Yoodlee Films

Original release
- Network: Colors TV
- Release: 8 March – 15 June 2025

Zyada Mat Udd is an Indian Hindi language sitcom television series which aired from 8 March 2025 to 15 June 2025 on Colors TV and is also digitally available on JioHotstar. Produced by Yoodlee Films.

== Plot ==
Goldie Khurana, heir to Air-Aasman Airlines, expects to inherit control of the company following the untimely death of his father. However, the airline's board requires him to prove himself by winning the coveted Flight Attendant of the Year award before he can take over. Goldie therefore goes undercover as Gopal, a rookie steward, and begins working as part of the airline's cabin crew.

Kajal Thakkar is a confident and ambitious air hostess who views Air-Aasman as a route to a luxurious life. Believing that marrying a wealthy man will secure her future, she is unaware that her fellow crew member Gopal is actually the airline's heir. Shilpa Srivastava, the sharp and authoritative head stewardess, runs the cabin crew strictly and makes sure that Gopal faces the full difficulties of the job.

As the airline's incompetent crew repeatedly turn routine flights into chaotic and comic disasters, Gopal must navigate the pressures of his new role while concealing his true identity. With Kajal unaware of his status and Shilpa determined to keep him in line, Goldie's attempt to earn the award and prove himself increasingly becomes a struggle to maintain his cover amid the crew's constant misadventures.

== Cast ==
- Shehzad Shaikh as Goldie Khurana / Gopal Bajaj: Satish's son, heir of Air Aasman airlines turned flight attendant turned new owner of Air Aasman airlines
- Helly Shah as Kajal Thakkar: flight attendant; Jagrati's daughter
- Aishwarya Sakhuja as Shilpa Srivastava: Chief flight attendant
- Tanu Khan as Anu Arora Ahluwalia: Ranjeet's wife and co-pilot; Gagan's mother.
- Rewati Chetri as Liza Wangsu: flight attendant
- Bhawsheel Singh Sahni as Chanpreet "Touchy" Chatwal: flight attendant
- Gaurav Amlani as Anees Rizvi: flight attendant; Ammi's son
- Vivek Mushran as Satish Khurana: Gopal's father, former owner of Air Aasman airlines
- Vishal Malhotra as Ranjeet Arora: Anu's husband and co-pilot; Gagan's father
- Rajesh Balwani as Ferrero: Goldie's caretaker
- Vishal Joshi as Shridhar: flight attendant inspection officer
- Prayag as Shrimaan: flight attendant inspection officer
- Bhakti Rathod as Jagrati Thakkar: Kajal's mother
- Sham Mashalkar as Dr. Shabir
- Kunal Karan Kapoor as Vikram Nanda
- Kamaljeet Rana as Dildeep Singh
- Guddi Maruti as Ammi: Anees's mother
- Neelu Kohli as Lovely: Chandpreet's aunt
- Charu Mehra as Avni
- Jay Pathak as Mahesh
- Unknown as Shalini Devi: Goldie's ex-girlfriend
- Unknown as Devika
- Bakhtiyaar Irani as Neenad Zhople

== Production ==
=== Development ===
In early March 2025, Colors TV announced a new series titled Zyada Mat Udd.

=== Casting ===
Aishwarya Sakhuja was cast as Shilpa Srivastava. Gaurav Amlani was chosen to play Anees Rizvi. Sham Mashalkar was selected to portray as Dr. Shabir.
