= Om Shanti (film) =

2010 film

- Film poster
- Directed by: Prakash Dantuluri
- Written by: Prakash Dantuluri
- Produced by: Priyanka Dutt
- Starring: Navdeep; Kajal Aggarwal; Nikhil Siddharth; Bindu Madhavi; Aditi Sharma
- Cinematography: Jayanan Vincent
- Edited by: Marthand K. Venkatesh
- Music by: Ilaiyaraaja
- Production company: Vyjayanthi Movies
- Release date: 13 January 2010
- Country: India
- Language: Telugu

Om Shanti is a 2010 Telugu-language film directed by Prakash Dantuluri. It stars Navdeep and Kajal Aggarwal, making it their third film together. Bindu Madhavi, Aditi Sharma, Nikhil Siddhartha, and R. Madhavan play supporting roles.

== Plot ==
Anand is a bachelor who works in a software company. Everything goes well for him and he is happy. He wants to settle down in life by getting married and meets Anjali in the process. Meghana is full of dreams, and she seeks thrills all the time. She is a college student and adores RJ Maddy madly. Teja is a struggling newcomer in the film industry and feels he has it in him to become the next Ravi Teja.

Noori's marriage is fixed with Akbar. Her brother plots to plant bombs in the main places of Hyderabad. Reddy is a farmer who loves his land and believes in agriculture. His son wants to sell off all the land so they can migrate to Hyderabad and live a plush life. Reddy dies, and his wife comes to Hyderabad along with her son's family. Meanwhile, Anand and Anjali fall in love. Everyone's lives and plans are suddenly endangered by the bomb blast planned by Noori's brother. Reddy's wife, Meghana, and Teja are all affected and while they try to fend off threats, Anand comes and saves the day.

== Cast ==
- Navdeep as Anand
- Kajal Aggarwal as Meghana
- Bindu Madhavi as Noori
- Aditi Sharma as Anjali
- Nikhil Siddharth as Teja
- Adivi Sesh as Aditya
- Murali Mohan as Reddy
- Pragathi as Reddy's wife
- Tanikella Bharani
- Kishore
- Suman Setty
- Sunil Ranadhir
- Ravi Kale
- Raghu Babu
- Siva Reddy
- Narasimha
- R. Madhavan as RJ Maddy (extended cameo appearance)

== Soundtrack ==
Music composed by Ilaiyaraaja. Songs received good response especially "Chinna Pokile" and Flying on the moon. Music released on Sony.

No.	Title	Singer(s)	Length
1.	"Chinna Polike"	Kunal Ganjawala, Sunidhi Chauhan
2.	"Chinna Polike (Sad)"	Kunal Ganjawala
3.	"Flying on the Moon"	Priya
4.	"Ottesi Chebutha"	Karthik
5.	"Chinna Polike (Sad)"	Sunidhi Chauhan
6.	"Om Shanthi"	Toshi Sabri
