= Papiya Sengupta =

Indian television actress

- Born: India
- Occupation: Actress
- Years active: 1995 - present
- Known for: Yeh Kahan Aa Gaye Hum; Qayamat Ki Raat; Pyaar Kii Ye Ek Kahaani

Papiya Sengupta is an Indian television actress, who has appeared in numerous Hindi television series, like Pyaar Kii Ye Ek Kahaani, Savdhaan India, Fear Files: Darr Ki Sacchi Tasvirein and Anamika. She appeared in Yeh Kahan Aa Gaye Hum. She played Uma Prithvi Singh Suryavanshi in the TV series Qayamat Ki Raat and lives at Chembur.

== Television ==
- Zee TV's Campus (1993–1997)
- Sony TV's O Maria (1995–1996) as Pearlie
- Doordarshan's Krishna (1993–1994) as Lalita Sakhi, Radha's best friend
- Zee TV's Janbaaz (1997)
- Star One's Pyaar Kii Ye Ek Kahaani 2010-2011 as Madhu Dobriyal
- Life OK's Savdhaan India
- Zee TV's Fear Files: Darr Ki Sacchi Tasvirein
- Sony TV's Anamika as Shalaka
- Sony TV's Main Naa Bhoolungi as Sunaina Jaggnath
- Sony TV's Bharat Ka Veer Putra - Maharana Pratap as Madhlsa Bai
- &TV's Yeh Kahan Aa Gaye Hum as Sonali Sabharwal
- Star Plus's Chandra Nandini as Rajmata Moora
- Alif Laila as Princess Gulafsha (The Street man and the Giant and Aladdin & Wonder Lamp)
- Star Plus's Qayamat Ki Raat as Uma Singh Sooryavanshi
- Zee TV's Brahmarakshas as Shalini Sharma 2020–2021
- Shubh Shagun as Kanika
- Jamai No. 1 as Kanchan Chotwani (2024)
