= Agent Sai Srinivasa Athreya =

2019 Indian film directed by Swaroop R. S. J.

- Theatrical release poster
- Directed by: Swaroop R. S. J.
- Screenplay by: Swaroop R. S. J. Naveen Polishetty
- Story by: Swaroop R. S. J.
- Produced by: Rahul Yadav Nakka
- Starring: Naveen Polishetty; Shruti Sharma
- Cinematography: Sunny Kurapati
- Edited by: Amit Tripathi
- Music by: Mark K. Robin
- Production company: Swadharm Entertainment
- Release date: 21 June 2019
- Running time: 143 minutes
- Country: India
- Language: Telugu
- Budget: ₹4 crore
- Box office: est. ₹20 crore

Agent Sai Srinivasa Athreya (stylized as Agent Sai) is a 2019 Indian Telugu-language black comedy mystery thriller film directed by Swaroop R. S. J., who co-wrote the film with Naveen Polishetty. The film stars Polishetty as the title character alongside Shruti Sharma in her Telugu debut. It follows a Nellore-based detective whose life runs into danger when he starts investigating the case of a dead body abandoned near a railway track.

The film was released theatrically on 21 June 2019 and received critical acclaim from the critics, where it became a commercial success at the box office. The film won three awards at Zee Cine Awards Telugu. It was remade in Tamil as Agent Kannayiram (2022).

== Plot ==
Sai Srinivas Athreya is an eccentric and amateur detective in Nellore who operates a modest agency named the FBI (Fatima Bureau of Investigation) alongside his loyal assistant, Sneha. Though he mostly handles petty domestic cases, Athreya remains deeply traumatized by the sudden, unresolved death of his mother years prior. His mundane routine changes when his friend Sirish informs him about an unclaimed, unidentified female corpse found dumped near the railway tracks in Venkatachalam. Driven by curiosity, Athreya visits the site to investigate but is promptly arrested by Circle Inspector Gautham Krishna on suspicion of committing the murder.

While held in a temporary holding cell, Athreya encounters an inmate named Maruthi Rao, who tearfully claims that his daughter, Divya, was brutally raped and murdered after traveling to Ongole. Rao alleges that the local police falsely accused him of the crime to protect the real perpetrators. To help Athreya investigate, Rao provides three phone numbers belonging to individuals Divya contacted just before her death: Ajay, Harsha, and Vasudha. Once Athreya secures his release, he and Sneha track down the leads, discovering that Ajay and Harsha were indeed present in Ongole during the crime window, while Vasudha remains completely untraceable.

The mystery deepens when Athreya spots a young woman on the highway who perfectly matches Divya's description, yet she fails to recognize him or react to her name. Digging into the anomaly, Athreya discovers that the man in prison is a fraud named Gopalam, who has entirely fabricated his identity and the story of his daughter. Shortly after this discovery, both Ajay and Harsha are systematically executed by an unseen killer, and Athreya is meticulously framed for their murders. Although CCTV footage proving he was locked in a sub-jail at the time of the killings secures him conditional bail, the court grants him a strict five-day window to conclusively prove his innocence. Concurrently, a missing person report filed for a girl named Vasudha leads the police to assume she has also fallen victim to the killer.

During his frantic hunt for answers, Athreya is ambushed by Bobby, another amateur detective who has been manipulated by false evidence into believing Athreya is a serial killer. After clearing the misunderstanding, the two detectives join forces and uncover a massive, overlapping pattern of unidentified bodies dumped along specific railway corridors between Kakinada and Tada. Athreya mathematically deduces that the corpses are being systematically transported on a specific cargo goods train route originating from Chennai and heading toward Delhi, dropped off at regular intervals, and subsequently cremated by unsuspecting railway authorities as unclaimed property.

To evade the corporate entities monitoring him, Athreya fakes his own death and travels covertly to Arambakkam in Tamil Nadu with the support of Sneha, Bobby, and Sub-Inspector Vamsi. The team ambushes and captures Gopalam, who breaks down and confesses to being a minor cog in a massive, lucrative syndicate. He reveals that his organization targets grieving, low-income Hindu families, offering to transport their deceased loved ones to Varanasi for sacred last rites free of charge. Instead, the syndicate pockets the administrative fees, dumps the bodies along the tracks, and harvests the fingerprints of the corpses to bypass biometric security systems, execute fraudulent banking transactions, and commit identity theft. Athreya is horrified to realize this exact scam was perpetrated on his own mother's body.

Pivoting back to the initial leads, Athreya discovers that the missing trio—Ajay, Harsha, and Vasudha—were actually brilliant criminology students researching deep-seated religious scams across India. Connecting the final pieces of forensic evidence, Athreya deduces that Vasudha is not a victim, but the ruthless criminal mastermind who orchestrated the entire corporate syndicate. When her classmates Ajay and Harsha began uncovering her illicit operation, she executed them to safeguard her secret and attempted to use Athreya as the perfect scapegoat.

Athreya successfully tracks a fleeing Vasudha to the remote Karni Mata Temple in Rajasthan. He corners her, coordinates a precision sting with local authorities, and has both Vasudha and her complicit father arrested and extradited back to Nellore to face trial. After parting ways with Bobby, Athreya and Sneha visit a local crematorium to pay their final, proper respects to the unidentified victims. With his mother's memory finally vindicated, Athreya returns to his small Nellore office alongside Sneha, ready to take on their next set of clients.

== Cast ==
- Naveen Polishetty as Agent Sai Srinivasa Athreya
- Shruti Sharma as Sneha
- Shredha Rajagopalan as Vasudha
- Appaji Ambarisha Darbha as Vasudha's father
- Suhas as Agent Bala Venkata Subramanya Swamy a.k.a. "Bobby"
- Ram Dutt as Sub-Inspector Vamsi
- Krishneswara Rao as Gopalam/Maruthi Rao
- Viswanath Mandalika as CI Gautham Krishna
- Prashant Yarramilli as Sirish
- Kranthi Priyam as PWD officer
- Suri K. Chaplin
- Lavanya as Ajay's wife
- Mahija as Harsha's wife
- Sandeep Raj as Ajay
- Vinu Varma as Harsha

== Production ==
I started writing the script in 2016 and it took close to 1 month to finish one line order of the film. Once completed, I took a month break to watch movies of a similar genre. I watched close to 50 best movies in that genre and started to analyze the flow of these kinds of movies. I mean how they begin, how a conflict is created and how do they end. Those movies helped alot [sic] to understand how to write the screenplay for my movie.

— Swaroop RSJ

The lead actor Naveen Polishetty explained that when he was looking for some good scripts, the director Swaroop contacted him on Facebook and told him the film's title and about the protagonist. When he narrated the whole story, Polishetty agreed to do the film if they got to work together on the final version. Swaroop agreed and they met in Hyderabad, where Polishetty's 4 years of experience as a writer helped him and they together worked on the script for eight months.

The soundtrack was composed by Mark K Robin and the cinematography was handled by Sunny Kurapati. The film was produced by the Malli Raava-fame Rahul Yadav Nakka.

== Soundtrack ==
The film's only song is "Sherlock Holmes", composed by Mark K Robin. It has two versions: one sung by Anurag Kulkarni, and another by Harika Narayan.

== Release ==
The film was released theatrically on 21 June 2019.

=== Critical reception ===
Agent Sai Srinivasa Athreya received critical acclaim from the critics and audience.

Film Companion's Karthik Keramulu called it the best comedy thriller of the decade. Times of India critic Neehitha Nyayapati gave it 4 stars out of 5, praising Polishetty's performance and the execution. A reviewer from The Hans India gave the film 4 stars out of 5, praising the performances, music and screenplay while criticising the slow-paced narration in the first half. A Deccan Chronicle critic similarly gave it 4 stars out of 5, calling it a "Telugu Sherlock Holmes" while praising the performances, background score and the cinematography. Krishna Sripada of The News Minute gave it 4 stars out of 5, and calling it a "textbook crime drama", praised the plot and cinematography but criticised some dubbing mismatches, Sharma's "undermined" character in the second half and editing towards the end.

The film also received appreciation from several Telugu film celebrities like director K. Raghavendra Rao and actors Allu Arjun and Varun Tej.

=== Box office ===
Agent Sai Srinivasa Athreya performed well in India and USA and was declared a super hit for this modest budget of ₹1 crore. The film was given a limited theatrical release and due to strong word of mouth in its full run the film grossed over ₹20 crore globally.

=== Home media ===
The film's digital rights were sold to Amazon Prime Video.

== Awards and nominations ==
Award	Date of ceremony	Category	Recipient(s) and nominee(s)	Result	Ref.
Critics Choice Film Awards	28 March 2020	Best Film	Agent Sai Srinivasa Athreya	Nominated	
Critics Choice Film Awards	28 March 2020	Best Director	Swaroop	Nominated	
Critics Choice Film Awards	28 March 2020	Best Writing	Swaroop, Naveen Polishetty	Nominated	
Sakshi Excellence Awards	17 September 2021	Best Debut Director	Swaroop	Won	
SIIMA Awards	18 September 2021	Best Actor – Telugu	Naveen Polishetty	Nominated	
SIIMA Awards	18 September 2021	Best Debut Director – Telugu	Swaroop RSJ	Won	
Zee Cine Awards Telugu	11 January 2020	Best Film – Special mention	Agent Sai Srinivasa Athreya	Won	
Zee Cine Awards Telugu	11 January 2020	Best Debut director	Swaroop	Won	
Zee Cine Awards Telugu	11 January 2020	Best Find of the year	Naveen Polishetty	Won	
Zee Cine Awards Telugu	11 January 2020	Best Screenplay	Swaroop, Naveen Polishetty	Nominated	

== Sequel and remakes ==
Following the film's success, the makers announced the film's extension into a trilogy. The film was remade in Tamil as Agent Kannayiram, and a Malayalam remake is in development.
