= Tanu Khan =

Indian television actress

- Occupation: Actress
- Known for: Chandra Nandini

Tanu Khan is an Indian television actress. She is best known for her portrayal of Empress Helena Maurya in Chandra Nandini and Mishika Singhania in Yeh Hai Chahatein.

== Career ==
She was in Chandra Nandini as Empress Helena Maurya with Shweta Basu Prasad. In 2019, she began playing the role of Mishka Singhania in Yeh Hai Chahatein.

== Filmography ==
=== Television ===
Year	Show	Role	Notes	Ref.
2013	MTV Roadies 10	Contestant		
2015–2016	Yeh Kahan Aa Gaye Hum	Nisha Sabharwal		
2016–2017	Chandra Nandini	Empress Helena Maurya		
2018	CID	Rupali	Episode 1500	
2018–2019	Musakaan	Kajal Bisht		
2019–2021	Yeh Hai Chahatein	Mishika Singhania		
2023	Naagin 6	Rihanna		
2025	Zyada Mat Udd	Anu Arora Ahluwalia		
2026	Divya Prem - Pyaar aur Rahasya Ki Kahaani	Maya Jaduwala		

=== Web series ===
Year	Title	Role	Platform	Notes
2025	Rishqiyaan: Dil, Dosti aur Dhokha	Kajal	Pocket TV	Microdrama
