= Babloo =

2011 Telugu language film

- Directed by: G. Ravicharan Reddy
- Produced by: Smt. Gudur Jhansirani
- Starring: Manotej; Aditi Sharma
- Music by: Chakri
- Production company: SPJ Creations
- Release date: 3 June 2011
- Country: India
- Language: Telugu

Babloo is a 2011 Indian Telugu romantic action film released in 2011 directed by G. Ravicharan Reddy. It was produced by Smt. Gudur Jhansirani under SPJ Creations banner. Manotej and Aditi Sharma appeared in lead roles. This film is dubbed into Hindi as Ek Aur Hero: The Dashing.

== Plot ==
Bablu is a story of young boy Babloo (Manotej), who is a happy-go-lucky guy studying in college, where he falls in love with Aditi Sharma, and after some instance their family gets some problems and rest of the story deals with how Babloo rescues their family problems with the help of Aditi Sharma.

== Cast ==
- Manotej as Babloo
- Aditi Sharma as Pooja
- Mukul Dev as Gaja
- Ahuti Prasad
- Chalapathi Rao
- Rao Ramesh
- Raghu Babu
- Kondavalasa
- Venu Madhav
- M. S. Narayana
- Geetha Singh
- Surekha Vani
- Satya Krishnan

== Production ==
This film was Aditi Sharma's last Telugu film as she felt it difficult to memorize Telugu lines without knowing the language. The film was shot in Hyderabad and Rajahmundry. The climax was shot near Himayat Sagar. As of September of 2009, most of the film was complete except for a song and patchwork.

== Soundtrack ==
The music was composed by Chakri. K. Raghavendra Rao, B. Gopal, Paruchuri Gopala Krishna, Bellamkonda Suresh and Taapsee Pannu attended the film's audio release function.
