= Abrar Qazi =

Indian television actor (born 1992)

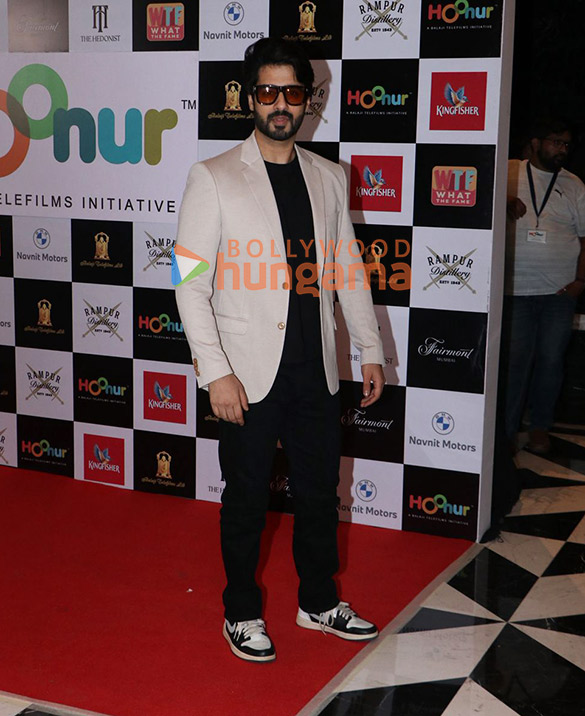
- Qazi in 2025
- Born: 3 August 1992 (age 34); Srinagar, Jammu and Kashmir, India
- Occupation: Actor
- Years active: 2018–present
- Known for: Gathbandhan; Yeh Hai Chahatein; Kumkum Bhagya; Kabhi Neem Neem Kabhi Shahad Shahad

Abrar Qazi (born 3 August 1992) is an Indian television actor. He is best known for portraying Raghu Jadhav in Gathbandhan, Rudraksh Khurana and Samrat Chaudhary in Yeh Hai Chahatein, Rajvansh Malhotra in Kumkum Bhagya and Udayveer Jindal in Kabhi Neem Neem Kabhi Shahad Shahad.

== Early life ==
Abrar Qazi was born on 3 August 1992 in Srinagar, Jammu & Kashmir, India. He completed his schooling from Tyndale Biscoe School, Srinagar. Qazi graduated with a Bachelor in Business Administration degree from Islamia College of Science and Commerce, Srinagar and also holds a degree in Master of Arts in Journalism.

Abrar Qazi in his early days used to make films based on social issues with the help of his friends. During college days he would often copy the style of Shahrukh Khan and his classmates would call him by that name. He also worked as a Graphic Designer in a private company in his hometown but left the job in very less time to pursue his dream of becoming an actor.

== Career ==
Qazi made his film debut in 2018 with the role of Zaid in Laila Majnu, written by Imtiaz Ali and directed by Sajid Ali. In 2019, he appeared in the Amazon Prime Video spy thriller The Family Man as Kareem Bhat.

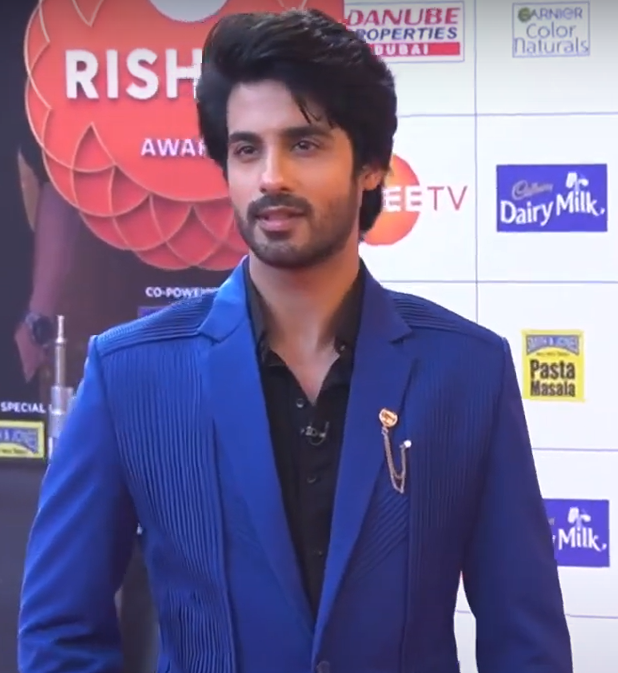
Qazi in Zee Rishtey Awards 2024

In January 2019, Qazi made his television debut in Gathbandhan on Colors TV, playing Raghu Jadhav, a gangster from Dombivli who falls in love with a police officer, played by Shruti Sharma. Following the show's end in November 2019, he was cast as rockstar Rudraksh Khurana in Yeh Hai Chahatein on StarPlus, opposite Sargun Kaur Luthra. He later portrayed Samrat Chaudhary in the same series until 2023. Show proved to be a turning point in his career, his performance and on-screen chemistry with Luthra were well-received, contributing to the show's popularity. In addition to television, he featured with Luthra in several advertisements between 2021 and 2022, including campaigns for Jeevansathi.com and Bru coffee.

In October 2023, Qazi joined Zee TV's Kumkum Bhagya following a 20-year narrative leap, portraying Rajvansh "RV" Malhotra opposite Rachi Sharma. He remained with the series until early 2025. In June 2025, Qazi began portraying Udayveer "UV" Jindal in Kabhi Neem Neem Kabhi Shahad Shahad on StarPlus, opposite Afia Tayebali. The series is a Hindi adaptation of the Bengali drama Kothha and is produced by Prosenjit Chatterjee. The show ended in September 2025 following low TRPs.

Since June 2026, he is playing Sanjay in Zee TV's Tu Hi Re Dil Mein.

== Filmography ==
=== Films ===
Year	Title	Role	Ref
2018	Laila Majnu	Zaid	

=== Television ===
Year	Title	Role	Notes	Ref
2019	Gathbandhan	Raghu Jadhav	Lead Role	
2019–2022	Yeh Hai Chahatein	Rudraksh "Rudra" Khurana	Lead Role	
2022–2023	Yeh Hai Chahatein	Samrat "Sam" Chaudhary	Lead Role	
2021	Yeh Hai Chahatein	Bhuvan Garg	Cameo Role	
2022	Ravivaar With Star Parivaar	Contestant		
2023–2025	Kumkum Bhagya	Rajvansh "RV" Malhotra	Lead Role	
2025	Kabhi Neem Neem Kabhi Shahad Shahad	Udayveer "UV" Jindal	Lead Role	
2026-present	Tu Hi Re Dil Mein	Sanjay Patel	Lead Role	

=== Web series ===
Year	Title	Role	Ref.
2019	The Family Man	Kareem Bhat	

== Awards and nominations ==
Year	Award	Category	Show	Result	Ref.
2019	Gold Awards	Best Debut Male	Gathbandhan	Nominated	
2019	Indian Telly Awards	Fresh New Face – Male	Gathbandhan	Nominated	
2022	Indian Television Academy Awards	Best Actor Male	Yeh Hai Chahatein	Nominated	
2025	Indian Telly Awards	Fan Favorite Star - Zee TV	Kumkum Bhagya	Nominated	
2025	Indian Telly Awards	Fan Favorite Jodi (with Rachi Sharma)	Kumkum Bhagya	Nominated	
