= Mehul Kajaria =

Indian television actor (born 1977)

- Born: 28 January 1977 (age 49)
- Occupation: Television actor
- Years active: 2001–present
- Known for: Kyunki Saas Bhi Kabhi Bahu Thi; Kumkum Bhagya; Doree

Mehul Kajaria (born 28 January 1977) is an Indian television actor.

== Television ==
Year	Serial	Role	Channel	Notes	Ref.
2001–2002	Kohi Apna Sa	Nachiket	Zee TV	Supporting Role	
2002–2003	Kehta Hai Dil	Kunal Singh	Star Plus	Supporting Role	
2002–2006	Kyunki Saas Bhi Kabhi Bahu Thi	Harsh Bhasin / Harsh Virani	Star Plus	Supporting Role	
2005	Raat Hone Ko Hai – Lift: Part 1 to Part 4	Episode 213 to Episode 216	Sahara One	Episodic Role	
2007	Teen Bahuraaniyaan	Rohit Gheewala	Zee TV	Lead Role	
2008	Babul Ka Aangann Chootey Na	Vinay Joshi	Sony Entertainment Television	Supporting Role	
2008	Naaginn	Vishesh	Zee TV	Cameo Role	
2009–2010	Jeet Jayenge Hum	Mannu	Sony Entertainment Television	Negative Role	
2013–2014	Saraswatichandra	Gyanchatur Desai	Star Plus	Supporting Role	
2014	Crime Patrol	Episode dated 1 February 2014	Sony Entertainment Television	Episodic Role	
2014	Adaalat	Advocate Ramesh Menon	Sony Entertainment Television	Supporting Role	
2015	Doli Armaano Ki	Sundar Sinha	Zee TV	Negative Role	
2016	Bhakton Ki Bhakti Mein Shakti	Anil (Episode 24)	Life OK	Episodic Role	
2018	Zindagi Ke Crossroads		Sony Entertainment Television	Episodic Role	
2019–2021	Kumkum Bhagya	Vikram Kohli	Zee TV	Supporting Role	
2021–2022	Wagle Ki Duniya – Nayi Peedhi Naye Kissey	Rajneesh Wadhwa	Sony SAB	Cameo Role	
2022	Ishq Ki Dastaan – Naagmani		Dangal	Supporting Role	
2022	Shubh Shagun	Dr. Ajay Khurana	Dangal	Negative Role	
2023	Na Umra Ki Seema Ho	Kaushik Pandey	Star Bharat	Supporting Role	
2023–2024	Doree	Yash Thakur	Colors TV	Supporting Role	
2024	Pushpa Impossible	Dr. Jay Kamat	Sony SAB	Cameo Role	
2025	Kabhi Neem Neem Kabhi Shahad Shahad	Harshvardhan Jindal	Star Plus	Supporting Role	
