= Kabhi Neem Neem Kabhi Shahad Shahad =

Indian drama television series

- Genre: Drama
- Created by: Prosenjit Chatterjee
- Based on: Kothha
- Starring: Afia Tayebali; Abrar Qazi; Sheetal Maulik; Mehul Kajaria; Sejal Jaiswal
- Country of origin: India
- Original language: Hindi
- No. of seasons: 1
- No. of episodes: 106

Production
- Camera setup: Multi-camera
- Running time: 20-30 minutes
- Production company: Nideas Creations

Original release
- Network: StarPlus
- Release: 6 June – 22 September 2025

Kabhi Neem Neem Kabhi Shahad Shahad (transl. Sometimes Neem, Sometimes Honey), also known by the initialism KNNKSS is an Indian Hindi-language television drama series that aired from 6 June 2025 to 22 September 2025 on StarPlus and streams digitally on JioHotstar. Produced by Prosenjit Chatterjee under Nideas Creations and stars Afia Tayebali and Abrar Qazi. It is the official Hindi adaptation of Star Jalsha's series Kothha. It was replaced by Ishani in its timeslot.

== Premise ==
Katha Kumari Rathi, a botanist, nurturing her plants with quiet dedication. When the topic of love and marriage comes up, she firmly states that she does not believe in it, she does not want to experience what her mother went through. A photo of her late mother on the wall adds emotional weight to her words.

On the other side, we meet Udayveer Jindal, a handsome, effortlessly charming chef who appears to run a cozy café. When Uday and Katha's paths cross, sparks fly and not in the romantic way. A heated argument follows and Uday vows revenge. The trigger? Possibly a remark Katha makes about his mother.

== Plot ==
Katha Kumari Rathi is a gentle, grounded botanist who finds joy in nurturing plants and living a life of simplicity and discipline. She resides with her Uncle Mohan and Aunt, holding tightly to her traditional values. In contrast, Udayveer "UV" Jindal is a charismatic celebrity chef who runs a lively cafe on Katha's college campus. Though he belongs to a large joint family, UV has a negative relationship with all of them, except for his cousins and UV's uncle, Shlok. Haunted by the unresolved trauma of his mother, Sheetal's unexplained departure from the Jindal house during his childhood, UV quietly searches for answers about her whereabouts.

Their worlds collide on Fresher's Day, when UV and his cousins disrupt Katha's meticulously planned, traditional ceremony with spontaneous dance and music. Katha, who values order and rituals, is deeply irked. Coincidentally, the Gangaur Pooja takes place on the same day. UV, entrusted by his grandfather, Eeshwar Jindal with bringing a sacred plant for the pooja, forgets his duty. Katha steps in, arriving at the Jindal house with Mohan and saving the day. She further impresses the elders by singing hymns live when others suggest using recorded music, earning admiration from Eeshwar and the family elders, much to UV and his cousins' irritation.

The tension escalates during the pooja when Katha respectfully complains to Eeshwar about how the food served strays from traditional customs. This deepens the existing rift between Eeshwar and UV, who now feels humiliated. Wounded in pride, UV vows to teach Katha a lesson by charming her into falling for him. Meanwhile, a storm brews at home when Naina, Mohan's daughter who had once eloped on her wedding day, unexpectedly returns. Her parents receive her with cold detachment, still hurt by her past choices.

But Katha embraces her cousin with warmth and compassion, urging her uncle and aunt to give Naina time and space, advising them not to question her until she is ready to speak. Affected by the humiliation caused by Katha, UV decides to trap Katha in his love to teach her a lesson. Katha slowly starts developing a crush towards UV. Katha overhears UV talking to his cousins about his plan and how he is succeeding.

Heartbroken, Katha roots herself in her belief of men are not trustworthy. Katha's friend Prerna almost gets abducted in a party organized by UV's friend, Tammy. UV helps Katha save Prerna before she goes missing but she comes to the conclusion that UV organized the kidnapping to arrive as a savior still as a part of his plan. Katha decides that she needs to close UV's cafe in their college, citing the kidnapping of Prerna. After a commotion at the campus, UV gets arrested and Katha withdraws the complaint but UV's cafe still remains closed.

== Cast ==
=== Main ===
- Afia Tayebali as Katha Kumari Jindal: Udayveer's estranged wife (2025)
- Abrar Qazi as Udayveer "UV" Jindal: Harshwardhan and Sheetal's son; Eeshwar's estranged grandson; Ash, Omi, Pari and Pratty's cousin; Katha's estranged husband (2025)

=== Recurring ===
- Amit Dolawat as Shlok Jindal: Eeshwar's estranged son; Harshwardhan's estranged brother; UV, Pratty, Pari, Omi and Ash's uncle (2025)
- Chandresh Singh as Mohan Rathi: Katha's maternal uncle (2025)
- Darshan Jariwala as Eeshwar Jindal: Harshwardhan and Shlok's father; UV, Pratty and Pari's estranged grandfather (2025)
- Gaurav Anand as Prithviraj "Pratty" Soni: Pari's brother, UV's cousin (2025)
- Khalida Jan/Sheetal Maulik as Ambika Jindal: Chandrakant's wife; Omkar and Ayushmati's mother (2025)
- Mehul Kajaria as Harshwardhan Jindal: Eeshwar's son; Shlok's estranged brother; Sheetal's estranged husband; UV's estranged father (2025)
- Meet Sadhwani as Omkar "Omi" Jindal: Ambika's son, Ash's brother, UV's cousin (2025)
- Shivendra Om Saainiyol as Arjun Mittal: A businessman and the co-owner of Maa Ka Anchal; Sheetal's estranged brother; Shikha's former love interest; UV's estranged uncle; the Jindals' enemy (2025)
- Shivi Bajpai as Ayushmati "Ash" Jindal: Ambika's daughter, UV's cousin (2025)
- Soumya Dilwal as Parineeta "Pari" Soni: UV's cousin (2025)
- Sejal Jaiswal as Naina Somani: Katha's cousin, Mohan's daughter, Tejas's wife (2025)
- Vidushi Dube as Tamanna "Tammy": UV's one-sided love interest (2025)
- Anindita Chatterjee as Sheetal Mittal Jindal/Gayatri Mittal: A businesswoman and the owner of Maa Ka Anchal; Arjun's estranged sister; Harshwardhan's estranged wife; UV's mother (2025)

== Production ==
=== Casting ===
Afia Tayebali was selected to play female lead, Katha. Abrar Qazi was chosen to play male lead, Udayveer Jindal.

=== Release ===
In April 2025, StarPlus unveiled a teaser introducing the new show titled Kabhi Neem Neem Kabhi Shahad Shahad, featuring Afia Tayebali and Abrar Qazi.
