= Agent Kannayiram =

2022 comedy mystery film

- Theatrical release poster
- Directed by: Manoj Beedha
- Screenplay by: Manoj Beedha; Ramesh Marabu
- Based on: Agent Sai Srinivasa Athreya by Swaroop RSJ
- Produced by: Manoj Beedha
- Starring: Santhanam; Riya Suman
- Cinematography: Theni Eswar; Saravanan Ramasamy
- Edited by: Ajay
- Music by: Yuvan Shankar Raja
- Production company: Labyrinth Films
- Release date: 25 November 2022
- Running time: 144 minutes
- Country: India
- Language: Tamil

Agent Kannayiram is a 2022 Indian Tamil-language comedy mystery film directed by Manoj Beedha and produced by Labyrinth Films. It is a remake of the 2019 Telugu film Agent Sai Srinivasa Athreya.The film stars Santhanam and Riya Suman with a supporting cast including Munishkanth, and Redin Kingsley. The film's music was composed by Yuvan Shankar Raja, with cinematography handled by duo Theni Eashwar and Saravanan Ramasamy and editing done by Ajay. The film was released in theatres on 25 November 2022 to mixed reviews from critics.

== Plot ==
Kannayiram, a self-proclaimed, unassuming private detective with a sleeplessness issue, grieving for his mother’s death, forcefully stays in his native village for the asset dispute of his family heirloom. Aadhirai, a documentary filmmaker who visits the village for her Project work meets Kannayiram for her interview. Aadhirai gives information about the increasing number of unidentified dead bodies found in and around Coimbatore region. Kannayiram takes up this case to prove his calibre. After solving the case, he finds out that doctor Karthikeyan along with his assistant Punniyam killed so many people and put the dead bodies near the bridge. Kannayiram beats Karthikeyan’s goons and takes him to the police where Karthikeyan is jailed for the rest of his life. Kannayiram gets an award and Aadhirai proposed to him in which he agrees. The film ends with Kannayiram solving another murder case

== Cast ==
- Santhanam as Kannayiram
- Riya Suman as Aadhirai (Voice dubbed by Ashmini Balakrishnan)
- Munishkanth as Kumarappan
- Redin Kingsley as Medical Shop Staff
- Pugazh as Maayaavi
- E. Ramdoss as Sub Inspector
- Guru Somasundaram as Kannayiram's father
- Indhumathi Manikandan
- Madhan Dhakshinamoorthy
- Aadhira
- Vanessa Cruez

== Production ==
Labyrinth Films signed on director Manoj Beedha (who earlier directed Vanjagar Ulagam) to direct the Tamil remake of 2019 Telugu film Agent Sai Srinivasa Athreya for their production house with Santhanam to portray the leading role. Riya Suman was cast as the female lead. Principal photography began on 1 February 2021 in Coimbatore with the majority of the portions shot in Coimbatore, Pollachi and Kerala. After 55 days of shoot, the film's final schedule was completed in October 2021. The title and the first look poster of the film were unveiled by director Lokesh Kanagaraj via his Twitter account on 15 October 2021. In January 2022, actors Arya and Jiiva released the teaser of the film on the occasion of Santhanam's birthday.

== Soundtrack ==
The music for the film is composed by Yuvan Shankar Raja, collaborating with Santhanam for the second time (after Dikkiloona) with Santhanam after the latter's transformation into lead roles.

Track listing
No.	Title	Lyrics	Singer(s)	Length
1.	"Oppari Rap"	MC Sanna, Kedakuzhi Maariyamma	Yuvan Shankar Raja, MC Sanna	3:26
2.	"Theme of Kannayiram" (Theme)	—	Instrumental	1:57
3.	"The Arabic Lullaby" (Theme)	—	Instrumental	2:27
Total length:				7:10

== Release ==
=== Theatrical ===
The film was scheduled to be released theatrically on 24 November 2022, but later pushed by a day to 25 November.

=== Home media ===
The post-theatrical streaming rights were acquired by Sun NXT.

== Reception ==
M. Suganth of The Times of India rated the film 2.5 out of 5 stars and wrote "Throughout the first half, the film seems indecisive on what it wants to be and the jagged editing only leads to what feels like disorienting narrative jumps." Kirubhakar Purushothaman of The Indian Express rated the film 2 out of 5 stars and wrote "Everything is unpronounced and lacks the impact the director has aimed for thus we are left with an underwhelming film that tries too hard. Not just the gun, even the film fails to fire." Srivatsan S of The Hindu wrote "Unfortunately Agent Kannayiram ends up being an exasperating watch lacking a soul, fittingly, for a film about dead bodies and lonely deaths." Vishal Menon of Film Companion wrote "You get a just-about-watchable comedy thriller that you start forgetting as you’re watching it." Soundarya Athimuthu of The Quint gave the film’s rating 3.5 out of 5 and wrote "The Tamil remake is a polished version of the original. A lot of effort has gone into cinematography, which is commendable."

Thinkal Menon of OTT Play gave the film 1.5 out of 5 stars and wrote "A Santhanam-starrer usually is loaded with minimum entertaining elements irrespective of its total outcome. But this time, he tests patience, thanks to his awful decision to remake an engaging movie." Yuva Nandini of ABP Live gave the film 4 out of 5 stars and wrote "Agent Kannayiram is sure to be one of the best in Santhanam's career." Avinash Ramachandran of Cinema Express wrote "Agent Kannayiram is a hyper-stylised version of Agent Sai Srinivasa Athreya but misses out on hitting the same highs as the original." Dinamalar rated the film 2 out of 5 stars.
