= Keshav Pandit (TV series) =

Indian crime drama show

- Genre: Drama; Crime
- Created by: Ekta Kapoor
- Written by: Ved Prakash Sharma
- Directed by: Santram Varma
- Starring: Sarwar Ahuja
- Country of origin: India
- Original language: Hindi
- No. of seasons: 1
- No. of episodes: 11

Production
- Producers: Ekta Kapoor; Shobha Kapoor
- Production location: India
- Camera setup: Multi-camera
- Running time: Approx. 45 minutes
- Production company: Balaji Telefilms

Original release
- Network: Zee TV
- Release: May 15 – July 24, 2010

Keshav Pandit is an Indian crime drama series that premiered on May 15, 2010 on Zee TV. The series revolves around the life of a fictional hero Keshav Pandit - originally created by Ved Prakash Sharma - and is produced by Ekta Kapoor and Shobha Kapoor under their banner Balaji Telefilms.

== Plot ==
The series revolves around Madhav Shastri who is punished at the age of 14 for a crime which he hasn't committed. At the age of 24, he emerges as Keshav Pandit who plans to help the innocent trapped in the vicious circle of the law as he doesn't want anyone else to face the hardships he has gone through.

== Cast ==
- Sarwar Ahuja as Keshav Pandit/Madhav Shastri
- Khushalli Das as Keshav's mother
- Rajat Tokas as young Madhav Shastri
- Aman Verma
- Gungun Uprari
- Neetha Shetty
- Panchi Bora as Sonu Juneja
- Aanchal Munjal
- Via Roy Choudhury as Saira Khan
- Zubin Dutt as Mangal
