= Shayad Yahi Hai Pyaar =

Indian romantic television series

- Genre: Romantic Comedy; Drama
- Based on: Something in the Rain by Kim Eun
- Developed by: Kim Eun
- Written by: Dialogue: Rajesh Chawla
- Screenplay by: Jaya Misra; Bradley Fernandes
- Story by: Dilip Jha; Akash Virmani
- Directed by: Vikram Labhe; Uday Berry
- Creative directors: Pankhuri Rodrigues; Neil Gocher; Sweta Piprodia
- Starring: Aditi Sharma; Daksh Puri
- Theme music composer: Sid Paul
- Opening theme: "Shayad Yahi Hai Pyaar" by Sid Paul, Akanksha Sethi & Raasif Zojwalla; Lyrics: Rahul Yadav
- Composer: Animesh Panigrahi
- Country of origin: India
- Original language: Hindi
- No. of seasons: 1
- No. of episodes: 42

Production
- Executive producers: Pratik Redij; Vishal Bajaj; Saket Kunde; Janaki Amrite; Sam Gogate; Kaumudi Mahajan; Ishita Jain; Varsha Sinha; Charles Park (SLL)
- Producers: Aditi Shrivastava; Vinay Pillai; Anirudh Pandita; Ashwin Suresh
- Production location: Delhi
- Cinematography: Mangesh Mahadik
- Editors: Amit Singh; Ganga Kacharla; Online editor Rajat Ramashish Sharma
- Camera setup: Multi-camera
- Running time: 20 minutes
- Production companies: Dice Media/Pocket Aces Pictures; JTBC Studios

Original release
- Network: Colors TV
- Release: 28 September 2026 – present

Shayad Yahi Hai Pyaar (transl. Perhaps This Is Love) is an Indian Hindi-language romantic comedy drama television series airing on Colors TV from 28 September 2026 and streams digitally on JioHotstar. An official adaptation of the K-drama, Something In The Rain, it is jointly produced by Dice Media and JTBC Studios and stars Aditi Dev Sharma and Daksh Puri.

== Plot ==
Preeti Arora, a 35-year-old working woman in Delhi who faces workplace challenges while also dealing with constant questions about why she is still unmarried.

Preeti had been in a five-year relationship with Gaurav Gulati, 37, a man who appears to tick all the conventional boxes. However, his betrayal leaves her questioning the choices she had made and the life she believed she wanted.

At her lowest point, Preeti crosses paths with Aarav Ahuja, a 25-year-old game developer who returns to Delhi after studying in the US. Aarav is also Preeti’s former childhood admirer and happens to be her best friend's brother. What begins as an unlikely friendship gradually develops into a relationship that challenges the rules Preeti has been taught to follow.

Aarav sees Preeti beyond society’s checklist and helps her feel seen, safe and happy, allowing her to rediscover herself after years of pressure and expectations. As Preeti navigates workplace politics, parental expectations, societal judgement and the fear of starting over at 35, she is forced to confront the choice between a relationship that looks right and one that feels right.

== Cast ==
=== Main ===
- Aditi Dev Sharma as Preeti "Preeto" Arora: Deputy manager at Daily Delhi Cafe (DDC); Shanti and Vinod's daughter; Aarav's girlfriend (2026–present)
- Daksh Puri as Aarav Ahuja: Game developer at Gen A Games; Sandhya's younger brother; Preeti's boyfriend (2026–present)

=== Recurring ===
- Kunal Karan Kapoor as Gaurav Gulati: Preeti's ex-partner (2026-present)
- Aishwarya Sakhuja as Sandhya "Sandy" Ahuja: Aarav's elder sister; Preeti's best friend (2026–present)
- Vishal Malhotra as Kapil: Sandhya's husband (2026–present)
- Jagat Rawat as Vinod Arora: Shanti's husband (2026–present)
- Grusha Kapoor as Shanti Arora: Vinod's wife (2026–present)
- Gautam Ahuja as Vaibhav Arora: Shanti and Vinod's son (2026–present)
- Harsh Vashisht as Rajat: Preeti and Kyra's boss (2026–present)
- Sarthak Sharma as Monty: Aarav's friend (2026–present)
- Kashish Mehra as Kyra: Preeti's friend (2026–present)
- Sarannya Sharma as Shanaya: Gaurav's love interest (2026–present)
- Bondhiya Dhamala as Gauri (2026–present)
- Namami Vashisht as Tina (2026–present)
- Niddhi Tiwari as Manju (2026–present)
- Poonam Jangra as Anju (2026–present)
- Sarwar Ahuja as Vikrant (2026)
- Mark Parakh as Himanshu (2026–present)
- Divyangana Jain
- Rishi Deshmukh

== Production ==
=== Development ===
In February 2022, it was confirmed that Something in the Rain is set for an Indian remake produced by popular media company Pocket Aces Pictures Pvt. Ltd. On 23rd May 2026, the title of the remake as Shayad Yahi Hai Pyaar was announced and is inspired from the song "Shayad Yahi To Pyar Hai" of the movie Lucky - No Time For Love. The series in co-produced by Dice Media (long-form content division of Pocket Aces) and JTBC Studios, which possess the IP rights of the show.

=== Casting ===
Newcomer Daksh Puri was cast as male lead, Aarav Ahuja making his television debut as a lead actor. Aditi Dev Sharma was signed to play the female lead, Preeti Arora. Aishwarya Sakhuja also entered the series as a parallel lead. Kunal Karan Kapoor was cast as Gaurav. In November 2026, the show had special real-life-meets-reel-life moment, Aditi's husband, Sarwar Ahuja made a cameo appearance in the show.

=== Release ===
The first promo featuring the leads was released on May 2026. The series was supposed to launch in June and postponed due to TRP blackout. The show premiered on 28 September 2026 replacing Juhi Mui at 9.30 p.m. slot.
