= Sarwar Ahuja =

Indian actor (born 1980)

- Born: 10 July 1980 (age 46); Hyderabad, Andhra Pradesh, India (present-day Telangana, India)
- Occupation: Actor
- Years active: 2004–present
- Known for: Jyoti; Keshav Pandit; Punar Vivaah – Zindagi Milegi Dobara; SuperCops Vs Super Villains
- Spouse: Aditi Sharma (m. 2014)
- Children: 2

Sarwar Ahuja (born 10 July 1980) is an Indian actor who primarily works in Hindi films and television. He is a winner of India's Best Cinestars Ki Khoj (2007). Following his appearance as a participant in the show, he later made his acting debut with the film Khanna & Iyer (2007). Ahuja is best known for his portrayal of Pankaj Vashisht in Jyoti, Keshav Pandit in Keshav Pandit, Prashant Dubey in Punar Vivaah – Zindagi Milegi Dobara and Senior Inspector Shaurya in SuperCops Vs Super Villains.

== Life and family ==
Ahuja was born on 10 July 1980 in Hyderabad in a Punjabi-Hindu family.

Ahuja met actress Aditi Sharma in 2004, when they were contestants on the talent hunt reality show India's Best Cinestars Ki Khoj. Ahuja married Sharma in 2014, after 10 years of relationship. The couple welcomed their son, Sartaj in 2019 and their daughter in 2024.

== Career ==
Ahuja has worked on television, in programs such as Jyoti where he played the roles of Sachin and Pankaj. He played Inspector Shaurya in Hum Ne Li Hai... Shapath, a crime drama series set in Mumbai. He was the male winner of the first season of the talent show India's Best Cinestars Ki Khoj in 2004.

== Filmography ==
=== Films ===
- All films are in Hindi unless otherwise noted.

Year	Title	Role	Notes	Ref.
2007	Khanna & Iyer	Aryan P. Khanna		
2008	Hum Phirr Milein Na Milein	Rahul Ahuja		
2008	Meri Padosan	Shyamgopal Verma		
2009	Aisi Deewangi	Shekhar		
2011	Kuch Khatta Kuch Meetha	Unknown		
2011	Tum Hi To Ho	Rahul Sharma		
2014	Patiala Dreamz	Garry	Punjabi film	

=== Television ===
Year	Title	Role	Notes	Ref.
2004	India's Best Cinestars Ki Khoj	Contestant	Winner	
2009–2010	Jyoti	Pankaj Vashisht		
2010	Keshav Pandit	Keshav Pandit / Madhav Shastri		
2012–2013	Punar Vivaah – Zindagi Milegi Dobara	Prashant Dubey		
2012–2014	SuperCops Vs Super Villains	Senior Inspector Shaurya / RoboCop		
2012	Adaalat	Santosh		
2014	Yeh Hai Aashiqui	Danish		
2015–2016	Diya Aur Baati Hum	Satyadev Tripathi IPS		
2016	Gangaa	Advocate Palash Banerjee		
2018	Mere Papa Hero Hiralal	Hiralal Tiwari		
2022	Tera Yaar Hoon Main	Ravinder Bagga		
2022	Mose Chhal Kiye Jaaye	Advocate Goldie Seghal		
2023–2024	Vanshaj	Kabeer Oberoi		
2024–2025	Mangal Lakshmi	Advocate Raghuveer "Raghu" Dalal		
2025–2026	Himachal Se Olympic Tak Ka Safar	Kabir		
2026	Shayad Yahi Hai Pyaar	Vikrant		
