= Yeh Hai Chahatein =

Indian musical romantic television series

- Genre: Drama; Romance; Musical
- Created by: Ekta Kapoor
- Developed by: Ekta Kapoor
- Written by: Dialogue: Dheeraj Sarna
- Screenplay by: Shilpa Jathar
- Story by: Sonali Jaffar
- Directed by: Neeraj Baliyan; Rishi Tyagi; Khwaja Mughal; Vishwankar Pathania; Amar Varpe; Ranjan Kumar Singh; Vikas Rai; Aashiesh Paatil; Nitesh Mishra
- Creative directors: Shivangi Babbar; Dhruv G Umrania
- Starring: Sargun Kaur Luthra; Abrar Qazi; Shagun Sharma; Pravisht Mishra
- Theme music composer: Lalit Sen; Nawab Arzoo
- Opening theme: “Yeh Hai Chahatein” by Palak Muchhal and Siddharth Slathia
- Composer: Pamela Jain
- Country of origin: India
- Original language: Hindi
- No. of seasons: 3
- No. of episodes: 1,485

Production
- Executive producers: Nilesh Mishra; Shailesh Sharma; Ranjan Jena
- Producers: Ekta Kapoor; Shobha Kapoor
- Cinematography: Maneesh Malik; Ashish Sharma; Avinash Mahagaavkar
- Editors: Vikas Sharma; Vishal Sharma; Manas Majumdar
- Camera setup: Multi-camera
- Running time: 22–24 minutes
- Production company: Balaji Telefilms

Original release
- Network: Star Plus
- Release: 19 December 2019 – 18 September 2024

Related
- Yeh Hai Mohabbatein

Yeh Hai Chahatein (transl. This Is Desire) is an Indian Hindi-language musical romantic drama television series produced by Ekta Kapoor for Star Plus. It streams on Disney+ Hotstar and is a spin-off of Yeh Hai Mohabbatein. The show aired from 19 December 2019 to 18 September 2024. One of the longest running Indian television soap opera, the series starred Sargun Kaur Luthra, Abrar Qazi, Shagun Sharma and Pravisht Mishra as the leads over two generations.

== Plot ==
A passionate love story unfolds between a famous rock star, Rudraksh Khurana, and a gynaecologist, Dr. Preesha Srinivasan, who fall in love after raising their respective siblings' son together. They die promising one another that they will always remain soulmates and reunite in every lifetime.

Twenty years later, destiny brings together a reserved physiotherapist, Dr. Nayantara, and a famous rock star, Samrat.

After another twenty years, destiny offers Nayantara and Samrat a second chance at love. Their daughter, Kaashvi, is in love with her childhood friend Arjun, who in turn loves Mahima, leading to a complicated love triangle. Circumstances force Kaashvi to marry Arjun, and he eventually falls in love with her after realising the true meaning of love, but insecurities jeopardise their marriage.

== Cast ==
=== Main ===
- Sargun Kaur Luthra as
  - Dr. Preesha Khurana (née Srinivasan) (2019–2022)
  - Dr. Nayantara "Nayan" Choudhary (née Iyer) (2022–2023)
- Abrar Qazi as
  - Rudraksh "Rudra" Khurana (2019–2022)
  - Samrat "Sam" Choudhary (2022–2023)
  - Bhuvan Garg (2021)
- Shagun Sharma as IAS Kashvi "Kashu" Bajwa (née Sabharwal) (2023–2024)
- Pravisht Mishra as IAS Arjun Bajwa (2023–2024)

=== Recurring ===
- Raanav Sharma as Karun Bajwa (2023–2024)
- Muskaan Kataria as Mahima "Mahi" Thapur (née Sabharwal) (2023–2024)
- Shireen Mirza as Nitya Bajwa (2023–2024)
- Dipali Sharma as Meera Bakshi (2024)
- Rohit Mehta / Ashu Sharma as IAS Jagdish Bajwa (2023)/(2023–2024)
- Radhika Chavan as Toshi Sabharwal (2023–2024)
- Ritu Vashisht as Romila Sabharwal (2023–2024)
- Shubh Karan as Pradyuman Thapur (2023–2024)
- Radhika Chhabra as Neelam Thapur (2024)
- Ronik Sharma as Micky Sabharwal (2023–2024)
- Saran Tiwari as Monty Sabharwal (2023–2024)
- Ajay Kumar Singh as Kewal Sabharwal (2023–2024)
- Aishana Singh as Isha Sabharwal (2024)
- Suraj Sonik as Mohan (2024) (Dead)
- Simran Gangwani as Sushma Arora (2024)
- Manas Shah as
  - IAS Aditya "Adi" Arora (2023–2024)
  - Aman Singh Arora / Nikhil Desai (2024)
- Shivanshi Das as Shanti (2024)
- Krutika Khira as Nisha (2024)
- Hitul Pujara as Suraj Khanna (2023)
- Viplove Sharma as Pankaj Khanna (2023)
- Aarati Kandpal as Aruna Bajwa Khanna (2023)
- V S Prince Ratann as
  - Biker (2023)
  - Ramesh: Lab assistant (2024)
- Ishika Makhija as Veera (2023)
- Anny Rana Bhatt (2023)
- Suneel Nagar as Police Commissioner (2023)
- Arpita Sethia as Raj's mother (2023)
- Gagan Mishra as Chief Minister (2023)
- Avinn Tyagi as Shivansh (2023)
- Krish Chugh as Saransh Khurana (2021–2022)
  - Vidhaan Sharma / Yagya Bhasin / Ali Dhuru as Child Saransh Khurana (2019–2020) / (2020–2021) / (2021)
- Swarna Pandey as Ruhi Khurana (2021–2022)
- Mallika Nayak as Sharda Khurana (2019–2022)
- Indira Krishnan as Vasudha Srinivasan (2019–2022)
- Vijay Kashyap / Gulshan Pandey as Gopal "GPS" Srinivasan (2019–2020)/(2020–2022)
- Siddharth Shivpuri as Advocate Yuvraj Pillai (2019–2022)
- Aishwarya Khare as Mahima Srinivasan (2019–2021)
- Prince Mahajan as Venkatesh "Venky" Srinivasan (2021)
- Krutika Desai as Advocate Vaijayanti Srinivasan (2021–2022)
- Nitin Bhatia as Bhairavnath "Bunty" Gupta (2019–2022)
- Jyoti Negi as Ankita "Bubble" Gupta (2019–2022)
- Anjali Mukhi as Sulochana Khurana (2019–2021)
- Satyajit Sharma as Balraj Khurana (2019–2021)
- Indraneil Sengupta as Rajeev Khurana (2019–2020)
- Aishwarya Sakhuja as Ahana Singhania Khurana (2019–2021)
- Tanu Khan as Mishka "Mish" Singhania (2019–2021)
- Altamash Faraz as Armaan Thakur (2021–2022)
- Puvika Gupta as Anvi Thakur (2021)
- Himani Sahani as Devika Thakur (2021)
- Sonal Vengurlekar as Sanya Dubash (2021)
- Karan Sharma as Digvijay Thakur (2021–2022)
- Unknown as Kanchan Thakur (2022)
- Pragati Chourasiya as Pihu Thakur (2022)
- Jeevansh Chadha as Vidyut Rohira (2022)
- Milind Manek as Raj Bansal (2022)
- Priyanka Choudhary as Keerti "Kittu" Jain (2020)
- Khatija Iqbal as Kaveri Dubey (2019–2020)
- Rupesh Kataria as Suryadhar "Surya" Raina (2019–2020)
- Mridula Oberoi as Inspector Sanchi Chautala (2021–2022)
- Bikramjeet Kanwarpal as Niketan Singhania (2020)
- Upen Chauhan as Rahul Arora: Neerja's husband (2020)
- Melanie Pais as Neerja Arora (2020)
- Shabaaz Abdullah Badi as Arjun Verma (2020)
- Trupti Mishra as Sonia Garg (2021)
- Khushank Arora as Kabir "Kabby" Khurana (2021)
- Saksham Vasu as Sunny Bhattacharya (2021)
- Ankur Verma as Param Aneja (2021)
- Preeti Chaudhary as Vanshikha Chaudhary (2022)
- Poorva Gokhale as Commissioner Revati Choudhary (2022–2023)
- Jayati Narula as Aliya Choudhary (2022–2023)
  - Maisha Dixit as Child Aliya Choudhary (2022)
- Yajuvendra Singh as Rakesh Choudhary (2022)
- Yash Acharya as Dev Choudhary (2022)
- Juhi Singh Bajwa as Nalini Sinha (2022)
- Pratichi Mishra as Malati Iyer (2022–2023)
- Syed Zafar Ali as Govind Iyer (2023)
- Anjali Ujawane as Shanti Iyer (2022–2023)
- Swati Sharma as Ishaani Iyer Shukla (2022–2023)
- Bharat Ahlawat as Mohit Shukla (2022–2023)
- Meera Sarang as Seema Shukla (2022–2023)
- Runav Shah as Chintu Iyer (2022–2023)
- Shaurya Vijayvargiya as Prem Khurana (2023)
- Akshita Vatsayan as Kiara (2022–2023)
- Ishita Ganguly as Manasi Khanna (2023)
- Kushagre Dua as Raghav Rathore (2023)
- Pratham Kunwar as Siddharth Rathore (2023)
- Jigruksha Chaudhary as Rucha (2024)

=== Guests ===
- Divyanka Tripathi as Dr. Ishita Bhalla from Yeh Hai Mohabbatein (2019)
- Karan Patel as Raman Bhalla from Yeh Hai Mohabbatein (2019)
- Abhishek Verma as Yug Sharma from Yeh Hai Mohabbatein
- Sunny Kaushal as Sunny to promote his film Shiddat (2021)
- Ashwini Kalsekar as Commissioner Deepali Handa from Rudra: The Edge of Darkness (2022)
- Swati Rajput as Diya Mathur from Yeh Jhuki Jhuki Si Nazar (2022)
- Neetha Shetty as Mayuri Ahuja (2022)

== Production ==
=== Development and premiere ===
In June 2017, producer Ekta Kapoor revealed her plan for a spin-off of Yeh Hai Mohabbatein however stated, "I wanted to make a spin off of Yeh Hai Mohabbatein but it's not working out with the story line." The reports of the spin-off in making was then announced in April 2018. It was supposed to premiere in the same year but was delayed as the story was not finalized. Then, it was reported to premiere in June 2019 and the casting for it was going on while Aakanksha Singh and Karan Vohra were reported as the leads. But it was scrapped in July 2019. In September 2019, the series was revived and fresh casting sessions began. Sargun Kaur Luthra was cast as Dr. Preesha Srinivasan and Abrar Qazi was cast as Rudraksh Khurana.

Talking about the series, producer Ekta Kapoor said "Yeh Hai Chahatein deals with another social issue. It's often said that it's easier for men with children to get married again, but very tough for a woman with a child to find a suitable groom."

=== Release ===
The first promo of the series was released on 27 November 2019 where Sargun Kaur Luthra and Vidhaan Sharma were introduced by Divyanka Tripathi and Karan Patel as Dr. Preesha Srinivasan and Saransh Khurana. The next promo was released on 16 December 2019 featuring Abrar Qazi, Luthra and Vidhaan Sharma. The series premiered on 19 December 2019 on StarPlus.

=== Casting ===
Sargun Kaur Luthra was selected to play Dr. Preesha Srinivasan's character. Karan Wahi was approached to play Rudraksh Khurana, but Abrar Qazi was signed by the production team. Zebby Singh was potentially going to play Yuvraj Pillai before the role went to Siddharth Shivpuri. Parul Chauhan was supposed to play Ahana, but Aishwarya Sakhuja replaced her. When the shooting resumed after the COVID-19 outbreak, in early July 2020, Vidhaan Sharma was replaced by Yagya Bhasin as Saaransh and Gulshan Pandey replaced Vijay Kashyap as Gopal.

Luthra stated that she took inspiration from Neena Gupta for her role. Talking about playing a mother for the first time, she said, "When I was told that I will be playing a mother, I wasn't apprehensive at all. My only worry was that i am very young and I had to look mature on the screen which was a challenge. The team has helped me a lot to help me look a certain age and moreover with my body language to portray this character. Even Vidhaan (my on-screen son), has helped bring out the best in me. More than mother-son, we are like friends off the screen."

Sakhuja was hired to portray Ahana, her first negative role. Speaking about it she said, "I have auditioned for a lot of Balaji shows and whenever I auditioned for negative roles I was told I look very positive. So, when I bagged this role, I asked them why now? They said eventually you will get to know as to why we have chosen you, and I understand because they like to surprise their audience and that's exactly what they are doing. I was figuring how to go about it, but my team is helping. After every two sentences out of habit, I go into the positive zone but I have people to handhold me and help me."

In May 2021 Mister Supranational India Altamash Faraz was cast as Armaan Thakur.

In December 2021, the show took a leap of 5 years, after Preesha claimed the death of Vicky and arrested.after the leap she gave birth to a spunky girl, Ruhi and raise her as a single mother whereas Ruhi plays as a matchmaker for Rudraksh and Preesha.

In December 2022, the narrative underwent its first 20-year leap, Dr Nayanthara and Rockstar Samrat, re-incarnation of Preesha and Rudraksh, again played by Luthra and Qazi respectively whereas Samrat is seen having a funky look with long hair, really doesn't care about the love from his fans. On the other hand, Nayantara is a loner, knows how to embrace the same with confidence, who is a dark skinned girl and has a mole on her face with a tight braid.

In July 2023, After the second 20-year leap implemented, Sargun Kaur Luthra and Abrar Qazi, who had portrayed the leads roles for two generations, eventually exited the series, making way for the new generation characters, Kashvi and Arjun portrayed by Shagun Sharma and Pravisht Mishra respectively.

In November 2023, the show again took a leap of 5 years, whereas a young boy is caught stealing from a store, prompting the security guard to consider reporting the incident to higher authorities. Kashvi intervenes, claiming the boy as hers. Kashvi takes the opportunity to educate the boy about the consequences of stealing and advises him against it. Later, as the boy spots his father, it is unveiled that Arjun is the father, leaving Kashvi visibly surprised as she turns to see him.

=== Filming ===
Set in Delhi, the series is mainly filmed in Film City, Mumbai. On 3 August 2020, heavy rains caused the shoot to be cancelled.

On 13 April 2021, Chief Minister Uddhav Thackeray announced a sudden curfew effective from 15 April. On 14 April, Ekta Kapoor and Balaji Telefilms decided to move all their shows' shooting to their sets at Goa.

=== Broadcast ===
The production and airing of the show was halted indefinitely in late March 2020 due to the COVID-19 outbreak in India. The series was expected to resume on 1 April 2020 but could not and the series was last broadcast on 24 March 2020 airing its remaining episodes. After three months, the filming of the series resumed on 27 June 2020 while the broadcast resumed on 13 July 2020.

== Reception ==
=== Ratings ===
Yeh Hai Chahatein maintained a consistent viewership profile on StarPlus, establishing a distinct audience footprint separate from its parent series, Yeh Hai Mohabbatein. The series premiered on December 19, 2019, with an initial TRP of 1.8. Over its first year of broadcasting, the show regularly placing within the top five most-watched Hindi daily fiction programs nationwide. Fans praised the on-screen chemistry between the leads Rudraksh (Abrar) and Pressha (Sargun), popularly called as "RuSha".

Viewership peaked between late 2021 and early 2022 during the narrative arc involving the central characters' memory loss and subsequent remarriage plots, reaching an all-time high weekly average of 3.1 TRP. During this phase, the program frequently ranked directly behind the network's top-rated soap operas, Anupamaa and Ghum Hai Kisikey Pyaar Meiin. To extend the run of the daily soap, a 20-year generation leap was introduced in late 2022. This narrative transition initially stabilized the show's ratings at a 2.2 TRP average. in February 2022, the series got a TRP of 2.7 at fifth place; in April, the show secured third position in BARC chart and in December, the show placed at fourth rank with 2.1 TVR. However, following the departure of the original lead actors, Abrar Qazi and Sargun Kaur Luthra in mid-2023, the series experienced gradual audience fatigue, with ratings dropping to a 1.4 TRP.

Subsequent timeline jumps and cast adjustments failed to reverse the downward trend. By mid-2024, the network shifted the series out of its primary prime-time lineup into a late-night 11:00 p.m. time slot, where it registered a low rating of 1.0. Due to the sustained decline in performance metrics, the network and production house concluded the show after a successful run of 5 years of 1400+ episodes.. The final episode broadcast in late 2024, registering a closing finale rating of 1.1 TRP.

Key TRP Milestones of Yeh Hai Chahatein
| Viewership Phase | TRP Rating | Context / Storyline Peak |
|---|---|---|
| Opening Episode | 1.8 | Premiere and introduction of Dr. Preesha and Rudraksh Khurana. |
| All-Time Peak (Weekly Average) | 3.1 | Memory loss subplots and central characters' remarriage arc. |
| Post-First Generation Leap (20 Years) | 2.2 | Introduction of next-generation characters Samrat and Nayantara. |
| Late-Stage Generational Shift | 1.4 | Storyline fatigue following the departure of the original lead actors. |
| All-Time Low | 1.0 | Plot saturation and reassignment to a late-night 11:00 PM time slot. |
| Closing Episode | 1.1 | Series finale concluding the multi-generational storyline. |

== Adaptations ==
| Language | Title | Original release | Network(s) | Last aired | Notes | Ref |
|---|---|---|---|---|---|---|
| Kannada | Mansella Neene ಮನೆಸಲ್ಲ ನೀನೆ | 20 December 2020 | Star Suvarna | 14 May 2023 | Remake | |
| Telugu | Madhura Nagarilo మధుర నగరిలో | 14 March 2023 | Star Maa | 29 June 2024 | Remake | |
| Hindi | Sairaab तृप्त | 2 June 2026 | Star Plus | 22 September 2026 | Inspired | |

== Television special ==
=== Ravivaar With Star Parivaar (2022) ===
The cast of Yeh Hai Chahatein went on to participate in Ravivaar With Star Parivaar, a musical competition wherein eight StarPlus shows competed against each other to win the title of "Best Parivaar". Yeh Hain Chahatein was eliminated at 8th position and was the first show to be eliminated.

== Awards and nominations ==
| Year | Award | Category | Recipient | Result | Ref |
|---|---|---|---|---|---|
| 2022 | Indian Television Academy Awards | Best Actor in Lead Role (Popular) | Abrar Qazi | Nominated | |
| 2022 | Indian Television Academy Awards | Best Actress in Lead Role (Popular) | Sargun Kaur Luthra | Nominated | |
| 2022 | Indian Television Academy Awards | Best Television Show - Fiction (Popular) | Ekta Kapoor | Nominated | |
| 2023 | Indian Telly Awards | Fan Favorite Show | Ekta Kapoor | Won | |
