= Maharani College =

Girls college in Jaipur, India

Coordinates: 26.9116°N 75.8154°E

University Maharani College, Jaipur
- Motto: "Educate a man and you educate one person; educate a woman and you educate a whole nation." ~ Mahatma Gandhi
- Type: Public
- Established: 1 August 1944
- Affiliation: University of Rajasthan
- Principal: Prof. Payal Lodha
- Location: Jaipur, Rajasthan, India
- Website: https://www.uniraj.ac.in/MaharaniCollege/

Maharani College is a girls college in the city of Jaipur, in the state of Rajasthan. The college was established in 1944 and is one of six constituent colleges of University of Rajasthan. It was established on the name of Maharani Gayatri Devi.
