= Naveen Polishetty =

Indian actor

- Born: 26 December 1989 (age 36); Hyderabad, Andhra Pradesh (present day Telangana), India
- Education: NIT Bhopal
- Occupations: Actor; screenwriter
- Years active: 2012–present

Naveen Polishetty (born 26 December 1989) is an Indian actor and screenwriter who primarily works in Telugu films. He made his silver screen acting debut with Life Is Beautiful and became lead actor with the film Agent Sai Srinivasa Athreya (2019). He then appeared in the coming-of-age blockbuster film Chhichhore (2019), which marked his Hindi debut. He subsequently played the protagonist in the comedy film Jathi Ratnalu (2021) and the romantic comedy Miss. Shetty Mr. Polishetty (2023).

== Early life ==
Naveen Polishetty was born on 26 December 1989 in Hyderabad, India. He graduated with a Bachelor of Civil Engineering degree from Maulana Azad National Institute of Technology (also known as NIT Bhopal).

Polishetty moved to England to work as an engineer. He then decided to return to India to pursue his dream of becoming an actor. He lived in Mumbai and took up part-time jobs to pursue a full-time career in acting, worked in theatre and performed in plays.

== Career ==
Polishetty started his career by performing in theater plays. He appeared in supporting roles in the Telugu films Life Is Beautiful, D for Dopidi and 1: Nenokkadine, from 2012 to 2014. He subsequently moved to Mumbai where he started collaborating to make YouTube videos. He played major roles in videos produced by AIB and Cheers!.

In 2019, Polishetty made his debut as a leading man in Telugu cinema with the comedy thriller film Agent Sai Srinivasa Athreya, which he co-wrote and played the lead. He made his Hindi cinema debut in Nitesh Tiwari's Chhichhore as Acid. Chhichhore grossed ₹150 crore globally and also earned him a Zee Cine Awards nomination for Best Actor in a comic role. He then starred in the 2021 comedy film Jathi Ratnalu. The film was commercially successful, with a gross collection of ₹70 crore, emerging as Polishetty's biggest success. He won the Best Actor award at the SIIMA Awards for his portrayal of Jogipet Srikanth. He appeared in the 2023 film Miss Shetty Mr Polishetty as a stand-up comedian alongside Anushka Shetty.

In 2026, Polishetty appeared in the comedy film Anaganaga Oka Raju, co-starring Meenakshi Chaudhary, which was a box office success.

== Filmography ==
Key
†	Denotes films that have not yet been released

All films are in Telugu unless otherwise noted.

=== Films ===
Year	Title	Role	Notes	Ref.
2012	Life Is Beautiful	Rakesh		
2013	D for Dopidi	Harish	credited as Naveen	
2014	1: Nenokkadine	Naveen	credited as Naveen	
2019	Agent Sai Srinivasa Athreya	Agent Sai Srinivasa Athreya	Debut as lead actor; also screenplay writer	
2019	Chhichhore	Himanshu "Acid" Deshmukh	Hindi film	
2021	Jathi Ratnalu	Jogipet Srikanth		
2023	Miss Shetty Mr Polishetty	Sidhu Polishetty		
2026	Anaganaga Oka Raju	Raju and Gouravapuram Goparaju	Also writer and playback singer	

=== Television ===
All shows are in Hindi unless otherwise noted.

Year	Title	Role	Notes
2015	AIB: Honest Indian Wedding	Pankaj	Web debut; 2 episodes
2015	Mastiii (See Taare Mastiii Pe)	Anchor / Host	
2016	Chinese Bhasad	Raghu	8 episodes
2016	AIB : The Demonetization Circus	Tea Vendor	
2016	24	Kush Sawant	10 episodes
2017	Fais pas ci, fais pas ça	Rushik Sanghvi	French TV series; 2 episodes
2017	AIB: Honest Engineering Campus Placements	Average Mishra	3 episodes
2017	Untag	Sumit Razdan	
2018	What's Your Status	Tej "TJ" Kiran	5 episodes
2024	Unstoppable	Himself	Guest on the sixth episode of fourth season with actress Sreeleela

== Awards and nominations ==
Year	Award	Category	Work	Result	Ref.
2020	Zee Cine Awards Telugu	Best Find (Male)	Agent Sai Srinivasa Athreya	Won	
2020	Zee Cine Awards Telugu	Best Screenplay	Agent Sai Srinivasa Athreya	Nominated	
2020	Critics' Choice Film Awards	Best Writing	Agent Sai Srinivasa Athreya	Nominated	
2021	SIIMA Awards	Best Actor – Telugu	Agent Sai Srinivasa Athreya	Nominated	
2022	SIIMA Awards	Best Actor – Telugu	Jathi Ratnalu	Nominated	
2022	SIIMA Awards	Critics Best Actor – Telugu	Jathi Ratnalu	Won	
2022	Filmfare Awards South	Best Actor – Telugu	Jathi Ratnalu	Nominated	
2024	Filmfare Awards South	Best Actor – Telugu	Miss Shetty Mr Polishetty	Nominated	
2024	Filmfare Awards South	Critics Best Actor – Telugu	Miss Shetty Mr Polishetty	Won	
