= Yeh Kahan Aa Gaye Hum =

Indian television series

- यह कहाँ आ गए हम
- Genre: Indian soap opera Drama; Supernatural
- Created by: Balaji Telefilms
- Written by: Koel Chaudhuri; Deepti Rawal; Dialogues; Aparna Nadig
- Directed by: Deepak Vithoba Chauhan; Ranjan Kumar Singh; Randeep Shantaram Mahadik
- Starring: Karan Kundra; Tanu Khan; Saanvi Talwar; Papiya Sengupta; Mansi Sharma; Shireen Mirza
- Country of origin: India
- Original language: Hindi
- No. of seasons: 1
- No. of episodes: 214

Production
- Producers: Ekta Kapoor; Shobha Kapoor
- Production locations: Mumbai, India
- Camera setup: Multi-camera
- Running time: Approx. 24 minutes
- Production company: Balaji Telefilms

Original release
- Network: &TV
- Release: 26 October 2015 – 24 August 2016

Yeh Kahan Aa Gaye Hum is an Indian Hindi language supernatural musical-drama television show that aired from 26 October 2015 to 24 August 2016 Monday to Friday at 9:30pm (IST) on &TV. The show is produced by Ekta Kapoor of Balaji Telefilms and starred Karan Kundra and Saanvi Talwar as the protagonists.

== Cast ==
=== Main ===
- Karan Kundra as Rahul Sabharwal, Manvi's husband; Raj and Gayatri's younger son; Sonali's stepson
- Saanvi Talwar as Manvi Rahul Sabharwal (née Chatterjee), Rahul's wife

=== Recurring ===
- Naveen Saini as Raj Sabharwal, Shaleen and Rahul's father; Gayatri and Sonali's husband
- Papiya Sengupta as Sonali Raj Sabharwal: Raj's second wife; Shaleen and Rahul's step-mother; Nikhil's mother; Gayatri's best-friend
- Ashish Mehrotra as Shaleen Sabharwal: Raj and Gayatri's elder son; Sonali's stepson; Nisha's husband
- Tanu Khan as Nisha Shaleen Sabharwal, Shaleen's wife
- Usha Rana as Mrs. Sabharwal (Dadi), Raj's mother, Shaleen & Rahul's grandmother
- Miraj Joshi as Nikhil Sabharwal: Raj and Sonali's son; Shaleen and Rahul's half-brother
- Kali Prasad Mukherjee as Upamanyu Chatterjee, Manvi and Harsh's father
- Deepali Kamath as Shilpa Upamanyu Chatterjee, Manvi and Harsh's mother
- Aly Goni as Kabir Raichand (Agni)
- Giriraj Kabra as Harsh Chatterjee
- Arun Singh Rana as Sujoy
- Mansi Sharma as Yamini
- Avdeep Sidhu as Yugant
- Shireen Mirza as Dr. Shireen
- Charu Mehra as Avanti Talwar
- Paridhi Sharma as Ambika
- Anjali Ujwane as Anamika Raichand, Kabir's aunt
- Priya Shinde as Malvika (Spirit)
- Phalguni Sharma as cameo
- Mahima Makwana as cameo
- Khushboo Shroff as Twinkle
- Kajal Pisal as Kamya
