= Manan Joshi =

Indian television actor

- Born: Mumbai, Maharashtra, India
- Education: BTech
- Alma mater: Shri Bhagubhai Mafatlal Polytechnic, Mumbai
- Occupations: Actor; model
- Years active: 2017–present
- Known for: Shubh Laabh - Aapkey Ghar Mein; Kabhi Kabhie Ittefaq Sey

Manan Joshi is an Indian television actor who is best known as Vaibhav Toshniwal in Shubh Laabh - Aapkey Ghar Mein and later as Dr. Anubhav Kulshresth in Kabhi Kabhie Ittefaq Sey.

== Early life ==
Manan Joshi is originally from Gujarat. Before pursuing his career in acting, Joshi studied engineering from Shri Bhagubhai Mafatlal Polytechnic, Mumbai, and completed his BTech in Mechanical Engineering. After engineering he participated in theatre and several workshops, and wrote dramas and musicals.

== Career ==
Joshi had never thought of becoming an actor until he was called by a casting agent after watching his garba performance, following which he featured in several advertisements. He made his television debut in 2017 as Shamsher in Star Bharat series Kaal Bhairav Rahasya. In 2019, he played Rocky Chaubey in Guddan Tumse Na Ho Payega.

Post 2019, he took a break for around a year and made his comeback with Sony Sab series Shubh Laabh - Aapkey Ghar Mein as Vaibhav Toshniwal. However, he quit the series to leave for London for the shooting of a Canadian film. In 2022, Joshi played Dr. Anubhav Kulshresth opposite Yesha Rughani in Kabhi Kabhie Ittefaq Sey.

== Filmography ==
=== Television ===
Year(s)	Title	Role	Notes
2017	Kaal Bhairav Rahasya	Shamsher / Sheru	
2019	Guddan Tumse Na Ho Payega	Rocky Chaubey	
2021	Shubh Laabh - Aapkey Ghar Mein	Vaibhav Toshniwal	
2022	Kabhi Kabhie Ittefaq Sey	Dr. Anubhav "Anu" Kulshresth	
2023	Swaraj	Raja Mahendra Pratap Singh	
2023–2025	Mann Atisundar	Divyam Bansal	
2025–2026	Mangal Lakshmi	Karan Kapoor	

== See also ==
- List of Indian actors
- List of Indian television actors
