= Jay Mehta (actor) =

Indian television series producer

- Born: India
- Occupations: Actor; Producer
- Years active: 1985–present
- Spouse: Kinnari Mehta
- Children: Aryan Mehta Arianna Mehta
- Parent: Pranlal V. Mehta (Father)
- Website: https://jayproduction.co.in

Jay Mehta is a former Indian actor, who primarily worked in Hindi films and an Indian television producer, who works in soap opera. He is the managing director and creative head of Jay Productions. He is the son of Hindi film producer late Pranlal V. Mehta.

== Career ==
Jay Mehta was launched by Priyadarshan in Muskurahat, produced by Pranlal Mehta, the remake of Malayalam blockbuster Kilukkam opposite Revathi, but the film was termed as a box office disaster. His second release Zid (1994 film), that had the musical score of O.P.Nayyar also became a box office failure. Due to certain reasons he stepped down from his acting career and started producing television serials.

During this, he has produced more than 25 TV serials.In 2020, he produced a cop based comedy show Maddam Sir. Currently, he is the producer of Doree serial on Colors TV.

== Filmography ==
=== As actor ===
- 1992 - Muskurahat
- 1994 - Zid
- 1994 - Betaaj Badshah
- 1995 - Policewala Gunda
- 1996 - Mafia
- 1997 - Jeeo Shaan Se

=== As producer ===
- 1988 - Woh Phir Aayegi
- 1990 - Jawani Zindabad
- 1991 - 100 Days
- 2000 - Tarkieb
- 2001 - Zara Suniye Toh (Celebrity Talk Show)
- 2003 - Vishwaas
- 2003–04 - Aandhi (TV Series)
- 2005–07 - Sinndoor Tere Naam Ka (TV Series)
- 2006–08 - Solhah Singaar (TV Series)
- 2007–08 - Ardhangini (TV Series)
- 2008–09 - Rahe Tera Aashirwaad (TV Series)
- 2009 - Kkaanch (TV Series)
- 2010 - Afia Megha Abhimanu Omar (associate producer)(TV Series)
- 2010–11 - Shorr
- 2010–12 - Bhagonwali-Baante Apni Taqdeer (TV Series)
- 2012–13 - Rab Se Sohna Isshq (TV Series)
- 2013–14 - Ekk Nayi Pehchaan (TV Series)
- 2014–15 - Bal Gopal (TV Series)
- 2015–16 - Secret Diaries (TV Series)
- 2017–18 - Jeet Gayi Toh Piya Morey (TV Series)
- 2017–19 - Jiji Maa (TV Series)
- 2019 - Gathbandhan (TV Series)
- 2020 - Indiawaali Maa (TV Series)
- 2020–23 - Maddam Sir (TV Series)
- 2021–22 - Shubh Laabh - Aapkey Ghar Mein (TV series)
- 2021–22 - Hari Mirch Lal Mirch - Ek Teekhi Ek Karari (TV series)
- 2022–23 - Bindiya Sarkar (TV Series)
- 2023–2025 - Doree (TV Series)
- 2024 - Mata Ki Mahima (TV Series)
