= Rooh =

- Created by: Abhimanyu Singh
- Creative director: Sampurn Anand
- Theme music composer: Vidyut Goswami
- Country of origin: India
- Original language: Hindi
- No. of episodes: 40

Production
- Executive producers: Shyam Gupta; Aditya Narain Singh
- Production locations: Parwani Studios; Basra Studios
- Running time: approx. 41 minutes
- Production company: Sphere Origins

Original release
- Network: Zee TV
- Release: 6 November 2004 – 6 August 2005

Rooh (English: Soul) is an Indian one hour horror supernatural thriller television series which was broadcast on Zee TV from 6 November 2004 to 6 August 2005. It used to air every Saturday at 8 P.M.

Each story has a different cast and crew. Shivam Nair, Anand Rai, Imtiaz Alam, Saurabh Sengupta, Sajit Warrier, Mohit Hussein, Mukul Abhyankar are some of the directors who contributed to the series. Producers include Ronnie Screwvala, Zarina Mehta, Deven Khote, Gautam Mazumdar, Devkumar Dutta, Aditya Singh, Sunjoy Waddhwa and many more.

== Plot ==
Each story focussed on a different aspect of paranormal activity such as black magic ghosts, zombies, phantoms, possessed objects, witches and wizards and sinister ghosts. It left viewers questioning about things around them.

== Cast ==
- Achint Kaur
- Lavina Tandon
- Disha Vakhani as Kajal Srivastava (Episode 19)
- Devanshi Zaveri
- Rohit Sachdeva
- Reenaa A Garre
- Priti Prakash
- Priyanka
- Rajesh Mishra
- Anupam Bhattacharya
- Namrata Thapa
- Divya Jagdale
- Eric Nanda
- Rocky Verma
- Vishnu Sharma
- Shahab Khan in (2 episodes)
- Karishma Tanna as Mamta (Episode 7)
- Vishal Singh as Ranjeet (Episode 7)
- Ami Trivedi as Priya (Episode 8)
- Amit Dolawat as Atul (Episode 8)
- Abhay Vakil as Mehul (Episode 8)
- Karuna Pandey as Swapna (Episode 8)
- Aashish Kaul
- Kavita Kaushik
- Moonmoon Banerjee as Sucheta (Episode 3) / Priya (Episode 29)
- Bhuvan Chopra as Ravi (Episode 3)
- Rushad Rana as Raj (Episode 29)
- Gunjan Walia
- Sharad Malhotra
- Tarun Khanna
- Sandeep Mohan
- Sonia Kapoor
- Sanjay Swaraj
- Vaquar Shaikh
- Abir Goswami as Akash (Episode 15)
- Vishal Watwani
- Gautami Kapoor
- Javed Khan
- Shanti Bhushan
- Shyam Ban
- Sameer Shanawade
- Aadesh Bharadwaj
- Shifali
- Joydeep Mukherjee
