= Kabhi Kabhie Ittefaq Sey =

Indian television drama series

- Created by: Leena Gangopadhyay
- Written by: Divy Nidhi Sharma (dialogues and lyrics); Aparajita Sharma (dialogues)
- Screenplay by: Vishal Watwani; Renu Watwani
- Story by: Leena Gangopadhyay
- Creative director: Sidhartha Vanakar
- Starring: Yesha Rughani; Manan Joshi
- Theme music composer: Nishant; Raja
- Opening theme: Kabhi Kabhie Ittefaq Sey by Shaan and Neeti Mohan
- Composer: Dhruv Dhalla
- Country of origin: India
- Original language: Hindi
- No. of episodes: 198

Production
- Producers: Rajesh Ram Singh; Leena Gangopadhyay; Saibal Banerjee; Pradeep Kumar; Pia Bajpiee; Shaika Parveen
- Cinematography: Shailesh Manore
- Editors: Sagar Patil; Maneesh Upadhyay
- Camera setup: Multi camera
- Production companies: Magic Moments Motion Pictures; Cockcrow & Shaika Entertainment

Original release
- Network: StarPlus
- Release: 3 January – 20 August 2022

Related
- Khorkuto

Kabhi Kabhie Ittefaq Sey (transl. Sometimes by Chance) is an Indian drama television series that premiered on 3 January 2022. It was aired on StarPlus and is digitally available on Disney+ Hotstar. It stars Yesha Rughani and Manan Joshi. It is a loose Hindi adaptation of Star Jalsha's Khorkuto. The series went off-air on 20 August 2022. It was replaced by Rajjo in its timeslot.

== Premise ==
Female protagonist Riddhima "Gungun" Bhatnagar lives with her father, Riddhesh and her aunt, Garima, and so she is not aware of the positives and negatives that come with living within a large family, such as the family of male main protagonist Anubhav "Anu" Kulshreshth. Anu and Gungun have opposite personalities; but fate still brings them together, ostensibly to complete the romantic love that is absent from their lives.

== Cast ==
=== Main ===
- Yesha Rughani as Riddhima "Gungun" Kulshreshth (née Bhatnagar): The chief editor and CEO of Jeet Network; Riddhesh and Maya's daughter; Anubhav's wife (2022)
- Manan Joshi as Dr. Anubhav "Anu" Kulshreshth: A scientist; Chandragupt and Sargam's son; Khushi's brother; Akriti;s ex-husband; Gungun's husband (2022)

=== Recurring ===
- Kanwarjit Paintal as Charudutt "Charu" Kulshreshth: Patriach of the Kulshreshth family; Chandragupt, Kiran and Chanchal's elder brother; Sunanda's husband; Yug and Rasika's father (2022)
- Yamini Singh as Sunanda Kulshreshth: Charudutt's wife; Yug and Rasika's mother (2022)
- Rajeev Kumar as Chandragupt "Chandru" Kulshreshth: Charudutt, Kiran and Chanchal's brother; Sargam's husband; Anubhav and Khushi's father (2022)
- Nishigandha Wad as Sargam Kulshreshth: Chandragupt's wife; Anubhav and Khushi's mother (2022)
- Mehul Nisar as Chanchal "Golu" Kulshreshth: Charudutt, Chandragupt and Kiran's brother; Divya's husband; Chhavi's father (2022)
- Naina Gupta as Divya Kulshreshth: Chanchal's wife; Chhavi's mother (2022)
- Delnaaz Irani as Kiran "Goli" (née Kulshreshth): Charudutt, Chandragupt and Chanchal's sister; Pratyush's wife (2022)
- Sandeep Rajora as Dr. Riddhesh Bhatnagar: Garima's brother; Maya's husband; Gungun's father (2022)
- Rushali Arora as Dr. Maya Bhatnagar: Riddhesh's widow; Gungun's estranged mother (2022)
- Shilpa Kadam as Garima Saxena (née Bhatnagar): Riddhesh's sister; Shankar's estranged wife; Akriti's estranged mother (2022)
- Anuj Khurana as Yug Kulshreshth: Charudutt and Sunanda's son; Rasika's brother; Neeti's husband (2022)
- Sonia Sharma as Neeti Kulshreshth: Yug's wife (2022)
- Priya Rore as Khushi Das (née Kulshreshth): Chandragupt and Sargam's daughter; Anubhav's younger sister; Ankit's wife (2022)
- Gourav Raj Puri as Ankit Das: Khushi's husband (2022)
- Akshita Tiwari as Chhavi Kulshreshth: Chanchal and Divya's daughter; Gungun's friend (2022)
- Riya Bhattacharjee as Akriti Saxena; Garima and Shankar's daughter; Anubhav's ex-wife (2022)
- Saim Khan as Ranvijay "Ronny" Saxena: Mithilesh and Poonam's son; Gungun's ex-boyfriend (2022)
- Romanch Mehta as Shankar Saxena: Garima's estranged husband; Akriti's father (2022)
- ActorsFirdaush as Rishi (2022)
- Shivani Mahajan as Dr. Kamini: Maya's friend; Sarwar's mother (2022)
- Sheel Verma as Dr. Sarwar: Kamini's son (2022)
- Imran Khan/Rohit Mehta as Pratyush: Kiran's husband (2022)
- Abha Parmar as Neighbor (2022)
- Sharik Khan as Neighbor (2022)
- Siddharth Dhawan as Terrorist Group Leader (2022)
- Riyaz Panjwani as Mithilesh Saxena: Poonam's husband; Ranvijay's father (2022)
- Unknown as Poonam Saxena: Mithilesh's wife; Ranvijay's mother (2022)
- Ankit Bathla as Armaan Shah: The former chief editor and CEO of Jeet Network; Gungun's friend and one-sided love interest (2022)
- Krishnakant Singh Bundela as Panditji

=== Guest appearances ===
- Ayesha Singh as Sai Joshi from Ghum Hai Kisikey Pyaar Meiin
- Neil Bhatt as Virat Chavan from Ghum Hai Kisikey Pyaar Meiin

== Production ==
=== Casting ===
The casting commenced in October 2021 and actors Delnaaz Irani and Rajiv Kumar were the first to be cast as pivotal recurring characters. Later, Mehul Nisar, Kanwarjit Paintal, Shilpa Kadam and several others actors too were roped in to play pivotal roles.

=== Development ===
The pre-production began in July 2021. Shooting commenced in October 2021 and various sequences were shot in Lucknow.

=== Release ===
The first promo was released on 1 November 2021, featuring the leads Yesha Rughani and Manan Joshi.

== Soundtrack ==
Kabhi Kabhie Ittefaq Sey Original Sound Track

Soundtrack album by Shaan and Neeti Mohan
- Released: 3 January 2022.
- Genre: Romance Soundtrack
- Length: 1:00 Minute(s)
- Language: Hindi
- Label: Star India
- Producers: Magic Moments Motion Pictures; Cockcrow & Shaika Entertainment

The song ‘Aate Jaate Khoobsurat’ was reverbed in a newer version as the title track for the show. It is sung by Shaan and Neeti Mohan.

== Adaptations ==
Language	Title	Original release	Network(s)	Last aired	Notes	Ref.
Bengali	Khorkuto খড়কুটো	17 August 2020	Star Jalsha	21 August 2022	Original	
Tamil	Namma Veetu Ponnu நம்ம வீட்டு பொண்ணு	16 August 2021	Star Vijay	25 March 2023	Remake	
Marathi	Thipkyanchi Rangoli ठिपक्यांची रांगोळी	4 October 2021	Star Pravah	18 November 2023	Remake	
Malayalam	Palunku പളുങ്ക്	22 November 2021	Asianet	30 December 2022	Remake	
Hindi	Kabhi Kabhie Ittefaq Sey कभी कभी इत्तेफाक से	3 January 2022	StarPlus	20 August 2022	Remake	
Kannada	Jenugudu ಜೇನುಗೂಡು	21 February 2022	Star Suvarna	30 September 2023	Remake	
