= Jaat Ki Jugni =

- Genre: Romance; Action; Comedy; Drama
- Directed by: Dillip Kumar; Pawan Kumar
- Creative director: Bhawna Bundela
- Starring: See below
- Voices of: Anand Raj; Sargam Jassu
- Theme music composer: Jaat Ki Jugni & Jaaniya
- Country of origin: India
- Original language: Hindi
- No. of seasons: 1
- No. of episodes: 70

Production
- Producer: Rashmi Sharma
- Production locations: Mumbai; Sonipat
- Editor: Hemanth Kumar
- Camera setup: Multi-camera
- Running time: 22 minutes approx.
- Production company: Rashmi Sharma Telefilms Limited

Original release
- Network: Sony TV
- Release: 3 April – 13 July 2017

Jat Ki Jugni - Ek Visphotak Prem Kahaani (transl. A Man's Woman- An explosive love story) of a rustic Jat guy from Haryana with a shy Jat girl, is an Indian television show, which premiered on 3 April 2017 on Sony TV. It stars Vishal Vashishtha, Madirakshi Mundle, Rinku Karmarkar, Yash Tonk, Richa Soni and Rakesh Pandey.

The show was rumoured to be based on the story of Karishma Kapoor and Daggubati Venkatesh starrer 1993 Hindi film Anari which is again a remake of 1991 Tamil film Chinna Thambi.

Vishal Vashishtha and Madirakshi Mundle play the lead roles.

== Plot ==
Love stories like Heer Ranjha, Sohni Mahiwal and Mirza Sahiban are considered legendary for showcasing the passion, the pain and the eventual separation of lovers. But this very notion of unhappy endings is what the protagonist Bittu disagrees with. Representing the rebellious nature of today's youth, he wants to change the popular belief with his own, that every love story must have a happy ending only.

While on the other side of the spectrum is Munni, who lives in the shadows of her brothers. A life which is highly protected, make believe and devoid of any men. When the path of the typical independent carefree fearless Jat boy Bittu crosses with timid and shy Jat girl Munni, there is bound to be firework, thus making Jaat Ki Jugni, a Visphotak Prem Kahani (an explosive love story).

== Cast ==
- Vishal Vashishtha as Bittu Singh Dahiya
- Madirakshi Mundle as Munni Singh Ahlawat/Munni Bittu Singh Dahiya
- Yash Tonk as Chaudhary Gajender Singh Ahlawat (Munni's elder brother)
- Richa Soni as Savita Gajender Singh Ahlawat
- Deepali Muchrikar as Muskaan Pratap Singh Ahlawat
- Aarya Dharamchand Kumar as Pratap Singh Ahlawat
- Rakesh Pandey as Khazan Singh Dahiya (Bittu's grandfather)
- Sagar Saini as Masterji/Daljeet Singh Dahiya (Bittu's Father)
- Rinku Karmarkar as Phool Kumari Dahiya (Bittu's mother)
- Amit Pachori as Bhim Singh Ahlawat
- Ashmyrrah Singhh as Sunaina Bhim Singh Ahlawat
- Barkha Singh as Jyoti (Munni's cousin)
- Paaras Madaan as Dr.Vikram (Jyoti's Lover)
