= Jai Hanuman – Sankatmochan Naam Tiharo =

Indian mythological television series

- Genre: Mythology; Drama
- Created by: Alind Srivastava; Nisser Parvej
- Written by: C.L.Saini
- Starring: Akshay Dogra; Madirakshi Mundle; Amar Upadhyay; Karan Suchak; Apara Mehta; see below
- Country of origin: India
- Original language: Hindi
- No. of seasons: 1
- No. of episodes: 89

Production
- Producers: Alind Srivastava; Nisser Parvej
- Camera setup: Multi-camera
- Running time: Approx. 20 minutes
- Production company: Peninsula Pictures

Original release
- Network: Dangal TV
- Release: 23 August – 3 December 2022

Jai Hanuman - Sankat Mochan Naam Tiharo is an Indian television mythology drama series that premiered from 23 August 2022 on Dangal TV. Produced by Alind Srivastava and Nissar Parvez under Peninsula Pictures, it stars Akshay Dogra, Madirakshi Mundle, Amar Upadhyay and Apara Mehta.

== Cast ==
- Akshay Dogra as Kali Yuga
- Madirakshi Mundle / Farnaz Shetty as Sita
- Amar Upadhyay / Karan Suchak as Rama
- Apara Mehta as Maiya Kaki
- Vishal Karwal as Lord Vishnu
- Sooraj Thapar as Ravana
- Aamir Dalvi as Sahasra Ravana
- Ram Yashvardhan as Hanumaan
- Abhishek Avasthi
- Yeshu Dhiman
- Romanch Mehta
- Nirbhay Wadhwa as
  - Sugriva
  - Vali
- Nissar Khan as Jambavan
- Radhika Chhabra
- Sanket Choukse
- Dinesh Mehta
- Atul Verma
- Sayantani Ghosh as Devi Parvati
- Shreya Patel
- Shahbaz Khan as Bhairavnath
- Rati Pandey as
  - Devi Chhaya
  - Devi Prabha
- Amit Pachori as Vibhishan
- Ishaan as Samundar dev

== Production ==
=== Casting ===
Initially, Anuj Sachdeva was in talks to play a cameo role, but declined due to prior commitments.

=== Development ===
The series was announced by Peninsula Pictures in August 2022 and confirmed by Dangal TV. It was mainly shot at the Film City, Mumbai.

=== Release ===
Jai Hanuman - Sankat Mochan Naam Tiharo promos were released in August 2022. It premeried on 23 August 2022 on Dangal TV. It went off-air within three months of its premiere on 3 December 2022, due to low viewership.

== See also ==
- List of programmes broadcast by Dangal TV
