= Savitri – Ek Prem Kahani =

- Also known as: Savitri
- Genre: Drama
- Screenplay by: Garima Goyal
- Directed by: Ranjan Kumar Singh, Anil V. Kumar, Santosh Bhatt, Saagar Kagra
- Country of origin: India
- Original language: Hindi
- No. of episodes: 163

Production
- Producers: Shabbir Ahluwalia and Sakett Saawhney
- Production company: Flying Turtles

Original release
- Network: Life OK
- Release: 18 February – 4 October 2013

Savitri is an Indian fantasy drama television show, which aired on Life OK from 18 February 2013 to 4 October 2013. The initial co-producers were Film Farm India, but before the series went on air, the production was switched to Flying Turtles. In August 2013, a cast revamp was carried out. The show is a modern take on the traditional Indian folktale of Savitri and Satyavan from the Mahabharata.

== Cast ==
- Avneet Kaur as Child Rajkumari Damayanti
- Riddhi Dogra as Rajkumari Damayanti / Savitri Satyavan Rai Choudhary
- Krip Suri as Rahukaal
- Yash Pandit / Ashish Kapoor as Senapati Veer / Satyavan Rai Choudhary
- Sumana Das as Mishti:
- Salil Ankola as Maharaj Damayanti's father
- Suchita Trivedi as Maharani: Damayanti's mother
- Angad Hasija as Dev
- Reshmi Ghosh as Gulika
- Ahad Ali Aamir as Rajkumar Divateen
- Indrani Haldar as Leena Rai Choudhary / Vishghati
- Karan Suchak as Vikrant
- Utkarsha Naik as Damayanti's mother
- Vahbbiz Dorabjee as Vishkamini
- Amit Behl as Senapati
- Puneet Vashisht as Dhumketu
