= Moon Banerjee =

Indian television actress

Moonmoon Banerjee
- Other name: Mahua
- Occupation: Actress
- Years active: 1997–present
- Known for: Kasautii Zindagi Kay; Sasural Genda Phool; Ek Tha Raja Ek Thi Rani; Kuch Rang Pyar Ke Aise Bhi
- Spouse(s): Gautam Joglekar (divorced) Neeraj Sharma (m. 2010)
- Children: Rumeer Sharma (son)

Moonmoon Banerjee, also known as Mahua, is an Indian television actress who was recognized for the role of Sampada Basu in Ekta Kapoor's soap Kasautii Zindagii Kay on Star Plus. Additionally, she acted as Panna in Sasural Genda Phool, as Asha Bose in Kuch Rang Pyar Ke Aise Bhi and as Damayanti in Ek Tha Raja Ek Thi Rani. Banerjee most recently starred on Star Bharat's Muskaan, where she played Gayatri Singh. She also played Uma Rawat in Muskuraane Ki Vajah Tum Ho.

== Personal life ==
Banerjee is married to producer Neeraj Sharma since 2010 and they have a son named Rumeer Sharma who was born on 6 April 2012.

== Filmography ==
| Year | Film | Role | Language | Notes |
|---|---|---|---|---|
| 2004 | Yagnam | Sailaja | Telugu | credited as Sameera Banerjee |

== Television ==
| Year | Serial | Role |
|---|---|---|
| 1997 | Saturday Suspense – Duplicate | Neha (Episode 11) |
| 1998–1999 | Chashme Baddoor | Shanta |
| 1998–1999 | Daraar | Moonmoon |
| 1999–2000 | Abhimaan | Kajri |
| 2000 | Khauff on Sony SAB – Intezaar: Part 1 & Part 2 | Preeti Rishabh Mathur (Episode 23 & Episode 24) |
| 2000–2001 | Meethi Meethi Baatein | |
| 2000–2001 | Ghar Ek Mandir | Kittu |
| 2000–2001 | Babul Ki Duwayen Leti Jaa | Sheetal |
| 2001–2002 | Kkusum | Ruhi Kapoor |
| 2001–2002 | Ek Tukdaa Chaand Ka | Ritu |
| 2002–2003 | Kammal | Shaina Bose |
| 2003 | Awaz – Dil Se Dil Tak | Ritika Bhaskar Gupta |
| 2004 | Rooh | Sucheta (Episode 3) |
| 2005 | Aahat | Neha |
| 2005 | Rooh | Priya (Episode 29) |
| 2005–2007 | Kasautii Zindagii Kay | Sampada Anurag Basu |
| 2006 | Kyunki Saas Bhi Kabhi Bahu Thi | Shraddha Ansh Gujral |
| 2006–2007 | Risshton Ki Dor | ACP Neha |
| 2010–2011 | Sasural Genda Phool | Panna Kashyap / Panna Raunak Sharma |
| 2015–2016 | Ek Tha Raja Ek Thi Rani | Damayanti |
| 2016–2017 | Kuch Rang Pyar Ke Aise Bhi | Asha Vijay Bose |
| 2018–2020 | Muskaan | Gayatri Teerath Singh |
| 2022 | Muskuraane Ki Vajah Tum Ho | Uma Rawat |
| 2023 | Sasural Simar Ka 2 | Sandhya Gajendra Oswal |
| 2023 | Ghum Hai Kisikey Pyaar Meiin | Geetanjali Bagchi / Geetanjali Ramakant Pujari |
| 2024 | Doree | Maya |
| 2025 | Noyontara | Paulomi Sengupta |
| 2026–present | Hey Bhagwan – Kitna Badal Gaya Insaan! | |
