= Aadha Full =

2016 Indian TV series

- Genre: Action drama
- Starring: Neelanshi Singh; Ahsaas Channa; Richa Soni; Ishaan Singh Manhas; Sahnil Bhatnagar; Harsh Mayar; Mallika Ghai; Roshni Soni; Aaloak Kapoor
- Original language: Hindi
- No. of episodes: 78

Production
- Production company: Sunshine Productions

Original release
- Release: 21 October 2016

Aadha Full was a 2016 Indian Hindi-language coming-of-age action-drama series created by BBC Media Action in association with UNICEF. The series comprises 78 episodes and was released on DD National in October 2016. Produced by Sunshine Productions, the series starred Richa Soni, Ahsaas Khanna, and Harsh Mayar.

== Plot ==
Aadha Full is based on social challenges faced by youth of today's generation. The story revolves around three teenager, Adrak, Tara and Kitty who are best friends for each other and live in a small town called Badlapur. These three form a team called Aadha Full to solve mystery and crime cases that take place in their town trying to make their small town a better place to live in. The series addresses coming of age issues such as under-age marriage, sex-selective abortion, dowry, fair skin and beauty myths, sexual health, stereotyping of women and girls.

== Cast ==
- Neelanshi Singh as Tara
- Ahsaas Channa as Kitty
- Sahnil Bhatnagar as Narpat
- Richa Soni as Roshni
- Ishaan Singh Manhas as Arjun
- Harsh Mayar as Adrak
- Aaloak Kapoor as Police Officer (Karishma's Father)
- Mallika Ghai as Kamlesh
- Shefali Rana as Beauty aunty
- Nabeel Ahmed as Rohan

== Production ==
The theme of the show was sung by Bollywood playback singer-composer Salim Merchant. Bollywood actress Priyanka Chopra, who is also a UNICEF's National Ambassador, had recorded a special video to send her best wishes to the team of Aadha Full.
