= Musakaan (2018 TV series) =

Indian television series

- Genre: Soap opera; Family drama
- Created by: Rashmi Sharma
- Written by: Rashmi Sharma; Sushill Choubey; Shilpa Choubey; Aayush Agrawal
- Screenplay by: Sancheeta Bose
- Story by: Rashmi Sharma
- Directed by: Dilip kumar
- Starring: Sharad Malhotra; Yesha Rughani
- Country of origin: India
- Original language: Hindi
- No. of seasons: 1
- No. of episodes: 499

Production
- Executive producers: Guddu Jha; Aayush Agrawal
- Producers: Pawan Kumar Marut; Rashmi Sharma
- Running time: 21 minutes
- Production company: Rashmi Sharma Telefilms Pvt. Ltd.

Original release
- Network: Star Bharat
- Release: 29 May 2018 – 4 January 2020

Musakaan (transl. Smile) is an Indian television series produced by Rashmi Sharma, under the banner of Rashmi Sharma Telefilms Pvt. Ltd., which premiered on 29 May 2018 on Star Bharat, replacing Jai Kanhaiya Lal Ki. It starred Sharad Malhotra and Yesha Rughani.

== Plot ==
The story is about Aarti, a bar-dancer and her daughter Muskaan, who faces social ostracism because of Aarti's profession and yearns to stay with her. Muskaan studies in Darjeeling; Aarti is in Kolkata. Later, Muskaan starts to live with Aarti, in her brothel. Aarti fears about Muskaan's future. Aarti is framed for a murder and is jailed. Teerath Singh aka Sir Ji and brothel owner, Tabassum ask Aarti to separate from Muskaan if she wants Muskaan to study. Unwillingly, Aarti agrees and parts ways from Muskaan.

Muskaan grows up to be timid and strong-minded, dedicated to her studies. She collides with Raunak Singh, and they fall in love and face many hurdles along the way. Aarti has lost her memory and thinks that Muskaan is still a child. Raunak turns out to be Teerath's son. Eventually, Aarti regains her memory and reunites with Muskaan. But, she dies in a bomb blast planned by Teerath. With Raunak's help, Muskaan trains to become a police officer to give Teerath his utmost punishment. Later, Raunak and Muskaan happily get married. Muskaan delivers twin daughters, but Teerath escapes with one of them, bribing the nurse to lie that baby has died. Later, Muskaan and Raunak meet with an accident and Muskaan is presumed dead.

Muskaan is alive and lives as Mira Bose in Bangladesh hiding from the police, as falsely framed for a murder, and returns to find Raunak. Teerath lives with Muskaan and Raunak's daughter, Roshni while Raunak has married a woman named Nisha to take care of his daughter, Khushi. Eventually, Muskaan and Raunak meet each other and find about Roshni. Nisha tries to separate them, but is exposed and apologises to Raunak and Muskaan. Teerath is arrested for his crimes. Finally, Muskaan and Raunak get married again and live happily ever after with Khushi and Roshni.

== Cast ==
=== Main ===
- Yesha Rughani as Muskaan Bose Singh / Mira Bose (Fake) – Arati and Subodh's daughter; Raunak's wife; Khushi and Roshni's mother.
  - Sonakshi Save as Child Muskaan Bose
- Sharad Malhotra as Raunak Singh – Gayatri and Teerath's son; Dolly and Lovely's brother; Nisha's ex-husband; Muskaan's husband; Khushi and Roshni's father.

=== Recurring ===
- Avyana Chhorwani as Khushi Singh – Muskaan and Raunak's elder daughter; Nisha's foster daughter; Roshni's twin sister.
- Maahi Soni as Roshni Singh – Muskaan and Raunak's younger daughter; Khushi's twin sister.
- Arina Dey as Aarti Farazi Bose – Former bar-dancer; Subodh's wife; Suzanne's sister; Musakaan's mother; Khushi and Roshni's grandmother. (Dead)
- Sudesh Berry as Teerath Singh aka Sirji – A brothel owner; Gayatri's husband; Dolly, Lovely and Raunak's father; Khushi and Roshni's grandfather.
- Moonmoon Banerjee as Gayatri Singh – Teerath's wife; Dolly, Lovely and Raunak's mother; Khushi and Roshni's grandmother.
- Devanshee Vyas as Damini "Dolly" Singh – Gayatri and Teerath's elder daughter; Lovely and Raunak's sister.
- Vandana Singh as Lovely Singh – Gayatri and Teerath's younger daughter; Dolly and Raunak's sister. (Dead)
- Kirtida Mistry as Nisha Singh – Raunak's ex-wife; Khushi's foster mother.
- Shital Antani as Sheetal Singh Bhatia – Bunty's mother; Raunak's aunt
- Tarun Khurana as Hanumant Yadav – Raunak's close friend
- Puneesh Sharma as Balbir "Bunty" Bhatia – Dolly, Lovely and Raunak's cousin
- Anamika Tiwari as Tabassum – Brothel owner
- Lavina Tandon as Suzzane Farazi – Aarti's sister; Musakaan's aunt
- Karam Rajpal as Sujoy Das – Rakhi's son; Sapna's brother; Musakaan's lover
- Jyotsna Chandola as Sapna Das – Rakhi's daughter; Sujoy's sister
- Richa Soni as Rakhi Das – Sujoy and Sapna's mother
- Aaditya Bajpayee as Rahul Patel – Raunak's colleague
- Tanu Khan as Kajal Bisht – Balraj and Pramila's daughter; Raunak's lover
- Rushad Rana as Balraj Bisht – Pramila's husband; Kajal's father
- Preeti Puri as Pramila Bisht – Balraj's wife; Kajal's mother
- Sangeeta Panwar as Kamlesh – Hukum and Malik's mother
- Shaurya Vardhan Sharma as Inspector Manohar Basu
- Aashish Kaul as Dinesh Sinha – A V.I.P. Guest
- Amit Kher as Mahesh Chaddha – Bar Head
- Sanarika as Kriti – bar dancer
- Himanshi Jain / Preetika Chauhan as Jaya
- Shivam Singh Raghuvanshi as Mr.Raichand (Jaya's groom-to-be)
- Monisha Doley as Lomi
- Aishana Singh as Deepa
- Avinash Singh Chouhan as Bouncer
- Mahi Khan as Neha
- Deepraj Rana as Malik
