= Shahabuddin Rathod =

Indian scholar, teacher, and humorist

Shahabuddin Rathod (Padma Shree)
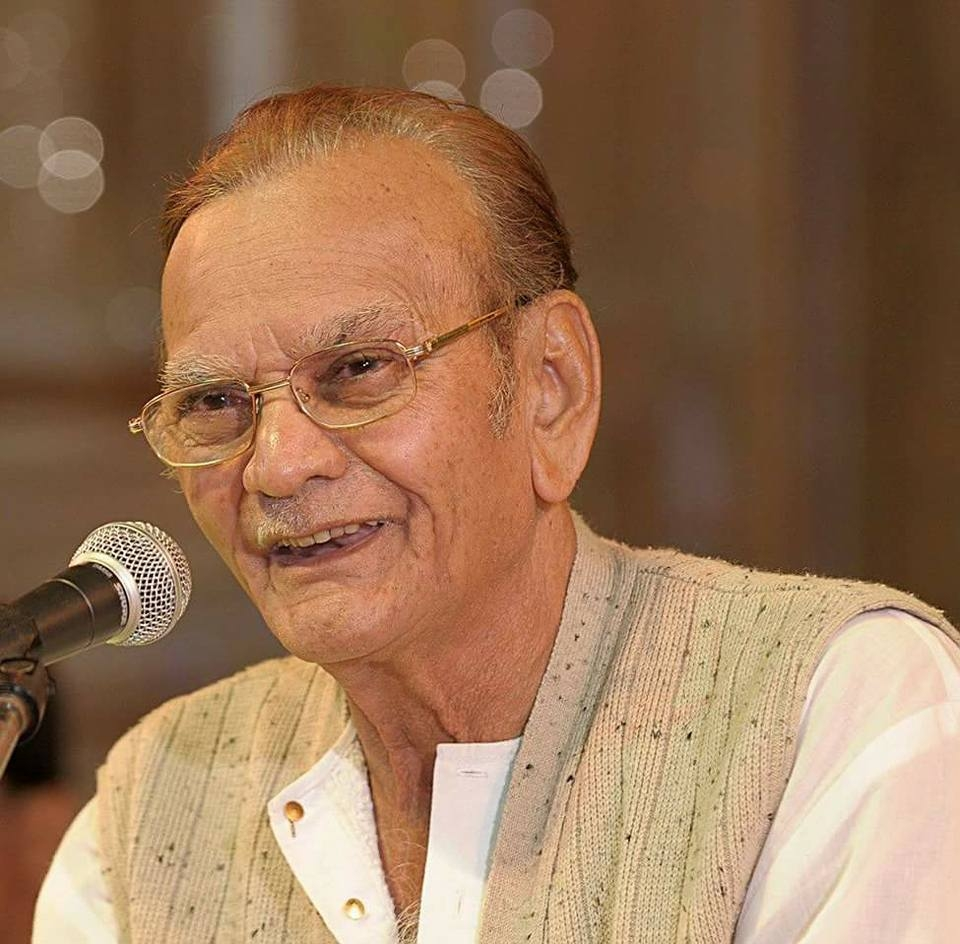
- Born: 9 December 1937 (age 88); Thangadh near Surendranagar, India
- Occupations: Humorist (1971 – present); Writer; Teacher (1958 - 1971); Principal (1971 - 1996)
- Spouse: Sabira (1971 – present)
- Children: 4

Shahabuddin Rathod is a Gujarati scholar, teacher and humorist. He was awarded Padma Shri in the field of literature and education in 2020.

== Life ==
Shahabuddin Rathod was born on 9 December 1937 at Thangadh (now in Surendranagar district, Gujarat, India). He was born and raised in a Gujarati Muslim family. He was a teacher from 1958 to 1971 and a school principal from 1971 to 1996. In addition to a good knowledge about his Islamic background and faith, he has also learned about Sanskrit language and Hinduism.

He is awarded Padma Shri, fourth highest civilian award in India, for his services in the field of literature and education in 2020.

== Works ==
His humour books include Mare Kya Lakhavu Hatu?, Hasata-Hasavata, Anmol Atithya, Sajjan Mitrona Sangathe, Dukhi Thavani Kala, Show Must Go On, Lakh Rupiayani Vaat, Devu To Marad Kare, Maro Gadhedo Dekhay Chhe?, Hasyano Varghodo, Darpan Juth Na Bole. He had written 10 books in Gujarati and one in Hindi. Jagdish Trivedi has edited four more books from his works.

=== Adaptations of his works ===
The television comedy series Papad Pol – Shahabuddin Rathod Ki Rangeen Duniya is based on his work. His works are also adapted into films such as Shahabuddin Rathodno Hasyano Varghodo (Gujarati, 2010).
