= Hastinapur Ke Veer =

- Genre: Mythology
- Created by: Nissar Parvez; Alind Srivastava
- Based on: Mahabharata
- Written by: Amit Aryan
- Screenplay by: Faizal Akhtar
- Story by: Shanti Bhushan; Prabhat Kumar
- Directed by: Saranga Dutta; Maan Singh Manku
- Starring: Athar Khan; Subhash Singh; Urva Savaliya; Harit Gabani; Mayank Yadav; Venkatesh Pande
- Theme music composer: Souvyk Chakraborty
- Country of origin: India
- Original language: Hindi
- No. of seasons: 1
- No. of episodes: 146+

Production
- Producers: Nissar Parvez; Alind Srivastava
- Cinematography: Akash Yadav
- Camera setup: Multi-camera
- Running time: 20–25 minutes
- Production company: Peninsula Pictures

Original release
- Network: Sony SAB
- Release: 2 June 2026 – present

Hastinapur Ke Veer (transl.: The Brave of Hastinapur) is an Indian mythological television series produced by Peninsula Pictures which premiered on 2 June 2026 on Sony SAB. It stars Athar Khan, Subhash Singh, Urva Savaliya, Harit Gabani, Mayank Yadav and Venkatesh Pande

== Summary ==
Five noble brothers unite with courage and righteousness to battle the ruthless forces of ambition and injustice that threaten their kingdom, testing their bonds through sacrifice and unwavering devotion to dharma.

== Cast ==
=== Main ===
- Athar Khan as Young Yudhishthira: King Pandu and Queen Kunti's eldest son; Eldest Pandava brother; Yamraj's divine son; Karna's younger brother; Bheema and Arjuna's elder brother; Nakula and Sahadeva's elder half-brother; Cousin of 100 Kauravas and Dushala
- Subhash Singh as Young Bheema: King Pandu and Queen Kunti's second son; Second Pandava brother; Vayu Dev's divine son; Karna and Yudhishthira's younger brother; Arjuna's elder brother; Nakula and Sahadeva's elder half-brother; Cousin of 100 Kauravas and Dushala
- Urva Savaliya as Young Arjuna: King Pandu and Queen Kunti's youngest son; Third Pandava brother; Indra Dev's divine son; Karna, Yudhishthira and Bheema's younger brother; Nakula and Sahadeva's elder half-brother; Cousin of 100 Kauravas and Dushala
- Harit Gabani as Young Nakula: King Pandu and Queen Madri's eldest twin son; Fourth Pandava brother; Ashvini Kumar's divine son; Karna, Yudhishthira, Bheema and Arjuna's younger half-brother; Sahadeva's elder twin brother; Cousin of 100 Kauravas and Dushala
- Mayank Yadav as Young Sahadeva: King Pandu and Queen Madri's youngest twin son; Youngest Pandava brother; Ashvini Kumar's divine son; Karna, Yudhishthira, Bheema and Arjuna's younger half-brother; Nakula's younger twin brother; Cousin of 100 Kauravas and Dushala
- Venkatesh Pande as Young Karna: Surya Dev and Princess Kunti's premarital son; Friend of Duryodhana; Elder Brother of Pandavas; Adhiratha and Radha's Adoptive son
- Aayudh Bhanushali as Young Duryodhana: King Dhritarashtra and Queen Gandhari's eldest son; Cousin of Pandavas
- Shaurya Upadhyay as Young Dushasana: King Dhritarashtra and Queen Gandhari's second son; Cousin of Pandavas
- Toral Rasputra as Kunti: King Shurasena and Queen Marisha's daughter; King Kuntibhoja's adoptive daughter; King Pandu's first wife; Karna, Yudhishthira, Bheema and Arjuna's mother; Nakula and Sahadeva's foster-mother
- Manish Wadhwa as Bhishma: King Shantanu and Devi Ganga's eighth son; Queen Satyavati's step-son; King Chitrangada and King Vichitravirya's half-brother; King Dhritarashtra and King Pandu's uncle; Pandavas, Kauravas and Dushala's grandfather
- Chandan Anand as Shakuni: King Subala's son; King of Gandhara; Queen Gandhari's younger brother; Maternal uncle of Kauravas and Dushala
- Sandeep Mohan as Dhritarashtra: King Vichitravirya's legal son; Sage Vyasa and Queen Ambika's biological son; Queen Gandhari and Maid Sukhada's husband; Father of Kauravas and Dushala; Pandu's elder brother; Minister Vidhura's elder half-brother; King of Hastinapur
- Vivana Singh as Gandhari: King Subala's daughter; Queen of Hastinapur; King Dhritarashtra's wife; Mother of Kauravas and Dushala; King Shakuni's elder sister
- Jiten Lalwani as Dronacharya: Sage Bharadvaja's son; Kripi's husband; Ashvatthama's father; Teacher of Pandavas, Kauravas and Karna

=== Recurring ===
- Vikas Salgotra as Vidhura: Sage Vyasa and Maid Parishrami's son; Lord Yama's incarnation; King Dhritarashtra and King Pandu's younger half-brother; Paternal uncle of Pandavas, Kauravas and Dushala
- Dhaval Tripathi as Young Ashvatthama: Guru Dronacharya and Kripi's son
- Harleen Rekhi as Kripi: Sage Sharadhvan and Apsara Janapati's daughter; King Shantanu's adopted daughter; Kripacharya's twin sister; Guru Dronacharya's wife; Ashvatthama's mother; Teacher of Dushala and Devika
- Sanchi Kaur as Young Dushala: King Dhritarashtra and Queen Gandhari's only daughter; Younger sister of Kauravas; Cousin of Pandavas
- Shreya Patel as Young Devika: Princess of Shibi; Daughter of Govasena
- Vyom Thakkar as Young Yuyutsu: King Dhritarashtra and Vaishya maid's son; Cousin of Pandavas
- Ritvik Chaudhary as Young Vikarna: King Dhritarashtra and Queen Gandhari's son; Cousin of Pandavas
- Yug Bhanushali as Young Chitrabana: King Dhritarashtra and Queen Gandhari's son; Cousin of Pandavas
- Rivaan Thakkar as Young Chitravarma: King Dhritarashtra and Queen Gandhari's son; Cousin of Pandavas
- Nitin Tiwari as Young Suvarma: King Dhritarashtra and Queen Gandhari's son; Cousin of Pandavas
- Sparsh Sonawane as Young Sulochan: King Dhritarashtra and Queen Gandhari's son; Cousin of Pandavas
- Reyansh Goswami as Young Jarasandha: King Dhritarashtra and Queen Gandhari's son; Cousin of Pandavas
- Kavish Mahajan as Young Dirghabahu: King Dhritarashtra and Queen Gandhari's son; Cousin of Pandavas
- Chetanya Adib as Kripacharya: Sage Sharadhvan and Apsara Janapati's son; King Shantanu's adopted son; Kripi's twin brother; Teacher of Pandavas and Kauravas
- Shailesh Datar as Veda Vyasa: Rishi Parashara and Queen Satyavati's son; Queen Ambika, Queen Ambalika and Maid Parishrami's niyoga partner; Bhishma, Chitangada, Vichitravirya's half-brother; King Dhritarashtra, King Pandu and Minister Vidhura's biological father; Author of Mahabharata; Lord Vishnu's incarnation
- Ahnaf Khatri as Ganapati: Lord Shiva and Devi Parvati's youngest son; Lord Kartikeya's younger brother; Writter of Mahabharata
- Arjun Shukla as Young Ekalavya: Prince of Nishada
- Richa Soni as Radha: Karna's foster mother
- Aanand Dev as Adhirath: Karna's foster father

=== Other Cast ===
- Rohan Jadhav as Young Sahadeva: King Jarasandha's son; Prince of Magadh
- Aabhaas Mehta as Jarasandha: King of Magadh
- Anshu Varshney as Jara: King Jarasandha's Adoptive Mother
- Rushiraj Pawar as
  - Alambusha: A Powerful Demon; Alayudha's brother; Duryodhana's friend; Enemy of Pandavas
  - Alayudha: A Powerful Demon; Alambusha's brother; Duryodhana's friend; Enemy of Pandavas
- Raviz Thakur as Vasuki: Sage Kashyap and Nagmata Kadru's son; The King of Naglok; Kunti's great-grandfather
- Arjita Gibson as Nagrani: The Queen of Naglok; Nagraj Vasuki's wife
- Vishal Patni as Takshaka: The King of Snakes; Ashvasena's father
- Prachi Thakur / Neha Badiswal as Vishkanya Madhuli: King Jarasandha's hetchwoman
- Sneha Kaur as Nageshwari: Nagraj Vasuki's great grand-daughter; Cousin of Pandavas
- Vinisha Batunge as Moora's daughter
- Renu Robin as Moora
- Param Soni as Chakradhar
- Ashok Chaudhary as Mukhiya Lobarath
- Akshay Bhagat as Bhagirath: Cousin of Karna
- Akshay Verma as Hayavadan
- Kumud Kant as Nagmantri
- Aman Sehgal as Veer Sainik
- Jijiksha Pathak as Chitra: Palace maid
- Rithik Chauhan as Guptarajan
- Parikshit Sawant as Ketu: Ekalavya's friend
- Rohit Yadav as Dwarpaal
- Manjeet Singh Gauhar as Astrakar
- Rohit Rathore as Pishach
- Shubham Jaibeer Sahrawat as King Pratyaksh

=== Episodic Appearance ===
- Raj Logani as Pandu: King Vichitravirya's legal son; Sage Vyasa and Queen Ambalika's biological son; Queen Kunti and Queen Madri's husband; Father of Pandavas; King Dhritarashtra's younger half-brother; Minister Vidhura's elder half-brother
- Sonali Nikam as Ganga: King Himavan and Queen Mainavati's eldest daughter; Devi Parvati's elder sister; King Bhishma's mother

== Production ==
=== Casting ===
Toral Rasputra was confirmed to play Kunti. Chandan Anand was selected to play Shakuni. Vivana Singh was cast as Gandhari.
