= Papad Pol – Shahabuddin Rathod Ki Rangeen Duniya =

- Genre: Sitcom
- Written by: Vipul D Shah
- Starring: See below
- Country of origin: India
- Original language: Hindi
- No. of seasons: 1
- No. of episodes: 309

Production
- Producers: Vipul D Shah; Sanjiv Sharma
- Camera setup: Multi-camera
- Running time: 24 minutes
- Production company: Optimystix Entertainment

Original release
- Network: SAB TV
- Release: 28 June 2010 – 23 September 2011

Papad Pol - Shahbuddin Rathod ki Rangeen Duniya is an Indian television series which aired on Sony SAB. It was based on characters by Shahabuddin Rathod.

== Premise ==
Papad Pol is based on characters by Shahabuddin Rathod, who are a very simple and relatable middle-class people living together in a "Pol".

== Cast ==
- Swapnil Joshi as Vinay Chand Parikh
- Ami Trivedi as Kokila Parikh
- Tapan Bhatt as Jayantilal Parikh
- Alpana Buch as Kantaben Parikh
- Sanika raghawa as priya
- Vipul Vithlani as Ghanubha Darbar
- Lavina Tandon as Ranjanba Darbar
- Abhay Harpade as Batuklal Mehta
- Dimple Kawa as Bhavnaben Mehta
- Sunil Vishrani as Labhchand Merai
- Deepmala as Dakshaben Merai
- Rehman Khan as Manubhai Patel
- Tulika Patel as Hetal Patel
- Amish Tanna as Jivla Patel
- Pankaj Dheer as Businessman
- Amit Varma as Dev
