= Yesha Rughani =

Indian television actress

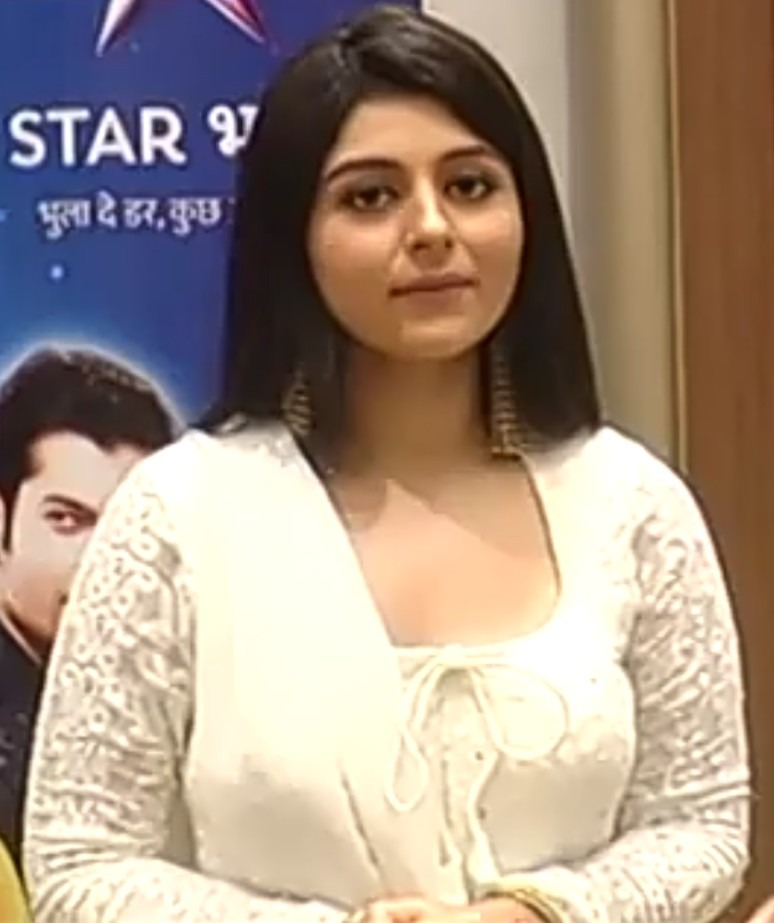
- Yesha in 2019
- Occupation: Actress
- Years active: 2017–present
- Known for: Jeet Gayi Toh Piya Morey; Muskaan; Hero – Gayab Mode On

Yesha Rughani is an Indian actress. She rose to fame starring as the titular character in Star Bharat's Muskaan. Rughani is known for portraying Devi/Devika in Jeet Gayi Toh Piya Morey and Zara in Hero – Gayab Mode On. Recently, she was seen as the female lead in Kabhi Kabhie Ittefaq Sey as Riddhima "Gungun" Bhatnagar.

== Early life ==
Before pursuing her career in acting, Rughani worked as a stylist for Priyanka Chopra, Esha Gupta, Malaika Arora among others.

== Career ==
In 2017, Rughani made her television debut with Jeet Gayi Toh Piya Morey opposite Krip Suri. She got praise for her dual roles as mother and daughter, and was extremely well received.

After that from May 2018, she played the titular character of a young woman who was ostracized by society due to her mother's profession in Muskaan opposite Sharad Malhotra, a role for which she earned critical acclaim.

In 2020, she started starring as Zara in Sony SAB's fantasy series Hero – Gayab Mode On opposite Abhishek Nigam.

In January 2022, Rughani played Gungun in StarPlus's Kabhi Kabhie Ittefaq Sey opposite Manan Joshi.

From February 2024 to December 2024, she was playing the lead role of Ibaadat Akhtar Siddiqui opposite Dheeraj Dhoopar in Zee TV's Rabb Se Hai Dua post generation leap.

== Filmography ==
=== Television ===
Year	Title	Role	Ref.
2017–2018	Jeet Gayi Toh Piya Morey	Devi Chauhan Rajawat	
2018	Jeet Gayi Toh Piya Morey	Devika Rajawat Babbar	
2018–2020	Musakaan	Muskaan Bose Singh	
2020–2021	Hero – Gayab Mode On	Zara	
2022	Kabhi Kabhie Ittefaq Sey	Riddhima "Gungun" Bhatnagar Kulshreshth	
2024	Rabb Se Hai Dua	Ibaadat "Ibbu" Akhtar Siddiqui	

=== Music videos ===
Year	Title	Singer	Ref.
2023	Meri Aashiqui	Saaj Bhatt	

== Awards and nominations ==
Year	Award	Category	Work	Result	Ref.
2018	Gold Awards	Debut in a Lead Role - Female	Musakaan	Nominated	
