= Hero – Gayab Mode On =

- Genre: Sci-fi; Action
- Screenplay by: Faizal Akhtar; Pallavi Mehta
- Directed by: Man Singh Manku; Suraj Rao
- Starring: See below
- Opening theme: Season 1 Tu Hai Mera; Hero Main Tera; Season 2 Aaya Hero Aaya
- Composers: Souvyk Chakraborty; Singer; Aabhik Ghosh
- Country of origin: India
- Original language: Hindi
- No. of seasons: 2
- No. of episodes: 236

Production
- Producers: Alind Srivastava; Nissar Parvez; Sakshi Takkar
- Camera setup: Multi-camera
- Running time: 19-24 minutes
- Production company: Peninsula Pictures

Original release
- Network: Sony SAB
- Release: 7 December 2020 – 30 October 2021

Hero – Gayab Mode On (transl. Hero – Invisible Mode On) is an Indian Hindi-language science fiction action television series. The show revolves around a man who finds a ring which gives him supernatural powers. He must fight alien forces who are after the ring and save the world, aided by his friends and family. It was on aired from 7 December 2020 to 30 October 2021 on Sony SAB. It stars Abhishek Nigam as the titular character.

== Series overview ==
Season	No. of episodes	Originally broadcast (India)	
Season	No. of episodes	First aired	Last aired
1	182	7 December 2020	20 August 2021
2	54	23 August 2021	30 October 2021

== Plot ==
=== Season 1 ===
In an ancient era of gods and asuras (demons, actually aliens from Venus), a mystic invisibility ring is lost in an epic battle. The ring becomes a myth, believed only by scientist Amal who is arrested in a scam and disappears.

Amal's son Veer, a movie stuntman, finds the ring of invisibility. The asura guru Shukracharya sends minions to retrieve it, and in a series of battles Veer unlocks successive powers of the ring and is known as "Hero". Among his adversaries is a brainwashed Amal now known as Dansh who returns to the family to get the ring. This is revealed to Veer in a fight with Rocky who obtained electrical powers and joined with the aliens. Veer surrenders the ring to save Mumbai from destruction. Amal instinctively saves Veer; confused by this action, he undertakes a quest to learn his identity. Rocky pretends to execute Amal and is made the aliens' commander of Earth.

Meanwhile, injured Veer is rescued by Shivaay, who trains him. Veer saves his family from an alien infiltrator and again saves Mumbai. Veer assembles an ancient weapon but hesitates to use it on Amal, and recognizes Amal as his father. Veer and Shivaay become conflicted over Amal's fate. Rocky pretends to be an ally to Hero so that he can gain possession of the ring, but Veer tricks him and Rocky loses control of his powers and dies. Protecting Shivaay, Amal is redeemed but killed. Shivaay and Veer undertake a quest to resurrect Amal, which costs Shivaay his asura powers.

Shukracharya develops a doomsday weapon to destroy the ring but it is destroyed by Veer and his long-lost mother; meanwhile, his girlfriend Zara sacrifices herself in an attempt to stop the weapon by obtaining an object called Amrit and Shukracharya kidnapped Shivaay, after that no one knows about him. Afterwards, Veer experiences behavioural changes and suspects the ring is making him evil but he can no longer remove it. The poisoning of the ring by the doomsday weapon can only be neutralized with the use of Amrit, but the asuras have already secured it.

=== Season 2 ===
Three months have passed, and Veer has become an anti-Hero, who saves citizens but is cruel toward his adversaries. He reveals his identity to the world. Mad scientist The Professor kidnaps the chief minister of Maharashtra and demands a biological weapon from CM. The hero arrives and saves the hostages, though The Professor gets away and police officer Aditi's assistance goes unrecognized. Veer challenges Aditi to identify The Professor before he does. Shukracharya and his goons infiltrate Earth, posing as Veer's new neighbours. Veer finds out about the same and soon fights off them.

Veer and Aditi are adversarial initially but join forces to save the city and their alliance slowly blossoms into friendship and then love. At last, the duo gets married.

== Cast ==
=== Season 1 ===
==== Main ====
- Abhishek Nigam as Veer Nanda/Hero: a kind-hearted stuntman; Amal and Sandhya's son; Sweeti and Meethi's elder brother; later Shivaay's adoptive brother; Bantu's best friend; Zara's love interest and a rival to his cousin Rocky (2020-2021)
- Siddharth Nigam as Shivaay Nanda: A good Asur who looks like a young man; an ardent devotee of Lord Shiva; adopted as Amal Nanda's second son, thereby becoming Veer, Sweeti and Meethi's brother; Zara and Bantu's best friend; he was kidnapped by Shukracharya and never seen again (2021)
- Yesha Rughani as Zara : an aspiring actress and Veer's love; Bantu and Shivaay's best friend (2020-2021)
- Manish Wadhwa as Amal Nanda/Dansh: Sandhya's husband, and Veer, Sweeti, Meethi's father and Shivaay's adoptive father, Rocky's uncle, Bantu's adoptive uncle; Ranjeet, and Bindu's brother-in-law/a dangerous alien (2020-2021)
- Ajay Gehi as Guru Shukracharya: the main antagonist of the series and the lord of the planet Venus and teacher of Asuras (2020-2021)

==== Recurring ====
- Shweta Dadhich as Sandhya Nanda: Amal's wife; Veer, Shivaay, Sweeti, Meethi's mother; Ranjeet's elder sister (2020-2021)
- Samriddhi Mehra as Sweeti Nanda: Veer's younger sister; Meethi's one minute younger twin sister; later Shivaay's adoptive sister; Amal and Sandhya's daughter (2020-2021)
- Surabhi Mehra as Meethi Nanda: Veer's younger sister; Sweeti's one minute elder twin sister; later Shivaay's adoptive sister; Amal and Sandhya's daughter (2020-2021)
- Abhishek Sharma as Bantu Sindhwani: Veer, Zara and Shivaay's best friend; Ranjeet and Bindu's adopted son; adoptive brother of Rocky (2020-2021)
- Nitesh Pandey as Ranjeet Sidhwani: Veer's uncle; Sandhya's elder brother; Bindu's husband; Rocky's father; Bantu's adoptive father (2020-2021)
- Sonia Singh as Bindu Sidhwani: Ranjeet's wife; Rocky's mother; Bantu's adoptive mother; Veer, Sweeti, Meethi's aunt (2020-2021)
- Keshav Sadhna as Rocky Sidhwani: Ranjeet and Bindu's son; Bantu's adoptive brother; Amal's nephew; Veer's cousin transformed into an alien (2020-2021)
- Abhishek Mohan Gaikwad as Inspector Patil (2020-2021)
- Soni Singh as Kuntal Kamini: a sorceress, who tries to contact Rocky's soul for Bindu; stole Amrit (nectar) to obtain immortality but is killed by Asuras (2020-2021)
- Aditi Chopra as Shaanu: Zara's fashion stylist and assistant (2020-2021)
- Vijay Kashyap as Professor Bhatkal: Amal's mentor (2020-2021)
- Ujjwal Singh as Achal: Vyom's sidekick and Vichal's brother (2020-2021)
- Kailash Topnani as Vichal: Vyom's sidekick, and Achal's brother. He was an ally to both Veer and Bantu; sacrificed himself while saving Bantu from Rocky (2020-2021)
- Ajay Sharma as Doctor M.K. Tripathi: DRSO's spy (2020-2021)
- Amit Kalra as Shwan: Vyom's accomplice in search of the ring; killed by Vyom (2020-2021)
- Aradhana Sharma as Nyla: a journalist (2020-2021)
- Diwakar Pundir as Lord Shiva (2021)
- Antara Banerjee/Sonyaa Ayodhya as Aloma: an accomplice of Demon Supreme and a rival to Dansh; gave Rocky gadgets to kill Hero but was ultimately killed by Rocky (2021)
- Lavanya Bhardwaj as Tarakasur, the king of all Asurs: The most powerful asura who implanted part of his soul in Amal's body to make him Dansh (2021)
- Krip Suri as Jwalasura: Guru Shukracharya's student and leader of the Raksha Mandal gang; had power to produce fire and control energy (2021)
- Nandani Tiwary as Mayawani: a dangerous monstress in Pataal Lok; her father Mayasur is the king of Talatal Lok who is captured by Shukracharya (2021)
- Ram Awana as Nirbhayasur: a dangerous asura who holds Amal and his family hostage; surrendered himself and fled (2021)

=== Season 2 ===
==== Main ====
- Abhishek Nigam as Veer Nanda/Hero: a kind-hearted stuntman; Amal and Sandhya's son; Sweeti and Meethi's elder brother; Shivaay’s adoptive brother; Bantu's childhood best friend and adopted cousin; Aditi's husband (2021)
- Tunisha Sharma as ASP Aditi Nanda (née Jamwal): Arjun's sister; Veer's wife; A brave police officer (2021)
- Ajay Gehi as Guru Shukracharya: the main antagonist of the series and the lord of the planet Venus and teacher of Asuras (2021)

==== Recurring ====
- Siddharth Vasudev as Professor: Kavita's husband; a mad scientist who wanted to destroy the world; turned into an asur by Shukracharya and killed by Veer (2021)
- Shweta Dadhich as Sandhya Nanda: Amal's wife; Veer, Sweeti and Meethi's mother; Ranjeet's elder sister (2021)
- Samriddhi Mehra as Sweeti Nanda: Veer's younger sister; Shivaay’s adoptive younger sister; Meethi's elder twin sister; Amal and Sandhya's daughter (2021)
- Surabhi Mehra as Meethi Nanda: Veer's younger sister; Shivaay’s younger adoptive sister; Sweeti's younger twin sister, Amal and Sandhya's daughter (2021)
- Abhishek Sharma as Bantu Sidhwani: Veer's childhood best friend; Ranjeet and Bindu's adopted son; adoptive brother of Rocky (2021)
- Nitesh Pandey as Ranjeet Sidhwani: Veer's caring uncle, Sandhya's younger brother, Bindu's husband, Rocky's father and Bantu's adoptive father (2021)
- Sonia Singh as Bindu Sidhwani: Ranjeet's wife, Rocky's mother and Bantu's adoptive mother (2021)
- Aleya Ghosh as Yakshika: A Yakshini, Veer's spy-turned friend (2021)
- Viral Yadav as Sub-Inspector Abeer: Aditi's subordinate (2021)
- Papia Sengupta as CM Jaya Kadam: Chief Minister of Maharashtra (2021)
- Sunny Sadhwani as Charlie: Cook and servant at Sidhwani Mansion (2021)
- Tripti Bajoria as Styla: Sweeti and Meethi's manager (2021)
- Zahid Ali as Commissioner of Mumbai Police (2021)
- Yash Vatia as SI Mahal Deshpande: Aditi's subordinate (2021)

==== Guest appearances ====
- Gulki Joshi as SHO Haseena Malik (from Maddam Sir) (2021)
- Rakhi Sawant as Begum: A thief (2021)
- Kettan Singh as Badshah: A thief (2021)

== Production ==
=== Development ===
The series was announced by Peninsula Pictures in April 2020 and was confirmed in September 2020 by Sony SAB. The teaser of the series was released on 23 April 2020 and first look of the series was released on 24 November. On 19 August 2021, it was announced that the series would have a second season named "New Mode On", premiering on 23 August 2021.

=== Filming ===
The series went on a brief hiatus from 21 April 2021 due to COVID-19 lockdown in Maharashtra, during which the shooting base was moved from Mumbai to Surat. The series resumed broadcast of new episodes on 26 April 2021. From June onwards, as government permissions were given, the shooting returned to Mumbai.

== Crossover ==
The Big Shanivaar is crossover of all Sony SAB's on-going shows (except Taarak Mehta Ka Ooltah Chashmah) on 9 October 2021 to promote Sony SAB telecasting their shows on Saturday also.

The Big Shanivaar is crossover of all Sony SAB's on-going shows (except Taarak Mehta Ka Ooltah Chashmah) on 20 November 2021 on the occasion of Diwali in Parakram SAF and to help its Cadet Koel Roy in escaping from her husband.

== Awards and nominations ==
Year	Award	Category	Recipient	Result	Ref.
2022	Indian Television Academy Awards	Popular Actor - Drama	Abhishek Nigam	Nominated	
2022	Indian Television Academy Awards	Popular Show - Drama	Hero – Gayab Mode On	Nominated	

== See also ==
- List of programmes broadcast by Sony SAB
