= Baba Raghav Das =

Indian freedom fighter

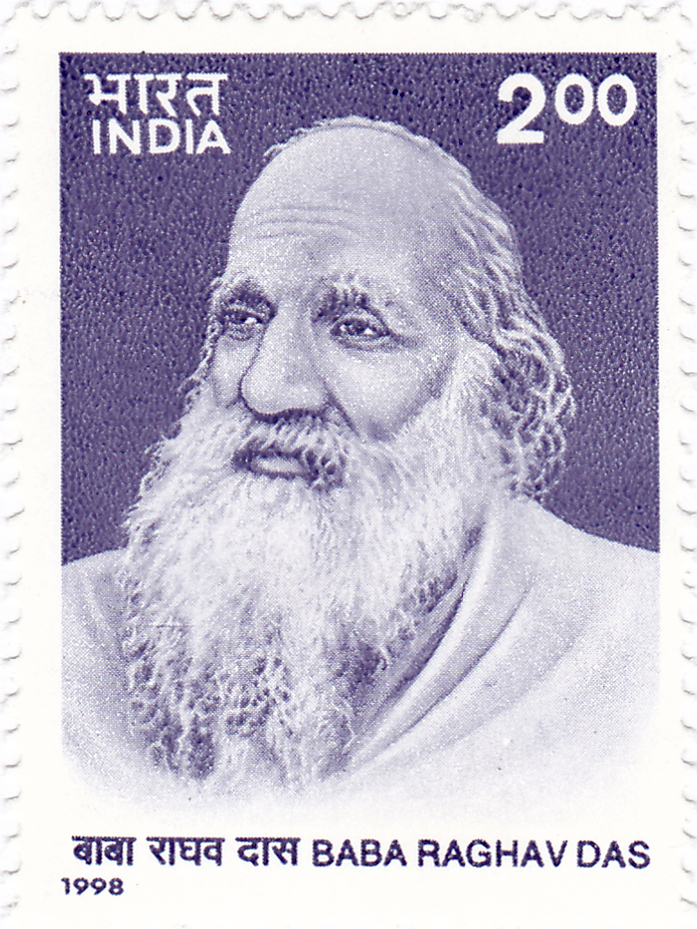
- Postage Stamp issued in honour of social works done by Baba Raghav Das on his birth anniversary in 1998

Personal life
- Born: Raghavendra; 12 December 1896 Pune, Maharashtra, India
- Died: 15 January 1958 (aged 61)
- Political party: Indian National Congress
- Occupation: Guru, freedom fighter, reformer, member of parliament, and activist

Religious life
- Religion: Hinduism

Baba Raghav Das (12 December 1896 – 15 January 1958), popularly known as the Gandhi of Poorvanchal, was an Indian guru, freedom fighter, reformer, philosopher, member of parliament, and an activist. He is best known for his social contributions. The government of India released a postage stamp in his honour in 1998.

== Life ==
Baba Raghav Das was born on 12 December 1896, to a rich Pachhapurkar Brahman family in Pune, Maharastra. He was the youngest of eight children and was named Raghavendra. His whole family died in the plague epidemic of 1902-1904. At the age of five, he was compelled to attend primary education in Mumbai. In 1913, after his education in Mumbai, he left the city in search of a Siddha Guru. He roamed various places, including Kashi but to no avail. He then went to Ghazipur, where he met 'Mauni Baba' and learned Hindi from him. He later accepted 'Yogiraj Anant Mahaprabhu' as his guru. After this he became the successor of the Gaadi (Seat) of Anant Mahaprabhu and founded the Paramhansh Ashram at Barhaj.

In 1921, Mahatma Gandhi visited Ghorakhpur where he met Raghav Das. From that point on, Raghav Das joined the Indian Independence Movement and continuously worked for the independence of India and served the oppressed people of India. Gandhi addressed Raghav Das as "Baba Raghavdas", and he became popular as Baba Raghavdas. Gandhi said that "gaining freedom for India would be easier if more saints like Raghavdas joined them".

During 1923–1924, Gandhi insisted that keeping some amount of hand spun Khadi was a pre-qualification of membership in the Indian National Congress. Though Raghavdas himself spun the charkha, he originally opposed this idea but later agreed.

Raghavdas was imprisoned many times for his activities in the Indian Independence Movement, the first being in 1921. His activities in the Independence movement included accompanying Gandhi during the Dandi March (the Salt March). Raghavdas' Ashram in Barah was the epicenter of independence activities including the provision of shelter for many freedom fighters. He was very closely associated with Ram Prasad Bismil and after Ram Prasad's execution, Raghavdas erected a memorial to him at the Ashram. He arranged a public meeting to spread awareness about the independence movement and social reforms. He went to settlements of Dalit people and served the sick while teaching them about cleanliness. He preferred to serve people directly rather than joining the government.

== 1948 by-elections ==
In 1948, 13 MLAs from UP legislative assembly, who had socialistic leanings resigned from Congress. This resulted in by-elections at all 13 seats. Ayodhya - then known as Faizabad - became a hot seat in the by-election. From here, socialist thinker Acharya Narendra Dev was in the fray. He was among the socialist MLAs who had resigned. Defeating him became a challenge for Congress. In order to defeat him, Congress fielded Baba Raghav Das. One of his promises was that he would free Ram Janmabhoomi from heretics. In the by-election, Acharya Narendra Dev got 4,080 votes while Raghav Das got 5,392 votes. Das thus won by 1,312 votes.

== Opposing unethical taxation ==
When the government imposed a tax on the oil mill crusher Kolhu, Raghavdas opposed the measure, citing Kolhu as a source of employment for poor and oppressed people and in protest resigned from the Legislative Assembly. Ultimately, the government did abolish the tax on Kolhu. After that, he continued to work for the poor and oppressed people of India.

== Social activities ==
From 1947 to 1958, he dedicated himself to various welfare activities, playing an active part in the Bhoodan Movement started by Vinoba Bhave. He believed that the importance of Independence could only be instilled in people through education, so he established several of educational institutions, notably in Deoria, Barhaj, and Kushinagar. Imparting education and maintaining hygiene and public healthcare were his main priorities. He started Shree Krishna Inter College and Sarojini Balika Vidyalaya as well as a Sanskrit College in his Ashram's premises. He was sympathetic to the sufferings of people afflicted by leprosy and, inspired by Gandhi, established a Leper House at Gorakhpur and Mairwa Bihar. He died on 15 January 1958.

== Recognition ==
- In 1998, on Baba Raghavdas' birth anniversary the government of India released a postage stamp in honor of social works done by him
- Institutions named after Baba Raghav Das
  - Baba Raghav Das Medical College, Gorakhpur
  - Baba Raghavdas Inter College, Deoria
  - Baba Raghav Das Postgraduate College, Deoria
  - Baba Raghavdas Post Graduate College, Barahaj
  - Raghavdas Park, Barhaj
  - BRD Inter Collage Bhatpar Rani Deoria
  - BRD Girls School Bhatpar rani.
- In 2024 DD National's serial Swaraj Included a full episode on Baba Raghav Das.
