= Rudramadevi (TV series) =

Indian historical action television series

- Genre: Historical drama
- Based on: Life of Rani Rudrama Devi
- Developed by: Deepam Chatterjee; Udaya Bhaskar; Alind Srivastava; Nissar Parwej
- Written by: Sakthi Sagar Chopra; Lakshmi Jaya Kumar; Udaya Bhaskar(Dialogues)
- Story by: Anjali Bahura; Tapasya Udyavar
- Directed by: Santosh Badal
- Creative director: Suraj Rao
- Starring: See below
- Theme music composer: Lenin Nandi
- Composer: Nakul Abhyankar
- Country of origin: India
- Original language: Telugu
- No. of seasons: 1
- No. of episodes: 100

Production
- Producers: Alind Srivastava; Nissar Parvez
- Cinematography: Kunal V. Kadam
- Editors: Ganga Kacharla; Moghul Swaleha Begh
- Camera setup: Multi camera
- Running time: 21 min
- Production company: Peninsula Pictures

Original release
- Network: Star Maa
- Release: 18 January – 26 May 2021

Rudramadevi – Saatileni Maharaju is a Telugu-language historical drama television series that airs on Star Maa. The series is based on the life of Rani Rudrama Devi. The show is produced by Alind Srivastava and Nissar Parvez under the banner Peninsula Pictures. The show started airing from 18 January 2021 on Star Maa and also available digitally on Disney+ Hotstar. The series is written by Sakthi Sagar Chopra and Lakshmi Jaya Kumar. It is one of the expensive Telugu television series. Ananya Dwivedi portrayed the Young Rudrama Devi, with Anand playing the character Ganapati Devudu.

== Synopsis ==
The story opens in 13th century where the Kakatiyas are ruling the Orugallu land. Its king is Ganapati Devudu who had gone to war with other kingdom. Somulladevi/ Somamba the queen of the kingdom is pregnant and hopes high of bearing a baby boy, the heir of the kingdom.

Tirumala Devi, sister of Somamba pretends to be nice but plots against her with her brother and her brother's wife Sumati only to make her son Viswanath king of the kingdom and she herself becomes Rajmata. Ganapathidevudu is a very kind and modest king but he continuously sees a girl in the war whereas a chained woman predicts that a girl will be born for Ganapatidevudu and Somulladevi.

Goons attack Somamba but she manages to escape and finally, Somamba gives birth to a healthy baby girl whereas Sumati Devi's family astrologer predicts that it is a girl. Tirumala, Hari Hara dev, Murari Dev try their level best to know whether it is a girl or a boy but soon Kalluri(family astrologer) kills himself. (actually it is not a suicide, he is killed by Rajguru and Mandakini) and leaves a suicide note behind conveying them that it is a boy and he killed himself because he felt guilty as he did not lie in his whole life.

10 years later:

Rudradevudu, a kind and helpful one was brought up by Ganapathi Dev with warrior skills. Tirumala devi continuously attacks Rudra but she manages to escape. Later, she goes to Gurukula to study and qualifies in the Gurukul entrance test. Her wedding is arranged with Ganapati Devudu's friend's daughter but Somulladevi opposes it as she cannot accept a girl marrying a girl.

Tirumala devi's son Vishwa tries to frame Rudrudu of theft but Veerabhadra and Gona ganna reddy [Rudrudu's friends] manipulates Vishwa into saying the truth to their guru gnaneshwar. Tirumala tries to poison Rudra's drink but fails.

== Cast ==
=== Main ===
- Ananya Dwivedi as Rudramadevi / Rudra Deva: Ganapati Deva and Somamba's daughter; Ganapambha's elder sister; Right at birth, Ganapati deva announced his daughter Rudramadevi as male child Rudra Deva (2021)
- Anand as Ganapati Deva: Somamba's husband; Rudramadevi (or) Rudradeva and Ganapambha's father; Rajamatha's son; Harihara Deva and Murari Deva's brother; King of Kakatiya dynasty (2021)
- Rathi Arumugam as Somamba / Somula Devi: Ganapati Deva's wife; Rudramadevi (or) Rudradeva and Ganapambha's mother; The queen of Kakatiya dynasty (2021)
- Amrita Gowri Raj as Tirumala Devi: Harihara Deva's wife; Vishwa's mother; Acting as a trusted daughter-in-law of Royal family, Tirumala devi wants the kingdom for herself and her son Vishwa (2021)
- Sridhar Rao as Murari Deva: Sumathi's husband; Amaravathi's father; Rajamatha's son; Ganapathi Deva and Harihara Deva's brother; He wants the kingdom for himself (2021)
- Sundeep Ved as Harihara Deva: Tirumala Devi's husband; Vishwa's father; He has speech impediment and he is an alcoholic (2021)
- Abhinav Singh Raghav as Prasadaditya: Trusted Commander of Kakatiya dynasty Army (2021)
- Jaya Kavi as Sumathi: Murarideva's wife; Amaravathi's mother (2021)

=== Recurring ===
- Udesha as Madakini; She is a servant to Harihara deva but is later revealed to be a spy (2021)
- Hansik Jammula as Chalukya Veera Bhadra; Rudramadevi (or) Rudradeva's friend who is so talented and strong (2021–present) later her husband
- Amit Sinha as Kalluri; Sumati's astrologer (2021)
- Shirley as Raja Matha; The queen mother of Kakatiya dynasty; Ganapatideva, Harihara Deva and Murari Deva's mother; Rudramadevi (or) Rudradeva, Vishwa, Ganapambha and Amaravathi's paternal grandmother; She is the strict person who is stereotypical and is partial towards male heirs. When she learns that Rudradeva is a boy, she wanted Ganapathi Deva to remarry for Male heir. (2021–present)
- Durga Prasad as Gopala; Harihara Deva's sidekick (2021–present)
- Gundra Srinivas Reddy as Gnaneshwara Deekshitulu; Rudramadevi (or) Rudradeva's teacher in his Gurukul (2021–present)
- Moukthika Sharma as Ganapamba: Ganapathi Deva and Somamba's daughter; Rudramadevi (or) Rudradeva's younger sister (2021–present)
- Mannan as Vishweshwara Deva "Vishwa": Harihara Deva and Tirumala's son; The cunning boy who is jealous of Rudramadevi (or) Rudradeva (2021–present)
- Siya Makwana as Amaravati: Murarideva and Sumathi's daughter; Rudramadevi (or) Rudradeva's cousin (2021–present)
- Rohan Jadhav as Gona Ganna Reddy: Rudramadevi (or) Rudra's friend in the Gurukul (2021–present)
- Soham Jadhav as Mahadeva: Prince of Yadava kingdom and Rudramadevi (or) Rudradeva's arch rival (2021–present)
- Viraaj Modgil as Amba Deva: Student of Gurukul (2021–present)

== Production ==
The series was launched in November 2020 and released a promotional teaser in early December 2020. The serial ended on 26 May 2021.
