= Vikas Grover =

Indian television actor

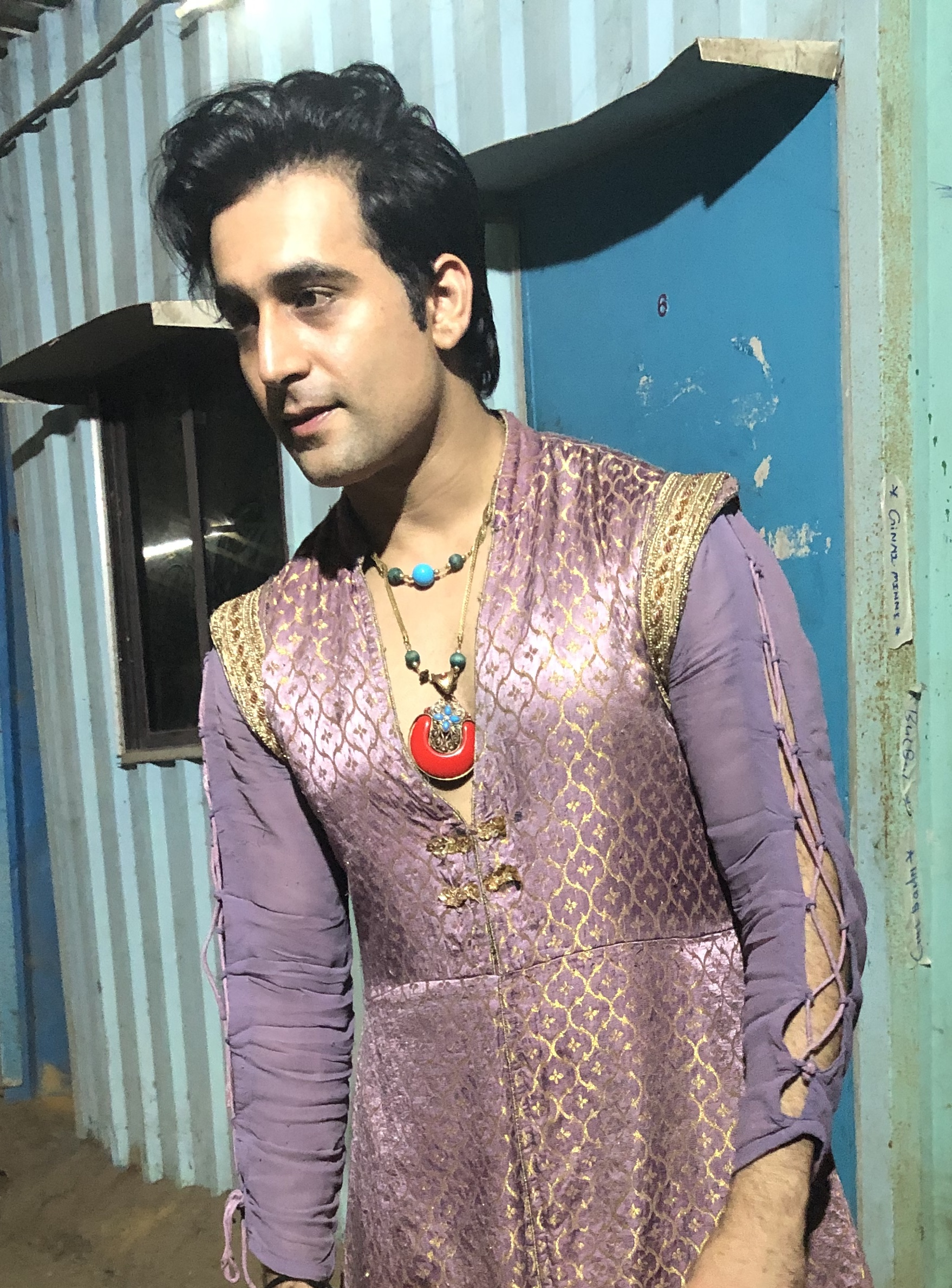
- Vikas Grover in 2019
- Born: Vikas Grover; 15 March 1989 (age 37); Delhi, India
- Occupation: Actor
- Years active: 2010–present
- Known for: Aladdin - Naam Toh Suna Hoga

Vikas Grover is an Indian actor who is known for his roles in the Sony SAB's show Aladdin – Naam Toh Suna Hoga as the role of Gulbadan. and Devrishi Narada in Sankat Mochan Mahabali Hanumaan.

He has also started in many other television series namely Beintehaa, Jeet Gayi Toh Piya Morey, Yam Hain Hum, Tu Sooraj Main Saanjh, Piyaji and Maaya 2. He played the role of Harry Khatri in Wagle Ki Duniya – Nayi Peedhi Naye Kissey.

== Television ==
Year	Serial	Role	Channel	Notes	Ref(s)
2013	Amita Ka Amit	Suraj	Sony Entertainment Television		
2013	Jeannie Aur Juju	Jackie	Sony SAB		
2014	Beintehaa	Rizwan	Colors TV		
2015	Sankat Mochan Mahabali Hanumaan	Devrishi Narada	Sony Entertainment Television		
2015	Yam Hain Hum	Chunky	Sony SAB		
2015	SuperCops Vs SuperVillains	Rahul	Life OK	Episodic Role (Episode – The Lizard Monstar)	
2016	Suhani Si Ek Ladki	Aditya	Star Plus		
2017	Tu Sooraj Main Saanjh, Piyaji	Arvind	Star Plus		
2017–2018	Jeet Gayi Toh Piya Morey	Mukund Rajawat	Zee TV		
2018–2020	Aladdin – Naam Toh Suna Hoga	Gulbadan	Sony SAB		
2020	Shaurya Aur Anokhi Ki Kahani	Vicky	Star Plus		
2021–2022	Balika Vadhu 2	Vikrant	Colors TV		
2022–2024	Wagle Ki Duniya – Nayi Peedhi Naye Kissey	Harry Khatri	Sony SAB		
2023	Shravani	Sharad Thakur	Shemaroo Umang		
2023–2024	Pandya Store	Sandeep	Star Plus		
2024	Main Hoon Saath Tere	Sadhu	Zee TV		
2024–2025	Iss Ishq Ka Rabb Rakha	Harman Singh Bajwa	Star Plus		
2026	Ishq Junooni		Dangal		
