= Muskurahat (1992 film) =

- Poster
- Directed by: Priyadarshan
- Written by: Dialogues: Suraj Sanim
- Screenplay by: Bhushan Vanmali
- Story by: Priyadarshan
- Produced by: Pranlal Mehta
- Starring: Jay Mehta; Revathi; Amrish Puri; Anil Dhawan; Jagdeep; Annu Kapoor; Sharat Saxena; Anju Mahendru lyrics - Suraj Sanim
- Cinematography: S. Kumar
- Edited by: N. Gopalakrishnan
- Music by: Songs: Raamlaxman; Background Score: S.P. Venkatesh
- Production company: Prathima Films
- Release date: 30 October 1992
- Running time: 135 minutes
- Language: Hindi

Muskurahat (transl. Smile) is a 1992 Indian Hindi-language comedy-drama film directed by Priyadarshan, starring Jay Mehta, Revathi, Amrish Puri, Anil Dhawan, Sharat Saxena, Annu Kapoor and Jagdeep. It is a remake of Priyadarshan's own Malayalam film Kilukkam. It was initially supposed to star Aamir Khan and Pooja Bhatt.

== Plot ==
Gopichand Verma is a retired Judge of the Supreme Court of India settled in Ooty. He is estranged from his family for a very long time & lives separately. He is in touch with his son & son-in-law KC, who are assigned to maintain the vast estate of Gopichand. Both of them are good for nothing & depend on the earnings of Gopichand.

Once in a while, he meets Gopal Shrivastava, who is the son of Justice Shrivastava, who mentored Gopichand from a simple canteen boy to position of Supreme Court Justice. Gopichand has high respect for Justice Shrivastava & considers Gopal as his younger brother.

Pritam a young lad, is close to him as he is the son of his late friend. Pritam works as a guide & lives with his friend is Jagan. One day Nandini lands in Ooty and Pritam befriends her and becomes her guide, but later he finds out that Nandini is mad.

He is forced to take care of her as there is no other option. First Jagan is very angry with her antics but reconciles as soon as he discovers that there is a cash prize declared for anyone who notifies whereabouts to the mental asylum from where she has run away. What Jagan discovers is that the prize money is increased significantly with every passing week. He plans to hide her for a couple of weeks before they can claim the prize money. Pritam is assigned to take care of Nandini & they take her to a relatively isolated & abandoned bungalow. One fine day few goons get whiff of Nandini's whereabouts & land up at the bungalow. Pritam rescues her in nick of time. This incident shakes her badly & she tells Pritam that she is sane. She narrates her ordeal as an orphan child spending most of her life in boarding school. Initially, Gopichand uses to secretly visit her school & leave her a box of chocolates & a letter. Later he stopped coming, but diligently use to send her a box of chocolates & a letter every month. After she crosses her teenage, he deposits a large sum for her in a bank & from that point, there are no more letters.

Nandini is curious to meet Gopichand whom she thinks is her father & decides to meet her. She somehow lands up at home of family. His family is very cordial & treats her well. Later in the day, she is given drug-laced tea & she falls unconscious & next thing she remembers is that she is in the mental asylum. Gopichand's son & son-in-law believe that Nadini's return to their life would make Gopichand hand over his wealth to her & also there is a general disregard for her in the family because she is an illegitimate child of his.

After this Pritam decides to help Nandini & takes her to Gopichand's home as he is the only person where no goons or any of his family members would dare to step into. As Gopichand had not seen her for a long time he is not able to recognize her. Pritam narrates that she has just lost her family, so he brought her here for maid's job.

Nandini finds very hard to get along with Gopichand as he is a hard taskmaster. She tries a lot of things to get closer to him, but everything in vain. Meanwhile, his family members are very worried that Nandini has reached his home & make schemes to get rid of her from his life. One fine day Gopichand injures himself & is bedridden. At this point, daughter-father love kindles & Nandini takes good care of him. This completely changes Gopichand's heart & he transforms into a very jovial person. A few days later the entire family barges into his home & there is a showdown amongst them. Nandini decides to leave the place because she is sad to see the family members fighting amongst themselves because of her. Once out of safe haven of Gopichand, she is again attacked by goons sent by KC. Pritam is able to rescue her again. Later in the night he goes in a drunken state to Gopichand's home & throws abuses at everyone for trying to kill Nandini.

The next day, Gopichand invites everyone (Pritam, Nandini, Gopal, Maya) to his home. He narrates that it is time to take to trail the case which was weighing down on his conscious for a long time. Long time back, Maya narrates to Gopichand that Gopal has cheated on her by hiding the fact that he is married & now she is pregnant with his child. Gopichand has a word with Gopal, but Gopal is very unapologetic about the affair as he thinks that in the consensual relationship there is nothing unethical. Gopichand although very angry with Gopal, leaves him alone because he is under the burden of his father's legacy. Later he takes Maya to a hill station & there Nandini is born. He keeps this a secret from everyone & takes the responsibility for Nandini. His family thinks that she is his illegitimate child & there is a tiff amongst them. Gopichand leaves his family but does not compromise with his responsibility.

Both Maya & Gopal reconcile & accept Nandini as their daughter. Nandini, however, is distraught & cannot come to terms with 2 strangers claiming to be her parents. She considers Gopichand as her father as he was the only person who cared for her. Gopichand also accepts her as her daughter & everyone reconciles. Gopichand decides that he will now stay with his family & surprise Pritam by offering Nandini's hand to him.

== Cast ==
- Jay Mehta as Pritam
- Revathi as Nandini
- Amrish Puri as Former Justice Gopichand Verma
- Anil Dhawan as Gopal Srivastava
- Nilima Deshpande as Doctor Saab
- Jagdeep as Badriprasad Chaurasia
- Mahesh Anand as K.C., Verma's son-in-law
- Arif Khan as Verma's son
- Uma Riyaz Khan as Verma's Daughter
- Asha Sharma as Mrs. Gopichand Verma
- Annu Kapoor as Jagan
- Lalita Pawar as Laundry lady
- Sharat Saxena as Samar Khan
- Anju Mahendru as Mayadevi, Verma's sister
- Kim as an item number
- Lalita Pawar as Old lady living on Verma's lands

== Soundtrack ==
#	Title	Singer(s)
1	"Gun Gun Karta Aaya Bhanwra"	Kumar Sanu, Sadhana Sargam
2	"Banda Nawaz Izzat Nawaz"	Kumar Sanu, Sadhana Sargam
3	"Apni Jeb Mein Lakhon Honge"	Udit Narayan, Kavita Krishnamurthy, M. G. Sreekumar
4	"Soja Soja Chandni"	M. G. Sreekumar
5	"Apne Dil Mein Ae Logo"	Udit Narayan
6	"Phool Ki Patti Sa Tan Iska"	Udit Narayan, Alka Yagnik
