= Pehchaan (2009 TV series) =

- Also known as: Pehchaan - Astitva Ki Talaash
- Genre: Drama
- Created by: Baanyan Tree Entertainment
- Directed by: Shyam Maheshwari
- Starring: Richa Soni; Amit Pachori
- Opening theme: Pehchaan
- Country of origin: India
- Original language: Hindi
- No. of seasons: 1

Production
- Executive producers: Gurudutt Revankar; Shishir Shah
- Producers: Poorva Gokhale; Gautam Chaturvedi
- Camera setup: Multi-camera
- Running time: 27-29 minutes

Original release
- Network: DD National
- Release: 2008 – 2009

Pehchaan is a drama series airs on DD National channel on every Monday - Friday at 2:30pm IST. The series is produced Baanyan Tree Media & Entertainment' and have received good Television Point Ratings after few weeks of its launch.

== Cast ==
- Richa Soni as Tanvi
- Amit Pachori
- Daisy Irani
- Zarina Wahab
- Deepak Parashar
- Kulbir Kaur
- Suchitra Bandekar
- Neha Bam
- Priya Shinde as Simran
- Rinku Karmarkar as Kajri Mausi
- Aashish Kaul as Sameer
- Shweta Gautam as Shyama
- Ashok Pandey
- Amrita Sant
- Suruchi Adarkar as Vidya
- Kanchan Gupta
- Mukesh Dhasmana
- Aijaz Ashfaq
- Shahab Khan
- Rajeev Bhardwaj as Subash
- Megha Dhade
- Kruttika Sharma as Sweety
