= Peninsula Pictures =

Indian production company

Peninsula Pictures Pvt. Ltd
- Type: Privately held company
- Industry: Entertainment
- Genre: Entertainment
- Founded: 2015
- Founder: Alind Srivastava; Nissar Parvej
- Headquarters: Mumbai, Maharashtra, India
- Area served: India
- Key people: Alind Srivastava; Nissar Parvej; Nupur Barua
- Products: Television series
- Website: Peninsula Pictures

Peninsula Pictures is an Indian company that produces television series and entertainment content. The company was founded in the year 2015 by Alind Srivastava and Nissar Parvej and the head office is located in Andheri West, Mumbai.

The company has produced shows for General Entertainment Channels (GECs) like Hastinapur Ke Veer (Sony SAB), Divya Prem - Pyaar aur Rahasya Ki Kahaani (Sun Neo), Aladdin - Naam Toh Suna Hoga (Sony SAB), Hero gayab mode on (Sony SAB), Paramavatar Shri Krishna (&TV), Vikram Betaal Ki Rahasya Gatha (&TV), Mayavi Maling (STAR Bharat), Dev (Colors TV), Dev Season 2 (Colors TV), Vishkanya (Zee TV) , Kahat Hanuman Jai Shree Ram (&TV), Ganesh Kartikey (Sony SAB), Vish (Colors TV), Rudramadevi (Star Maa), Paapnashini Ganga (Ishara TV), Nima Denzongpa (Colors TV), Jai Hanuman – Sankatmochan Naam Tiharo (Dangal TV), Ali Baba (Sony SAB), Suhangan Chudali (Colors TV), Noyontara (Colors TV), Gharwali Pedwali (&TV).

== Productions ==
Premiere	Title	Channel
16 June 2025	Divya Prem: Pyaar aur Rahasya Ki Kahaani	Sun Neo
2 June 2026	Hastinapur Ke Veer	Sony SAB

Year	Show	Channel	Episode
2016	Vishkanya Ek Anokhi Prem Kahani	Zee TV	143
2017	Dev	Colors TV	27
2017–2020	Paramavatar Shri Krishna	&TV	673
2018	Mayavi Maling	Star Bharat	95
2018	Dev – Season 2	Colors TV	44
2018–2021	Aladdin – Naam Toh Suna Hoga	Sony SAB	572
2018–2019	Vikram Betaal Ki Rahasya Gatha	&TV	157
2019	Vish	Colors TV	80
2020–2021	Hero – Gayab Mode On	Sony SAB	236
2020	Kahat Hanuman Jai Shree Ram	&TV	120
2021	Rudramadevi – Saatileni Maharaju	Star Maa	100
2021	Paapnaashini Ganga	Ishara TV	83
2021–2022	Nima Denzongpa	Colors TV	270
2022	Jai Hanuman - Sankat Mochan Naam Tiharo	Dangal	89
2022–2023	Ali Baba	Sony SAB	239
2024	Suhagan Chudail	Colors TV	69
2025–2026	Gatha Shiv Parivaar Ki — Ganesh Kartikey	Sony SAB	156
2025–2026	Noyontara	Colors TV	312
2025–2026	Gharwali Pedwali	&TV	120

== Award and recognition ==
Show	Award	Category	Nominees	Result
Dev	17th Indian Television Academy Awards 2017	Best Actor- Drama	Ashish Chaudhary	Nominated
Dev	17th Indian Television Academy Awards 2017	Best Thriller (Horror Show)	Alind Srivastava; Nissar Parvej	Won
Paramavatar Shri Krishna	17th Indian Television Academy Awards 2017	Best Child Artist	Mahi Soni	Nominated
Dev	17th Indian Television Academy Awards 2017	Best mini -series	Alind Srivastava; Nissar Parvej	Nominated
Paramavatar Shri Krishna	17th Indian Television Academy Awards 2017	Best Visual Effects	Chirag Bhuva	Nominated
Aladdin - Naam Toh Suna Hoga	Zee Rishtey Awards 2018	Outstanding show on another channel	Alind Srivastava; Nissar Parvej	Won
Dev Season-2	18th Indian Television Academy Awards 2018	Best Actor in supporting role	Amit Dolawat	Nominated
Aladdin - Naam Toh Suna Hoga	18th Indian Television Academy Awards 2018	Best Actress in supporting role	Smita Mohla	Nominated
Paramavatar Shri Krishna	18th Indian Television Academy Awards 2018	Best Negative role	Manish Wadhwa As Kans	Nominated
Paramavatar Shri Krishna	18th Indian Television Academy Awards 2018	Best Mythological / Historical show	Alind Srivastava; Nissar Parvej	Nominated
Dev Season-2	18th Indian Television Academy Awards 2018	Best Thriller/ Horror show	Alind Srivastava; Nissar Parvej	Won
Aladdin - Naam Toh Suna Hoga	18th Indian Television Academy Awards 2018	Best Costume	Nidhi Yasha	Won
Aladdin - Naam Toh Suna Hoga	18th Indian Television Academy Awards 2018	Best Actor in Negative role	Aamir Dalvi As Zafar	Won
Aladdin - Naam Toh Suna Hoga	Gold's Award	Best debutant	Avneet Kaur	Won
Aladdin - Naam Toh Suna Hoga	19th Indian Television Academy Awards 2019	Best Actor in Negative role	Aamir Dalvi As Zafar	Won
Aladdin - Naam Toh Suna Hoga		Best Fantasy / Historical show	Aladdin - Naam Toh Suna Hoga	Won
Paramavatar Shri Krishna	19th Indian Television Academy Awards 2019	Best Child Artist	Mahi Soni	Won
