= Richa Soni =

Indian television actress

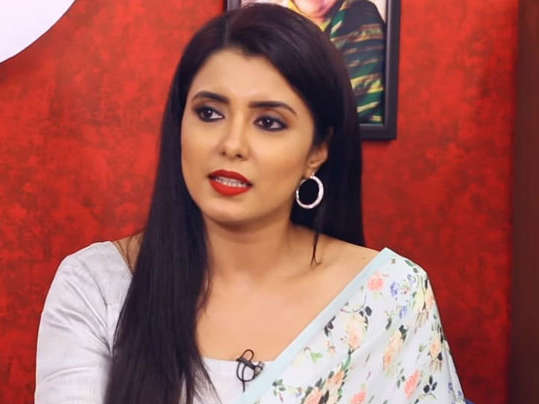
- Soni in 2019
- Born: India
- Occupation: Actress
- Years active: 2007 - present
- Spouse: Jigar Ali Sumbhaniya (m. 2019)

Richa Soni is an Indian television actress. She made her debut in Shararat. She is known for her role as Bindiya in ColorTV's daily soap Bhagyavidhaata . She has also appeared in shows like, Nachle Ve With Saroj Khan - Season 2, Badalte Rishton Ki Dastaan, Jaat Ki Jugni and Siya Ke Ram. She has also done short films like The Silent Statue which was showcased at the Cannes Film Festival and she also won the Award for "Best Actress in the Short Films Category" in the 2nd Jharkhand International Film Festival 2019. The short film Seasoned with Love premiered on Hungama Play on 16 April 2019.

== Personal life ==
Soni is a Bengali, born and brought up in Muzaffarpur city in Bihar, from where she did her schooling and college education. She then moved to Mumbai.

Soni married businessman Jigar Ali Sumbhaniya in February 2019 following Bengali Hindu and Muslim rituals in two separate ceremonies.

== Filmography ==
=== Television ===
Year	Title	Role	Notes	Ref.
2007	Shararat			
2008	Raavan	Chitrangada		
2009	Kashmakash Zindagi Ki	Kamya		
2009	Pehchaan	Tanvi		
2009–2011	Bhagyavidhaata	Bindya		
2011	C.I.D.			
2011	Jamuniya			
2012	SuperCops Vs Super Villains	Juhi	Episode 8	
2013	Badalte Rishton Ki Dastaan	Shama Akhil Asthana		
2015	Siya Ke Ram	Gargi		
2016	Crime Patrol	Vrinda Desai		
2016	Aadha Full	Roshini		
2017	Jaat Ki Jugni	Savita Gajender Singh Ahlawat		
2018	Muskaan	Rakhi Das		
2019	Choti Sarrdaarni	DSP Tara Singh Chautala		
2021–2022	Sasural Genda Phool 2	Rajni Indrabhan Kashyap		
2023	Bekaboo	Deepa aka Nakabposh		
2024–2025	Shaitani Rasmein	Sumitra Ghelot		
2025–2026	Gharwali Pedwali	Reetu Pandey		
2026–present	Hastinapur Ke Veer	Radha		

=== Films ===
- Achal Rahe Suhag
- Adugu
