= Madirakshi Mundle =

Indian television actress

- Occupation: Actress
- Years active: 2015–present
- Spouse: Bharadwaj Mundle (m. 2015)

Madirakshi Mundle is an Indian television actress. She has made her acting debut with 2015 Telugu film Ori Devudoy where she played the lead role Amrutha. She made her television debut as Sita in Siya Ke Ram. In 2019, she was seen in Star Bharat's Jag Janani Maa Vaishno Devi – Kahani Mata Rani Ki as Mahalakshmi.

== Career ==
Mundle made her acting debut in 2015 with Telugu movie Ori Devudoy where she portrayed as Amrutha. In the same year, she made her Telivision debut with Siya Ke Ram as Sita opposite Ashish Sharma. The show proved to be a major turning point in her career and brought her recognition.

She then played the timid and shy Jat girl Munni Singh Ahlawat Dahiya in Jaat Ki Jugni in 2017. This was followed by Roopmati "Roop" in Tera Baap Mera Baap in 2018. For the next three years she played various mythological roles on Telivision including Mahalakshmi in Jag Janani Maa Vaishno Devi – Kahani Mata Rani Ki, Parvati in Vighnaharta Ganesha and reprising the role of Sita in Jai Hanuman – Sankatmochan Naam Tiharo. In 2024, she played the negative lead Shaina Raghuvanshi in Qayaamat Se Qayaamat Tak.

Since June 2026, Mundle returned to television with StarPlus's Sairaab opposite Rohit Chandel and later opposite Krishna Kaul. She portrayed Dr. Nayanika Roy till the show went off air in 22 September 2026.

== Personal life ==
Mundle shares little about her personal life. In an interview, she revealed that she married Bharadwaj Mundle in June 2015.

== Filmography ==
=== Films ===
Year	Title	Role	Notes	Ref.
2015	Ori Devudoy	Amrutha	Telugu film	

=== Television ===
Year	Title	Role	Ref.
2015–2016	Siya Ke Ram	Sita/Mahalakshmi	
2017	Jaat Ki Jugni	Munni Singh Ahlawat Dahiya	
2018	Tera Baap Mera Baap	Roopmati "Roop"	
2019–2020	Jag Janani Maa Vaishno Devi – Kahani Mata Rani Ki	Mahalakshmi	
2020–2021	Vighnaharta Ganesha	Parvati	
2022	Jai Hanuman – Sankatmochan Naam Tiharo	Sita	
2024	Qayaamat Se Qayaamat Tak	Shaina Raghuvanshi	
2026	Sairaab	Dr. Nayanika Roy Ganguly	
