= Jeet Gayi Toh Piya Morey =

- Genre: Indian soap opera
- Created by: Jay Mehta, Kinnari Mehta
- Written by: S. Manasvi
- Directed by: Amit Gupta; Randip Mahadik; Neeraj Panday
- Country of origin: India
- Original language: Hindi
- No. of episodes: 238

Production
- Executive producer: Ranjan Jenaa
- Producer: Jay Mehta
- Production location: Mumbai
- Camera setup: Multi Camera
- Running time: 21 minutes
- Production company: Jay Production

Original release
- Network: Zee TV
- Release: 21 August 2017 – 23 July 2018

Jeet Gayi Toh Piya Morey (English: I'm on the edge) is an Indian Hindi romantic drama television series, which premiered on 21 August 2017 and was broadcast on Zee TV. The series was produced by Jay Production of Jay Mehta. The series ended on 23 July 2018. it replaced Sethji.

== Plot ==
The series follows the story of Devi Chauhan, who is married into a rival family by force. Devi lost her parents at a young age, and was raised by her uncle, Bharat Chauhan, and her aunt, Rekha Chauhan. She has been raised in the city away from her family due to a threat in her village. When she comes back to her village to surprise her family, she is seen by Adhiraj Rajawat, a rich boy from her rival family. She slaps him, and he then becomes obsessed with her. He forcefully marries Devi and reveals he did it for revenge.

Her new husband resents her but she resolves to win him over and bring out his otherwise hidden kindhearted nature. She eventually succeeds, but some problems arise in their marital life. Devi's mother-in-law (i.e. Adhiraj's mother), Heera Rajawat "Maasa" (Roopa Diavitia), does not like Devi at all and Urmi Rajawat, Adhiraj's widowed sister-in-law (i.e. Adhiraj's late step-brother's wife), is always trying to win Adhiraj’s affections.

Adhiraj gives Devi a divorce after a big misunderstanding, and Maasa promises Kesari to marry her to Adhiraj. At the wedding, Adhiraj marries Devi instead of Kesari, and Kesari vows to get revenge. Eventually, Devi gets pregnant but Maasa kills Adhiraj. It is revealed that Maasa is Adhiraj's stepmother and only wants his money. Devi gives birth to a baby girl and Maasa also attempts to kill her and her child by throwing the baby off a cliff.

=== 25 Years Later ===
The show takes a 25-year leap and focuses on Devi and Adhiraj's daughter, Devika Rajawat, who is alive and looks just like Devi. Maasa asks Devika to pose as Devi and Adhiraj's daughter in order to get Adhiraj's properties, not knowing she is in fact their daughter. In Adhiraj's will, it states that Adhiraj's child has to have been married for at least six months in order to obtain his money and properties.

Maasa brings Varun Babbar, a small time actor, to pose as a prince and marry Devika. When Devika finds out Varun's truth, she angrily breaks her engagement with him although Varun has fallen in love with Devika. Devika gets engaged to another man, who turns out to be bad and only wants Devika physically. In order to stop Devika from marrying the wrong guy, Varun marries Devika. After a lot of trouble, Devika and Varun finally fall in love and get married again.

While they were creating their love story, Dhaani Rajawat (Sakshi Sharma), Devika's cousin sister (i.e. Kesari and Mukund's daughter), also falls in love with Varun, and wants him at all costs. Kesari, who had lost Adhiraj because of Devi, does not want Dhaani to face the same loss she did, so she stages an accident with Varun. In the accident, Varun loses his mental balance and starts to act like a child.

A doctor named Daksh Shergill falls in love with Devika and wants to marry her, despite her being married to Varun. Daksh first buys out the Rajawat Mansion and then makes a deal with Devika, that he will make Varun normal again, but she will have to marry him first. Daksh and Devika fulfill their ends of the bargain, and Varun is back to normal again.

Unfortunately, Varun forgets his memories of Devika and she takes a promise to win him over again. Dhaani tries to use Varun's memory loss to marry him. Devika vows to get him back. It is also revealed that Devi is still alive, but near the brink of death.

Devika and Varun get reunited, Dhaani is arrested for attempting to kill Devika and Maasa realises her bad deeds and asks for forgiveness from Devi for what she had done to her. Devi tells her she will only forgive her if she leaves the Rajawat Mansion so Maasa leaves. The show ends on a good note.

== Cast ==
=== Main cast ===
- Yesha Rughani in a dual role as
  - Devi Rajawat (nee Chauhan) - Adhiraj's wife, Devika's mother (2017–18)
  - Devika Babbar (nee Rajawat) - Adhiraj and Devi's daughter, Varun's wife (2018)
- Krip Suri as Adhiraj Rajawat - Devi's husband, Devika's father (2017–18)
- Roopa Divetia as Heera Rajawat (Maasa), Adhiraj and Mukund's step mother, Urmi's mother-in-law, Devi and Kesar's step mother-in-law, Devika and Dhaani's Choti Dadi (2017–18)
- Shoaib Ibrahim as Varun Babbar - Devika's husband (2018)
- Nisha Pareek as Kesari Mukund Rajawat, Adhiraj's Second Bhabhi, Mukund's wife, Dhaani's mother, Devika's Taiji (2017-2018)
- Sakshi Sharma as Dhaani Mukund Rajawat - Kesar and Mukund's daughter, Devika's cousin, Adhiraj's niece (2018)
- Vineet Kumar Chaudhary as Daksh Shergill (2018)

=== Recurring cast ===
- Vikas Grover as Mukund Rajawat, Adhiraj's elder brother, Devika's Tauji, Kesari's husband, Dhaani's father (Dead) (2017–18)
- Sapna Thakur as Urmi Rajawat, Adhiraj's Bhabhi, Heera's daughter-in-law, Wife of Adhiraj's Late Step-Brother, Devika and Dhaani's Step-Taiji (2017–18)
- Manorama Bhattishyam as Bansuri, Urmi's mother (2017–18)
- Ashish Kadian as Sharad Kapoor, Adhiraj's lawyer and friend (2017–18)
- Unknown as Bharat Chauhan, Devi's Uncle, Rekha's Husband, Krishika's Father (2017)
- Komal Sharma as Rekha Bharat Chauhan, Devi's aunt, Bharat's wife, Krishika's mother (2017)
- Sheetal Maulik as Ambika Chauhan, Devi's Aunt (2017)
- Mahira Khurana as Krishika Bharat Chauhan, Bharat and Rekha's daughter, Devi's cousin sister (2017)
- Sahil Uppal as Virat Chopra, Devi's best friend (2017–18)
- Shruti Gholap as Lajjo, Devika's adoptive mother (2018)
- Divya Bhatnagar as Basanti Babbar, Varun's mother (2018)

=== Guest appearance ===
- Sayantani Ghosh as a werewolf during SUPERHIT episode (2018)
