= Swaraj (TV series) =

Indian historical television series

- Also known as: Swaraj: Bharat ke Swatantrata Sangram Ki Samagra Gatha (Note: Svarāja : Bhārata kē svatantratā-saṅgrāma kī samagra gāṭhā स्वराज : भारत के स्वतन्त्रता-सङ्ग्राम की समग्र गाथा)
- Genre: Indian Revolutionaries
- Created by: Abhimanyu Singh
- Developed by: Abhimanyu Singh
- Country of origin: India
- Original language: Hindi
- No. of episodes: 75

Production
- Producers: Abhimanyu Singh; Dordarshan
- Camera setup: Multi-camera
- Running time: 22–30 minutes
- Production company: Contiloe Entertainment
- Budget: est. ₹50 - ₹70 crore

Original release
- Network: DD National
- Release: 14 August 2022 – 14 January 2024

Swaraj (transl. Self-rule) is an Indian historical TV series aired on DD National from 14 August 2022. With this serial, Doordarshan again tried to bring alive the tales of courage of more than 550 freedom fighters. It is a Government of India project and produced by Contiloe Pictures. It is Digitally Available on Amazon Prime Video.

It has been dubbed in English, Tamil, Telugu, Kannada, Malayalam, Marathi, Gujarati, Oriya, Bengali, Assamese and was broadcast on Doordarshan's regional channels from 20 August.

== Synopsis ==
The series showcases India's historical journey from 1498 when Vasco da Gama first reached India to 1947 when India achieved independence.

== Cast ==
=== Narrator ===
- Manoj Joshi (2022-2024)

=== Main cast ===
- Ashish Dixit as Birsa Munda
- Momin Zaidi as British Officer
- Hrishitaa Bhatt as Rani Lakshmibai
- Jason Shah as Vasco da Gama
- Gajendra Chauhan as Manvikram
- Barkha Bisht as Rani Abbakka
- Hemant Choudhary as Amar Singh
- Shruti Bisht as Queen Abbakka's daughter
- Arpit Ranka as Shivappa Nayaka
- Krip Suri as Marthanda Varma
- Meer Ali as Peshwa Bajirao
- Suhasi Dhami as Rani Velu Nachiyar
- Himanshu Malhotra as Veerapandiya Kattabomman
- Ankur Nayyar as Kerala Varma
- Megha Chakraborty as Devi Chaudrani
- Tabrez Khan as Bhawani Pathak
- Lavina Tandon as Hazrat Mahal
- Akshay Sethi as Sidhu Murmu
- Amit Dolawat as Kanhu Murmu
- Jason Tham as Narendrajit
- Karan Suchak as Mangal Pandey
- Rishiraj Pawar as Udmi Ram
- Farnaz Shetty as Avantibai
- Kapil Arya as Vasudev Balwant Phadke
- Shardul Pandit as Dhamodhar Hari Chapekar
- Namit Shah as Vasudev Hari Chapekar
- Teriya Magar as Young Rani Gaidinluu (16 years old)
- Ribbu mehra as Bhupendranath Datta
- Ankit Bathla as Batin Gosh
- Gaurav s Bajaj as Shyam Ji Krishna Verma
- Shwetha Munshi as Bhikaji Kama
- Rahul Sharma as Madan Lal Dhingra
- Achal Nagesh as Babu Kunwar Singh
- Hemant Choudhary as Amar Singh
- Biren Singh as Hare Krishna Singh
- Chandan Madan as Nishan Singh
- Ajay Chaudhary as Virendranath Chattopadhyay
- Randheer Rai as Ras Bihari Bose
- Iqbal Azad as Subhash Chandra Bose
- Manan Joshi as Raja Mahendra Pratap
- Sukirti Kandpal as Pritilata Waddedar
- Shresth Kumar as Alluri Sitarama Raju
- Shagun Pandey as Mahavir Singh
- Ashwat Kanth Sharma as Bhagat Singh
- Manish Naggdev as Chandra Shekar Azad
- Varun Jain as Sukhdev Thapar
- Gaurav amlani as Shivaram Rajguru
- Pooja Singh as Dhurga Bhabhi
- Rajvir Singh as Lala Har Dayal
- Vihan Verma as Ram Prasad Bismil
- Kinshuk Vaidya as Udham Singh
- Rudra Soni as Wazir Ali
- Himanshu Bamzai as Subramania Bharathi
- Aamir Rafiq as Harry Burnett Lumsden

=== Recurring cast ===
- Ram Awana as Sita Ram
- Anand Goradia as Lala Har Dayal (only for 1 episode)
- Vijayesh Kumar Mishra as Panna Sen (for episodes 59 and 60)
- Mahika Sharma as Chellamma : Subramania Bharati's Wife

== Episode list ==
Episode No	Name	Date
1	Vasco Da Gama Reached India	14 August 2022
2	Vijayanagara Empire	21 August 2022
3	Freedom Fighter Rani Abbakka and Rani Chennabhairadevi	28 August 2022
4	Freedom Fighter Shivappa Nayaka	4 September 2022
5	Story Of Shivaji	11 September 2022
6	Freedom fighter Kanhoji Angre	18 September 2022
7	Story of Baji Rao	25 September 2022
8	Freedom Fighter Chimaji Appa	2 October 2022
9	EIC – French	9 October 2022
10	EIC – British	16 October 2022
11	Freedom Fighter Marthanda Varma	23 October 2022
12	Battle of Plassey	30 October 2022
13	Freedom Fighter Puli Thevar	6 November 2022
14	Freedom Fighter Rani Velu Nachiyar	13 November 2022
15	Freedom Fighter Veerapandiya Kattabomman	20 November 2022
16	Story Of Pazhassi Raja	27 November 2022
17	Sanyasi Movement	4 December 2022
18	Bakshi Jagbandhu Paika Leaders	11 December 2022
19	Freedom Fighter Wazir Ali	18 December 2022
20	Freedom Fighter Velu Thampi Dalawa	25 December 2022
21	Freedom Fighter Tilka Manjhi	1 January 2023
22	Haathras Revolt (Raja Dayaram)	8 January 2023
23	Freedom Fighter U Tirot Singh	15 January 2023
24	Sidho Murmu and Kano Murmu	22 January 2023
25	Freedom Fighter Narendrajeeth Singh	29 January 2023
26	Mangal Pandey and Bindi Tiwari	5 February 2023
27	Freedom Fighter Nana Saheb	12 February 2023
28	Azimullah Khan and RangoBapu	19 February 2023
29	Sipahi Vidroh	26 February 2023
30	Freedom Fighter Matadin Bhangi	5 March 2023
31	Freedom Fighter Bakht Khan	12 March 2023
32	Udmi ram and Ratni Devi	19 March 2023
33	Story of Azizan Bai	26 March 2023
34	Begum Hazrat Mahal	2 April 2023
35	Kunwar Singh and Amar Singh	9 April 2023
36	Story of Rani Laxmibai	16 April 2023
37	Freedom Fighter Tatya Tope	23 April 2023
38	Freedom Fighter Tikendrajit Singh	30 April 2023
39	Freedom Fighter Birsa Munda	7 May 2023
40	Freedom Fighter Sardar Ajit Singh	14 May 2023
41	Rani Avantibai	21 May 2023
42	Freedom Fighter Vasudev Balwant Phadke	28 May 2023
43	Chapekar Bhandu	4 June 2023
44	Rani Gaidinliu	11 June 2023
45	Freedom Fighter Bhupendranath Datta	18 June 2023
46	Sister Nivedita	25 June 2023
47	Freedom Fighter Barin Ghosh	2 July 2023
48	Kanailal Dutta and Satyendranath Bosu	9 July 2023
49	Shyamji Krishna Varma	16 July 2023
50	Freedom Fighter Bhikaiji Cama	23 July 2023
51	Freedom Fighter Virendranath Chattopadhyaya	30 July 2023
52	Freedom Fighter Madan Lal Dhingra	6 August 2023
53	Freedom Fighter Lala Hardayal	13 August 2023
54	Freedom Fighter Kartar Singh Sarabha	20 August 2023
55	Freedom Fighter Ras Bhihari Bose	27 August 2023
56	Freedom Fighter Khan Abdul Gafar Khan	3 September 2023
57	Freedom Fighter Baikuntha Shukla	10 September 2023
58	Story of Raja Mahendra Pratap Singh	17 September 2023
59	Freedom Fighter Surya Sen	24 September 2023
60	Freedom Fighter Pritilata Waddedar	1 October 2023
61	Alluri Sitarama Raju	8 October 2023
62	Pushpalata Das and Kanaklata Barua	15 October 2023
63	Freedom Fighter Mahavir Singh	22 October 2023
64	Bhagwati Charan Vohra and Durga Bhabhi	29 October 2023
65	Indian revolutionary Chandra Shekhar Azad	5 November 2023
66	Ram Prasad Bismil	12 November 2023
67	Sukhdev and Rajguru	19 November 2023
68	Indian revolutionary Sachindra Nath Sanyal	26 November 2023
69	Sardar Udham Singh	3 December 2023
70	Bhai Parmanand	9 December 2023
71	Freedom Fighter Subramania Bharati	17 December 2023
72	Indian revolutionary Senapati Bapat	23 December 2023
73	Genda Lal Dixit	31 December 2023
74	Subash Chandra Bose and Poswuyi Swuro	7 January 2024
75	Baba Raghav Das	14 January 2024

== Production ==
Swaraj was regarded as the most expensive TV show of DD national with a budget ₹55 lakh 46 thousand per episode.

=== Release ===
The shooting of the series began in June 2020 in India. Prime Minister of India Narendra Modi widely promoted the show. The audio version of the serial broadcast on All India Radio network. The Swaraj serial was officially launched on August 5, 2022 by Shri Amit Shah, who is the Union Minister for Home & Cooperation, along with Shri Anurag Singh Thakur, who is the Union Minister for Information & Broadcasting, and Dr. L. Murugan, who is the Union Minister of State for Information & Broadcasting. It premeried on 14 August 2022 on DD National.

== Waves ==
Now, it is freely available on Waves app, Prasar Bharati's newly launched OTT platform.

== Awards and nominations ==
Year	Award	Category	Nominee	Result	Ref.
2023	Indian Telly Awards	Best Special/Visual Effects for Television	ILLUSION Reality Studios	Won	
2023	Indian Telly Awards	Best Art Director	Rampratap Singh	Won	
2023	Indian Telly Awards	Best TV Cameraman (Fiction )	Pappu Sahu	Nominated	
2023	Indian Telly Awards	Best Director	Sohail Tatari	Won	
2023	Indian Telly Awards	Best Screenplay Writer (Drama series & Soap)	Anand Nilkanthan	Nominated	
2023	Indian Telly Awards	Best Anchor	Manoj Joshi	Won	
