= Gharwali Pedwali =

Indian television supernatural series

- Genre: Sitcom; Supernatural
- Created by: Nissar Parvez; Alind Srivastava; Rahul Jindal
- Written by: Dialogue: Rishabh Sharma
- Screenplay by: Nitin Keswani
- Story by: Prakriti Mukherjee, Nitin Keswani
- Directed by: Jaackson Sethi; Ashish Khurana
- Starring: Paras Arora; Seerat Kapoor; Priyamvada Kant; Sapna Thakur
- Country of origin: India
- Original language: Hindi
- No. of seasons: 1
- No. of episodes: 120

Production
- Producers: Nissar Parvez; Alind Srivastava; Piyush Dinesh Gupta; Rahul Jindal
- Cinematography: Raj Kumar Turkar; Kunal V. Kadam
- Editor: Ganga Kacharla
- Camera setup: Multi-camera
- Running time: 20–25 minutes
- Production company: Peninsula Pictures

Original release
- Network: &TV; ZEE5
- Release: 5 December 2025 – 29 May 2026

Gharwali Pedwali is an Indian television series produced by Peninsula Pictures that aired on 5 December 2025 to 29 May 2026 on &TV and ZEE5. It stars Paras Arora, Seerat Kapoor, and Priyamvada Kant.

== Plot ==
Jeetu is raised by two sets of parents. He has everything doubled in his life, including two mothers, two fathers, and two bosses. Now, destiny gives him two wives. Jeetu wants a simple, devoted wife, but just before his marriage, an astrologer tells him for a symbolic marriage with a tree that turned into a spirit named Latika, who believes that she is Jeetu’s real wife. Now, Jeetu is caught between his actual wife, Savi, and Latika. What will he do now?

== Cast ==
- Paras Arora as Jeetu Pandey
- Seerat Kapoor as Savi
- Priyamvada Kant as Latika

=== Recurring ===
- Geeta Bisht as Geeta Pandey
- Richa Soni / Sapna Thakur as Reeta Pandey
- Harsh Vashisht as Ramesh Pandey
- Brij Bhushan Shukla as Suresh Pandey
- Ankit Mohan as Yaksha
- Babloo Mukherjee as Dadaji
- Prreity Sahay Dubey as Ritika
- Amitabh Ghanekar as Panauti
- Priyamvada Singh as Savitri
- Sudeep Sarangi as Tillumal
- Vinayak Singh as Lattu
- Lota Tiwari as Pappi
- Ankur Jain as Vinod Dwivedi
- Neetha Shetty as Sheena

== Production ==
=== Development ===
In July 2025, &TV announced a new series titled Gharwali Pedwali.

=== Casting ===
Paras Arora was confirmed to play Jeetu Pandey. Neeharika Roy was first approached for Savi but was replaced by Seerat Kapoor. Priyamvada Kant was selected to play Latika.
