= Lavina Tandon =

Indian actress (born 1991)

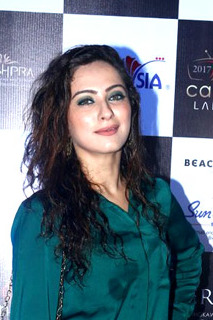
- Tandon in 2016
- Born: 14 May 1991 (age 35); Ludhiana, Punjab, India
- Occupation: Actress
- Years active: 2003–present
- Known for: Ruqaiya Sultan Begum in Jodha Akbar

Lavina Tandon is an Indian television actress who started her career as a child artist. She is mainly known for her role of Ruqaiya Sultan Begum in the television series Jodha Akbar.

== Filmography ==
=== Television ===
Year	Show	Role	Notes	Ref
2004	Tum Bin Jaaoon Kahaan	Child Khushi Mehra		
2004	Kabhi Khushi Kabhi Dhoom	Unknown	Child artist	
2005	Hero - Bhakti Hi Shakti Hai	Charlotte		
2006	Dharti Ka Veer Yodha Prithviraj Chauhan	Chamki		
2006	Ssshhhh... Phir Koi Hai	Kaveri		
2007	Dill Mill Gayye	Patient	Episode 40	
2008	Sunaina	Niharika Shastri	Guest Appearance	
2009	Yahaaan Main Ghar Ghar Kheli	Thakurain Kanika Singh		
2010	Papad Pol – Shahabuddin Rathod Ki Rangeen Duniya	Ranjanba Darbar		
2012	Best of Luck Nikki	Star	Special appearance	
2012	Baal Veer	Gaal Pari	Supporting Role	
2012	Hum Ne Li Hai... Shapath	Dolly	Special appearance	
2013	Ek Hazaaron Mein Meri Behna Hai	Sweety Dabindar Chaudhary	Supporting Role	
2013	Jodha Akbar	Ruqaiya Sultan Begum		
2015	Tum Hi Ho Bandhu Sakha Tumhi	Shaina		
2015	Pyaar Tune Kya Kiya	Nidhi		
2015	Naagin	Goddess Kali	Cameo Role	
2016	Waaris	Swaroop Bajwa	Supporting Role	
2017	Chandra Nandini	Mohini		
2018	Muskaan	Suzzain		
2018	Mariam Khan - Reporting Live	Aarshifa		
2018	Vish Ya Amrit: Sitara	Surili		
2018	Vighnaharta Ganesh	Meera Bai		
2023	Swaraj	Hazrat Mahal	Episode 34	
2025–2026	Ganesh Kartikey	Indrani		

=== Films ===
Year	Show	Role	Notes	Ref
2025	Mannu Kya Karegga			

== See also ==
- List of Hindi television actresses
- List of Indian television actresses
- List of Indian television actors
