= Shubh Laabh – Aapkey Ghar Mein =

Indian drama television series

- Starring: Geetanjali Tikekar; Chhavi Pandey
- Country of origin: India
- Original language: Hindi
- No. of seasons: 2
- No. of episodes: 290

Original release
- Network: Sony SAB
- Release: 13 September 2021 – 20 August 2022

Shubh Laabh – Aapkey Ghar Mein (transl. Good Luck – In Your House) is an Indian Hindi-language drama television series. It aired its first season from 13 September 2021 to 28 May 2022 and second season from 30 May 2022 to 20 August 2022 on Sony SAB.

== Series overview ==
No. of season	No of episodes	Originally broadcast	
No. of season	No of episodes	First aired	Last aired
1	218	13 September 2021	28 May 2022
2	72	30 May 2022	20 August 2022

== Plot ==
Savita Toshniwal, a middle-aged ardent devotee of Devi Lakshmi, runs a snack shop in Ratlam along with her husband, Niranjan but faces financial crisis, for which she blames Lakshmi. When Lakshmi feels that Savita is considering her as a "shortcut", she descends on Earth in a human avatar to meet Savita and explain to her the true meaning of Lakshmi. While guiding her on a journey of self-transformation, Lakshmi makes Savita realize that God cannot perform miracle – God can only provide opportunities, but it is the devotee who must accept the opportunity and perform the miracle.

Lakshmi notices that Savita's family consists of all of the seven sins; Anger, Greed, Ego, Envy, Lust, Laziness, and Overprotective Love. With time, Savita accepts these sins in her family. Savita's younger son, Vaibhav marries Shreya. Eventually, all Toshniwal family members correct their sins.

Lakshmi's evil elder sister, Devi Alakshmi arrives and plots to get revenge from her. Savita's elder son, Rohit and his wife, Maya lose their child due to the arrival of Alakshmi. Savita considers Alakshmi to be Lakshmi and worships her from the heart, due to which the powers of Alakshmi start increasing and she shows her effect. Savita's sister, Kavita and her husband, Alok, return to Toshniwal family to ruin their happiness.

Savita finds out that the one she considered as Lakshmi was actually Alakshmi. She allows Kavita to stay with them. Lakshmi blesses Savita that a part of her will be born from Shreya. Both Shreya and Maya get pregnant and Kavita brainwashes Maya against Savita and Shreya. Kavita notices that Shreya is having extraordinary powers and thinks that it's because of her child. Shreya is kidnapped by Kavita's goons, but is saved by Lakshmi and gives birth to a girl near a temple. Maya too delivers a girl, who later dies. Shreya learns that Maya can't become a mother and gives her daughter to Maya.

The baby is named Shree. 7 months later, Maya becomes insecure seeing Shreya's affection for Shree. Kavita and Keshav's ill deeds are exposed. Shree follows Shreya to save her and Shreya is accused for Shree's missing. While confronting them, Shreya tells Maya that Shree is being her daughter. Vaibhav gets angry and asks Shreya to leave. Shree, who returned, witnesses this and leaves Toshniwals. Lakshmi also leaves with her. Vaibhav and Shreya file a divorce and leave Ratlam. Shree is found by a taxi driver, Ashok and adopted as Asha with dismay of his pregnant wife, Kusum. Maya's mother, Menaka buys Toshniwal's ancestral house when they face crisis.

=== 7 years later ===
Shree lives with her adoptive family with the hate of Kusum and her daughter, Komal. Toshniwal house is now controlled by Menaka. Maya and Rohit have a daughter, Myra who is spoilt by Maya and Menaka while Aditi and Vidyadhar have a son, Dhruv. Savita is insulted by Menaka, Maya and Myra. Shree is abandoned by Kusum and ends up at an orphanage. Shreya returns from abroad. Soon, Savita and Shreya meet Asha (Shree) at orphanage. Not knowing the fact that Asha was Shree three of them spent a night together. Menaka bring Shree at Toshniwal house after Shree saved Myra from a snake. Meneka's younger daughter Isha comes and pursues Vaibhav. She invites Shreya at Vaibhav's birthday. Shree mistakenly spills water on floor on which Shreya slips and slaps Isha. Isha now plots to take over Shreya's place. Lakshmi punishes Shree for misusing her powers and takes her powers away; Menaka and Isha find out that Asha is Shree by seeing her anklets and she plans to separate Shree from the Toshniwals and send her to Kusum but fails. Lakshmi returns Shree's powers to save Savita and Shreya. The series ends with Menaka going out of the house along with her daughter Isha.

== Cast ==
=== Main ===
- Geetanjali Tikekar as Savita Toshniwal:
  - An ardent devotee of Devi Lakshmi; Kavita's sister; Niranjan's wife; Rohit, Aditi and Vaibhav's mother; Shree, Myra and Dhruv's grandmother. (2021–2022)
- Chhavi Pandey as Goddess:
  - Devi Mahalakshmi – notable goddess in Hinduism (2021–2022)
  - Devi Alakshmi – Devi Lakshmi's elder sister (2022)
  - Divya – Devi Lakshmi's human form (2021–2022)

=== Recurring ===
- Nasir Khan as Niranjan Toshniwal – Alok's brother; Savita's husband; Rohit, Aditi and Vaibhav's father; Shree, Myra and Dhruv's grandfather. (2021–2022)
- Tanisha Mehta as Shreya Maheshwari – Sanjeev's daughter; Vaibhav's wife; Shree's mother (2021–2022)
- Manan Joshi as Vaibhav Toshniwal – Savita and Niranjan's younger son; Rohit and Aditi's brother; Shreya's husband; Isha’s ex–husband; Shree's father. (2021)
  - Aashay Mishra replaced Joshi as Vaibhav (2021-2022)
- Hirva Trivedi as Shree "Asha" Toshniwal – Devi Lakshmi's partial incarnation; Shreya and Vaibhav's daughter (2022)
  - Misha as Baby Shree (2022)
- Pranoti Pradhan as Menaka Kansara – Maya and Isha's mother; Myra's grandmother. (2022)
- Himani Sahani as Isha Kansara – Menaka's younger daughter; Maya's sister; Vaibhav's ex–wife. (2022)
- Mithil Jain as Rohit Toshniwal – Savita and Niranjan's elder son; Aditi and Vaibhav's brother; Maya's husband; Myra's father. (2021–2022)
- Afreen Alvi as Maya Kansara– Menaka's elder daughter; Isha’s sister; Rohit's wife; Myra's mother. (2021–2022)
  - Reema Vohra replaced Alvi as Maya (2022)
- Mahi Sharma as Aditi Toshniwal Agarwal – Savita and Niranjan's daughter; Rohit and Vaibhav's sister; Vidyadhar's wife; Dhruv's mother. (2021–2022)
- Rahul Singh as Vidyadhar Agarwal – Aditi's husband; Dhruv's father. (2021–2022)
- Gaurika Sharma as Myra Toshniwal – Maya and Rohit's daughter (2022)
- Swastik Tiwari as Dhruv Agarwal – Aditi and Vidyadhar's son (2022)
- Poonam Sirnaik as Mrs. Toshniwal aka Amma – Alok and Niranjan's mother; Rohit, Aditi and Vaibhav's grandmother Shree, Myra and Dhruv's great grandmother (2021–2022)
- Nimisha Vakharia as Kavita Toshniwal – Savita's sister; Alak’s wife (2022)
- Swayam Joshi as Raj – Student of Private Tutorials (2022)
- Pawan Mahendru as Alak Toshniwal – Niranjan's brother; Kavita's husband (2022)
- Karan Khandelwal as Abhiraj – Shreya's friend and business partner (2022)
- Deepak Dutta as Sanjeev Maheshwari – Shreya's father; Shree's grandfather (2021–2022)
- Gauri Sharma as Netra – Guruji's daughter; Keshav's boss (2022)
- Hetal Puniwala as Keshav – Guruji's assistant; Kavita's helper; later Netra's sidekick (2022)
- Anup Lota as Gullu – Toshniwals' servant (2021)
- Kashvi Barbhaya as Devi Chanchala Lakshmi (2022)
- Kinjal Pandya as Preeti – Roopchand's daughter; Vaibhav's ex–fiancée (2021)
- Bobby Khanna as Roopchand – Preeti's father (2021–2022)
- Preeti Gandwani as Roopchand's wife; Preeti's mother (2021)
- Lakshya Handa as Nishant – Aditi’s college friend (2022)
- Krip Suri as Rishabh Verma – Shreya's one-sided love interest (2022)
- Mansi Arora as Vinita – Vidyadhar's love interest, who blackmails him in the end (2022)
- Razia Khanam as Rekha – the masseuse hired by Maya for Shree (2022)
- Harsh Chatrath as Mr. Chaudhary – Niranjan's wealthy friend, who belittles Niranjan time and again, and offers job to Vaibhav (2021)
- Tejaswi Khatal as Gunjan – Shreya's journalist friend (2021)
- Naman Arora as Jacob – Vaibhav's friend (2021)
- Vineet Sharma as Mr. Verma – the municipal officer (2021)

=== Guest ===
- Ashish Kapoor as Chef Sunil - Shreya's cousin (2021)
- Rakhi Sawant as Begum Chorni (2021)
- Ketan Singh as Badshah Chor (2021)
- Gulki Joshi as S.H.O. Haseena Malik from Maddam Sir (2021)

== Crossover ==
The Big Shanivaar is crossover of all Sony SAB's on-going shows (except Taarak Mehta Ka Ooltah Chashmah) on 9 October 2021 to promote Sony SAB telecasting their shows on Saturday also.

The Big Shanivaar is crossover of all Sony SAB's on-going shows (except Taarak Mehta Ka Ooltah Chashmah) on 20 November 2021 on the occasion of Diwali in Parakram SAF and to help its Cadet Koel Roy in escaping from her husband.

== See also ==
- List of programmes broadcast by Sony SAB
