= Krip Suri =

Indian actor and model (born 1986)

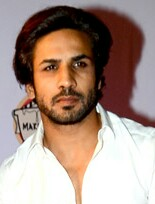
- Suri at Television Style Awards 2015
- Born: 14 June 1986 (age 40)
- Occupations: Model, actor
- Known for: Savitri; Sadda Haq
- Spouse: Simran Kaur (m. 2014; div. 2026)
- Children: 1

Krip Kapur Suri (born 14 June 1986) is an Indian model turned actor. He is primarily known for his role of Prof. Vardhan Suryavanshi in Channel V India's Sadda Haq and Raahukaal in Life OK's Savitri. He also portrayed the role of Ravi Garewal in Life OK's Kalash and Adhiraj Rajawat in Zee TV's Jeet Gayi Toh Piya Morey and of Duryodhan in RadhaKrishn on Star Bharat.

== Personal life ==
Krip was born into a Punjabi middle-class family hailing from Delhi. Krip had always dream of becoming a successful actor, though didn't even have money to enroll himself into an acting school. In an interview he stated: "I arrived in Mumbai ten years ago on 17 January 2003 and was living in a room with eight people. I was unable to pay rent and was out on the streets for three days. On seeing me sleeping on the streets a generous soul offered me accommodation till I could afford to find a roof over my head and pay rent for the same. I was also without any morsel of food for six days." However he soon passed this struggling phase with his strong dedication towards acting. Krip has a great interest in photography and is a good football player too. "Well, acting is my career. But yes, along with acting, I would like to work really hard on my photography skills. I want to keep a really good collection of photographs clicked by me. My camera is my best friend." says he.

Suri married Simran Kaur on 6 December 2014, in Delhi. However, Suri's father passed away on the morning of the wedding day after battling cancer. Following the tragedy, the elaborate wedding rituals and celebrations were put on hold. They remarried on 5 August 2018, at a gurudwara in Mumbai. On 19 January 2020, the couple had a baby girl, Ray Kapur Suri. The couple divorced on 1 January 2026.

== Filmography ==
Year	Title	Role	Notes	Ref(s)
2011	Yamla Pagla Deewana	Sukhdev (Kohti)		
2022	Naam Tha Kanhaiyalal	Anchor	Documentary	

== Television ==
Year	Show	Role
2010	Maan Rahe Tera Pitaah	Madhav
2010–2011	Apno Ke Liye Geeta Ka Dharmayudh	Raghu
2011–2012	Phulwa	Babu
2013	Savitri	Raahukaal
2013–2015	Sadda Haq	Prof. Vardhan Suryavanshi
2014	Uttaran	Asgar
2014–2015	Bharat Ka Veer Putra – Maharana Pratap	Jalaluddin Mohammad Akbar
2015–2017	Kalash	Ravi Garewal
2016	Box Cricket League	Himself
2017–2018	Jeet Gayi Toh Piya Morey	Adhiraj Rajawat
2018	Laal Ishq	Shrikant
2019	Vish: A Poisonous Story	Vishaira
2020	RadhaKrishn	Duryodhan
2021	Hero – Gayab Mode On	Guru khatri / Jwalasur
2021–2022	Baal Shiv – Mahadev Ki Andekhi Gatha	Andhaka
2022	Fanaa: Ishq Mein Marjawan	Inspector Virat Singh
2022	Shubh Laabh - Aapkey Ghar Mein	Rishabh Verma
2022	Swaraj	Marthanda Varma
2023	Tere Ishq Mein Ghayal	Daksh Oberoi
2023	Baghin	Agni
2024	10:29 Ki Aakhri Dastak	Pablo Tripathi
2024	Gudiya Rani	Mahendra Pratap Shukla
2025–present	Udne Ki Aasha	Arun
