= Karam Rajpal =

Indian actor

Karam S Raajpal
- Born: Ludhiana, Punjab, India
- Occupation: Actor
- Years active: 2011–present
- Known for: Nadaan Parindey Ghar Aaja; Mere Angne Mein; Manmohini; Qayaamat Se Qayaamat Tak

Karam Rajpal is an Indian actor who primarily works in Hindi television. Rajpal is best known for his portrayal of Sameer Atwal and Ameer Atwal in Nadaan Parindey Ghar Aaja, Shivam Shrivastav in Mere Angne Mein, Mann Sisodia in Manmohini and Dr. Rajneesh Raghuvanshi in Qayaamat Se Qayaamat Tak.

== Personal life ==
Rajpal was in a longtime relationship with actress Shivaleeka Oberoi. The couple broke up in 2019.

== Career ==
Rajpal made his acting debut in 2011, with Hamari Saass Leela, where he played Ayush Parekh. From 2011 to 2012, he played Rohit Thakral opposite Prerna Wanvari in Parichay – Nayee Zindagi Kay Sapno Ka. In 2012, he played Madhav Chawla in Kya Huaa Tera Vaada. In 2013, Rajpal made his Hindi film debut with Mere Dad Ki Maruti, where he played Daljeet Bhinder. In the same year, he played Samar Raghuvanshi in Suvreen Guggal – Topper of The Year opposite Smriti Kalra; and played Hemant Parulkar in Rakshak.

Rajpal had his first lead role with Nadaan Parindey Ghar Aaja, in 2014. He played dual roles of brothers Sameer Atwal and Ameer "Iqbal" Atwal opposite Gulki Joshi. Rajpal's career marked a turning point with Mere Angne Mein, which became his breakthrough. From 2015 to 2017, he played Shivam Shrivastav opposite Ekta Kaul and Richa Mukherjee. From 2017 to 2018, he played Vidyut Pandit in Naamkarann opposite Poonampreet Bhatia.

In 2018, Rajpal first played Bhagat Singh in Chandrashekhar. He then played Akshay opposite Veebha Anand in the first episode of Laal Ishq. That year, he also played dual roles of Ajay Pratapsingh and Kaalasur in Qayamat Ki Raat. In 2019, he played Sujoy Das opposite Yesha Rughani in Musakaan. From 2019 to 2020, Rajpal played Mann "Shiv" Sisodia opposite Vaishali Takkar in Manmohini. In 2020, he played Guddu Pahalwan in Gudiya Hamari Sabhi Pe Bhari opposite Sarika Bahroliya.

In 2022, Rajpal played twin brothers Dhruv Pandey and Deva Tripathi in Rang Jaun Tere Rang Mein opposite Megha Ray. In January 2023, he played the lead character Dev Mishra and Shivay in Ishq Ki Dastaan – Naagmani opposite Aleya Ghosh. In 2024, Rajpal made his web debut with Kalwa. In the same year, he played Dr. Rajneesh Raghuvanshi in Qayaamat Se Qayaamat Tak opposite Trupti Mishra.

Since July 2025, he is seen playing Anurag opposite Megha Chakraborty in Ishani.

== Filmography ==
=== Films ===
Year	Title	Role	Notes	Ref.
2013	Mere Dad Ki Maruti	Daljeet Bhinder		
2015	I Am Mr Mother	Karan		

=== Television ===
Year	Title	Role	Notes	Ref.
2011	Hamari Saas Leela	Ayush Parekh		
2011–2012	Parichay – Nayee Zindagi Kay Sapno Ka	Rohit Thakral		
2012	Kya Huaa Tera Vaada	Madhav Chawla		
2013	Suvreen Guggal – Topper of The Year	Samar Raghuvanshi		
2013	Rakshak	Hemant Parulkar		
2014	Nadaan Parindey Ghar Aaja	Sameer Atwal		
2014	Nadaan Parindey Ghar Aaja	Ameer "Iqbal" Atwal		
2015–2017	Mere Angne Mein	Shivam Shrivastav "Bullet Raja"		
2016	Box Cricket League 2	Contestant	Team: Pune Anmol Ratan	
2017–2018	Naamkarann	Vidyut Pandit		
2018	Chandrashekhar	Bhagat Singh		
2018	Laal Ishq	Akshay	Episode: "Chhalawa"	
2018	Qayamat Ki Raat	Ajay Pratapsingh		
2018	Qayamat Ki Raat	Kaalasur		
2019	Muskaan	Sujoy Das		
2019–2020	Manmohini	Mann "Shiv" Sisodia		
2020	Gudiya Hamari Sabhi Pe Bhari	Guddu Pehelwan		
2022	Rang Jaun Tere Rang Mein	Dhruv Pandey		
2022	Rang Jaun Tere Rang Mein	Deva Tripathi		
2023	Ishq Ki Dastaan – Naagmani	Dev Mishra		
2023	Ishq Ki Dastaan – Naagmani	Shivay		
2024	Qayaamat Se Qayaamat Tak	Dr. Rajneesh "Raj" Raghuvanshi		
2024	Kalwa	Ajay		
2025	Ishani	Anurag Banarjee		

=== Music video ===
Year	Title	Singer	Ref.
2023	Kya Loge Tum	B Praak	

== See also ==
- List of Hindi television actors
