= Manju Bharti =

Indian actress, producer, director and model

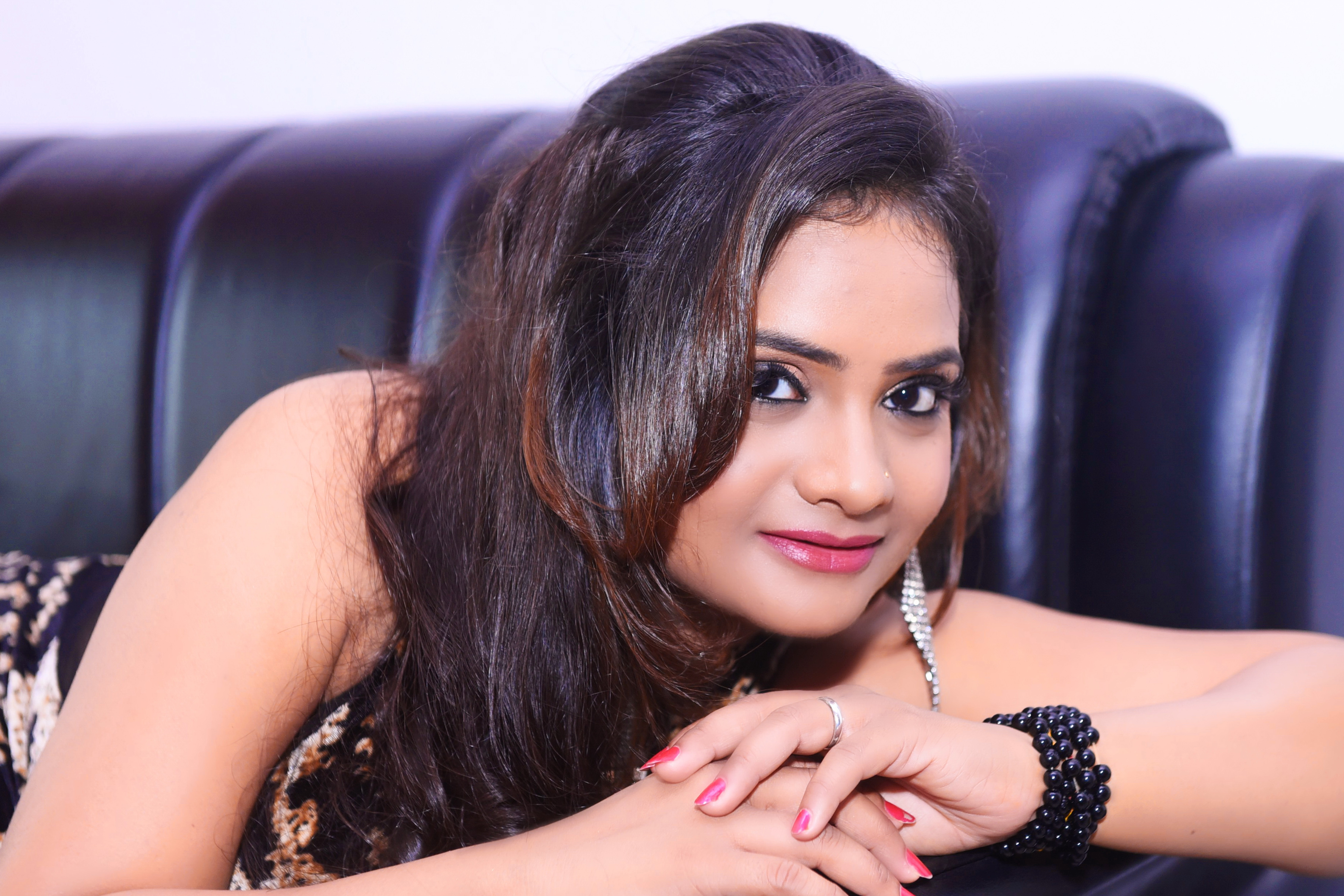
- Manju Bharti
- Born: 21 March 1983 (age 43); Mumbai, Maharashtra, India
- Education: University of Mumbai
- Occupations: Actress, director and producer
- Years active: 2012-present
- Known for: Portraying Simran in Kaash Tum Hote
- Notable work: Kaash Tum Hote (2014) Mausam Ikrar Ke Do Pal Pyar Ke (2018) Pyar Mein Thoda Twist (2022) Ek Adhura Sangeet (2024)
- Spouse: Mukesh J Bharti
- Children: 1

Manju Bharti is an Indian actress, producer, director, and model known for her role as Simran in Kaash Tum Hote. She has produced films including Kaash Tum Hote, Mausam Ikrar Ke Do Pal Pyar Ke, and Pyar Mein Thoda Twist. She is working on her upcoming film Ek Adhura Sangeet.

== Early life and background ==
Born on 21 March 1983, Manju finished her schooling from Swami Vivekananda High School, Chembur and earned a Bachelor's in Commerce degree from Mumbai University in 2003.

== Career ==
In 2012, Manju launched her production company, Vivek Films Production House. She made her filmmaking debut in 2014 as a producer, actor, and director with the romantic film Kaash Tum Hote, which featured her husband Mukesh J Bharti and Indian model and actress Preeti Jhangiani. In the film, she played the second female lead, Simran, alongside a cast that included Farida Jalal, Sharat Saxena, Sanjay Mishra and Himani Shivpuri. The film included music by artists such as Rahat Fateh Ali Khan, Asha Bhosle, Sonu Nigam, Javed Ali, Sunidhi Chauhan, Alka Yagnik, Shaan, and Palak Muchhal.

After her debut, she produced the romantic drama Mausam Ikrar Ke Do Pal Pyar Ke in 2018, directed by Partho Ghosh and starring Mukesh J Bharti and actress Madalsa Sharma alongside a cast that included Neelu Kohli, Avinash Wadhwan, Usha Bachani, Hemant Pandey, and Arun Bakshi. The music was composed by Bappi Lahiri and sung by him along with Armaan Malik, Palak Muchhal, Shaan, Brijesh Shandilya, Amruta Fadnavis, and Babul Supriyo. The songs in the film were choreographed by Ganesh Acharya, and the movie was filmed in Nainital, Uttarakhand. The film's poster was launched by Veteran Director and producer Farah Khan along with Bappi Lahiri.

After her second film, Manju produced the 2022 romantic drama, Pyar Mein Thoda Twist, directed by Partho Ghosh and starring Mukesh J Bharti and Richa Mukherjee alongside a cast that included Rajesh Sharma, Govind Namdev, Atul Srivastav, Alka Amin, Soma Rathord, Onkar Das Manikpuri, Santosh Shukla. The music was composed by Bappi Lahiri and sung by him, along with Kanika Kapoor, Ila Arun, Jointa Gandhi and Shaan. The movie was filmed in Lucknow, Uttar Pradesh. She will produce and direct the upcoming musical drama Ek Adhura Sangeet, a project that Bappi Lahiri had initially planned to direct himself. In addition, she's also working on an action thriller C60, which is a biopic of ATS chief K. P. Raghuvanshi.

In 2021, Manju founded Hangout Studio, a facility for shooting ad films, movies, TV shows, and web series. With her husband, Mukesh J Bharti, Manju opened a new shooting location at Malad West, Mumbai. The studio was officially opened with a ribbon-cutting ceremony attended by singer Shaan and Preeti Jhangiani.

== Awards and recognition ==
- 2020: Received the Midday Showbiz Icon Award 2020 held at the Grand Hyatt, Mumbai.
- 2022: Received the Midday International Icon Award in 2022 at an event held in Dubai.
- 2022: Received the Biz Glam Award in 2022 for her film Pyar Mein Thoda Twist.

== Personal life ==
Manju married actor Mukesh J Bharti in 2004, and they have one child, Vivek Bharti.

== Filmography ==
| Year | Film | Language | Role |
|---|---|---|---|
| 2024 | C60 | Hindi | |
| 2024 | Ek Adhura Sangeet | Hindi | |
| 2022 | Pyar Mein Thoda Twist | Hindi | |
| 2018 | Mausam Ikrar Ke Do Pal Pyar Ke | Hindi | Simi |
| 2014 | Kaash Tum Hote | Hindi | Simran |
