= Kanan Malhotra =

Indian model and television actor

- Born: Kanan Aditya Malhotra; New Delhi, India
- Occupation: Actor
- Years active: 2011–present
- Spouse: Aakanksha Dhingra (m. 2014; div. 2023)

Kanan Malhotra (born 8 January 1987) is an Indian television actor known for his roles in several Hindi television serials, including Chand Chupa Badal Mein, Rab Se Sohna Isshq, where he portrayed Daljeet, and Sawaare Sabke Sapne... Preeto.

== Career ==
In 2010, he made his television debut in the show Chand Chupa Badal Mein on Star Plus where he played the cameo role of Aditya Sharma. He then appeared in the Zee TV show Apno Ke Liye Geeta Ka Dharmayudh as Prateek Bhagat. In 2011, he starred as Dhruv Ahluwalia in the Imagine TV television show Sawaare Sabke Sapne... Preeto.

In 2012, Malhotra rose to fame with his portrayal of Daljeet Singh in the romantic series Rab Se Sohna Isshq on Zee TV. He later bagged the episodic role of Siddharth Kapoor in the episodic drama Pyaar Tune Kya Kiya on Zing. He then went on to appear in several mythological drama series, including Suryaputra Karn on Sony Entertainment Television and Mahakali — Anth Hi Aarambh Hai & Karmaphal Daata Shani on Colors TV.

In 2018, he appeared in Colors TV's horror episodic drama Kaun Hai? as Rudrapratap Singh. In the same year, he went on to appear in Colors TV's supernatural series Tantra as Nirvan Khanna. In 2019, he appeared as Vivek Oberoi in show called Navrangi Re! and in the same year he played the role of Bharata in show Ram Siya Ke Luv Kush till the show went off-air in 2020. In 2020, he played the role of Bhagwan Vishnu in Devi Adi Parashakti and of Yudhishthir in Star Bharat's serial RadhaKrishn. In July 2022, he played the role of Gunojirao in Punyashlok Ahilyabai. In 2023 he is playing the role of Kartik in Dangal's serial Ishq Ki Dastaan - Naagmani.

== Personal life ==
Malhotra met television actress Chahatt Khanna in 2010 and they were in a relationship for 2 years. He later dated his Rab Se Sohna Isshq co-star Ekta Kaul but the couple split in 2013.

In 2014, he married Delhi-based interior designer Aakanksha Dhingra. The couple divorced in 2023 after being separated for five years.

== Television ==
Year	Serial	Role
2011	Chand Chupa Badal Mein	Aditya Sharma
2010–2011	Apno Ke Liye Geeta Ka Dharmayudh	Prateek Bhagat
2011–2012	Sawaare Sabke Sapne... Preeto	Dhruv Ahluwalia
2012–2013	Rab Se Sohna Isshq	Daljeet Singh
2014	Aaj Phir Jeene Ki Tamanna Hai	
2014	Pyaar Tune Kya Kiya	Siddharth Kapoor
2015–2016	Suryaputra Karn	King Yudhishthir
2017	Karmaphal Daata Shani	King Harishchandra
2017–2018	Mahakali — Anth Hi Aarambh Hai	Lord Vishnu
2018	Kaun Hai?	Rudrapratap Singh
2018–2019	Tantra	Nirvan Khanna
2019	Navrangi Re!	Vivek Oberoi
2019–2020	Ram Siya Ke Luv Kush	Bharata
2020	Devi Adi Parashakti	Bhagwan Vishnu
2020	RadhaKrishn	Maharaj Yudhishthir
2022–2023	Punyashlok Ahilyabai	Gunojirao
2023	Ishq Ki Dastaan - Naagmani	Kartik
2026–present	Jagadhatri	Minister Aarav Patil
