= Pyar Mein Thoda Twist =

Indian family comedy-drama film

- Directed by: Partho Ghosh
- Produced by: Manju Bharti
- Starring: Mukesh J. Bharti; Richa Mukherjee; Rajesh Sharma; Atul Srivastava; Govind Namdev; Alka Amin; Santosh Shukla; Soma Rathod; Arpit Bhadoria; Rajeev Pandey; Omkar Das Manikpuri; Sahabdas Manikpuri; Manju Bharti
- Music by: Bappi Lahiri
- Production company: Vivek Films Production House
- Release date: 18 February 2022
- Running time: 2 h 8 min
- Country: India
- Language: Hindi

Pyar Mein Thoda Twist (transl. A Little Twist in Love) is a 2022 Indian Hindi-language family comedy-drama film directed by Partho Ghosh and produced by Manju Bharti under the banner of Vivek Films Production House.

The film stars Mukesh J. Bharti, Richa Mukherjee, Rajesh Sharma, Atul Srivastava, and Govind Namdev. It was released on 18 February 2022. The film portrays the story of an Indian family dealing with conflicts and misunderstandings surrounding their son's marriage to a girl from a lower socio-economic background. The music for the film was composed by Bappi Lahiri.

== Plot ==
The story revolves around Dheeraj Thakur and Maya, who are deeply in love despite the long-standing rivalry between their families. The plot takes a dramatic turn with the arrival of Jwala Singh, also known as Mr. Wanted, who becomes the town's most-wanted figure, with the locals and the police on his trail. As Jwala Singh's presence disrupts life in the city, Dheeraj and Maya's love story faces new challenges.

== Cast ==
- Mukesh J. Bharti as Dheeraj Thakur
- Richa Mukherjee as MAYA
- Rajesh Sharma as Vijendra Singh
- Atul Srivastava as Jagatram
- Govind Namdev as Mahant
- Alka Amin as Girija
- Manju Bharti as Paro
- Santosh Shukla as Jeeva
- Soma Rathod as Dhaniram Wife
- Rajeev Pandey as Kailash
- Omkar Das Manikpuri as Dhaniram
- Sahabdas Manikpuri
- Arpit Bhadoria

== Filming ==
The first schedule of the film began in Lucknow in November 2019 with the shooting of the song Select Kiya Re featuring Mukesh J. Bharti and Richa Mukherjee. The rest of the cast joined in December and the film was shot at several locations throughout the city.

== Soundtrack ==
Pyar Mein Thoda Twist

Soundtrack album by Bappi Lahiri
- Released: 2 February 2022
- Recorded: 2022
- Language: Hindi

The music of the film was composed by Bappi Lahiri.

Tracklisting
No.	Title	Music	Singer(s)	Length
1.	"Tutak Tutak Tutiya"	Bappi Lahiri	Shaan/Jonita Gandhi	3:55
2.	"Select Kiya Re"	Bappi Lahiri	Bappi Lahiri/Kanika Kapoor	2:46
3.	"Karonde"	Bappi Lahiri	Ila Arun	2:42

== Awards and recognition ==
Mukesh J. Bharti received the Bollywood Iconic Actor Award for his performance in Pyar Mein Thoda Twist at the Mid-Day International Icon Awards 2022, held in Dubai.

== Reception ==
In a 0,5 star out of 5 review for The Times of India, Rachana Dubey was extremely negative regarding all aspects of the production. A review at Film Information was also negative and, although finding the direction "okay", wrote: "Lack of novelty and abundance of clichéd situations are the biggest bane of the drama which, therefore, fails to involve the audience. Abhishek Shashi Kumar’s dialogues are below the mark."
