= Razakar (film) =

2024 Indian historic action-drama film

- Theatrical release poster
- Directed by: Yata Satyanarayana
- Screenplay by: Yata Satyanarayana
- Story by: Yata Satyanarayana
- Produced by: Gudur Narayana Reddy
- Starring: Bobby Simha; Tej Sapru; Makarand Deshpande; Raj Arjun; Vedhika; Anasuya Bharadwaj; Annusriya Tripathi
- Cinematography: Kushendar Ramesh Reddy
- Edited by: Tammiraju
- Music by: Bheems Ceciroleo
- Production company: Samarveer Creations LLP
- Release date: 15 March 2024
- Country: India
- Language: Telugu

Razakar, also marketed as Razakar: The Silent Genocide Of Hyderabad, is a 2024 Indian Telugu-language epic historical action drama film written and directed by Yata Satyanarayana based on the events leading to the annexation of Hyderabad in the erstwhile princely state of Hyderabad. The film is produced by Gudur Narayana Reddy, under Samarveer Creation LLP. It was released on 15 March 2024.

The film has tried to showcase the ruthless attempts by the Nizam of Hyderabad to remain independent even going as far as doing ethnic cleansing of local telugu people who were mostly hindus and wanted to join India. This film also explores the radical thinking of orthodox muslims and how the nizamate formed Razakars (Hyderabad) to remain in power even with the cost of his own citizens' blood.

== Synopsis ==
The film depicts the struggle in the erstwhile Hyderabad State after India gained independence on 15 August 1947. While the rest of the country celebrated freedom and liberation, the Hyderabad State remained under the control of the Nizam for another year. During this time, Hindus faced oppression from the ruthless Razakars, who were formed primarily to oppose the Hindu majority's wish of accession to India, and to keep Nizam under Muslim control. The film depicts the atrocities committed by the Nizam and Razakars with extreme fanaticism and the courageous acts of those who fought against them.

== Cast ==
- Bobby Simha as Rajireddy
- Tej Sapru as Sardar Vallabhbhai Patel
- Makarand Deshpande as Nizam Mir Osman Ali Khan
- Raj Arjun as Kasim Razvi
- Annusriya Tripathi as one of Mir Osman Ali Khan's wives
- Vedhika as Shanthavva
- Anasuya Bharadwaj as Pochamma
- Indraja as Chakali Ilamma
- Prema as Anthamma
- Thalaivasal Vijay as K. M. Munshi
- Chandhunadh as Bhimreddy Narasimha Reddy
- Tarak Ponnappa as Narayan Rao Pawar
- Arav Chowdharry as Major General J. N. Chaudhuri
- John Vijay as Mir Laiq Ali
- Cheluva Raj as Baswa Manaiah
- Keshav Deepak as Shoaib Ullah Khan

== Production ==
The film was shot at Ramoji Film City, Hyderabad.

== Accolades ==
Award	Ceremony date	Category	Recipients	Result	Ref.
Gaddar Telangana Film Awards 2024	14 June 2025	Best Film in the Environment / Heritage	Samarveer Creations LLP	Won	
Gaddar Telangana Film Awards 2024	14 June 2025	Best Music Director	Bheems Ceciroleo	Won	
Gaddar Telangana Film Awards 2024	14 June 2025	Best Makeup Artist	Nalla Sreenu	Won	
