= Hui Gumm Yaadein Ek Doctor, Do Zindagiyaan =

Indian medical drama television series

- Also known as: Yaadein
- Genre: Medical drama
- Based on: Doc – Nelle tue mani by: Francesco Arlanch; Viola Rispoli
- Screenplay by: Amit Senchoudhary
- Story by: Satyam Tripathi, Isha Sharma
- Starring: see below
- Composer: Nishant Pandey
- Country of origin: India
- Original language: Hindi
- No. of seasons: 1
- No. of episodes: 194

Production
- Producers: Smruti Sushilkumar Shinde; Harvindar Arora
- Cinematography: Alamgir Sheikh; Bed Prasad Pandey
- Editor: Vinay Maalu
- Running time: 25–32 minutes
- Production company: Sobo Films Holding Ltd.

Original release
- Network: Sony SAB
- Release: 6 April – 17 November 2026

Hui Gumm Yaadein Ek Doctor, Do Zindagiyaan (also known as Yaadein) is an Indian Hindi-language medical drama television series which aired on Sony SAB from 6 April 2026 to 17 November 2026 and also streamed on SonyLIV. It is an official adaptation of the Italian series Doc – Nelle tue mani. The show starred Iqbal Khan and Gulki Joshi.

== Plot ==
Dr. Dev Mehta is a skilled, strict and straightforward doctor often called as Mr. Khadoos by his staff. However, he has a special place for his junior, Dr. Vaani. Dr. Mehta is divorced from his wife Dr. Srishti Agarwal and distant from his family. When he gets shot in the head by the father of one of his patients who died, he suffers a serious head injury and wakes up without memories of the last eight years. Dev thinks he and Shrishti are still married, and doesn't remember the death of his son. His personality undergoes a drastic change, and Dev tries to adapt to his new surroundings, new relationships, and understand how he became such a different person.

== Cast ==
=== Main ===
- Iqbal Khan as Dr. Dev Mehta, a doctor who was the Head of Medicine at JBMMC until he was shot and lost 8 years of his memories
- Gulki Joshi as Dr. Srishti Agarwal Mehta - Dev's wife; Digvijay's ex-girlfriend; Dhruv and Jiya's mother
- Srishti Singh as Dr. Vaani Gupta - Rajeev's sister; Dev's former love-interest
- Harleen Rupani / Sehaj Rrajput as Jiya Mehta - Dev and Srishti's daughter; Dhruv's sister
  - Nandini Karmakar as child Jiya
- Sachin Kavetham as Malhar – Vandana and Malonji's son; Jiya's love interest
- Anupama Gowda as Shreeja - Suhasini and Pushkar's daughter

=== Recurring ===
- Avinn Tyagi as Dr. Abeer Chabbria
- Anurag Sharma as Dr. Sunny Kapoor - Ishita's husband; Sasha's father
- Devish Ahuja as Dr. Raunak Bhatia
- Priya Trivedi as Dr. Tanvi Shah
- Khyati Vyas as Dr. Ananya Singh - Tara's daughter
- Karaan Singh as Dr Girish Chatterjee - psychiatrist at JBMMC and Dev's longtime friend
- Shagun Sharma as Dr. Uditanshu - Gehna's husband
- Pradeep Shukla / Kaushal Kapoor as Dr. Jeevan Mehta - Dev and Ishita's father
- Poonam Srinaik / Bharati Patil as Mrs Mehta - Jeevan's wife; Dev and Ishita's mother
- Poonam Preet as Ishita Mehta Kapoor - Jeevan and Mrs Mehta's daughter; Dev's sister; Sunny's wife; Sasha's mother
- Veera Sanghvii as Dhruv Mehta - Dev and Srishti's late son; Jiya's brother
- Aarohi M Kumawat as Sasha Kapoor - Ishita and Sunny's daughter
- Satyam Thakur as Dr. Vinay
- Prachi Sharma as Nurse Dipika
- Annapurna Vitthal as Nurse Pratibha Kulkarni
- Sandeep Soman as Chef
- Rajan Verma as Watchman
- Arjun Punjj as Digvijay - Srishti's ex-fiancé
- Usha Bachani as Aai Sahib: Digvijay's mother
- Sapna Raghuwanshi as Tara Singh - Ananya's mother
- Meet Sindhwani as Rajeev Gupta - Vaani's brother
- Durga Kambo as Rajeev's lover
- Aslam Wadkar as Traffic Prabhat Patil
- Delnaaz Irani as Chandni Khanna: Dev's patient
- Sagar Saini as Parminder Singh Sodhi - Sweety's husband; Amarjeet's father
- Jasjeet Babbar as Sweety Kaur Sodhi - Parminder's wife; Amarjeet's mother
- Kawalpreet Singh as Amarjeet Singh Sodhi - Parminder and Sweety's son
- Sukesh Anand as Don Uday Shetty
- Krishna Bharadwaj as Satendra "Sattu" Tiwari
- Chhavi Pandey as Dr. Preeti Deshmukh
- Nidhi Thakur as Gehna - Uditanshu wife
- Saiyansh as Child Jr Dhruv Mehta - Dev and Srishti's adopted son; Jiya's adopted brother
- Jyoti Tiwari as Suhasini - Pushkar's wife; Shreeja's mother
- Manish Agnihotri as Pushkar - Suhasini's husband; Shreeja's father
- Rajat Roy as Malonji - Vandana's husband; Mallar's father
- Smiita Dongre as Vandana - Madhav's wife; Mallar's mother
- Veera Katti as Veena Tai
- Pooja Pandey as Mishri
- Rajeev Mehra as Dr. Jhola Chaap
- Dharam Punjabi as Masaan Baba

== Episodes ==
| No. | Title | Directed by | Written by | Original release date |
|---|---|---|---|---|
| 1 | "Meet Dr. Dev Mehta" | Anshuman Kishore Singh | Isha Sharma; Satyam Tripathy; Dialogues: Preeti Mamgain | 6 April 2026 |
Dr. Dev Mehta, a skilled but abrasive surgeon known for his strict professionalism, treats a police officer suffering from a brain stroke while uncovering a colleague's medical negligence in the death of a child. Despite pressure to conceal the error, he chooses to report it, leading to conflict at the hospital. Dev later suffers a traumatic incident that affects his memory.
| 2 | "Dr. Dev Loses His Memory" | Anshuman Kishore Singh | Isha Sharma; Satyam Tripathy; Dialogues: Preeti Mamgain | 7 April 2026 |
| 3 | "Dhruv's Death" | Anshuman Kishore Singh | Isha Sharma; Satyam Tripathy; Dialogues: Preeti Mamgain | 8 April 2026 |
| 4 | "Dr. Vaani Saves Dev" | Anshuman Kishore Singh | Isha Sharma; Satyam Tripathy; Dialogues: Preeti Mamgain | 9 April 2026 |

== Production ==
=== Casting ===
Iqbal Khan was confirmed to play lead, Dr. Dev Mehta after a three year television hiatus. Ekta Kaul was chosen to play Dr. Shristi, but she opted out and Gulki Joshi was replaced her.
