= Pooja Somani =

Indian actress (born 2000)

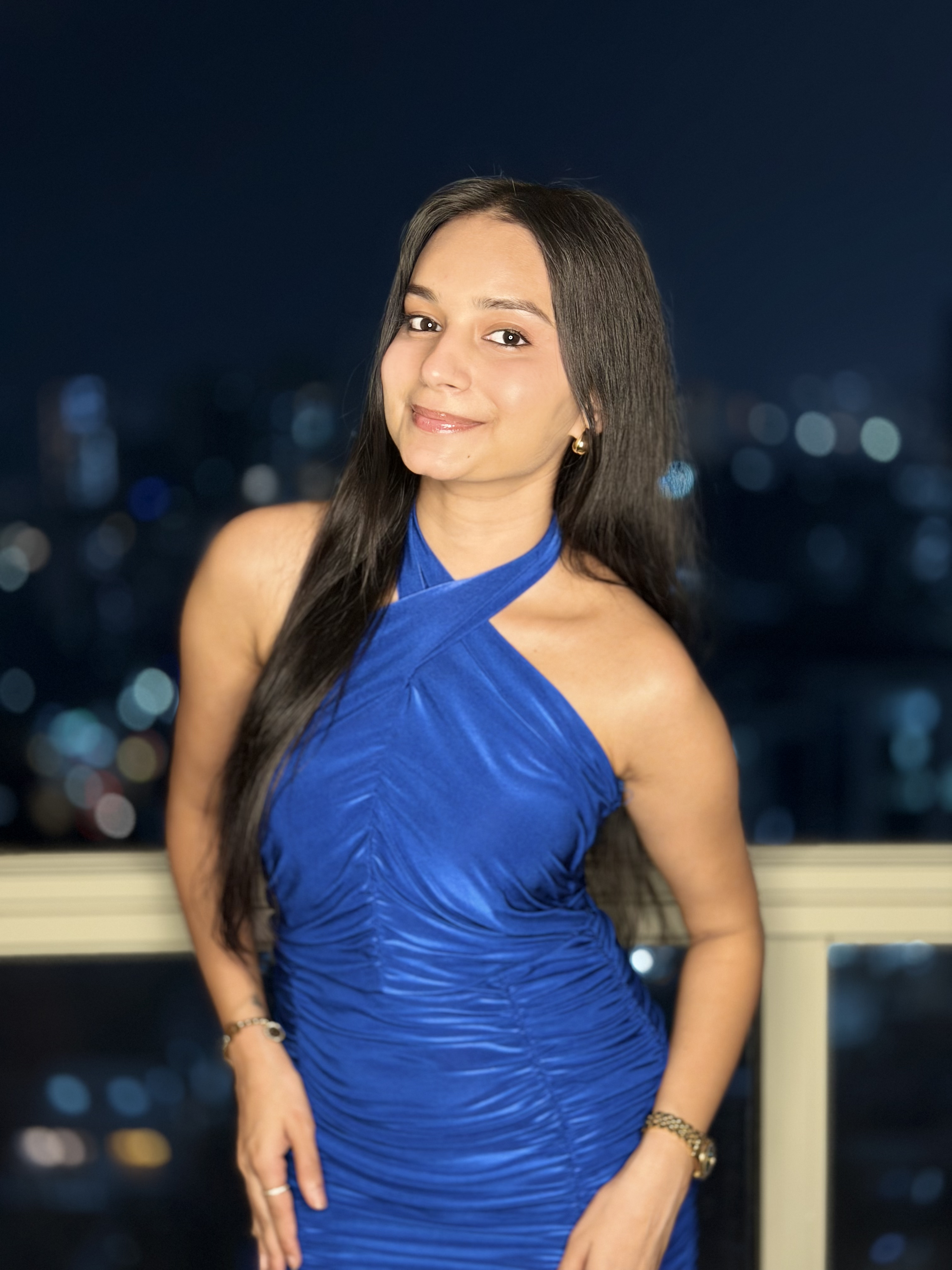
- Pooja in 2026
- Born: September 13, 2000 (age 26); Jalgaon, Maharashtra
- Years active: 2024–present
- Known for: Shiv Shakti – Tap Tyaag Tandav

Pooja Somani is an Indian actress who works in television. She made her television debut in 2024 by playing the lead role of Netra Iyer in Qayaamat Se Qayaamat Tak and In 2025 she portrayed Devasena in Shiv Shakti – Tap Tyaag Tandav.

== Filmography ==
=== Television ===
Year	Title	Role	Notes	Ref.
2024	Qayaamat Se Qayaamat Tak	Netra Iyer		
2025	Badi Haveli Ki Chhoti Thakurain	Arohi		
2025	Shiv Shakti – Tap Tyaag Tandav	Devasena		
