= Manihar (film) =

2024 Indian Hindi-language film

- Promotional poster
- Directed by: Sanjeev Kumar Rajput
- Screenplay by: Sanjeev Kumar Rajput
- Story by: Sanjeev Kumar Rajput
- Based on: Bangle seller
- Produced by: Mayank Shekhar; Namrata Singh
- Starring: Badrul Islam; Roshni Rastogi; Pankaj Berry
- Cinematography: Dilip Pal; Santosh Pal
- Edited by: Bhautik Nandha
- Music by: Asif Chandwani
- Production company: Jai Shree Movie Production
- Release date: 14 June 2024
- Running time: 122 Minutes
- Country: India
- Language: Hindi

Manihar (English: The Bangle Seller) is a 2024 Indian Hindi-language film, written and directed by Sanjeev Kumar Rajput. The film stars Badrul Islam, Roshni Rastogi and Pankaj Berry in lead roles.

== Cast ==
- Badrul Islam as a bangle seller
- Roshni Rastogi
- Pankaj Berry
- Ahsaan Qureshi
- Ramesh Goyal
- Krishna Bhatt
- Sunny Thakur
- Utkarsh Maharshi
- Durg Singh Thakur
- Tushar Verma

== Production ==
The film is mostly shot in a village named 'Baijamau' which comes under Sikandra tehsil of Kanpur Dehat district in Uttar Pradesh. The film would be released in cinemas on June 14, 2024, worldwide.

== Soundtrack ==
Manihar

Soundtrack album by Asif Chandwani
- Released: 8 May 2024
- Recorded: 2023–2024
- Genre: Feature film soundtrack
- Length: 7:05
- Language: Hindi
- Label: Zee Music Company
External audio
- Video on YouTube

The music of the film is composed by Asif Chandwani while sung by singers including Gul Saxena and Rahila Khan.

No.	Title	Lyrics	Music	Singer(s)	Length
1.	"Pehna De Chudi"	Salim Begana	Asif Chandwani	Gul Saxena	04:02
2.	"Desi Pee Ke"	Harry Mallya	Asif Chandwani	Rahila Khan	03:03
Total length:					7:05
