= Apno Ke Liye Geeta Ka Dharmayudh =

- Also known as: Geeta
- Genre: Television drama
- Creative director: Mohua Sen
- Starring: See below
- Theme music composer: Dony Hazarika
- Country of origin: India
- Original language: Hindi
- No. of seasons: 1
- No. of episodes: 131

Production
- Executive producer: Kanika Upadhyay
- Producer: Sheel Kumar
- Editors: Jay Ghadiali; Pranay Choudhary
- Camera setup: Multi-camera
- Running time: 24 minutes
- Production company: Shreya Creations

Original release
- Network: Zee TV
- Release: 6 December 2010 – 6 May 2011

Apno Ke Liye Geeta Ka Dharmayudh is an Indian television drama series that aired on Zee TV. It is the story of Geeta, a timid girl who changes into an avenging fury when her whole family is implicated in a false case of domestic violence. Geeta stands up for truth and fights to restore her family's honour.

== Cast ==
- Sargun Mehta as Geeta Bhagat
- Nikhil Chaddha as Prince, Geeta's husband
- Shalini Arora as Mrs. Bhagat, Geeta's mother
- Ravi Jhankal as Dr. Bhagat, Geeta's father
- Kanan Malhotra as Prateek Bhagat, Geeta's brother
- Urvashi Dholakia as Malini Yadav, Prince's mother who tries to ruin the Bhagat family
- Mamta Chaturya as Asha, Prince's sister who marries Prateek after he loses his first wife
- Shagun Ajmani as Kamya, Prince's sister, married to Geeta's second brother Rahul
- Krip Suri as Raghu
- Monalika Bhonsle as Sudha
