= Mere Angne Mein =

Indian drama television series

- Genre: Family drama
- Created by: Sphere Origins
- Screenplay by: Shilpa Chaubay; Sushil Chaubay; Pankaj Mavchi; Dialogues; Vinod Tarani
- Story by: Vinod Rangnath, Shilpa Choubay
- Directed by: Partho Mitra (2015–17); Vinayak Choube (2017)
- Creative director: Shikha Vij
- Starring: See below
- Composer: Lalit Sen
- Country of origin: India
- Original language: Hindi
- No. of seasons: 1
- No. of episodes: 770

Production
- Executive producer: Aayush Agrawal
- Producers: Sunjoy Waddhwa; Komall Sunjoy Waddhwa
- Production location: Mumbai
- Editors: Janak Chauhan; Firoz Khan; Anil Vaishya
- Running time: 43 minutes / 21 minutes
- Production company: Sphere Origins

Original release
- Network: Star Plus
- Release: 15 June 2015 – 5 August 2017

Mere Angne Mein is an Indian soap opera that aired on Star Plus from 15 June 2015 to 5 August 2017. The show starred Kruttika Desai Khan, Ananya Khare, Ekta Kaul, Karam Rajpal, and Richa Mukherjee as main leads. It was dubbed in English and aired on Star Life as Family Affairs.

== Plot ==
The series showcases the lives of the Srivastavs, a middle-class family in Mughalsarai, Uttar Pradesh, India. Shanti Devi is the matriarch who handles the family affairs in her own style and has complete control over everyone and their activities in the house. When Riya enters the family by marrying Shanti Devi's grandson, Shivam, she is in conflict with Shanti Devi and the established rules of the house. In addition, the series focuses on the family of Shanti Devi's daughter, Sarla. The story is interwoven with the two families' saga of incoherent conflicts.

== Cast ==
=== Main ===
- Kruttika Desai Khan as Shanti Srivastav / Shashikala / Ammaji: Sarla and Raghav's mother (2015–2017)
- Ananya Khare as Sarla Srivastav Agarwal: Shanti's daughter; Raghav's sister; Ashok's wife; Parineeta, Amit and Sonal's mother (2015–2017)
- Karam Rajpal as Shivam Srivastav / Bullet Raja: Kaushalya and Raghav's son; Preeti and Namita's brother; Riya's widower (2015–2017)
- Ekta Kaul as Riya Mathur Srivastav: Anupam's daughter; Shivam's first wife (2015–2017)
- Richa Mukherjee as Aarti Shivam Srivastav, "Charni" : Shivam's second wife (2017)

=== Recurring ===
- Suchita Trivedi as Kaushalya Srivastav / Khusiya: Ramesh's sister; Raghav's wife; Shivam, Preeti and Namita's mother (2015–2017)
- Varun Badola as Raghav Srivastav: Shanti's son; Sarla's brother; Kaushalya's husband; Shivam, Preeti and Namita's father (2015–2017)
- Ishaan Singh Manhas as Golu Singh (2017)
- Charu Asopa as Preeti Srivastav Khare: Kaushalya and Raghav's daughter; Shivam and Namita's sister; Nandkishore's wife (2015–2017)
- Dushyant Wagh as Nandkishore Khare / Nandu: Preeti's husband (2016–2017) / Lucky, A new identity taken by Nandu for Preeti (2016)
- Garima Parihar as Namita Srivastav Sinha / Nimmi / Choti Rani: Kaushalya and Raghav's daughter; Shivam and Preeti's sister; Vyom's widow (2015–2017)
- Roshni Rastogi as Rani Chauhan Agarwal / Raniya: Amit's wife (2015–2017)
- Pallavi Gupta as Parineeta Agarwal Sinha / Pari: Ashok and Sarla's daughter; Amit and Sonal's sister: Sujeev's wife (2015–2017)
- Neeraj Malviya as Amit Agarwal: Ashok and Sarla's son; Parineeta and Sonal's brother; Rani's husband (2015–2017)
- Ashiesh Roy as Ashok Agarwal: Sarla's husband; Parineeta, Amit and Sonal's father (2015–2017)
- Sanjana Phadke as Renu: Ramesh's wife (2015–2017)
- Abhilash Chaudhary as Ramesh: Kaushalya's brother (2016–2017)
- Anuj Thakur as Chandra (2017)
- Shreya Laheri as Sonal Agarwal: Ashok and Sarla's daughter; Parineeta and Amit's sister (2015–2016)
- Aditi Dadhich as Bunty (2015–2016)
- Abhishek Singh Pathania / Shresth Kumar as Vyom Sinha: Sharmili's son; Sujeev's step brother; Namita's husband (2015–2016)
- Sudhir Pandey as Dadda: Shanti's brother-in-law (2016)
- Amita Udgata as Laleshwari Sahay / Laliya: Shanti's childhood friend; Riya's Bua Dadi (2015)
- Yaseer Nomani as Munna (2016)
- Vijay Kalvani as Kishan Gupta (2015–2016)
- Kapil Arya as Ajay (2017)
- Shraman Jain as Mohit "Mihir" Pahuja (2015–2016)
- Wasim Mushtaq as Sujeev Sinha: Sharmili's step-son; Vyom's step-brother (2015–2016)
- Sunil Raghuvansh as Bhooshit Chauhan
- Pawan Chopra as Anupam Mathur: Riya's father (2015–2016)
- Neelu Kohli as Sharmili Sinha: Sujeev's step mother: Vyom's mother (2015-2016)
- Puja Sharma as Chanda (2016)
- Abhishek Sharma as Lallan Singh: Bablu's Uncle (2016-2017)
- Varun Jain as Pramod Prasad (2017)
- Ritesh M Shukla as Joker Thief (2017)

== Production ==
In June 2016, Neelu Kohli quit being unhappy with her character shaping up.

In October 2016, Ekta Kaul took a break from the series for her holiday, but soon after she returned, she was diagnosed with dengue and the script was rewritten for her absence. In February 2017, she quit the series for personal reasons and her character was killed after giving birth.

In March 2017, Ananya Khare quit the series stating multiple reasons.

In March 2017, Richa Mukherjee was cast as the new female lead opposite Karam Rajpal . However, after Ekta Kaul and Ananya Khare quit, the ratings declined and the series ended on 5 August 2017.
