= Raj Arjun =

Indian actor (born 1972)

- Born: 8 February 1972 (age 54); Bhopal, Madhya Pradesh, India
- Education: Film and Television Institute of India
- Occupation: Actor
- Years active: 1999–present
- Spouse: Sanya Arjun
- Children: 2, including Sara Arjun

Raj Arjun (born 8 February 1972) is an Indian actor who mainly works in Hindi cinema. He has also worked in Tamil, Malayalam and Telugu cinema. He is the recipient of Zee Cine Awards for Best Actor In A Negative Role and Indian Television Academy Awards for Best Actor.

== Early and personal life ==
Raj Arjun was born on 8 February in Bhopal, Madhya Pradesh in a Sindhi family. He was associated with theatre in Bhopal for multiple years. He is married to Sanya. His daughter Sara Arjun is also an actress.

== Career ==
Arjun made his debut in Hindi film industry with the film Black Friday. He got recognition in the industry through the film Secret Superstar. He made his debut in Tamil film industry with the film Thaandavam. He has also acted in films like Thalaivii and Love Hostel. He made his debut in Telugu film industry with the film Dear Comrade.

== Filmography ==
Key
†	Denotes films that have not yet been released

=== Films ===
List of Raj Arjun film credits
Year	Title	Role	Language	Notes
2002	Company		Hindi	
2004	Black Friday	Akram / Nasir	Hindi	
2004	Gayab	Drunken Guy	Hindi	
2005	D	Bhupesh	Hindi	
2010	Kaalo	Chandan	Hindi	
2011	Shabri	Murad	Hindi	
2011	Khap	Chander	Hindi	
2012	Thaandavam	Kenny Thomas	Tamil	
2012	Rowdy Rathore	Jagdish	Hindi	
2013	Satyagraha	Sangram Singh	Hindi	
2013	Shree	Krishna Kant Desai	Hindi	
2013	Thalaivaa	Bhima's henchman	Tamil	
2016	BHK Bhalla@Halla.Kom	Gagan Bhalla	Hindi	
2016	Traffic	Aslam Bhai	Hindi	
2016	Tutak Tutak Tutiya	Sanjay Kumar	Hindi; Tamil; Telugu	Trilingual film
2017	Raees	Ilyas	Hindi	
2017	Secret Superstar	Farookh Malik	Hindi	
2017	Daddy	Rafique	Hindi	
2019	Dear Comrade	Ramesh Rao	Telugu	
2019	Watchman	Terrorist	Tamil	
2019	Tadbeer		Hindi	
2019	Darklight	Baba	Hindi	
2021	Shershaah	Subedaar Raghunath	Hindi	
2021	Thalaivii	R. N. Veerappan	Hindi	Hindi version
2022	Love Hostel	DCP Sushil Rathi	Hindi	
2024	Article 370	ID Station Chief of Srinagar Khawar Ali	Hindi	
2024	Razakar	Kasim Razvi	Telugu	
2024	Gam Gam Ganesha	Kishore Reddy	Telugu	
2024	Yudhra	Firoz	Hindi	
2025	Match Fixing	Col. Imam	Hindi	
2025	Khajuraho Dreams	Harishchandra Reghuvamshi	Malayalam	
TBA	Rush †	TBA	Hindi	

=== Short films ===
List of Raj Arjun short film credits
Year	Title	Role	Language	Ref.
2010	Misha	Roshan Uncle	Hindi	
2015	Holding Back	Suresh	Hindi	
2018	Irrfan	Irrfan	Hindi	
2018	The Perfect Girl	Shasha's father	Hindi	
2020	Natkhat	Sonu's father	Hindi	
2021	Pilibhit	Siraj	Hindi	
2022	The Miniaturist of Junagadh	Kishorilal Randeria	Hindi	

=== Television ===
Key
†	Denotes television productions that have not yet been released

List of Raj Arjun television credits
Year	Title	Role	Language	Notes
2004	Kumkum - Ek Pyara Sa Bandhan	Jagannath	Hindi	
2007	Durgesh Nandinii	Chandu	Hindi	
2014	Encounter	Dr. Roshan Lal	Hindi	
2018	Karenjit Kaur – The Untold Story of Sunny Leone	Anupam Chaubey	Hindi	
2021	Sabka Sai	Sai Baba	Hindi	
2022	Dr. Arora	Firangi Baba	Hindi	
2022-2023	Jhansi	Caleb	Telugu	

== Awards and nominations ==
List of awards and nominations received by Raj Arjun
Year	Movie	Award	Category	Result	Ref.
2018	Secret Superstar	Zee Cine Awards	Best Actor In A Negative Role	Won	
2021	Sabka Sai	Indian Television Academy Awards	Best Actor	Won	
2021	The Minituarist Of Junagarh	IFFSA Toronto	Best Actor	Won	
2022	Pilibhit	Chitra Bharati Film Festival	Best Actor	Won	
2022	Thalaivii	67th Filmfare Awards	Best Supporting Actor	Nominated	
