= Navniet Sekera =

Indian Police Officer

- Born: 22 October 1971 (age 54); Shikohabad, Firozabad, Uttar Pradesh, India
- Education: B.E. (Computer Science), MBA
- Alma mater: IIT Roorkee, Indian School of Business
- Occupations: Additional Director General (ADG) of Police, Uttar Pradesh
- Years active: 1996–present
- Employer: Government of India
- Organization: Indian Police Service
- Spouse: Pooja singh
- Children: 2
- Awards: President's Police Medal for Distinguished Service (2005) He completed his graduation. President's Police Medal for Meritorious Service(2013); Chief Minister’s award for Innovation(2002); Director General’s Commendation Disc-Silver; Director General’s Commendation Disc-Gold

Navniet Sekera (born 22 October 1971) is a 1996 batch IPS officer of Uttar Pradesh cadre, currently serving as the Additional Director General of Uttar Pradesh Police.

== Early life and education ==
Sekera was born in Shikohabad town in Firozabad district, Uttar Pradesh. His father's name is Manohar Singh Yadav. His wife, Pooja Sekera is a social activist, who works for the empowerment of women against oppression. Sekera studied in All-boys Government school in Shikohabad in Firozabad district, UP. He graduated from IIT Roorkee, in Computer Science and Engineering. He later did an MBA from the Indian School of Business in 2011.

== Career ==
Sekera joined the Indian Police Service in 1996. His first posting was as Assistant Superintendent of Police (ASP) in Gorakhpur. In 2001, he was promoted to the rank of Superintendent of Police. He was promoted as (DIG) Deputy Inspector General of Police in 2012 and as Inspector General of Police in 2014, and was subsequently appointed Inspector General (IG) of Mahila Power Line, Uttar Pradesh.

Sekera is focused on welfare and well being of women and the girl child. It was he who developed and organised the concept of ‘Women Power Line 1090,’. which was started by the UP government in 2012.

A web series Bhaukaal has been created based on Sekera, in which his character is played by TV actor Mohit Raina.

Sekera is one of the board advisors of Akancha Srivastava Foundation. He has worked on many cases with the foundation to address the cyber threats including cyber harassment, cyber stalking, Cyberbullying, cyber grooming, morphing, blackmail, and many more.
