= Sawaare Sabke Sapne... Preeto =

Indian television series

- Genre: Drama
- Created by: Creative Eye
- Developed by: Anjum Abbas
- Written by: Anjum Abbas, Fiazal Akhtar & Dheeraj Sarna
- Directed by: Naresh Malhotra
- Creative director: Sharad Raj
- Starring: See below
- Country of origin: India
- Original language: Hindi
- No. of episodes: 203

Production
- Producer: Dheeraj Kumar
- Production locations: Amritsar; Mumbai
- Running time: 20 minutes
- Production company: Creative Eye Limited

Original release
- Network: Imagine TV
- Release: 4 July 2011 – 11 May 2012

Sawaare Sabke Sapne Preeto (SSSP) is an Indian television series that premiered on Imagine TV on 4 July 2011 and ended abruptly on 11 May 2012. The story is located against a Punjabi backdrop and is based on the lives of five sisters. Set in the picturesque north Indian town of Amritsar, which is also an Indian Air Force base, this is the story of the quirky, lovable Dhillon family. They live in a run-down mansion, having moved to India from Pakistan after the Partition, a generation ago. In many ways the Dhillon family is a typical lower-middle-class Indian family.

At the head of the family is retired school master Gangandeep Dhillon, who lives with his wife Kanwal and five daughters.

== Plot ==
Sawaare Sapke Sapne Preeto is the story of Preeto, third among the five Dhillon sisters. The eldest sister is Jasmeet (Meeta) who is lovable and plump, second is Ishmeet (Ishu) who is quiet and respectful and is considered the prettiest, third is Manpreet (Preeto) who is respectful but always speaks her mind, fourth is Gurbaani (Bani) who is in college and likes to party, and the youngest is Sonu who is in school and is everybody's favorite. Their father's income is not enough to maintain the entire family. Preeto's mother often regrets that she does not have a son who could have supported them all. Hence Preeto decides to contribute to the family income by designing and stitching clothes for clients. Her dream is to get her older sisters married and the younger ones educated.

Meeta is engaged to Bobby but he tries to take advantage of Ishu and the wedding is called off. At her friends' wedding, Preeto meets Rajbeer, an air force officer and they develop feelings for each other. Dhruv, another air force officer, falls in love with Ishu. Dhruv and Ishu's wedding is fixed and Preeto and Rajbeer confess their love to each other. But Preeto's father meets with an accident and loses his job. Preeto decides to break up with Rajbeer to focus on arranging money for Ishu's wedding.

However, Dhruv's parents are unhappy with the wedding. At a family outing in Manali, Rajbeer saves Dhruv's sister Simran and she falls in love with him. In Amritsar, Bani falls in love with a man named Ranjeet but he only wants to destroy Rajbeer. He sells Bani off to some goons but Preeto and Rajbeer are able to save her and expose Ranjeet's true intentions. Meanwhile, Preeto's Biji finds out about Preeto and Rajbeer and encourages Preeto to fight for her love.

Dhruv and Simran's mother, Neelam, blackmails Preeto that if she confesses her love to Rajbeer, Neelam would make sure Dhruv divorces Ishu. Conflicted, Preeto decides to fake marriage with Sunny, a cousin of Pankaj's (Meeta's husband) who loves Preeto but knows about her feelings for Rajbeer. But one day Rajbeer overhears Preeto talking to herself and realizes that her marriage is fake and she still loves him.

== Cast ==
=== Main ===
- Ankita Sharma as Manpreet "Preeto" Dhillon: Kavaljit and Gagandeep's third daughter; Meeta, Ishu, Bani and Sonu's sister; Rajbeer's lover (2011–2012)
- Aditya Redij as Rajbeer Singh: Preeto's lover (2011–2012)

=== Recurring ===
- Ira Soni as Ishmeet "Ishu" Ahluwalia: Kavaljit and Gagandeep's second daughter; Preeto, Meeta, Bani and Sonu's sister; Dhruv's wife (2011−2012)
- Divya Bhatnagar as Jasmeet "Meeta" Ambrela: Kavaljit and Gagandeep's eldest daughter; Ishu, Preeto, Bani and Sonu's sister; Pankaj's wife (2011–2012)
- Devoleena Bhattacharjee as Gurbani "Bani" Dhillon: Kavaljit and Gagandeep's fourth daughter; Meeta, Ishu, Preeto and Sonu's sister (2011−2012)
- Mahima Makwana as Sonam "Sonu" Dhillon; Kavaljit and Gagandeep's youngest daughter; Meeta, Ishu, Preeto and Bani's sister (2011−2012)
- Kanan Malhotra as Dhruv Ahluwalia: Neelam and Kulbhushan's son; Simmi's brother; Ishu's husband (2011–2012)
- Rohit Mehta as Mr. Kumar administrative officer (2012)
- Pavitra Punia as Simran "Simmi" Ahluwalia: Neelam and Kulbhushan's daughter; Dhruv's sister (2011−2012)
- Sailesh Gulabani as Pankaj Ambrela: Sunny's cousin; Meeta's husband (2011−2012)
- Shresth Kumar as Shivansh "Sunny" Ambrela: Pankaj's cousin; Preeto's ex-fiancé (2012)
- Ujjwal Rana as Baljeet "Bobby" Singh: Meeta's former fiancé (2011−2012)
- Susheel Parashar as Gagandeep Dhillon: Kavaljit's husband; Meeta, Ishu, Preeto, Bani and Sonu's father (2011–2012)
- Nitika Anand as Kavaljit Kaur Dhillon: Gagandeep's wife; Meeta, Ishu, Preeto, Bani and Sonu's mother (2011–2012)
- Ritwika Gupta as Aisha Sood: Simmi's friend & Rajbir’s first wife (2011–2012)
- Vijay Aidasani as Kulbhushan Ahluwalia; Dhruv and Simmi's father (2011−2012)
- Aradhana Uppal as Neelam Ahluwalia: Kulbhushan's wife; Dhruv and Simmi's mother (2011−2012)

=== Guest stars ===
- Himesh Reshammiya as himself for the promotion of Bodyguard and Damadamm! (2011)
