= Bhaukaal (TV series) =

- Genre: Crime drama
- Written by: Akash Mohimen; Jay Sheela Bansal; Rohit Chouhan
- Directed by: Jatin Wagle
- Starring: Mohit Raina; Abhimanyu Singh; Siddhanth Kapoor; Bidita Bag; Gulki Joshi; Ravi Pandey; Sanyam srivastav
- Composers: Gourav Dasgupta & Roshin Balu
- Country of origin: India
- Original language: Hindi
- No. of seasons: 2
- No. of episodes: 20

Production
- Producers: Sameer Nair; Deepak Segal; Pammi Baweja; Harman Baweja; Vicky Bahri
- Production location: India
- Editor: Umesh Gupta
- Camera setup: Multi-camera
- Production companies: Applause Entertainment; Baweja Movies

Original release
- Network: MX Player
- Release: 11 May 2020 – present

Bhaukaal is a 2020 Hindi-language crime drama web series directed by Jatin Wagle for MX Player. It is produced by Sameer Nair, Deepak Segal, Pammi Baweja and Harman Baweja and Vicky Bahri under Applause Entertainment and Baweja Movies Production.

The series stars Mohit Raina, Abhimanyu Singh, Siddhanth Kapoor, Bidita Bag, and Pradeep Nagar in key roles.

== Plot ==
Naveen Sikhera (Mohit Raina) promoted to Senior Superintendent of Police (SSP) and is transferred to the city. Sikhera's transfer is a punishment more than a promotion. The city is ruled by two gangs Shaukeen gang in the east and the Dedha brothers rule the west. The two gangs have divided up turf to carry on with their businesses. These two gangs' terror is on the peak, such that even the local police never dare to question them. IPS officer Naveen Sikhera makes his own way to clean the city as the new SSP.

== Cast ==
- Mohit Raina as SSP Navniet Sekera
- Abhimanyu Singh as Shaukeen
- Upen Chauhan as Constable Rajesh Yadav
- Gulki Joshi as Reporter Neha
- Bidita Bag as Nazneen
- Siddhanth Kapoor as Chintu Dedha
- Pradeep Nagar as Pintu Dedha
- Shahab Khan as Dayanad Sikhera, Navin's Father
- Rahul Baisla as Gurjan
- Sunny Hinduja as Farukh Qureshi
- Rashmi Rajput as Puja Sikhera
- Sanyam Srivastav as Karim
- Ravi Pandey as Salim / Iftekhar
