= R K Vij =

Indian police service officer (born 1961)

R K Vij Indian Police Service
- Born: 22 December 1961 (age 64)
- Education: M.Tech (civil engineering), MBA, C.H.R, MCA, PGDDM, LL.M, M.A.
- Alma mater: NIT Kurukshetra; National Law University, Jodhpur; IGNOU
- Spouse: Deepshikha Vij
- Police career
- Country: India
- Department: Chhattisgarh Police
- Branch: SDG Finance Provisions & Technical Services
- Service years: 1988–2021
- Status: Retired
- Rank: Director General of Police
- Cadre: Chhattisgarh
- Awards: Smart Policing Award

R K Vij is a 1988 batch (41 RR) retired IPS Officer of the Chhattisgarh Cadre. He retired from the post of Director General of Police on December 31, 2021.

Vij is one of the board advisors of Akancha Srivastava Foundation. He has worked on many cases with the foundation to address the address the cyber threats including cyber harassment, cyber stalking, cyberbullying, and others.

He is also the columnist on notable news websites such as The Hindu, The Indian Express, New Indian Express and The Wire.
