= Ishq Ki Dastaan – Naagmani =

Indian supernatural television series

- Genre: Romance; Supernatural; Fiction
- Showrunner: Aarooshee Sood
- Starring: Aleya Ghosh; Aditya Redij; Pavitra Punia; Karam Rajpal
- Country of origin: India
- Original language: Hindi
- No. of seasons: 3
- No. of episodes: 438

Production
- Production locations: Mumbai, India
- Running time: 22 minutes
- Production company: Story Square Productions

Original release
- Network: Dangal
- Release: 13 June 2022 – 4 November 2023

Ishq Ki Dastaan – Naagmani is an Indian Hindi Romance, Supernatural, Fiction Indian television series produced by Story Square Productions which was premiered on 13 June 2022 on Dangal. The series stars Aleya Ghosh, Pavitra Punia, Aditya Redij and Karam Rajpal.

== Series overview ==
Season	No. of episodes	Originally broadcast (India)	
Season	No. of episodes	First aired	Last aired
1	198	13 June 2022	28 January 2023
2	180	30 January 2023	26 August 2023
3	60	28 August 2023	4 November 2023

== Plot ==
Ishq Ki Dastaan - Naagmani embodies an immortal love story of two supernatural beings who fall prey to the greed of a witch. It captures a tale of love between the shape-shifting naag - naagin and the never-ending greed of the evil witch seeking immortality by acquiring the life-giving jewel possessed by the naagin. Under the shadow of a witch, will a wishful/shape-shifting cobra be able to write their great love story.

== Cast ==
=== Main ===
- Aleya Ghosh as
  - Paro Shankar Rana / Rupa Dev Mishra: Shankar's widow; Dev's wife; Bulbul's mother (2022–2023) (Dead)
  - Naagrani Paro: Paro's previous birth (2022) (Dead)
  - Parvati: Paro's rebirth; Shivay's wife (2023)
- Pavitra Punia as
  - Mohini: The Witch; Durjan and Dev's ex–wife
  - Damini: Mohini's rebirth
- Aditya Redij as
  - Shankar Rana: Paro's husband; Durjan's son; Babli's elder brother; Bulbul's father (2022–2023) (Dead)
  - Naagraj Shankar: Shankar Rana's previous birth (2022) (Dead)
- Karam Rajpal as
  - Dev Mishra: Rupa's husband; Mohini's ex–husband; Devika's son; Bulbul's adopted father (2023) (Dead)
  - Shivay: Dev's rebirth; Parvati 's husband (2023)

==== Recurring ====
- Shubhalaxmi Das as Nanda: Pappy's mother (2022–2023)
- Neha Yadav as Rambha: Manmohan's wife
- Rupa Divetia as Mrs. Rana "Dadi" (2022–2023)
- Garima Verma as Jyothi: Shankar's friend (2022)
- Mehul Kajaria (2022)
- Aditya Shukla as Manmohan: Rambha's husband; Mohini's younger brother (2022–2023)
- Shashank Sharma as Pappy Singh: Nanda's son; Babli's husband (2022–2023)
- Nandini Maurya as Babli Rana / Babli Pappy Singh: Durjan's daughter; Shankar's younger sister; Pappy's wife (2022–2023)
- Imran Khan as Durjan Rana: Shankar's and Babli's father (2022–2023)
- Syed Ashraf Karim as Girdhari Kaka (2022–2023)
- Paramveer Singh as Govind (Child incarnation of Bhagwan Shri Krishna)(2022)
- Riddhi Sharma as Bulbul Shankar Rana: Paro and Shankar's daughter; Dev's adopted daughter (2023)
- Dhananjay Pandey as Bhola (2023)
- Swati Pansare as Devika Mishra: Dev's mother(2023)
- Anshul Bammi as Raman (2023)
- Ahmad Harhash as Rohan Mishra (2023)
- Bobby Khanna as Chachaji (2023)
- Dev Rathore (2023)
- Pallavi Rao as Shalini (2023)
- Jitendra Trehan as Mr. Mishra: Dev's father (2023)
- Krishnakant Singh Bundela as Naag Guru (2021)
- Kanan Malhotra as Kartik (2023)
- Urvi Upadhyay as Chikki: Paro's fake daughter (2023)
- Prerna Runthala as Heena
- Sikandar Kharbanda as Ujjwal (2023) (Dead)
- Preeti Gandwani as Naagrani: Parvati's mother (2023)

=== Cameo appearances ===
- Vaibhavi Hankare as Mishri from Sindoor Ki Keemat (2022)
- Khushbu Tiwari as Mehak from Baazi Ishq Ki (2023)

== Soundtrack ==
The show's romantic track "Janam Pe Janam" received positive response, and also reached over one million views on YouTube.

Janam Pe Janam

Soundtrack album by Soumee Sailsh and Rahul Jain
- Released: 30 June 2022
- Genres: Romance; Soundtrack
- Length: 3:49
- Language: Hindi
- Label: Enterr10 Television Network

Tracklisting
No.	Title	Singer(s)	Length
1.	"Janam Pe Janam"	Soumee Sailsh and Rahul Jain	3:49
2.	"Naagin"	Soumee Sailsh	3:05
