= The Miniaturist of Junagadh =

- Directed by: Kaushal Oza
- Based on: story of Stefan Zweig
- Release date: 2022

The Miniaturist of Junagadh is a 2022 short film directed by Kaushal Oza that depicts the final moments of retired miniaturist Husyn Naqqash, played by Naseeruddin Shah, and his family. The plot of the film charts the family's final day in their ancestral home in the princely state of Junagadh.

== Cast ==
- Naseeruddin Shah as Husyn Naqqash
- Rasika Dugal as Nurhayat, Husyn's daughter
- Raj Arjun as Kishorilal Randeria
- Padmavati Rao as Sakina, Husyn's wife
- Uday Chandra as Tangewala
