= Qayaamat Se Qayaamat Tak =

Indian television series

- Genre: Drama; Romance; Thriller
- Based on: November Rain
- Written by: Abhigyan Jha; Mrinal Jha
- Screenplay by: Siddarth Halaswamy; Smriti Chugh; Sachin Sharma
- Directed by: Deeksha R.J. Kushwaha; Mrinal Jha; Hasan Tahsin Rafsan
- Starring: See below
- Opening theme: Qayaamat Se Qayaamat Tak
- Country of origin: India
- Original language: Hindi
- No. of seasons: 1
- No. of episodes: 85

Production
- Producer: Mrinal Jha
- Camera setup: Multi-camera
- Running time: 22 minutes
- Production company: BBC Studios India

Original release
- Network: Colors TV
- Release: 29 January – 24 May 2024

Qayaamat Se Qayaamat Tak (transl. From apocalypse to apocalypse) is an Indian Hindi-language television romantic drama series that premiered from 29 January 2024 to 24 May 2024 on Colors TV and streams digitally on JioCinema. Based on the novel November Rain, by Abhigyan Jha, the series starred Trupti Mishra and Karam Rajpal.

== Plot ==
18 years old Poornima, who is raised in a poor household, has taken up responsibility of her family. She makes money by selling flowers. She has been hardened from her upbringing and has a no-nonsense attitude. Raj is the heir of the Raghuvanshi family, who is adored by all his family members. He is engaged to Shaina, whom his parents see as being equal in status to him. Despite all odds, Raj and Poornima fall in love with each other. Initially, Raj's parents oppose their union because Poornima is poor, but they finally accept her after seeing her dedication to Raj and the family. Damayanti declares that Poornima is Raj's "raksha kavach" and she will save him from all harm, which Poornima had been doing.

One fateful day, Poornima and Raj have an accident that was planned by Shaina, who is obsessed with Raj, and a masked person. Poornima sees her murderers before dying, but is unable to tell anyone. However, she promises Raj that she will return to fulfill their love story. Unfortunately, they find Chirag by the truck that caused the accident and arrest him.

20 years later, Poornima has reincarnated as Poonam. Poonam sees visions of her past life, but does not realize it as such. Poonam wants to become a doctor and tutors kids on the side. Kuhu, Raj and Shaina's daughter, becomes attached to Poonam, and tricks Shaina into hiring Poonam as her nanny. Poonam arrives at Raghuvanshi house, but Raj refuses to believe that she is his Poornima. Raj has become an alcoholic, who is distanced from his family. However, he cares deeply about Kuhu, who is asthmatic.

Unfamiliar with her past, Poonam promises to reunite Raj and Shaina as per Kuhu's wish. However, she finds out that Shaina has an extra marital affair with Vicky. Poonam tries to expose Shaina, but Shaina tricks her into believing that she wants a second chance with Raj. Gradually, Poonam's visions become clearer and she recognizes Raj as the man in her visions. She also finds a picture of Poornima and Raj's wedding and is shocked to see how her face resembles Poornima's.

Later, Poonam realizes that Shaina lied to her and plans to usurp all of Raj's property. Poonam is looking for proof when she learns that Shaina is pregnant with Vicky's child. Shaina, afraid of being ousted from the house, plans to murder Poonam by burying Poonam alive with the car. However, Raj saves Poonam. Through this ordeal, Poonam remembers her past life. However, as she still has no proof, she pretends to have lost her memory and acts as a princess from a faraway kingdom. Eventually, she is able to expose Shaina.

In a shocking turn, the police reveal that Shaina is dead and that Raj killed her. Poonam manages to acquit Raj and she reveals her truth to everyone. Raj and Poonam have a heartfelt reunion. Poonam also tells them about Shaina and the masked person. Poonam seeks the masked person's identity. Initially, she doubts Nirvan is the masked person and tells Sumitra. However, the masked person is revealed to be Raviraj. Raj and Poonam find him wounded and he dies before he can say anything. The family are surprised by the truth and Nirvan is heartbroken that his father is a murderer.

All seems to be going well finally, when Kuhu suddenly turns antagonistic towards Poonam. She despises Poonam for lying to her about uniting her parents, but planning to marry Raj herself. But later she accepts Poonam as her mother. Raj suggests them to concentrate on their studies. In a shocking twist of events, Sumitra is revealed to be the masked person. Sumitra reveals how Haribol swapped her stillborn child with Damayanti's illegitimate son, and threatened Sumitra to never reveal this to anyone. Haribol announced that Raj would become the Raghuvanshi family's heir and continue the lineage. Sumitra was bitter about raising a child that was not hers, because she had her biological son, Shrey, she despised Raj even more, as he took everything that was rightfully Shrey's as the eldest child of Gururaj.

Sumitra plots to create a rift between Raj and Poonam through Poonam's closeness with a student of medical college named Rajneesh. Raj starts feeling insecure about his age as Poonam is 18 years his junior.

== Cast ==
=== Main ===
- Trupti Mishra as
  - Poornima Raghuvanshi (née Sahariya): Radha's elder daughter; Rati's sister; Rajneesh's first wife (2024) (Dead)
  - Poonam Raghuvanshi (née Rajlakshmi Iyer): Poornima's reincarnation; Malini's daughter; Netra's cousin; Rajneesh's third wife; Kuhu's foster mother (2024)
- Karam Rajpal as Dr. Rajneesh "Raj" Raghuvanshi: Damayanti's illegitimate son; Sumitra and Gururaj's adoptive son; Shrey, Geetu and Jai's adoptive brother; Poornima's widower; Shaina's ex-husband; Kuhu's foster father; Poonam's husband (2024)

=== Recurring ===
- Madirakshi Mundle as Shaina: Rajneesh's ex-wife; Kuhu's mother; Vicky's wife; Sumitra's accomplice in Poornima and Raviraj's murder (2024)
- Riddhi Sharma as Kuhu Raghuvanshi: Shaina's daughter; Vicky's stepdaughter; Poonam and Raj's foster daughter (2024)
- Kamalika Guha Thakurta as Damayanti Raghuvanshi: Haribol's eldest daughter; Gururaj and Raviraj's sister; Rajneesh and Chirag's mother; Shrey, Geetu, Jai and Nirvan's paternal aunt (2024)
- Meghan Jadhav as Chirag Raghuvanshi: Damayanti's younger son; Rajneesh's younger half-brother; Geetu, Shrey, Jai and Nirvan's cousin (2024)
- Pallavi Rao as Sumitra Raghuvanshi: Gururaj's wife; Geetu, Shrey and Jai's mother; Raj's adoptive mother; Poornima and Raviraj's murderer (2024)
- Amit Kaushik as Gururaj Raghuvanshi: Haribol's younger son; Damayanti and Raviraj's brother; Sumitra's husband; Geetu, Shrey and Jai's father; Raj's adoptive father (2024)
- Simran Singh as Geetu Raghuvanshi: Sumitra and Gururaj's eldest daughter; Shrey and Jai's sister; Raj's adoptive sister; Tony's lover (2024)
- Vipin Gurjar as Inspector Shrey Raghuvanshi: Sumitra and Gururaj's younger son; Geetu and Jai's brother; Raj's adoptive brother (2024)
- Dhantejas Pandit as Jai Raghuvanshi: Sumitra and Gururaj's youngest son; Shrey and Geetu's brother; Raj's adoptive brother (2024)
- Bobby Vats as Raviraj Raghuvanshi: Haribol's youngest son; Damayanti and Gururaj's brother; Guneeta's husband; Nirvan's father (2024) (Dead)
- Aartii Kandpal as Guneeta Raghuvanshi: Raviraj's widow; Nirvan's mother (2024)
- Gaurav Sharma as Nirvan Raghuvanshi: Raviraj and Guneeta's son (2024)
- Pankaj Berry as Haribol Raghuvanshi: Damayanti, Gururaj and Raviraj's father; Geetu, Shrey and Jai's paternal grandfather; Raj and Chirag's maternal grandfather (2024)
- Unknown as Malini Rajlakshmi Iyer: Poonam's mother; Netra's aunt (2024)
- Unknown as Malini's brother; Netra's father; Poonam's uncle (2024)
- Unknown as Netra's mother (2024)
- Pooja Somani as Netra Iyer: Poonam's cousin (2024)
- Ajay Arya as Tony D'Souza: Geetu's boyfriend (2024)
- Ankit Raj as Vicky: Shaina's second husband; Kuhu's stepfather (2024)
- Adarsh Chaudhary as Library boy (2024)
- Unknown as Rajneesh: A student of medical college; Poonam's classmate; Sumitra's right hand (2024)
- Nandini Karmakar as Rati Sahariya: Radha's younger daughter; Poornima's sister (2024)
- Jyoti Gauba as Radha Sahariya: Poornima and Rati's mother (2024)
- Unknown as Murli: Poornima's obsessive one-sided lover (2024)
- Unknown as Shaina's mother and Kuhu's maternal grandmother (2024)

== Production ==
=== Development ===
Qayaamat Se Qayaamat Tak is produced by BBC Studios India and is based on the novel, November Rain, which is written by Abhigyan Jha. The series title is inspired by the 1988 Bollywood movie, Qayamat Se Qayamat Tak. The series also showcases the reunion of two lovers after rebirth.

=== Casting ===
Trupti Mishra and Karam Rajpal were cast to play the leads, Poornima and Raj. In February 2024, post the leap, Poornima died and Trupti then played Poonam.

Pallavi Rao was cast to play Rajneesh's mother, Sumitra and Jyoti Gauba was cast to play Poornima's mother, Radha. In February 2024, Madirakshi Mundle was cast to play Shaina opposite Rajpal. That same month, Riddhi Sharma was cast to play Raj and Shaina's daughter, Kuhu.

=== Filming ===
The series is primarily set in Ujjain, Madhya Pradesh. The initial portion was shot in Ujjain, including few scenes at Mahakaleshwar Temple. The remaining series was shot at Naigaon.

=== Cancellation ===
The series went off air on 24 May 2024, due to low TRPs, owing to Indian Premier League.
