= Gulki Joshi =

Indian television actress

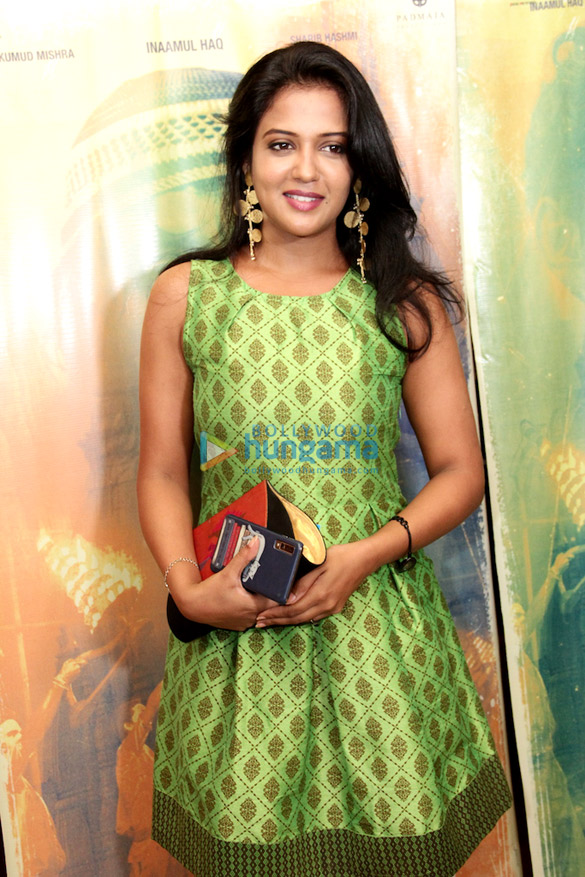
- Joshi in 2019
- Born: Indore, India
- Education: Mithibai College
- Occupation: Actress
- Years active: 2011–present
- Known for: Phir Subah Hogi; Nadaan Parindey Ghar Aaja; Maddam Sir

Khyati Joshi, known by her stage name Gulki Joshi, is an Indian actress who works in Hindi television and is known for portraying Haseena Malik in Sony SAB's comedy series Maddam Sir.

== Early life ==
Joshi belongs to a Marathi Brahmin family.

== Career ==
She was first seen in Zee TV's Phir Subah Hogi and in Life OK's Nadaan Parindey Ghar Aaja. She also portrayed the role of Sawri in Colors TV's Ek Shringaar-Swabhiman and Naina in Zee TV's Piyaa Albela. She starred as Devaki in &TV's mythological drama Paramavatar Shri Krishna. She played the role of a reporter in MX Player's Bhaukaal.

She has also acted in stage plays and has been active on the theatre circuit. She was also seen in "Pyar Mein Twist", a theatre play, opposite Ankit Raj.

In 2019, she was seen playing Ambika in Zee Theatre's play Purush opposite Ashutosh Rana and Nakkash Movie. From 2020 to 2023, she played a Lucknow-based cop Haseena Mallik in Sony SAB's Maddam Sir, which has proved to be her most successful role till date.

In 2025, Gulki Joshi was seen in Hasratein 2, which was streaming on Hungama OTT app.

From 2026, Gulki Joshi is portraying Dr. Srishti Agarwal in the television series Hui Gumm Yaadein – Ek Doctor, Do Zindagiyaan . The show features her in a lead role as the CEO of the hospital and the former wife of Dr. Dev. The series explores the emotional journey of her. This project marks another notable addition to her television career.

== Filmography ==
=== Films ===
Year	Title	Role(s)	Notes	Ref.
2019	Nakkash	Sabiha Bano	Lead role	
2021	Bekhudi	Neha	Character role	
2026	Echos of Silence	Sarah	Short film(Lead role)	

=== Television ===
Year	Title	Role(s)	Notes	Ref.
2011	Crime Patrol	Gulki	Episode: "The Tainted Record"	
2012–2013	Phir Subah Hogi	Sugni Singh	Lead role	
2014	Nadaan Parindey Ghar Aaja	Meher Kaur	Lead role	
2015	Adaalat	Advocate Swarna Talwar	Episode: "Jurassic Jazeera"	
2015–2016	Piya Rangrezz	Dr. Aaradhya	Lead role	
2017–2019	Paramavatar Shri Krishna	Devaki	Lead role	
2017	Ek Shringaar Swabhimaan	Savri	Negative character	
2017–2018	Piyaa Albela	Naina Goel	Negative character	
2018	Laal Ishq	Kamna	Episode 22	
2019	Hum Saaf Saaf Hai	Archana	Lead role	
2020–2023	Maddam Sir	Haseena Mallik ("Maddam Sir")	Lead role	
2026	Hui Gumm Yaadein – Ek Doctor, Do Zindagiyaan	Dr. Srishty Agarwal	Lead Role	

==== Special appearances ====
Year	Title	Role	Notes	Ref.
2020	Tera Kya Hoga Alia	Haseena Mallik ("Maddam Sir")	Episode 3	Guest appearance
2021	Hero – Gayab Mode On	Haseena Mallik ("Maddam Sir")	Crossover with Maddam Sir	Guest appearance
2021	Ziddi Dil Maane Na	Haseena Mallik ("Maddam Sir")	Crossover with Maddam Sir	Guest appearance
2021	Tera Yaar Hoon Main	Haseena Mallik ("Maddam Sir")	Crossover with Maddam Sir	Guest appearance
2021, 2024	Wagle Ki Duniya	Haseena Mallik ("Maddam Sir")	Crossover with Maddam Sir	Guest appearance
2022	Good Night India	Haseena Mallik ("Maddam Sir")	Episodes 29/103	
2023	Vanshaj	Haseena Mallik ("Maddam Sir")	Cameo	

=== Web series ===
Year	Title	Role(s)	Notes	Ref.
2020–2022	Bhaukaal	Neha	Amazon Mxplayer	
2021	Sabka Sai	Khajri	Amazon Mxplayer	
2025	Hasratein 2	Neha	Hungama OTT	
2025	Rishton Ka Chakravyuh	Malti, Mallika	Hungama OTT	
2025	Rented Rishta	Lekha Parekh	Microdrama	
2026	7 lifelines to cheat death	Yamika	Microdrama	

=== Theatre ===
Year	Title	Role(s)	Notes	Ref.
2017	Agnipankh	Sunita		
2019	Kaalchakra	Leela		
2019	Purush	Ambika	Zee Theatre Play	
2023	Pyar Mein Twist	Avni	Theatre Play	
2023	Hello Papa		Producer & Performer	
2025	Kaneez	Meher	Theatre Play	

== Awards and nominations ==
Year	Show	Award	Category	Result	Ref.
2012	Phir Subah Hogi	Zee Rishtey Awards	Favourite Popular Face (Female)	Nominated	
2021	Maddam Sir	Indian Television Academy Awards	Best Actress Popular (Drama)	Nominated	
2022	Maddam Sir	Indian Television Academy Awards	Best Actress in a Comic role (Jury)	Nominated	
2026	Hui Gumm Yaadein – Ek Doctor, Do Zindagiyaan	Indian Television Academy Awards	Best Actress Popular (Drama)	Nominated	

== See also ==
- List of Indian television actresses
- List of Hindi television actresses
