= Nadaan Parindey Ghar Aaja =

- Directed by: Imtiaz Punjabi And Govind Panwar
- Starring: Karam Rajpal; Gulki Joshi
- Country of origin: India
- Original language: Hindi
- No. of seasons: 1
- No. of episodes: 122

Production
- Producers: Imtiaz Punjabi and Chokas Bhardwaj
- Production location: Mohali
- Running time: Approx. 24 minutes

Original release
- Network: Life OK
- Release: 7 April – 26 September 2014

Nadaan Parindey Ghar Aaja is an Indian drama television series that aired on Life OK. It premiered on 7 April 2014.

== Synopsis ==
Sameer Atwal and his family live near the India-Pakistan border. A happy-go-lucky young man, Sameer's life takes a 180-degree turn when he joins the Indian army. Although Sameer joins the army to be able to marry his beloved Meher, he is quickly sent to war against Pakistan. In the war, his brother Purab shoots and kills him because he is also in love with Meher.

Sameer is sent back to the India-Pakistan border after 6 months. Purab doubts that "Sameer" is the real Sameer, but everyone else is convinced. Purab's doubts are confirmed, and Sameer is not the real Sameer. Instead, the impostor, Iqbal, was sent by Pakistan's Agent Malik on a secret mission. Iqbal gradually falls in love with Meher. However, Malik orders Iqbal to kill Meher as she is an obstacle to Iqbal's mission. Iqbal feels conflicted about his love for Meher and his mission. Purab confesses his love to Meher, but she rejects him to marry "Sameer" (Iqbal) the next day.

Bebe then realizes that the man she loves is not her real son, but has her son's face. Iqbal, as Sameer, takes Meher to the temple and marries her. Iqbal begins to torture Bebe not to tell this truth to anyone otherwise the real Sameer, who is imprisoned, will be killed in Pakistan. Purab plays with Minty to get revenge on Meher, as he knows that Minty likes him.

Soon, Iqbal's father in Pakistan goes to visit his son in Jail. He visits Sameer, mistakenly thinking Sameer is Iqbal. He then calls Iqbal in India and informs him that Iqbal and Sameer are actually twins and that Bebe is actually both Sameer's and Iqbal's birth mother. Iqbal feels guilty for torturing Bebe and for what he did with Meher.

He decides to bring Sameer back from Pakistan, but first he apologizes to Meher and they consummate their marriage. Iqbal leaves the following night for Pakistan. Meher and Bebe try to stop him but in vain. Iqbal reaches the jail where Sameer is and with the help of their father they switch places. Sameer returns to India and is devastated to learn that Meher loves Iqbal. However, they resume their friendship and try to adjust.

They learn on the news that Iqbal has been hanged as a traitor. Meher is devastated as she is pregnant with Iqbal's child. Sameer and Bebe take care of her during her pregnancy, but Meher dies during childbirth. Sameer and Bebe promise to take care of the baby, and they name him Iqbal.

== Cast ==
- Karam Rajpal as Sameer/Ameer (Iqbal) Atwal
- Gulki Joshi as Meher Kaur (Indian)
- Viraj Kapoor as Balli
- Nikhil Chadda as Purab Bajwa
- Aman Singh as Bunty
- Roshni Sahota as Minty
- Tanushree Kaushal as Balbir / Bebe
- Mannat Singh as Nimmi Massi
- Parandeep Kainth (Guest Appearance)
- Kanwalpreet Singh
