= Akancha Srivastava Foundation =

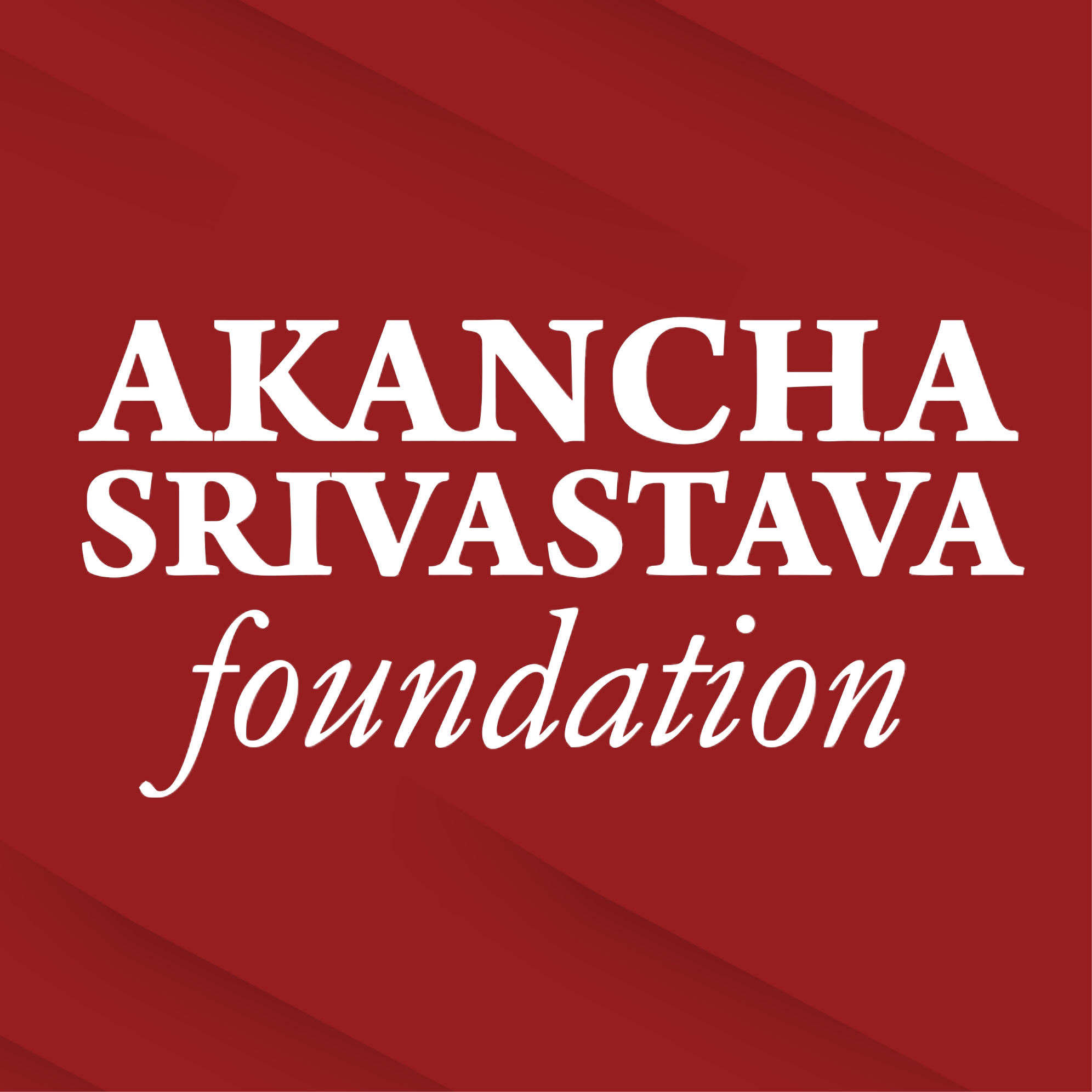
- Founder: Akancha Srivastava
- Founded at: Maharashtra
- Type: Public Cyber Safety or Public Safety
- Registration no.: U93090MH2017NPL301263
- Legal status: Not-For-Profit
- Location: Mumbai, India
- Website: akanchasrivastava.org

Akancha Srivastava Foundation is an 80G certified, non-profit organization established in 2017 by Akancha Srivastava. The Foundation works across India to promote cyber safety education and digital empowerment.

== History ==
Akancha Srivastava Foundation was established in 2017 to address the urgent national need for structured cyber safety education and digital literacy. Since then, the Foundation has built one of India’s largest grassroots movements in this domain. It has conducted over 1,000 workshops across schools, colleges, universities, and professional institutions, reaching millions of students, parents, educators, and working professionals.

The Foundation has formally collaborated with multiple state police departments across India to develop training modules, conduct joint awareness drives, and assist in complaint redressal mechanisms. It has also trained members of the Indian Army in cyber awareness and digital forensics. Senior educators and government officials, including IAS officers, have supported and contributed to the Foundation’s programs, making it a significant force in institutional cyber safety education.

== Activities ==
Akancha Srivastava Foundation works to address the cyber threats including cyber harassment, cyber stalking, Cyberbullying cyber grooming, morphing, blackmail, Voyeurism, online impersonation, financial crimes, deepfakes, and digital detention.

The Foundation operated a 24x7 helpline that was recognized and supported by police departments across several Indian states, providing real-time assistance to individuals in distress.

== Campaign & Awareness ==
=== AI-Powered Digital Assistant ===
It was launched in 2018 and developed in collaboration with Haptik, this AI-driven tool was designed to educate users about various forms of cyber threats.

=== Workshops ===
Conducted in schools, colleges, and professional spaces, these sessions have focused on digital hygiene, safe internet practices, and awareness of cyber laws and citizen rights.

== Board of Advisors ==
The honorary Board of Advisors of the Akancha Srivastava Foundation has included a distinguished panel of senior professionals from law enforcement, academia, industry, and public service. These individuals have lent their expertise to guide the Foundation’s strategic initiatives and scale its outreach in the field of cyber safety and digital literacy. Notable members have included R K Vij, Special Director General of Police, Chhattisgarh; Navniet Sekera, Additional Director General of Police, Uttar Pradesh; and Krishna Prakash, Additional Director General of Police, Maharashtra.

In addition to Law enforcement leadership, the advisory board has drawn support from prominent voices in education and entrepreneurship. Poonam Verma, Principal of Delhi University’s Shaheed Sukhdev College of Business Studies, has contributed to the Foundation’s academic outreach strategy. Among the Foundation’s supporters from the private sector over the years, are Vijay Shekhar Sharma, founder of Paytm, and Dr Ritesh Malik, founder of Innov8.

The board has also benefitted from the association of Princess Diya Kumari, Member of Parliament from Vidhyadhar Nagar, who brought a public policy perspective to the mission.
