= Sabka Sai =

Upcoming Hindi Web Series

- Genre: Mythological
- Directed by: Ajit Bhairavkar
- Starring: Raj Arjun; Mohammad Samad; Akash Sinha; Gulki Joshi; Rohit Phalke; Manoj Kolhatkar; Asheesh Kapur
- Country of origin: India
- Original language: Hindi
- No. of seasons: 1
- No. of episodes: 10

Production
- Producer: Bobby Bedi
- Production location: India

Original release
- Network: MX Player
- Release: 26 August 2021

Sabka Sai is an Indian web series directed by Ajit Bhairavkar. The series stars Raj Arjun, Mohammad Samad, Akash Sinha, Gulki Joshi, Rohit Phalke and Manoj Kolhatkar. The series was released on 26 August 2021.

== Cast ==
- Raj Arjun as Shirdi Sai Baba
- Mohammad Samad as Young Sai Baba
- Aakash Sinha as Jagya
- Gulki Joshi as Kajri
- Rohit Phalke as Om
- Manoj Kolhatkar as Vaidyaraj Kulkarni
- Asheesh Kapur as Toddywala

== Release ==
The official trailer of the web series was launched on 17 August 2021 by MX Player on Amazon Prime
