= Navrangi Re! =

Indian Hindi-language television drama

- Starring: Aamir Ali; Vaishnavi Dhanraj; Raju Kher; Manmohan Tiwari; Kanan Malhotra
- Country of origin: India
- Original language: Hindi
- No. of seasons: 1

Production
- Production company: BBC Worldwide

Original release
- Network: Colors Rishtey
- Release: 2 February – 28 April 2019

Navrangi Re! is an Indian Hindi-language television drama on urban sanitation broadcast by Colors rishtey. The show went on air on 2 February 2019.

== Cast ==
- Aamir Ali as Vishwas
- Vaishnavi Dhanraj as Chitralekha
- Garima Jain as Maneka
- Sushmita Mukherjee as Rajrani
- Raju Kher
- Manmohan Tiwari as K Seth
- Kanan Malhotra as Vivek Oberoi
- Anil Kapoor as himself
- Anugrah Agnihotri as Dhaba wala
