= Rab Se Sohna Isshq =

- Genre: Indian soap opera Drama
- Created by: Jay Production
- Written by: Dilip Jha; Archita Vishwas; Meesha Gautam; Mahesh Pandey; Anjum Abbas; Divy Nidhi Sharma; Aparajita Sharma; Priya Ramanathan
- Directed by: Mohit K Jha; Rohit Dwiwedi
- Creative director: Mrinal Tripathi
- Starring: Ekta Kaul; Ashish Sharma; Kanan Malhotra
- Composer: Raju Singh
- Country of origin: India
- Original languages: Hindi; Punjabi; English
- No. of seasons: 1
- No. of episodes: 232

Production
- Producers: Jay Mehta; Kinnari Mehta
- Production locations: Punjab; London
- Cinematography: Ashish Sharma
- Production company: Jay Production

Original release
- Network: Zee TV
- Release: 16 July 2012 – 14 June 2013

Rab Se Sohna Isshq, known in English as Eternal Love, is an Indian soap opera produced by Jay Mehta's Jay Production, which aired on Zee TV from Monday to Friday. Ashish Sharma played the male lead along with Kanan Malhotra. Ekta Kaul made her debut as the female lead. The show revolves around the love triangle involving the characters played by the three actors with a large part of the story occurring in London. This was the first ever cross continental show in Indian television.

The series aired in Iran under the title به نام الهه عشق from 20 September 2014 to 12 February 2015 on the network Gem Bollywood. The show was dubbed into English as Eternal Love and broadcast on Zee World on DSTv channel 166 and was later also aired on Zee TV UK.

== Plot ==
The series begins with the love triangle of Ranveer, Sahiba and Daljeet. Daljeet is in love with Sahiba, who has feelings for Ranveer. Ranveer flies to London for a job. To meet him, Sahiba needs passport and an easy way is her marriage. She weds Daljeet and reaches London. Upon knowing Sahiba is now married and living in London, Ranveer assumes she has moved on and gets engaged to Jazz. To unite him with Sahiba, Daljeet locates Ranveer who now learns the truth. Sahiba, however, now loves Daljeet.

Enraged after knowing this, Ranveer kills Karamveer and frames Daljeet who is jailed. He asks Sahiba to wed him for Daljeet's freedom. Helplessly she does so, and loses Daljeet's unborn child. Later Ranveer decides to set Sahiba free, unaware that she is now pregnant with his child. Bailed, Daljeet finds the footage of Karamveer's death and then fights with Ranveer, leading an accident in which he dies. His father Karnal blames Daljeet and Sahiba for his death.

=== 6 years later ===
Sahiba now works in a private orphanage, after having split from Daljeet who still loves her. She has lost her memory but keeps having dreams. Fateh Rathod, the orphanage owner's son is Ranveer's lookalike. He and Sahiba fall in love. Daljeet tries to separate them. Sahiba finally remembers her past. Fateh accepts her and Ranveer's 6-year-old son, Jeet. They marry. Heartbroken, Daljeet weds Sukhmeet Kaur.

=== 22 years later ===
Fateh is dead. Sahiba lives with Jeet and her and Fateh's son, Rounak. Jeet is prejudiced against her. Rounak and Jeet fall in love with Daljeet's daughter Heer, who has feelings for Rounak. However, later, Jeet steps aside. In the end, Rounak and Heer marry.

== Cast ==
=== Main ===
- Ashish Sharma as
  - Ranveer Singh - Sahiba's first husband; Jeet's father; Rounak's stepfather (2012) (Dead)
  - Fateh Singh Rathore - Sahiba's second husband; Rounak's father; Jeet's stepfather (2012–2013) (Dead)
  - Jeet Singh Rathore- Sahiba and Ranveer's son; Rounak's stepbrother (2013)
- Ekta Kaul as Sahiba Ranveer Singh / Sahiba Fateh Singh Rathore - Roop's elder sister; Ranveer and Fateh's widow; Jeet and Rounak's mother (2012–2013).
- Kanan Malhotra as Daljeet Singh: Sukhmeet's husband; Heer's father (2012–2013) (Dead)
- Anuj Thakur as Rounak Singh Rathore- Sahiba and Fateh's son; Jeet's half-brother; Heer's husband (2013)
- Mansi Srivastava as Heer Singh / Heer Rounak Singh Rathore- Sukhmeet and Daljeet daughter; Rounak's wife; Sahiba's younger daughter-in-law (2013).

=== Recurring ===
- Riyanka Chanda as Sabby
- Jass Bhatia as Happy
- Sukirti Kandpal as Jasveer "Jazz" Kaur Sodhi (2012)
- Pramod Moutho as Karamveer Singh Sodhi (2012)
- Neha Janpandit as Mallika
- Aryan Vaid as Harry
- Malini Kapoor as Beauty
- Ekroop Bedi as Roop
- Manmeet Singh as Manmeet Singh
- Sanjay Swaraj as Karnal Singh
- Roshaan Khan as News Caster
- Kanwalpreet Singh
- Juel Stokes as Mrs. Smith

== Ratings ==
The show opened to a TRP of 1.8, and continued gaining TRPs in a range of 1.0 - 1.8 in its initial months. Later, the show started gaining average TRPs of 2.0 - 2.6. The show also recorded its highest TRP of 4.7 when it had a crossover with Sapne Suhane Ladakpan Ke. The show soon dropped in TRPs and was ultimately replaced by Jodha Akbar.

== Location ==
Rab Se Sona Ishq is the first Zee TV show to be filmed in a country other than India. The majority of the show was filmed around London.
