= Narayan Rao Pawar =

Indian independence activist

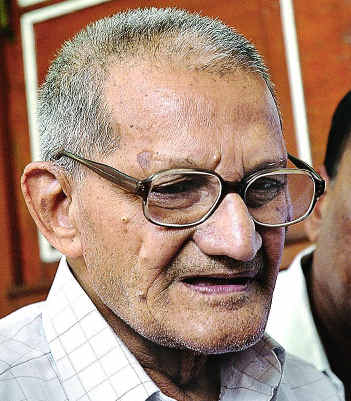

Personal details
- Born: 1925 Andhra Pradesh
- Died: 6 December 2010 (aged 85) Hyderabad
- Spouse: Vijayalaxmi Pawar
- Children: 6 (Vimal Kadam, Nirmala Makne, Prabhakar Pawar, Kiran Goje, Sudhakar Pawar, Madhukar Pawar)

Narayan Rao Pawar (1925 – 6 December 2010) was an Indian independence activist and member of Arya Samaj. He became popular after plotting to kill the last Nizam of Hyderabad, Mir Osman Ali Khan.

== Career ==
Narayan Rao Pawar, along with two others (Jagadish Arya and Gandaiah Arya), threw a bomb at the Last Nizam on 4 December 1947 near King Kothi Palace. The sessions court awarded him the death sentence and a life sentence to Jagadish Arya.

However, on 17 September 1948 his death sentence was commuted to life sentence.

Finally after serving 21 months in jail, he was released on 10 Aug 1949.

He died on 6 December 2010.

He was a follower of Raavi Narayan Reddy, the doyen of the Hyderabad Armed Struggle.
