= Mausam Ikrar Ke Do Pal Pyar Ke =

2018 Indian romantic film by Partho Ghosh

- Theatrical poster
- Directed by: Partho Ghosh
- Produced by: Manju Bharti
- Starring: Mukesh J Bharti; Madalsa Sharma; Manju Bharti; Neelu Kohli; Avinash Wadhawan; Ganesh Acharya; Usha Bachani; Hemant Pandey; Vj Andy; Dipoo Srivatava; Arun Bakshi; Ehsan Khan
- Cinematography: Ganesh Acharya; Jojo Khan; Urvi Seth
- Edited by: Manoj Sanklu
- Music by: Bappi Lahiri
- Production company: Viivek Films Production House
- Release date: 2 November 2018
- Running time: 145 minutes
- Country: India
- Language: Hindi

Mausam Ikrar Ke Do Pal Pyaar Ke is a 2018 Indian romantic drama film directed by Partho Ghosh. It is produced by Manju Bharti, with cast of Mukesh J Bharti, Madalsa Sharma and Avinash Wadhawan in lead roles. Whereas Arun Bakshi, Manju Bharti, Deepu Shrivastav and Neelu Kohli are in supporting roles. The film is based on a love story of Amar and Anjali.

== Synopsis ==
This is a love story between Amar and Anjali. Amar arrives in Moradabad from Paris to pursue his education, while on his way to college he runs into an accident and fractures his hand.

When Anjali learns that he is new in the city and knows no one, she offers him help taking him to her home and introduces him to her mother and father. After conversing they learn that Amar has been admitted to the same college as that of Anjali. They start going to college together and become friends. Anjali eventually falls in love with Amar but Amar has no such feelings.

Raj's friend Dhirendra an ACP tries to convince him for Anjali's wedding with his son. Amar goes back to his house after his hand is healed, Anajali starts missing him and feels an emptiness, and she proposes to him. Amar rejects Anjali's proposal breaking her heart. When her father Raj learns that Anjali loves Amar he feels happy as he liked Amar ever since he met him. Later on Raj meets Amar and convinces him to marry Anjali. He accepts the proposal and tells his mother to fly to Moradabad from Paris for the wedding.

On the day of engagement Raj learns that Amar is the son of an enemy back in college, he immediately cancels the engagement and fixes Anjali's marriage with the Dhirendra's son. On the say of Anjali's mother, Madhu, Amar runs away with Anjali. The police catch Amar and Anjali and imprison him. Anjali is pressured to marry Dhirendra's son. Anjali tells them that she will get married if they release Amar from jail. Police drops Amar home and threatens him and his mother to leave the city at the earliest. Anjali gets ready for the marriage while Amar and his mother head towards the airport. Amar gets off the car and starts running in order to meet Anjali in the meanwhile Madhu tries to convince Raj that he is doing wrong with his daughter. Raj realizes his mistake and unites Anjali and Amar.

== Cast ==
- Mukesh J Bharti as Amar
- Madalsa Sharma as Anjali
- Manju Bharti as Simi
- Neelu Kohli as Mother
- Avinash Wadhawan as Father
- Ganesh Acharya as Guest
- Usha Bachani as Divya
- Hemant Pandey
- Vj Andy as Jassi
- Dipoo Srivastava as Jonny
- Arun Bakshi as Guest
- Ehsan Khan as ACP

== Soundtrack ==
Mausam Ikrar Ke Do Pal Pyaar Ke

Soundtrack album by Bappi Lahiri
- Released: 2 November 2018
- Recorded: 2018
- Genre: Feature Film Soundtrack
- Length: 25:25
- Language: Hindi
- Label: Zee Music Company
External audio
- Audio Jukebox on YouTube

The music of the film was composed by Bappi Lahiri and lyrics by Dr Deepak Sneh.

Tracklisting
| No. | Title | Lyrics | Music | Singer(s) | Length |
|---|---|---|---|---|---|
| 1. | "Party Dam Dama Dam" | Dr Deepak Sneh | Bappi Lahiri | Bappi Lahiri/Palak Muchhal | 4:59 |
| 2. | "Do Pal Pyar Ke" | Dr Deepak Sneh | Bappi Lahiri | Shaan/Palak Muchhal | 6:39 |
| 3. | "Tere Bina" | Dr Deepak Sneh | Bappi Lahiri | Armaan Malik | 5:32 |
| 4. | "Ek Tumba Bole" | Dr Deepak Sneh | Bappi Lahiri | Brijesh shandaliya and Amruta fadnavis | 4:20 |
| 5. | "Allah Allah" | Dr Deepak Sneh | Bappi Lahiri | Babul Supriyo | 5:18 |
| Total length: | | | | | 25:25 |

== Release ==
The film was released on 2 November 2018.

== See also ==
- List of Bollywood films of 2018
