= Neelu Kohli =

Indian actress

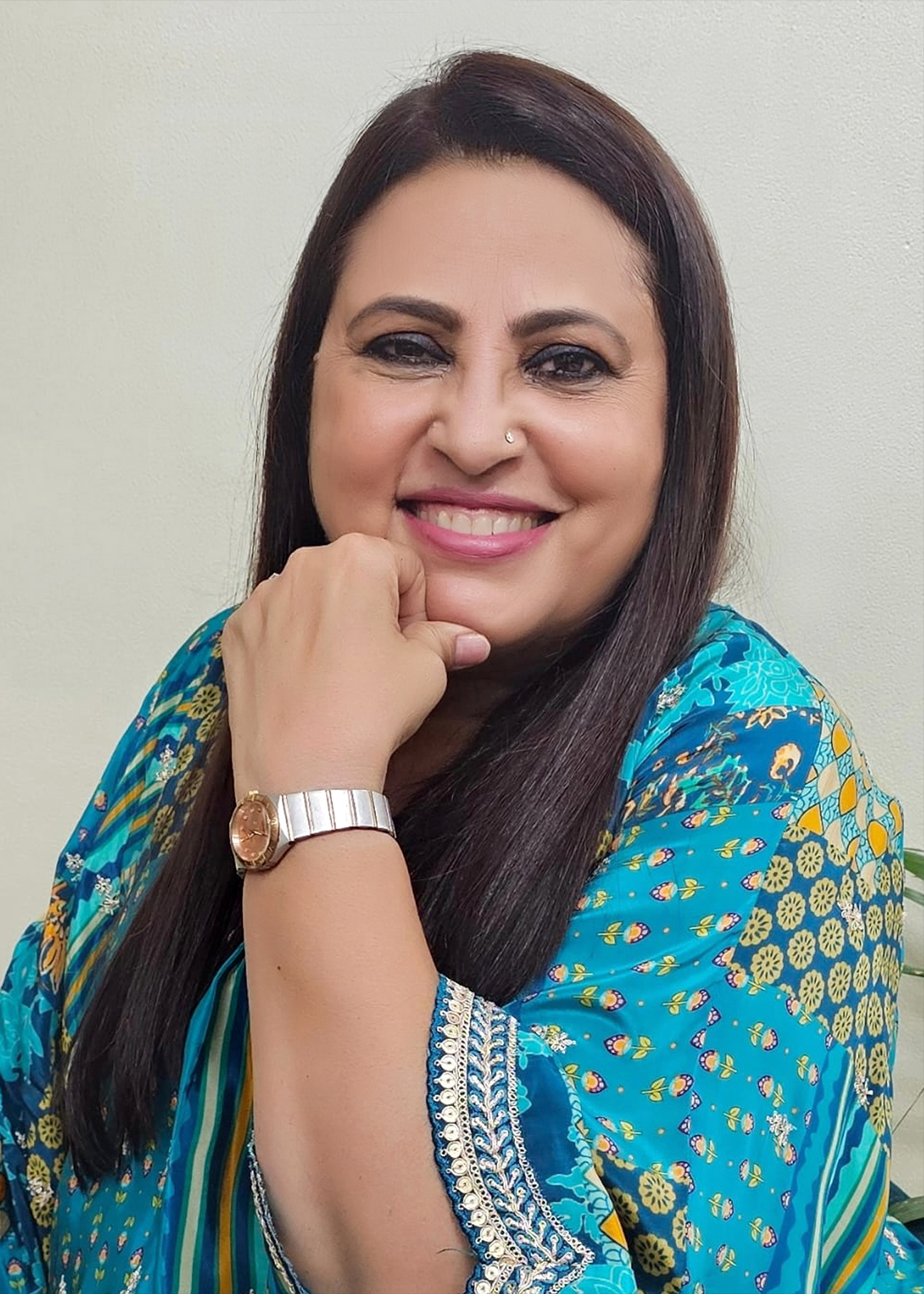
- Kohli in 2025
- Born: Neelu Dugal; Ranchi, Jharkhand, India
- Education: Nirmala College
- Occupation: Actress
- Years active: 1999–present
- Known for: Shastri Sisters
- Spouse: Harminder Singh Kohli (died 2023)
- Children: 1 (Saheeba)
- Mother: Meeta Dugal

Neelu Kohli (also Nilu Kohli) is an Indian film and television actress. She has done many roles in Indian television series, like Sangam, Naamkaran, Mere Angne Mein, Maddam Sir and Choti Sarrdaarni. She has also worked in Hindi films such as Housefull 2, Hindi Medium and Patiala House.

== Early life ==
She was born and brought up in Ranchi. Her mother was Meeta Dugal. She studied at Loreto Convent and Nirmala College.

== Career ==
Neelu Kohli began in the 1990s with shows like Aahat and Bhabhi, and became known for her strong supporting roles in popular shows like Madhubala – Ek Ishq Ek Junoon, Shastri Sisters, and Choti Sarrdaarni.

In films, she has featured in Patiala House (film), Shershaah, Runway 34, Housefull 2, and Fukrey Returns, portraying diverse maternal and character roles with depth. She has played mother to Abhishek Bachchan in Run, Manmarziyan and to Jimmy Sheirgill Agni Pankh. In the OTT space, she was seen in Rashbhari and United Kacche, continuing to evolve with changing times.

== Personal life ==
She was married to Harminder Singh Kohli. Her husband, died on March 24, 2023, due to cardiac arrest. He collapsed in the bathroom and was found by their daughter. Despite efforts, he died before reaching the hospital. Nilu and Harminder were married in 1986, and they had two children: Banveer (Saheb) Singh Kohli, who is married to Tripti Kohli, and Sahiba Kohli Merchant.

== Filmography ==
=== Films ===
Year	Title	Role	Notes	Ref
1999	Dil Kya Kare			
2000	Tapish	Tara's mother		
2001	Tere Liye	Hero's mother		
2001	Style	Hero's mother		
2004	Agnipankh	Hero's mother		
2004	Run	Sidharth's mother		
2007	Khanna & Iyer	Khartara P Khanna		
2007	MP3: Mera Pehla Pehla Pyaar	Paminder Kaur Pammi Singh		
2008	Sat Sri Akal	Simran's Aunt		
2008	Yeh Mera India	Jatin's Mother		
2009	Aiyyo Paaji!	Mrs.Kohli		
2009	Luck by Chance	Mohini Aunty		
2010	Break Ke Baad	Kamal Gulati		
2010	Hum Tum Aur Ghost	Riya		
2011	Jaana Pehchana	Asha's friend		
2011	Patiala House	Harleen Chachi		
2012	Housefull 2	Dolly Kapoor		
2013	Gori Tere Pyaar Mein	Dia Sharma's mother		
2013	Boss	Kamini Zorawar Singh		
2015	Black Home			
2015	Love Exchange	Mrs. Kapoor		
2015	Ishq Ne Krazy Kiya Re			
2017	Hindi Medium	Mita's mother		
2017	Fukrey Returns	Choocha's mother		
2018	Manmarziyaan			
2018	Mausam Ikrar Ke Do Pal Pyar Ke	Mother		
2018	Plus Minus	Mummyji	Short film	
2019	Jhootha Kahin Ka	Sonam's mother		
2019	Kitty Party			
2020	Romeo Idiot Desi Juliet	Mother		
2021	Kya Meri Sonam Gupta Bewafa Hai?	Sonam's mother		
2022	Jogi	Harunder		
2022	Goodbye	Geeta		
2022	Court Kachehri			
2022	Saroj Ka Rishta	Saroj's aunt		
2024	Kakuda	Indira's Mother		
2025	Dhoom Dhaam	Nandini Chadha		

=== Television ===
Year	Title	Role	Notes	Ref
1995	Aahat Season 3	Durga (Episode 13)		
2002	Bhabhi	Nanda Kukku Chabra		
2003	Khushiyaan	Charu		
2007	Sangam	Rano Bua		
2010	Geet - Hui Sabse Parayi	Rupinder Handa		
2010	Kaali – Ek Agnipariksha	Babli		
2011	Love U Zindagi	Parmeet Kaur		
2011	Piya Ka Ghar Pyaara Lage	Rano Mehta		
2012	Madhubala - Ek Ishq Ek Junoon	Harjeet Kapoor		
2012	Na Bole Tum Na Maine Kuch Kaha	Indu Bhatnagar		
2014	Shastri Sisters	Minty Sareen		
2014	Jamai Raja	Anupama Khanna		
2015	Mere Angne Mein	Sharmili Sinha		
2016	Naamkarann	Harleen Khanna		
2019	Choti Sarrdaarni	Vidita Bajwa		
2019	Tera Kya Hoga Alia	Principal Saudamini		
2020	Maddam Sir	Bindu		
2022	Yeh Jhuki Jhuki Si Nazar	Anjali Mathur		
2025	Zyada Mat Udd	Lovely		

=== Web series ===
Year	Title	Role	Notes	Ref
2022	Ghar Set Hai (Season 1 to 6 )	Lakhan's Mother		
