= Roshni Rastogi =

Indian television actress

- Occupation: Actress
- Known for: Mere Angne Mein As Rani

Roshni Rastogi is an Indian television actress who plays various characters in daily Indian soap operas. Rastogi is an alumna of Sahejmoodra Acting Academy, and had her first television roles in the series Iss Pyaar Ko Kya Naam Doon, and Crazy Stupid Ishq. In 2015–17, she was seen playing the joint-lead role of Rani Aggarwal in STAR Plus's TV serial Mere Angne Mein, and was popular for this role. She has also appeared in many stageplays, in her seven years of theatre work.

== Television ==
Year	Show	Role	Notice
2011	Iss Pyaar Ko Kya Naam Doon?	Khushi's Friend	Cameo Appearance
2015–2017	Mere Angne Mein	Rani Amit Agarwal	Parallel Female Protagonist
2018–2019	Siddhi Vinayak	Urvashi Vinayak Kundra	Main Female Antagonist
2023	Suhaagan	Rekha	
