= Ekta Kaul =

Indian television actress (born 1990)

- Born: 16 May 1990 (age 36); Srinagar, Kashmir, India
- Occupations: Actress; model
- Years active: 2012–2017; 2022–present
- Known for: Rab Se Sohna Isshq; Bade Achhe Lagte Hain; Mere Angne Mein; Pathaan
- Spouse: Sumeet Vyas (m. 2018)
- Children: 1

Ekta Kaul (born 16 May 1990) is an Indian actress who mainly works in Hindi television. She is best known for her portrayal of Sahiba Agarwal in Rab Se Sohna Isshq, Dr. Suhani Malhotra in Bade Achhe Lagte Hain and Riya Mathur in Mere Angne Mein. She participated in Jhalak Dikhhla Jaa 6 in 2013.

== Early life ==
Ekta Kaul was born in Srinagar, Kashmir in India. She completed her graduation in biotechnology and later earned an MBA. She was working with Nestle for a while, and whilst she was posted in Mumbai, she dabbled in acting.

== Career ==
Kaul began her career with the leading role of Sahiba in Rab Se Sohna Isshq, She was a contestant in season 6 of dance reality show Jhalak Dikhhla Jaa. She played the role of Dr. Suhani in Bade Achhe Lagte Hain on Sony Entertainment Television India.

In 2015, she won the lead role of Riya Mathur in Star Plus's drama series Mere Angne Mein.

In August 2017, she was confirmed as the new female lead on Life OK show Ghulaam but the show went off air and her entry was eventually scrapped. Ekta has recently played a role in the SonyLIV web series “Tanav”.

== Personal life ==
Kaul dated her Rab Se Sohna Isshq co-star Kanan Malhotra. The couple split in 2013. She married actor Sumeet Vyas on 15 September 2018. They have a son, Ved, born in 2020.

== Filmography ==
=== Films ===
| Year | Title | Role | Notes |
|---|---|---|---|
| 2023 | Pathaan | Shweta Bajaj | |
| 2024 | Main Atal Hoon | Rajkumari Kaul | |

=== Television ===
| Year | Title | Role | Notes |
|---|---|---|---|
| 2012–2013 | Rab Se Sohna Isshq | Sahiba Agarwal/Anusha "Anu" Sahni | |
| 2013 | Jhalak Dikhhla Jaa 6 | Contestant | 13th place |
| 2013–2014 | Bade Achhe Lagte Hain | Dr. Suhani Malhotra | |
| 2014 | Yeh Hai Aashiqui | RJ Yoshika | |
| 2014–2015 | Box Cricket League 1 | Contestant | |
| 2015 | Ek Rishta Aisa Bhi | | |
| 2015–2017 | Mere Angne Mein | Riya Mathur Srivastav | |

=== Web series ===
| Year | Title | Role | Notes |
|---|---|---|---|
| 2022 | Tanaav | Dr. Farah Al Abid | Debut series |

== Awards and nominations ==
| Year | Award | Category | Work | Result | Ref. |
|---|---|---|---|---|---|
| 2013 | Indian Telly Awards | Fresh New Face - Female | Rab Se Sohna Isshq | Nominated | |
| 2013 | Gold Awards | Debut in a Lead Role (Female) | Rab Se Sohna Isshq | Nominated | |
