= Colors TV =

Indian general entertainment television channel

- Logo used until 2024
- Country: India
- Broadcast area: Worldwide except Bangladesh

Programming
- Language: Hindi
- Picture format: 1080p HDTV

Ownership
- Owner: JioStar
- Sister channels: JioStar Channels

History
- Launched: 21 July 2008; 18 years ago

Links
- Website: www.colorstv.com

Availability

Terrestrial
- Disney+ Hotstar: Indonesia, Malaysia, Thailand, Vietnam, Canada, United Kingdom and Singapore

Streaming media
- JioHotstar: India
- YouTube: India

Colors TV is an Indian entertainment pay television channel owned by JioStar (a joint venture between Reliance Industries, Viacom18 and Disney India). Its programming consists of family dramas, fantasy shows, romantic dramas, comedies and reality shows.

== History ==
The channel was launched on 21 July 2008 by Viacom18 under CEO Rajesh Kamat. In April 2011, Raj Nayak was appointed CEO, replacing Rajesh Kamat, who left to join CA Media.

== International ==
On 21 January 2010, Colors became available on Dish Network in the United States, Canada, and Mexico, where it is called Aapka Colors (Your Colors) that gives English subtitles on every show and to avoid confusion with now-defunct Colors TV. Amitabh Bachchan served as brand ambassador for the UK and USA launches.

Colors launched in the United Kingdom and Ireland on Sky on 25 January 2010. On 9 December 2009, INX Media confirmed that Colors had bought 9XM's Sky EPG slot on channel 829 and on 5 January 2010, Colors secured a deal to join the ViewAsia subscription package. Initially the channel was available free-to-air and then subsequently was added to the ViewAsia package on 19 April 2010. Colors was added to Virgin Media on 1 April 2011, as a part of the Asian Mela pack. On 2 September 2013, Colors left the ViewAsia package and became free-to-air on satellite again, as well as moving to Virgin's basic package. On 18 August 2017, this decision was later reversed, and Colors left Freeview and became a pay channel again.

== Golden Petal Awards ==
The Golden Petal Awards was an award ceremony that honoured personalities for their contributions to Colors TV. The ceremony was broadcast on the channel itself. It was last held in 2017.

== Sister channels ==
=== Colors Rishtey ===
Programmes of Pakistan channels have been telecast, such as Humsafar. Rishtey rebroadcasts series from many other channels as well. The channel also creates original productions. Produced by BBC Media Action, Navrangi Re! is the channel's first original programming.

In 2016, Viacom18 (now JioStar), launched a Nickelodeon programming block named "Nick Hour India" on Colors Rishtey India.

On 1 March 2019, the channel was rebranded as Colors Rishtey.
