= Richa Mukherjee =

Indian television actress

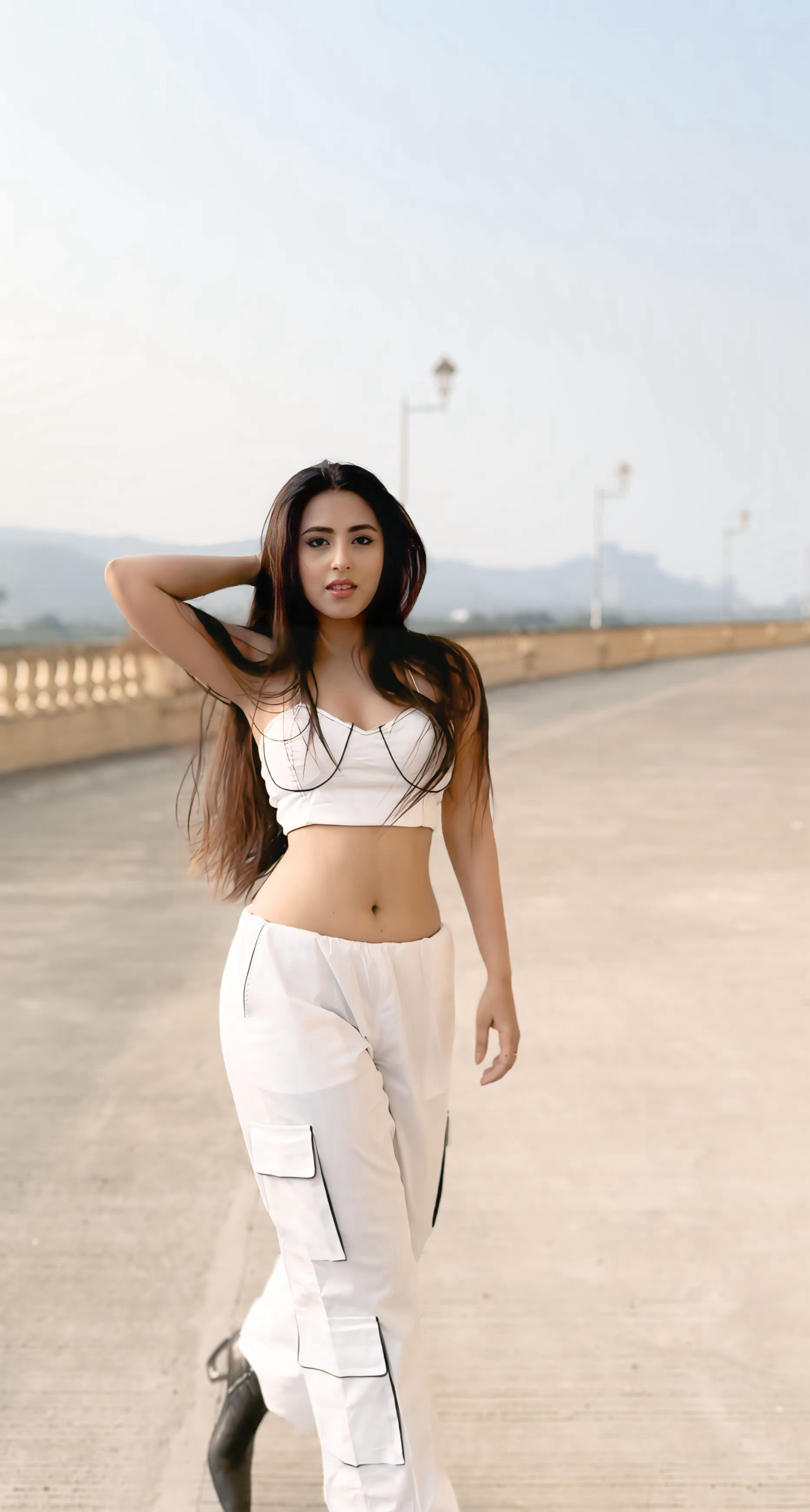
- Born: Richa Mukherjee
- Occupation: Actress
- Years active: 2005–present

Richa Mukherjee is an Indian television actress known for her roles as Uttarā in Mahabharat, Guddi Thakur in Begusarai and Aarati Srivastav in Mere Angne Mein.

== Filmography ==
Key
†	Denotes films that have not yet been released

=== Films ===
Year	Title	Role	Notes	Ref.
2022	Pyar Mein Thoda Twist	Maya		
TBA	Love Hackers †			

=== Television ===
Year	Title	Role	Ref.
2006–2007	Dharti Ka Veer Yodha Prithviraj Chauhan	Vaishali	
2006–2007	Ghar Ki Lakshmi Betiyann	Saraswati	
2007	Man Mein Hai Visshwas	Cameo	
2007	Kasturi	Kasturi	
2008	Kumkum - Ek Pyara Sa Bandhan	Child Kumkum Mishra	
2008	Mata Ki Chowki	Child Vaishnavi	
2008	Ramayan	Young Shrutakirti	
2009–2010	Agle Janam Mohe Bitiya Hi Kijo	Rekha	
2011	Ek Nayi Chhoti Si Zindagi	Isha	
2012	Crime Patrol	Student	
2013	Punar Vivah - Ek Nayi Umeed	Munni	
2014	Mahabharat	Uttara	
2015	Pyaar Tune Kya Kiya	Shivani	
2015–2016	Begusarai	Guddi	
2016	Suryaputra Karn	Lakshmanaa	
2016	Nagarjuna- Ek Yoddha	Urmi	
2017	Mere Angne Mein	Aarati "Charni" Shivam Srivastav	
2018	Kaun Hai?	Maya	
2019	Aghori	Kauravi (Kankali)	
2026	Do Duniya Ek Dil	Monica	
