= Siddhant Cinevision =

Indian production company (founded 1993)

Siddhant Cinevision Private Limited
- Company type: Private Limited Company
- Industry: Television
- Genre: Entertainment
- Founded: 1993
- Founder: Manish Goswami
- Headquarters: Mumbai, India
- Key people: Manish Goswami; Siddhant Goswami
- Services: Television series
- Divisions: Television Productions
- Website: www.scvl.in

Siddhant Cinevision Private Limited is an Indian company which produces TV Serials established by Manish Goswami on 2 June 1993.

== History ==
The company registered as 'Siddhant Cinevision Private Limited' in 1993 in Mumbai, India, with the objective of Producing TV serials to entertain the Indian viewers.

The production house's first TV show was Parampara, a fiction drama series which was telecasted on Zee TV. Later on, it went on to produce several drama series which includes Aashirwad, Chashme Baddoor, Kittie Party, Kaisa Yeh Ishq Hai...Ajab Sa Risk Hai, Aandhi, Kittu Sabb Jaantii Hai, Sarrkkar and Dahleez among others.

== TV serials ==
The following is the list of Television shows produced under Siddhant Cinevision Private Limited. Note: television series in bold are the shows presently on air.

Year	Title	Channel	Episodes	Notes
1993–98	PARAMPARA	ZEE TV	261	Weekly
1994–98	Daraar	ZEE TV	208	Weekly
1996–97	Mr. Mintoo	ZEE TV		
1996–99	ADHIKAAR	ZEE TV	158	
1997–98	KARZ	ZEE TV	92	
1997–98	Jhootha sach	ZEE TV	48	Weekly
1998–99	Chashme Baddoor	ZEE TV	62	
1998–2001	AASHIRWAD	ZEE TV	161	
1999	KAHAN SE KAHAN TAK	ZEE TV	43	
1999	WAARIS	ZEE TV	52	
1999–2000	ABHIMAAN	DD-1	78	
2000	KARTAVYA	ZEE TV	261	
2000–01	Meethi meethi baatien	DD-1	52	Weekly
2000–01	INSAAF	DD-1	52	
2000	MILAN	SONY TV	58	
2000	ALAG ALAG	CHANNEL 9	38	
2000	Tanhaiyaan	B4U	42	Weekly
2000	KHUSHI	B4U	36	Weekly
2000–01	Sukanya	B4U	150	Daily
2001	ANKAHEE	ZEE TV	26	
2002	KUDRAT	DD-1	52	
2002–04	KITTY PARTY	ZEE TV	436	
2003	FORCE 1	SONY TV	3	(WEEKLY 45 MIN.)
2003–04	Aandhi	ZEE TV	76	
2005–07	KITTU SABB JAANTII HAI	Sahara One	232	
2006	Sarrkkar	ZEE TV	208	
2006	AISA DESH HAIN MERA	SONY TV	139	
2007	How's that	DD-1	26	Weekly
2008–09	Meet Mila De Rabba	SONY TV	103	
2009	Dehleez	NDTV Imagine	61	
2009–10	Shraddha	Star Plus	80	
2013–14	KAISA YE ISHQ HAI AJAB SA RISK HAI	Life OK	252	
2016–17	DIL DEKE DEKHO	Sony SAB	169	
