= Raat Hone Ko Hai =

Indian horror television series

- Genre: Horror
- Developed by: B. P. Singh
- Directed by: B. P. Singh; Hemant Prabhu; Rajesh Rana
- Theme music composer: Raju Singh
- Opening theme: "Raat Hone Ko Hai" by Sunidhi Chauhan
- Country of origin: India
- Original language: Hindi
- No. of seasons: 1
- No. of episodes: 309

Production
- Executive producer: Yash Patnaik
- Producers: B. P. Singh; Pradeep Uppoor
- Cinematography: Shabbir Naik
- Editor: Imran Khan
- Camera setup: Multi-camera
- Running time: Approx. 24 minutes
- Production company: Fireworks Productions

Original release
- Network: Sahara Manoranjan
- Release: 10 May 2004 – 21 November 2005

Raat Hone Ko Hai is an Indian television horror series that premiered on Sahara Manoranjan on 10 May 2004.

== Cast ==
Story# 1: House No. 44

- Nivedita Bhattacharya as Ruma (Episode 1 - Episode 4)
- Rajat Kapoor as Anand (Episode 1 - Episode 4)
- Manish Khanna as Dr. Chakramand (Episode 2 & Episode 3)

Story # 2 : Paying Guest

- Hiten Paintal
- Deepa Parab
- Usha Bachani
- Vijay Aidasani
- Shabnam Mishra

Story # 3: Marriage

- Hrishikesh Pandey
- Ritu Chaudhary
- Manini Mishra
- Vishal Watwani
- Naresh Suri

Story # 4: Adhikar

- Akshay Anand as Anil (Episode 13 - Episode 16)
- Mona Ambegaonkar as Malti (Episode 13 - Episode 16)
- Amar Talwar as Anil's Father (Episode 13)
- Aditya Kapadia as Teenager Anuj (Episode 14 & Episode 15)
- Ahmed Khan as Advocate (Episode 15 & Episode 16)
- Romit Raj as Anuj (Episode 15 & Episode 16)

Story # 5: Khandar

- Riva Bubber as Urshila (Episode 17 - Episode 20)
- Deepak Dutta as Mukul (Episode 17 - Episode 20)
- Nigaar Khan as Mona (Episode 17 - Episode 20)
- Ravi Khanvilkar as Evil Spirit (Episode 17 - Episode 20)

Story # 6: Prakop

- Sandeep Rajora as Inspector Solan (Episode 21 - Episode 24)
- Siddharth Choudhary
- Munisha Khatwani

Story # 7: Ateet

- Sumeera Banerjee
- Alyy Khan
- Indu Verma
- Sanjeev Seth

Story # 8: Dark Water

- Rakshanda Khan as Mansi (Episode 29 - Episode 32)
- Mukesh Ahuja as Estate Agent (Episode 29)
- Yash Mittal as Sunny (Episode 29 - Episode 32)
- Poornima Joshi as Himakshi (Episode 30 - Episode 32)
- Jayant Rawal as Sonal's Uncle (Episode 32)
- Arup Pal as Nikhil (Episode 32)

Story # 9: Contest # 86

- Faraaz Khan as Harry (Episode 33 - Episode 36)
- Ahmed Khan as Anna (Episode 33 - Episode 36)
- Mazher Sayed as Santosh (Episode 33 - Episode 34 & Episode 36)
- Nagesh Bhonsle as Vijay (Episode 33 - Episode 36)
- Pawan Malhotra as Mahesh (Episode 33 - Episode 36)
- Raymon Singh as Renu (Episode 33 - Episode 34 & Episode 36)
- Prakash Ramchandani as Atul (Episode 34 & Episode 36)

Story # 10: Theatre

- Yashpal Sharma as Rakesh
- Purbi Joshi as Shreya
- Narendra Jha as Balwidar
- Surekha Sikri
- Kavita Kaushik
- Abhay Bhargava
- Yajuvendra Singh
- Mahendra Mewati
- Denzil Smith
- Dadhi Raj Pandey
- Smita Bhattacharya
- Dhamendra Rana
- Milind Gawali
- Mayur Khan
- Manish Mathur
- Snigdha Akolkar

Story # 11: Poem

- Manek Bedi
- Benika Bisht
- Daya Shankar Pandey
- Bobby Vasta
- Santosh Shah
- Pawan Chopra
- Mubassar Ali
- Saba Mirza

Story # 12: Gumnaam

- Mayuri Kango
- Rajesh Khera
- Prithvi Zutshi
- Prashant Bhatt
- Saurabh Dubey
- Jyoti Joshi
- Sahil Singh
- Sunila Karambelkar

Story # 13: Life Line

- Avinash Wadhawan
- Aditya Srivastav as Pramod (Episode 49 - Episode 52)
- Prateeksha Lonkar
- Kunal Tavri
- Pankaj Karla
- Neha Bam
- Dhananjay Singh
- Himali
- Saheba
- Raj Arjun
- Ananya Chatterjee
- Sachal Tyagi

Story # 14: Drishti

- Shri Vallabh Vyas
- Smita Bansal as Priyanka (Episode 53 - Episode 56)
- Vishal Singh
- Dimple Inamdar
- Ekta Sharma
- Menaka Lalwani
- Ajay Trehan
- Afzaal Khan
- Rambahadur Renu
- Ramesh Goel
- Tabrez Khan

Story # 15: Bargad

- Bijay Anand
- Sonali Khare
- Keerti Gaekwad Kelkar as Naina (Episode 57 - Episode 60)
- Manish Khanna
- Ali Khan
- Kuldeep Sharma
- Harsh Somaya
- Deepa Chaphekar
- Shahid Khan
- Rajesh Dubey
- Samar Jai Singh
- Priyanka Srivastava

Story # 16: Hotel Maya

- Anup Soni
- Sheetal Shah
- Amrapali Gupta
- Madhavi Chopra
- Rajeeta Kochar
- Divya Sharma
- Rajesh Vashisht
- Pravin Brahmabhatt

Story # 17: Maut

- Nawab Shah
- Sonal Pendse
- Shivani Gosain
- Sanjeev Mehra
- Nimai Bali
- Anand Mishra
- Kishan Savjan
- Shanti Bhushan
- Manoj Kainthola
- Kamlesh Trivedi

Story # 18: Connection

- Gufi Paintal
- Neha Mehta
- Rushad Rana
- Poorva Parag
- Naveen Bawa
- Deepraj Rana
- Bhavan Sharma
- Sachal Tyagi
- Ajay Verma
- Raja Kapse
- Mehboob Khan
- Jaydutt Vyas
- Gurinder Makhna

Story # 19: Ichchha

- Lilliput
- Joy Sengupta
- Vipra Rawal
- Bakul Thakkar
- Ashwin Kaushal
- Jaya Mathur
- Vaishali Parmar
- Sumeet Arora
- Manohar Pandit
- Alankar Srivastava
- Ankit Sagar

Story # 20: Painting

- Kruttika Desai
- Adi Irani
- Jyotsna Karyekar
- Bhavna Singh
- Maruti Agarwal
- Mukesh Rawal
- Sharmilee Raj
- Ramesh Rai
- Saba Mirza
- Gopal Singh
- Jayant Rawal

Story # 21: Raaz

- Anant Jog
- Nattasha Singh
- Gargi Patel
- Rahul Verma Rajput
- Sonica Handa
- Sunita Rao
- Nikhil Diwan
- Ashok Sawan
- Vijaya Lakhani

Story # 22: Nishaan

- Sunila Karambelkar as Manthara (Episode 85 - Episode 88)
- Savita Bajaj as Anu (Episode 85)
- Rekha Rao as Rachna (Episode 85 - Episode 87)
- Sushmita Daan as Kanika (Episode 85 - Episode 88)
- Abhay Bhargava as Reshamnath (Episode 85 - Episode 88)
- Aliraza Namdar as Vijay (Episode 85)
- Yajuvendra Singh as Vicky (Episode 85 & Episode 86)
- Seema Pandey as Chitra (Episode 85 - Episode 88)
- Banwarilal Jhol as Servant (Episode 85 & Episode 87)

Story # 23: Makaya

- Avinash Wadhawan
- Anita Kanwal
- Mugdha Godbole
- Shailendra Srivastav
- Girish Jain
- Savi Sidhu
- Anup Patel
- Akbar Khan
- Deepa Chapekar
- Shammu Chibbar
- Dhananjay Singh

Story # 24: Takquilla Mansion

- Bhairavi Raichura as Neelima (Episode 93 - Episode 96)
- Sharad Kelkar as Neel (Episode 93 & Episode 96)
- Kunal Tavri as Jatin (Episode 93 - Episode 94 & Episode 96)
- Sanjay Sharma as Jindal (Episode 93 - Episode 96)
- Anup Puri as Karunesh (Episode 94)
- Dinesh Kaushik as Neelima's Father (Episode 94)
- Smita Oak as Spirit (Episode 94 & Episode 95)
- Zarina Wahab as Asha (Episode 95 & Episode 96)

Story # 25: Kathputli

- Vaishnavi Mahant
- Jiten Lalwani
- Shridhar Watsar
- Ravi Jhankal
- Ashiesh Roy
- Amit Kaushik
- Gopal Singh
- Dr. Anil Saxena
- Jamil
- Avinash Deshpande
- Jagdish Pandey
- Jaydeep Panjwani

Story # 26: Panja

- Mukesh Ahuja as Arun (Episode 101 - Episode 104)
- Murli Sharma as Ranvir (Episode 101 - Episode 104)
- Yashodhan Rana as Inspector (Episode 101 - Episode 104)
- Pankaj Vishnu as Inspector Vijay (Episode 101 - Episode 104)
- Reena Kapoor as Meena (Episode 102 - Episode 104)
- Bobby Khan as Vinod (Episode 102 - Episode 104)

Story # 27: Siski

- Vaquar Shaikh
- Nazneen Patel
- Rammohan Sharma
- Vicky Ahuja
- Priya Arya
- Vivek Mishra
- Tania Kumar
- Herman D'Souza
- Yogendra Kumeria
- Dr. Anil Saxena
- Manish Garg
- Rakesh Sharma

Story # 28: Faansi ke baad

- Firdaus Dadi
- Anupam Bhattacharya
- Dharam Taneja
- Raj Khanna
- Bhavna Singh
- Nikita Anand
- Rajan Kapoor
- Meenakshi Sethi
- Nilesh
- Bharmabhatt
- Ashok Punjabi

Story # 29: Video Game

- Gajendra Chauhan
- Rahul Lohani
- Malini Kapoor
- Jaya Binju
- Ramesh Goyal
- Banwanrilal Jhol
- Anup Shukla
- Ashok Awasthi
- Ajit Mehra
- Raja Kapse
- Kishan Mehta
- Manish Narayan
- Anurag Bali

Story # 30: Aag

- Rohit Bakshi
- Pallavi Dutt
- Vijay Bhatia
- Anupam Shyam
- Vijay Singh
- Jonny Sian
- Mayuresh Dandekar
- Seema Motwani
- Jonny Sian
- Mayuresh Dandekar

Story # 31: Jaanwar

- Dilip Thadeshwar
- Manasvi Vyas
- Shweta Rastogi
- Ali Khan
- Amit Pachori
- Shalini Arora
- Shakil Sayani
- Devendra Kumar

Story # 32: Obit Column

- Nasir Khan
- Keerti Gaekwad Kelkar as Kartika (Episode 125 - Episode 128)
- Jahangir Khan
- Kavit Dutt
- Richa Verma
- Cindrella D. Cruz
- Some Jain
- Manish Kulkarni

Story # 33: Tattoo

- Sanjay Sharma
- Aditya Rajput
- Aliza

Story # 34: 65 Crore ke liye

- Abir Goswami as Aryan (Episode 133 - Episode 136)
- Garima Kapoor
- Kashish Duggal
- Niraj Sood
- Vinod Singh
- Javed Abedi
- Bhavan Singh

Story # 35: Never Say Die

- Amita Chandekar
- Manoj Verma
- Minnie Tiwari
- Amit Kaushik

Story # 36: Kirdaar

- Nasir Khan
- Vishwajeet Pradhan
- Utkarsha Naik
- Poorva Parag
- Bakul Thakkar

Story # 37: Humsaya

- Shruti Ulfat
- Siddharth Dhawan as Rohan (Episode 145 - Episode 148)
- Juhee

Story # 38: Qaid

- Sucheta Khanna
- Aashish Kaul as Deven (Episode 149 - Episode 152)
- Sunila Karambelkar
- Sonal Bhogal

Story # 39: Cheating

- Faraaz Khan
- Madhavi Chopra
- Choyonica Ghosh
- Chirag Channa

Story # 40: Camera

- Sahil Chaddha
- Pragati Mehra
- Shruti Sharma

Story # 41: Shikar

- Ahmed Khan as Raja Saab (Episode 161 & Episode 162)
- Sanjay Sharma as J.J. (Episode 161 - Episode 164)
- Arup Pal as Shamsher Singh (Episode 161 - Episode 164)
- Rambahadur Renu as Sunka (Episode 161 - Episode 164)
- Rajesh Tandon as Vikram (Episode 161 - Episode 164)
- Vineet Kumar as Benua (Episode 161)
- Ritu Chaudhary as Inspector Kajal (Episode 162 - Episode 164)

Story # 42: Nishachar

- Amit Behl
- Chetanya Adib
- Sudeepa Singh
- Himmanshoo A. Malhotra

Story # 43: Nightmare

- Manasi Varma
- Gautam Chaturvedi
- Kajal Sharma
- Priya Valecha
- Shantanu

Story # 44: Back to the city

- Jiten Lalwani
- Amit Behl
- Vicky Ahuja
- Ashwin Kaushal

Story # 45: Shaadi

- Manav Kaul as Siddharth Pratap Singh (Episode 177 - Episode 180)
- Jahangir Khan as Rudra Pratap Singh (Episode 177 - Episode 180)
- Simple Kaul as Sonia (Episode 177 - Episode 180)
- Chitrapama Banerjee as Monica (Episode 178 - Episode 180)

Story # 46: Budhiya

- Pankaj Vishnu as Gagan (Episode 181 - Episode 184)
- Arya Rawal as Meena (Episode 181 - Episode 182 & Episode 184)
- Rahul Lohani as Rajan (Episode 181 - Episode 184)
- Samar Jai Singh as Prem (Episode 181 & Episode 184)
- Utkarsha Naik as Gagan's Mother (Episode 181 - Episode 184)
- Murli Sharma as Professor Narendra (Episode 183 & Episode 184)

Story # 47: Tingoo

- Sweta Keswani as Monica (Episode 185 - Episode 188)
- Manish Raisinghan
- Zahir Khan
- Kuldeep Dubey
- Suhasi Goradia Dhami

Story # 48: You are not alone

- Sherrin Varghese
- Neetha Shetty
- Aniket Jagtap
- Karuna Pandey

Story # 49: Man Eater Wall

- Karishma Tanna as Dhara (Episode 193 - Episode 196)
- Raj Khanna
- Tarun Mehta
- Manju Vyas
- Payal Shrivastava
- Kannan
- Mukesh Dasmana
- Arushi
- Dibyendu Bhattacharya
- Hitendra Chouhan
- Juhee
- Rommie Siddiquee

Story # 50: Sikka

- Abhimanyu Singh
- Jaya Mathur
- Deepak Dutta
- Vivek Mishra

Story # 51: Baawarchi

- Kabir Sadanand
- Zarina Wahab
- Anant Jog
- Siddharth Dhawan as Anil (Episode 201 - Episode 204)
- Chetanya Adib

Story # 52: Death Dealer

- Shilpa Shinde as Avantika (Episode 205 - Episode 208)
- Suhasi Goradia Dhami
- Govind Khatri
- Saurabh Dubey

Story # 53: Shareer

- Manish Khanna as Grover (Episode 209 - Episode 212)
- Rajiv Kumar as Roger (Episode 209 & Episode 210)
- Zeb Khan as Basky (Episode 209 & Episode 210)
- Yajuvendra Singh as Krish (Episode 209 - Episode 212)
- Faraaz Khan as Roy (Episode 209 - Episode 212)
- Vicky Ahuja as Inspector (Episode 210 - Episode 212)
- Gopal Singh as Inspector (Episode 210 - Episode 212)
- Pradeep Kabra as Watchman (Episode 211)

Story # 54: Lift

- Bhairavi Raichura
- Rajesh Kumar
- Abhay Bhargava
- Mehul Kajaria

Story # 55: Fortune Cookies

- Simple Kaul as Mohini (Episode 217 - Episode 220)
- Sherrin Varghese as Parag (Episode 217 - Episode 220)

Story # 56: Coffee Shop

- Neetha Shetty
- Usha Bachani
- Rahul Lohani
- Soni Singh

Story # 57: Signal

- Puneet Vashist as Vaibhav (Episode 225 - Episode 228)
- Gulrez Khan
- Dibyendu Bhattacharya

Story # 58: Mariya

- Geetanjali Tikekar as Sanjana (Episode 229 - Episode 232)
- Rajeev Paul
- Dalljiet Kaur

Story # 59: Night Shift

- Mazher Sayed as Gyaneshwar (Episode 233 - Episode 236)
- Parul Yadav as Rashmi (Episode 233 - Episode 236)
- Yusuf Hussain as Premjeet (Episode 233 - Episode 236)
- Tasneem Sheikh as Monica (Episode 233 - Episode 236)
- Kuldeep Dubey as Shailen (Episode 234 & Episode 235)
- Adi Irani as Suraj (Episode 234 - Episode 236)

Story # 60: Black Way

- Ujjwal Chopra as Dipankar (Episode 237 - Episode 240)
- Dimple Inamdar as Snigdha (Episode 237 - Episode 240)
- Vaquar Shaikh as Kutty (Episode 237 - Episode 240)
- Yajuvendra Singh as Asit Khambata (Episode 237 - Episode 240)

Story # 61: The Rain of Death

- Kumar Hegde as Satish Kapoor (Episode 241, Episode 243 & Episode 244)
- Saurabh Dubey as Balwant (Episode 241 - Episode 244)
- Hrishikesh Pandey as Bobby Kapoor (Episode 241 - Episode 244)
- Rupali Ganguly as Sonali (Episode 241 - Episode 244)

Story # 62: Phone

- Nasirr Khan
- Rushali Arora
- Rinku Ghosh
- Sudarshana Bhatnagar

Story # 63: Electric Man

- Sonia Kapoor
- Gufi Paintal
- Nagesh Bhonsle
- Jahangir Khan

Story # 64: Vacuum Cleaner

- Rushad Rana
- Muskaan Mihani
- Vicky Ahuja

Story # 65: Kaanch

- Amita Chandekar
- Sanjeet Bedi as Rahul (Episode 257 - Episode 260)
- Mrinal Deshraj
- Ahmad Harhash as Rajat Mehra Singh (Episode 18)

Story # 66: Possession

- Sujata Choudhary
- Chitrapama Banerjee
- Mazher Sayed
- Dinesh Kaushik

Story # 67: Khopdi

- Firdaus Dadi
- Aashish Kaul as Vicky (Episode 265 - Episode 268)
- Tanushree Kaushal
- Khushi Dubey

Story # 68: Scarecrow

- Prithvi
- Kavita Rathod
- Faisal Raza Khan
