= Manish R Goswami =

Indian television producer, film producer and director

Manish Goswami
- Born: 8 October 1964 (age 62); Mumbai, India
- Other name: Chintu
- Citizenship: Indian
- Education: Mumbai University
- Occupations: Television producer, cmd
- Years active: 1993–present
- Spouse: Anuradha Goswami
- Children: Siddhant Goswami
- Relatives: Manoj Kumar (brother)
- Website: www.scvl.in

Manish R Goswami (born 8 October 1964) is an Indian television producer and chairman and managing director (CMD) of Siddhant Cinevision Private Limited. He is the founder of Siddhant Cinevision Limited and did debut as television producer with the Hindi Serial Parampara in 1993, which was telecasted on Zee TV and a popular serial among the viewers. Later he produced more than 35 TV serials like Aashirwad, Daraar, Kittie Party, Milan, Sarrkkar, Kaisa Yeh Ishq Hai...Ajab Sa Risk Hai etc. Those serials were telecasted on different Hindi entertainment TV Channels like DD-1, Zee TV, Star Plus, NDTV Imagine, Sony TV, Life Ok, Sahara One etc.

== Personal life ==
Manish R Goswami is the son of R. N. Goswami and Vimla R. Goswami. He is first cousin of versatile and legendary actor, producer and director of Bollywood Manoj Kumar. He graduated from Mumbai University and married Anuradha Goswami on 19 January 1987. He founded his production house Siddhant Cinevision Private Limited in 1993 and started his production journey with hit TV serial Parampara. Actress Neena Gupta recently released her autobiography 'Sach Kahu To' and narrated her television acting journey by mentioning producer Manish Goswami in that book. Responding to which Manish Goswami said, "Parampara was my first show as a producer on Zee and his first show on Satellite TV. It ran from 1993 to 1998. Whenever he needed advice on production-related activities, I used to guide him. She is a child at heart, passionate and hardworking."

== Career ==
Goswami's father produced the film Upkar released in 1967 and his brother Manoj Kumar is an actor, producer, and director. After Graduation (B.Com.) from Mumbai University, Goswami joined his brother Manoj's film company and worked as a Production Controller from 1987 to 1989. In 1990 he opened his own High Band Editing Studio & A Communication Center from 1990 to 1993, then he opened his own production company and produced his first show Parampara. Under his production house he has produced many TV serials, two Tele films and few TV Serials are in pre-production stage. Manish Goswami has registered the title of Hrishikesh Mukherjee's classic cult comedy film Chupke Chupke (1975) long ago, later while Bhushan's company approached him he gave away the title with 'No Objection' letter as Bhushan Kumar and Luv Ranjan has already decided to remake the 1975 original. Further in 2019 he also gave the title to Ekta Kapoor for her comedy movie Dream Girl. In September 2026, Goswami acquired the screen adaptation rights to Bimal Mitra's memoir 'Bichde Sabhi Baari Baari' and novel 'Sahib Bibi Aur Ghulam' to develop a web series on the life and legacy of filmmaker Guru Dutt.

== Social activity ==
Goswami has started a Preschool & Daycare center with his son Siddhant Goswami, on occasion of inauguration the cricketer Mr. Sunil Gavaskar and Film director Subhash Ghai was presented. Former Indian batsman Sunil Gavaskar and producer Manish Goswami have been close friends for more than two decades. Producer Manish Goswami is trying to convince her to face the camera in one of his upcoming productions. Manish Goswami (Vice President) will hand over 5,000 Covishield vaccines to FWICE (Federation of Western India Cine Employees). FWICE may vaccinate its members who may also ask their spouses to take the dose. 35 million will be transferred among 7,000 salaried employees in trouble due to COVID-19 through a private organization, for which FWICE thanked Manish Goswami for his cooperation. Manish Goswami shares memories related to Dilip Kumar on his death. Manish Goswami learned about Shagufta Ali health and financial plight and helped him financially for his better condition so that he could live well.

Manish Goswami was unanimously elected as the vice-chairman of The Producers Guild of India Limited for the 10th consecutive time in the first meeting of the Management Council held immediately after the 68th Annual General Meeting on 21 September 2022. In September 2026, he was re-elected as the Vice President of the Producers Guild of India for the 12th consecutive time.

== Television ==
The following is the list of Television shows produced by Manish R Goswami under his banner Siddhant Cinevision Private Limited. Note: television series in bold are the shows presently on air.

Year	Title	Channel	Episodes	Notes
1993–98	PARAMPARA	ZEE TV	261	Weekly
1994–98	Daraar	ZEE TV	208	Weekly
1996–97	Mr. Mintoo	ZEE TV		
1996–99	ADHIKAAR	ZEE TV	158	
1997–98	KARZ	ZEE TV	92	
1997–98	Jhootha sach	ZEE TV	48	Weekly
1998–99	Chashme Baddoor	ZEE TV	62	
1998–2001	AASHIRWAD	ZEE TV	161	
1999	KAHAN SE KAHAN TAK	ZEE TV	43	
1999	WAARIS	ZEE TV	52	
1999–2000	ABHIMAAN	DD-1	78	
2000	KARTAVYA	ZEE TV	261	
2000–01	Meethi meethi baatien	DD-1	52	Weekly
2000–01	INSAAF	DD-1	52	
2000	MILAN	Sony TV	58	
2000	ALAG ALAG	CHANNEL 9	38	
2000	Tanhaiyaan	B4U	42	Weekly
2000	KHUSHI	B4U	36	Weekly
2000–01	Sukanya	B4U	150	Daily
2001	ANKAHEE	ZEE TV	26	
2002	KUDRAT	DD-1	52	
2002–04	KITTY PARTY	ZEE TV	436	
2003	FORCE 1	Sony TV	3	(WEEKLY 45 MIN.)
2003–04	Aandhi	ZEE TV	76	
2005–07	KITTU SABB JAANTII HAI	Sahara One	232	
2006	Sarrkkar	ZEE TV	208	
2006	AISA DESH HAIN MERA	Sony TV	139	
2007	How's that	DD-1	26	Weekly
2008–09	Meet Mila De Rabba	Sony TV	103	
2009	Dehleez	NDTV Imagine	61	
2009–10	Shraddha	Star Plus	80	
2013–14	KAISA YE ISHQ HAI AJAB SA RISK HAI	Life OK	252	
2016–17	DIL DEKE DEKHO	Sony SAB	169	
