= Aashirwad =

Aashirwad (blessing in Hindi) may refer to:

- Aashirwad (film), a 1968 Bollywood film
- Aashirwad (TV series), a Hindi television series
