= Aisa Des Hai Mera =

Aisa Des Hai Mera may refer to:

- Aisa Des Hai Mera (TV series), a 2006 Indian television drama series
- Aisa Des Hai Mera (song), a song from the film Veer-Zaara
