= Shabana Raza =

Indian former actress (born 1975)

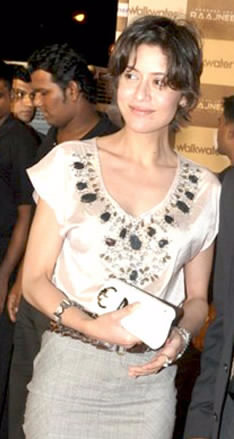
- Raza in 2010
- Born: 18 April 1975 (age 51)
- Other name: Neha
- Occupation: Actress
- Years active: 1998–2009
- Spouse: Manoj Bajpayee (m. 2006)
- Children: 1

Shabana Raza (born April 18, 1975), known professionally as Neha, is an Indian former actress and film producer known for her work in Hindi films. She made her acting debut with Kareeb (1998). Neha is best known for Hogi Pyaar Ki Jeet (1999), Fiza (2000), Rahul (2001), Aatma (2006) and Acid Factory (2009). She is married to actor Manoj Bajpayee since 2006.

== Career ==
Shabana Raza made her film debut opposite Bobby Deol in Kareeb (1998). Her next release was Hogi Pyaar Ki Jeet (1999), where she played the leading lady opposite Ajay Devgn. She went on to act in several more films, including Fiza (2000) where she played Hrithik Roshan's love interest, Rahul (2001) and Aatma. After a break, she returned to acting in 2010 under her original name.

== Personal life ==
Shabana Raza was born on 18 April 1975. She met actor Manoj Bajpayee, after the release of her film, Kareeb, and they began a relationship. The couple got married in April 2006. They have a daughter named Ava Nayla Bajpayee who was born in 2011.

== Filmography ==
Year	Title	Role	Notes	Ref.
1998	Kareeb	Neha		
1999	Hogi Pyaar Ki Jeet	Meena Singh		
2000	Fiza	Shehnaz Sulaiman		
2001	Ehsaas: The Feeling	Antara Pandit		
2001	Rahul	Mira Singh Sharma		
2001	Alli Thandha Vaanam	Meenakshi "Meena"	Tamil film	
2003	Smile		Kannada film	
2004	Muskaan	Jahnvi		
2005	Koi Mere Dil Mein Hai	Asha Thakur		
2006	Aatma	Neha A. Mehra		
2009	Acid Factory	Nandini S. Sanghvi		
