= Smile (2003 film) =

2003 Kannada film starring Shivarajkumar

- DVD cover
- Directed by: Seetharam Karanth
- Written by: Seetharam Karanth; S. Kumar (dialogues)
- Produced by: N. K. Prakash Babu
- Starring: Shiva Rajkumar; Neha
- Cinematography: P. Rajan
- Edited by: T. Goverdhan
- Music by: V. Manohar
- Production company: Sri Matha Pictures
- Release date: 25 July 2003
- Running time: 2 hours 39 minutes
- Country: India
- Language: Kannada

Smile is a 2003 Indian Kannada-language romantic comedy film directed by Seetharam Karanth and starring Shiva Rajkumar and Neha. The music was composed by V. Manohar.

== Cast ==
- Shiva Rajkumar
- Neha
- M. P. Shankar
- Lokanath
- M. S. Umesh
- Ravishankar
- M. S. Karanth
- Shankar Bhat
- M. N. Suresh
- Venkatesh Prasad
- Suresh R. Anchan
- Ramanand
- Vaijanath Biradar
- Nagesh Mayya
- Harish Raay
- Dinesh Mangalore
- M. D. Kaushik
- Shilpa
- Kishori Ballal

== Production ==
The film began production in early 2002. At the film's launch, Shiva Rajkumar said that it is a "different" film. Shilpa worked on this film alongside Ninagagi (2002) and Dumbee (2003); however, both those films ended up releasing before this film.

== Soundtrack ==
Smile

Soundtrack album by V. Manohar
- Released: 25 May 2003
- Genre: Feature film soundtrack
- Length: 40:17
- Label: Anand Audio

External audio
- Official Audio Jukebox on YouTube

The songs were composed and had its lyrics penned by V. Manohar. The music rights was bagged by Anand Audio.

No.	Title	Singer(s)	Length
1.	"Sundari Sundari"	Badri, Nagachandrika, Mangala
2.	"Osama Osama"	Shiva Rajkumar
3.	"Hey Kan Kan Camera"	K. S. Chitra
4.	"Din Din Thara"	Badri
5.	"Kamala Mukha"	S. P. Balasubrahmanyam, Nagachandrika
6.	"Chile Chilepele"	S. P. Balasubrahmanyam, Chitra
7.	"Jagavidi Jagamaga"	S. P. Balasubrahmanyam, Nanditha
8.	"Kaarirulige"	K. S. Chitra

== Release ==
After the success of Thavarige Baa Thangi, producer N. K. Prakash expressed interest in releasing this film. The film was initially supposed to release on 11 July 2003, but was postponed to 28 July 2003 along with Vikram (2003).

== Reception ==
A critic from indiainfo.com wrote that "I feel that you have cheated the audiences. You may be wondering why this accusation in the very first sentence. But what am I to do when I feel so very let down. My disappointment is because of your [Seetharam Karanth's] film SMILE".
