= Shanti (TV series) =

- Genre: Serial drama
- Directed by: Adi Pocha
- Starring: See below
- Country of origin: India
- Original language: Hindi
- No. of seasons: 1
- No. of episodes: 780

Production
- Camera setup: Multi-camera
- Running time: Approx. 24 minutes
- Production company: UTV Software Communications

Original release
- Network: DD National
- Release: 1994

Shanti - Ek Ghar Ki Kahani (transl. Peace - Story of a Home) is an Indian television series that aired on DD National in 1994. The series stars Mandira Bedi as Shanti.

== Plot ==
Every character has a past and has something hidden, it all gets revealed when Shanti, an aspiring journalist hoping to write the biographies of Kamesh and Raj, arrives. The duo only approve of a movie when it is appreciated by the servants of the house and tell of how they went from rags to riches.

Then are shown the family members, Kamesh's eldest son Ramesh is mentally challenged. Younger son Somesh is a failing director struggling over the script which gets rejected even by his own father. His vengeful wife Ayesha is the daughter of a film producer whose career was ruined by the duo. His adopted daughter Nidhi was revealed to be the illegitimate daughter of Kamesh. Raj's wife took to Ashrams and Sadhus, while his youngest son Nihal returns with an American woman Michelle, who accidentally revealed that she is his wife. His elder daughter Maya is drawn to depression by her mother's absence, while his womanizer elder son Rohan is forced to marry a model Sasha after she threatens to come out to the press.

All this is witnessed by Shanti who too has a dark past because one of them is her biological father. Shanti's mother was a laborer working during the construction of Shanti Mansion who was raped by both Kamesh and Raj.

== Cast ==
- Mandira Bedi as Shanti
- Mohini Sharma as Tulsi
- Rajesh Tailang as Manu
- Amit Behl as Vijay
- Anup Soni as Shekhar
- Yatin Karyekar as Kamesh Mahadevan
- Jyotsna Karyekar as Maa
- Vijay Aidasani as Somesh Mahadevan
- Sumukhi Pendse/Joan David as Ayesha Mahadevan
- Iravati Harshe as Nidhi Mahadevan
- Richa Ahuja as Nidhi Mahadevan
- Aman Verma as Sanjay
- Amar Talwar as Raj 'G.J.' Singh
- Anita Kanwal as Indu Singh
- Sanjeev Kapadia as Nihaal
- Sukanya Kulkarni as Maya
- Salim Fatehi Rohan Singh
- Jitu Shastri as Ramesh Mahadevan
- Amikev Singh as Sasha
- Ashwini Kalsekar as Sasha
- Sunil Shende as Bhandari/Bhai
- Rajesh Jais as Nanu
- Nissar khan as Munna
