= Sandeep Rajora =

Indian television actor

- Born: Sandeep Rajora; Delhi, India
- Occupations: Actor; model
- Years active: 2001–present
- Height: 6 ft 4 in (1.93 m)
- Spouse: Roshi Rana (m. 2008)
- Children: 1
- Parent: CPS Rajora (father)
- Relatives: Kavita Rajora (sister)

Sandeep Rajora is an Indian model and television actor. He appeared as a model in the song "Raat Din Tere Khayal Aane Lage".

== Career ==
Rajora started modelling in 2001, after participating in the Gladrags Manhunt Contest in 2001, after which he returned to Mumbai to pursue a career as a model. He modeled for Signature Whiskey and then for a wide range of brands. Rajora has appeared in a number of television serials including Balaji Telefilms's Kkusum as Siddharth Kanwar. He was the winner of AXN's Fear Factor India, shown on Sony Entertainment Television.He also played the role of Kulbhushan Bhalla, Samar's father, in Balaji Telefilms daily fiction show Dil Hi Toh Hai on Sony Entertainment Television. He is also a state-level squash player.

== Education ==
Rajora attended the Army Public School. He holds an MBA from University of Pune and worked with Times Bank in Goa for a brief period before moving to Cimatron in Pune.

== Personal life ==
Rajora married Roshi Rana in Delhi on 9 November 2008. They have a son whose name is Ivaan Rajora.

== Works ==
=== Television ===
Year	Serial	Role	Channel
2002	Ssshhhh...Koi Hai – Jaanwar	Rajesh (Episode 49)	Star Plus
2002–2003	Kkusum	Siddharth Kanwar	Sony Entertainment Television
2003	Kahaani Ghar Ghar Kii	Neeraj Agarwal	Star Plus
2003	Kya Hadsaa Kya Haqeeqat – Khaall: Part 1 to Part 8	Ali (Episode 160 to Episode 167)	Sony Entertainment Television
2004	Vikraal Aur Gabraal – Jaanwar	Rajesh (Episode 35)	Star Plus
2004	Raat Hone Ko Hai – Prakop: Part 1 to Part 4	Inspector Solan (Episode 21 to Episode 24)	Sahara One
2004–2005	Kareena Kareena	Tushar Pandey	Zee TV
2004–2005	Hey...Yehii To Haii Woh!	Pran Thapar	Star One
2005–2006	Sarrkkar – Risshton Ki Ankahi Kahani	Sudhanshu	Zee TV
2006	Sati...Satya Ki Shakti	Advocate Siddharth Raichand	Sahara One
2007	Kyunki Saas Bhi Kabhi Bahu Thi	Inspector Aryan	Star Plus
2008	Jhoome Jiiya Re	Rohan	Zee TV
2008	Kya Dill Mein Hai	Siddharth Punj	9X
2008	Khatam Hone Se Pehle	Vikram	DD National
2009	Love Ne Mila Di Jodi	Inder	Star One
2010	Sssshhh...Phir Koi Hai – Tritya	Sarthak	Star One
2010	Baat Hamari Pakki Hai	Saurabh Jaiswal	Sony Entertainment Television
2012	Dil Se Di Dua... Saubhagyavati Bhava?	Devendra "Dev" Singh	Life OK
2013	Dil Ki Nazar Se Khoobsurat	Lalit Maansingh	Sony Entertainment Television
2013	Mahabharat	Suryadev	Star Plus
2014	Savdhaan India	Ajay Jaiswal / Shashank Jaiswal (Episode 670)	Life OK
2014	MTV Webbed	(Episode 18)	MTV
2014–2015	Ajeeb Dastaan Hai Yeh	Tarun Khanna	Life OK
2015	Suryaputra Karn	Suryadev	Sony Entertainment Television
2015–2016	Sankatmochan Mahabali Hanuman	Suryadev	Sony Entertainment Television
2017	Chandrakanta	Maharaj Jay Singh	Colors TV
2017	Savdhaan India	Teacher (Episode 2308)	Star Bharat
2017–2019	Yeh Un Dinon Ki Baat Hai	Vivek Somani	Sony Entertainment Television
2018	Dil Hi Toh Hai	Kulbhushan Bhalla	Sony Entertainment Television
2020	Santoshi Maa – Sunayein Vrat Kathayein	Maharaj Himavat	&TV
2022	Kabhi Kabhie Ittefaq Sey	Dr. Riddhesh Bhatnagar	Star Plus
2022–2023	Rabb Se Hai Dua	Rahat Akhtar	Zee TV
2023–present	Yeh Rishta Kya Kehlata Hai	Senior Inspector Madhav Poddar	Star Plus

=== Reality Shows ===
Year	Show	Role	Channel
2006	Fear Factor India	Contestant	Sony Entertainment Television

=== Discography ===
Year	Song	Album	Singer
2001	Raat Din Tere Khayal	Bekhudi	Anuradha Paudwal
