= Jubilee Talkies =

2024 Indian Hindi television series

- Directed by: Deepak Chavan
- Starring: Khushi Dubey and Abhishek Bajaj
- Country of origin: India
- Original language: Hindi
- No. of seasons: 1

Production
- Producers: Saurabh Tewari; Parin Multimedia
- Production company: Parin Multimedia

Original release
- Network: Sony Entertainment Television
- Release: June 24 – September 27, 2024

Jubilee Talkies – Shohrat Shiddat Mohabbat is an Indian Hindi romantic drama television series which premiered on 24 June 2024 on Sony Entertainment Television. The show stars Khushi Dubey and Abhishek Bajaj.

== Plot ==
Shivangi Sawant is a humble girl from a small town in Maharashtra, who cherishes a deep love for cinema. She aspires to revive her father’s single-screen theatre, Sangam Cinema, which has declined over time.

Her belief is that a superhit film starring the superstar Ayaan Grover may help restore the glory of cinema. Their paths cross in Mumbai, setting off a romance set against the challenges of fame, ambition, and preservation of traditional cinemas.

== Cast ==
- Khushi Dubey as Shivangi Sawant
- Abhishek Bajaj as Ayaan Groverl
- Sanjay Narvekar
- Asawari Joshi
