= Amit Behl =

Indian television, film & theatre actor

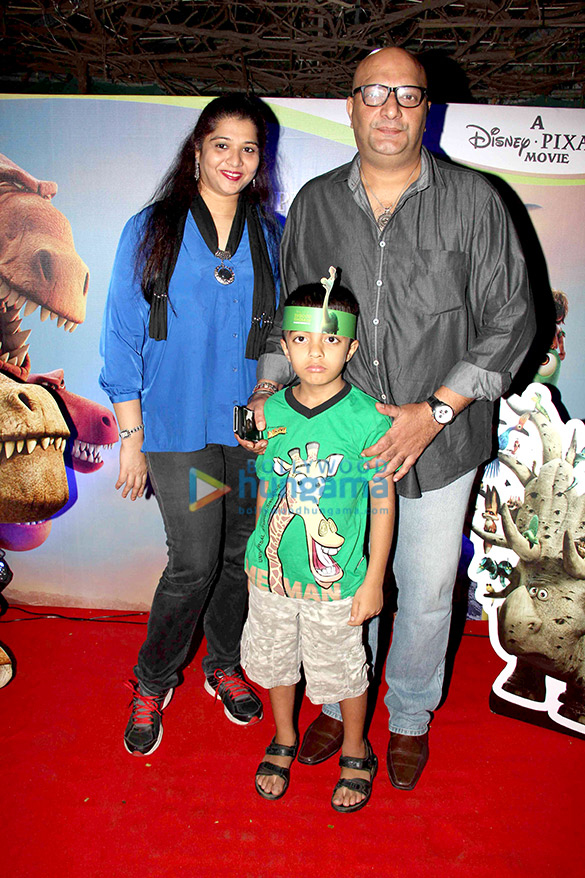
- Behl and family at the screening of Disney's The Good Dinosaur
- Born: Amit Behl
- Occupation: Actor
- Children: 1

Amit Behl is an Indian theatre, television, and film actor. Behl began his career in 1994 with a role in India's first daily soap opera Shanti. He later did TV serials in Hindi, English, Marathi, Punjabi, and Urdu. He has played roles in the Zee Marathi serial Swarajyarakshak Sambhaji, Zee TV's serial Buddha, and the Life OK series Savitri - Ek Prem Kahani.

He is seen in Channel V India's thriller series Friends Conditions Apply. He has worked in serials like Chakravartin Ashoka Samrat and Pradhanmantri. also seen in Balaji Telefilms fiction daily soap opera Kasam Tere Pyaar Ki on Colors TV. He played the role of Ranjeetpratap Singh in Colors TV's serial Ishq Mein Marjawan.

== Early life ==
Behl started acting in college theatre, this was followed by a brief stint in professional theatre in Bombay and New Delhi, after which he joined Shri Ebrahim Alkazi's Living Theatre Academy of Drama. While at the Academy, Behl studied acting. He has degrees in engineering and management.

== Career ==
Amit has been featured in TV shows that have been broadcast on a variety of channels, including Doordarshan, Sony Entertainment Television, Zee TV, Zee Marathi EL TV, NEPC TV, DDMetro, Star Plus, Star One, Life Ok, Colors, Real channel, Hungamma TV, UTV Bindass, Channel V India, MTV, Viacom 18, Business India TV, Geo Pakistan, ARY Digital, Zee next, UTN, ETV Hindi and Urdu, 9x, channel 9 Gold, Mahuaa, PTC, Lashkaara, Gurjari, Life OK, BBC, and ITV worldwide.

Behl has acted in over 50 feature films in Hindi, Gujarati, and Telugu & English. He has also anchored over 100 corporate films and documentaries, acted in advertising films, and served as a voice actor in advertisements and foreign language dubbing. Over the last 30 years, Behl has worked in performing arts, radio, theatre, television and film.

== Filmography ==
=== Films ===
Year	Film	Role	Notes
2001	Kyo Kii... Main Jhuth Nahin Bolta	Doctor	
2003	Hawa	Vijay, Sanjana's husband	
2003	LOC: Kargil	Maj. Ajay Singh Jasrotia	
2004	Kismat	Dr Ajay Saxena, Sapna's Fiance	
2004	Lakshya	Major Subhash Pant	
2006	Aatma	Amit	
2008	Bhoothnath	Dr. Behl	
2010	Prince	Tony (Bartender)	
2013	Kamasutra 3D	Administrator	
2013	Singh Saab the Great	Vasiyat	
2019	Sita	Baba	
2020	Durgamati	Jose	
2022	The Kashmir Files	Chief Minister of Jammu and Kashmir	
2023	1920: Horrors of the Heart	Rahasur	
2025	Phule	Punchayat Head Brahmin	

=== Television ===
Year	Show	Role
1994–1997	Shanti	Vijay
1995–2010	Aahat	Episodic Roles
1996–1997	Aarohan	Flying Officer Nikhil Sachdev
1997	Saturday Suspense	Rohan (Episode 15)
1997	Saturday Suspense	Episode 37
1997	Saturday Suspense	Inspector (Episode 39)
1999	Saturday Suspense	Episode 103
1999–2001	Rishtey	Episodic Roles
2001	Dushman	
2002	Ghar Sansaar	Advocate Aditya Shanbaug
2002	Vishnu Puran	Balram
2002	Mujhe Chaand Chahiye	
2004	Dekho Magar Pyaar Se	Bobby Bedi
2005	Raat Hone Ko Hai	Episode 165 - Episode 168
2005	Raat Hone Ko Hai	Episode 173 - Episode 176
2005	Kkusum	Shashank Deshmukh
2006	Kashmakash Zindagi Ki	Anirudh
2008	Ssshhhh...Phir Koi Hai	(Episode 146 & Episode 147)
2009	Ssshhhh...Phir Koi Hai	Chief Minister
2009	Yeh Pyar Na Hoga Kam	Mr. Shukla
2008	Astitva - Ek Pehchaan	
2008	Sharpe's Peril	Barabbas
2011–2012	Dekha Ek Khwaab	Maharaj Giriraj Singh
2011–2012	Veer Shivaji	Sonopant Pingle
2013	Adaalat	Professor Gajendra Mishra
2013	Savitri	Senapati
2013	Jo Biwi Se Kare Pyaar	Mr. Batra
2013–2014	Buddha	Guru Vachaspati
2014	Samvidhaan	C. Rajagopalachari
2014	Ek Hasina Thi	Navin Mathur
2014–2015	Dharmakshetra	Dronacharya
2015	Zindagi Wins	Colonel Shadab Akhtar
2015	SuperCops Vs SuperVillains	Arvind (Ep:Witches in Search of Gold)
2015–2016	Chakravartin Ashoka Samrat	Amatya Rakshas
2015–2016	Chalti Ka Naam Gaadi...Let's Go	Karan's Boss
2016	Dahleez	Manohar Sinha
2016	Saab Ji	Sridhar Shastri
2017	Peshwa Bajirao	Shripadrao Pant Pratinidhi
2017	Vighnaharta Ganesha	Tarkaksh
2017–2018	Woh Apna Sa	Dharmesh Jindal
2017–2020	Swarajyarakshak Sambhaji	Aurangzeb
2018	Laal Ishq	Episode 10
2018	Kasam Tere Pyaar Ki	Aayush Batra
2018–2019	Vikram Betaal Ki Rahasya Gatha	Varahamihira
2019	Aap Ke Aa Jane Se	Tejpratap Singh
2019	Ishq Mein Marjawan	Ranjeetpratap Singh
2019	Namah	Maharaj Daksha
2021	Lakshmi Ghar Aayi	Mangilal Kumar
2022	Pishachini	Pandit Ji
2022	Brij Ke Gopal	Chaitanya Mahaprabhu
2022–2023	Bindiya Sarkar	Kantilal Bharadwaj
2023–Present	Baatein Kuch Ankahee Si	Kuldeep Malhotra

=== web series ===
- Pyaar Yaa Paap
