= Shama Deshpande =

Indian actress

- Born: Bombay, Maharashtra, India
- Occupation: Actress
- Spouse(s): Kiran Deshpande (m. 1978; died 2000) Sai Ballal (m. 2001)
- Children: 2 daughter
- Father: Raja Gosavi

Shama Deshpande (née Gosavi) is an Indian actress known for her work in Hindi films and television, with a career spanning over four decades.

== Early life and career ==
Deshpande was born as Shama Gosavi to the legendary Marathi actor Raja Gosavi and Sunanda Gosavi, a homemaker. The youngest among four siblings, she grew up in a theatre-rich environment and developed a fascination for the performing arts by observing actors backstage and watching them prepare for their roles. Her mother died when she was 25, followed by her father's death a decade later when she was 35.

She began her acting journey by stepping in as a replacement in her father's stage plays, which gradually sparked her interest in the craft. Her first screen appearance came in the 1977 Marathi film Asla Navra Nako Ga Bai, where she played the role of the heroine's friend, a part offered by her father. She went on to appear in Marathi films like Ashtavinayak and Zidd, but found the struggle in the industry more challenging than expected, leading her to briefly step away from acting.

Over the years, she made occasional appearances in films such as Madhuchandrachi Raatra (1989), Jodidar (1997), Betaabi (1997), Pyaar To Hona Hi Tha (1998), Nidaan (2000), and Koi Aap Sa (2005).

Deshpande made her television debut with The Great Maratha, directed by Sanjay Khan and aired on DD National, where she portrayed Gopikabai, the Peshwin of the Maratha Empire. Her television career gained momentum with Zee TV’s Aashirwad, followed by prominent roles in successful Balaji Telefilms shows such as Ghar Ek Mandir, Kutumb, Kya Hadsaa Kya Haqeeqat, and Kahani Terrii Merrii. These appearances established her as a well-recognized face on Indian television.

She has worked alongside noted television actors including Hiten Tejwani, Ram Kapoor, Gauri Pradhan, Harshad Chopda, and Vivian Dsena. Her performances in shows like Meri Awaz Ko Mil Gayi Roshni, Dheere Dheere Se, and Udne Ki Aasha further strengthened her television career. She received widespread acclaim for her roles in Kis Desh Mein Hai Meraa Dil and Madhubala – Ek Ishq Ek Junoon, earning a nomination for the Indian Telly Award for Best Actress in a Supporting Role for the latter.

== Personal life ==
Deshpande married Kiran Deshpande in 1978 at the age of 18, and the couple had two daughters. Kiran passed away around the year 2000 after a prolonged illness. She later married actor Sai Ballal, her co-star from Kutumb.

== Filmography ==
=== Films ===
Year	Title	Role	Notes
1977	Asla Navra Nakoga Bai		
1979	Ashtavinayak	Nayana Chavan	
1980	Zidd		
1989	Eeshwar	Rani	
1989	Madhuchandrachi Raatra	Alka Deshmukh	
1990	Kuthe Kuthe Shodu Mi Tila	Mary	
1991	Ek Full Chaar Half		
1992	Hach Sunbaicha Bahu	Mukta	
1994	Chikat Navra	Kavita Bhusavalkar	
1995	The Don	Deepti	
1997	Jodidar	Landlord's wife	
1997	Vishwavidhaata		
1997	Betaabi	Mrs. Sumitra Ajmera	
1998	Pyaar To Hona Hi Tha	Anita Jaitley	
1998	Yamraaj	Shama	
1998	Kalicharan		
1999	Lohpurush		
1999	Manchala	Mrs. Shanti	
1999	Pyaar Koi Khel Nahin	Nisha's Mother	
1999	Nyaydaata		
1999	Aaya Toofan	Gul's mom	
1999	Aanganiya Sajavo Raaj		
1999	Karaycha Te Dankyat		
2000	Baaghi	Surya's Mother	
2000	Kaho Naa... Pyaar Hai		
2000	Papa The Great	Radha Didi	
2000	Nidaan	Veena S. Kamat	
2001	Maseeha	Parvati Srivastav	
2001	Hadh: Life on the Edge of Death		
2002	Aakheer	Prashant's mom	
2002	Kitne Door Kitne Paas	Geeta	
2003	Tada	Ajay's wife	
2003	Indian Babu	Asha Sharma	
2003	Raja Bhaiya		
2004	Mein Bikaaoo: On Sale		
2004	Krishna Cottage		
2004	Prarambh	Shanta	
2005	Dhamkee	Mrs. Geeta J Dholakia	
2005	Mumbai Xpress	Kishore's wife	
2005	Koi Aap Sa	Sumati	
2010	Paalkhi	Aai	
2015	Love Exchange	Mrs. Malti Sathe	
2019	D.A.T.E	Mrs. Sharma	Short film

=== Television ===
Year	Series	Role	Notes
1994	The Great Maratha	Gopikabai	
1998–1999	Aashirwad	Aparna Purushottam Choudhary	
1999	Muskaan	Ratna	
1999	X Zone		Episodic roles
1999–2000	Rishtey		Episodic roles
2000–2002	Ghar Ek Mandir	Gayatri	
2000–2001	Tanhaiyaan		
2000–2001	Kutumb	Gayatri Umesh Mittal	
2003	Kya Hadsaa Kya Haqeeqat	Mother	
2003–2004	Awaz – Dil Se Dil Tak	Tanya's Mother	
2003	Kahani Terrii Merrii		
2004	Prratima	Sumitra Tapendu Ghosh	
2005	Sarkarr:Rishton Ki Ankahi Kahani	Vineeta	
2005–2007	Kituu Sabb Jaantii Hai	Mrs. Purohit	
2007–2008	Meri Awaz Ko Mil Gayi Roshni	Meenakshi Malik	
2008–2010	Kabhi Saas Kabhi Bahu	Sujata Mallu Awasthi	
2008–2010	Kis Desh Mein Hai Meraa Dil	Gayatri Lalit Juneja	
2012–2014	Madhubala – Ek Ishq Ek Junoon	Radha Bhatia	
2022	Aashaon Ka Savera... Dheere Dheere Se	Savita Brijmohan Srivastav	
2024—present	Udne Ki Aasha	Savitri Deshmukh	

== Awards ==
- Nominated: Indian Telly Award for Best Actress in a Supporting Role for Madhubala – Ek Ishq Ek Junoon
