= Shital Thakkar =

Indian television and theater actress

- Born: Bombay, Maharashtra, India
- Occupation(s): Television actress, theater artist
- Years active: 1992–2022
- Height: 5 ft 3 in (1.60 m)
- Spouse: Ritesh Kothari (m. 2004)

Shital Thakkar is an Indian television and theatre artist. She has worked in some Hindi serials & few Gujarati plays. She has also done a bit of modelling. She has learned belly dancing.

== Career ==
She made her acting debut in an afternoon soap opera Swabhimaan. After that, she acted in many Hindi serials & portrayed mostly positive & supporting characters. She has also acted in Neeraj Vora's Gujarati play, Aflatoon. She played role of Sonia in famous serial Sarabhai vs Sarabhai.

== Television ==
Year	Show	Role
1992–1993	Parivartan	
1995–1997	Swabhimaan	Ritu
1998–2001	Aashirwad	Deepali
1999–2000	X Zone – Planchette	Episode 82 & Episode 83
2000	Aakash	
2000–2002	Koshish	Kaajal's Sister
2000–2003	Kahaani Ghar Ghar Kii	Preeti Agarwal
2002	Ssshhhh...Koi Hai – Anushaasan	Kiran (Episode 45)
2003	Ssshhhh...Koi Hai – Vikraal Aur Haunted House	Reva (Episode 93)
2003–2004	Arzoo Hai Tu	
2004	Vikraal Aur Gabraal – Anushaasan	Kiran (Episode 25)
2004	Hatim	Maya
2004–2005	Ye Meri Life Hai	Poornima
2005	Kareena Kareena	Tarana
2005–2006	Sarabhai vs Sarabhai	Sonia Sarabhai Painter
2005–2006	Kituu Sabb Jaantii Hai	Kajal
2006–2007	Risshton Ki Dor	Shubhangi Abhayankar
2007	Woh Rehne Waali Mehlon Ki	Pallavi Manav Kumar
2009	Burey Bhi Hum Bhale Bhi Hum	Jyotika Kaivalya Popat
2014	Savdhaan India	Rituu (Episode 486) / Rashmi (Episode 682) / Shweta (Episode 862)
2014	Madhubala - Ek Ishq Ek Junoon	Tara Pratap Singh
2014	Adaalat – Khooni Putla : Part 1 & Part 2	Pooja Talwar (Episode 328 & Episode 329)
2014–2016	Satrangi Sasural	Neelima Tripathi
2016	Rishton Ka Saudagar - Baazigar	Parul Kailashnath Trivedi
2018–2019	Vish Ya Amrit: Sitara	Lakshmi Ratanpratap Singh
2021–2022	Sasural Simar Ka 2	Sandhya Gajendra Oswal
