= Rohit Roy =

Indian actor

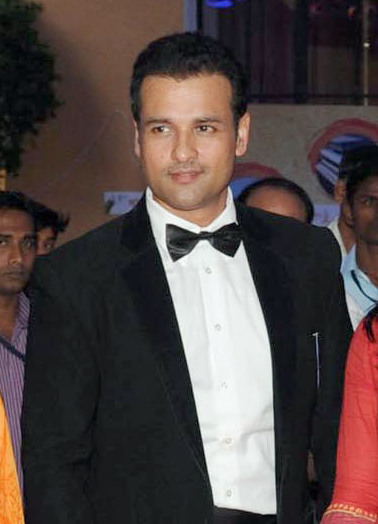
- Rohit Roy in 2014
- Born: Rohit Bose Roy; 5 April 1968 (age 58) or 5 April 1969 (age 57); Nagpur, Maharashtra, India
- Occupation: Actor
- Spouse: Manasi Joshi Roy (m. 1999)
- Children: 1
- Relatives: Ronit Roy (brother); Sharman Joshi (brother-in-law)

Rohit Bose Roy (born 5 April 1968/1969) is an Indian actor who is known for his work in several television and film productions. He is best known for his role in Hindi television serials such as Des Mein Niklla Hoga Chand on Star Plus and Swabhimaan on DD National.

Besides working in television series, Roy has also acted in notable Bollywood movies such as Kaabil, Ek Khiladi Ek Haseena, Fashion, Apartment and Plan among others. He starred in the movie Shootout at Lokhandwala, in which he portrayed the character Fattu, one of the gang members. Roy has also directed a short film named Rice Plate – as a part of the anthology film Dus Kahaniyaan. Roy launched his own fashion brand in the year 2020, Rohit Roy for Styched, in association with Styched Life.

== Early life and background ==
Roy is a Bengali and he had spent his formative years in Ahmedabad, Gujarat. He did his schooling from St. Xavier's School, Ahmedabad. He is also an alumnus of St. Xavier's College, Ahmedabad. He is the younger son of businessman Brothindranath and Dolly Bose Roy. His elder brother, Ronit Roy is a well-known television and film actor.

== Personal life ==
Roy married actress Manasi Joshi Roy on 23 June 1999. They have one daughter together, Kiara. He can also speak Gujarati fluently. Rohit is also an avid Vipassana practitioner and has shared his personal views during one of his interviews with Rahul Rao (Govu).

== Filmography ==
=== Films ===
Key
†	Denotes feature films that are not yet released

Year	film	Role	Notes
1994	Jazbaat	Vishal Shashtri	
1996	Laalchee	Amar Prabhakar Choudhry	
1997	Hamein Jahan Pyar Mile		
1997	Ankhon Mein Tum Ho	Prem	
1997	Achena Atithi	Prem	
1997	Koi Kisise Kum Nahin	Amar	
2000	Glamour Girl		
2000	Hum To Mohabbat Karega	Rohit	
2002	Kaante	special appearance in song, "Ishq Samundar"	
2003	LOC Kargil	Capt Shashibhushan Ghildyal	
2004	Plan	Omi	
2005	Ek Khiladi Ek Haseena	Rohit	
2005	Kuchh Meetha Ho Jaye	Pilot Vikram Sinha	
2007	Dus Kahaniyaan	Dev	(Anthology film) story Gubbare
2007	Shootout at Lokhandwala	Fattu	
2007	Delhii Heights	Bobby	
2008	Fashion	Kartik Suri	
2008	Don Muthu Swami	Preetam	
2010	Apartment	Karan Malhotra	
2010	Mittal v/s Mittal	Karan Mittal	
2011	Bhorer Alo	Subhankar Bose	Bengali film
2011	Alibaug		
2013	Mrs. Sen	Somnath	Bengali film
2014	Sada Canvas		Bengali film
2015	Calendar Girls	Timmy	
2017	Kaabil	Amit Shellar	
2018	I.M.A. Gujju	Siddhraj Zala	Gujarati film
2018	Paltan	Maj. Cheema	
2021	Mumbai Saga	Jaykar Shinde (Baba)	
2022	Forensic	Abhay Khanna	Zee5 film
2022	Verses of War	Captain Nawaz	
2023	Chengiz	ACP Samir Sinha	Bengali film
2024	IRaH	Hari Singh	
2025	Controll	Spydro / Shekhar Sisodiya	

== Television ==
Year	Serial	Role
1995-1998	Swabhimaan	Rishabh Malhotra
	Khauff	Episode 9 & Episode 10
2002–2003	Kkusum	Abhay Kapoor
2003	Kya Hadsaa Kya Haqeeqat - Karzz	Nakul Kapoor
2003	Kittie Party	
2003–2004	Bhabhi	Raj Malhotra
2004–2005	Des Mein Niklla Hoga Chand	Yash Kapoor
2005–2006	Sarkarr:Rishton Ki Ankahi Kahani	Karan Pratapsingh
2006–2007	Viraasat	Rahul Lamba
2020	Locked in Love	
2023	Fear Factor: Khatron Ke Khiladi 13	Contestant (Quit)
2024	Karmma Calling	Satyajit Mehra
2026	Chumbak	Ronit Roy Chaudhary

- Tujhpe Dil Qurbaan as Lt. Karan
- Swabhimaan as Rishabh Malhotra
- Kabhie Kabhie as Vijay Sinha
- Waaris
- Saturday Suspense - Haan Maine Coreena Peters Ka Khoon Kiya Hai as Kapil (Episode 95)
- Rishtey – Ajnabee as Aman
- Hera Pheri as Sanjay Premi
- Rishtey – Sparsh as Vineet
- Baat Ban Jaaye as Amit Kapoor
- Gubbare – Bollywood Bite as Roxy
- Milan as Ranbir Kapoor
- Hum Hain Dilwale as Vijay
- Nach Baliye 1 as Contestant
- Wild Ten as Host
- Jhalak Dikhhla Jaa 2 as Host
- Yeh Hai Jalwa as Contestant
- Jhalak Dikhhla Jaa 3 as Host
- Dil Jeetegi Desi Girl as Host
- Sajda Tere Pyaar Mein as Mahendra Pratap Singh
- Hitler Didi as Major Kabir Chaudhary / Saheb
- Jhalak Dikhhla Jaa 6 as Contestant
- The Bachelorette India as Host
- Encounter as Senior Inspector Milind Mandlik
- Peterson Hill as Kishorilal Chadda / Jaggu
- Khooni Saaya as Host
- Memories as Siddharth
- Shakti - Astitva Ke Ehsaas Ki as Nishant Bhalla
- Sanjivani as Vardhaan

=== Dubbing roles ===
Film title	Actor(s)	Character(s)	Dub language	Original language	Original Year release	Dub Year release	Notes
Guardians of the Galaxy Vol. 2	Chris Pratt	Peter Quill / Star-Lord	Hindi	English	2017	2017	
Avengers: Infinity War	Chris Pratt	Peter Quill / Star-Lord	Hindi	English	2018	2018	
Guardians of the Galaxy Vol. 3	Chris Pratt	Peter Quill / Star-Lord	Hindi	English	2023	2023	

== See also ==
- List of Indian television actors
- List of Indian male film actors
- List of Indian film actors
