= Sarrkkar – Risshton Ki Ankahi Kahani =

Sarrkkar: Rishton Ki Ankahi Kahani is a political family drama that aired on Zee TV in 2005–2006.

Penned by Shobhaa De, the serial was produced by Siddhant Cinevision. The initial family structure in the series held a resemblance to Gandhi family, according to some.

== Cast ==
- Divya Seth as Priyamvada Veer Pratapsingh
- Rajat Kapoor as Veer Pratapsingh: Priyamvada's husband; Kunal, Karan and Kritika's father
- Ronit Roy as Kunal Pratapsingh
- Rohit Roy as Karan Pratapsingh
- Shweta Salve as Shweta: Karan's wife
- Mouli Ganguly as Kritika: Priyamvada and Veer's daughter
- Manav Gohil as Laksh Pandit: Urvashi's childhood friend
- Sandeep Rajora as Sudhanshu: Kritika's husband
- Manini Mishra as Yaana
- Kanika Kohli as Natasha: Karan's friend
- Govind Namdev as Kashinath Trivedi
- Amar Talwar as Amit Gupta
- Shakti Singh as Anand Sehgal
- Anju Mahendru as Anita
- Gajendra Chauhan as Shyam
- Abir Goswami as Madan
- Shama Deshpande as Vineeta
- Zeb Khan as Sangeeta
- Tara Mehta as Zoya
- Abhay Bhargava as Yashpal
- Gopi Desai as Asha
- Tarun Khanna as Prakash Kulkarni
