= Abhishek Bajaj =

Indian actor

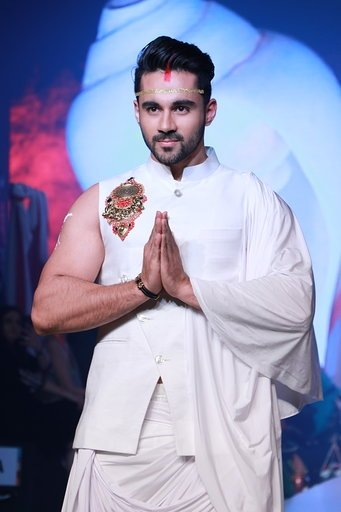
- Bajaj at the Bombay Times Fashion Week, 2020
- Born: 24 October 1992 (age 34); New Delhi, India
- Education: Delhi University
- Occupation: Actor
- Years active: 2011–present
- Known for: Meri Bhabhi; Dil Deke Dekho; Chandigarh Kare Aashiqui; Babli Bouncer; Jubilee Talkies; Bigg Boss 19
- Height: 6 ft 0 in (1.83 m)

Abhishek Bajaj (born 24 October 1992) is an Indian actor who works in Hindi films and television. He made his film debut with Student of the Year 2 under Dharma Productions. Bajaj gained recognition for his roles in films like Chandigarh Kare Aashiqui and Babli Bouncer. In 2025, he participated in Bigg Boss 19.

== Early life ==
Abhishek was born in New Delhi, India, into a Punjabi family to Parveen Bajaj, a Japanese interpreter, and Anita Bajaj. He has two sisters named Ekta and Ambika Bajaj. He completed his schooling in Delhi where he reportedly scored 90% in his HSC (Class 12), and graduated from Delhi University. During his college years, he participated in stage plays and modeling shows, which helped develop his interest in acting. Although he initially aspired to become a CBI officer, his involvement in performing arts sparked his passion for acting. He auditioned for a commercial and was selected.

== Career ==
He began his career as a model before transitioning to television. He made his acting debut with Sony Entertainment Television's Parvarrish – Kuchh Khattee Kuchh Meethi (2011) and gained recognition for his role as Rahul in Dil De Ke Dekho (Sab TV). He has appeared in shows such as Ek Nanad Ki Khushiyon Ki Chabhi Meri Bhabhi, Bitti Business Wali, Silsila Pyaar Ka and Zindagi Ke Crossroads.

He made his film debut with a supporting role in Karan Johar's teen drama Student of the Year 2 (2019), playing Abhishek Sharma (A captain of Pishorilal College team), and also appeared in the web series Boys With Toys, co-starring Vivaan Shah and Zoya Afroz, was released on an OTT platform. This was followed by the films Kabaad: The Coin, Chandigarh Kare Aashiqui and web series Your Honor in 2021. In the same year in December, He appeared on the magazine cover of Entitle Magazine. In 2022, He starred in the movie Babli Bouncer, did five ads campaign for Muscleblaze Vite Daily multivitamin, Dr Morepan Health Muscle Food 100% Whey Protein, Muscle Blaze Fit and BGreen plant protein, also menswear ad for Marks and Spencer (M&S) India. A year later, He did an ads campaign for Gillete India. In 2024, He appeared in a music video "Dooriyan" opposite actress Zaara Yesmin, landed a web series "Nama Cool" as UP Character Chakku Pandey, and starred as Ayaan Grover in the television drama "Jubilee Talkies – Shohrat Shiddat Mohabbat", and appeared in Mahasangam crossover episodes of "Pukaar- Dil Se Dil Tak".

In early 2025, He walked as a showstopper for designer Alok Agarwal Jaipur Couture Show. In August 2025, he joined Colors TV's reality show Bigg Boss season 19 as a contestant, but was eliminated after a single fellow contestant voted him out rather than through audience voting, finishing in 11th place. Despite his early exit, his gameplay and instincts in the house were praised by media commentators, and he became one of the most talked-about contestants. During the Family Week episodes, Bajaj received significant support both inside and outside the house. Media reports noted that contestants’ family members expressed admiration for his gameplay and described him as a strong contender who should have remained in the competition longer. In Dec 2025, He appeared in 2 ads, Ghar Soaps and OPPO India. In January 2026, he collaborated with Pranit More on the rap song ‘Strong Vs Smart’, promoting Beast Games season 2. In July 2026, he appeared in a Biryani ad for the brand Daawat alongside his friend Awez Darbar. In September 2026, He appeared in NIVEA India's "Soft Daily UV" advertising campaign, followed by NEXA's promotional campaign for the updated Maruti Suzuki Baleno, titled "Dare to Go Glam". In October 2026, he appeared in the music video “Sherdil – Main Aaj Vi,” released under the record label The LSD Music. The project marked his debut as a singer and concept creator.

== Personal life ==
In 2019, Bajaj was involved in a car accident and sustained injuries to his hand, requiring 16 stitches. He later resumed his professional commitments.

He was previously married, and the marriage ended in a mutual and amicable divorce after separating in 2020.

== Filmography ==
=== Films ===
†	Denotes films that have not yet been released

Year	Title	Role	Notes	Ref
2019	Student of the Year 2	Abhishek Sharma	Supporting role	
2020	Rani Ka Raja	Rohit Bansal	Lead role	
2021	Kabaad: The Coin	Sam	Lead role	
2021	Chandigarh Kare Aashiqui	Sandy	Supporting role	
2022	Babli Bouncer	Viraj Kaushik	Supporting role	
2024	Kya Masti Kya Dhoom	Bobby Chadda	Lead role	

=== Television ===
Year	Serial	Role	Notes
2011	Hitler Didi		Recurring role
2011–2013	Parvarrish – Kuchh Khattee Kuchh Meethi	Nitin Mehta	Supporting role
2013–2014	Ek Nanad Ki Khushiyon Ki Chaabi – Meri Bhabhi	Ishaan Shergill	Supporting role
2014	Love By Chance		Episodic role
2014	Halla Bol 2		Recurring role
2015	Hangover Wala Love	Prashant	Episodic role
2015	Rumm Pumm Po	Vicky	Recurring role
2015	Aahat (Indian TV series)		Episodic role
2015	Darr Sabko Lagta Hai		1 episode
2015–2016	Santoshi Maa	Sanket	
2016	SuperCops Vs Super Villains	King	Episodic role
2016	Silsila Pyaar Ka	Sanket Tiwari	
2016–2017	Dil Deke Dekho	Rahul Shastri	Lead role
2018	Bitti Business Wali	Mahi	Lead role
2018	Zindagi Ke Crossroads	Ankit	Episodic role
2020	Savdhaan India	Shyam	Episodic role
2024	Pukaar - Dil Se Dil Tak	Ayaan Grover	2 Episodes
2024	Jubilee Talkies	Ayaan Grover	Lead role
2025	Bigg Boss 19	Contestant	11th place

=== Web series ===
Year	Title	Role	Notes	Ref
2016	Life Lafde Aur Bandiyan	Spunky Narula	Recurring role	
2019	Boys with Toys	Varun	Recurring role	
2021	Your Honor	Aman	Supporting role	
2024	NamaCool	Chakku Panday	Supporting role	

=== Music videos ===
Year	Title	Singer(s)	Ref.
2019	Royee Jande Naina	Nitin Gupta	
2021	Kinni Varri	Rakesh Maini	
2021	Dil Mein Jo	Jyotica Tangri	
2023	Dooriyan	P-ush	
2023	Barbaad	Sakshi Holkar	
2025	Rehbara 2.0	Rizwan Nagina	
2026	Sherdil - Main Aaj Vi	Abhishek Bajaj & Hashmat Khan	

== Awards and nominations ==
Year	Award	Category	Work	Result	Ref
2022	Indian Television Academy Awards	Best Performance by an Actor in a Negative Role	Chandigarh Kare Aashiqui	Nominated	
2022	Indian Television Academy Awards	Best Actor in a Supporting Role	Chandigarh Kare Aashiqui	Nominated	
2022	International Iconic Awards	Most Promising Actor of the Year	Chandigarh Kare Aashiqui	Won	
2022	Universal India Awards	Best Actor in a Negative Role	Chandigarh Kare Aashiqui	Won	
2023	Boogle Bollywood Ballistic Awards	Ballistic Performer	Babli Bouncer	Won	
2025	Whos Next Influencers Award	Newsmaker of the Year	Himself	Won	
2026	Radio City Mumbai Icons Award	Most Iconic Reality Star	Bigg Boss 19	Won	
2026	Boogle Bollywood Ballistic Awards	Most Promising Bollywood Actor	Himself	Nominated	
