= Shishir Sharma =

Indian actor

- Born: 10 January 1955 (age 71)
- Occupation: Actor
- Years active: 1995–present
- Children: 1

Shishir Sharma (born 10 January 1955) is an Indian film and television actor. He appeared in Zee TV's Ghar Ki Lakshmi Betiyann, and is known for playing the role of Jagmohan Prasad in Yahaaan Main Ghar Ghar Kheli. Currently, he can be seen in second season of the web-show Permanent Roommates on TVFPlay. Sharma has acted in more than 40 films and TV serials including Story of a Lonely Goldfish, Swabhimaan, Bombay Boys, Sarkar Raj and The Second Best Exotic Marigold Hotel. His film Mission Raniganj with Gaurav Prateek was released on 6 October 2023

== Television ==
Year	Show	Channel	Role
1995–1997	Swabhimaan	DD National	KD
1998	Saaya	Sony Entertainment Television	Krishnamurthy
1998	C.I.D. - Kissa Raat Ke Shikaar Ka : Part 1 & Part 2	Sony Entertainment Television	Professor Kumar (Episode 5 & Episode 6)
1998	C.I.D. - The Case Of The Talkative Skeleton : Part 1 & Part 2	Sony Entertainment Television	Arjun (Episode 27 & Episode 28)
1998–1999	Aashirwad	Zee TV	
1998–2001	Hip Hip Hurray	Zee TV	Mr. Joshi
1999	Waaris	Zee TV	
1999–2000	Kanyadaan	Sony Entertainment Television	
1999–2000	Abhimaan	DD National	D.I.G.
2000–2001	Sukanya	B4U	
2001 - 2002	Sansaar	Zee TV	
2002–2003	Achanak 37 Saal Baad	Sony Entertainment Television	Pratap
2002–2003	Lipstick	Zee TV	Jagan Luthra
2002–2005; 2007	Kumkum – Ek Pyara Sa Bandhan	Star Plus	Brijbhushan Wadhwa
2003–2004	Aandhi	Zee TV	Chandni's father
2004-2005	Prratima	Sahara One	Tapendu Ghosh
2004–2005	Koie Jane Na	Star Plus	Rudra Rajvansh / Kailash Rajvansh
2004–2005	Saathiya – Pyar Ka Naya Ehsaas	Sahara One	Anish Oberoi
2004-2008	Adhuri Ek Kahani	Zee Marathi	Arash
2006–2007	Ghar Ki Lakshmi Betiyann	Zee TV	Nekchand Kapadia
2007	Sangam	Star Plus	Deena Nath
2008–2009	Jaane Kya Baat Hui	Colors TV	Jawahar Sareen
2008-2010	Miley Jab Hum Tum	Star One	Shashi Bhushan
2009–2010	Namak Haraam	Real TV	Indrajeet Sehgal
2009–2012	Yahaan Main Ghar Ghar Kheli	Zee TV	Jagmohan "Jaggu" Prasad
2012–2013	The Buddy Project	Channel V India	Principal Ramanujam
2014–2015	Shastri Sisters	Colors TV	Fufaji
2015–2016	Mohi	Star Plus	Ayush's father-in-law
2017	Love Ka Hai Intezaar	Star Plus	Rana
2018	Bard of Blood	Netflix	Arun Joshi

== Filmography ==
- All films are in Hindi, unless mentioned otherwise.

Year	Film	Role	Notes
1996	Chakravyuh		
1998	Satya	Inquiry Committee Head	
1998	Bombay Boys	ACP Shirodkar	
2000	Millennium Stars		Malayalam Film
2002	Om Jai Jagadish	Narayan Pillai	
2006	Fanaa	Defence Minister	
2008	Love Story 2050	Mr. Bedi	
2008	Jalsa	Janardhan Sahu	Telugu film
2008	Sarkar Raj	Sunil Shinde	
2009	Blue Oranges	Commissioner Dixit	
2009	Kurbaan	Professor Qureshi	
2013	Jayantabhai Ki Luv Story	Neha sharma's ( Bhadotri) father	
2013	Premsutra	Malavika's Father	
2014	Gandhi of the Month	Natu Sr.	
2014	Manjunath	Golu's Father	
2014	Mary Kom	National Coach	
2015	Tanu Weds Manu: Returns	Datto’s father	
2015	Talvar	J.K. Dixit, the new CBI Chief	
2016	Dangal	Head of Department of the NSA	
2017	Chhoti Si Guzaarish	Shishir	Short film
2018	Raazi	Pakistani Brigadier Pervez Syed	
2018	Bucket List	Surgeon in hospital	Marathi film; special appearance
2018	Sammohanam	As an Actor	Telugu film; special appearance
2018	Shinaakht	Liaqat	Short film
2019	Uri: The Surgical Strike	General Arjun Singh Rawat, COAS	
2019	72 Hours: Martyr Who Never Died	Colonel S.N.Tandon	
2019	Jersey	Coach Atul	Telugu film
2019	Bombay Rose	Anthony Pereira	
2019	Chhichhore	Dr. Kasbekar	
2020	Disco Raja	Dr. Shishir	Telugu films
2020	Maa Vintha Gaadha Vinuma	Siddhu's father	Telugu films
2020	Bombhaat	Professor Aacharya	Telugu films
2021	Sreekaram	Karthik's manager	Telugu films
2021	Mera Fauji Calling	Major Roy	
2021	The Big Bull	Rajesh Mishra, Chief Editor	
2021	Ye Shaam Mastaani	Avinash	Short film
2021	Cobalt Blue	Mr. Dixit	Netflix film
2021	Jersey	Coach Anand	
2023	Gaslight	Dr. Shekhawat	
2023	Mission Raniganj	Om Prakash Dayal	
2024	Chashma	Principal	Short film
2024	The Sadist	Physiologist	Short film
2025	The Taj Story	Dr. Shrinivas Patel	
2025	Rasa	Dr. Shrinivas Patel	
2026	Ikka	Harshvardhan Gaur	Netflix film
2026	Ramayana: Part 1	Vasishtha	

== Web series ==
Year	Series	Role	Notes
2015	Permanent Roommates	Brijmohan Nagpal, father of Tanya	3 seasons 17 episodes
2017	Rise		
2018 - 2019	What the Folks	Kiran Solanki (Nikhil's father)	Seasons 2 and 3
2018	What's your status	Doctor	
2019	Made in Heaven	Mr. Sinha	Episode 6
2019 - 2021	City of Dreams	Ramnik Bhai	Hindi, Marathi and 5 other languages
2019	Bard of Blood	Arun Joshi	
2024	Dil Dosti Dilemma	Naana	
