= Mayoori Kango =

Indian advertising executive and former actress

- Born: August 15, 1982 (age 44); Aurangabad (now Chhatrapati Sambhajinagar), Maharashtra, India
- Education: Baruch College
- Occupations: Advertising executive, former actress
- Years active: 1995–2009
- Spouse: Aditya Dhillon (m. 2003)

Mayoori Kango (born 15 August 1982) is an Indian advertising executive and former actress. She made her film debut in Saeed Akhtar Mirza's Naseem (1995) and played the lead in Mahesh Bhatt's Papa Kehte Hai (1996), later appearing in Hindi films such as Betaabi (1997), Hogi Pyaar Ki Jeet (1999) and Badal (2000), as well as several television serials.

After leaving acting, Kango earned an MBA in New York and built a career in digital advertising, holding senior roles at Zenith, Performics and Google India, which she joined in 2019. Since August 2025 she has been chief executive officer of Publicis Global Delivery, part of Publicis Groupe.

== Acting career ==
Kango was still at school when, on a visit to her mother in Mumbai, she met director Saeed Akhtar Mirza. He offered her the title role in Naseem (1995), a film set against the demolition of the Babri Masjid. She initially turned it down because of her HSC board examinations, but accepted after further discussions with Mirza.

Impressed by her performance, Mahesh Bhatt cast her as the female lead in Papa Kehte Hai (1996). The film was not a commercial success, but her performance was generally well received. She went on to appear in Betaabi (1997), Hogi Pyaar Ki Jeet (1999) and Badal (2000), made special appearances in song sequences in films such as Jung (2000), and acted in the Telugu film Vamsi (2000). Her last film appearance was in Kashmir Hamara Hai (2008).

In the early 2000s Kango moved to television, appearing in serials including Dollar Bahu (2001), Kittie Party (2002), Kkusum (2003) and Karishma – The Miracles of Destiny (2003), in which she played the daughter of Karisma Kapoor's character. She also performed on stage in the play Kuch Tum Kaho Kuch Hum Kahein.

== Business career ==
After moving to New York with her husband, Kango earned an MBA in marketing and finance from Baruch College's Zicklin School of Business. She began working in advertising in 2007 as an associate media manager at the digital agency 360i, and later worked at Resolution Media and at Digitas, where she was associate director of media. From 2012 to 2016 she was chief digital officer at the media agency Zenith, and from 2016 to 2019 she was managing director of Performics, a digital performance agency owned by Publicis Groupe.

In 2019 Kango joined Google India as industry head – agency business, and she spent more than six years at the company. In August 2025 she rejoined Publicis Groupe as chief executive officer of Publicis Global Delivery, becoming part of the group's global executive leadership team; she also leads its India delivery centre.

== Personal life ==
Kango was educated at St. Francis De Sales School and Deogiri College in Chhatrapati Sambhajinagar. Her mother is a stage actress, which sparked her interest in acting.

She married Aditya Dhillon, a non-resident Indian, in her hometown on 28 December 2003. The couple have a son, born in 2011.

== Filmography ==
=== Film ===
Year	Title	Role	Director	Notes
1995	Naseem	Naseem	Saeed Akhtar Mirza	
1996	Papa Kehte Hai	Sweety Anand	Mahesh Bhatt	
1997	Betaabi	Reshma	Rajesh Kumar Singh	
1999	Hogi Pyaar Ki Jeet	Preeti Singh	P. Vasu	
1999	Meray Apney			(Unreleased)
2000	Badal	Soni	Raj Kanwar	
2000	Papa The Great		K. Bhagyaraj	Special Appearance (Song)
2000	Jung		Sanjay Gupta	Special Appearance (Song)
2000	Shikari		N. Chandra	Item Song
2000	Vamsi	Sneha	B. Gopal	
2001	Jeetenge Hum			
2008	Kashmir Hamara Hai			

=== Music videos ===
Year	Title	Artist(s)	Ref.
1997	Ram Ratan Dhan Payo		

=== Television ===
- Kya Hadsaa Kya Haqeeqat - Kutumb (2004) TV series
- Kya Hadsaa Kya Haqeeqat - Kayamath (2004) TV series
- Karishma – The Miracles of Destiny (2003) TV series as Mansi
- Kkusum (2003) TV series as Saakshi Aaryaman Oberoi (new)
- Kittie Party (2002) TV series
- Rangoli (2001)
- Dollar Bahu (2001) TV series
- Thoda Gham Thodi Khushi (2001) TV series as Neha
- Kaahin Kissii Roz - Monica Bose Face Surgery as Sneha
- Nargis - DD1

== Theatre ==
- Kuch Tum Kaho Kuch Hum Kahein... Zarina Khanna
