= Aatma (2006 film) =

2006 film directed by Deepak Ramsay

- Promotional release poster
- Directed by: Deepak Ramsay
- Written by: M. Salim
- Produced by: Tulsi Ramsay
- Starring: Kapil Jhaveri; Neha Bajpai; Deep Dhillon; Amriena; Mukesh Tiwari; Sadashiv Amrapurkar
- Cinematography: Gangu Ramsay
- Music by: Anu Malik; J.Gopal Prasad; Anchal Talesara; P.Sameer
- Production companies: Parallel Films; Tulsi Ramsey Productions
- Release date: 19 May 2006
- Running time: 107 minutes
- Country: India
- Language: Hindi

Aatma (lit. 'Soul'), also known as The Ghost, is a 2006 Indian Hindi-language horror film directed by Deepak Ramsay and starring Kapil Jhaveri and Neha Bajpai in the lead roles. The film is written by M. Salim and produced by Tulsi Ramsay for Parallel Films and Tulsi Ramsay Productions. Aatma was first released in India on 19 May 2006.

== Cast ==
- Kapil Jhaveri as Dr. Aman Mehra
- Neha Bajpai as Neha A. Mehra
- Vikram Singh as Inspector Siddharth Ghoshal
- Amriena as Aarti Kumar
- Mukesh Tiwari as Vikram Malhotra
- Sadashiv Amrapurkar as Advocate Khurana
- Beena Banerjee as Suman (as Beena)
- Amit Behl as Amit Chauhan
- Deep Dhillon as Avinash Malhotra
- Brij Gopal as Morgue Attendant
- Dinesh Hingoo as Phiroz Khadewala
- Yatin Karyekar as Yatin
- Upasna Singh as Shanta
- Rajeev Verma as Suman's husband

== Music ==
The film's music was composed by Anu Malik, with lyrics by Sameer.

1. "Bahon mein Chhupa Lo" - Sunidhi Chauhan
2. "Chori Chori Tum Dil Chura Lo" - Sadhana Sargam
3. "Ishq Huwa mujhe" - Asha Bhosle
4. "Kya Kare" - Sonu Nigam, Sunidhi Chauhan
5. "Sehma Sehma" - Khushboo Jain
6. "Tere Chehre Se Nazar Nahin" - Sonu Nigam, Sunidhi Chauhan

== Home media ==
In 2023, Aatma was released on Blu-ray by Mondo Macabro as part of the Bollywood Horror Collection boxed set, which also includes the Ramsay brothers-directed films Bandh Darwaza (1990), Purani Haveli (1989), Purana Mandir (1984), and Veerana (1988).
