= Babli Bouncer =

2022 Indian film by Madhur Bhandarkar

- Official release poster
- Directed by: Madhur Bhandarkar
- Written by: Amit Joshi; Aradhana Debnath; Madhur Bhandarkar
- Produced by: Vineet Jain; Amrita Pandey
- Starring: Tamannaah Bhatia; Abhishek Bajaj; Sahil Vaid; Saanand Verma
- Cinematography: Himman Dhamija
- Edited by: Manish Pradhan
- Music by: Tanishk Bagchi; Karan Malhotra
- Production companies: Star Studios; Junglee Pictures
- Distributed by: Disney+ Hotstar
- Release date: 23 September 2022
- Running time: 118 minutes
- Country: India
- Language: Hindi

Babli Bouncer is a 2022 Indian Hindi-language drama film directed by Madhur Bhandarkar and produced by Vineet Jain and Amrita Pandey under the banners Star Studios and Junglee Pictures. The film stars Tamannaah Bhatia as Babli, a street-smart woman who becomes a bouncer at a nightclub. It premiered on 23 September 2022 on Disney+ Hotstar.

At the 2023 Filmfare OTT Awards, Babli Bouncer received four nominations, including Best Web Original Film and Best Actress in a Web Original Film for Tamannaah Bhatia.

== Plot ==
Babli Tanwar is an uneducated young girl from Asola-Fatehpur, a small village near Delhi, where most people are bouncers. Despite being of a marriageable age, she still hasn't finished her 10th-grade education, and her teacher (nicknamed "Drum") is very upset with her and looks down upon her. Babli has also trained to be a bouncer since childhood.

At the wedding of the sarpanch's daughter, Babli meets Drum's son, Viraj Kaushik, who recently returned from London after five years of study. Babli develops a crush on him and tries to get close to him. As Viraj lives in Delhi, Babli plans to go to Delhi to see him. At the same time, Babli starts to receive marriage proposals. She turns them all down, as she likes Viraj.

Babli's friend since childhood, Kukku, who has long had a crush on her, learns she is receiving marriage proposals and feels insecure. He and his family bring his marriage proposal to Babli's family too. Babli's family likes Kukku but she considers him a friend. After realising that Kukku works as a bouncer at a nightclub in Delhi, Babli decides to use him to get herself to Delhi. She pretends to like Kukku and asks him to get her a job in Delhi. She tells him they can discuss marriage after a year. Kukku's nightclub is hiring a female bouncer, so he refers her, and she gets the job.

In Delhi, Babli meets Viraj several times. At his birthday party, she drunkenly confesses her feelings for him. He rejects and insults her for being uneducated and uncivil. Babli is heartbroken and cuts her ties with Viraj. Upon hearing his words, Babli decides to change herself and improve her social status, not to impress Viraj but for herself.

She enrols in a class to continue her education, learns English, and gradually progresses.

Viraj and his friends visit Babli's club, and he quarrels with the playboy son of a high-profile politician. The playboy points a gun at Viraj's head and threatens to kill him. Babli arrives at the scene and solves it peacefully with her courage and brain. Viraj is impressed and regrets rejecting her. He begins to chase her, trying to win back her heart. Babli tries to avoid him a few times and finally rejects him, saying she no longer loves him.

Another night at the club, gangsters abduct a female customer. They force her into their car and flee, planning to rape or kill her. Babli sees the incident and decides to save the girl. She defeats all the gangsters on the road and saves the girl. The incident is reported by the media and Babli suddenly becomes famous and popular. The Chief Minister of her state awards her a medal of bravery.

With the help of a wealthy customer whom Babli saved before, she opens her training centre to train female bouncers who want to follow in her footsteps.

== Cast ==
- Tamannaah Bhatia as Babli Tanwar (Babli Bouncer)
- Abhishek Bajaj as Viraj Kaushik
- Sahil Vaid as Kukku
- Saanand Verma as Jaggi Paaji
- Saurabh Shukla as Gajanan Tanwar, Babli's father
- Supriya Shukla as Ganga Tanwar, Babli's mother
- Sabyasachi Chakrabarty as Saurav Dutta (Uncle Ji)
- Mukesh Tyagi as Tyagiji, bar owner
- Karan Singh Chhabra as Mannu
- Khabir Mehta as Golu Tanwar, Babli's brother
- Yamini Das as Chitra Madam "Dhol", Viraj's mother
- Upasna Singh as Dolly Chaddha
- Ashwini Kalsekar as Bobby, coach of bouncers
- Rajesh Khera as Inspector Amarnath Singh
- Priyam Saha as Pinky "Pinku", Babli's friend
- Ankit Mohan as Chirag Rana aka Jugs, MLA's son
- Anushka Lohar as Natasha "Nats"
- Vijay Raaz as the narrator

== Production ==
=== Casting ===
In February 2022, Tamannaah Bhatia was confirmed to be cast in lead role as a female bouncer. In the same month, Abhishek Bajaj was confirmed to be a part of the cast.

=== Development ===
The film was announced in February 2022. The makers of the film arranged a muhurat puja for the team after the filming started.

=== Filming ===
The principal photography of the film started in mid-February 2022. The first schedule took place at Mohali, Punjab with an outdoor shoot, followed by New Delhi and was completed within 20 days. The final schedule took place in Mumbai from 22 April 2022. The film was wrapped up on 5 May 2022 in Mumbai.

== Music ==
Babli Bouncer

Soundtrack album by Tanishk Bagchi and Karan Malhotra
- Released: 21 September 2022
- Genre: Feature film soundtrack
- Length: 11:16
- Label: Zee Music Company

Official audio
- Babli Bouncer - Full Album on YouTube

The songs are composed by Tanishk Bagchi and Karan Malhotra. The lyrics are written by Tanishk Bagchi, Shabbir Ahmed and Manaswi Mohata.

No.	Title	Lyrics	Music	Singer(s)	Length
1.	"Mad Banke"	Shabbir Ahmed	Tanishk Bagchi	Asees Kaur, Romy	3:06
2.	"Babli Shor Macha Re"	Manaswi Mohata	Karan Malhotra	Mika Singh	3:02
3.	"Le Sajna"	Tanishk Bagchi	Tanishk Bagchi	Altamash Faridi	2:15
4.	"Mann Mein Halchal"	Manaswi Mohata	Karan Malhotra	Akanksha Sethi	2:53
Total length:					11:16

== Release ==
Babli Bouncer was directly premiered on OTT platform Disney+ Hotstar on 23 September 2022.

== Reception ==
=== Critical response ===
The reception of Babli Bouncer has been mixed, with critics offering varying opinions on the film. While some reviewers praised aspects of the movie, others found it lacking in certain areas.

In an article from The Indian Express, the film was described as a feeble attempt at a feminist fable, despite Tamannaah Bhatia's sterling performance. The review highlighted the film's weak execution of its feminist themes and criticized its overall impact, giving it a rating of 1.5 stars. NDTV's review echoed the sentiment of a lacklustre execution, stating that the film's attempt at portraying female empowerment falls short. The review commended Tamannaah Bhatia's performance but criticized the film's weak narrative and awarded it 1.5 stars out of 5.

India Today's review criticized the film for excessive "wokeness," suggesting that an overemphasis on feminist messaging compromised the storytelling. The review highlighted that the film failed to strike a balance between its social messaging and engaging narrative, resulting in a less impactful viewing experience. The Hindu's review pointed out that Tamannaah Bhatia's talent was overshadowed by the constraints of a straitjacketed story. The review commented on the film's limited character development and predictable plot, ultimately concluding that it fell short of expectations. Contrasting these reviews, The Times of India offered a more positive take on the film. The review commended the film's engaging storyline, Tamannaah Bhatia's performance, and the blend of action and comedy. However, it also acknowledged certain flaws, such as uneven pacing and underdeveloped subplots.

In summary, the reception for Babli Bouncer has been mixed. While some reviewers appreciated elements such as Tamannaah Bhatia's performance and the film's storyline, others criticized its execution, character development, and thematic delivery.

== Accolades ==
Year	Award ceremony	Category	Nominee / work	Result	Ref.
2022	Filmfare Middle East Achiever's Night Awards	Best Director-Actor Duo	Madhur Bhandarkar, Tamannaah Bhatia	Won	
2023	Bollywood Festival Awards	Best Director (Note: Tied with India Lockdown)	Madhur Bhandarkar	Won	
2023	Filmfare OTT Awards	Best Web Original Film	Babli Bouncer	Nominated	
2023	Filmfare OTT Awards	Best Actress in a Web Original Film	Tamannaah Bhatia	Nominated	
2023	Filmfare OTT Awards	Best Story (Web Original Film)	Amit Joshi, Aradhana Sah, Madhur Bhandarkar, Shakeel Shafi Mohammed	Nominated	
2023	Filmfare OTT Awards	Best Original Screenplay (Web Original Film)	Amit Joshi, Aradhana Sah, Madhur Bhandarkar	Nominated	
