= Kabaad: The Coin =

- trailer poster
- Directed by: Varadraj Swami
- Written by: Shahzad Ahmed; Varadraj Swami
- Produced by: Babban Negi; Meena Negi
- Starring: Vivaan Shah; Zoya Afroz
- Cinematography: Hari Nair
- Edited by: Balajee Tiwari
- Music by: Sandesh Shandiya
- Production company: MBN Entertainment Pvt. Ltd.
- Release date: 17 May 2021
- Country: India
- Language: Hindi

Kabaad: The Coin is a 2021 Indian Hindi-language film, starring Vivaan Shah, Zoya Afroz and Atul Srivastav. The film is produced by Babban Negi and Meena Negi and directed by Varadraj Swami. Written by Shahzad Ahmed and Varadraj Swami, the film is scheduled to release on 17 May 2021 on the Over-the-top media service MX Player.

== Cast ==
- Vivaan Shah as Bandhan
- Zoya Afroz as Roma
- Atul Srivastav as Vaghmare
- Abhishek Bajaj as Sam
- Imran Hasnee as Badshah Khan
- Bhagwan Tiwari as inspector Lokhande
- Abhimanyu pandey as a police man
- Yashashri Masurkar as Savita
- Shahzad Ahmed as Gajni
