= Abir Goswami =

Indian actor (1975–2013)

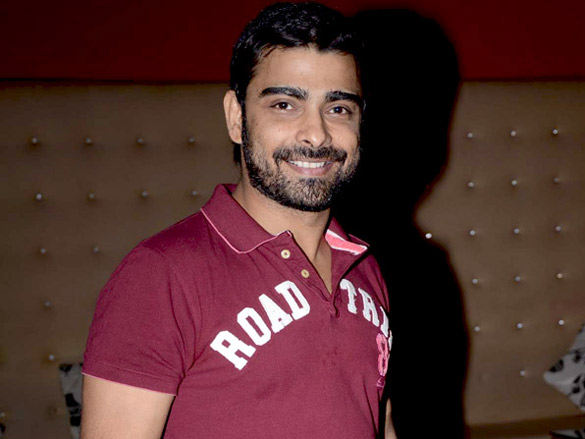
- Goswami at the launch of Ammaji Ki Galli
- Born: 21 April 1975; Kolkata, West Bengal, India
- Died: 31 May 2013 (aged 38); Mumbai, Maharashtra, India
- Occupation: Actor
- Years active: 2000–2013
- Spouse: Koyel Nath Goswami

Abir Goswami (21 April 1975 – 31 May 2013) was an Indian actor. He worked in television serials like Woh Rehne Waali Mehlon Ki, Pyaar Ka Dard Hai Meetha Meetha Pyaara Pyaara, etc.

== Television ==
| Year | Show | Role |
|---|---|---|
| 2000 | Aahat | Episode 258 & Episode 259 |
| 2001 | Kabhii Sautan Kabhii Sahelii | Ranjeet |
| 2001 | Kyunki Saas Bhi Kabhi Bahu Thi | Ajay |
| 2001–2002 | Kkusum | Sandeep "Sangu" Gujral |
| 2001 | C.I.D. – The Case of the No. 9112001: Part 1 & Part 2 | Rohan (Episode 189 & Episode 190) |
| 2001–2002 | Choti Maa – Ek Anokha Bandhan | |
| 2002 | Kammal | Satya Jajoo |
| 2002 | C.I.D. – The Case of the Dead Murderer: Part 1 & Part 2 | Raghav (Episode 231 & Episode 232) |
| 2002–2004 | Kittie Party | Prateek Sharma |
| 2003–2004 | Tum Bin Jaaoon Kahaan | Advocate Akash |
| 2004 | Bhabhi | Bhairav |
| 2004; 2005 | Kumkum – Ek Pyara Sa Bandhan | Asit Sengupta |
| 2004 | Raat Hone Ko Hai – 65 Crore Ke Liye | Aryan (Episode 133 – Episode 136) |
| 2004–2005 | Hotel Kingston | Sujeet |
| 2005 | Prratima | Malen |
| 2005 | Rooh | Akash (Episode 15) |
| 2005 | Sarrkkar – Risshton Ki Ankahi Kahani | Madan |
| 2005 | CID Special Bureau | |
| 2005–2006 | Yeh Dil Chahe More | Paramjeet Singh |
| 2006 | Kkavyanjali | Aarav Nanda |
| 2006 | Jabb Love Hua | Inspector Bali Shukla |
| 2007 | Ssshhhh...Phir Koi Hai – Daayan Bani Dulhan | Rashid (Episode 29) |
| 2007 | Ssshhhh...Phir Koi Hai – Ek Bhoot Ek Wakil Ek Shaitan | Advocate Amar Sharma (Episode 53) |
| 2007 | Ssshhhh...Phir Koi Hai – Gaadi Mat Rokna | Shreekant (Episode 57) |
| 2007–2009 | Sangam | Subodh |
| 2008–2009 | Main Teri Parchhain Hoon | Dheeraj Tyagi |
| 2009 | C.I.D. – Paheli Laash Ke Tukdon Ki | Laksh Kumar (Episode 574) |
| 2009–2010 | Jaane Pehchaane Se... Ye Ajnabbi | Avinash |
| 2010–2011 | Woh Rehne Waali Mehlon Ki | Akash Johri |
| 2011 | Adaalat – Qatil Murti | Amrit Nagpal (Episode 22) |
| 2011 | Dil Dostii Dance | Gautam Rai Prakash (Uncredited) |
| 2011 | Ammaji Ki Galli | Sardar Surjeet Singh |
| 2012 | Yahaaan Main Ghar Ghar Kheli | Sushant |
| 2012 | Ek Hazaaron Mein Meri Behna Hai | Rajeev Talwar |
| 2012 | Crime Patrol | Inspector Ajay Mehra (Episode 150 & Episode 151) |
| 2013 | Pyaar Ka Dard Hai Meetha Meetha Pyaara Pyaara | Kailash Gupta |
| 2013 | Ghar Aaja Pardesi | Advocate Madhav Mishra |
| 2013 | Crime Patrol | Inspector Pratap Juvekar (Episode 254) |

== Movies ==
- Khakee as Photographer
- Lakshya as Capt. Sudhir Mishra
- The Legend of Bhagat Singh as Phanindra Ghosh
- Sakkhat – a Bengali movie
- Bidhatar Lekha – a Bengali movie
- Zeher as Subhash Yadav/Fake Doctor
- Ugly
- Rocky as an undercover police officer (Bengali Movie)
- Darna Mana Hai as Vikas
- Ratparir Rupkatha – a Bengali movie
- Banobhumi – a Bengali movie

== Death ==
Goswami died on 31 May 2013 at the age of 38 due to cardiac arrest on a treadmill.
