= Papa Kahte Hain =

- Directed by: Mahesh Bhatt
- Written by: Manohar Shyam Joshi
- Produced by: Mahesh Bhatt; Amit Khanna
- Starring: Jugal Hansraj; Mayuri Kango; Anupam Kher
- Cinematography: Rajesh Joshi
- Edited by: Renu Saluja
- Music by: Rajesh Roshan
- Production company: Plus Films
- Release date: 17 May 1996
- Country: India
- Language: Hindi
- Budget: ₹10 million

Papa Kahte Hain (transl. Father says/Dad says) is a 1996 Indian Hindi romance film directed by Mahesh Bhatt. The film starred Jugal Hansraj and Mayuri Kango, with Tiku Talsania, Anupam Kher and Alok Nath in supporting roles.

== Plot ==
Sweety lives with her mother, maternal grandmother and grandfather. She is very rebellious, emotional and high-strung, and does not get along well with her classmates in school. All she knows is that she is not permitted to talk about her dad at home. She finds out that he is in the Seychelles and runs away there.

When she gets to the Seychelles, she can't find her dad, whom she has been so anxious to meet. One link is the death of marine archaeologist, Mr. Gandhibhai, who only knows where her dad is. Coincidentally, her dad is in the same hotel which she is in. He is living with another woman, Swati Sinha, who had divorced another man. Her dad is not at all thrilled to have a teenage daughter come and interrupt his life and affairs. In the Seychelles, Sweety meets Rohit Dixit and they fall in love with each other. Mr. Anand and Sweety have developed a father-daughter relationship, unaware to the fact that they are related. Later, the story has several twists, which ultimately ends on a happy note.

== Cast ==
- Jugal Hansraj as Rohit Dixit
- Dinesh Hingoo as Rustom
- Mayuri Kango as Sweety Anand
- Anupam Kher as Krishan Anand
- Navni Parihar as Vinita Gandhi /Anand
- Suhas Joshi as Mrs. Gandhi
- Soni Razdan as Swati Sinha
- Tiku Talsania as Taraknath Gandhi
- Suhasini Mulay
- Alok Nath
- Reema Lagoo

== Soundtrack ==
The music of this movie was huge hit, especially Ghar Se Nikalte Hi, Pyar Mein Hota Hai Kya Jaadu, Pehle Pyar Ka Pehla Gham. The music was composed by Rajesh Roshan. The lyrics were penned by Javed Akhtar. According to the Indian trade website Box Office India, with around 30,00,000 units sold the soundtrack became the second highest-selling album of the year after Raja Hindustani.

#	Title	Singer(s)
1.	"Ghar Se Nikalte Hi"	Udit Narayan
2.	"Pyar Mein Hota Hai"	Kumar Sanu, Alka Yagnik
3.	"Ye Jo Thode Se Hain Paise"	Kumar Sanu
4.	"Mujhse Naraaz Ho To"	Sonu Nigam
5.	"Pehle Pyar Ka"	Kavita Krishnamurthy
6.	"Hum Dulhan Wale"	Kumar Sanu, Poornima

Several songs are set in Hindustani ragas: "Ghar Se Nikalte Hi" (Yaman Kalyan), "Pyar Mein Hota Hai" (Yaman Kalyan) and "Mujhse Naraaz Ho To" ([[Chhayanat (raga)|Chhayanat]]).
