= Aandhi (TV series) =

Indian television series

- Created by: Siddhant Cinevision
- Directed by: Ramesh Saarang
- Starring: see below
- Opening theme: "Aandhi" by Mahalaxmi Iyer
- Country of origin: India
- Original language: Hindi
- No. of episodes: 76

Production
- Producer: Manish Goswami
- Running time: 24 minutes

Original release
- Network: Zee TV
- Release: 16 November 2003 – 3 March 2004

Aandhi is a Hindi television serial that aired on Zee TV in November 2003. The serial was produced by Manish Goswami. It was based on the concept of how a mistaken identity can bring ups and downs in one's relationships.

== Plot ==
The story is based on the life of a girl named Chandni, who gets mistaken for someone else. Chandni is in love with a boy of whom her father disapproves. She leaves home and then her life takes a new turn. A friend of hers who's a young widow dies unexpectedly, leaving her child in Chandni's custody. The friend's in-laws, who hadn't met her earlier, assume Chandni to be their daughter-in-law.

== Cast ==
- Simone Singh as Chandni
- Faisal Khan as Siddhanth
- Ayub Khan as Varun
- Kanika Kohli as Nisha
- Jyoti Mukherjee as Kanchan Singh
- Roma Bali as Pooja
- Vinay Jain as Captain Karan Singh
- Kiran Kumar as Diwan Singh
- Shilpa Shinde as Diya

Shilpa Shinde#

- Naresh Suri
- Rana Jung Bahadur
- Akshay Singh
- Seema Bhargava as Bua Ji
- Subhash Kapoor
- Ajay Trehan
- Nayan Bhatt as Siddhanth's Grandmother
- Shishir Sharma as Chandni's Father
- Rocky Verma as Raja - Underworld Shooter
