= Prratima =

- Genre: Drama
- Written by: Malhar Singh
- Directed by: Ashok Gaikwad, Santosh Bhatt
- Creative director: Raja Mukherji
- Starring: See below
- Theme music composer: Jatin–Lalit
- Opening theme: "Prratima" by Alka Yagnik
- Country of origin: India
- Original language: Hindi
- No. of seasons: 1
- No. of episodes: 174

Production
- Editors: Umesh Gupta; Vinay Malu
- Camera setup: Multi-camera
- Running time: Approx. 24 minutes

Original release
- Network: Sahara One
- Release: 23 August 2004 – 21 June 2005

Prratima is an Indian television series that aired on Sahara One channel in 2004. The series premiered on 23 August 2004. The series was produced by Rajaa Mukherji, the brother of Bollywood actress Rani Mukherji, and starred Kirron Kher in an important role. The story is based on the Bengali novel, "Protima", written by Tara Shankar Bandopadhyay. The series ended on 21 June 2005.

== Cast ==
- Jyoti Mukherjee as Prratima Ghosh / Prratima Amol Roy
- Anuj Saxena as Amol Roy (before plastic surgery)
- Vinay Jain as Amol Roy (after plastic surgery) / Venu
- Kirron Kher as Sunanda Sukumar Roy
- Vineeta Malik as Kaushalya Roy (Dadi Maa)
- Alka Kaushal as Asha Dharmesh Thakur
- Pawan Kumar as Atul Roy
- Ekta Sharma as Shivani Roy
- Rajeev Verma as Sukumar Roy
- Manasi Salvi as Prema Ghosh
- Shishir Sharma as Tapendu Ghosh
- Nitesh Pandey as Palash Ghosh
- Abir Goswami as Malen
- Dimple Inamdar as Simran
- Buddhaditya Mohanty as Nilesh
- Shama Deshpande as Sumitra Tapendu Ghosh
- Yatin Karyekar as Dharmesh Thakur
- Nigaar Khan as Anjali Thakur / Anjali Atul Roy
- Ashiesh Roy as Pundarik
- Sonia Singh as Anamika Roy
- Sudha Chandran as Alkalata Roy
- Sulbha Arya
- Jayant Saverkar
- Shashi Puri
- Sadhana Singh
