= Hogi Pyaar Ki Jeet =

1999 Indian film by P. Vasu

- Poster
- Directed by: P. Vasu
- Written by: Anwar Khan
- Story by: P. Vasu
- Produced by: Anil Sharma
- Starring: Ajay Devgn; Shabana Raza; Arshad Warsi
- Cinematography: Damodar Naidu
- Edited by: P. Mohanraj
- Music by: Anand–Milind
- Distributed by: Shweta International
- Release date: 7 May 1999
- Running time: 164 minutes
- Country: India
- Language: Hindi
- Box office: ₹155 million

Hogi Pyaar Ki Jeet (transl. Love will win) is a 1999 Indian Hindi-language romantic drama film directed by P. Vasu starring Ajay Devgn, Neha Bajpai, Arshad Warsi and Mayuri Kango.

== Synopsis ==
Surjit finds out that his sister is in love with Manjit Singh, the younger brother of Thakur Gajendra Singh. Surjit goes to Thakur's house in order to get Manjit to marry his sister. Thakur humiliates him; making him, a vegetarian, eat dog food and beg on his knees. Surjit does so and is told to go home and make wedding preparations. The next day, Thakur visits Surjit and kills him and his wife in broad daylight. Surjit's last dying wish is that his two sons Raju and Kishan must marry Thakur's and his brother's two daughters Meena and Preeti and they must have Thakur come begging on their doorstep for this marriage alliance. Surjit's sister agrees to this and accordingly brings up the two children. Unfortunately, Raju goes missing, leaving her alone to bring up Kishan. Years later they are reunited when Raju returns home and they join to fulfill Surjit's last wish. What they do not know is Meena and Preeti are to be married to Minister Khurana's two sons and nothing in the world is going to make Thakur change his mind.

== Cast ==
- Ajay Devgn as Raju
- Shabana Raza as Meena Singh
- Arshad Warsi as Kishan
- Prithvi Vazir as Thakur Manjit Singh
- Ketki Dave as Shalini
- Anil Dhawan as Surjeet
- Adi Irani as Diga Diga Khurana
- Mohan Joshi as Thakur Gajendra Singh
- Madhu Malhotra as Gajendra's wife
- Raza Murad as Minister Jagdish Khurana
- Hemant Pandey as Kishan's friend
- Rajesh Puri as Pandit
- Shiva Rindani as Dum Dum Khurana
- Shashi Sharma as Sharada, Surjeet's wife, Raju's and Kishan's mother
- Tiku Talsania as Truck Driver
- Mayoori Kango as Preeti Singh
- Firoz Khan as Arjun Singh

== Soundtrack ==
Hogi Pyaar Ki Jeet

Studio album by Anand–Milind
- Released: 1999
- Label: Tips Music

The soundtrack was composed by Anand–Milind with lyrics written by Sameer.

Title	Singer(s)	Length
"Tere Pyar Mein Main"	Roopkumar Rathod, Jaspinder Narula, Blaaze	04:15
"Dil Dewana Kehta Hai"	Udit Narayan	05:57
"Kaun Hai Woh"	Udit Narayan, Hema Sardesai	04:34
"Aa Gaye Din Sanam"	Abhijeet, Sonu Nigam, Hema Sardesai, Jaspinder Narula	04:55
"Lakhon Aashiq Mar Jaate Hai"	Udit Narayan, Alka Yagnik, Abhijeet, Jaspinder Narula	04:22
"Main Hoon Tere"	K.K, Anuradha Paudwal	04:45
"Karlo Karlo Mera Aitbaar"	Udit Narayan	04:32
"Taalon Mein Nainital"	Sonu Nigam, Alka Yagnik	04:48

== Reception ==
Suparn Verma of Rediff wrote, "Maybe, if your memory too was struck by the Chernobyl virus on April 26 and you lost all your recollection of old Hindi films, you'll certainly be charmed by the gags in this one."
