= Betaabi =

1997 film by Rajesh Kumar Singh

- Film poster
- Directed by: Rajesh Kumar Singh
- Screenplay by: Robin Bhatt; Akash Khurana
- Story by: Robin Bhatt; Akash Khurana
- Produced by: Paramjeet Baweja
- Starring: Arshad Warsi; Chandrachur Singh; Anjala Zaveri; Mayuri Kango
- Cinematography: Damodar Naidu
- Edited by: Kuldip K. Mehan
- Music by: Vishal Bhardwaj
- Production company: SP Pictures
- Release date: 5 September 1997 (India)
- Country: India
- Language: Hindi

Betaabi is a 1997 Indian Hindi-language action romance film directed by Rajesh Kumar Singh and produced by Paramjeet Baweja. It stars Arshad Warsi, Chandrachur Singh, Anjala Zaveri and Mayuri Kango in pivotal roles.

== Plot ==
Mr. Ajmera lives with his wife, Sumitra and daughter, Sheena. Sameer's father lives with his wife and son, Sameer. The fathers decided to have Sheena and Sameer marry each other when they come of age. Ajmera went on to get wealthy, and forgot about Sheena and Sameer's marriage, while Sameer's father died, leaving his widow and son to live in poverty. Years later Sameer has grown up and his mother wants him to marry Sheena much to the displeasure of Ajmera who wants her to marry his wealthy partner's son. Sheena, who loves challenges, asks Sameer to abduct her and take her to Gateway of India in Mumbai and it is then and only then will she marry him. Sameer agrees to this and both run away. Unknown to Sameer, Sheena has asked Shekhar to stop Sameer at any and all costs, unaware that Shekhar is not who he claims to be, and has a secret agenda of his own.

== Cast ==
- Arshad Warsi as Shekhar / Vicky
- Chandrachur Singh as Sameer Chandran
- Anjala Zaveri as Sheena Ajmera
- Mayuri Kango as Reshma
- Shakti Kapoor as Ajmera
- Gulshan Grover as Brij Gopal
- Rakesh Bedi as Peon at Dayal College and servant at Ajmera's house.
- Himani Shivpuri as Dayal College's Principal Radha
- Reema Lagoo as Sameer's mother
- Shadaab Khan as Shekhar Bohra
- Shama Deshpande as Mrs. Sumitra Ajmera

== Music ==
Betaabi

Soundtrack album by Vishal Bharadwaj
- Released: 27 July 1997
- Genre: Feature film soundtrack
- Label: Venus Records & Tapes

The music is composed by Vishal Bharadwaj. Where as lyrics were pen by Sameer, Dr. Basheer Badra and Vishal.

#	Title	Singer(s)
1	"Tum Mere Ho"	Suresh Wadkar, Lata Mangeshkar
2	"Gungunati Hui"	Kumar Sanu, Suresh Wadkar
3	"Tumhari Khushboo"	Suresh Wadkar, Asha Bhosle
4	"Tum Mere Ho" (Male)	Suresh Wadkar
5	"Tum Mere Ho" (Female)	Lata Mangeshkar
6	"Don't Take Panga"	Kavita Krishnamurthy
7	"Hay Hay"	Hariharan
