= Milan (Indian TV series) =

- Genre: Drama
- Directed by: Lekh Tandon
- Starring: See below
- Opening theme: "Milan" by Sukhwinder Singh
- Country of origin: India
- Original language: Hindi
- No. of seasons: 1
- No. of episodes: Total 58

Production
- Producer: Manish R Goswami
- Camera setup: Multi-camera
- Production company: Siddhant Cinevision

Original release
- Network: Sony TV
- Release: 2000 – 2001

Milan (transl. Meetup) is an Indian drama television series which aired on Sony TV, starring Rohit Roy and Nattasha Singh.

== Overview ==
The story revolves around the life of a girl, Chanchal who is caught between family ties and her love.

== Cast ==
- Mouli Ganguly
- Nattasha Singh as Chanchal
- Rohit Roy as Ranbir Kapoor
- Karan Oberoi (singer)
- Gauri Karnik
- Navin Nischol
- Arun Bali
- Nandita Puri
- Rana Jung Bahadur
- Amrit Pal
- Narayani Shastri
