= Neha Janpandit =

Indian television actress

- Born: Mumbai, India
- Occupation: Actress
- Years active: 2005–present
- Known for: Woh Rehne Waali Mehlon Ki

Neha Janpandit is an Indian television actress. She debuted on the small screen with Woh Rehne Waali Mehlon Ki on Sahara One. She also acted in Shraddha, Tere Liye, Chhajje Chhajje Ka Pyaar, Shubh Vivah, Rab Se Sohna Isshq and Humsafars. She also appeared in episodes of Star One Horror Nights, Nachle Ve with Saroj Khan, Adaalat, and Teri Meri Love Stories.

== Television ==
- Sahara One's Woh Rehne Waali Mehlon Ki as Dr. Raani Manav Kumar/Rishabh Rathore (debut role)
- Star Plus's Shraddha as Shraddha Swayam Khurana (lead role)
- Tere Liye as Nupur Basu (antagonist)
- Teri Meri Love Stories as Naina (episodic lead role)
- Sony TV's Chhajje Chhajje Ka Pyaar as Dimpy Dhruv Tripathi (lead role)
- Shubh Vivah as Saroj Nigam (lead role)
- Humsafars as Zeenat Chaudhary/Zeenat Sahir Mahajan (antagonist)
- Adaalat as Varsha (episodic lead role)
- Zee TV's Rab Se Sohna Isshq as Mallika (extended cameo role)
- STAR One's Star One Horror Nights (guest appearance)
- NDTV Imagine's Nachle Ve with Saroj Khan (guest appearance)

== Early life ==
Janpandit completed her studies at Smt. Sulochanadevi Singhania School, Maharashtra.
