= Dil Deke Dekho (TV series) =

- Screenplay by: Raghuvir Shekhawat; Dialogues : Raghuvir Shekhawat
- Story by: Raghuvir Shekhawat
- Creative director: Shefali Lal
- Country of origin: India
- Original language: Hindi
- No. of seasons: 1
- No. of episodes: 169

Production
- Executive producer: Siddhant Goswami
- Producer: Manish Goswami
- Production location: Mumbai
- Cinematography: Pankaj P. Kachhawa
- Editors: Ganga Kacharla; Amit Singh; Ankush Ambre; Ajay J. Batham
- Camera setup: Multi-camera
- Running time: 22 minutes
- Production company: Siddhant Cinevision Pvt. Ltd.

Original release
- Network: SAB TV
- Release: 18 October 2016 – 12 June 2017

Dil Deke Dekho (English : Look unto heart) is an Indian sitcom, which premiered on 18 October 2016 and ended on 12 June 2017 on SAB TV. This Hindi TV Serial was produced by Manish Goswami. It starred Anju Jadhav and Abhishek Bajaj in lead roles.

== Plot ==
This show highlights evolutionary love approach limiting to three generations by giving an example through two families, the Chopras and the Shastris.

== Cast ==
- Anju Jadhav as Preet Shastri
- Abhishek Bajaj as Rahul Shastri
- Preet Kaur Madhan as Simran Chopra, Rahul's aunt
- Amit Tandon as Kamal Chopra, Preet's uncle
- Navneet Nishan as Tulsi Chopra, Preet's grandmother
- Kanwaljit Singh as Hridayanath Shastri, Rahul's grandfather
- Jiten Lalwani as Sheri Chopra, Preet's father
- Jaswinder Gardner as Bubbly Chopra, Preet's mother
- Chetanya Adib as Atal Shastri, Rahul's father
- Ritu Vashisht as Mohini Shastri, Rahul's mother
- Nabeel Ahmed as Signal
