= Nattasha Singh =

Indian actress

- Born: Natasha Ajit Singh; 8 December 1980 (age 45)
- Occupation: Actress
- Years active: 1993–present
- Relatives: Tanya Singh (sister); Krishan Kumar (brother-in-law)

Nattasha Singh is an Indian actress who started her career as a child, in the sitcom serial Dekh Bhai Dekh. She played Kirti, the bubbly talkative emotional daughter of Navin Nischol and Farida Jalal. She also did some commercials for brands like Pepsodent, Khaitan and Polo

Following a four-year hiatus from acting, she made her acting comeback with music theatre and some music videos.

== Television career ==
Title	Role	Channel
Dekh Bhai Dekh	Kirti	DD Metro
Woh Hue Na Hamare	Arun Govil's daughter	DD National
Milan	Chancal	Sony TV
Aangan	Aarti	Zee TV
Oh Daddy!	Tina	Zee TV
Saat Phere: Saloni Ka Safar	Juhi	Zee TV
Kumkum – Ek Pyara Sa Bandhan	Malini (Malli) Malhotra	Star Plus

== Film career ==
Year	Title	Role	Language
2010	Mission 11 July	Raavi	Hindi
