= Jeetenge Hum =

2001 Bollywood film

Jeetenge Hum is a 2001 Bollywood action film featuring Arshad Warsi, Arbaaz Khan and Anjala Zaveri in the leading roles.
