= Kituu Sabb Jaantii Hai =

Indian sitcom series

- Directed by: Anshuman Singh; Puneet Gandhi
- Creative directors: Jitu Arora; Rajesh Ransinghe
- Starring: see below
- Opening theme: "Kituu Sabb Jaantii Hai" by Shreya Ghoshal
- Country of origin: India
- Original language: Hindi
- No. of episodes: 362

Production
- Producers: Manish Goswami; Sanjiv Goswami
- Running time: 25 minutes

Original release
- Network: Sahara One
- Release: 14 November 2005 – 6 April 2007

Kituu Sabb Jaantii Hai (transl. Kituu knows everything) is an Indian comedy-drama series that aired on Sahara One from 14 November 2005 until 6 April 2007. The show was based on the story of a middle class girl, Katyayani Purohit who fights her way out through a rather different path in an attempt to balance her family and professional life. The show was produced by Manish Goswami.

== Plot ==
The story is based on the life of a middle-class Indian girl, Kittu. Despite having dreams in her eyes, she dares to dream beyond the horizons of her little mohalla (colony). She faces life’s biggest challenges at the age of 20. When other girls are busy planning their husbands and their trousseaus, Kittu is forced to bring all her resourcefulness to the fore in saving her family from potential ruin and a lifetime of debt. Kittu's full name is Katyayani Purohit and she is a very smart girl. Her dream is to work in the news channel. However, her mom once decides that she won't work anywhere uttering women in the house will not work! Kittu's brother left the job and they even lost their shop, yet managed for money, Kittu agrees not to work but suggest her family somehow to earn money: her mother will work as a tailor at home itself and her sis-in-law will work as a teacher giving tuitions to all the villagers (children) who are lazy in Hindi ! In this way they earn some money.. But later Kittu's mother accepted her to work at the news channel. At work Kittu is always being harassed by some office workers (girl) and other. They trapped Kittu, but luckily Kittu always safe by the support of her friend. The boss of the news channel altered therefore Yuvraj makes his entry. He is too strict but later we see that Kittu rejects Rohan's love who is always behind her. Rohan keeps on following her all the time, before work and even after work but Kittu's mother dislikes this way of Kittu going to work at night and even Rohan calling at her residence or even talking to Kittu. Rohan belongs to the high class category people, so Rohan and hia family are rich. Kittu guessed Rohan to be rich at first sight but Rohan exchanged clothes with his friend who used to wear lil bit middle class clothes and sometimes he even used to buy middle garments sold on the road for Kittu to love him. He was deeply in mad with Kittu. He doesn't want to work in his office, always runs away from his business to be avoided by the girls from his office. Rohan's mom is the protagonist and she hates Kittu but helpless for his son. She takes the proposal of Kittu and Rohan's at Kittu's place and anyhow their proposal is granted. Kittu's mom is very happy her daughter is getting married in a very nice family but one day Rohan's mom sends a saree as a token through a driver at Kittu's place but when Kittu knows this, then she goes and returns the saree at Rohan's and says her mom that she doesn't like the design, then will give her designs to a tailor in her colony itself, belonging to low class. Thus, bidding farewell and left from there... Rohan is hurt but plans to take her up for dinner at night that day ! That day Yuvraj gave the responsibility of taking the interview of Munna Babu, the indecent politician to Kittu! Kittu made her researches before the interview but Yuvraj scolds her for not having enough information about Munna Babu's wife Mala. Kittu thought that she won't be given the chance for the interview but Yuvraj once he made the decision he does not change it, therefore Kittu goes for the interview with Jogi who plans to trap Kittu, the innocent.

Kittu is born to be successful, and with her determination she climbs up the corporate ladder and becomes a household name in the field of electronic journalism. And to pursue her fields of work, she even reject a lover, the scion of a millionaire family, on realizing that he fails to understand her when it comes to her profession. However, as the story moves on, Kittu falls in love with a guy from the news channel, Yuvraj. But, once successful in her field she is torn apart between Yuvraj, a divorcee with a child and Rohan, her ex-lover who comes back in her life after a failed marriage.

Kittu does an investigation concerning a stealth aircraft and Rohan gets trapped as the one who tried to bribe the officials. Kittu gets Rohan jailed. But then, it is revealed that Rohan is innocent and was trapped by Samaresh Gupta, the ex-lover of his mother, who is trying to take revenge from Rohan and his mother. Kittu does all her best to save Rohan and in the process, both get injured and end up in the hospital. On his part, Yuvraj gets irritated on seeing Kittu's concern for Rohan and her getting close to him, as he had earlier proposed Kittu to marry him. The truth is finally revealed and before the police can arrest Samaresh Gupta, he commits suicide.

NNN, which became a respectable and famous News Channel, soon finds itself under financial crisis. In order to save the company, Balraj Sir decides to lay off half of the staff and later even convince Yuvraj, Kittu and Daksha. However, Kittu although being employed since much shorter time than others, her job stays intact as she is considered to be one of the backbones of NNN. This is misinterpreted by staffs who claimed that she is given the chance due to her closeness to Yuvraj. Hearing all these, Kittu resigns from the job. As Rohan learns about Kittu's resignation and its reason, Rohan finances the Channel and becomes the boss.

The story takes a major twist when Nandini (Rohan's ex-wife) comes back after so long. She stops Kittu and Rohan wedding. She wants to talk to Rohan privately. She narrates that they have a baby girl and so on. Rohan stops the marriage and confesses to everyone that he has a little child. He did not want the child to be deprived of a father's love. So, Kittu broken-heartedly tells Rohan to marry Nandini and take care of the child (Pihu). Nandini wants to separate Rohan and Kittu. She does not want Kittu to come in between Rohan and Pihu. Rohan's mother wants to stops the marriage. Rohan still misses Kittu. He persuades her to marry him and not to Nandini. But, Kittu refuses and convinces Rohan to marry Nandini. Hence, Nandini is poisoning Neil's mind against Kittu. She is influencing Neil towards Kittu. Then, Neil started loving Kittu immensely. Kittu was burnt due to a tragic incident in a village. That happened when Kittu, the loyal girl, went to save a woman who was sitting next to her husband's pyre. The men there were in that conspiracy. The woman's little boy set fire in the pyre and Kittu went to save her which she was half burnt completely. The driver of Kittu phones Rohan and he told him to call the police. When the police arrive, they arrested the people their and both victims were taken to the hospitals. There, Ruhanika was also admitted. She has lost her child. Kittu's family were their when they learn the truth from Neil that Kittu was born. Ruhanika pleads for forgiveness with her husband and father-in-law. She realizes all her mistakes and ask for a last chance to prove to be a good daughter-in-law. Then, she meets Kittu and also asks her for forgiveness. Later on, Nandini comes and meets Kittu and also instigates Kittu's father for Neil and Kittu. When Rohan meets Kittu, her father ask him to stop meeting Kittu and let her daughter live in peace with Neil. Hearing this, Rohan was totally shattered and promise that he will not interfere in Kittu's life. Kittu's father tells her that Neil is a good boy and he will keep her happy. Kittu cries a lot thinking of Rohan. Her colleague, Prabhakar, came and meet her. Kittu narrates all the problems with him. Then, he opines Kittu that she should talk with Neil about this matter. At the same time Neil comes in the room. He confesses his love for Kittu and Kittu accepts to marry him. Rohan decides to do a court marriage with Nandini. On that day, Rohan receives a letter and a CD from a well-wisher. When he played the CD, Rohan and his mother were shocked to see that Nandini confessed all her crimes due to a drunkard situation in a party. She also mentions that she had trapped Rohan so easily with false DNA reports and so on. She also said that she does not love Rohan, but, loves his wealth. Seeing this, Rohan was full of rage and drags Nandini out the house. Rohan feels pity for Nandini's illegitimate child. She vowed to come back and make Rohan's life like hell. Sonia (Rohan's mother) informs Daksha that the marriage has been broken off. Then, Daksha informs everybody in NNN. Later on, Neil phones Daksha. She asks hin about the news, but, she asks Daksha not to tell this matter with Kittu. Then, Daksha prevents Kittu's colleagues to discuss Rohan's marriage with him. After a day Rohan decides to go to foreign. Sonia tries to stop him but in vain. On that day Kittu was marrying Neil. Rohan arrives there and gifted Kittu NNN with wishes best of luck. But Kittu stops the marriage and Kittu asked Rohan if he will marry her. Rohan accepts the proposal. On the way of returning Rohan was given a CD. Some men wanted the CD and chased Rohan. The ruffians capture Rohan. Rohan pretended to have lost his memory as he didn't want the ruffians to get the CD. Rohan was in the support of a girl named Julie. Rohan was declared dead. Kittu lived a simple life afterwards by handling NNN. After a month on a footage Rohan was appeared. Kittu left for Goa with support of Rohinika but not everyone supported Kittu. At Goa, Kittu met Rohan and got to know that Rohan is pretending to have a memory lost. Prabhakar arrives there to help Kittu. The ruffians learn the truth about Rohan. Julie dies while saving Rohan. Ruffians were after Kittu. Kittu escaped and went to airport. The police arrest the ruffians. Rohan, Kittu and Prabhakar were safe and sound in the city. Everyone learned Rohan is alive. Rohan and Kittu promise to do not marry until they do not find the illegal activities in the city. They acquire success in their mission. One day Kittu was nominated for an award. The whole NNN staff, Purohit family, Rohan and Sonia were there. Kittu, Prabhakar, Chandy and Rohan received awards. Rohan took Kittu with him to marry. Kittu and Rohan arrive at the award ceremony and everyone was surprised but later they understood. Kittu gets a phone call regarding a case, so Kittu's team left for the mission.

== Cast ==
- Ami Trivedi as Katyayani Purohit (Kittu)
- Tarun Khanna as Yuvraj
- Amit Varma as Rohan Kapoor
- Naresh Suri as Mr. Purohit (Kituu's father)
- Yash Sinha as Prabhakar
- Usha Bachani as Sonia Kapoor (Rohan's mother)
- Shama Deshpande as Mrs. Purohit (Kittu's mother)
- Harsh Khurana as Kshtij
- Sonal Pendse as Nandini
- Daya Shankar Pandey as Jogi
- Shubhavi Choksey as Sanwari
- Shital Thakkar as Kajal
- Amar Talwar as Balraj
- Samita Verekar as Shivani
- Salil Acharya as Indraneil (Neil) Banerjee
- Shweta Salve as Malaika Banerjee (Rohan's lover)
- Arzoo Govitrikar as Shweta (Rohan's lover)
- Praneet Bhat as Chandy
- Amandeep Soni
- Buddhaditya Mohanty
- Nasir Khan
- Benika Bisht as Daksha
- Dev Kantawala
- Charvi Sangkolkar
- Dolly Minhas as Amrit
- Kunal Bakshi
- Nisar Khan as Jagat

== Crossover ==
The lead character Rani from Woh Rehne Waali Mehlon Ki made a guest appearance during the launch episode of the series.
