= Aashirwad (TV series) =

- Created by: Siddhant Cinevision
- Directed by: Rakesh Sarang
- Starring: See below
- Opening theme: "Aashirwad"
- Country of origin: India
- Original language: Hindi
- No. of episodes: 161

Production
- Producer: Manish Goswami
- Running time: approximately 23 minutes

Original release
- Network: Zee TV
- Release: 19 June 1998 – 13 July 2001

Aashirwad is a Hindi television serial that aired on Zee TV from 19 June 1998 to 13 July 2001. The serial was based on story of two best friends who raise their children in different styles. The show was produced by Manish Goswami.

== Plot ==
The story is of two friends who raise their children in contrasting styles — one allowing them all possible liberties and the other keeping a strict hold on them. It explores a central theme of parenting — whether leniency in upbringing of children is justified or not — and traces the consequent pros and cons as the children mature into adults.

== Cast ==
- Govind Namdev as Purushottam Choudhary
- Shama Deshpande as Aparna Purushottam Choudhary
- Navin Nischol as Mr. Deshmukh
- Nasir Khan as Subhash Choudhary
- Poonam Narula as Amita Deshmukh
- Sanjeev Seth as Vijay Mansingha
- Anju Mahendru as Sumitra Devi
- Manasi Salvi as Preeti Choudhary / Preeti Vijay Mansingha
- Kavita Kapoor as Radha Deshmukh
- Randeep Singh as Radheyshyam Choudhary
- Sandhya Mridul as Geeta Radheyshyam Choudhary
- Bharat Kapoor as Mr. Choudhary
- Rajendra Gupta as Mr. Mittal
- Sonali Malhotra as Roma Mittal
- Nandita Puri as Vandana
- Hussain Kuwajerwala as Dinesh
- Smita Bansal as Vishakha
- Delnaaz Irani as Babli
- Sheetal Thakkar as Deepali
- Shishir Sharma
