= Kittie Party =

- The promotional logo image of "Kittie Party".
- Created by: Siddhant Cinevision
- Written by: Shobhaa De
- No. of episodes: 436

Production
- Producers: Manish R Goswami; Sanjiv Goswami

Original release
- Network: Zee TV
- Release: 19 August 2002 – August 2004

Kittie Party is a Hindi television serial based on women-centric theme that aired on Zee TV. The story is based on the lives of 8 women who get together in a function called 'Kittie Party' where they gossip, reveal their emotional and psychological self-expressions, and share secrets amidst friends.

== Concept ==
The story is based on the lives of eight women who get together in their social meeting ground called 'Kittie Party' every month to party and share their life moments with each other. The story goes through the lives of these eight women: Manju, Rewa, Vidya, Tina, Pixie, Niloufer, Kuku, and Natasha, and explores their individual lives through these meetings — their hopes, disappointments, aspirations, and longings. Each woman's character is reflected clearly through her interaction with others as well as through what she projects at these particular meetings.

The show brought the chic urban tribe of women and their sagas to the fore, with a progressive and often bold take on relationships.

== Cast ==
- Poonam Dhillon as Manju Manoviraj Saxena
- Maya Alagh as Vidya
- Preeti Dayal as Niloufer
- Deepshikha Nagpal as Kuku Nagpal
- Kavita Kapoor as Reva Manoviraj Saxena
- Shweta Salve as Tina Sudheer Sharma
- Achint Kaur as Pixie
- Kunickaa Sadanand as Vasundhara
- Vivek Mushran as Jay Sinha, Boss of Kuku
- Hitesh Kriplani as Vicky Saxena
- Kiran Kumar as Manoviraj Saxena
- Tony Mirchandani as Daboo
- Pankaj Berry as Ramakant, Manju's Brother in law
- Dolly Minhas as Manju's elder sister
- S M Zaheer as Mr. Sharma, Tina's Father in Law
- Rekha Rao as Maya Sharma, Tina's Mother in law
- Mohan Kapoor as Reva's Brother in law
- Raza Murad as Minister Ajeet Kumar
- Nasir Khan
- Siddharth Dhawan as Sudheer Sharma
- Abir Goswami as Prateek Sharma, Tina's Brother in law
- Khyaati Khandke Keswani as Aarti, Vidya's Daughter
- Jyoti Mukherjee
- Anupam Bhattacharya
- Vishal Sabnani
- Sunil Dhawan
- Rohit Roy
- Mayuri Kango as Riya, Ramakant's daughter
- Sonia Kapoor as Piya
- Nushrratt Bharuccha as Chiku
- Kanika Kohli
- Shabnam Kapoor
- Pyumori Mehta
- Mayank Tandon
- Tarun Khanna as Rajveer
- Rituraj Singh
- Shalini Kapoor Sagar as Dinky, Pixie's Friend
- Monaz Mevawala
- Indu Verma
- Roma Bali
- Romi Jaspal
- Zakir Hussain
- Sajid Khan
- Jeetendra Bharadwaj as Mr. Sinha
- Eva Grover
