= Amar Talwar =

Indian actor

- Born: 21 December 1949 (age 76); Jalandhar, East Punjab, India
- Occupation: Actor
- Years active: 1994–2015

Amar Talwar (born 21 December 1949) is an Indian artist and Bollywood actor. He appeared in the historic television series Shanti, in which he played Raj 'G.J.' Singh.

== Early life and career ==
Born to a Sikh family on 21 December 1949, Talwar was educated at the Lawrence School, Sanawar, along with his brother Rana Talwar.

Before becoming an actor Talwar worked as a photojournalist. He is originally from Chandigarh but moved to Delhi for work. He joined UNICEF as photo journalist for the Girl Child Division and also for the Ford Foundation, amongst others. Along with being a photo journalist he started stage acting. His appeared with Amitabh Bachchan in the movie Kabhi Khushi Kabhi Gham, where he portrayed Rani Mukerji's character's father.

== Filmography ==
Year	Film	Role	Notes
2001	Kabhi Khushi Kabhie Gham	Naina's father	Uncredited
2002	Bhavam	Thakker	Malayalam film
2002	Kabbarli	Naina's dad	English film
2003	Multi-task	Mahesh Ghodbole	Short
2003	Bhoot	Mr. Thakker	
2004	Deewaar	General Brar	
2005	The Film	Diamond Man Sharad Shah	
2006	Corporate	Anand Ruia	
2007	Partition	Khan	
2010	Mittal v/s Mittal	Karan's Father	
2015	Feast of Varanasi	CBI Asst Director Singh	
2015	Baby	Minister Pradhan	

=== Television ===
- 1994 - 1998 Shanti as Raj G.J. Singh
- 1998 Saaya (Indian TV series) - Mr Mehra, Tanya's father
- 1998 Rishtey - Do Boondein Chaand Ki - Episode 19
- 1998 Saturday Suspense as Mr. Kumar (Episode 75)
- 2001 - 2002 Jannat as Zaheer
- 2001 - 2003 Sarhadein
- 2003; 2005 - 2006 Kahiin to Hoga as Professor Sinha
- 2003 - 2006 Jassi Jaissi Koi Nahin as Purushottam Suri (Armaan's father)
- 2004 Raat Hone Ko Hai - Adhikar as Anil's father (Episode 13)
- 2005 - 2006 Kituu Sabb Jaantii Hai as Balraj
- 2006 Shararat as Ghost Colonel Pritam Pratap Singh
- 2007 Mad about Money
