= Chashme Baddoor (TV series) =

1998 Indian Hindi soap opera

- Written by: Rajesh Dubey
- Directed by: Sunil Salgia
- Starring: see below
- Country of origin: India
- Original language: Hindi
- No. of episodes: 62

Production
- Producer: Manish R Goswami
- Running time: approx. 24 minutes

Original release
- Network: Zee TV
- Release: 1998 – 1999

Chashme Baddoor is a Hindi language soap opera that aired on Zee TV channel in 1998. The series was produced by Manish Goswami. The story is based on the life of a woman who had a splendid teenage life and an equally contrasting middle age life and who does not know how to deal with it.

== Cast ==
- Sudha Chandran
- Naveen Bawa
- Ajay Nagrath
- Kashmera Shah
- Sadiya Siddiqui
- Rushali Arora
- Susheel Johari
- Moonmoon Banerjee as Shanta
- Jatin Kanakia as Chaturdas Chaurasia
- Anil Nagrath
