= Shraddha (TV series) =

- Created by: Ekta Kapoor
- Directed by: Pawan Sahu; Inder Das; Devashish Dhar
- Starring: Neha Janpandit; Barun Sobti
- Opening theme: "Shraddha" by Javed Ali and Pamela Jain
- Country of origin: India
- Original language: Hindi
- No. of episodes: 80

Production
- Producers: Manish Goswami; Ekta Kapoor; Shobha Kapoor
- Running time: Approx. 24 minutes
- Production companies: Siddhant Cinevision; Balaji Telefilms

Original release
- Network: StarPlus
- Release: 28 September 2009 – 15 January 2010

Shraddha is an Indian television series which aired on StarPlus. It is a tale about the Jaiswal family based in Ujjain. The show was produced by Manish Goswami and Ekta Kapoor.

== Plot ==
Shraddha is the story of a girl named Shraddha (Neha Janpandit) who resides in Ujjain with her family – parents, uncle, aunt, 2 older brothers and their wives. She has another brother who studies in Pune. Shraddha is going to marry Amit (Gaurav Wadhera) whom her parents have selected for her. Shraddha's aim in life is to fulfill her parents' dream of visiting the chaar dhaams (the four main places of holy pilgrimage for Hindus). Life seems good but Shraddha does not know that her second brother and her sisters-in-law, in fact, don't want the pilgrimage to materialize so they can save money.

Meanwhile, her uncle and aunt instigate her youngest brother Ashok to start a business of his own. They give him money but also steal it. Finally Shraddha's parents offer him their pilgrimage money. Shraddha gets upset and instead asks Amit for their wedding to be a simple affair. Amit and his parents agree and the money saved for Shraddha's wedding goes to Ashok. Meanwhile, the pilgrimage money gets stolen by her sisters-in-law. Shraddha requests Ashok to hand over his business money to his parents but Ashok runs away from home.

Shraddha asks Amit to postpone their wedding but this results in their engagement being called off altogether. She decides to move on but realizes that not only her second brother and her sisters-in-law, but also her uncle and aunt are greedy and only want the house and money for themselves. The only people she can trust are her parents and eldest brother, Santosh. She soon meets Swayam who says he is a photographer but actually wants to usurp their house to make a mall. He is the brother of Satya Sarkar who is in league with her uncle and aunt. In order to raise money, Shraddha accepts to work with him and they become good friends. Later his truth is exposed only after she gets the money. She is also accused of having an affair with him and is thrown out of the house. Her parents are very hurt and also leave house. They meet up with Shraddha in the temple and believe her. Together they go to stay with Pratima who is Shraddha's friend.

Now the focus shifts to Pratima's life and her own troubles. She cannot conceive which is why her husband misbehaves with her and is physically abusive. Pratima is actually married to Satya, Swayam's brother. Shraddha learns of Pratima's plight and emotionally supports her. Shraddha's family is looking for her parents to get some property papers signed by them. During this time her eldest brother Santosh realizes the truth and feels guilty. Meanwhile, Pratima learns of Satya and Swayam's search for Shraddha as they too want her signature for the mall as Shraddha is the sole owner of the land. When Pratima learns of this, she manages to send Shraddha away.

Swayam decides to marry Shraddha and then get her sign willingly. Pratima overhears this plan and warns her family. Satya breaks all ties with Pratima when he learns that she's been helping Shraddha. On the other hand, Swayam finds and says sorry to Shraddha, Shraddha refuses to forgive him but her parents agree. Swayam helps Shraddha's mother to recover her eyesight as she is blind and Shraddha forgives him. Then Swayam asks for Shraddha's hand in marriage. Everything goes alright until Swayam starts feeling guilty as he has fallen in love with Shraddha. Finally he reveals the truth and leaves. Shraddha is heartbroken.

Manoj (middle brother) finds Shraddha's parents, ask for forgiveness and takes them back home. Shraddha agrees to marry Raja who is actually a goon. Santosh does not want it but Namrata, his wife, convinces him that otherwise she would be married to Swayam who will make her pay forever and also they will later save her from Raja. Swayam learns of it and rushes to save Shraddha's life. Raja is jailed, Shraddha forgives Swayam, the family is repentant and finally Shraddha and Swayam marry and he reveals the truth he is impotent and not her. Satya accepts her as his wife and also asks for forgiveness.

== Cast ==
=== Main cast ===
- Neha Janpandit as Shraddha Swayam Khurana (née Jaiswal)
- Barun Sobti as Swayam Khurana

=== Recurring cast ===
- Mohammad Nazim as Satya Sarkar
- Neha Marda as Pratima Satya Sarkar
- Sudhir Dalvi as Jagdish Jaiswal
- Sukanya Kulkarni as Laxmi Jagdish Jaiswal
- Kashif Khan as Santosh Jaiswal
- Karuna Pandey as Namrata Santosh Jaiswal
- Siddharth Dhawan as Manoj Jaiswal
- Shashank Sethi as Ashok Jaiswal
- Dipika Kakar as Rama Manoj Jaiswal
- Deep Dhillon as Trilok Jaiswal
- Seema Pahwa as Gudiya Trilok Jaiswal
- Anup Soni as Ajay Khurana
- Sakshi Tanwar as Garima Ajay Khurana
- Sulabha Arya as Madhu Khurana, Swayam's grandmother
- Karan Wahi as Rohit Khurana, Swayam's youngest brother
- Karan Tacker as Amit Sarna
- Vineet Kumar as Raja

== Reception ==
Shraddha launched on 28 September 2009, day of Dussehra, as a daily soap broadcast on Star Plus; it aired Monday to Friday and occupied the 7 pm slot. The male lead, played by newcomer Barun Sobti, entered the show around two months after its launch.
