= Aisa Des Hai Mera (TV series) =

- Directed by: Lekh Tandon; Rajesh Sethi; Jitu Arora
- Opening theme: "Aisa Des Hai Mera" by Kunal Ganjawala
- Country of origin: India
- No. of seasons: 1
- No. of episodes: 139

Production
- Producer: Manish Goswami
- Running time: approx. 22 minutes

Original release
- Network: Sony Entertainment Television
- Release: 24 April – 21 December 2006

Aisa Des Hai Mera is a 2006 Indian television drama series that aired on Sony Entertainment Television India. The show was produced by Manish Goswami.

== Plot ==
The protagonist of the tale is a young woman named Rusty, who was born in England to upper middle-class white parents John and Linda. Living separate from her divorced mother and drunkard father, Rusty from her childhood starts having vague dreams about her being connected to India somehow. One day, she learns that she is a half-Indian and also that her mother, Linda had once been married to an Indian, Randheer Deol, a Sikh, and Rusty is their daughter.

After knowing the truth, Rusty decides to go to Punjab in search of her family. And fortunately she finds her family, but doesn't reveal the truth because she does not want to create a rift between her father and his wife, Mathura. But eventually Rusty's truth is revealed to the Deols. At first they don't accept her but Rusty manages to cling to their hearts. Although everyone falls in love with Rusty after a while, her stepmother Mathura still hates her and pretends to be nice to her, and wants to take avenge by throwing her out of the house. But as the story goes on, Rusty's life goes through many tribulations and at the end she manages to create love for herself in all of her family members, even her stepmother.

== Cast ==
- Saumya Tandon as Rusty Deol
- Kanwaljit Singh as Randheer Singh Deol (Rusty's father)
- Dolly Minhas as Mathura Randheer Singh Deol (Rusty's stepmother)
- Ranjeet as Ranveer Singh Deol (Rusty's grandfather)
- Beena Banerjee as Biji (Rusty's grandmother)
- Naresh Suri as Iqbal Deol (Randheer's elder brother)
- Mahru Sheikh as Iqbal's wife
- Soni Razdan as Linda (Rusty's real mother, uses her to attain Randheer's property)
- Suzanne Bernert as Young Linda
- Bharat Kapoor as Baldev Singh
- Manoj Bidwai as Andy Singh: Baldev's son who entraps Rusty in London because of his family's rivalry with Randheer's family
- Pawan Shankar as Ajit Singh Gill
- Gunjan Walia as Kandy Deol / Kandy Ajit Singh Gill
- Gaurav Chopra as Samay
- Benjamin Gilani as Madan Khurana (Randheer's childhood friend, Samay's stepfather)
- Krutika Desai Khan as Mohini Madan Khurana (Samay's stepmother)
- Ravee Gupta as Samay's stepsister
- Kiron Kher as Divya Malwa (Samay's real mother)
- Simple Kaul as Simi (Samay's real sister)
- Pavan Malhotra as Divya Malwa's second husband
- Vishal Kotian as Lucky
