= Rajeev Paul =

Indian television actor (born 1970)

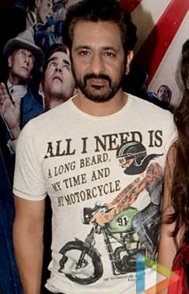
- Paul in 2019
- Born: 5 June 1970 (age 56); Ajmer, Rajasthan, India
- Occupations: Actor, writer
- Years active: 1995–present
- Spouse: Delnaaz Irani (m. 1998; div. 2012)

Rajeev Paul (born 5 June 1970) is an Indian actor who has acted in Hindi television serials.

== Career ==
Paul is an actor on Indian television and is known for the roles he has played in Swabhimaan, Kahani Ghar Ghar Kii and Nach Baliye. In 2012, Paul released a book of poetry called Hindi Mumbai Mohabbat Aur Tanhai.

He started his career as an actor on Mahesh Bhatt's television soap Swabhimaan. He has also worked with directors like Deepti Naval, and Bharat Rangachary. He has also competed on the dance reality show Nach Baliye, in which he participated with his ex-wife, Delnaaz Irani.

As a contestant in Bigg Boss 6, he was evicted from the house just before the grand finale after completing 96 days in the house.

== Television ==
Year	Serial	Role
1995	Rajani	Rakesh
1995–1996	Swabhimaan	Walter
1999	Yes Boss	Ravi Kumar Saxena
1999–2000	Abhimaan	Naresh Sehgal
2000–2001	Tanhaiyaan	
2000–2003	Rishtey	Kevin D'Souza
2002–2003	Aati Rahengi Baharein	
2004	Zameen Se Aassman Tak	
2002–2004	Kahaani Ghar Ghar Kii	Deven Garg
2005	Nach Baliye 1	Contestant
2005–2006	Saarrthi	Satpal Chaudhry
2006	Twinkle Beauty Parlour Lajpat Nagar	
2007	Meher	Shehzad
2009	Mere Ghar Aayi Ek Nanhi Pari	
2010	Ishaan: Sapno Ko Awaaz De	Shyla's Father
2012–13	Bigg Boss 6	Contestant
2017–2019	Jiji Maa	Jayant Rawat
2021–2023	Sasural Simar Ka 2	Giriraj Oswal

== Personal life ==
Paul met Delnaaz Irani, a television actress, on the set of Parivartan in 1993. The couple got married in 1998, separated in 2010 and were divorced in 2012.
