= Rishtey (TV series) =

Indian hindi television series

- Also known as: Rishtey - The Love Stories
- Created by: Zee TV
- Directed by: Girish Malik
- Country of origin: India
- Original language: Hindi
- No. of seasons: 1
- No. of episodes: 166

Production
- Running time: 1 hour

Original release
- Network: Zee TV
- Release: 1998 – 24 June 2001

Rishtey is an Indian television series that aired from 1998 to 2001 on Zee TV channel.

== Plot ==
It features small stories of human relationships. The show highlights the essence of life and brings to the forefront the various aspects of human relationships, such as husbands and wives, lovers, parents and children, friends and siblings. Each episode delves into the intricate lives of the characters, their circumstances and their deepest emotions.

== List of episodes ==
Episode	Name	Description	Telecast date	Main cast
1	Dooriyan...	Mike (Raj Zutshi) is in love with Veena (Arundhati), so he woos her and finally marries her. However, marriage does not prove to be a bed of roses as Mike and Veena find themselves to be incompatible. They have a little daughter named Tanya. Meanwhile, Mike meets Priya and they fall in love. Veena learns of their affair, and soon they separate, with Veena taking custody of Tanya. Priya too asks Mike to take a decision as she can share him with Tanya but not with Veena. Will Mike return to his family or to Priya? This episode is produced by Mrugesh and Akshay Mankad under Media Square.		Rajendranath Zutshi, Arundhati, Suchita Trivedi, Gazala Selmin
2	Aur Waqt Tham Gaya	Rashmi does not believe in love until she reads a notification in a newspaper of an aged Captain Anand (Alok Nath) asking his love Urmi to meet him just once before dying. The ad raises Rashmi's curiosity and she goes to meet Anand, where he narrates about his love, Urmi. Anand and Urmi had loved each other very much. However, one day when Anand goes to meet Urmi, her mother tells him that she will marry someone else. But an old Anand still fosters a hope to meet his love just one more time. Will his hope turn into a reality, fifty years later? This episode is produced by Suchitra, Anand and Ravi Raisinghani under Suchitra Home Entertainment.		Usha Bannerji, Alok Nath, Masumi, Rajeev Paul, Rushali Arora, Aman Verma as Aashish, Meena Naik, Anita Kanwal, Raju Samtani, Ajay Nagrath
3	Halki si dhoop	Mansi and Sandeep have been married for five years but in these years they have fallen apart as Sandeep is totally obsessed with his work and success. Then enters Arvind (Madhavan) in Mansi's life, and an initial attraction blooms into love for Arvind. But what about Mansi? Being married, will she be able to reciprocate? This episode is produced by Rajesh Pradhan, Sanjay Datta, Sujata Sengupta and Madhuri Bajpai under Group 2 Films.		Iravati Harshe, R.Madhavan, Sanjay Singh, Mandeep, Rahul Khanna
4	Kinara	Kinara Laxmi (Seema Bhargav) and her husband (Benjamin Gilani) have been looking after Raju from the time she was orphaned as a baby after Benjamin's sister's death. Raju has been left behind a huge inheritance. Now grown up, their son, Venky (Deepraj Rana), wants to pursue an MBA degree from a US university but lacks the funds. His father suggests that despite not loving Raju (Natasha Rana), he should marry her as all her wealth would become his and he could then go to the US. And thus, after getting married, Venky leaves for further studies. Will Venky remain committed to his marriage, once he reaches the US? Or has he just used Raju for his selfish interests? This episode is produced by Manju Asrani and Sushil Bhatnagar under V3tv (Vision 3 Television).		Natasha Rana, Deepraj Rana, Seema Pahwa, Miral, Gargi, Benjamin Gilani
5	Pahli Nazar Main	Raji is travelling in a bus when Ankit sees her for the first time and falls in love with her instantly. On learning that she is blind, he promises to have her eyesight restored. However, Raji is in love with Nilesh but at his mother's behest, cuts off all ties with her after she turns blind. Is Ankit going to keep his promise and have Raji's eyesight restored? And will Raji eventually reciprocate Ankit's feelings? This episode is produced and directed by Ravi Kemmu under Martand Movies.		Sudesh Mahan, Abha Dhulia, Joy Sengupta, Shruti Ulfat, Randeep Singh, Kiran Bhargava
6	Chupke Chupke	Shekhar has left the custody of his three children to their governess, Ms. Komal, who is a very stern lady and an absolute disciplinarian. Their neighbour, Rohini (Rohini Hattangadi) tries to befriend the children but is turned away by both Shekhar and Ms. Komal. With her friend, Madhuri's help, Rohini plans a way to get both Shekhar and Ms. Komal out of the way so that she can be friends with the children. But for how long with this charade last? This episode is produced by Saurabh Sengupta and Sanjay Chandna under Puji Zubi Combine.		Seema Shetty, Rohit Sehgal, Deepan Vartak, Amit Behl, Sharad Kapoor (guest appearance), Kanika Shivpuri, Harjeet Walia, Prithvi Zutshi
7	Mere Apne	When Aditya (Raju Kher) declares to his young children that he wants to remarry, they are furious. However, despite their resistance, he goes ahead and marries Shraddha (Mandira Bedi). Shraddha is confident about winning over the children's hearts sooner or later, so she puts up with their tantrums. Aditya is disheartened but Shraddha assures him that all will be well. Will the children ever accept Shraddha, or will they compel her to leave her new home? This episode is produced by Dinesh Bansal under Meteor Films.		Raju Kher, Mandira Bedi, Prachi Singh, Mulraj Rajda, Jay Devi, Rohit
8	Mujhe Mat Yaad Karna	Jai Saxena is a flourishing businessman, and during a company takeover, he meets Sunanda (Kitu Gidwani). Dissatisfied with his wife Savitri (Zarina Wahab) and children, Jai finds himself drawn to Sunanda. Their relationship gradually turns to love. Disgusted at this, Jai's son, Rohit, goes to kill Sunanda, but she explains her side of the story, and he softens his stand towards her. Meanwhile, Jai dies and his brother Hansraj takes over all of Jai's wealth and property. What will happen to Jai's family? Who will come to their rescue now? This episode is produced by Kamlesh Pandey under Roots & Wings.		Zarina Wahab, Kitu Gidwani, Utkarsh Mazumdar, Rakesh Paul, Sharad Smart, Anita Thakur, Shailendra Srivastava
9	Pal Do Pal]	After her grandmother, Priya's death, Shweta goes to her room and looks at her mementos, where she sees a letter from Vikram (Pavan Malhotra) on the photograph of a house. An abode called Priyashiana which was Vikram's dream house. Priya, an already married woman when she met Vikram, ends up sharing a special bond with him. A short time shared together but imprinted in their lives forever. Shweta's curiosity gets her to Vikram's Priyashiana. Does Vikram's dream house turn a reality now? This episode is also produced by Group 2 Films.		Pavan Malhotra, Mrinal Kulkarni, Charmee Shah, Yash Tonk
10	Yooheen Kaheen	Shalu (Pallavi Joshi) is in desperate need of a job, so she lies about being a nurse to tend to Vikas (Rajesh Khera), a leukaemia patient. But Vikas' pain and agony is beyond Shalu, so she decides to quit her job. However, Vikas convinces her otherwise. Shalu brings sunshine into Vikas's life. But one day in a discothèque, Vikas collapses. Consumed with guilt, she leaves his house. Will Shalu ever be able to forgive herself? Will Vikas survive his illness? This episode is produced by Satyen Kappu under Kappu Arts.		Pallavi Joshi, Rajesh Khera
11	Karan	Thakur (Lalit Parimoo), despite being a married man, is a womaniser and showers his affection on Meenabai, a courtesan and his lover. His wife tries everything to lure her man but of no avail. Karan Singh, the younger brother of Thakur's friend gets employed in the mansion as a helper. Feelings of sympathy for Thakur's wife turn to love but she has her eyes only for Thakur. To keep her happy, Karan tries his best to convince Thakur not to go to Meenabai. Will he eventually succeed, or will things take a turn for the worse? This episode is also produced by Meteor Films.		Lalit Parimoo, Dimple Ghosh, Sajni Hanspal, Anil Sinha, Aresh
12	Ajnabee	Aman (Rohit Roy) is an artist by profession. One day, while painting, Nidhi (Achint Kaur) catches his eye and he makes many sketches of her. Nidhi is in the process of getting her divorce, and finds a good friend in Aman. After getting a divorce, Nidhi leaves for the US. Will she return to Aman? This episode is produced by G.D. Arora under G. Arora Films and NAT.		Rohit Roy, Achint Kaur
13	Hansa	Hansa (Sushma Prakash) has been married to Gautam (Denzil Smith) for seven years, and has a son Rahul. Gautam has given her everything, yet she finds something amiss in life. In a chance encounter, she meets Adi (Arjun Raina) and is attracted to him. A question asked by Rahul whether Adi is better than his father, Gautam, leaves Hansa thinking. And only she can answer this question. This episode is produced and directed by Parvati Balagopalan under Parvati Pictures.		Sushma Prakash, Arjun Raina, Denzil Smith, Kanwar Katar
14	Ae Mote...	Sachin Pandey (Saurabh Shukla) is in love with his office receptionist Sandhya but has never been able to muster the courage to express his feelings for her as he is extremely conscious of being overweight. There are times when Sandhya's words and actions make him believe that even she feels strongly about him but he cannot get himself to ask her. Is Sachin going to confess his love for her someday, or will it remain unexpressed? This episode is also produced by Media Square by the Mankad brothers.		Saurabh Shukla, Shilpa Tulaskar, Atul Parchure, Swati Chande, Kanti Madiya
15	Zindagi	Vikram Godbole (Vikram Gokhale) and his wife Leena (Reema Lagoo) are always at loggerheads despite being married for 35 years. Their elder son, Ravi, gets a transfer and moves out of their home with his family because his work place is far away. As the grandchildren need to be looked after, Vikram stays back with their younger son, Kiran and his family, while Leena goes away with Ravi. After initial joy at their new found freedom, Vikram and Leena now yearn for each other. What will they do to rekindle the lost romance? This episode is produced by Rajeev Tandon under RT Entertainment.		Vikram Gokhale, Reema Lagoo, Yogesh Joshi, Sachit Patil, Jayati, Priyadarshini
16	Mehmaan	Shankar (Alok Nath) cannot father a child as he is infertile but he never discloses this to his wife Mano. Kishan, a young botanist, comes to their house seeking refuge on a rainy night. But sensing Kishan's goodness, Shankar allows him to stay in his house for as long as he wants. One day, Mano confides to Shankar how devastated she is at being barren. Shankar feels very guilty about this, so what does he do to alleviate this feeling? This episode is also produced by Meteor Films.		Alok Nath, Sukanya Kulkarni Mone, Mansi, Savi Sidhu, Paresh Sinha, Anupam Shyam, Rithvika Dey, Vishal Singh
17	Tumhare liye	Captain Rahul Khanna (Harsh Chhaya) is married to Pooja (Irawati), and they now long for a baby. But their fertility report shows that Rahul cannot father a child. However, knowing that Rahul will be devastated with the finding, she puts the blame on herself. A loving husband once, Rahul now distances himself from Pooja. Will Rahul's behaviour put an end to their marriage? This episode is produced by Rajiv Mehta under Final Take Films.		Harsh Chhaya, Iravati Harshe, Jyotsna Karyekar
18	Gunjan	Pandey(Manohar Singh) refuses to accept his daughter Ritu and grandchild Gunjan (Baby Gazala) when they come to live with him after Ritu's husband files for a divorce. He hates Gunjan as she reminds him of Ritu's husband, a man he had always disliked, and whom he cannot forgive for destroying his daughter's life. But will little Gunjan win over his heart with her innocent ways? This episode is produced and directed by Ajay Kartik under Karma Television.		Manohar Singh, Rita Bhaduri, Harsh Chhaya, Reshma Polekar, Masood Akhtar, Master Ajaz, Gazala Selmin
19	Do Boondein Chaand ki	Deepika (Shilpa Tulaskar) is pregnant with Naveen's (Waqar Shaikh) baby. She is delighted as Naveen simply loves children but their dream is short-lived as Deepika has to have her uterus removed. Looking at Naveen after this always makes Deepika sad, so she decides to go to her father's house for a few days. She learns there that her younger sister Roshni (Gautami Gadgil) is pregnant. How does Deepika react to this? Will Deepika and Naveen come close again? This episode is produced by Adib Contructor and Tarun Chopra under Picasso.		Shilpa Tulaskar, Vaquar Shaikh, Gautami Kapoor, Amar Talwar, Omung Kumar (special appearance)
20	Likhe Jo Khat Tujhe]	Raju (Nasirr Khan) has no time for love as he is too engrossed in his studies. But one look at Parul (Mouli Ganguly) changes all the rules for him as he falls head over heels in love with her. However, he lacks the courage to confess his feelings to her. To his rescue comes his author friend, Som, who advises him to write letters to her, and agrees to be the mediator between them. Is Raju going to win over Parul's heart, or does Som have some other plan? This episode is also produced by Martand Movies.		Nasirr Khan, Joy Sengupta, Mouli Ganguly, Atul Shrivastav, Vrajesh Hirjee, Amit Mistry, Samta, N. Paadhy
21	Bandhan Kachhey Dhaagon Ka	Amar and Prem (Amita Behl and Ravi Gosain, respectively) are two childhood friends who find odd jobs to do to survive. On the other hand, Dayashankar (Pankaj Dheer) uses his younger sister, Munni (Bhairavi Raichura), to get money for him. Daani Seth (Paintal) is a money lender whom Amar, Prem and Munni go to when in need. One day, Dayashankar comes and takes away all the money which Munni has made in her business. How is she going to repay Daani Seth now? Will Amar and Prem come to her rescue? This episode is produced by Amitabh and Rahul Sinha under Vision Channel India.		Pankaj Dheer, Amit Behl, Ravi Gossain, Bhairavi Raichura, Guest appearances: Paintal, Deepak Sinha, Rajendra Chawla, Murali Sharma, Ritu Narula, Raj Kiran
22	Nai Buniyad	Tripathi (Naveen Nischol) is born during India's independence struggle, and is an extremely righteous man. And these principles become the root cause of all fights at home between him and his two sons. Eventually, his elder son's alcohol addiction compels him to apply for a government house using deceitful means as both the sons need money. But guilt overwhelms him. Is Tripathi going to be able to put with this guilt for the rest of his life? This episode is also produced by Ajay Kartik's Karma Television.		Navin Nischol, Uttara Baokar, Uday Nene, Lalit Parimoo, Narendra Gupta, Naresh Suri, Aman Verma, Moon Moon Sen, Poonam Jha, Pratibha Sharma
23	Aur Aasman Jhuk Gaya	Nisha (Anchit Kaur) and Rahul have a baby girl named Pinky. As they are a working couple, they have a maid to look after her. But one day when Pinky falls ill, Nisha refuses to come home as she has an important party to attend. Furious with her callous attitude, Rahul slaps Nisha. She cannot forgive him for this and they get divorced. Pinky is now in the care of Asha, a neighbour of Rahul's parents. Rahul and Asha marry. But years later, Nisha decides to fight for Pinky's custody in court. Will the verdict go in her favour? This episode is produced in-house by Zee TV itself.		Achint Kaur, Vaquar Sheikh, Anita Kulkarni, Madan Joshi, Baby Lekhni
24	Uphaar	Ridhi has been blind from six months, and Gitika is her best friend. Always together, Gitika asks Ridhi what she wants as a birthday gift, and she says she would like to have eyes. Gitika is adamant about getting Ridhi's gift for her. Will she be able to do so? Will Ridhi be able to see the world? This episode is produced by Karuna Samtani under Pratham Media Entertainment.		Abhimanyu Singh, Natasha, Zoya Khan, Gargi Vegiraju
25	Ek Anokha Rishta	Vikas sees a winner in Deepak, Vishaka's son, and coaches him to be a table tennis champion. Initially, Vishika is reluctant to let Deepak play as she had lost her husband, yet another sports lover, but after Vikas's persistence, she relents. Vikas begins grooming Deepak, and the big day arrives. Will Vikas be able to realise his dream through Deepak? This episode is produced by Kapil Kumar under Imaginatio.		Pavan Malhotra, Arundati, Dharmesh Tiwari, Anand Nagarketti
26	Ek Nishwas	Shahji (Benjamin Gilani) is married to (Shahiji) Neena Gupta but she has not been able to bear any children. Desperate to give her husband an heir, Shahiji gets him married to Choti (Gautami Gadgil), so that she can bear him a son and his family name will carried down to the next generation. Is this gamble going to pay for Shahiji? This episode is also produced by Manju Asrani and Sushil Bhatnagar's India Vision International (IVI), the V3tv's sister company.		Benjamin Gilani, Neena Gupta, Gautami Kapoor,
27	Tu hi Tu	Vicky is an architect and loves flirting with all the girls, including Sapna, who works with him and loves him. But he falls madly in love with Anamika, a girl he sees in a restaurant. Is he going to muster the courage to confess his feelings for her? Or is a surprise in store for him? This episode is produced and directed by Girish Malik under Clap-Stem.		Joy Sengupta, Tony Mirrcandani, Amrita Raichand, Eva Grover
28	Chaaya	Jona (Sulabha Desphande) is the caretaker of her relative John's bungalow. John lives in Canada with his wife and has promised Jona that he will take her back with him. Jona has two paying guests, Rohit and Vijay, living with her but they are forced to vacate the house once John arrives as he wants to sell the house to a builder. But what about Jona? Will John take her back to Canada or will she be left all alone to fend for herself? This episode is produced by Aditya Bhamra's Wild & Wacky Entertainment and Shyam Jeet Gupta's Vijayshyam Inc.		Sulabha Deshpande, Sanjay Mehandiratta, Anupam Bhattacharya, Rohini, Ritesh Sinha, Shweta, Deepak, Ramesh Gohil, Alan Mans
29	Suhaagan	Gangaprasad worships his father, Shivnath (Satyen Kappu) and marries Laxmi, only on one condition that she stays with his father and tends to him well after marriage. Ganga leaves for the city for work but keeps visiting his wife and father often. On one occasion when Laxmi also accompanies him to the city, fate plays an evil trick. What happens to Ganga and Laxmi? This episode is also produced by Meteor Films.		Shruti Ulfat, Girish Mallik, Deepak Sinha, Satyen Kappu, Asha Sharma, Jaidevi, Raj Joshi
30	Mr & Mrs... "Divorce"	Vinod Verma and Revathy (Renuka Shahane) have been happily married but gradually, they start fighting. One day, Revathy walks out of the house in a huff. They file for a divorce and the court gives them a separation period of one year to reconcile their differences. Revathy gets a job as a secretary of Vinod's client. Professional circumstances throw them together this time. Are Vinod and Revathy going to give their marriage a second chance? This episode is also produced by Saurabh Sengupta and Sanjay Chandna's Puji Zubi Combine.		Pavan Malhotra, Renuka Shahane, Achyut Potdar, Bharati Achrekar, Abhay Bhargava, Ajay Wadhavkar, Raj Tilak, Ajit Mehra
31	Aarambh	Ravi Mahajan (Jayant Kriplani) and Anita (Divya Seth) get a surprise when all of a sudden, Sonia (Rajeshwari Sachdev) turns up at their doorstep. Sonia is Ravi's daughter from his first marriage and has come to him as her mother is dead and she has no money. Bitterness rents the air between Ravi and Sonia. Are the father-daughter ever going to reconcile their differences? This episode is produced by Rajit Kapur and Deep Dudani under Saaransh.		Jayant Kripalani, Divya Seth, Rajeshwari Sachdev
32	Taqraar	Seema (Shefali Chaya) and Abhinav (Parmeet Sethi) meet in the most unpleasant circumstance. However, Abhinav, prodded by his little daughter, Kajol, asks him to call Seema and apologise for his behaviour. But Seema is not willing to forgive him. Eventually, she realises that Abhinav is genuine and peace prevails between them. Soon, Kajol and Seema's son Mukund become thick friends. Abhinav asks Seema to be with him forever. Will she accept his proposal, or will her past wounds stop her from doing so? This episode is produced and directed by Vinta Nanda and Raman Kumar under Tracinema.		Parmeet Sethi, Shefali Shah, Bimal Oberoi, Dev Trivedi, Miral, Bhakti Kulkarni
33	Aagosh	Amar is a very successful author who writes about prisoners facing death penalty. The thirst for fame and success even makes him distort stories. All this changes when he meets Pareen (Renuka Shahane) who has been sentenced to death for killing her mother. He tries to gather all the information from her for his book but she remains silent initially. Gradually, the ice is broken and love blossoms between them. Pareen finally confesses that she killed her mother to set her free from her evil father's constant misdeeds. Will Amar be able to seek pardon for Pareen now? This episode is produced by Lalit Modi under Modi Entertainment, later renamed Modi Entertainment Network (MEN).		Renuka Shahane, Krishan Kant Singha, Mandeep Bhander, Rajesh Khera, Pratima Kazmi
34	Yoon Hee Chhoo Liya	Parul (Grusha Kapoor) is a prostitute and operates at night from a flat opposite KP's (Mahesh Thakur) flat. Being a righteous man, KP complains about her activity to the building secretary and she is thrown out. Furious, she stays back in KP's flat and refuses to leave till he arranges for another flat for her. Deriving inspiration from this anecdote, KP writes an article for his magazine along the same lines and turns it into a love story. But will love story bloom even in reality? This episode is produced by Seema Kapoor's S.K. Media.		Mahesh Thakur, Grusha Kapoor, Virendra Saxena, Arun Verma, Rakesh Bidua, Mona Parekh
35	Ankur	Anu (Divya Seth) and Rishabh (Jayant Kriplani) are having an affair, and though he wants to marry her, she refuses because of her earlier bad marriage. A street urchin named Ghanti who sells flowers catches her attention. He begins to run small errands for the money she gives him. After frequent interaction with Ghanti, Anu realises that she needs to change her perspective and priorities in life. Is she going to give Ghanti a better life? This episode is also produced by Rajit Kapur and Deep Dudani's Saaransh		Ankur, Karan Trivedi, Divya Seth, Jayant Kripalani, Loveleen Mishra
36	Dashrath ka Vanwaas	Babun (Anup Soni) always longed for the love of his father Suraj (Mohan Joshi) but Suraj only inflicted miseries on him. Fed up with his father's atrocities, Babun goes to live with his paternal uncle, Ishwar (Benjamin Gilani). Suraj is now old and ailing. Ishwar keeps pleading Babun to go and meet his father just once. However, painful memories of his childhood keep haunting Babun and he never relents. Even his wife Sudha (Gautami Gadgil) is not able to convince him. One day, Ishwar phones Babun to inform him that his father has had a heart attack. Will Babun have a change of heart at least now? Will he be willing to forgive and forget? This episode is also produced by Manju Asrani and Sushil Bhatnagar's V3tv		Mohan Joshi, Benjamin Gilani, Anup Soni, Gautami Kapoor, Miral
37	Anjali	Anjali (Urvashi Dholakia) works in a discothèque as a singer and looks after her parents and younger brother. Gautam, who is a drummer in the same place, loves her but she loves Michael. Like her parents, even Michael uses her for her money. One day, she finds out that Michael is already a married man with a child. The betrayal shatters her completely. What devastates her further is that her father was aware of it. Is this the end of all her dreams? Will she ever find a man who will love her? This episode is also produced by Karma Television.		Urvashi Dholakia, Narendra Gupta, Sanjeev Seth, Rajesh Khera, Hansa, Prithvi Zutshi, Rakesh Paul, Kanika Shivpuri
38	Tafteesh			Tinnu Anand, Vishal Singh, Abha Dhulia
39	Maa	Mother (Sulbha Deshpande) has never come to terms with life even 4 years after seeing her son, Kundan, die in her arms. Kundan was shot dead by the dreaded terrorist Rashid Gul (Aditya Srivastav) because he was going to inform the police about Rashid. Mother watches a news flash that Rashid has escaped from prison and is on the run. She recognises Rashid as her son's killer and is shocked to see him seeking refuge in her own house. Threatened at gunpoint by him, mother has no choice but to lie when the police come to her house asking for him. Rashid suffers from malaria and mother and her daughter, Usha, tend to him day and night. Mother cannot get herself to hate the man who killed her son, and soon, there emerges a mother-son bond between Rashid and her. Mother asks Rashid to surrender to the police so that he stops leading the life of a fugitive. Will Rashid heed her or will he escape? This episode is also produced by Meteor Films.		Sulabha Deshpande, Aditya Srivastava, Lalitesh Jha, Shweta Rastogi, Manoj Mishra, Raju Singh
40	Prayischit	Rahul is a struggling actor and in a party, he meets Divya Dalal (Moon Moon Sen), a very influential elder lady. An intimate bond develops between them, and Divya manages to get Rahul a much needed break as a film actor. While he shoots, he meets a journalist, Sapna, and they fall in love. Rahul returns to confess to Divya that there is another woman in his life. When he shows her Sapna s photograph, Divya is terribly shocked. Who is Sapna, and what is her relationship with Divya? This episode is produced by Anu and Shashi Ranjan under Anushka Images.		Moon Moon Sen, Rohit Sehgal, Shruti Ulfat
41	Iss Saal...	Edward (Saurabh Shukla) has just lost his wife Margaret and is very lonely before Christmas. He had lost his son, Peter earlier, and his daughter Barbara lives out of the country with her family. Deciding not to be alone, he gets two orphaned siblings, Cynthia and Steven home to celebrate Christmas. But having been abandoned at such a young age, Cynthia has turned into a very difficult child. All Edward wants to do is love the children, but will they reciprocate his feelings? Will Edward also get a Christmas gift which he so much desires? This episode is produced by Kiran Bhatia's Flying Colors.		Saurabh Shukla, Amardeep Jha, Gazala Selmin, Ashiesh Roy, Preeti Koppikar, Master Shahnawaz
42	Saal Mubarak	Both Joy and Jyoti (Sangeeta Ghosh) are engaged to their respective partners, but a meeting at a discothèque on New Year s changes the equation. Joy falls in love with Jyoti, and after much wooing and persistence, both of them break their engagement. But fate plays a cruel joke on them and there is no sign of Joy as he disappears. Will Jyoti and Joy ever reunite?. This episode is produced by Manish R Goswami's Siddhant Cinevision		Sangeeta Ghosh, Joy Sengupta, Anang Desai, Shama Deshpande, Prithvi Zutshi, Rohit Sahgal, Madhu Malti, Manju Vyas
43	Dil Se... Lekin?	Neena (Divya Dutta) and Prem love each other and plan to marry. Neena learns that she is pregnant. Thrilled at the news, Prem promises to talk about their marriage with his father. But on his way home, he meets with an accident and dies. Fear of getting scorned by society for getting pregnant out of wedlock, Neena's family friends advise her to marry Sachin. She eventually relents. But will Neena be able carry this burden of lying to Sachin, for long? This episode is also produced in-house by Zee TV.		Divya Dutta, Nakul Vaid, Samar Jai Singh, Meena Nathani, Madan Joshi, Lalit Mohan Tiwari, Krishna Pal, Maya Alagh, Rohini Hattangadi
44	Mujrim	Inspector Vivek Gupta (Vikram Gokhale) working with the Police Force is a man of high scruples. A year away from retirement, he is given orders by his senior to arrest the murderer, Neelkant Sawant, who has been absconding for 6 months after murdering the renowned but amoral businessman Laxmanrai. Gupta reaches Neelkant s village and arrests him. While waiting for their train, Neelkant tells him he does not regret murdering Laxmanrai as he had killed many labourers by exploiting them. Even Gupta fosters feelings of hatred for Laxmanrai because his younger brother and nephew had lost their lives due to Laxmanrai s atrocities. Realising that Neelkant is indeed a good man otherwise, he asks him to escape and start life afresh. Will Neelkant heed him? What about Inspector Gupta s famed principles? This episode is also produced by Meteor Films.		Vikram Gokhale, Suneel Sinha, Jahangir Khan, Sunil Shende, Phalguni Parikh, Madhuri Sanjeev, Shweta Gautam, Prashant, Sanjeev Choudhary
45	Saughaat	For Eijaz, it was love at first sight. He gets totally smitten by Sabiah when he sees her for the first time at a jeweller shop. And when he learns that he has got a marriage proposal for a girl named Salma from the same home where Sabiah lives in, he readily agrees thinking the girl is Sabiah. Sabiah decides to play a prank on him and impersonates herself as her friend Salma. What will happen once the truth is out? Will Ehjaz agree to marry Salma, or will it be only Sabiah for him? And what about Sabiah? Will she betray her close friend Salma? This episode is also produced by Adib Contructor and Tarun Chopra's Picasso		Tejaswini Kolhapure, Vaquar Shaikh, Tuhina Vohra, Md. Himayathullah, Aslam Farshori, Ayesha Jalili, Rashmi Seth, Adeel Hakim
46	Itni Choti Baat, Itni Lambi Raat	Two little children, Atul and Gudiya, are unable to figure out what s wrong with elders and why they are constantly fighting. Fed up with their parents perpetual bickering, they decide to run away from home. With their pocket money, they roam all around and find adults fighting everywhere. They vow that when they grow up, they will never fight. Finally they settle for the night in a jungle. Their parents worried sick, come to the jungle in search of them. Are they able to trace their children? Will the children return to their parents? This episode is also produced by Girish Malik's Clap-Stem.		Raju Kher, Manju Alagh, Benjamin Gilani, Nandita Puri, Amey P. Ambulkar, Isha Talwar, Ravi Gossain (special appearance)
47	Shyamli	Shyamli (Pallavi Joshi), a journalist, has always been scorned at because of her dark complexion. Her sister Gauri is fair, so her father (Benjamin Gilani) and she mock at Shyamli's skin colour all the time. However, for Satyen, who is a photographer in the same organisation, Shyamli is the most beautiful woman. She is working on an article about how the world loves only good looking people. As always, Satyen promises to assist her in her work but on one condition that she agrees to marry him once it is over. Meanwhile, even Gauri has her eyes on Satyen and forces him to have a photo shoot with her. She even manages to simultaneously charm Satyen's mother and marry him. Shyamli's father is furious with Gauri and when he's about to blurt the truth to Gauri, Shyamli stops him. What is this truth about Gauri which Shymali does not want her to know? This episode is produced by Asha Parekh under Akruti.		Benjamin Gilani, Pallavi Joshi, Royman Singh, Bobby Vats
48	Ishq Hua! Kaise Hua!	A chain of love story about eight people. But not a single person's feeling is reciprocated. A comedy of errors. It begins with Shweta who loves Tarun (Rajiv Paul), who has eyes only for Pammi. Pammi, in turn, is totally smitten by Akshay who has lost his heart to Seema. Seema has a dog Kukku who is madly in love with Pishti, a female dog owned by Mr. Pitawala. Pitawala simply can not get enough of Saroj, a middle-aged divorcée. But Saroj is totally infatuated by Anshu, a boy half her age. And completing this circle of love is Anshu who is in love with Shweta. A music band formed by Anshu, Shweta and Akshay celebrate their launch party on Valentine's Day. Is this going to be the day when feelings of love will be expressed? This episode is produced by Kashmira and Vidyadhar Pathare under Iris Productions.		Roshan Abbas, Navneet Nishan, Sohrab Ardeshir, Iravati Harshe, Karan Oberoi, Devika Shahani, Rajeev Paul, Reena Kapoor, Dilip Thadeshwar, Puggy, Cheemu
49	Wapsi	Both Sujata and her husband Ashish decide that he should go to the US for research for a year or so. And thus begins a never ending, long wait for Sujata. Gripped with feelings of dejection, she finds a caring friend in her neighbour Sandeep (Harsh Chaya). One day when she returns home, she finds Ashish there. Her happiness knows no bounds. But she soon realises that Ashish is a changed man now, with him having no time for her, and everything revolving only around his work. What is Sujata going to do now? Is their marriage going to survive this change of equation? This episode is also produced by Picasso.		Harsh Chaya
50	Rang di Chunaria	Priyakant (Madhavan) is a happy-go-lucky guy and comes to visit his friend s wife (Jaya Bhattacharya) along with his friend on the occasion of Holi, the festival of colours. One look at Kusum (Gracy Singh), and Priyakant is totally smitten. However, he is blissfully unaware that Kusum is a child widow, and pours coloured water on her on Holi. Kusum s family is shocked at this behaviour, and that s when he is told that Kusum is a widow. Will Priyakant stop loving Kusum now? This episode is also produced by V3tv.		Gracy Singh, Jaya Bhattacharya, Madhavan
51	Ek Din...	After 20 years of being a housewife, of Vishal (Mehul Buch). Priya (Divya Seth) takes up a career as a fashion designer, where she meets her boss Ritu (Shefali Chaya). The two instantly take a liking towards each other and become best of buddies in a matter of just a few hours. On a professional overnight trip together, they end up talking about their personal lives. Priya learns that Ritu is having an affair with a married man. She urges Ritu to ask him to either leave his wife, or else she will end the relationship. Just then, he phones Ritu. However, she cannot get herself to say so, and she gives the phone to Priya. But Priya s world gets shattered when she hears the voice of the man at the other end of the phone. Who is this man? This episode is produced by Manjul Sinha's Fantasia.		Divya Seth, Shefali Chaya and Mehul Buch
52	Cross connection	Vishaka (Sonali Kulkarni) is an aggressive girl, while her good friend Smita is timid. Whenever Smita is in trouble, Vishaka helps her out. Once, while they are talking over the phone, they get a cross connection where Anand (Akshay Anand) also starts talking to them. Something makes Smita divulge Vishaka s phone number to him. Thus begin regular telephonic conversations between Vishaka and Anand, and one day they agree to meet. As she is nervous, Vishaka asks Smita to impersonate her, and Anand asks Uday (Anup Soni) to do the same for him. Uday and Smita vibe well instantly. But how are Vishaka and Anand going to react when they realise that their friend is in love with the person they were interested in? This episode is also produced by Saaransh		Akshay Anand, Anup Soni, Sonali Kulkarni
53	My Hero	Rahul is the son of estranged couple, Mohini and Dilip, and because of this, he ends up dividing his time between both his parents. Mohini always makes deriding comments about what a failure Dilip is, but for Rahul, his father is his super hero. For the first time, Rahul asks for an expensive music system for his birthday from his father. Rahul being a terminally ill cancer patient, Dilip does not want to disappoint him although he knows that arranging for such a big amount of money will be tough. Is the father going to be able to fulfil his dying son's last wish? This episode is also produced by Karma Television.		Rajesh Khera, Supriya Karnik, Arun Bali
54	Rang	Rahul has been born blind and because of this handicap, his mother, Mrs. Singh (Surekha Sikri) has sheltered him from the world. And to such an extent that he has not been allowed to make any friends. His only friend is his mother. But this changes when Bindiya becomes his new neighbour. They become good friends, and when Bindiya hears him sing, she takes him to a music company. She urges him to have a career of his own, to befriend people, to be independent. Although Bindiya has the noblest intentions, Mrs. Singh is furious with her and asks her not to show Rahul false dreams. Is Rahul ever going to get a chance to live life as per his wish? This episode is produced by Vivek Bahl's White Cloud.		Surekha Sikri, Joy Sengupta as Rahul, Nivedita Bhattacharya as Bindiya
55	Tanha-Tanha	Samir (Akshay Anand) loves Suman but has never been able to muster the courage to confess his feelings to her. And then it gets too late as Rohit (Aman Verma) announces in college one day that Suman and he are getting married. Years later, Suman and Samir meet again. She tells him that her marriage to Rohit was a disaster and then asks him to marry her. It's a long cherished dream come true for Samir. However, his dream crashes as he finds her gone away for good. Why did Suman come into Samir's life again and why did she go away so suddenly? This episode is produced by Surinder Kaur's Shivranjani Kala Sangam.	02-04-1999	Akshay Anand, Aman Verma
56	Mere Saath Chalogi...	Considering her aged mother Sylvia (Shefali Chaya) to be a burden, her daughter, Sandy, puts her in a Home for the Aged, promising to take her to Australia a few months later. Sylvia cannot wait to get out of the home and eagerly awaits her daughter s letter. However, Sandy finally writes that it ll be tough for her to take Sylvia to Australia. On the other hand, is Avinash (Annu Kapoor) who has lost his best friend Prabhakar. Devastated, Avinash plans to slit his wrist and kill himself. At the same time, Sylvia also plans to commit suicide by consuming sleeping tablets. Is it the end of the road for Avinash and Sylvia, or does fate have some other plans for them? This episode is also produced by Fantasia.	09-04-1999	Annu Kapoor, Shefali Chaya
57	Vasundhara	Inder s mother gets him married to a village belle Vasundhara. Vasundhara wonders why her husband sleeps in a different room, so she tries hard to entice him but of no avail. She asks his mother what s wrong, and she says that Inder is impotent and that she got him married only to avoid societal scorn. Feeling like an incomplete woman, the man of Vasundhara s affection soon turns out to be the family driver, Kailash (Ravi Gosain). Inder and his mother plan to get Vasundhara pregnant through artificial insemination but she announces that she is already carrying Kailash s child. Will Inder and his mother accept her baby? Or will Vasundhara leave them and go away with Kailash? This episode is also produced by Karma Television.	16-04-1999	Ravi Gosain
58	Highway	Veera and her fiancé, Vinay, go for a drive and park on a highway when they are accosted by thugs. They kidnap Veera. Vijay (Aditya Srivastava), the head of the group plans to sell Veera but the plan is put on hold as he learns that her fiancé's father is a police commissioner. Veera and Vijay spend time together escaping to another place. Veera confides to him that she was raped as a child. She's surprised at herself that Vijay is the only person she has ever spoken about it to. She tells him that she feels very safe when he is around because he would not let any harm befall her. Having a change of heart, Vijay asks her to escape and return to her home. But will she? This episode was produced by Nirang Desai and Sandeep A. Varma.	23-04-1999	Aditya Srivastava, Imtiaz Ali, Kartika Rane
59	Pehchaan	Raaj lives with his wife Malika and her son Prateek. Even though, Prateek is not his biological son Raaj loves him like his own and wishes to legally adopt him. Malika, however, vehemently opposes the idea. One day Malika passes away in an accident. Raaj tries to legally adopt Prateek but the more he tries to find out about Malika's past to begin legal proceedings the more he finds out how much he did not know his late wife. Why was Malika so resistant to the idea of Raaj legally adopting Prateek? What was the secret she tried so desperately to hide during her lifetime?	30-04-1999	Mamik Singh, Abha Dhulia
60	Ek Ghar Ye bhi	Amla (Divya Seth) is an attractive widow with two young, beautiful children. The younger one, Mallika is very fond of her mother but the elder one Tulika (Smita Bansal) fosters a certain amount of dislike as well as envy because Amla is a total charmer and vibes very well with everybody, including Tulika s own friends. Tulika abhors her mother s flirtatious ways and makes no bones to conceal her disgust. Is Amla ever going to succeed in reaching out to Tulika and making her understand the truth? This episode is produced by Rajesh Kumar's Abhivyakti Production.	07-05-1999	Divya Seth, Smita Bansal
61	Zameen	Sanju s father had left his native land of Kashmir for better prospects but he always fostered a desire to return. However, because of the persistent tensions prevailing in Kashmir, Sanju would keep dissuading him from going. His father s dying wish was to have his ashes strewn in the picturesque valleys and river of Kashmir. So Sanju leaves for Kashmir to fulfil it. He is totally taken in by the beauty of the place and fosters feelings of oneness with it and its people. Here, he learns about the infinite love people have for their land and admires their unshakeable faith that peace will prevail in their land. This episode is also produced by Tracinema.	14-05-1999	
62	Saayon ke Pare	Ameeta is happily married to Vivek and has a grown-up daughter Anu (Sweta Keswani). Ameeta finds out that her new boss is her ex-boyfriend Kiran (Milind Soman). They exchange pleasantries and soon, Kiran and Anu begin to spend much time together. But this disturbs Ameeta immensely and it starts affecting her professional and personal life. Kiran and Anu, although hesitant about their age difference initially, finally accept that what s most important is to like being with one another. But is Ameeta ever going to let this relationship work? This episode is produced by Manmohan Shetty and Pradeep Uppoor's Neo Films.	21-05-1999	Milind Soman, Sweta Keswani
63	Dil Hi Toh Hai]	Rajiv-Parineeta and Akash-Deepti are two couples who live as tenants in Mona Kapoor s (Rita Bhaduri) bungalow. Rajiv is interested in garment manufacturing, while Parineeta loves classical music. But her singing drives Rajiv crazy. On the other hand, Akash loves music, whereas Deepti wants to open a clothes boutique someday. This similarity of likes and dislikes ends up in Rajiv-Deepti and Akash-Parineeta forging a close bond. And thus begins an infatuation which continues till they are caught red-handed by their spouses. Will their marriages last, or will they swap partners and go their separate ways? This episode is produced by Aruna Sangal and Virendra Singh's Murlidhar Creations.	28-05-1999	Rita Bhaduri
64	Ek Boond Aasmaan	Sagar, a writer, comes to Mumbai, the city of dreams, to accomplish his goal. But soon he realises how harsh the city can be. He manages to get accommodation in a room which he has to share with a girl Kamal. Initially he is reluctant but when the landlord refuses to return his advance money, he has no choice but to stay back. Kamal too is furious first, but gradually, they start bonding. Sagar gets a break to write for a TV serial but he is unable to get himself to write commercial gibberish. Meanwhile, Kamal gets a big break of being a heroine for a film. Is success going to put her relationship with Sagar to an end? This episode is produced by Gaurab Pandey's Continuity Productions.	04-06-1999	
65	Ittefaque	Anna, a rich girl, is deeply in love with Roarick, a poor boy. When her father, Sir Adam, learns of her affair, he stops her from meeting Roarick. But love conquers all hurdles and they continue to see each other. They plan to meet in a church one night and marry. But fate has other plans and the two don't meet in the church. Assuming that Anna didn t turn up, Roarick joins the army. In an ensuing war, Roarick loses his life. After many years, Anna meets Richard and she falls in love again. Although Richard is in love with her, he tells her that he can never marry her. Why can not he marry her? This episode is also produced by S.K. Media.	11-06-1999	
66	I Love You Papa]	Aashu dotes on her father Brijesh (Ashutosh Rana). For her, he is the best dad in the world. However, she feels totally betrayed when she reads his diary one day and learns that there s another woman in his life. Her attitude towards him undergoes a drastic change and Brijesh is unable to figure out why, so he asks his wife Preeti to find out what s wrong. Aashu tells her mother how her father is cheating on her. How is Preeti going to react? Will Brijesh and his family ever be a happy family again? This episode is produced by Irfan and Gul Khan's Media India.	18-06-1999	Ashutosh Rana, Shruti Ulfat, Neha Pendse, Harshad Ghodke
67	Saahil	Mr. Samant (Benjamin Gilani) brings his son, Rohit, to a drug rehabilitation centre so that he s cured of his addiction. Here, Rohit meets a very young boy, Dakan, a street urchin who is also a drug addict like him. They become thick friends. But they can not give up drugs and supplying their quota is the nurse in the centre. However, with Tanya, a girl next door, entering Rohit's life, things change. Rohit asks Dakan to quit taking drugs because he is so young but Dakan tells him that he will do so, provided Rohit also gives up. Meanwhile, a bond of attraction grows between Rohit and Tanya. She senses this and leaves the town without informing Rohit and Dakan. Rohit is totally dejected. Will this despair drive Rohit back to drugs? This episode is produced by Govind Ubhe's Aadyot 3S Creations.	25-06-1999	Benjamin Gilani
68	Daisy – The Dog	V.V. Kamat (Akash Khurana) is a retired, introverted bachelor who becomes the new neighbour of Arundhati (Bhakti Barve Inmadar), a vivacious and friendly lady and who also lives alone. His only companion is his dog Daisy. Arundhati goes out of her way to befriend him and his dog. Daisy gives in to her charms easily but Kamat gets irritated with Arundhati s kindness. One day, the carpenter mistakenly interchanges their doors after repairing. When Kamat returns with Daisy from a long walk, he wonders why his door is not opening. He then tries the key to Arundhati s house, and when he walks into her house, he gets the shock of his life. What does Kamat see in her house that knocks him out of his senses? This episode is produced by Supriya Sachin's Sushriya Arts.	02-07-1999	Akash Khurana, Bhakti Barve Inmadar
69	Fasaad	On a night fraught with intense riots in town, Nikhat finds Javed, her ex-husband, at her doorstep. Javed had written to her saying he wanted to meet her. She has still not been able to forgive him for accusing her of carrying another man s baby. After reading Nikhat s novel which is a little autobiographical, Javed realises that Javeda is indeed his own daughter and wants to visit her. A while later, his present wife, Jamila, who is also Nikhat s cousin, comes to her house. Bitterness is spewed between the cousins, and Nikhat accuses Jamila of always trying to snatch Javed away from her. But Jamila surprises her by saying that she is here to repent. Is she only going to apologise, or is there something more she has to say? This episode is produced by Gulshan Sachdev's Film & Shots.	09-07-1999	
70	Naya Vivah	Leelavati (Seema Bhargav) is ailing but her husband Dangamal (Sri Vallabh Vyas) doesn t spend much time with her. All Leelavati longs for is to have her husband by her side but he brushes her aside every time saying she is too old to ask for romance. His cook also goes away to his native place because his wife is ailing. One day, after visiting a courtesan, when Dangamal returns home, he finds Leelavati dead. He is shattered. The cook s grandson, Jugal, comes to Dangamal s doorstep to tend to him but Dangamal shoos him away. Dangamal s friends urge him to remarry and even suggest a young girl, Asha (Smita Bansal), for him. When she marries him, he asks Jugal to come back as a cook as he doesn t want Asha to do any work. Being of the same age, Jugal and Asha share a very amicable relationship, and jealousy consumes Dangamal. Is this relationship going to destroy Dangamal s new marriage? This episode is produced by Tarun Mathur under T.M. Productions which he also directed this episode and Amit Anil Biswas and Vivek Ratnakar Talpade's AVA Entertainment Ltd.	16-07-1999	Seema Bhargav, Sri Vallabh Vyas
71	Bheegey Pal	Sanjay is thrilled about meeting his wife, Rashmi, after a year as his ship had got marooned and they were not in touch. He manages to hitch a ride from Subhash . When Sanjay reaches home, he is shocked to learn that his wife has sold the house. Dejected, he walks away and bumps into Subhash again who asks him to stay in his guest house. Sanjay cannot believe his eyes when he sees that Subhash s wife is his very own Rashmi. Sanjay and she meet on the sly and Rashmi tells him that she had no choice but to marry because of family pressure. Sanjay says that they can start life afresh. She is now pregnant with Subhash s baby. Subhash learns about Rashmi and her past. He allows Rashmi to make her choice to spend the rest of her life with him or with Sanjay. Will she return to the love of her life or will decide to remain with the father of her unborn baby? This episode is also produced by Karma Television.	23-07-1999	
72	Svetlana	Svetlana is a thoroughly spoilt and extremely temperamental girl. She hates to socialise and even refuses to go to college despite her parents asking her to. Then Uday, a distant relative, comes to stay with them, and Svetlana begins to look upon him as a friend although he is 10–12 years older than her. Soon, this friendship blooms into love, but only for Svetlana. The love of Uday s life is Meera, who also comes to stay in Svetlana s house. Svetlana is as spiteful as can be with Meera. Is Meera going to give her a fit reply, or is she going to end Svetlana s bitterness? This episode is also produced by Clap-Stem.	01-08-1999	
73	Lucky 7	For Sadanand (Rituraj Singh), his entire life is ruled by the number 7 because he believes it is his lucky number. He reads in a book that he will meet his life partner at 7 past 7 near the 7th Cross Road on the 7th, so he goes to see who this girl is. And right enough, he bumps into Suparna (Gracy Singh). He is doubly thrilled when he learns that she works on the 7th floor and her birth date is 7.7.77. Love blossoms between the two, but when he proposes marriage to her, she refuses. She confesses that it was a prank played by his friends Arvind (Ashiesh Roy) and Tanya. However, she is really in love with him now. She also mentions that she was born on Friday, the 13th. Sadanand cannot believe that the girl he loves was born on such an inauspicious date and walks away. Will love be able to conquer Sadanand s superstitions? This episode is also produced by Clap-Stem.	08-08-1999	Ashiesh Roy, Gracy Singh, Rituraj Singh
74	Kaptaan Chachi	Ganga (Himani Shivpuri) affectionately called Chachi by all in her colony is a staunch patriot. Her husband had fought for the independence of the country. A baby showers ceremony is being held for Chanda, the wife of Suraj, an army officer. But Suraj gets a call to report to duty immediately as the enemy has attacked the country, so he leaves. One day, they receive news that Suraj valiantly died a martyr. While the others prepare Chanda to dress like a widow, Ganga stops them and tells them that the wife of a martyr can never be a widow because he remains immortal, just the way she herself is. Everyone is shocked to hear that Ganga is also a widow. Is she going to be ostracised now that they know the truth? This episode is also produced by Meteor Films.	15-08-1999	Himani Shivpuri
76	Karuna	Karuna is fed up with the injustices being inflicted on her by her husband Rajan. He has been using her for his illicit drug dealing businesses and physically abuses her as well. However, one fine day, Karuna decides that enough is enough and leaves her home with the children. She starts living with her father who is a drunkard. Rajan gets one more drug dealing assignment and he knows that only Karuna can help him in getting this job done easily. He goes to her father s house and takes the children with him. Karuna is furious with her father and goes to bring back the kids. Will she succeed in getting her children back, or is there something else in store? This episode is also produced by Zee TV itself.	29-08-1999	
77	Sir	Pinaki Ghosh is an unemployed post-graduate. His entire day is spent whiling away time with the rich, useless boys in his colony. Despite his mother repeatedly pleading with him to get any job, Pinaki does not heed her. There s a little boy named Mohit who runs errands for Pinaki. His father, Mr. Gupta, (Anant Mahadevan) is very indebted to Pinaki s family as it Dr. Ghosh, Pinaki s father, who had saved Mohit's life when he was ill. Mr. Gupta suggests to Pinaki to teach Mohit for an hour everyday, and Pinaki s mother immediately agrees. Pinaki, however, is not happy but relents. Mohit and Pinkai do anything but study. Mohit fails in his examinations, and Pinaki then realises that knowledge must be spread. He turns stern with Mohit and even starts studying for his Civil Services exams too. Are Pinaki and Mohit going to pass their exams with flying colours? This episode is also produced by Meteor Films.	05-09-1999	Anant Mahadevan
78	Ankahe Ehsaas	Sonali and Dolly are mischievous daughters of Dilip Dhawan and Anita Kanwal. The mother being strict, the daughters often ask their father to act as an alibi for their late evening outings and other such pranks. But they are one happy family, However, a cruel twist of fate snatches the mother away when she dies in an accident. Soon, Sonali, being the elder one, takes the responsibilities of the home and even sacrifices her studies. But Dolly now begins to find Sonali very overbearing as she is constantly correcting Dolly. Things get out of hand once and Dolly walks out of the house. Sonali is devastated. Will the cracks in the sisters relationship ever be mended? This episode is also produced by Gulshan Sachdev's Film & Shots.	12-09-1999	
79	Imtihaan	Keerti has been shown Avinash s (Akash Anand) photograph for marriage. Her outgoing and modern friend Shikha (Reena Kapoor) suggests that she test him first before taking the plunge. So Keerti, a simple and homely girl turns into Shikha, a straightforward, modern girl and goes to meet Avinash. They begin to court regularly and Avinash proposes marriage to Keerti. He asks her to spend 2 nights with him on his birthday and Keerti doesn't want to disappoint him. He spikes her drink and when Keerti wakes up, she is horrified to hear from Avinash about what happened the previous night. Avinash then starts avoiding her completely. Keerti is heartbroken. Is Keerti going to pay a heavy price for the rest of her life because of one mistake? This episode is produced by Manjit Singh Sethi's V.M. Films	19-09-1999	Akash Anand, Reena Kapoor
80	Sirf Tum	Meghna and Ayesha (Tejaswini Kolhapure) are inseparable buddies and work in the same advertising agency. However, Meghna is a closed and temperamental girl, while Ayesha is a warm person. A talented copywriter, Vikram (Amir Bashir), joins their firm. Meghna makes it very clear that he will not sit in her cabin, so he sits with Ayesha. Ayesha and Vikram become friends. The campaign which was Meghna s dream is given to Vikram. Professional and personal jealousy consume Meghna. She sabotages Vikram s work on the very day of his presentation, so that she can show it to the clients. Returning home triumphant after getting the deal, Meghna wants to celebrate with Ayesha, but Ayesha has learnt the truth and packed her bags. Will Meghna try and reconcile the differences with Ayesha? This episode is also produced by Picasso.	26-09-1999	Tejaswini Kolhapure, Kanchan, Aamir Bashir, Amar Talwar
81	Phir Subah Hogi	"Raghupathi Raghav Rajaram" song played throughout the episode (Mukhda and instrumental). In the quest to garland Gandhiji s statue first, two rival political parties end up creating a riot in town which leaves many dead. At the same time, Avinash s wife goes into labour. With great difficulty he manages to take her to the hospital. To add to his woes, Avinash (Ravi Gosain) is told by the doctor to get blood for his wife which is a rare AB negative. He is given a list by the doctor. However, when he sets out, he is followed by an angry mob. Avinash seeks refuge behind a memorial of Gandhiji. Dejected, Avinash weeps inconsolably, and he finds Gandhiji come alive and urging him to go ahead and seek the help of those with the same blood group as his wife. Confronted with hurdles with every person, Avinash loses hope but Gandhiji urges him to be persuasive and hopeful. Is this hope going to save Avinash s wife? This episode is also produced by Meteor Films.	03-10-1999	Suhas Bhalekar, Ravi Gossain, Shweta Rastogi, Yunus Parvez, Shail Chaturvedi
82			10-10-1999	
83			17-10-1999	
84	Agreement	Neera (Nivedita Bhattacharya) wants no man or love in her life, but yes, she does want a baby a baby of her own. For this, she finds an unemployed man Sagar (Aashif Sheikh). She makes an agreement for him which binds him until she gets pregnant. They go to a hill station and spend many nights together. Here, they bump into Neera s friend, Menaka (Eva Grover). Soon, Sagar and Menaka start to spend much time together. Meanwhile, even Neera finds herself falling in love with Sagar. But once Neera gets pregnant, Sagar takes his money and is only too happy to leave. Sagar and Menaka get engaged. One day, he sees Neera with her baby, and paternal feelings overwhelm him. He starts spending time in Neera s house to be with his baby. Is this going to affect Sagar and Menaka s relationship? This episode is produced by Siddhartha and Sujata Sengupta's Maiden Films.	24-10-1999	Aasif Sheikh, Nivedita Bhattacharya, Eva Grover
85	Sparsh	Akanksha (Mandira Bedi) comes on a short break to Matheran to get away from the hustle and bustle of Mumbai. Here, she meets Vineet (Rohit Roy), who lost his eyesight in a car accident. Akanksha sees in him a person with multitude of assets and thoroughly enjoys his company. They spend much time together and she falls in love with him. They come to Mumbai, and Akanksha takes him to an eye specialist friend (Shailendra Singh) who assures Vineet that his eyesight can surely be restored. And right enough, Vineet is able to see after his operation. However, after a few days, he starts experiencing frequent blackouts. When he goes for a check-up, the doctor tells Vineet that he will soon turn blind again. Where is this going to leave Vineet and Akanksha s relationship? This episode is produced by Shashi Ranjan's Shashi Ranjan Enterprises.	31-10-1999	Mandira Bedi, Rohit Roy, Shailendra Singh, Payal, Umesh Bajpai
86	Roshni	Raman (Virendra Singh) and Kavita (Roma) convince their little son, Raju, to stay alone with their helper on Diwali night so that they can celebrate the festival by playing cards in Raman s friend s house. After protesting initially, Raju agrees to be left alone. No sooner have they left, when the helper gets drunk and passes out. A thief (Arif Zakaria) tries to steal sweets and fireworks for his son from Raju s house but while he s escaping, he hears Raju screaming for help. Raju is surrounded by fireworks and the thief rescues him. He tends to Raju completely. Raju insists that he stays back as he is afraid of being alone. The thief admits to Raju that he had come to steal for his son but Raju does not believe him. The thief then shows Raju how Diwali, the festival of lights, is actually celebrated. Is the thief eventually going to steal from Raju s house? This was the last episode to be produced by Meteor Films.	07-11-1999	Arif Zakaria, Virendra Singh, Roma, Sunil Jetley, Anil Sinha, Master Harsh
87	Friendship	Sonu, Gaurav and Puneet have been thick friends from childhood and even go to the same school. The three have to now change their school. Sonu is very enamoured with a group of 3 rich boys here, so he leaves Gaurav and Puneet to be a part of this gang. As they mock him for getting his lunch box from home, Sonu tells his mother (Sudha Chandran) not to give him lunch. He begins to avoid Gaurav and Puneet and ends up being a stooge of the new gang. Have the gang of rich boys actually accepted Sonu or are they merely using him? Will Sonu, Gaurav and Puneet ever become thick friends? This episode is also produced by Picasso.	14-11-1999	Sudha Chandran, Abhinay Patekar, Rahul Dhanwani, Nayan Joshi, Vishal Thakkar, Manmohan, Eklaviya, Joy Sengupta (special appearance)
88	Kisko Pata Tha...	Ronnie (Mohan Kapur), a widower in Goa, has a little son Georgie. Georgie and his friend Anu try to find a match for Ronnie through the radio. Pooja (Arti chabria), living in Mumbai, is engaged to Ramprakash Upadhyay, a geek. She hears Georgie s appeal for a mother on the radio. Listening to Ronnie s love for his deceased wife, Pooja is moved to tears. On behalf of Ronnie, Georgie corresponds and speaks with Pooja. Georgie tells her that they will meet on Valentine s Day outside the Asiatic Library. Ronnie flatly refuses Georgie when he says they should leave for Mumbai. Meanwhile, Pooja is to marry on Valentine's Day. Will Georgie s desire of seeing Pooja as his new mother be fulfilled? This episode is also produced by Satyen Kappu's Kappu Arts.	21-11-1999	Mohan Kapoor, Naveen Bawa, Rajesh Khera, Mona Bhattacharya, Kinshuk Vaidya, Aarti Chabria, Deepa Jangiani
89	Ikraar	Rahul s father (Satyen Kappu) is always in an irritable mood. He snaps at his son and daughter-in-law Sapna (Mahroo Sheikh) for everything. Rahul consults his friend and psychiatrist Vinod who suggests that they get his father a companion because this attitude change has resulted after his wife's death. And so they employ a housekeeper, Savitri, (Sulbha Arya) in their house. Resistant initially, the father slowly realises that Savitri is a welcome change in his life. They begin to enjoy each other s company, and soon, there s a remarkable change in the father s temperament. A grouchy man turns into an amicable person. However, one day, Savitri tells Sapna that she will leave because she has actually fallen in love with her father-in-law. Sapna and Rahul decide to play a prank to make the father confess his feelings for Savitri. Are they going to succeed in their mission? This episode is also produced by Maiden Films.	28-11-1999	Satyen Kappu, Sulbha Arya, Rahul Singh, Mahru Sheikh, Varun Vardhan
90	Ek tha Anshu....	Anshu (Parzaan Dastur) has been an orphan but believes that Aunt Flossy in Nainital is his mother. However, feeling unloved, he goes to another town and joins a beedi factory. Here, Shekhar (Mahesh Thakur) meets him and instantly develops a liking towards him. He wants to take Anshu to Nainital to his parents but Anshu escapes. Anshu keeps meeting people, befriending them and then going away every time he feels unwanted. But Shekhar is bent on finding Anshu and adopting him. Will Shekhar be able to trace Anshu? This episode is also produced by Imaginatio.	05-12-1999	Parzaan Dastur, Mahesh Thakur
91	No Mom!	Julia (Preeti Dayal) treats Roy (Vishal Malhotra) like a child and is over-protective about him. However, he enrolls in an Arts college on the sly and gets admission there. Fearing how his mother will react, Roy is surprised when she starts worrying about his shopping. Having tasted freedom at last, Roy is very happy to be away from home. But he is surprised when he suddenly finds Julia in his cottage with his friends. Seeing her mingle with them so easily makes Roy very upset. And at the party, he gives vent to his suppressed feelings and tells Julia how he has always hated her for trying to rule his life at every juncture. How is Julia going to react to this outburst? This episode is also produced by Clap-Stem.	12-12-1999	Vishal Malhotra, Preeti Dayal, Rio Kapadia, Kanika Shivpuri, Radhika Menon, Nilesh, Aditi Gulati, Dinesh Khanna, Amit
92	Subah ki Dhoop	Snigdha (Mona Ambegaonkar) is a good actress but has been jobless from 2 months. With her unable to foot her mother s mounting medical expenses, her friend, Prashant, offers her a 2-month contract of being the wife of DK (Pawan Malhotra) for a sum of Rs. 100,000/-. Snigdha takes up the offer. She tries her best to get DK into the outside world, to make him laugh. In the process, she finds herself in love with him. However, she receives a cheque from DK a week before the termination of her contract. Furious that he left without even saying goodbye, Snigdha goes to Prashant to ask why. And Prashant discloses that DK is terminally ill. Will Snigdha make one final attempt to meet DK? This episode is produced by Hemendra Kumar Bhatia's Red Pepper.	19-12-1999	Mona Ambegaonkar, Pawan Malhotra
93	Baat Ek Raat Ki	Samarth (Harsh Chaya) is such a workaholic that he s in office till late even a day before his wedding. The office peon, assuming that everyone has left for the day, locks him and his secretary, Kavita (Nivedita Bhattacharya). Thus, they are forced to spend time together until their colleague comes to their rescue. Kavita asks Samarth to use this time doing something else other than work. Finally, Mr. Mathur arrives and Samarth offers to reach Kavita by car but his car breaks down. They walk in the rain to her house. She tells him that she would marry only for love and could never dream of getting married the way he is only for business reasons. Samarth returns home but is unable to get Kavita off his mind. He goes to his fiancée, Reena's house to tell her that they are not suited for each other. Is Samarth going to go back to Kavita and confess his feelings for her? This was the last episode to be produced by Karma Television.	26-12-1999	
94	Bargad ki Chhaon	Anant (Anoop Soni), a doctor, dotes on his daughter Kannu (Mansi Joshi Roy) but his wife Shree detests her. One day, fed up with Shree s constant jibes about him and his daughter, he shoots himself. After Anant's death, Shree realises her folly and tries to mend bridges between her and Kannu. Kannu fulfils her dad s last wish and grows up to be a doctor. Shree gives her Anant s last letter in which he mentions about Sabah (Mansi Joshi Roy), a simple and na ve girl who had entered his life like a breath of fresh air. Distance had grown between Anant and Shree because she was unable to conceive, and Sabah begins to pervade his senses. One night, passion gets the better of Anant and Sabah. Anant learns later that Sabah is pregnant with his child. Who is this child? And how does Shree react when she hears about this? This episode is also produced by Asha Parekh's Akruti.	02-01-2000	Anoop Soni, Mansi Joshi Roy
95	[Eid	Zehra is very indifferent to her two younger children Aseem and Sabah but when it concerns her elder son, Zayed (Vatsal Seth), she is very possessive. Her husband's (Dilip Dhawan) nephew, Aftab (Karanvir Bohra) comes to stay with them for his engineering admission. Aftab instantly forms a bond with Aseem and Sabah but Zehra is very cold to him. Aftab takes the kids to the beach and for a film, and when they return late, their father slaps him. The next day, he tells Aftab that Zayed had got drowned on the festival of Eid 2 years back. But Zehra still believes Zayed will return. Aftab tells everyone to keep Zayed s memories alive but to not stop living. However, when Zehra sees Eid celebrations on in her house, she is furious with Aftab and the others. Will Aftab be able to convince Zehra to stop mourning for Zayed and continue to live life? This episode is also produced by Picasso.	09-01-2000	Dilip Dhawan, Vatsal Seth, Karanvir Bohra
96	Badalte Rishtey	Shivendra Singh (Shakti Singh) insults his elder brother Birendra Singh of being negligent and holds him responsible for his son Akshay s accident. Both the brothers go their separate ways. After 17 years, Simran (Pallavi Joshi), the daughter-in-law of Shivendra, along with help from Akshay and the wives of Birendra and Shivendra vows to bring the estranged brothers together. She joins Birendra s company, and together with her accomplices, brings out the still existing feelings for each other in the brothers. But what is going to happen when the rival brothers find out about Simran s ploy? This episode is also produced by Maiden Films.	16-01-2000	Bharati Achrekar, Vineet, Shakti Singh, Deepan Vartak, Kanika Shivpuri, Neelam Gandhi, Pallavi Joshi
97	Talash	Meeta (Sonam Malhotra) works for a TV channel and she finds a scoop when an upcoming singer Pallavi Gupta accuses Arunab (Sachin Khedekar) of making sexual advances towards her in the past. Arunab s silence further strengthens Meeta s belief. However, she realises her blunder when a news item mentions that Pallavi was out of town on the said date. She apologises to Arunab and learns that he was an orphan who was given a new life when he was 8 years old by Baba (Rajiv Verma), and that the present house he s living in is his most precious possession. Arunab grows up to be a renowned ghazal singer. Meeta tells him that, ironically, she was orphaned when she was 8. Meeta and Arunab meet frequently and fall in love. One day, a lawyer summons her to inform that her maternal grandfather has willed his bungalow and money in her name. She realises that the bungalow is none other than the house where Arunab is living in. Is this issue going to be a bone of contention in their relationship? This episode is produced by Meena and Ravi Dewan's Modern Video Vision.	23-01-2000	Rajiv Verma, Sachin Khedekar, Sonam Malhotra
98	Shanno	Babulal (Anoop Soni) is a graduate who comes to Mumbai for work but ends up as a taxi driver. His passions are his taxi, writing poems and Shanno (Shefali Chaya). Shanno is a prostitute and he drives her around during her business hours. He loves her and wants to marry her but is unable to muster the courage. Her brother, Munna, asks him to bare his soul to her. Babulal asks Shanno if she never desires to love and marry someone but she mocks at it. She then asks Babulal whether it would matter to him if she went away for good with another man, and he says it would no make no difference to him. Shanno is upset and leaves the town for good with another man. Is this the end of the road for Babulal? Will he never confess his feelings for her? This episode is also produced by Fantasia.	30-01-2000	Anoop Soni, Shefali Chaya
99	Jhoota Sach	Parul (Sangeeta Ghosh) is a doctor and Surender (Varun Badole) visits her as a patient. Parul tells him that nothing s wrong. She is surprised to see that he is the boy whom she is going to marry. They begin to court before their engagement. Meanwhile, Surender s mother is adamant about matching Parul s horoscope with her son's but Parul s father tells her that Parul was an orphan when they brought her home. Surender s mother is aghast and asks Surender to call off the marriage. Parul s mother, Ranjana (Nandita Thakur) is upset with her husband for letting the truth out because Parul means the world to her. Will Parul accept her foster parents as her own? This episode is also produced by Picasso.	06-02-2000	Nandita Thakur, Sangeeta Ghosh, Varun Badole
100	Kuch Pal	Sheetal (Candida Fernandes) and her four friends go for an outing but their vehicle breaks down. A housekeeper, Khadke, offers them his master s bungalow for a nominal charge. But the owner, Anil Chaudhary (Atul Agnihotri) turns up unexpectedly. He tries to throw them out of the house but Sheetal refuses, saying they have paid for the house. He reluctantly agrees to let them stay. Sheetal tries to make Anil a less serious person than he is. They spend time together and both can sense undercurrents between them. On his birthday, Sheetal and her friends give him a surprise party. However, Preeti turns up there, and everyone s surprised when Anil introduces her to them as his fiancée. Sheetal and her friends leave his place the next day. Will Anil marry Preeti, or will he tell Sheetal about his feelings for her? This episode is also produced by Picasso.	13-02-2000	Atul Agnihotri, Candida Fernandes
101	Phir ek baar	This episode of Rishtey is about Uma (Natasha) and Sujoy Chaudary (Ram Kapoor) who are separated for four years but not divorced. Uma s dominant mother (Anita Kanwal) almost controls her life. She has even rented her house and shop to her own daughter Uma who is a fashion designer. On one hand, Uma s friend Ashok (Ragesh Asthana) proposes to her and her friend (Komolika) encourages her to agree to the proposal. But on the other hand, Sujoy suddenly returns to Uma's life. Sujoy wants to amend for his mistakes. Uma finds it extremely difficult to accept him back into her life. Will Uma accept Ashok as the new man in her life or will she reunite will her estranged husband? This episode is also produced by Hemendra Kumar Bhatia's Red Pepper.	20-02-2000	Anita Kanwal, Komolika, Natasha, Ragesh Asthana, Ram Kapoor
102	Qataar mein	This episode of Rishtey is a touching story of five retired friends. The protagonist Pappu (Parikshit Sahani) is the only bachelor among them. He has a faithful servant, fondly called Mama (Virendra Saxena) for company. The other four friends are Salim (Arun Bali), Billu (Sushil Parashar), Ajay (Ajit Mehra) and Mithu (Yashodhan Bal). All of them would meet every once in a while for a game of cards and wine. All was well until Mithu meets with a sudden death. This upsets Pappu and he becomes very gloomy. Just when things were getting back to normalcy, Salim suffers from a heart attack and he too passes away. This really shatters Pappu since his friends were the world for him. He loses interest in everything and gets into severe depression. This is when his servant Mama makes him realize that life shouldn t come to a standstill when a person departs. Life is about moving on. This episode is produced by Mahesh Shyamjee's Emotion Picture and Yash Chitra.	27-02-2000	Ajit Mehra, Arun Bali, Parikshit Sahani, Sushil Parashar, Virendra Saxena, Yashodhan Bal
103	Uljhan	The episode Uljhan is a story about Lalaji (Rajendra Gupta) who is a lawyer by profession and has a dutiful wife Mangala (Shama Deshpande). Mangala s young step sister Binni (Neha Pendse) has been living with Mangala and Lalaji from her childhood. They treat her like their own daughter. As Binni grows up Lalaji and Mangala begin to prepare for her marriage. But Mangala suddenly meets with a domestic accident and dies. Before breathing her last, she takes a promise from her husband that he would continue to treat Binni as his daughter and get her married with great pomp. But Lalaji begins to feel the lack of a woman in his life. Meanwhile, a money lender Munshi (Paintal) who has married thrice, brainwashes Lalaji into marrying Binni. Does Lalaji really marry Binni? Does he forget the promise he made to his late wife? This episode is also produced by Tarun Mathur's T.M. Productions, it was also produced by Paintal's The Makers.	02-04-2000	Neha Pendse, Rajendra Gupta, Shama Deshpande
104	Mili	The episode Mili is a sweet story about how relations of the heart can prove to be greater than blood relations. Raju commonly addressed as Chaddi is a poor, orphan boy who earns his living by singing songs in trains. He is very attached to Rafique, an elderly food stall owner at a railway station, who he calls Uncle . Rafique always gives him food and good advice. One day he finds a little girl smiling at him and following him. Initially Chaddi gets irritated but finally accepts her as his little sister. He even names her 'Mili . He grows extremely fond of her and dreams of making her a lawyer. He also gets her an admission in a school with the help of Rafiq. But the school has a hostel, so Chaddi has to part from her. He accepts the reality with a heavy heart, but is unable to get her out of his mind. Soon he learns that an Australian couple wants to adopt her. He is completely flabbergasted at the thought of losing her forever. But when he thinks from a broader prospective about the bright future that Mili would have, he feels happy to let go of her. This episode is also produced by Clap-Stem.	09-04-2000	
105	Khamoshiyaan	'Khamoshiyaan is a story whose central character is Akash (Aamir Bashir). Akash comes from a small town but is settled in an urban city, having a stable job. He has a very intimate relationship with his office colleague Sheetal (Sujata Sangamitra). But he has hidden a bitter truth from her. Since he belongs to a small town, his parents had got him married to a girl Vasudha (Mona Ambegaonkar) from the same town. On the wedding night, he realizes that Vasudha is deaf and dumb. He gets furious and leaves her. He comes back to town, never to look back. But suddenly after two years, a distant relative drops Vasudha at Akash s house without prior notice. He lets her stay but is not ready to accept her as his wife. Nevertheless, Vasudha does not lose heart and begins to do her domestic duties. It is true that the way to a man s heart is through his stomach. He begins to enjoy the food prepared by her and gradually develops a liking for her. When Akash reveals the truth to Sheetal, she shows much understanding towards him and wishes the best for him. Will Akash really leave Sheetal and accept Vasudha as his wife?? This episode is also produced by Iris Productions.	16-04-2000	Aamir Bashir, Mona Ambegaonkar, Sujata Sangamitra
106	Ek Aasman Mera Bhi...	Ek Aasman Mera Bhi is a story about a brother-sister relationship. Naseem (Navni Parihar) is Faizal's (Vaquar Sheikh) elder sister and is very possessive about him. She treats him like a child and keeps spoon feeding him for everything. Faizal too is totally dependent on her and dreads the thought of parting from her. He is a professor and is in love with his colleague Bharti (Priyanka). But Faizal is unable to gather courage to confess about his affair to Naseem. Meanwhile, Namrata (Jaya Bhattacharya), Faisal's student develops a close friendship with Naseem. When Bharti directly approaches Naseem and tells her the truth, Naseem is very hurt but comes to terms with the facts. Namrata gives her emotional support. Finally does Naseem allow Faizal and Bharti to unite? This episode is also produced by Picasso.	23-04-2000	Jaya Bhattacharya, Navni Parihar, Priyanka, Vaquar Sheikh
107	Ward No. 6	This story Ward Number 6 is about Rajat (Kay Kay Menon) who is a gold medalist in psychiatric medicine. He comes to a small town from Mumbai and stays as a paying guest with an old lady (Meenakshi Thakur). Unlike other doctors in the hospital, he is a doctor with modern ideas who believes that mental patients can be cured too. He comes across a patient named Bhusan, who does not seem mentally ill, but just has a different thought process. Kay Kay takes extra efforts to try and cure him. But all his hard work is severely criticised by his colleagues, even by their senior doctor (Sushil Parashar). Will Kay Kay ever succeed in curing Bhushan or will he succumb to the pressure of his seniors and colleagues?! This episode is also produced by Maiden Films.	30-04-2000	Kay Kay Menon, Meenakshi Thakur, Sushil Parashar
108	Baadal	The story Baadal is about a woman with a psychiatric problem. Kevin D Souza (Rajiv Paul) is a young man who loves nature. His father (Shakti Singh) owns a gym and a club house, but Kevin still loves to jog in the open space. On one such jogging trip, he meets a strange woman named Rachna (Pallavi Joshi) who starts calling him Manu. She begins to talk to Kevin as if she has known him for years. Kevin is nonplussed but plays along. This becomes an everyday affair. Gradually her childish behaviour begins to bother Kevin. He meets Rachana s parents (Harjeet Walia and Kanika Shivpuri) and they tell him the story of her life. She had lost her childhood love in an accident but was unable to accept the truth and began to live in an imaginary world. Hearing all this, Kevin stops meeting her. After about 6 months, a rich man (Deepan Vartak) comes to Kevin s clubhouse with his wife. And the wife turns out to be Rachana herself. On seeing Kevin, Rachana again goes into the imaginary world and loses control over her emotions. Her psychiatrist (Deepak Qazir) comes out with a solution to cure her. He asks Kevin to enact as Manu and pretend to die in an accident in the same way as the real Manu did. Is Kevin willing to help after all the distress he had to go through?! This episode is produced by Two's Company.	07-05-2000	Deepak Qazir, Deepan Vartak, Harjeet Walia, Kanika Shivpuri, Pallavi Joshi, Rajiv Paul, Shakti Singh
109	Kuch Kuch Dil Mein	The story 'Kuch Kuch Dil Mein is a story of love. Sanjay falls in love with Shirley (Sandhali Sinha) who is his best friend Mario s (Ajay Gehi) sister. They begin to like and love each other. But Shirley is suffering from cancer, which Sanjay is not aware of. He fondly considers Shirley his angel. When Sanjay proposes to Shirley for marriage, she reveals to him about her incurable disease. He is devastated and unintentionally utters harsh words to her. He spends a sleepless night and repents for his behaviour. When he reaches Shirley s house to apologise the next day, he is in for a shock!!! This episode is also produced by Picasso.	14-05-2000	Ajay Gehi, Sandhali Sinha
110	Aanchal	Anchal is a story about a mentally challenged boy named 'Balu (Vrajesh Hirjee). His old mother (Meenakshi Thakur) is a widow and a retired government servant for whom her pension is the only source of income. It is very difficult for her to make ends meet. Balu is 40 years old but behaves like a 3-year-old. No organization is willing to admit him due to his age. There comes a time when Balu s mother does not receive pension for two consecutive months. She passes her days by taking favors from others. And she is constantly worried about Balu, as in what would happen to him after her death. Nevertheless, one day while returning home, after borrowing some money from a distant brother (Mithilesh Chaturvedi), she meets with a fatal accident. And Balu is left behind clueless and helpless. This episode is produced by Sangita Sinha's Ananda Film & Tele-communications.	21-05-2000	Meenakshi Thakur, Mithilesh Chaturvedi, Vrajesh Hirjee
111	The Boss	Arun (Darshan Dave) is a B Com Graduate who wants to become a C.A, but circumstances do not permit him to do so. In order to feed himself and his mother, he begins to work as a peon under a strict boss Doraiswamy (Nagesh Bhosle). Doraiswamy keeps insulting him at every step. Arun has a great voice and is very fond of singing. The only one who appreciates his talent, apart from his mother is his office colleague Manju. Manju motivates him to pursue a career in music. Will Arun succeed in doing so and will Doraiswamy ever realize Arun s worth? This episode is also produced by Emotion Picture, This was also produced by Trinity Films Combine.	28-05-2000	Darshan Dave, Nagesh Bhosle
112	Kashish	The story Kashish is about Sameer (R. Madhavan) who is a handsome young flirt. He and his friends (Sanil Sodhi) and (Jaya Bhattacharya) are out on a vacation. But on the way, they see Nandini (Mouli Ganguly) near a motel owned by Madhurima (Nandita Thakur) and they decide to stay at that motel. Nandini is Sameer s ex flame. Sameer is surprised to see that Nandini has a young son Vikram. But Sameer is unable to find out about the child s father. Within a short while, Sameer develops a close bond with Vikram. Nandini is not willing to divulge the mystery of Vikram s father. But when Sameer finds out the truth, he is stunned to know that Vikram s father is none other than he himself. Will Sameer accept the relationship or will he move on with his life?! This episode is also produced by Picasso.	04-06-2000	Jaya Bhattacharya, Madhavan, Mouli Ganguly, Nandita Thakur, Sanil Sodhi
113	Mulaquat	The story Mulaquat is about a station master Lahana Singh (Pawan Malhotra). He lives in a very small town where hardly a train or two stops once in a way. One night, a girl called Tamanna (Shruti Ulfat) and her mother (Abha Dhulia) get down at the station. They want to migrate to Pakistan because of Partition, but are unable to do so due to lack of documents. Like a good Samaritan, Lahana gives them refuge in his house. He and Tamanna start liking each other, but Tamanna has hidden the reality of her life from him. She is actually a courtesan. When she confides in her mother about her feelings, her mother warns that she would never be able to marry him, as it is against their custom. Lahana helps them get their documents for migration. Tamanna leaves with a promise to return and meet him once, before she can breathe her last. Will Lahana wait for her? Does Tamanna keep her promise? This was produced by Rakesh Madhotra's Shikhrit Arts and N.R. Pachisia's Ratan International.	11-06-2000	Abha Dhulia, Pawan Malhotra, Shruti Ulfat
114	Life is beautiful	The story Life is beautiful is a sweet little story of Bhairavi Chauhan (Suchitra Pillai) who is an arrogant business lady. She is a divorcée and always throws her weight around. She has a maid (Pratima Kazmi) at home who looks after all her needs. And the only other person in her life is Gautam (Girish Mallik) who really cares for her and adores her. One day the maid has a little guest over, for a few days. The guest is a little girl Anupama (Tanvee Hegde) who is an orphan. She is very naughty and restless. Initially Bhairavi gets irritated even at the sight of the girl but gradually develops a great liking for her. She even begins to look at life from a different perspective. Will she even begin to reciprocate to Gautam s feelings? This episode is also produced by Clap-Stem.	18-06-2000	Girish Mallik, Pratima Kazm, Suchitra Pillai, Tanvee Hegde
115	Sauda	The story Sauda is an emotional tale about a dilemma of a woman when it comes to choosing between principles and husband. Radha (Himani Shivpuri) is a simple housewife who is living with a belief that her husband is a hard working truck driver who runs the house with his honestly earned money. One night a girl Nanda (Bhairavi Raichura) comes banging at Radha s door. She is running helter-skelter saving herself from some goons who were trying to catch her. Radha gives her refuge for the night. On seeing Radha s husband Chandu s (Jahangir Khan) photo in the bedroom, Nanda shrieks as he was the main goon following her. Hell breaks loose upon Radha when she realizes that her husband is actually a pimp. She rushes to Chandu s accomplice s wife Fatima (Shagufta Ali) in order to warn her about her husband s deeds. But she is surprised to see Fatima s reaction as she already knows the fact. Will Radha save Nanda from Chandu s clutches or will she succumb to her duty as a wife? This episode is produced by Sadhana Chaturvedi's Sach Creations.	25-06-2000	Bhairavi Raichura, Himani Shivpuri, Jahangir Khan, Shagufta Ali
116	Mere Saamne Wali Khidki Mein	Mere Saamne Wali Khidki Mein is a funny story about Rohan (Rohit Bakshi) who is a photographer by profession and comes to stay on rent in a new house. He has a bubbly young lady Lalita (Lovleen Mishra) as a domestic help. There is a window right across Rohan s balcony where he sees a beautiful girl Devika smiling at him. The exchange of smiles and signals goes on. But he notices a peculiar thing about her. He sees that sometimes the girl is very shy and sweet to him and sometimes shows arrogance and makes faces. This confuses Rohan, but he gets more and more eager to meet her. Karry is another guy who also stays in the opposite building. He becomes friendly with Rohan and tells him that the girl he sees in the window is actually a ghost. In this confusion, he gets a note from the girl in the window, admitting her love for him. He fixes a date with her and meets her at a restaurant, where she gives him a different story. She tells Rohan that she is Devika s twin sister Radhika. So what s the real deal? Is Devika a ghost? Does she really have a twin sister? Or is it something else?? This episode is also produced by Iris Productions.	02-07-2000	Lovleen Mishra, Rohit Bakshi
117	Apne Paraye	Apne Paraye is a story about the thin line between relationships. Jay Kumar (Annu Kapur) is an old man whose wife reveals a big secret to him before dying. She tells him that their youngest son Rohan is not really his son but an ex-lover s illegitimate child. Jay suffers a heart attack on hearing this. When Jay recovers from the hospital, there is great change in his behavior. He is rude and cold towards Rohan. But Rohan is very calm and patient. Just for a change, when Jay goes to live with his elder son, he is greatly disappointed with the attitude of his daughter in law. That s when he suffers another attack. Neha (Shweta Keswani), Rohan s fiancée, cares for Jay. Jay confides about Rohan s reality to Neha who in turn tells Rohan about it. Rohan meanwhile gets a job offer from abroad. He meets Jay and tells him that his mother already told him about his reality and that he was ready to go away and settle abroad. He also assures Jay that he would return the moment Jay needs him. Jay is shocked to hear this and realizes that relationships are not just by blood and he stops Rohan from going away. This episode is also produced by Fantasia.	09-07-2000	Annu Kapur, Shweta Keswani
118	Tohfa	Tohfa is an interesting story about an ultra modern lady Moira (Iravati Harshe) who has many vices and lives life on her own terms. Moira is the wife of a rich businessman Ranbeer (Arif Zakaria). Moira would lie to her husband and under the pretext of meeting an old aunt, would go once every month to meet her boyfriend Siddharth (Dipen Vartak). When Siddharth proposes marriage to her, she decides to leave him. Before parting, Siddharth gifts an expensive gold necklace to her. Just to avoid complications, she mortgages it with a jeweller. On returning home, she lies to Ranbeer that her aunt has died and has left a gold necklace for her with the jeweler. Ranbeer says he would pick it up on his way to work. Later that day she eagerly goes to the office to collect the necklace. When Ranbeer presents the necklace to her, she is stunned to see a different and simpler necklace instead. But she gets a bigger shock when she sees Ranbeer s secretary wearing Siddharth s necklace. Will she bear the deceipt silently? This episode is also produced by Maiden Films.	23-07-2000	Arif Zakaria, Dipen Vartak, Iravati Harshe
119	Model Number 59	The story Model Number 59 is about a retired colonel (Raju Kher) who is very attached to his old car. He is disciplined and adamant and extremely possessive about the car. His son and daughter in law try hard to persuade him to get rid of the car, much to the annoyance of the old man. But somehow Colonel is very fond of his grandson Akhil. Colonel visits his son once in a while. On one such trip, Akhil accompanies Colonel on his drive back home. The long trip brings out a strong bonding between Akhil and his grandfather. When Akhil begins to leave, his grandfather asks him to take the car. Finally Colonel parts with his beloved car. This episode is also produced by Picasso.	30-07-2000	Raju Kher
120	Bugs - Bunny	Bugs - Bunny is a very touching story about a young guy Bunny (Vishal Malhotra) who is the hospital since 6 months. Bunny is suffering from gangrene so he is very miserable and pessimistic. Sister Mamta (Meghna Malik) and Dr.Chandru (Shishir Sharma) take good care of him. One day a new patient named Bugs (Hussain Kuwajerwala) is admitted in Bunny's room. Bugs has much life. He is very funny, positive and energetic. Initially Bunny is irritated by Bugs presence and his silly jokes. But gradually Bugs wins his heart and they become best buddies. Bunny and Bugs once see a pretty girl come to the hospital who gives a sweet smile to Bunny and he falls for her. Even after the girl gets discharged, Bugs creates situations where Bunny begins to feel that she is reciprocating to his feelings. Later when he discovers the facts, he becomes annoyed with Bugs. Then Sister Mamta and Dr. Chandru explain to Bunny that Bugs had done all that only to change his outlook towards life. They also tell him that Bugs is suffering from brain tumor and may not survive the operation. Bunny is shattered. Will Bugs win over death and get back to his fun loving self? This episode is also produced by Iris Productions.	30-07-2000	Hussain Kuwajerwala, Vishal Malhotra, Shishir Sharma, Meghna Malik, Tom Alter, Saroj Bhargava, Mangal Kenkre, Bharti Jaffrey, Nilofer Khan, Javed Rizvi, Navaz Hilloowala
121	Ab koi gam nahi...]	Manoj is an army officer, married to Shobha. He has a daughter named Rumjhun. Because of his job, Manoj has to stay away from home for months or even years. So he is never able to spend time with his daughter, as a result of which Runjhun is unable to accept him as her father. Manoj is extremely disappointed and heart broken. Will he able ever be able to make place in his daughter's heart? This episode is produced and directed by Subhankar Ghosh under Subhankar Ghosh Productions and produces alongside Dr. Anil Saxena and Sreemoyee Hazra's Target Communication.	06-08-2000	Narendra Jha
122	Vachan	Vachan is a story about sacrifice and old beliefs. Shiru (Mansi Roy Joshi) is a child widow staying at Yagya's (Jatin Sial) house right from her childhood. Yagya and Shiru love each other but are unable to marry, as widow remarriage was considered taboo in those times. Yagya's family pressurises him to marry. When Shiru compels Yagya to marry, he gives in. His friend Vipin (Ashish Roy Basu) gives him an idea. He asks Yagya to marry a simple girl who would never interfere in his life. So Yagya marries an uneducated orphan girl Putul (Jaya Bhattacharya). Yagya shows no interest in her and within a few days lies to her that there is a fault in her horoscope and if they live together, she ll be a widow within two months. So Putul lives with Yagya's aunt for several months. Unaware of Yagya's plot, Shiru forces him to bring Putul back. Upon her return, Shiru learns of Yagya's deceit and she commits suicide. This episode is also produced by Tarun Mathur's T.M. Productions and AVA Audio-Lab, a division of AVA Entertainment Ltd.	13-08-2000	Ashish Roy Basu, Jatin Sial, Jaya Bhattacharya, Mansi Roy Joshi
123	Bandhan	Bandhan is a story about Tanya (Eva Grover) who is a twenty-year-old girl, when her mother Anita (Smita Jaykar) announces that she is pregnant. Tanya does not mind that she would have a brother who is twenty years younger to her. The child is born in London and is named Manav. When he is about four years old, Tanya's marriage is fixed with a lecturer Rahul (Vaqar). Rahul and his parents are so attached to Manav that Rahul's mother asks Tanya to bring Manav to her marital home after marriage. Manav grows up at Tanya's place. Tanya gives birth to a daughter Rishika who considers Manav an uncle cum brother. Manav even looks after Rahul's business. One day on the occasion of 'Raksha Bandhan, Tanya goes to meet a mysterious lady. On questioning her, Tanya confesses the fact to Manav, that he is not her brother, but her son. Actually she was in love with an air force officer during her college life. But before she could marry him, he became a martyr. She was also pregnant from him and was unwilling to abort the child. So her parents adopted this method to bring the child into the world and not ruin Tanya's reputation. Will the newly revealed fact change the relations? This episode is also produced by Tracinema.	20-08-2000	Eva Grover, Smita Jaykar, Vaqar
124	Disha	Disha is a touching story about a young couple Nandu (Vishal Singh) and Devika who are orphans. They both yearn for parental love as they have never experienced it before. Eventually Devika gets pregnant. One day while returning from a doctor's visit, they come across an old couple (Dr.Daji Bhatwadekar and Sulbha Deshpande) who have been abandoned by their children. Nandu and Devika bring the old couple home and begin to live like a real family. Will the family really continue to live happily in spite of the little ups and downs that life offers?! This episode is also produced in-house by Zee TV.	27-08-2000	Sulbha Deshpande, Vishal Singh
125	Number Please	Number Please is a story about how a bonding can develop between two people who have never met. The backdrop of this story is based on the times of the British Raj. Rajan Aiyar (Parzaan Dastur) is a young boy who lives with his mother Shanti (Mona Ambegaonkar), father who is a government servant and a younger sister. His father has been newly allotted with a telephone. In order to connect to a number, one had to speak to the operator first. When Rajan would playfully pick up the phone, he would hear a lady's sweet voice asking for a number. Rajan grows very fond of the unseen lady whose name was Sweety. One day Rajan's father gets transferred to another city. Rajan leaves with a heavy heart. Years pass by and Rajan grows up to be a young man (Amar Upadhay). Rajan is now working and has been transferred to the same town and allotted the same house where he spent his childhood. He feels very nostalgic on returning to the house and is very pleased to see the same phone still standing intact. He lifts the receiver with the hope of hearing Sweety's voice on the other end. But he learns that Sweety retired a few years back and she died just the previous day. Rajan cries inconsolably for the unnamed relationship. This episode is produced by Mandanlal and Bhagirath Sharma's Sri Shakti Films and Mandira Kashyap's Kshitij Works.	03-09-2000	Amar Upadhay, Mona Ambegaonkar, Parzaan Dastur
126	Yaadein	Yaadein is a story about an old couple (Satyen Kappu and Savita Prabhune) who have a young son Arjun (Rajeev Paul). They get him married to a rich but homely girl Manisha (Sonam Malhotra) who loves and respects Arjun's parents. But unfortunately within a very short span of time, Arjun meets with a fatal accident. Manisha wishes to continue staying with Arjun's parents, but thinking about her future, Arjun's parents decide to get her married. Manisha's father (Shishir Sharma) gets her married to a rich man's (Anant Jog) son. Arjun's old and lonely parents live with old memories. Once, on Arjun's death anniversary they wish to make some charity to the poor through Manisha. When they go to Manisha's home, her father in law refuses to let them meet her. After failed attempts to convince him, Arjun's parents request him to allow them to meet Manisha and her new born child just once and bless them. But the father in law strictly refuses. Will the old couple return disappointed or will their modest desire get fulfilled? This episode is produced by Dinesh Gandhi's Lama Productions.	10-09-2000	Anant Jog, Rajeev Paul, Satyen Kappu, Savita Prabhune, Shishir Sharma, Sonam Malhotra
127	Ganpati Bappa Morya	Ganpati Bappa Morya is a story about a little girl Vinnie who has no mother. Her father Dhaniya (Virendra Saxena) is a poor sculptor who makes idols of Lord Ganesha. Dhaniya has a friend Gotya (Mushtaq Khan) who always drags Dhaniya to a liquor den. Dhaniya does not love Vinnie and considers her a jinx because her mother died while giving birth to her. A neighboring well wisher lady (Sulabha Deshpande) loves and cares for Vinnie. She gradually teaches Vinnie ways of winning her father's heart. And Vinnie succeeds in doing so. One day when Vinnie goes to buy colors for painting an idol, she loses the 100 rupee note which Dhaniya had given her. She sits in a corner and sobs. A childless couple sees her and takes pity on her. They give her 100 rupees and go their way. Even though Vinnie and Dhaniya's relations have improved, Dhaniya still gives in to Gotya's insistence to consume liquor. Suddenly Dhaniya's health collapses and he suffers from liver cirrhosis. Dhaniya's doctor turns out to be the same gentleman who had given the 100 rupees to Vinnie. The doctor and his wife grow so fond of Vinnie that they decide to look after her and her father. This episode is produced by Hemanth Sheth's Behind the Scene and also directed by Tarun Mathur.	17-09-2000	Mushtaq Khan, Sulabha Deshpande, Virendra Saxena
128	Love Hua	Love Hua is a story about a widower Suraj (Sudhanshu Pandey) who also loses his seven-year-old son in an accident. Suraj is unable to get his wife Priya and son Ayush out of his mind and keeps clinging to the past. But Esha (Sucheta Khanna) comes to Suraj's life like a breeze of fresh air. They fall in love and Esha gets pregnant. Suraj offers to marry her but Esha refuses. She wants Suraj to continue living with the memories of his wife and son. Esha delivers a boy and she wants Suraj to name him as Ayush. One night, she suddenly goes away leaving behind a letter. In the letter, she mentions that she had given birth to Ayush only as a punishment to herself because she was the one against whose car Suraj's first son Ayush met with an accident. On reading this, will Suraj forgive Esha and stop her from going away? This episode is also produced by Tracinema.	24-09-2000	Sudhanshu Pandey, Sucheta Khanna
129	I Love My India	I Love My India is a story about Bunty, a young boy who is the son of an ex-army man. Bunty's father is poor and handicapped, and runs a tea stall in Goa. Jenny (Aditi Govitrikar) and Jacob are an NRI couple who come to India every year. They own a farmhouse close to Bunty's home. Jenny and Jacob are childless but they happen to grow extremely fond of Bunty. They even fund his education. Jacob also proposes to adopt Bunty and take him to America. Initially Bunty's parents object but eventually agree for the sake of their son's bright future. Will Bunty too agree to leave his roots behind and go with them? This episode is produced by Suleman and Jaffer Quadri's QB Productions.	01-10-2000	Aditi Govitrikar, Meenakshi Gupta, Kishore Kadam
130	Grace and Glory	Grace and Glory is a story which teaches us how positive attitude can make us look at a brighter side of life, in spite of the biggest of sorrows. Simran (Pamela Mukherjee) is a young handicapped painter who uses a wheelchair. She is very pessimistic and full of self-pity. She has a pen friend named Grace (Suhas Joshi) who is an elder widow and also a painter. After years of communication through letters, Grace invites Simran to stay at her place for a week. She sends Tina (Niki Aneja) to pick her up. Right from the beginning, Simran dislikes Tina and always questions her identity. Grace is a fun loving lady who enjoys her life. Grace is hospitable towards Simran and entertains her as much as she can. At the end of the stay, Simran learns that Grace has cancer and she won't be living for long and that Tina is a member of the Make A Wish foundation and she had lost her fiancé due to brain tumor. This episode is produced by Vipul and Nandita Kothari under VK Films.	08-10-2000	Niki Aneja Walia, Pamela Mukherjee, Suhas Joshi
131	Shikha banegi Dulhan	Shikha is raised by her stern father in such a way that only his word has been deemed final every time. She is asked to go to Mumbai with his friend, Ravi Malhotra (Rajendra Gupta) to see a boy named Karan. Shikha is amazed at the bond of love that exists between Ravi and his family. She later confides to Ravi's daughter, Aditi, that she is terrified of getting married but lacks the guts to say the same to her father. However, Ravi convinces her to at least meet Karan. The two go to a restaurant but Shikha speaks only a few words with Karan. Karan has no choice but to reject the proposal. Ravi informs Shikha's father about it, who orders him to send Shikha back home. Shikha breaks down and tells Ravi's children how her father terrorised her family and her. Ravi goes to Indore and scolds Shikha's father for never smiling or letting his children smile! For always ruling over them with an iron hand! Meanwhile, Aditi urges Shikha to meet Karan again. This time, Shikha and Karan hit off very well. Shikha's family reaches Mumbai to Ravi's house. An elated Shikha returns to Ravi's house and is shocked to see her father. What fate awaits her? This episode is also produced by Pratham Media Entertainment.	15-10-2000	
132	Laadli	Laadli is a little motherless child and is raised by her father. Laadli longs to have a mom and she leaves a note for her favourite teacher Priya (Divya Dutta) asking her to be her mother, but her teacher is taken aback and feels upset. And due to this note, Priya misunderstands Laadli's father, Rahul (Rajat Kapoor). Priya confronts Rahul, but he too is shocked about the note and he apologises to her saying that he will correct his daughter. Laadli falls ill, Rahul and Priya are very concerned about her. But, Rahul had promised his wife before she died, that he will never remarry. Rahul is in a dilemma, about Laadli having a mother and about approaching Priya. Will Rahul ask Priya to be her mother, and will Priya agree for the same? This episode is produced by Ajay-Ajit's SAI Entertainment.	22-10-2000	
133	Kya Yehi Pyaar Hai	Nishit dotes on his brother, Anuj, who is a musician but Anuj leaves home for good. Meanwhile, Nishit falls in love with Jahnvi and confides to her that he longs for Anuj to return home. Jahnvi meets Anuj and learns that he is heartbroken, and has become a drug addict. Nishit goes abroad for work, and that is when Jahnvi tries to change Anuj's life by offering him a musical album. Gradually, Anuj and Jahnvi fall in love. How is Jahnvi going to convey to Nishit about her feelings for his brother? This episode is also produced by Iris Productions.	29-10-2000	Vaishnavi Mahant, Vinay Jain, Prakash Ramchandani
134	Mere Papa	Tina lives in a hostel and refuses to accept any gifts from Mona, her mother, because she is a bar dancer and that is why Tina hates her. She gets upset whenever her friends taunt her about not having a father. Tina meets Mona and asks her who her father is. Mona says that she would not want him to be maligned because he has a family of his own, so she refuses to reveal his name. Meanwhile, in order to show off to her friends, Tina lies that her father will celebrate her birthday with her. On Tina's birthday, her friends decide to follow her, so a worried Tina walks into a restaurant and sits with a stranger named Sanjeev Saxena (Shishir Sharma). She requests him to pretend to be her father and narrates her dilemma to him. Her friends are shocked when Sanjeev invites them to celebrate Tina's birthday. The father-daughter bond between Tina and him strengthens, and Sanjeev tells her one day that he wants to adopt her. When she mentions about her mother to him, he says that he wants not just a daughter but a wife as well. However, is Mona going to give her consent to the relationship? This episode is also produced by Clap-Stem.	05-11-2000	Shishir Sharma, Anita Wahi, Pooja Kanwal, Amardeep Jha
135	Khel Khel Mein	Dr. Abhay Verma (Sumeet Raghavan) has a very serious temperament. Gonsales, his compounder, often tries to make light of matters but in vain. Then, Maria, a fun loving girl and a prankster, comes to his clinic complaining of severe pain. Abhay and Gonsales realise later that she was only playing a prank because of a bet laid with her friend to fool Abhay on 1 April. On returning home, Abhay gets nostalgic about his conversation with his former girlfriend, Shivani. About how she used to lovingly call him a fool because his birthday too fell on 1 April. Meanwhile, Maria continues to play pranks on Abhay regularly for almost a year, and leaves him exasperated every time. Maria gives Gonsales a lift in her car one day and drops him to Abhay's home. She is shocked to see photographs of a girl. Gonsales tells her that Abhay used to love Shivani very much but she had married another, and from then on, laughter had disappeared from his life. Maria stops visiting Abhay's clinic, and he begins to miss her. She comes to his clinic again to give him her wedding card. Abhay is dejected, so declines from attending her wedding. She then invites him for the dress rehearsal. Will Abhay muster the courage to attend it? Will his feelings for Maria ever be known to her? This episode is produced by Encompass ESP.	12-11-2000	Sumeet Raghavan, Gauri Karnik, Rajkumar Kanojia, Dinesh Kaushik
136	Parcel	Shruti (Mandira Bedi) and Nikhil (Sanjay Singh) love each other and have well-established careers, until one day Shruti receives a call from Lieutenant Rawat that she has a parcel. Shruti is stunned to see that her cousin sister, Neha, has left behind her baby. Rawat narrates how Neha and her husband had fallen victims to the bullets of terrorists, and Neha had asked Rawat to entrust Nihraika, her baby, to Shruti. Shruti brings the baby home and is devastated with the news of Neha's death. Nikhil is not too happy about the baby and says that she must concentrate on her career. Shruti's colleague suggests to her to keep Niharika in a cr che. The problems between Shruti and Nikhil only increase everyday, so he warns her to choose between him or the baby. Left with no choice, Shruti decides to give away the baby in an orphanage. Shruti is devastated with her decision. Neha's mother phones Shruti and thanks her for giving her grandchild a new life. Overwhelmed with guilt and grief, Shruti chucks off her job and her love. Shruti brings Niharika home again, where a pleasant surprise awaits her. This episode is produced by Namrata Rungta's Storytellers.	19-11-2000	Mandira Bedi, Sanjay Singh
137	Main Canada jaaonga...	Guddu desires to go to Canada but his father wants him to establish himself in India first. One day, his aunt, Susheela, flaunts the riches that her family possesses because of her son, Naveen, prospering in Canada. Hearing Susheela's taunts, Guddu's father finally agrees to send Guddu to Canada. Guddu's family is excited. However, Guddu's grandmother is devastated. Guddu's father arranges for the visa and flight tickets. Guddu has to leave within the next five days, and everyone in the family feels sad and irritable too. Guddu's father returns home after dropping Guddu to the airport. Everyone is upset, now that Guddu has gone. Will Guddu ever return? This episode is produced by Dilip Sood's Soods Films & Media Ltd.	26-11-2000	
138	Shiksha	Professor R. R. Sinha (Arun Bali) is a man of principles. Despite being a topper, his daughter Swasti (Juhi Parmar) does not succeed getting a job. She feels disappointed that her father does not use his influence to get her a job. One day, after dropping Swasti for an interview, he bumps into Jeevan (Amit Behl), an old student of his. He realises that Jeevan is the owner of the same company for whose interview Swasti has gone. However, Sinha does not say a word. Jeevan gets a phone call then about a contract and he asks his colleague to bribe the officials. Sinha advises him to tread on the correct path. Meanwhile, Sinha's wife accuses her husband of being selfish and unconcerned about Swasti. Jeevan is informed later about having won the contract. Swasti eventually gets a job in Jeevan's company on her own merit, and when he sees her resume, he asks her to take her home. Jeevan expresses his gratitude to Sinha for making him the man he is. This episode is produced by Rohit Lal and Arun Prakash's Imprint Communications.	03-12-2000	Amit Behl as Jeevan, Arun Bali as Professor R.R. Sinha, Juhi Parmar as Swasti Sinha, Neena Cheemaas Usha R.P. Sinha, Kanika Kohli as Swasti's Younger Sister
139	Kya Khoya Kya Paaya	Rajiv and Nandini have completed 25 years of their marriage. Before Rajiv and Nandini married, they had decided to set aside their past relationships on their wedding night, and be committed to their marriage. During the Silver Jubilee celebration, they announce that they are getting divorced. Their children, who have now settled, are shocked to hear their decision. Both go in search of their lost love, only to feel disappointed that they have moved on with their lives. Will Rajiv and Nandini get back together, or will they go ahead with their divorce? This episode is produced by Presa International.	10-12-2000	Shishir Sharma as Rajiv, Smita Jaykar as Nandini, Anil Dhawan as Balraj Khanna, Neelima Azeem, Jayati Bhatia as Neha, Dharam Taneja as Rahul
140	Jeeya Jaaye Naa	Jeeya Jaaye Naa is about Ganga, a mother, (Sulbha Deshpande) who yearns for her son's release from jail. She is sure that her son, Ram, has not committed the murder. So, one day, Ganga puts an advertisement stating that her son is innocent, and anyone helping her would be rewarded Rs. 100,00/- Vijay, a reporter, visits Ganga. She informs Vijay that Ram is innocent and that Ratna, Ram's wife, had taken her son, Krishna, away to her mother's place. Ram narrates to Vijay in jail the chain of events that led him to being held responsible for the murder committed by Lankesh, a man at the club. Vijay befriends Lankesh and takes him to Ganga. Seeing the firm belief of a mother about her son's innocence, he surrenders and pleads guilty. Ram gets released. Ganga pays Vijay the reward money but he refuses. Ratna and Krishna return to Ram. Things take a turn for the worse when Ganga, being an asthmatic, keeps coughing all night, and Krishna tends to her. Ram's wife gets disturbed and irritated, so she orders Ram to send Ganga away. Ram asks Ganga to get admitted at the Home for the Aged. A shattered Ganga asks for her shawl before leaving but is shocked to see it torn into half by Krishna. Why has Krishna done that? This episode is also produced by Zee TV itself.	17-12-2000	Sulbha Deshpande, Master Mukuldutt Sharma as Krishna
141	Jo Kaha Na Jaye	Jo Kaha Na Jaye is a story about Paul (Jiten Lalwani) who falls in love with Sherry, but is unable to express his feelings. Sherry works at a music store and Paul visits the store regularly under some excuse or the other. Being shy in nature, Paul is never able to convey his feelings to her. Sherry too likes Paul and tries to express it through notes hidden in the CDs that he purchases. Paul is not a music lover; hence he fails to see the notes. One day, Sherry snaps at Paul when he again fails to speak his heart out. Paul stops visiting the store. Sherry begins to miss him and goes to his house to meet him. But Sherry is shocked when Paul's mother tells her that he is getting engaged the next day. During the engagement party, when Paul's friends insist on hearing some music, Paul accidentally plays a tape which has Sherry's confession of love for him. Paul is shocked. Now what will Paul decide? This episode is also produced by Pratham Media Entertainment.	24-12-2000	Jiten Lalwani
142	Aank Micholi	Aank Maicholi is a story about two paying guests who are unaware that they are staying in the same room. Anu (Shwetra Kavatra) and Rohan Pandey (Kumud Mishra) work in the same office but Anu works in the day, while Rohan works at night. So their greedy landlord rents the room to them according to their timings when one doesn't come face to face with the other. Anu and Rohan gradually fall in love with each other at their work place. Anu gets a letter from a father regarding a marriage proposal. At the same time, Rohan too gets a letter from his father about an alliance. Rohan is elated when he realizes that the girl his father has chosen is none other than Anu herself. But the story takes a twist, when Rohan's father calls him saying that he wants to cancel Anu's alliance since he has found out that Anu is living with a man. Rohan is shocked and confronts Anu. Anu is equally shocked to hear this rumor. Will Anu and Rohan be able to unite? This episode is also produced by Tracinema.	04-01-2001	Kumud Mishra, Shwetra Kavatra
143	Intezaar	Intezaar is a heart wrenching story about a dying man Mr. Kaul (Ravindra Mankani) whose last wish is to meet his son Arjun who works for the Army. An army officer comes to his bedside. Kaul assumes the officer to be his son Arjun and apologises to him for being a bad father. Kaul recalls how his wife had left him because she was not willing to adjust with his low income. But young Arjun had assumed that he had driven his mother out of the house. So Arjun hated his father and always disrespected him. Soon thereafter, Kaul breathes his last. The doctor at the hospital is shocked when the officer tells him that he is not Kaul's son, but a colleague with the same name. He came on behalf of Arjun because Arjun was ungrateful and refused to come to meet his dying father. This episode is produced by Sandeep Shrivastava's Wisdom Tree Productions and Moon Crest Productions.	11-01-2001	Ravindra Mankani
144	Shagun	Shagun is a touching story about a small boy named Shagun (Yash Pathak) whose parents are divorced. Shagun lives with his mother (Nivedita Bhattacharya) and visits his father (Harsh Chhaya) every weekend. Shagun's mother aspires to become an actress and indulges into all kinds of vices including drugs. Her friends regularly come to her house for rave parties and Shagun often gets neglected. Shagun hears from his friends and teacher about the negative impacts of drugs. Shagun informs a police inspector who stays in his father's society, about his mother's drug transactions. But he requests the inspector to spare his mother. Unfortunately for Shagun, the police arrest Shagun's mother too along with the others. Later when she is released from jail, she apologises to Shagun for her past behaviour. This episode is produced by Dhilin Mehta's Shri Ashtavinayak Cine Vision and Sanjivan Lal's Lumiere Films.	18-01-2001	Harsh Chhaya, Nivedita Bhattacharya, Yash Pathak
145	Milan	Milan is a story about sacrifice in love. Professor Prem Dixit (Rajat Kapoor) is a widower and has a daughter named Priti. A widow Sudha Dixit (Navni Parihar) and her son Sahil (Sharokh Bharucha) come to stay in the same building. Prem and Sudha have singlehandedly raised their respective children with love and care. But there has always been something amiss in their lives. As time passes by, both the families become acquainted with each other. But destiny plays a strange game when Prem becomes attracted towards Sudha whereas Priti and Sahil too fall in love with each other. Will the younger generation sacrifice its love for the happiness of their parents? This episode is also produced by Ajay-Ajit's SAI Entertainment	25-01-2001	Rajat Kapoor, Sharokh Bharucha
146	Jitne door utne paas	Jitne Door Utne Paas is a story about a couple Anil (Jatin Sial) and Aparna (Kamia Malhotra). Anil and Aparna fall in love with each other and marry. Seven years pass by, but the love they shared once upon a time, gradually turns into bitterness. Their dislike towards each other grows to such an extent that they decide to take a divorce. On approaching the court, the judge grants them a period of six months before making a final decision. But Anil's elder brother and his wife advise them to give their marriage another chance by staying together for six months rather than away from each other. Anil and Aparna agree after a little hesitation. As the six months pass by, they begin to realize that they have been taking each other granted all these years. They revisit the places where they used to spend time during their courtship. This episode is also produced by Pratham Media Entertainment.	01-02-2001	Jatin Sial, Kamia Malhotra
147	Pyar hai	Pyar hai is a touching love story of Rashmi. Rashmi is handicapped and walks with the help of crutches. She runs a gift shop. One day, her best friend Farah introduces her to one of her colleagues Abhishek. Though Abhishek is a flirt by nature, he genuinely compliments Rashmi for her good looks. Abhishek frequently visits Rashmi's shop for buying gifts and cards for his girlfriends. Gradually Rashmi begins to fall in love with Abhishek but is unable to express her feelings. One day, a girl named Nainika comes to Rashmi's shop and claims to be a special friend of Abhishek. Nainika's words compel Rashmi to assume that Abhishek is in love with Nainika and will propose to her on Valentine's Day. Will Rashmi be ever able to win over Abhishek's love? This episode is also produced by Dilip Sood's Soods Films & Media Ltd., but this time Dilip is produced alongside his brother Sunil Sood.	08-02-2001	
148	The Lucky Teddy Bear	The Lucky Teddy Bear is a story about a little girl Sharon who goes through an emotional turmoil when she faces humiliation from other children of her age. Sharon's mother (Sucheta Pawse) is a widow but tries to give a decent lifestyle to her only daughter. She sends Sharon to an expensive school where children from rich families come to study. Children at school make fun of her due to her financial status. Sharon feels disturbed and wants to find a way to make friends. She decides to organize a party for her school mates on the occasion of her birthday. She eagerly invites her classmates, but is disappointed when no one turns up. However, Sharon is surprised when her grandmother (Anita Kanwal) comes from Goa. Her grandmother gives her a special gift, a magical teddy bear. Sharon's grandmother tells her that the teddy bear will help her fulfill her wishes if she keeps faith that all her dreams will come true and if she makes a little extra effort. And Sharon's dreams indeed begin to come true. Is grandma's teddy bear really magical? This episode is also produced by Lama Productions.	15-02-2001	Anita Kanwal, Sucheta Pawse
149	Naata	Naata Suman (Juhi Parmar) and Rajan (Anupam Bhattacharya) are happily married for five years. But only thing lacking in their life is a child. Rajan's mother keeps taunting Suman for this. Suman feels dejected as Rajan's mother decides to get Rajan married to someone else. Suman and Rajan love each other unconditionally and Rajan refuses to remarry. Suddenly one day Suman and Rajan's world comes crashing down as Suman gets raped by an unidentified person. Rajan stands by Suman but gets shocked when he finds out that Suman is pregnant. Rajan asks Suman to abort the child. But Suman asks him to reconsider his decision. Suman gives birth to a baby boy and names him Sumit. Sumit yearns for Rajan's love but Rajan never reciprocates. One day the same person who had raped Suman, kidnaps Sumit. After Sumit gets kidnapped, Rajan begins to miss him terribly and realizes his love towards him. Rajan pays the ransom and saves Sumit. Rajan is stunned when he discovers the truth about Sumit. This episode is produced by Afzal Ahmed's Lodi Films International.	22-02-2001	Anupam Bhattacharya, Juhi Parmar
150	Ek Nayee Subah	Ek Nayee Subah is a story of people residing in a housing society named Shanti Niwas . Shanti Niwas means the house of peace but contrary to the name, the residents regularly quarrel with each other. Husain (Murli Sharma) who has lost his entire family in the unrest of Kashmir now works as a watchman at Shanti Niwas. Some society members humiliate Husain while some behave politely with him. Husain is very fond of the kids of the society. One night an earthquake takes place which completely destroys Shanti Niwas. All the residents of Shanti Niwas come together and help each other in this time of crisis. Husain too helps in every possible way. A natural calamity makes the residents of Shanti Niwas realize the importance of unity. This episode is produced by Felix Sequeira's Prima Roma Films.	01-03-2001	Murli Sharma
151	Rang	It is Holi (The festival of colours) and Vinati (Sangeeta Ghosh) is enjoying herself with her husband Vivek (Yash Tonk). Their best friend, Prashant (Ravi Gosain), hates playing with colours but Vinati manages to drag him also in their celebrations. Vivek and Vinati share a few romantic moments. Prashant then drags Vivek to meet their friends. They go on a motorbike and meet with an accident. Vivek dies in the mishap. Vinati blames Prashant for Vivek's death. Years pass by, but Vinati continues to hold a grudge against Prashant. However, Vinati's son, Rahul, enjoys Prashant's company but she warns Rahul not to meet Prashant again. Vivek's sister, Rashmi, suggests to her mother to get Prashant married to Vinati. Vinati gets furious with her and refuses. It is Holi again. Rashmi reminds Prashant about Vivek's dying wish to see him married to Vinati. Prashant throws colour on Vinati, and she gets furious with him. She accuses him of being a murderer! An upset Prashant goes away on his motorbike and meets with a fatal accident. Is Prashant also going to meet a similar fate as Vivek? This episode is also produced by Pratham Media Entertainment.	08-03-2001	Ravi Gossain as Prashant, Sangeeta Ghosh as Vinati, Yash Tonk as Vivek
152	Sweeekar – The Acceptance	Sweekar, (The Acceptance) is dedicated to people suffering from AIDS. Nikki (Meenaksi Gupta) and her husband Karan (Sudhanshu Pandey) are a happily married couple. Nikki and Karan earn their living by doing shows in various cities. Karan also does social work. One day, Karan undergoes a routine blood test before a foreign trip. But he is shocked to find out from his reports that he is suffering from AIDS. Nikki is shattered when she learns of it, but she suspects that Karan has been unfaithful to her. Nikki even leaves him and goes to stay with her aunt (Rameshwari). She quits her current profession and becomes a counselor at a social organisation. A few weeks later, she learns that Karan got AIDS during a blood donation, due to a doctor's negligence. She repents her mistake and rushes to Karan to give him all the possible support and love. This episode is produced by Runima Borah Tandon's Kultur Kraft.	18-03-2001	Meenaksi Gupta, Rameshwari, Sudhanshu Pandey
153	Lamhein	The story of Lamhein revolves around a Home for the Aged where old people abandoned come for shelter. The nun in charge is unable to deal with the chaos and ordeals of the elderly. Despite advertising for a caretaker many times, she doesn t succeed in finding one. Finally, hope arrives in the form of a young man, Vidhant (Vinay Jain). He takes the elderly under his wing, bringing joy and cheer in their lives. However, they get the shock of their lives when they learn that he is battling cancer in its last stage. But before breathing his last, he extracts a promise from them to be always united and happy. To live their life to the fullest! This episode is produced by Manmeet Singh and Bobby Bhosle's Vatsala Creations.	24-03-2001	Vinay Jain
154	Nirmala	Nirmala is a young maid who works in the home of a middle aged couple, Radha (Sulbha Deshpande) and Kishore (Yusuf Hussain). Nirmala comes in place of the older maid who goes on leave. She does all the chores perfectly and even entices Kishore while doing it! Radha feels insecure about her husband when Nirmala is around. Radha notices the change of attitude in her husband, and how he flirts with Nirmala. Nirmala is a nightmare and a threat to Radha's marriage, so one fine day, Radha tells her husband that she would do all the chores from now on, and she doesn't need a maid. Soon, Radha's earlier maid returns. But what happens to Nirmala? This episode is produced by Kanta Sukhdev and directed by her sister Shabnam Sukhdev.	01-04-2001	Sulbha Deshpande, Yusuf Hussain
155	Zameer	Rohit Verma (Manish Goel) comes to Mumbai, the city of dreams. His dream is to become a big movie star but fate wills otherwise, and he is robbed of all his belongings. But Ram Kali (Murli Sharma), a eunuch, enters his life like a blessing. Ram Kali offers him shelter and looks after him. Rohit is not able to achieve any success in entering the film industry, so Ram Kali requests a director to give Rohit a break in his film. However, Rohit is not aware that Ram Kali has recommended his name. Lady Luck smiles at Rohit, and he turns into a popular star. However, he soon forgets Ram Kali. An ailing Ram Kali longs to meet Rohit but Rohit isn't bothered. One day, Rohit gets stuck in a traffic jam and learns from his driver that a eunuch died. Rohit curses. The director gets angry and reveals to Rohit that Ram Kali was the person responsible for his success. Will Rohit's conscience waken at least now? This episode is produced by Deepak Tijori's Tijori Inc. Films and produced in association with Manoj Mehta and Rajendra S. Jolly's Jai Arts.	08-04-2001	Manish Goel as Rohit Verma, Murli Sharma as Ram Kali
156	Izzat ka Falooda	Pappu Pardesi (Dilip Joshi) is a dreaded gangster who gets paid to kill people. However, there are certain principles he adheres to, and he does not spare anyone who messes with his honour. His men and he are worried about their business dwindling because of Pappu's principles. One day, Rakesh (Amit Behl) visits Pappu and gives him money to get his wife killed. Seema (Ashwini Pande) also visits him and gives him money to get someone killed. Pappu delegates the job to two of his men but they return to inform him that Rakesh and Seema are a couple! A distressed Pappu decides to talk to them separately and solve the matter. But Rakesh and Seema refuse to reveal any personal details and warn him to just kill. Pappu's man, Chikna (Jatin Sial), volunteers to kill Rakesh and Seema so that Pappu's principles remain intact. Pappu gets furious and warns Chikna not to accompany him on field anymore. Pappu's men decide that it is time to rebel. Meanwhile, Pappu has yet another meeting with Rakesh and Seema separately. Each of them confides to him the problem with their spouse. Pappu falls into a bigger dilemma when he learns that Seema is pregnant. Left with no choice, he calls Seema and Rakesh together and asks them to shoot each other. Will they kill each other and keep Pappu's honour intact? This episode is also produced by Fantasia.	15-04-2001	Amit Behl, Ashwini Pande, Dilip Joshi, Jatin Sial
157	Top floor se ground floor tak	Ravi Bhatnagar (Rituraj Singh) is a married man working in a bank and is to meet Anu (Sweta Keswani). Anu is pregnant and tells Ravi that she will not abort the child. Ravi and Anu meet are not able to fathom who the old man with them was, on Saturday night. Both recall that fateful night. Ravi's wife, Aditi, nags him about forgetting to pick her from the bank as they had to attend a wedding, so Ravi rushes to the bank. Roshan (Murli Sharma) is instructed by his accomplices to loot a bank. Anu is pregnant with her boyfriend Rahul's baby and he asks her to abort it. Anu goes to a nursing home to abort it. Sakshi (Kuljeet Randhawa) wants to go to Tina Films office. Ravi, Roshan, Sakshi and Anu enter the lift of the 32 storeyed commercial building. Just when the door is about to shut, an elderly man (Tom Alter) enters. The elevator breaks down after a while, and all five of them get trapped. Matters worsen when two cables of the elevator get snapped and remains suspended with the remaining two cables. While they are near the jaws of death, the elder man tells each of them their shortcomings and makes them realise their follies. Who is this elder man getting philosophical with them? And, will they be able to escape out alive? This episode is produced by Nitin and Vaishali Chandrachud's Quarter Inch Productions.	22-04-2001	Kuljeet Randhawa, Murli Sharma, Rituraj Singh, Sweta Keswani, Tom Alter
158	Poorab aur Pashchim	Poorab aur Pashchim is about two school teachers, Shastri and Tanuja (Rajit Kapur and Kitu Gidwani, respectively), from different cultures. Shastri, a firm and strict teacher, insists that students speak only in Hindi, whereas Tanuja is westernised. Both have disagreements and dislike each other. Tanuja falls ill and Shastri begins to miss her. He visits her and treats her with herbal medicines. Everyone at school is shocked with the new development. The principal, with the help of the school inmates, plans a blind date for them, followed by a surprise. Will their plan to bring the two teachers together succeed? This episode is produced by Rajeev Bhatia's V.R. Entertainers alongside his other members A.K. and Vandana Bhatia.	29-04-2001	Kitu Gidwani, Rajit Kapur
159	Umeed	Umeed is about Rakesh, a soldier, who is in love with Sudarshana. They ve been barely married for a while, when he is asked to report on duty. She encourages him to leave, although with a heavy heart. Soon, she gets pregnant. She waits in anticipation to give him the good news, as well as a sweater that she has knitted. But man proposes and God disposes! Rakesh never returns from the warfront. She gives birth to a son, Rajesh, whom she feels is meant to join the army. In memory of her husband, she hands him the army cap and bids him adieu. This episode is also produced by Tracinema and produced in association with Jasmin Bhogilal Shah's Transmedia Software Limited.	06-05-2001	
160	My Family	My Family is about Kajal (Renuka Shahane), a single parent to her son Varun (Dastur Parzan), and they love each other. Her friend Dipti (Loveleen Mishra) introduces her friend Rohit (Sudanshu Pandey) to Kajal, who is already in love with her. Kajal is reluctant to entertain a man in the house because of Varun's insecure feelings. Rohit somehow tries to befriend Varun, but does not succeed. Varun is very possessive about his mother and does not like the idea of sharing her with Rohit. Kajal forbids Rohit from coming home although she is in love with him. Rohit comes to bid them goodbye but he has a surprise in store! This episode is produced by Mukesh Bhatt's Vishesh Films.	13-05-2001	Dastur Parzan, Renuka Shahane, Sudhanshu Pandey
161	Zara Si Zindagi	Zara Si Zindagi is about Arjun (Anup Soni) and Sonam (Sonam Malhotra) who are going to be parents soon. Arjun had left his father's house long back due to many differences. Sonam pleads with him to reunite with his father. However, Arjun remains adamant. When Arjun's own baby is born, he begins to recall his past as a little child. His father's friend makes him realise how much his father still loves him. Will Arjun make amends with his father?. This episode is produced by Arif Shamsi's Moving Spell Telefilms alongside Manish Trehan and Siddharth Randeria.	20-05-2001	Anup Soni as Arjun, Sonam Malhotra as Sonam, Arun Bali, Vikas Anand as Arjun's Father, Arun Bali as Kishan Sharma, Meenakshi Verma as Arjun's Mother
162	Apne Paraye	This episode is also produced by Vivek Bahl's White Cloud.	27-05-2001	
163	Phoolon ke Rang se	Kiran is shattered when her relationship ends, but her mother (Anju Mahendroo) helps her get out of the trauma. And it is her childhood friend, Vivek, (Varun Badola) who brings the smile back on her face by always bringing her flowers. Vivek and Kiran fall in love and marry. Soon, Vivek gets busy with work and Kiran stops receiving the flowers. She feels unloved and speaks to her mother about it. What does her mother suggest? Will Kiran get the romance back in her life? This episode is produced by Harvinder Singh and Rajan Desai's Aryan Vision.	03-06-2001	Anju Mahendroo, Varun Badola
164	Chupke Chupke	Shekhar has left the custody of his three children to their governess, Ms. Komal, who is a very stern lady and an absolute disciplinarian. Their neighbour, Rohini (Rohini Hattangadi) tries to befriend the children but is turned away by both Shekhar and Ms. Komal. With her friend, Madhuri's help, Rohini plans a way to get both Shekhar and Ms. Komal out of the way so that she can be friends with the children. But for how long will this charade last? This episode is also produced by Suchitra, Anand and Ravi Raisinghani's Film Shoppe, a division of Suchitra Home Entertainment.	10-06-2001	Rohini Hattangadi
165	Maa	Maa is about Shikha, a stepmother who is trying her best to be a good mother to Rachna and Suraj. But their biological mother, Anjali, (Mandeep) a divorcée, tries to brainwash the kids against Shikha. Shikha takes great care and pleases the kids in every possible way. However, whenever the kids go to spend their weekend with Anjali, their attitude changes. Shikha feels dejected, so her husband (Sudhir Mitoo) consoles her not to lose courage. Meanwhile, Anjali's conscience tells her that she is a loser and an unfit mother. What decision will Anjali finally take? This episode is also produced by Pratham Media Entertainment.	17-06-2001	Mandeep, Sudhir Mitoo
166	Puppy Love	Puppy Love is about Winni (Pooja Kanwal), an only child, who is raised by a single mother (Prajakti Deshmukh). Winni's friend, Meghna, has to go on a vacation but she has no one to take care of her dog Appy. Winni wants to help Meghna but her mother is not fond of dogs. Winni brings Appy home on the sly, and takes good care of it. When her mother learns the truth, she is upset. Winni expresses her loneliness to her mother. Winni's mother has a surprise for her. Will this make Winni happy? This episode is also produced by Suchitra, Anand and Ravi Raisinghani's Suchitra Home Entertainment.	24-06-2001	Pooja Kanwal, Prajakti Deshmukh
