= Delnaz =

Delnaz is a feminine Indian Parsi name meaning "loved of the heart". Many variations in the spelling of the name such as Dilnaz, Delnaaz, etc. exist but the pronunciation is the same.

== People named Delnaz ==
- Delnaaz Irani - Indian Actress
- Dilnaz Akhmadieva - Kazakhastani Actress and pop singer
- Dilnaz Irani- Indian Actress
- Delnaaz Irani - Indian-Australian Journalist
