= Ashiesh Roy =

Indian actor (1965–2020)

- Born: 18 May 1965
- Died: 24 November 2020 (aged 55); Mumbai, India
- Occupations: Actor; Voice actor
- Years active: 1996–2017

Ashiesh Roy (18 May 1965 – 24 November 2020) was an Indian television and film actor.

== Filmography ==
=== Television ===
Year	Serial	Role	Channel	Notes	Ref.
1997	Byomkesh Bakshi (Episode: Veni Sanhar)	Makrand	DD National	credited as Ashish Roy	
1997-98	Ghar Jamai	Girdhari	Zee TV		
1997–99	Banegi Apni Baat	Abhishek	DD National	by DJ's A Creative Unit	
1998-1999	Dam Dama Dam	Various characters	Zee TV		
1998–99	Movers & Shakers		Sony TV		
1998–99	Daayre			by Anjum Rizvi	
1999–2000	Yes Boss	Tanveer	SAB TV		
2002-2004	Shaka Laka Boom Boom	Partho's Father	Star Plus		
2004	Remix	Mr. Choudhary	STAR One		
2005	Hari Mirchi Lal Mirchi	Tutun	DD National	by Anil Choudhary	
2006–08	Aek Chabhi Hai Padoss Mein	Saurabh Ghosh	Star Plus		
2006	Baa Bahu Aur Baby		Star Plus	by Hats Off Productions	
2007–08	Chaldi Da Naam Gaddi	Das Gupta	Zee TV	by Hats Off Productions	
2009	Burey Bhi Hum Bhale Bhi Hum	Mansukh Popat	Star Plus	by Hats Off Productions	
2010–11	Mrs. & Mr. Sharma Allahabadwale	Anna	SAB TV		
2011–12	Sasural Simar Ka	Suryendra Daddoji Bharadwaj	Colors TV	by Rashmi Sharma	
2012–14	Jeannie Aur Juju	Chatur Ganguli	SAB TV		
2014	Tu Mere Agal Bagal Hai	Various Characters	SAB TV		
2015	Goldie Ahuja Matric Pass	Professor Ganguly	Disney Channel India	by Bad Company	
2015	Mere Angne Mein	Ashok	Star Plus	by Sphere Origins	
2016-17	Kuch Rang Pyar Ke Aise Bhi	Shankar Mandal	Sony TV	by Inspire Films	
2017	Aarambh	Maaran Dev	Star Plus	by Rose Audio Visuals	

=== Movies ===
Year	Film	Role	Notes
2004	Netaji Subhas Chandra Bose: The Forgotten Hero	Spy Police 2	by Shyam Benegal
2005	Home Delivery	Mr. Boltu	
2007	MP3: Mera Pehla Pehla Pyaar	Chief Official at Indian Embassy	
2014	Raja Natwarlal	Kashi	
2014	Barkhaa	Anna	by Shadaab Mirza

== Dubbing career ==
Ashiesh Roy was also a voice actor who has been dubbing for foreign films.

== Dubbing roles ==
=== Live action films ===
Film title	Actor	Character	Dub Language	Original Language	Original Year Release	Dub Year Release	Notes
Superman Returns	Kevin Spacey	Lex Luthor	Hindi	English	2006	2006	Performed with Damandeep Singh Baggan who voiced Brandon Routh as Clark Kent / Superman in Hindi.
The Dark Knight	Heath Ledger	The Joker	Hindi	English	2008	2008	
Man of Steel	Michael Shannon	General Zod	Hindi	English	2013	2013	Performed with Urvi Ashar who voiced Amy Adams as Lois Lane, Shakti Singh who voiced Russell Crowe as Jor-El in Hindi.
Guardians of the Galaxy	Bradley Cooper	Rocket (voice)	Hindi	English	2014	2014	Ninad Kamat dubbed this role in next movies.
RoboCop	Gary Oldman	Dr. Dennett Norton	Hindi	English	2014	2014	Performed alongside Aaditya Raj Sharma who voiced Joel Kinnaman as Alex Murphy / Robocop, Samay Raj Thakkar who voiced Michael Keaton as Raymond Sellers, Vinod Kulkarni who voiced Patrick Garrow as Antoine Vallon, Mayur Vyas who voiced Michael K. Williams as Jack Lewis, Manoj Pandey who voiced Jackie Earle Haley as Rick Mattox and Amar Babaria who voiced K.C. Collins as Andre Daniels in Hindi.
The Legend of Tarzan	Christoph Waltz	Captain Léon Rom	Hindi	English	2016	2016	Performed along with Sanket Mhatre who voiced Alexander Skarsgård as Tarzan / John Clayton III, Lord Greystoke in Hindi.

=== Animated films ===
Film title	Original Voice	Character	Dub Language	Original Language	Original Year Release	Dub Year Release	Notes
Bolt	James Lipton	The Director	Hindi	English	2008	2008	

== Death ==
Ashiesh Roy died on November 24, 2020, due to kidney failure.
