= Delnaaz Irani =

Indian actress (born 1971)

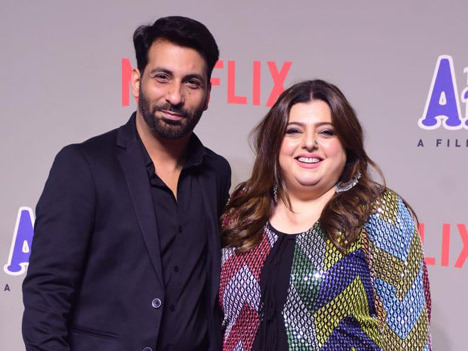
- Irani with her partner Percy Karkaria in 2023
- Other name: Delnaaz Paul
- Occupation: Actress
- Spouse: Rajeev Paul (m. 1998; div. 2012)
- Partner: Percy Karkaria (2012—present)
- Relatives: Bakhtiyaar Irani (brother), Tannaz Irani (sister-in-law)

Delnaaz Irani is an Indian actress. She is known for her role of Kavita Vinod Verma in Yes Boss and Jaspreet "Sweetu" Kapoor in Kal Ho Naa Ho. Irani also participated in Nach Baliye 1 and Bigg Boss 6.

== Career ==
Delnaaz debuted in Baba Sehgal's music video "Ga Ga Ga Gori Gori" in the early 1990s. Her debut television project was the show Commander in 1992. In 1999 she played the role of Kavita Vinod Verma in sitcom Yes Boss. She later acted in several comic roles in films like Kal Ho Naa Ho (2003). Irani participated in Nach Baliye, a reality dance show with then husband, Rajeev Paul. She was a contestant in Bigg Boss 6 and got evicted on the 93rd day. She participated in Power Couple with Percy Karkaria as her partner. However, they were eliminated and failed to reach the final.

== Personal life ==
Delnaaz met TV actor Rajeev Paul on the sets of television series Parivartan in 1993. The couple got married in 1998 and got separated in 2010 after 12 years of marriage. Their divorced was granted in 2012. The two were participants on the reality TV series Bigg Boss 6.

Delnaaz has been with her partner, Percy Karkaria, since 2012.

== Filmography ==
=== Films ===
Year	Title	Role	Ref.
1999	C.I.D.	Bela	
2003	Kal Ho Naa Ho	Jaspreet "Sweetu" Kapoor	
2004	Dil Ne Jise Apna Kahaa	Dhillon	
2005	Pyaar Mein Twist	Dolly	
2006	Humko Deewana Kar Gaye	Tanya Berry	
2007	Showbiz		
2008	Bhoothnath	Mrs. Jojo	
2008	Khallbali: Fun Unlimited	Bipasha	
2009	Paying Guests	Sweety	
2010	Milenge Milenge	Honey	
2010	Toonpur Ka Superrhero	Ramola	
2011	Ra.One	Teacher	
2012	Kyaa Super Kool Hain Hum	Mrs. Dev	
2012	I M 24		
2018	My Mother's Wedding	Parinaaz	
2020	Virgin Bhanupriya	Tarot Card Reader	
2023	The Archies	Pam	

=== Television ===
Year	Serial	Role	Ref.
1992	Commander		
1993–1994	Parivartan		
1999–2002	Ek Mahal Ho Sapno Ka		
1999–2009	Yes Boss	Kavita Vinod Verma	
2004	Hum Sab Baraati	Harsha	
2005–2006	Sanya	Tanaaz Gupta	
2005	Batliwala House No. 43	Gulshan Batliwala	
2005	Son Pari	Pari Sitara	
2005	Nach Baliye 1	Contestant	
2006	Shararat	Preetika	
2007	Karam Apnaa Apnaa		
2007	Baa Bahoo Aur Baby	Zenobia	
2007	Mere Apne		
2008	Zara Nachke Dikha 1	Contestant	
2009	Hans Baliye	Contestant	
2010	Kya Mast Hai Life	Mrs. Zarina Khan	
2010	Ring Wrong Ring	Bindoo	
2011	Filmy Daba Party	Host/presenter	
2012–2013	Kya Huaa Tera Vaada	Pammi Suri	
2012–2013	Bigg Boss 6	Contestant	
2013	Comedy Circus	Contestant	
2013	Welcome – Baazi Mehmaan Nawazi Ki	Contestant	
2013–2014	Kehta Hai Dil Jee Le Zara	Dilshad (Dilz)	
2014–2016	Akbar Birbal	Jodha Bai	
2014–2016	Jamai Raja	Resham Kesar Patel	
2015–2016	Power Couple	Contestant	
2017–2018	Ek Deewaana Tha	Odhni	
2018	Partners Trouble Ho Gayi Double	Shanno	
2020	Choti Sarrdaarni	Mrs. Martha	
2022	Kabhi Kabhie Ittefaq Sey	Kiran (Goli) Kulshrestha	
2023	The Kapil Sharma Show	Begum	
2025	Mannat – Har Khushi Paane Ki	Harneet Singh	
2026	Hui Gumm Yaadein Ek Doctor, Do Zindagiyaan	Chandni Khanna	
2026	Chumbak	Gulshan Tarapurwala	

== Theatre ==
In 2018, Delnaaz Irani appeared in the comedy play Wrong Number alongside Rahul Bhuchar and Rakesh Bedi. The play was directed by Raman Kumar and produced by Rahul Bhuchar under Felicity Theatre, and was staged in several Indian cities.

In 2019, she appeared in the stage play Hello Zindagi, directed by Raman Kumar and produced by Rahul Bhuchar under Felicity Theatre.

== See also ==
- List of Indian film actresses
