= Yes Boss (TV series) =

Indian sitcom television series

- Written by: Ashok Patole
- Directed by: Rajan Waghdhare
- Starring: See below
- Theme music composer: Ashok Patki
- Country of origin: India
- Original language: Hindi
- No. of seasons: 1
- No. of episodes: 631

Production
- Producer: Sri Adhikari Brothers

Original release
- Network: SAB TV
- Release: 23 April 1999 – 31 July 2009

Yes Boss is an Indian sitcom which aired on Sony SAB from 23 April 1999 to 31 July 2009.

== Plot ==
Meera and Mohan Srivastava are married, have a child named Bittu (only shown in the first few episodes) and working in the Adcraft Ad Agency. Husband Mohan is the Junior creative visualizer and his wife is creative director of Adcraft Ad Agency.

Their MD Vinod Verma arrives and they have not disclosed their relationship to their boss who does not miss any chance of flirting with Meera. Mohan hates it and spends most of his time protecting his wife from Mr. Verma. Vinod thinks that Meera is married to an elderly man named Bunty-Ji, who is Mohan himself disguised as an old man, partly to irritate Vinod. Vinod is irritated with wife Kavita and he doesn't like the friendship of his wife Kavita and his employee Mohan.

== Cast and characters ==
=== Main ===
- Aasif Sheikh as Vinod Verma:
  - Kavita's husband, Adcraft Ad Agency's Md, Meera and Mohan's boss
- Rakesh Bedi as Mohan Srivastava:
  - Meera's husband, Vinod's employee in the Adcraft ad agency who holds the post of junior creative visualizer, Bittu's father, Kavita's friend Bunty Srivastava; Meera's husband in front of their boss Vinod
- Kavita Kapoor (1999–2007: 2007–2009) as Meera Srivastava:
  - Mohan's wife and his boss in the office, Creative Director of the Adcraft ad agency and Vinod's employee, Bittu's mother
    - Sonia Kapoor as Meera Srivastava (2007): Kapoor replaced (Kavita Kapoor) for few episodes.

=== Recurring ===
- Delnaaz Paul (1999–2004; 2007–2009) as Kavita Vinod Verma; Vinod's wife
- Ritu Kambow (2004–2005) as Kavita Vinod Verma, replaced Irani in 2004.
- Bhairavi Raichura (2005–2007) as Kavita Vinod Verma; replaced Kambow in 2005.
- Sulbha Arya as Savitri / Rampyaari, Sasu Maa, Mohan's mother-in-law, Meera's mother, Bittu's grandmother, Vinod and Kavita's Aunt
- Parul Yadav as Lucky
- Nigaar Khan as Angelina Madam, Boss of Hot News
- Priya Wal as Princess Imarti
- Hema Diwan as Mawsiji
- Sharad Vyas as Lacchu Patel; VP of the Adcraft ad agency
- Sheetal Agashe as Sheetal, Verma Ji's PA, employee at the Adcraft ad agency
- Bharat Kamwani as Bharat; Mohan's PA, employee in Adcraft ad agency
- Ashiesh Roy as Tanveer, copywriter in the Adcraft ad agency office
- Jaywant Wadkar as Saddu, the Peon in the office
- Neeta S Chawla as Nita; Bharat's PA
- Sargam Gupta as Hiroo
- Savita Malpekar as Vinod Verma's mother, Kavita's mother in law and Meera and Mohan's aunt .
- Nilesh Divekar as Chai wala Vijay/various roles/ Khunkhar
- Romanchak Arora as Goldie Lacchu Patel
- Kenneth Desai as Shekar Kapoor; President of Ad Craft Ad Agency
- Firdous Mevawala as Chairman
- Anup Upadhyay as Various Characters
- Shekhar Shukla as various Characters
- Manoj Santoshi as Various Characters
- Rakesh Kukreti as Various Characters
- Rupali Ganguly as Sharmili, Vinod's ex-girlfriend
- Vinay Yedekar as Anil Kumar Original
- Amit Bhatt as various characters
- Sham Mashalkar as various characters
- Rakhee Vijan as Katrina (Buntyji's daughter)
- Manmohan Mahimkar as the Funny short Old Man in various characters
- Shashikiran as client/Meera's uncle, Verma's uncle etc.
- Ajit Kelkar as Various Characters including Meera’s fake uncle and client Sam Kapoor
