= Sony SAB =

Indian pay television channel

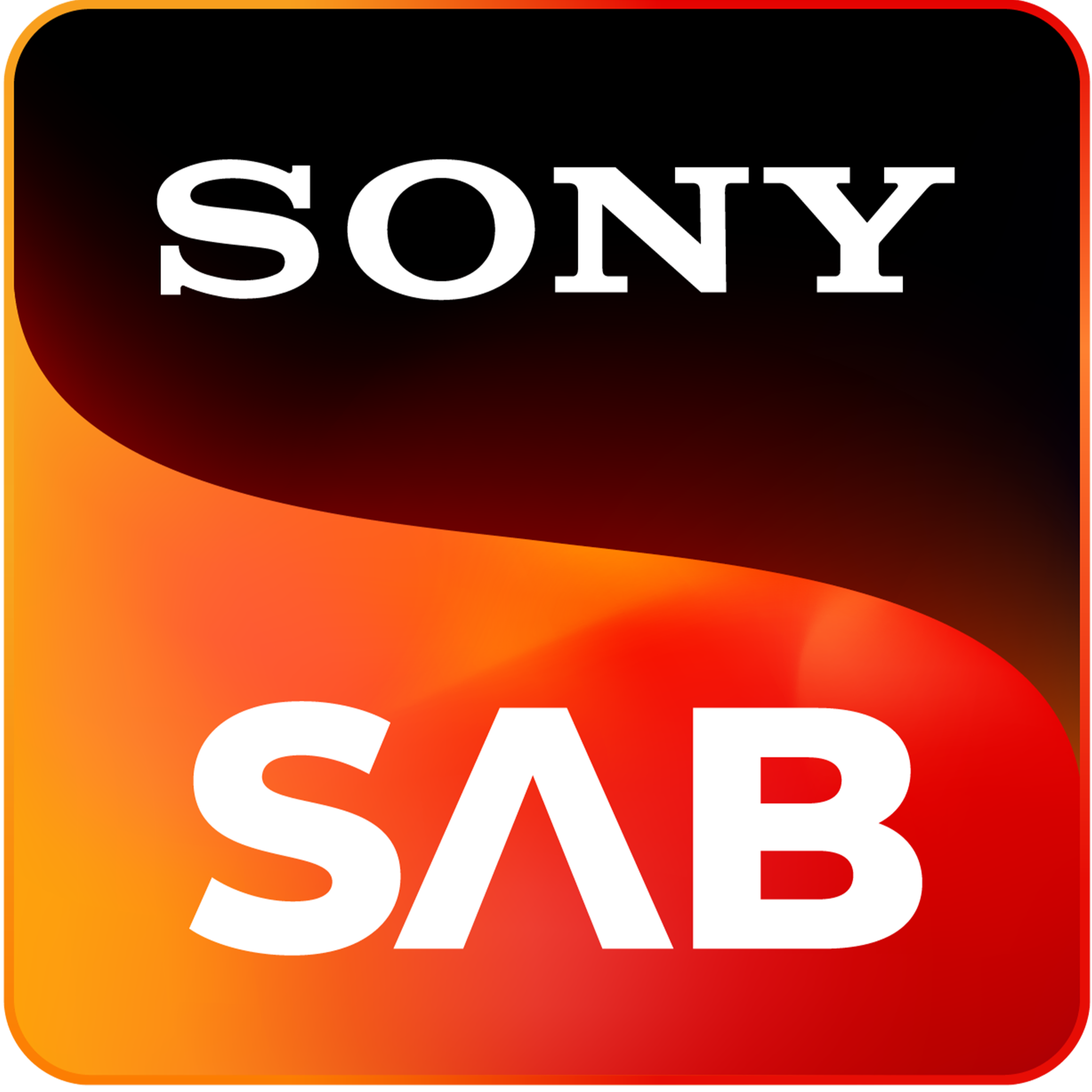
- Logo used since 2022
- Country: India
- Broadcast area: Worldwide

Programming
- Language: Hindi
- Picture format: 1080i HDTV

Ownership
- Owner: Sony Pictures Networks
- Sister channels: See List of channels owned by Sony Pictures Networks

History
- Launched: 23 April 1999; 27 years ago
- Former names: SAB TV (1999–2011)

Links
- Website: Sony SAB

Availability - Available on all major Indian DTH & Cables.

Terrestrial
- DVB-T2 (India): Check local frequencies

Streaming media
- SonyLIV: Watch Sony SAB TV Live (India)
- Sling TV: Internet Protocol television

Sony SAB is an Indian Hindi-language general entertainment pay television channel owned by Sony Pictures Networks. Launched on 23 April 1999, the channel was formerly known as SAB TV.

== History ==
SAB TV was launched by Gautam Adhikari and Markand Adhikari under their company, Sri Adhikari Brothers (thus the acronym) on 23 April 1999. At first, it was launched as a Hindi-language comedy channel. Sony Pictures Networks took over SAB TV in March 2005 and rebranded it as Sony SAB, with a new focus on general entertainment and eventually turning itself into a youth channel. In 2008, Sony SAB changed its appeal to being a Hindi-language generalist network. However, it was only after September 2011, when the logo changed to 'Sony SAB' officially renewing the channel's name.

The high-definition feed of the channel was launched on 5 September 2016.

Yes Boss is one of the longest-running show on the channel. After Yes Boss, Taarak Mehta Ka Ooltah Chashmah became the longest-running show.
