= Farrhana Bhatt =

Indian Actress (born 1997)

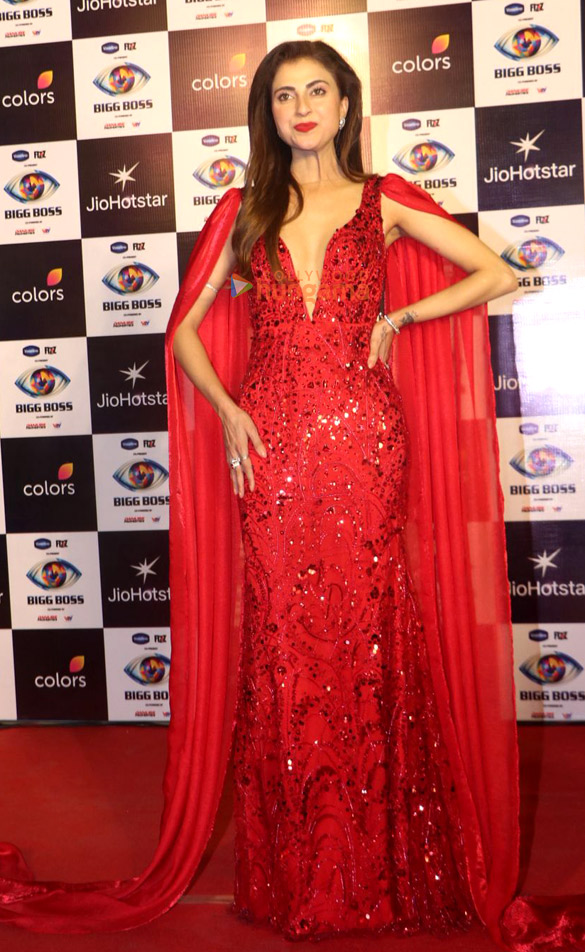
- Bhatt in 2025
- Born: 15 March 1997 (age 29); Srinagar, Jammu and Kashmir, India
- Other name: Farrhana Bhatt
- Occupations: Actress; activist; Model; Martial Artist
- Years active: 2016-present
- Organization: Commonwealth Youth Council (CYC)
- Known for: Laila Majnu (2018); Bigg Boss 19 (2025)
- Height: 5.8 ft (1.73m)

Farrhana Bhatt (born 15 March 1997) is an Indian actress, martial artist and social peace activist who primarily works in Hindi films, television and on streaming platforms. She is best known for her role in Laila Majnu. In 2025, she participated in Bigg Boss 19 in which she emereged as runner up. In 2026,she also participated in the reality show Khatron Ke Khiladi 15 where she emerged as 3rd runner up.

== Early and personal life ==
Bhatt was born on March 15, 1997, in Srinagar, India and hails from a Kashmiri Muslim family.

Bhatt is a national-level athlete who has represented her state and country in Martial Arts (Taekwondo). Farrhana is also a five-time national medallist in the sport and holds a 2nd Dan Black Belt.

In November 2025, a legal controversy erupted concerning statements made about Bhatt by Roshan Garry Bhinder, the aunt of Bigg Boss 19 co-contestant Amaal Mallik, where Bhinder referred to Bhatt using the term "terrorist" on the YouTube channel Fifafooz. Bhatt's family initiated legal action against Bhinder, Fifafooz and YouTube India and characterized the comments as "defamatory and communally charged," expressing deep distress over the "outrageous and baseless allegation." The legal notice demanded the immediate removal of the controversial video, a public apology from the involved parties, and ₹1 crore in damages for the alleged reputational and emotional harm caused to Bhatt.

== Activism ==
In her capacity as a Commonwealth Youth Council executive, she organized and led a seminar and cultural programme in New Delhi, India, on the occasion of the 31st World Disability Day, focusing on "Amplifying the Leadership of Youth with Disabilities."

== Filmography ==
=== Films ===
Year	Title	Role	Notes	Ref(s)
2016	Sunshine Music Tours and Travels	Farzana	Debut film	
2018	Laila Majnu	Jasmeet		
2019	Notebook	Dolly		
2019	Gaash: Light	Farah	Short film	
2023	Country of Blind	Rameshwari		
2024	Singham Again	Reporter	Cameo appearance	
2025	Haan Main Pagal Haan	Raashi	Punjabi film	

=== Television ===
Year	Title	Role	Channel	Notes	Ref(s)
2025	Bigg Boss 19	Contestant	Colors TV	1st runner-up	
2026	The 50	Guest appearance	Colors TV; Jio Hotstar	To promote her song "Yahin Guzaar Doon"	
2026	Khatron Ke Khiladi 15	Contestant	Colors TV; Jio Hotstar	4th place	
2026	Laughter Chefs – Unlimited Entertainment	Guest appearance	Colors TV; Jio Hotstar	To promote her show "Khatron Ke Khiladi 15"	
	Bigg Boss 20	Guest appearance	Colors TV Jio Hotstar	To promote her song "Sahiba"	

=== Web Series ===
Year	Name	Role	Notes	Ref(s)
2023	Heaven of Hindustan	Farhana	Amazon Prime Video documentary	
2023	The Freelancer	Sayema Fasal	Disney+ Hotstar show	
2024	Rakshak: India's Braves Chapter 2	Rehanna	Amazon miniTV show	

== Awards and nominations ==
Year	Award	Category	Work	Result	Ref(s)
2026	Radio City Mumbai Icons Award	Iconic Breakthrough Reality Star	Bigg Boss Season 19	Won	
