= Pranit More =

Indian stand-up comedian

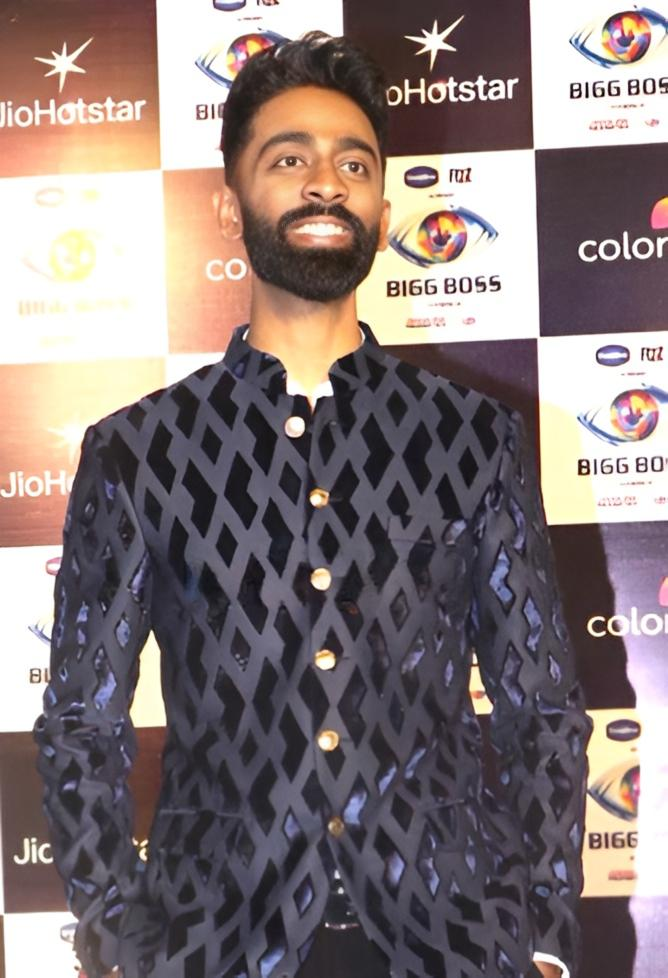
- More in 2025
- Born: Pranit More; 2 March 1991 (age 35); Pune India
- Education: Welingkar Institute of Management Development and Research (MBA)
- Occupations: Stand-up comedian; YouTube content creator; television personality; host

YouTube information
- Channel: Pranit More
- Years active: 2019–present
- Genres: Stand-up comedy; observational comedy
- Subscribers: 2 million
- Views: 774.45 million
- Last updated: 30 December 2025

Pranit More born (2 March 1991) is an Indian stand-up comedian, television personality and former radio jockey. He is noted for his observational humor rooted in Indian daily life and culture, and rose to mainstream fame as a contestant in Bigg Boss 19.

== Early life and education ==
Pranit More was born on 2nd March 1991 in Thane, Maharashtra, into a middle-class Maharashtrian family originally from Khed in Ratnagiri district. His father worked as a conductor for the Maharashtra State Road Transport Corporation, while his mother was a homemaker. More has an elder brother named Prayag More.

As a child, More aspired to become a pilot but shifted his focus to academics. He earned a Bachelor of Management Studies (BMS) from K. J. Somaiya College of Engineering and later an MBA in Marketing from Welingkar Institute of Management Development and Research. Pranit worked as a sales assistant at an automobile showroom before pursuing an MBA. During his MBA years, More briefly worked as a sales assistant at a car dealership but found the corporate routine unfulfilling, prompting him to explore comedy as a hobby.

== Career ==
=== Radio and early comedy ===
More's entry into entertainment began with radio. He worked as a radio jockey (RJ) for Radio Mirchi from 2019–2023. He also hosted Filmfare Awards Marathi.

While still pursuing his MBA, More participated in the Canvas Laugh Club's Open Mic Maverick competition in 2013–2014. His victory in the event marked a pivotal moment, inspiring him to transition from radio to full-time stand-up comedy. He began performing at open mics and small venues, blending personal anecdotes from his middle-class roots with satirical takes on urban Indian life.

=== YouTube and digital content creation ===
More's YouTube channel focusing on short-form comedy sketches, stand-up clips, and relatable content about family dynamics, relationships, and cultural quirks. Videos like those roasting Indian festivals and parental expectations frequently went viral, amassing millions of views, establishing More as a leading digital comedian. His content often features Hindi-Marathi bilingual humor.

=== Stand-up specials ===
More's first full-length stand-up special, Baap Ko Mat Sikha (Don't Teach Your Dad), was released in 2023 and received acclaim for its generational humor. This was followed by Back Bencher in 2024, which explored themes of school life and adult regrets.

=== Television ===
In August 2025, More entered the Bigg Boss 19 house as a contestant, hosted by Salman Khan on Colors TV. His entry was marked by humor and controversy; during the premiere, he quipped about avoiding jokes on Khan to prevent backlash. Inside the house, More's past roasts of Khan resurfaced, leading to a confrontation during the first Weekend Ka Vaar episode.

Pranit More was featured in the Clikker Spotlight series, an editorial initiative by Clikker that profiles notable creators and performers from digital and entertainment fields. His Spotlight feature discussed his work, creative approach, and activities across social and regional content platforms, highlighting his presence within the contemporary creator ecosystem.

== Controversies ==
In February 2025, More was assaulted by a group of 10–12 individuals during a live stand-up show in Solapur, Maharashtra. The attack stemmed from jokes he made about actor Veer Pahariya. More filed a police complaint, and the incident drew widespread condemnation. Pahariya publicly distanced himself, condemning the violence and issuing an apology.

In May 2026, an audience member, Himanshu Jangra voiced some remarks at More's crowdwork show, which received widespread backlash, and were deemed as vile and misogynistic. More was further criticised by Kusha Kapila, Urfi Javed, Sakshi Shivdasani and Dolly Singh, among others, for posting the clip and applauding the man, which prompted him to issue a public apology. More and Jangra, along with another comedian, Madhur Virli, subsequently appeared before the National Commission for Women (NCW) on June 22, 2026.

== Filmography ==
=== Stand-up specials ===
- Baap Ko Mat Sikha (2023)
- Back Bencher (2024)

=== Television ===
Year	Title	Role	Notes	Ref.
2025	Bigg Boss 19	Contestant (2nd Runner up)		
