= Neelam Giri (actress) =

Bhojpuri dancer and actress

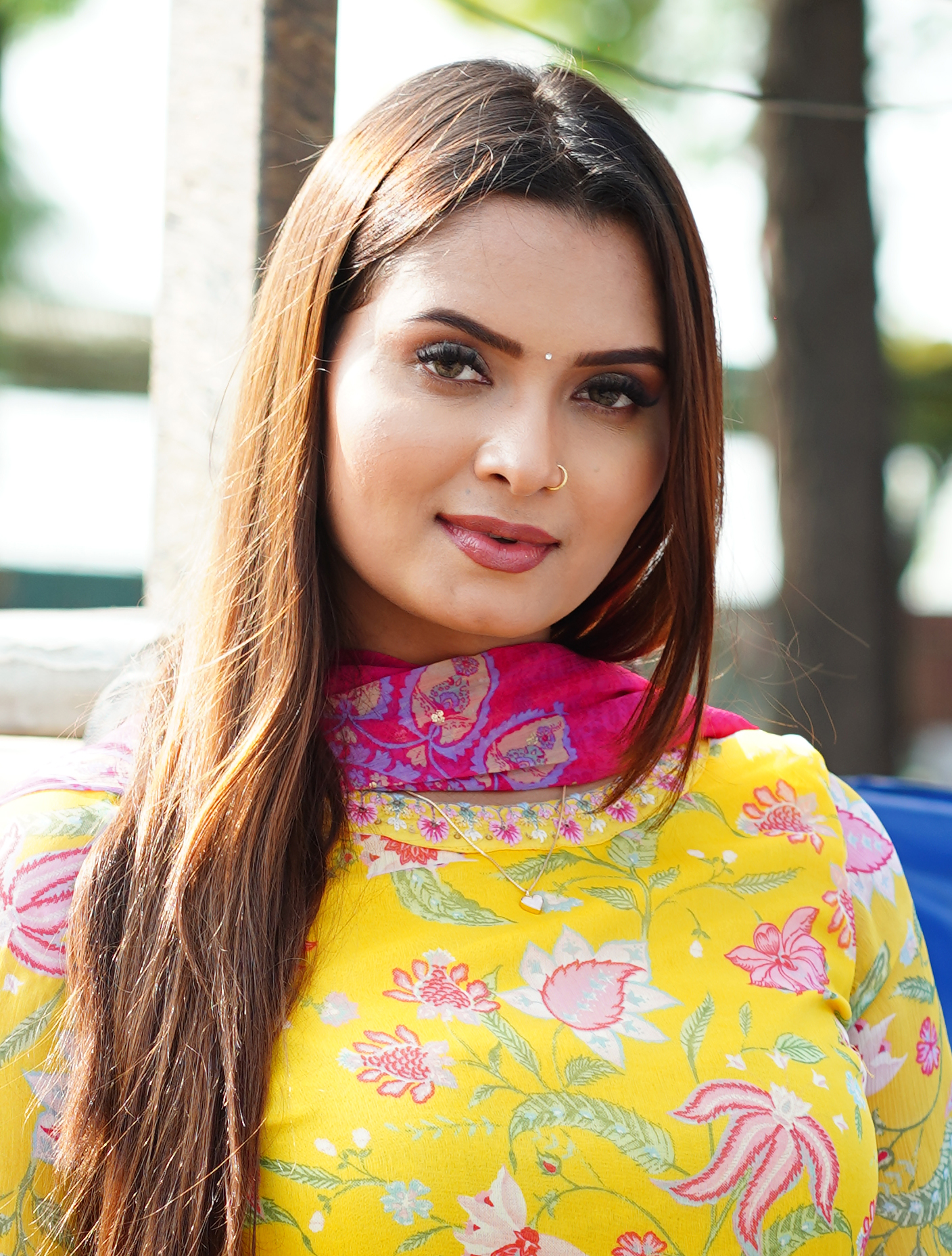
- Neelam Giri in 2026
- Born: 3 September 1997 (age 29); Ballia, Uttar Pradesh, India
- Education: Patna University
- Occupations: Actress; Model; Singer
- Years active: 2020–present
- Notable work: Babul; Kalakand; Bigg Boss 19

Neelam Giri (born 3 September 1997) is an Indian actress. She mainly works in Bhojpuri films and television serials. She made her on-screen debut with Babul (2021) directed by Awdhesh Mishra. Her notable works are Babul (2021), Ijjat Ghar (2022), Tun Tun (2022) and Kalakand (2022).In 2025, she participated in Bigg Boss 19.

== Early life ==
Giri originates from Ballia, Uttar Pradesh, India. Her father owned a hardware shop and she was raised alongside three siblings: two younger twin brothers and an older sister. Giri received her education in Patna.

The actress's break into the acting industry came after her TikTok videos were noticed by Bhojpuri superstar Pawan Singh, who is well known for being an actor, playback singer, music composer, stage performer, and Indian politician. Singh offered her a role in the music video "Dhaniya Hamaar Naya Badi Ho". Following the success of the project, she went on to play roles in several other music videos and films.

== Filmography ==
Key
†	Denotes films that have not yet been released

Year	Title	Role	Language	References
2021	Babul		Bhojpuri Debut	
2022	Ijjat Ghar		Bhojpuri	
2022	Tun Tun		Bhojpuri	
2022	Kalakand		Bhojpuri	
2022	Up-61 Love Story of Ghazipur †	TBA	Bhojpuri	
2023	Anand Aashram †	TBA	Bhojpuri	
2023	Ghar Pariwar †	TBA	Bhojpuri	
2023	Risto ka Batwara †	TBA	Bhojpuri	
2023	Just Married †	TBA	Bhojpuri	
2023	Man Mohini †	TBA	Bhojpuri	
2023	Ghoonghat mein Ghotala 3 †	TBA	Bhojpuri	

=== Television ===
Year	Title	Role	Note(s)	References
2025	Bigg Boss 19	Contestant	12th place	
2026	The 50	Contestant	34th place	
2026	Bhojpuri Bawaal	Herself		

=== Music videos ===
Year	Title	Language	References
2021	Gurekam Feat. Neelam Giri: Dabbi	Punjabi	
2021	Samar Singh, Shilpi Raj Feat. Neelam Giri: Lagelu Jaan Maar Ho	Bhojpuri	
2021	Neelkamal Singh & Shilpi Raj Feat. Neelam Giri: Garnetar	Bhojpuri	
2024	Bedardi Balam	Bhojpuri	
2025	Lagi Tona Tu Shona	Bhojpuri	
2025	Rate Bhar Me	Bhojpuri	
2025	Aam Bhail Chhot	Bhojpuri	
2026	Nache Khatal Par	Bhojpuri	
