= Bigg Boss (Hindi TV series) season 19 =

Season of Television series

Bigg Boss
- Season 19
- Presented by: Salman Khan
- No. of days: 105
- No. of housemates: 18
- Winner: Gaurav Khanna
- Runner-up: Farrhana Bhatt
- Location: Film City, Mumbai
- No. of episodes: 106

Release
- Original network: JioHotstar; Colors TV
- Original release: 24 August – 7 December 2025

Season chronology
- ← Previous; Season 18 Next → Season 20

Bigg Boss 19, also known as Bigg Boss: Iss Baar Chalegi Gharwalon Ki Sarkaar, was the nineteenth season of the Indian Hindi-language reality television series Bigg Boss. It premiered on 24 August 2025 on Colors TV and streamed digitally on JioHotstar. Salman Khan hosted the show for the sixteenth consecutive season. However, Rohit Shetty temporarily hosted the Weekend Ka Vaar episodes (episodes 84 and 85) for the twelfth week (15 November - 16 November 2025) during Khan's absence. The grand finale aired on 7 December 2025 where Gaurav Khanna emerged as the winner and Farrhana Bhatt finished as the runner-up. The season had the most successful debut in the show's history & the season went on to become one of the most successful seasons in the show's history.

== Production ==
=== Development and theme ===
The season's tagline was "Iss Baar Chalegi Gharwalon Ki Sarkaar" (This time, the housemates will rule), introducing a parliament-style twist where housemates formed a government, held assembly debates, and made key decisions.

=== Promotions ===
On 23 August 2025, JioHotstar and Colors TV released promotional clips featuring confirmed contestants Gaurav Khanna, Awez Darbar, Nagma Mirajkar, and Amaal Mallik. The teasers, shared via JioHotstar Reality's Instagram, showcased Khanna performing a dance to Main Hoon Na, described as the "audience ka favourite beta" with the caption, "Jhalak mein jab itna mazza, puri picture mein toh lagega tadka." ("When the glimpse is so much fun, the full picture will surely add spice!") Darbar and Mirajkar performed a couple's dance, with the caption, "Pyaar dosti hai, aur aisi hi ek jodi aa rahi Bigg Boss ke ghar mein! Kya banegi pyaar se sarkaar ya takraar?" Mallik featured a rendition of Kaun Tujhe Yun Pyar Karega, captioned, "Apne sur se dil jeetne wala aa raha hai ab apni sarkaar banane." On 24 August 2025, a teaser featured Neelam Giri dancing to Patli Kamar and Natalia Janoszek to Besharam Rang, described as "Desi chhori" and "Videshi gori," respectively, with the caption, "Desi chhori aur videshi gori ki niraali adaa, inhe dekh sab honge fida!" ("The unique charm of the local girl and the foreign beauty, everyone will be smitten watching them!").

=== Release ===
The official first look and logo were unveiled on 25 July 2025, confirming the season's launch. On 31 July 2025, a teaser featuring Salman Khan announced the premiere date of 24 August 2025 and the “Gharwalon Ki Sarkaar” theme. A full trailer on 7 August 2025 highlighted the parliament-inspired twist.

=== Casting ===
On 14 August 2025, JioHotstar and Colors TV unveiled a promotional campaign featuring Salman Khan, announcing an innovative audience-driven initiative called Fans Ka Faisla (Fans' Decision). Viewers were granted the authority to select one contestant to enter the Bigg Boss house prior to the season's start. The voting process, conducted exclusively via the JioHotstar app, opened on 14 August and was set to close at 11:59 PM on 21 August 2025. The two contenders vying for the audience's vote were:

- Shehbaz Badesha: Singer and the brother of former Bigg Boss 13 contestant Shehnaaz Gill, Badesha had previously appeared on the show as a guest.
- Mridul Tiwari: A prominent content creator known for his YouTube comedy channel The MriDul, which boasts over 18 million subscribers. He creates acting-based comedy videos.

Following the conclusion of the Fans Ka Faisla voting process, Mridul Tiwari was selected by the audience to enter the Bigg Boss house. He entered the house as a contestant during the grand premiere on 24 August 2025. Shehbaz Badesha, despite not being selected through the audience vote, later entered the house as a wildcard contestant on the 14th day of the season.

=== Eye logo ===
The logo features a mosaic-style design with a multicolored iris in shades of blue, yellow, red, and green, symbolizing surveillance and house dynamics. A white border with blue and grey shading aligns with the season's political theme.

=== Broadcast ===
The show streamed on JioHotstar with daily episodes at 9 pm IST, followed by broadcast on Colors TV at 10:30 pm IST, reflecting a digital-first approach. The show also had deferred live stream of 24 hours named as 24 Hours Channel.

=== House ===
The Bigg Boss 19 house, located in Film City, Mumbai, features a "Cabin in the Woods" theme with rustic wooden elements and vibrant accents. It was designed by Omung Kumar and Vanita Garud. The “Gharwalon Ki Sarkaar” sub-theme emphasizes housemate decision-making.

- Living area: Circular sofa in maroon, mustard, orange, and purple, with a bighorn sheep centerpiece.
- Kitchen: Vibrant with parrot installations and bold colors.
- Dining area: Features oversized animal sculptures like a bear face.
- Bedroom: Warm brown hues with 15 beds, including one triple bed.
- Bathroom: Updated wallpapers with a unique palette.
- Confession room: Multicolored eagle theme for Bigg Boss interactions.
- Gym: Modern machines with green garden visuals.
- Garden/Outdoor area: Artificial turf, pool, lion sculpture, and wigwam seating.
- Assembly room: Parliament-like with V-shaped seating for debates.
- App Room: Introduced on Day 6, this room grants weekly access to the housemate trending most on JioHotstar's 24x7 public chat, offering two apps based on positive or negative trending to influence house dynamics.
- Medical Room: A dedicated space for health check-ups and emergencies, ensuring contestant well-being.
- Activity Area: Located near the Medical Room, this space is designated for tasks and challenges.
- Smoking Area: A designated space for breaks, located in the garden area.

Additional features include a secret room and no jail, unlike previous seasons.

=== Trophy ===
The Bigg Boss 19 trophy, unveiled on Day 102 in the Assembly Room to the top five finalists, embodies the season's theme of "Gharwalon Ki Sarkaar" (Housemates' Government), symbolizing governance, unity, and collective strength. Inspired by host Salman Khan's signature hand gesture from the pre-season promos—a folded namaste pose representing respect and harmony—the trophy's design mirrors this motif, evoking a sense of democratic solidarity and triumphant leadership.

- Core Structure: Two large, sculpted human hands crafted from a shimmering silver material, entirely encrusted with sparkling silver/white crystals or rhinestones for a dazzling, reflective surface. The hands are positioned upright in a namaste (prayer) gesture, with fingertips gently touching to form a triangular, steeple-like arch or "roof" shape, resembling a stylized shelter or protective canopy—directly replicating Salman Khan's promotional gesture at the season's start.
- Emblem: Nestled at the base of the arch is the iconic "BB" logo, prominently displayed in luxurious gold-colored crystals/rhinestones, framed for a regal, elevated appearance.
- Base: A sleek black platform inscribed with the text "WINNER - BIGG BOSS 19" in elegant gold lettering. The left side features the JioHotstar logo, while the right side bears the classic multicolored Bigg Boss 19 eye logo. On the back side of the base is the Endemol Shine India logo.

== Housemates status ==
Sr	Housemate	Day entered	Day exited	Status
1	Gaurav	Day 0	Day 105	Winner
2	Farrhana	Day 0	Day 1	Evicted By Housemates
2	Farrhana	Day 6	Day 105	1st runner-up
3	Pranit	Day 0	Day 70	Walked
3	Pranit	Day 75	Day 105	2nd Runner-up
4	Tanya	Day 0	Day 105	3rd Runner-up
5	Amaal	Day 0	Day 105	4th Runner-up
6	Malti	Day 42	Day 102	Evicted
7	Shehbaz	Day 0		Not Selected
7	Shehbaz	Day 14	Day 98	Evicted
8	Ashnoor	Day 0	Day 98	Ejected
9	Kunickaa	Day 0	Day 91	Evicted
10	Mridul	Day 0	Day 80	Evicted
11	Abhishek	Day 0	Day 77	Evicted by Pranit
12	Neelam	Day 0	Day 77	Evicted by Pranit
13	Baseer	Day 0	Day 63	Evicted
14	Nehal	Day 0	Day 28	Evicted
14	Nehal	Day 32	Day 63	Evicted
15	Zeishan	Day 0	Day 49	Evicted
16	Awez	Day 0	Day 35	Evicted
17	Nagma	Day 0	Day 21	Evicted
18	Natalia	Day 0	Day 21	Evicted

== Secret Room status ==
Sl.no	Housemates	Day entered	Day exited	Housemates status
1	Farrhana	Day 1	Day 6	Re-entered main house
2	Nehal	Day 28	Day 30	Re-entered main house

== Housemates ==
The following housemates entered the house in order:

16 Original entrants of season with host and eye logo

=== Original entrants ===
- Abhishek Bajaj – Actor known for Student of the Year 2, Chandigarh Kare Aashiqui and Jubilee Talkies.
- Ashnoor Kaur – Actress known for Yeh Rishta Kya Kehlata Hai, Patiala Babes and Suman Indori.
- Zeishan Quadri – Writer and actor known for Gangs of Wasseypur.
- Tanya Mittal – Influencer, model and Miss Asia Tourism 2018.
- Awez Darbar – Choreographer and dancer, brother-in-law of Bigg Boss 7 winner Gauahar Khan. and son of Bigg Boss 3 contestant Ismail Darbar.
- Nagma Mirajkar – Dancer and influencer known for lifestyle and dance videos.
- Nehal Chudasama – Actress, model and Miss Diva Universe 2018.
- Baseer Ali – Reality TV alumni and actor known for Roadies, Splitsvilla, Ace of Space and Kundali Bhagya.
- Gaurav Khanna – Actor known for Anupamaa, CID and Celebrity MasterChef India.
- Natalia Janoszek – Polish actress known for Chicken Curry Law and Housefull 5.
- Pranit More – Stand-up comedian and former radio jockey.
- Farrhana Bhatt – Actress and activist known for Laila Majnu.
- Neelam Giri – Bhojpuri actress known for Babul.
- Kunickaa Sadanand – Actress and advocate known for Bollywood roles, sister-in-law of Bigg Boss 1 contestant Deepak Tijori
- Mridul Tiwari – Content creator selected via Fans Ka Faisla vote.
- Amaal Mallik – Music composer and singer, nephew of Bigg Boss 13 contestant Abu Mallik.

=== Wildcard entrants ===
- Shehbaz Badesha – Singer, comedian and brother of Bigg Boss 13 contestant Shehnaaz Gill.
- Malti Chahar - Indian actress, model, and filmmaker known for Maa O Meri Maa, Sada Viah Hoya Ji and 7 Phere: A Dream Housewife.

== Twists ==
=== Fans Ka Faisla ===
On 14 August 2025, JioHotstar and Colors TV launched the Fans Ka Faisla campaign, allowing viewers to select one housemate via the JioHotstar app from 14 August to 21 August 2025, 23:59 IST. Contenders were:

- Shehbaz Badesha: Singer, comedian and brother of Bigg Boss 13 contestant Shehnaaz Gill, previously a guest on the show.
- Mridul Tiwari: Content creator known for The MriDul comedy channel.

Mridul Tiwari won, entering the house on Grand Premiere.

== Weekly summary ==
Week 1	Entrances	During the grand premiere on 24 August 2025, host Salman Khan introduced 16 housemates. Ashnoor, Zeishan, Tanya, Awez, Nagma, Nehal, Abhishek, Baseer, Gaurav, Natalia, Pranit, Farhana, Neelam, Kunickaa, Mridul, and Amaal entered the house in order; meanwhile, Shehbaz was not selected for entering the house by the audience.
Week 1	Twists	On Day 0, Bigg Boss introduced a task requiring housemates to select one person to sleep outside the bedroom, which has only 15 beds, on the basis of considering that housemate "not a housemate". Mridul was voted by the majority.; On Day 1, the Assembly Room was inaugurated, where housemates voted to evict one contestant, leading to Farhana's elimination and relocation to a secret room.; On Day 6, Bigg Boss unveiled a new “App Room” in the house, accessible each week to the housemate trending most on the JioHotstar 24x7 public chat. The selected housemate receives two apps based on whether their trending is positive or negative. As Farhana had been observing housemates from the secret room since Day 1, Bigg Boss allowed her to choose one housemate to access the App Room, with the condition that her re-entry into the main house depended on that housemate's app choice. Farhana selected Gaurav, who was granted access. His options were: “Re-entry: Farhana Returns,” allowing Farhana to rejoin the main house, or “Half Ration, Half Plates,” reducing the house's ration to half. Gaurav chose “Re-entry: Farhana Returns,” resulting in Farhana's return to the main house from the secret room. Prior to this, Bigg Boss announced Farhana's presence in the secret room, revealing her actions, including comments on nominations on Day 2, eliminating Baseer from the Merry-Go-Round captaincy contendership task on Day 4, and selecting Gaurav for App Room access.
Week 1	Nominations	Mridul Tiwari and Shehbaz Badesha were nominated for the Fans Ka Faisla vote, with Mridul winning.
Week 1	Nominations	On Day 1, housemates nominated one contestant for eviction in the Assembly Room. Farhana received the most votes but was sent to a secret room instead of being fully evicted.
Week 1	Nominations	On Day 2, housemates nominated two contestants for eviction in the Assembly Room. As a result, Abhishek, Gaurav, Natalia, Neelam, Pranit, Tanya and Zeishan were nominated for weekend's eviction process.
Week 1	House Captain	None
Week 1	Tasks	On Day 4, the "Merry-Go-Round" task was held in the garden area to select contenders for the house captain. A merry-go-round was set up alongside four houses, each with a digital screen. Before the task began, Bigg Boss asked Farhana, observing from the secret room, to remove one housemate from contention. She chose Baseer, who was then appointed as the sanchalak (moderator) for the first round. When a children's laughter was heard, housemates mounted the merry-go-round, which rotated until the song stopped. The digital screens on the four houses then displayed the number of housemates each could accommodate. After the first round, Baseer selected one house, and its occupants were eliminated from captaincy contention. Eliminated housemates joined Baseer to decide eliminations in subsequent rounds. The task continued similarly, with multiple rounds narrowing down the contenders. After five rounds, Ashnoor Kaur, Kunickaa Sadanand, and Abhishek Bajaj emerged as the final contenders.: Round / Eliminated; 1 / Amaal; Mridul; 2 / Awez; Nagma; Natalia; 3 / Neelam; 4 / Pranit; Tanya; 5 / Gaurav; Nehal; Zeishan
Week 1	Tasks	On Day 5, a captaincy task was held in the garden area to determine the first house captain. A large stage was set up with three workstations, each assigned to a contender: Abhishek (blue color), Ashnoor (green color), and Kunickaa (red color), as designated by the sanchalak. Each workstation had crayons in the contender's assigned color. Supporter housemates selected a tile from a deck, colored one side with their contender's color, and marked the other side with a coal cross. They handed the tile to their contender (or their representative), who placed it on the stage. Other contenders could flip opponents’ tiles to display the crossed side. Bigg Boss asked the contenders if they would personally place tiles on the stage or appoint a representative. Abhishek and Ashnoor chose to participate themselves, while Kunickaa selected Baseer as her representative, which disqualified her from participating in task. Tanya was appointed sanchalak, tasked with determining the winner based on the contender with the most tiles showing their colored side (blue for Abhishek, green for Ashnoor, red for Kunickaa) visible on the stage. Tanya declared Kunickaa the winner, making her the first house captain.
Week 1	Sponsored	On Day 6, Appy Fizz congratulated Kunickaa as the first Appy Fizz Captain of the house. An Appy Fizz Visi Cooler was unlocked, and Kunickaa received one bottle of Appy Fizz, choosing to share a second bottle with Baseer.
Week 1	Exits	Shehbaz, not selected via Fans Ka Faisla, was evicted on Day 0.
Week 2
Week 2	Entrances	On Day 14, Shehbaz Badesha entered the Bigg Boss 19 house as the first wild card contestant during the Weekend Ka Vaar, supported by his sister Shehnaaz Gill's appearance on stage.
Week 2	Twists	On Day 9, Bigg Boss dismissed Kunickaa as house captain after housemates voted against her leadership, citing her failure. Bigg Boss declared no new captain, with the house to be managed collectively.After Kunickaa's dismissal, housemates declined to grant her captaincy immunity, making her eligible for nominations. The majority voted for Ashnoor to receive immunity from the week's nominations.; On Day 11, Bigg Boss summoned all housemates to the Assembly Room for a Truth and Dare game, focusing on Pranit More's Day 10 The BB Show roast, where he claimed his performance was 90% truth and 10% exaggeration. Bigg Boss highlighted Pranit's statement that the house no longer needed gas to prepare food but required a stove due to “so much kerosene with Zeishan,” questioning whether this was 90% truth or 10% exaggeration. Housemates were asked to share their opinions on the statement, with a question displayed on the TV: “Does Zeishan do the work of kerosene in the house—meaning, does he ignite conflicts or situations?” Bigg Boss instructed housemates to debate, stating that if the outcome favored Pranit, he would remain in the captaincy race and Zeishan would be excluded, but if it favored Zeishan, Pranit would be excluded. After the debate, the verdict favored Zeishan, resulting in Pranit being removed from the captaincy race.; On Day 14, the App Room was opened for housemates voted by the audience for their BB Show performances as the most trending on JioHotstar's 24x7 public chat. Kunickaa accessed it first, choosing between “Suraksha Kawach Block Eviction” (protects a nominated housemate from eviction despite least votes) and “Battery Saver No Duty” (exempts from house duties). She chose “Suraksha Kawach Block Eviction.” Mridul Tiwari accessed it next, choosing between “Gift A Rose Phoolon Ka Tohfa” (receives roses to gift to one housemate) and “Suraksha Kawach Block Eviction,” selecting the latter. During the eviction process, host Salman Khan announced Kunickaa received the least votes but was saved due to her “Suraksha Kawach Block Eviction” choice, resulting in no eviction.; On Day 14, after Shehbaz's wild card entry into the house, Bigg Boss announced that the bed sealed during the Dream Machine task on Day 10 would be available for Shehbaz, as he was not in the house at the time of the task. Shehbaz can use the bed, but no other housemate is allowed to.
Week 2	Nominations	On Day 9, Bigg Boss introduced the “Room of Fate” nomination task. Housemates were divided into trios, with three standing in red triangles, indicating they were at risk of nomination, while three others in green triangles decided which one of the red triangle trio would be nominated. At the end of each round, one housemate was nominated. Housemates could participate multiple times in green triangles to decide nominations.: Round / At red triangle / At green triangle / Nominated; 1 / Awez; Nagma; Baseer / Amaal; Zeishan; Abhishek / Awez; 2 / Natalia; Mridul; Neelam / Kunickaa; Tanya; Pranit / Mridul; 3 / Farhana; Gaurav; Kunickaa / Awez; Abhishek; Mridul / Kunickaa; 4 / Tanya; Zeishan; Nehal / Gaurav; Farhana; Baseer / Tanya; 5 / Abhishek; Amaal; Pranit / Nehal; Ashnoor; Nagma / Amaal; Awez, Mridul, Kunickaa, Tanya and Amaal were nominated for weekend's eviction process.
Week 2	House Captain	~~Kunickaa~~
Week 2	Tasks	The BB Show On Day 10, Bigg Boss addressed housemates’ concerns about dwindling rations, announcing that weekly rations would be provided by evening, contingent on their participation in an entertainment task called “The BB Show.” The show, hosted by Zeishan, featured performances by few housemates to secure rations. Neelam opened with a dance act, followed by Amaal performing a dislike song targeting two housemates he dislikes. Pranit performed a stand-up comedy roast focusing on five housemates he dislikes. Mridul, alongside Kunickaa as co-actor, presented a sketch based on one or two housemates he dislikes. Tanya delivered a talk on struggles, reflecting on her personal experiences with house and its current housemates. Awez closed the show with a dance performance. Later, Bigg Boss called Gaurav to the confession room to judge the performances based on criteria provided by Bigg Boss, with live footage broadcast to housemates in the living area, unbeknownst to Gaurav. Gaurav passed the performances of Amaal, Pranit, and Tanya, but failed Mridul and Kunickaa's sketch. As a result, 10% of the weekly ration was cut, and the housemates received 90% of the ration.
Week 2	Tasks	Dream Machine On Day 11, Bigg Boss introduced the “Dream Machine” task in the garden area, designed to grant captaincy contention in one attempt by activating a lever on the machine. However, following the rule of “one hand gives, one hand takes,” housemates had to accept a condition displayed on the machine's digital screen to secure contention. All housemates, except Pranit (who was excluded from the captaincy race earlier that day), stood at a start line. At the sound of the machine's start signal, housemates could accept the displayed condition and rush to a red circle, which granted the power to claim captaincy contention. The first housemate to reach the red circle would declare their desire for captaincy contention and accept the condition. Bigg Boss would then call them to activate the machine's lever, sealing their captaincy contention. Pranit, as sanchalak, was tasked with determining which housemate reached the red circle first.: Round / Winner / Condition / Status; 1 / Baseer / surrender two apples from the ration to Bigg Boss / Accepted; 2 / Abhishek / seal off one bed in the house, preventing anyone from sleeping on it / Accepted; 3 / Nehal / no gym - close the gym for the entire season, prohibiting any housemate from using it or its equipment / No Declined; Nehal reached the red circle in the third round but declined the gym closure condition. Bigg Boss reprimanded her for misleading viewers by reaching the circle only to decline, canceled the third round, and terminated the task, stating more rounds were planned. Consequently, Baseer and Abhishek were declared captaincy contenders.
Week 2	Tasks	On Day 12, a captaincy task was set up in the garden area to determine the house captain between contenders Baseer and Abhishek. Fourteen stools, each in a designated circle, were placed with colored threads—blue for Baseer and pink for Abhishek—at opposite ends. Housemates sat on the stools while Baseer and Abhishek first collected their respective threads, then aimed to tie them to one leg of as many stools as possible. During the task, the opposing contender and the housemate seated on a stool could attempt to untie the thread. At the task's conclusion, Bigg Boss asked Mridul for the result, who announced Baseer as the winner, having tied blue threads to more stools, making him the house captain.
Week 2	Sponsored	On Day 9, the Flipkart Style Studio was opened in the garden area, offering housemates access to the latest and trendiest fashion from Flipkart. This week's theme, streetwear, was unlocked, allowing housemates to choose stylish looks.; On Day 13, Danube Properties, known for fully furnished designer homes, provided housemates with a luxurious hamper from Dubai containing chocolates.; On Day 14, Flipkart announced the results of the Flipkart Fashion Icon contest, with contenders Tanya, Nehal, and Gaurav, chosen by audience and jury votes. Tanya was declared the winner, receiving Flipkart vouchers worth ₹2,50,000.
Week 2	Exits	On Day 14, no eviction took place.
Week 3
Week 3	Twists	On Day 19, Bigg Boss called all housemates to the Assembly Room and announced that Baseer's tenure as house captain had ended. A new captain was to be chosen from the BB Sports Day task winning team members: Awez, Pranit, Abhishek, Mridul, Amaal, Tanya, Farhana, and Ashnoor. Each contender delivered a speech from the podium explaining why they should be captain, followed by a housemate vote. Amaal received the majority and was chosen as house captain.
Week 3	Nominations	On Day 16, Bigg Boss called house captain Baseer to the confession room and asked him to save one female housemate from nominations, citing the higher number of female housemates compared to males. Baseer chose Nehal, granting her immunity from nominations. Shehbaz was exempted from nominations as it was his first week in the house. Bigg Boss announced a nomination task where housemates were paired (one male, one female) by Bigg Boss to count exactly 19 minutes. The male sat on a sidecar scooter in the garden area, pressing a horn to signal completion, while the female sat at a makeup station in the Activity Area, pressing a buzzer. Other housemates could disturb both simultaneously, one at a time. Pairs furthest from 19 minutes (either less or more) were nominated. During Awez and Nagma's counting, Abhishek entered the Activity Area to disturb Nagma but closed the area, blocking others’ access. Bigg Boss disqualified Awez and Nagma's pair for this interference, nominating them for eviction.: Pair / Counted time / Difference / Status; Abhishek-Ashnoor / 23:30 Mins / 4:30 / Safe; Pranit-Farhana / 20:48 Mins / 1:48 / Safe; Awez-Nagma / Disqualified / / Nominated; Gaurav-Tanya / 20:25 Mins / 1:25 / Safe; Mridul-Natalia / 14:07 Mins / 4:53 / Nominated; Zeishan-Neelam / 23:40 Mins / 4:40 / Safe; Amaal-Kunickaa / 22:59 Mins / 3:59 / Safe; Mridul, Natalia, Awez and Nagma were nominated for weekend's eviction process.
Week 3	House Captain	Baseer
Week 3	Tasks	BB Coaching Centre On Day 17, Bigg Boss set up the “BB Coaching Centre” in the Activity Area, where housemates’ performance would impact the weekly ration. The task involved periods with one housemate as teacher per subject, while others acted as students.: Teacher / Subject; Zeishan / Characters; Natalia / Hindi; Farhana / Love; Gaurav / Cooking; Abhishek / Physical Training (PT); After completion, Bigg Boss announced that due to the housemates’ honest efforts, they would receive the full weekly ration.
Week 3	Tasks	BB Sports Day On Day 18, the “BB Sports Day” task began in the garden area for captaincy contendership, featuring two teams: Team Red (Abhishek, Amaal, Awez, Pranit, Tanya, Mridul, Ashnoor, Farhana) and Team Blue (Baseer, Neelam, Zeishan, Kunickaa, Gaurav, Shehbaz, Natalia, Nehal, Nagma). The best-of-three games determined which team's members would be eligible for captaincy. The first game, “Writer and Duster,” involved two blackboards per team. Each team nominated a writer to write on the opposing team's blackboard (reasons why the other team didn't deserve captaincy) and a duster to erase their own. Team Red (Abhishek as writer, Amaal as duster) and Team Blue (Nehal as writer, Baseer as duster) competed, with Awez and Nagma as sanchalaks. Team Red won, as their blackboard had less writing, leading 1-0. The task paused for the day. On Day 19, the BB Sports Day task continued with the second game, “Scrabble.” Each team nominated five players: Team Red (Ashnoor, Farhana, Tanya, Mridul, Awez) and Team Blue (Nagma, Shehbaz, Neelam, Baseer, Zeishan). Players stood at their team's start line, answered a Bigg Boss question (a housemate's name), retrieved clothing with alphabets from their team's container, and aligned on an answer board to display the first five letters of the name. Sanchalaks Amaal and Gaurav judged which team aligned first and validated their reason for the name. If a team's reason was invalid, the sanchalaks validated the next team's reason; if valid, the point went to that team, or the round was canceled if invalid. The first team to win four rounds won the game. Team Red won 4-2, securing the overall task victory (2-0), making Abhishek, Amaal, Awez, Pranit, Tanya, Mridul, Ashnoor, and Farhana eligible for captaincy.
Week 3	Tasks	Winner – Team Red: Abhishek, Amaal, Awez, Pranit, Tanya, Mridul, Ashnoor, Farhana
Week 3	Tasks	Failed – Team Blue: Baseer, Neelam, Zeishan, Kunickaa, Gaurav, Shehbaz, Natalia, Nehal, Nagma
Week 3	Sponsored	On Day 17, the Flipkart Style Studio was opened in the garden area, offering housemates access to the latest and trendiest fashion from Flipkart. This week's theme, denims, was unlocked, allowing housemates to choose stylish looks.; On Day 21, host Salman Khan unveiled the OPPO F31 Series 5G mobile phones, set to launch on September 15, 2025. Guest host Akshay Kumar gifted the phones to all housemates in the house before their official launch, assuring them they would receive the devices after their exit from the show.
Week 3	Exits	On Day 21, Natalia Janoszek and Nagma Mirajkar became first and second housemates to get evicted.
Week 4
Week 4	Twists	On Day 26, Bigg Boss called all housemates to the Assembly Room to evaluate house captain Amaal Mallik's captaincy and style. The majority of housemates voted in favor of Amaal's leadership. As a result, Bigg Boss announced that outgoing captain Amaal would have the opportunity to defend his captaincy and be a captaincy contender alongside Zeishan, Abhishek, Mridul, Tanya, Ashnoor, Neelam, Shehbaz.
Week 4	Nominations	On Day 24, Bigg Boss called housemates to the Assembly Room for nominations, where each had to rapidly nominate two housemates without giving reasons. After nominations, Bigg Boss revealed a rule violation involving nomination discussions, showing footage to the housemates. All housemates except Captain Amaal were at risk of full nomination. Bigg Boss introduced a twist, aligning with the season's democracy theme, allowing housemates uninvolved in the discussions to seek safety. Each housemate was called to the confession room to name two housemates they wanted to save from nominations. Amaal, involved in the discussions, had no special power in this process. After the process, Nehal, Ashnoor, and Pranit (each with 1 save vote) and Baseer and Abhishek (with 0 save votes) were nominated for weekend's eviction process.
Week 4	House Captain	Amaal
Week 4	Tasks	On Day 25, a captaincy contendership task was held in the garden area, where teams competed to steal captaincy contendership, represented by gold biscuits locked in a ship that turned over in the swimming pool. Two teams were formed: Team A (Zeishan, Abhishek, Mridul, Tanya, Ashnoor, Neelam, Shehbaz) and Team B (Baseer, Gaurav, Nehal, Awez, Pranit, Kunickaa, Farhana). The task required teams to collect gold biscuits and sacks falling into the pool and fill their godown with sacks containing 15 biscuits each. The team with the most filled sacks would win, making their members eligible for captaincy. Amaal was the sanchalak. Three members per team participated at a time: one in the pool collecting biscuits and sacks after a gun sound, and two filling their godown, stealing from other godown, and protecting their godown. After a “chai garam chai” signal, teams could change members if desired. At the conclusion of the task, sanchalak Amaal declared Team A as the winner for filling the most sacks with gold biscuits. Consequently, Team A's members—Zeishan, Abhishek, Mridul, Tanya, Ashnoor, Neelam, and Shehbaz—became captaincy contenders.
Week 4	Tasks	Winner – Team A: Zeishan, Abhishek, Mridul, Tanya, Ashnoor, Neelam, Shehbaz
Week 4	Tasks	Failed – Team B: Baseer, Gaurav, Nehal, Awez, Pranit, Kunickaa, Farhana
Week 4	Tasks	On Day 27, Bigg Boss announced that Amaal's captaincy tenure had ended. A captaincy task was held in the garden area involving contenders Zeishan, Tanya, Abhishek, Ashnoor, Neelam, Shehbaz, Mridul, and Amaal. The task centered around a large cheese prop with eight openings, symbolizing captaincy. After the song “Dil Cheez Kya Hai” played, contenders lined up at a start point. A non-contending housemate selected a stopper, announced they would block one opening, and entered the cheese to do so. At a gunshot sound, contenders ran to the cheese, each attempting to secure an opening and put their face through it. The contender failing to secure an opening was eliminated from the task and captaincy race. Seven rounds were conducted, with Kunickaa judging via a plasma screen.: Round / Blocker / Eliminated; 1 / Gaurav / Neelam; 2 / Nehal / Zeishan; 3 / Farhana / Tanya; 4 / Baseer / Shehbaz; 5 / Pranit / Mridul; 6 / Awez / Ashnoor; 7 / Nehal / Amaal; Abhishek, the last contender remaining, won the task and became the new house captain.
Week 4	Sponsored	On Day 26, Flipkart announced the results of the Flipkart Fashion Icon contest, with contenders Gaurav, Nehal, and Ashnoor, chosen by audience and jury votes. Gaurav was declared the winner, receiving Flipkart vouchers worth ₹2,50,000. Also, the Flipkart Style Studio was opened in the garden area, offering housemates access to the latest and trendiest fashion from Flipkart. This week's theme, ethnics, was unlocked, allowing housemates to choose stylish looks.; On Day 28, host Salman announced the results of the Flipkart Fashion Icon contest of season, with contenders Tanya, Nehal, and Ashnoor, chosen by audience and jury votes. Tanya was declared the winner, receiving Flipkart vouchers worth ₹5,00,000.
Week 4	Exits	On Day 28, Nehal was evicted but later relocated to Secret Room.
Week 5
Week 5	Twists	On Day 31, Bigg Boss questioned Nehal, who was in the secret room, about house dynamics. The first question asked which female housemate Nehal would give a major advantage to for captaincy contendership, given there were more male housemates. Nehal chose Farhana. The second question asked whether Nehal viewed house captain Abhishek as "good" or "nonsense". Nehal answered "nonsense". Bigg Boss declared that Nehal's opinion would influence the house, stating that while Abhishek, as captain, would gain access to the App Room, his "nonsense" label meant he would only receive "nonsense apps" as powers associated with his captaincy.; On Day 31, Bigg Boss called house captain Abhishek to the App Room, granting him exclusive access to special apps as a captain's privilege. He was offered the ability to give one female housemate a major advantage in captaincy contendership with the following options: (1) Advantage Ashnoor, giving Ashnoor a major advantage but reducing the house's weekly ration to 75%; (2) Advantage Farhana, giving Farhana a major advantage but ending Abhishek's captaincy immediately and barring him from captaincy for two weeks; (3) Advantage Neelam, giving Neelam a major advantage but barring Awez from ever becoming captain; (4) Advantage Tanya, giving Tanya a major advantage but barring Gaurav from ever becoming captain; (5) Advantage Kunickaa, giving Kunickaa a major advantage but requiring Abhishek to destroy Ashnoor's favorite soft toy in front of her. Abhishek chose Advantage Ashnoor, granting her a major advantage in captaincy contendership, with the house receiving 75% of the weekly ration. Bigg Boss later revealed these details to all housemates.; On Day 32, Bigg Boss called all housemates to the Assembly Room to share their opinions on house captain Abhishek's captaincy, asking whether they were happy or unhappy with his performance. The majority of housemates voted that they were happy with Abhishek's captaincy. As a result, Bigg Boss announced that Abhishek would receive a full opportunity to gain captaincy contendership and the chance to become house captain again.; On Day 32, Bigg Boss consulted Nehal, in the secret room, about key decisions for a captaincy contendership task. Bigg Boss announced a task with three rounds, where in each round, one housemate would have the power to eliminate four housemates from captaincy contendership. Ashnoor and Farhana, already designated as sanchalaks for the task, could not be getting power. For the first round, Nehal was asked to choose which housemate should receive this elimination power. She selected Awez. For the second round, she selected Kunickaa. In the third round, with only Awez and Gaurav remaining, Bigg Boss asked Nehal to choose a captaincy contender. She selected Gaurav, making him and Farhana the final captaincy contenders. Bigg Boss then announced that Nehal would re-enter the house and later in a day she re-entered the house.; On Day 33, Bigg Boss called all housemates to the Assembly Room to choose the house captain between Farhana and Gaurav. Housemates came to the podium one by one, where both contenders stood, and placed a black garland on the contender they did not want as captain. Gaurav received 7 black garlands, while Farhana received 6. As a result, Farhana won and became the house captain.
Week 5	Nominations	On Day 30, Bigg Boss announced a team-based nomination task in the Assembly Room, with two teams competing; the losing team's members would be nominated for eviction. Team Pranit (Pranit, Mridul, Awez, Neelam, Gaurav, Ashnoor) was led by Pranit, and Team Shehbaz (Shehbaz, Kunickaa, Tanya, Farhana, Zeishan, Amaal, Baseer) was led by Shehbaz. The task required teams to provide commentary on live house activities in the commentary room set up in the Activity Area. A blue light signaled Team Pranit's turn, with Pranit choosing a partner to commentate on silent live footage shown on a TV. A red light signaled Team Shehbaz's turn, with Shehbaz choosing a partner. Three rounds were held where Pranit chose to partner with Neelam, Gaurav and Mridul whereas Shehbaz chose to partner with Amaal, Zeishan and Farhana, with Abhishek, the house captain, exempt from nominations and not participating. The 24x7 live audience was to judge, but Bigg Boss assigned Nehal, watching from the secret room, to decide the outcome. Nehal declared Team Shehbaz the winner, resulting in Team Pranit's members—Pranit, Mridul, Awez, Neelam, Gaurav, and Ashnoor—being nominated for eviction.
Week 5	House Captain	Abhishek
Week 5	Tasks	On Day 31, Bigg Boss set up a captaincy contendership task for two female housemates, Ashnoor (selected by captain Abhishek in the App Room) and Farhana (selected by Nehal in the secret room, announced via a spin wheel on plasma). Cartons of rations (75% of the weekly ration, per Abhishek's App Room choice) were spread across the house, excluding the bathroom area. The task involved two drones, each by Ashnoor and Farhana, delivering cartons to either the house godown (near the tunnel) for the house's weekly ration or the Bigg Boss godown set in store room (divided into Ashnoor's and Farhana's zones) for return to Bigg Boss. Other housemates decided whether to hand cartons to any of the drones. At the buzzer of task end, undelivered cartons would be captured by Bigg Boss. The drone delivering the most cartons to their store room zone would earn captaincy contendership. Housemates were restricted to their areas during the task, but drones could move freely. After the task, Bigg Boss asked Baseer to report the count of cartons in each drone's store room zone. Baseer announced Ashnoor delivered five cartons and Farhana delivered seven. Farhana, having delivered more, won captaincy contendership. Bigg Boss confirmed that only cartons in the house godown would serve as the house's weekly ration.
Week 5	Tasks	Winner – Farhana
Week 5	Tasks	Failed – Ashnoor
Week 5	Tasks	On Day 32, Bigg Boss announced that Farhana had defeated Ashnoor in the Day 31 drone task, securing captaincy contendership for the week, while Ashnoor lost her chance for captaincy contendership. Bigg Boss introduced a new task, consisting of three parties to determine further captaincy contenders. In each party, some housemates would be eliminated from contendership, with the elimination process to be revealed during the parties. The first party in bedroom area, a pyjama party, required housemates to dance and enjoy songs when played. When the music stopped, each housemate had to sit on a bed. Bigg Boss then announced that a party requires photos, designating Awez as the photographer. A camera was provided in the storeroom for Awez to take 10 photos. Housemates had to remain seated on their beds, unable to hide or dodge the photographer. Sanchalaks Ashnoor and Farhana, judging together, would identify the four housemates most clearly visible in the photos, who would then be eliminated from the captaincy contendership race. The challenge was that Awez had to wear party glasses, rendering him unable to see, requiring assistance from housemates on beds to navigate. After Awez clicked 10 photos, sanchalaks Ashnoor and Farhana declared that Zeishan, Baseer, Amaal, and Tanya were the most visible in the photos, eliminating them from the captaincy contendership race. The first party then concluded. Bigg Boss continued the captaincy contendership task with the second third party in the garden area. The second party, a disco party, involved remaining contenders Abhishek, Pranit, Gaurav, Kunickaa, Mridul, Neelam, Awez, and Shehbaz. Housemates danced to music and sat on chairs when it stopped. Bigg Boss named Kunickaa as the photographer, tasked with taking 10 photos using a camera from the storeroom while wearing vision-obscuring party glasses, requiring assistance from housemates on chairs. Sanchalaks Ashnoor and Farhana identified Neelam, Pranit, Shehbaz, and Mridul as the most visible in the photos, eliminating them from the captaincy contendership race. The second party concluded. The third party, Bigg Boss Movie Night, was held in a movie theatre setup in the Activity Area for remaining contenders Kunickaa, Gaurav, Abhishek, and Awez. Real house footage was shown, requiring close attention. After each movie, Bigg Boss asked a question, and contenders pressed buzzers to answer first. Correct answers allowed eliminating one housemate from the captaincy race. Ashnoor was the sanchalak for the first buzzer, Farhana for the second. The first movie showed house discussions about the external world, followed by the question, “Which color dress was Tanya wearing in this clip?” Ashnoor declared Abhishek pressed the buzzer first; he answered “pink,” which was correct, and eliminated Kunickaa. The second movie led to the question, “Who was the fourth member alongside Baseer, Zeishan, and Amaal in the cli[?” Farhana declared Gaurav pressed first; he answered “Shehbaz,” which was correct, and eliminated Abhishek. For the final movie, Bigg Boss revealed Nehal as the task judge, who had previously decided Team Pranit's nomination loss, given Farhana a captaincy contendership advantage, assigned nonsense apps to captain Abhishek, and selected Awez and Kunickaa as photographers for parties. Bigg Boss asked Nehal, from the secret room, to choose between Gaurav and Awez for captaincy contendership. Nehal chose Gaurav. Bigg Boss declared Farhana and Gaurav as the final captaincy contenders.
Week 5	Tasks	Winner – Gaurav
Week 5	Tasks	Failed – Zeishan, Baseer, Amaal, Tanya, Neelam, Pranit, Shehbaz, Mridul, Kuncikaa, Abhishek, Awez
Week 5	Exits	On Day 35, Awez Darbar became third housemate to get evicted.
Week 6
Week 6	Entrances	On Day 42, Malti Chahar entered the Bigg Boss 19 house as the second wild card contestant during the Weekend Ka Vaar, supported by her brother Deepak Chahar's appearance on stage.
Week 6	Twists	On Day 38, Bigg Boss summoned all housemates to the Assembly Room, directing Captain Farhana to a rankings board. Bigg Boss stated that, given housemates’ opinions about Farhana's captaincy had been heard, it was time for Farhana's candid opinions about housemates to be expressed. Farhana was tasked with ranking housemates based on their eligibility in the show after five weeks, using a scale from 20 (highest) to -10 (lowest). Farhana assigned: Mridul (-10), Neelam (-8), Gaurav (-3), Ashnoor (-1), Pranit (0), Amaal (2), Kunickaa (5), Tanya (8), Zeishan (10), Baseer (13), Nehal (15), Abhishek (17), Shehbaz (20). Bigg Boss instructed housemates to take the rankings board out of the Assembly Room for display.: Rank / Housemate; 20 / Shehbaz; 17 / Abhishek; 15 / Nehal; 13 / Baseer; 10 / Zeishan; 8 / Tanya; 5 / Kunickaa; 2 / Amaal; 0 / Pranit; -1 / Ashnoor; -3 / Gaurav; -8 / Neelam; -10 / Mridul; Later on Day 38, Bigg Boss called housemates to the garden area to stand in a line for a ration shopping task based on Farhana's rankings. The store room was transformed into a BB Store House containing dummy sacks of ration items. Housemates, called one by one by Bigg Boss, picked sacks corresponding to their rank (e.g., a rank of 20 allowed 20 sacks). They placed sacks in the BB godown near the tunnel and then proceeded to the bedroom. Housemates with negative ranks (e.g., Mridul with -10) had to return that number of sacks from the BB godown to the store room. The sacks remaining in the BB godown would constitute the weekly ration. Captain Farhana remained in the bedroom during the task, while Pranit, ranked 0, stayed in the garden to ensure no ration-related discussions occurred among housemates there.
Week 6	Nominations	On Day 37, Bigg Boss called housemates to the garden area, transformed into a vast sea with a dinghy for each housemate positioned in front of a missile launcher submarine. The task required housemates to nominate others by firing missiles at their dinghies; a dinghy hit by three missiles would "sink" by getting blasted, nominating that housemate for eviction. Captain Farhana's dinghy was absent, granting her immunity. Bigg Boss called Farhana first, giving her the power to directly nominate one housemate. She chose Ashnoor, making Ashnoor directly nominated. Each housemate then nominated two others by firing missiles via the radiophone, announcing their choices. At the end, Ashnoor, Tanya, Amaal, Neelam, Zeishan, Kunickaa, Nehal, and Pranit were nominated for eviction.
Week 6	House Captain	Farhana
Week 6	Tasks	BB Dino Park On Day 39, the garden area was transformed into BB Dino Park, featuring a bad dinosaur that, when angry, consumed small dinosaurs representing housemates’ captaincy chances. These small dinosaurs were kept in an enclosure in front of the bad dinosaur, and as long as a housemate's dinosaur remained, they were eligible for captaincy. A caretaker, appointed per round, was tasked with keeping the bad dinosaur happy through unique interactions. Two cages, Rajasaurus and Raniraptor, housed non-caretaker housemates. At the start of each round, Bigg Boss announced the round and caretaker. After the “BB Dino is now open” sound, housemates (except the caretaker) entered their chosen cage based on capacity. When the dinosaur's angry roar sounded, indicating hunger, the caretaker opened one cage and struck a gong. Housemates from the opened cage could then race to cross a boundary around the cage, with the first to cross, as decided by the caretaker, earning the right to feed two small dinosaurs from the enclosure to the bad dinosaur, eliminating those housemates from captaincy contention. Eliminated housemates could still participate in subsequent rounds to eliminate others. Three rounds were completed on Day 39. On Day 40, the BB Dino Park task continued with the same rules, except the bad dinosaur, now “health-conscious” due to overeating, could only consume one small dinosaur per round instead of two. During the third round, housemates disrupted the task and violated Bigg Boss rules by not wearing mics and making demands. Bigg Boss reprimanded them, canceled the task, and declared Farhana, the previous week's captain, as captain again.: Round / Caretaker / Cage opened / Boundary crosser / Eliminated; 1 / Shehbaz / Raniraptor / Baseer / Abhishek; Pranit; 2 / Kunickaa / Rajasauras / Ashnoor / Amaal; Farhana; 3 / Pranit / Rajasauras / Abhishek / Shehbaz; Baseer; 4 / Amaal / Rajasauras / Shehbaz / Ashnoor; 5 / Zeishan / Raniraptor / Tanya / Nehal; 6 / Nehal / Raniraptor / Farhana / Tanya; 7 / Ashnoor / Cancelled
Week 6	Tasks	Task Cancelled
Week 6	Sponsored	On Day 38, Danube Properties tasked top-ranked housemate Shehbaz (ranked 20 by Captain Farhana) with delivering eight unique selling points (USPs) of Danube Properties to different housemates: Patience of 1% and Drama of 99% - Nehal. Who is the one who plays single for only saying but plays double game like 1 BHK - Kunickaa. Who requires 40+ amenities because that person doesn't stay at one place as they go here once and there once - Kunickaa. Who requires ROI as they said big big things but returns are zero - Mridul. Who is the one who does before time drama, cry and wash before problems come - Tanya. Who requires a private pool as they need to cool down their anger necessarily - Amaal. Who can be sent to Dubai to live with ease as they are not able to live a difficult life here - Zeishan.: On Day 41, Haier gifted a cake to all housemates hidden in the magic zone of the Haier Lumière Series Refrigerator, India's only 4-door convertible side-by-side refrigerator, which was in use of kitchen in the house.; On Day 42, host Salman Khan sent the Being Human Autumn Winter 25 Collection Wardrobe to the housemates in celebration of Dussehra.
Week 6	Exits	On Day 42, host Salman Khan announced that no eviction would take place due to the occasion of Dussehra.
Week 7
Week 7	Twists	On Day 45, Bigg Boss transformed the garden area into BB Retreat, featuring sessions by two experts: motivational speaker Tanya and palm reader Malti, conducted consecutively. Between sessions, housemates participated in a physical fitness practical exam to earn rations. Tanya and Malti's sessions could earn up to 40% of the weekly ration (20% each), while the practical exams could earn up to 60%. Each gong signaled a practical exam, where a photo was flashed on a screen, and housemates decided how many participants were needed to replicate the figure by aligning their bodies on a stage within 1 minute. Captain Farhana judged the accuracy of the replication. After Malti's palm-reading session, a practical exam with three figures resulted in two successful replications and one failure. After Tanya's motivational session, another exam with three figures also resulted in two successes and one failure. Bigg Boss asked Farhana to evaluate the sessions. Farhana deemed Malti's session honest, earning 20% ration, and Tanya's session successful, earning another 20%. For the practical exams, housemates successfully replicated 4 out of 6 figures, earning 40% ration (two-thirds of 60%). In total, housemates secured 80% of the weekly ration.; On Day 47, Bigg Boss summoned all housemates to the Assembly Room to select the house captain among contenders Tanya, Ashnoor, Nehal, and Shehbaz. Bigg Boss first called each contender to the podium to name one housemate to be excluded from the captaincy discussion, removing them from the Assembly Room. Nehal named Malti, Ashnoor named Amaal, Shehbaz named Abhishek, and Tanya named Farhana, sending them out. The remaining 11 housemates then participated in selecting the captain. A booth in the Assembly Room provided cue cards and pens, and Bigg Boss instructed housemates to secretly write two names of contenders they did not want as captain. One by one, housemates announced their two choices with reasoning.; Housemates / Negative Votes; Gaurav / Tanya; Shehbaz; Baseer / Tanya; Ashnoor; Neelam / Ashnoor; Nehal; Mridul / Nehal; Tanya; Zeishan / Tanya; Ashnoor; Kunickaa / Tanya; Shehbaz; Ashnoor / Shehbaz; Tanya; Tanya / Ashnoor; Nehal; Shehbaz / Nehal; Ashnoor; Nehal / Tanya; Shehbaz; Pranit / Tanya; Shehbaz; Based on the votes, Nehal received the fewest negative votes and was declared house captain.
Week 7	Nominations	On Day 44, Bigg Boss narrated a story to housemates about two rival families of kids: Family 1 (Amaal, Shehbaz, Tanya, Abhishek, Kunickaa, Nehal, Gaurav) and Family 2 (Neelam, Zeishan, Ashnoor, Pranit, Baseer, Mridul). They shared a haunted playground, competing and highlighting each other's weaknesses for eviction nominations. The playground was overseen by two witches—house captain Farhana, immune from eviction, and wild card Malti, exempt as a recent entrant—who swayed on a swing attached to a tree, wearing costumes. When a witch's laugh signaled hunger, one kid from each family pleaded their case, naming an opposing family member for the witch to “eat.” The witch then chose a kid, took them on a broom along a pathway, and pushed them into the swimming pool (the witch's “frying pan”). Five rounds were held, with Malti eating a kid in rounds 1, 3, and 5, and Farhana in rounds 2 and 4. Three kids from each family played per round, but witches could choose any family member. The family with the most kids eaten would be fully nominated, while the other remained safe.: Round / Witch / Thrown / Family; 1 / Malti / Abhishek / Family 1 (1-0); 2 / Farhana / Pranit / Family 2 (1-1); 3 / Malti / Tanya / Family 1 (2-1); 4 / Farhana / Ashnoor / Family 2 (2-2); 5 / Malti / Baseer / Family 2 (2-3); Neelam, Zeishan, Ashnoor, Pranit, Baseer, Mridul were nominated for weekend's eviction process.
Week 7	House Captain	Farhana
Week 7	Tasks	On Day 46, Bigg Boss set up a captaincy contendership task in the garden area, featuring a pathway leading to a mega shoe, dubbed the "Kaptaani Joota," symbolizing the path to captaincy contendership. Previous captains Kunickaa, Baseer, Abhishek, Amaal, and Farhana were excluded from participating and served as sanchalaks, one per round. The task involved face-offs between two housemates per round along a pathway with five points, each displaying a puzzle of an ex-captain's photo. Bigg Boss announced the competing housemates and specified which point and ex-captain's puzzle they needed to assemble. Both housemates placed one leg in the shared mega shoe, and at the gunshot sound, raced to the designated point to create the puzzle on a blackboard, aligning pieces while protecting their work from the opponent. Housemates had to keep their leg in the mega shoe throughout; if it slipped out, the sanchalak ensured it was reinserted. After a buzzer, the sanchalak determined which housemate assembled the most puzzle pieces correctly, awarding them captaincy contendership.: Round / Ex-Captain / Winner / Loser; 1 / Farhana / Nehal / Neelam; 2 / Abhishek / Ashnoor / Gaurav; 3 / Baseer / Shehbaz / Mridul; 4 / Amaal / Tanya / Malti; 5 / Kunickaa / None / Pranit; Zeishan; At the task's conclusion, Nehal, Ashnoor, Shehbaz, and Tanya earned captaincy contendership.
Week 7	Tasks	Winner – Nehal, Ashnoor, Shehbaz and Tanya
Week 7	Tasks	Failed – Neelam, Gaurav, Mridul, Malti, Pranit, Zeishan
Week 7	Sponsored	On Day 45, Lakmé sent a gift hamper to the female housemates, featuring their new product Lakmé Peach Milk Perfect Radiance.; On Day 46, Being Human Autumn Winter 25 wardrobe collection was sent to all housemates, host Salman Khan's fulfilled promise from Day 42 during Weekend Ka Vaar.; On Day 48, Citroën introduced a task in the garden area, showcasing the new Citroën Aircross X car. Any one from three housemates can win the car. Housemates wrote their names and placed them in a fishbowl, from which house captain Nehal drew three names: Amaal, Gaurav, and Farhana. Each contender narrated their best moment in the house and explained why it was special. The other housemates voted for the most impactful moment, selecting Gaurav as the winner, who received the Citroën Aircross X.; On Day 49, Haier gifted Haier Mini LED TVs to all housemates.
Week 7	Exits	On Day 49, Zeishan Quadri became fourth housemate to get evicted.
Week 8
Week 8	Twists	On Day 51, Bigg Boss announced a new housemate was in the store room. Shehbaz retrieved a teddy bear, introduced as a "teddy dear," a spoiled and pampered entity that must not touch the floor or any surface, requiring a housemate to hold it in their lap, stand, and rotate continuously without sitting, lying, or taking support. The teddy dear's presence determined the weekly ration, with three ration items vanishing each time it touched something. Captain Nehal was tasked with overseeing the teddy dear's care and issuing challans for mistakes. Any housemate holding the teddy dear who let it touch a surface received one challan, and Nehal could also issue challans for other housemates breaking house rules. Each challan resulted in three ration items being cut. If Nehal erred in moderation, 50% of the ration would be cut. Malti, Ashnoor, and Tanya took turns holding the teddy dear. At the task's end, Bigg Boss announced that Kunickaa broke a house rule by speaking to Shehbaz in English, incurring one challan (cutting rajma, cabbage, chocolates). Tanya's handling resulted in one challan (cutting bread, prawns, mutton). Malti's handling led to three challans, including an incident where she threw the teddy dear on the floor, resulting in 11 items cut (rava, bhindi, watermelon, Nutella, avocado, cheese, besan, soya chunks, fish, chicken).; On Day 53, Bigg Boss called house captain Nehal to the confession room and asked four questions about the previous day's letter delivery task: (1) Was the condition that a housemate's letter could be delivered or would not be delivered part of the task? Nehal answered yes. (2) Was Gaurav giving shredded parts of Neelam's letter to her against the task rules? Nehal answered yes. (3) Was Neelam attempting to read the shredded parts secretly against the task rules? Nehal answered yes. (4) Did Gaurav and Neelam not violate task rules? Nehal answered yes. Bigg Boss announced that the canceled letter delivery task would not resume, but two of the remaining nine housemates would receive their letters. As captain, Nehal was given the special right to choose, and she selected Baseer and Ashnoor. Bigg Boss then gathered all housemates in the living area, confirming the task's cancellation, ending Nehal's captaincy tenure, and stating there would be no captain for the next week. Letters for Gaurav, Amaal, Nehal, Abhishek, Shehbaz, Malti, and Tanya were not delivered, while Baseer and Ashnoor received theirs.
Week 8	Nominations	On Day 50, Bigg Boss set up a Panipuri stall in the garden area, with stools for each housemate in front. House captain Nehal, as the stall owner, served only spicy panipuri, representing nominations. Housemates, one by one, approached Nehal to take 1 to 3 panipuris and fed them to housemates they wished to nominate, with each panipuri symbolizing a nomination (minimum 1, maximum 3 nominations per housemate). Gaurav, Neelam, Mridul, Malti, and Farhana were initially nominated. Bigg Boss announced that the nomination process required a “sukhi puri” to be eaten to conclude. Nehal received the special right to save one nominated housemate by giving them the sukhi puri. Nehal chose Farhana, saving her from nominations. As a result, Gaurav, Neelam, Mridul, and Malti were nominated for eviction.
Week 8	House Captain	Nehal
Week 8	Tasks	On Day 52, Bigg Boss announced that, with nearly half the season passed, housemates were likely missing their families. Letters from their homes were received, to be delivered via a pigeon. After the song Chitthi Aayi Hai played, housemates stood in a line below the BB sign, and Bigg Boss named the housemate whose letter arrived, making them the sanchalak for that round. When Kabootar Jaa played, the pigeon released numerous envelopes, one containing a paper with the sanchalak's name. Non-sanchalak housemates searched for this envelope. The finder could either deliver the letter to the sanchalak by opening a letterbox, forfeiting their captaincy contendership, or shred the letter to secure contendership, returning the pieces to the letterbox. Housemates finding a letter were excluded from later rounds.: Round / Sanchalak / Finder / Status; 1 / Pranit / Nehal / Delivered; 2 / Mridul / Baseer / Delivered; 3 / Kunickaa / Gaurav / Delivered; 4 / Farhana / Amaal / Delivered; 5 / Neelam / Farhana / Shredded; After Farhana shredded Neelam's letter, Bigg Boss instructed Gaurav to collect the pieces and return them to the letterbox. Gaurav secretly kept some pieces and gave them to Neelam later, violating rules. Bigg Boss reprimanded all housemates, stopped the task, and announced that no letters would be delivered.
Week 8	Tasks	Task Cancelled
Week 8	Sponsored	On Day 51, Vaseline gifted hampers to all housemates, containing Vaseline Deep Moisture Body Lotion, Vaseline Gluta-Hya Dewy Radiance Serum-in-Lotion, Vaseline Skin Protecting Jelly Original, and Vaseline Cloud Soft Light Moisturiser.; On Day 53, Berger Paints organized a painting competition in the garden area, dividing housemates into two teams. Ex-captain Nehal selected Baseer as her favorite player to pose with her. Team 1 (Ashnoor, Abhishek, Gaurav, Pranit, Mridul, Malti) and Team 2 (Shehbaz, Neelam, Kunickaa, Farhana, Tanya, Amaal) were tasked with painting Nehal and Baseer's pose, with only one team member painting at a time, though they could switch. Nehal inspected the paintings and erased Team 1's painting from a Berger Easy Clean Wall, declaring it unsatisfactory. She announced Team 2 as the winner. Nehal, Baseer, and Team 2 received Berger Paints vouchers worth ₹1,20,000.; On Day 55, on the occasion of Diwali, Rizwan Sajan, Founder and Chairman of Danube Properties, and Adel Sajan, Group Managing Director of Danube Properties, entered the house to promote the brand. They distributed sweets among the housemates and gifted boarding passes for a trip to Dubai, inviting them to visit their home after the show.
Week 8	Exits	On Day 56, No eviction took place due to the occasion of Diwali.
Week 9
Week 9	Twists	On Day 56, Bigg Boss announced a historic first for the show’s 19 seasons: a live musical concert by Altaf Raja. On the occasion of Diwali, Altaf Raja performed in the activity area, with housemates enjoying the performance from the garden area via a big screen.; On Day 60, Bigg Boss summoned all housemates to the Assembly Room, where each was provided a cue card and pen. All housemates were captaincy contenders and had to nominate two other housemates, excluding themselves, for the next captain. The housemate with the most votes would become captain.; Housemates / Votes; Abhishek / Pranit; Ashnoor; Baseer / Nehal; Amaal; Kunickaa / Neelam; Shehbaz; Mridul / Gaurav; Pranit; Ashnoor / Abhishek; Pranit; Shehbaz / Amaal; Mridul; Nehal / Baseer; Kunickaa; Amaal / Baseer; Mridul; Gaurav / Pranit; Mridul; Pranit / Gaurav; Mridul; Farhana / Shehbaz; Gaurav; Neelam / Mridul; Shehbaz; Malti / Pranit; Amaal; Tanya / Neelam; Shehbaz; Pranit and Mridul each received 5 votes, resulting in a tie. Bigg Boss asked housemates to choose between them, with 4 supporting Pranit and 8 supporting Mridul. Consequently, Mridul was declared house captain
Week 9	Nominations	On Day 59, Bigg Boss announced a Diwali-themed nomination task based on luck, titled a "chain reaction" game, where housemates’ destinies were locked in their photos inside 14 lockers in a locker room set up in the Activity Area. One housemate, chosen by housemates, started the process by entering the confession room to pick a cue card with a name. The opening housemate decided whether to nominate that housemate (placing their photo on the nominated wall for direct nomination) or save them (placing their photo on the safe wall). The housemate whose photo was revealed continued the chain by opening another locker, and this process repeated. As it was Diwali, the nomination process was limited to four housemates; once four were nominated, the chain reaction stopped, and remaining housemates were safe. Housemates sent Kunickaa to the confession room, where she picked a cue card with Gaurav’s name. Gaurav began the chain reaction by entering the locker room and opening a locker, revealing another housemate’s photo.: Housemate / Photo / Status; Gaurav / Nehal / Nominated; Nehal / Amaal / Safe; Amaal / Shehbaz / Safe; Shehbaz / Pranit / Nominated; Pranit / Abhishek / Safe; Abhishek / Baseer / Nominated; Baseer / Gaurav / Nominated; The chain reaction started and ended with Gaurav, resulting in four nominated housemates. As a result, Nehal, Pranit, Baseer, and Gaurav were nominated for eviction.
Week 9	House Captain	None
Week 9	Sponsored	On Day 56, Vaseline sent a hamper to housemates for a Diwali-themed musical evening, containing Vaseline Gluta-Hya Dewy Radiance Lotion for Face & Body, Vaseline Deep Moisture Body Lotion, Vaseline Cocoa Glow Serum In Lotion, Vaseline Light Hydrate Serum In Lotion, Vaseline Sun Protect SPF 30 Body Lotion, Vaseline Gluta-Hya Overnight Radiance, Vaseline Gluta Hya - Antioxidant SPF 50 PA+++ Sunscreen for Face & Body, Vaseline Lip Tins Original Care, Vaseline Lip Tins Rosy Lips, Vaseline Lip Tins Cocoa Butter, Vaseline Original Skin Protecting Jelly, and Vaseline Cloud Soft Light Moisturiser. After getting ready, housemates posed in pairs at a #VaselineBlockbusterJodi photo stand, inspired by Vaseline’s Ceramide and Hyaluron combination. The pairs were: Amaal and Kunickaa, Mridul and Neelam, Baseer and Nehal, Abhishek and Ashnoor, Shehbaz and Tanya, Gaurav and Farhana, Pranit and Malti. Vaseline sponsored a live concert by Altaf Raja in the activity area, which housemates enjoyed from the garden area on a big screen, marking the first live concert in Bigg Boss’s 19 seasons.; On Day 61, Appy Fizz sponsored a task where housemates sat around a circular table with an Appy Fizz bottle in the center, rotated by house captain and sanchalak Mridul. The housemate on whom the bottle stopped picked one of three envelopes from a podium, each containing a dare to complete. The three housemates who won their dares received an Appy Fizz hamper. The bottle first stopped on Gaurav, whose dare required him to choose a housemate and compete by pouring Appy Fizz into a glass with minimal spillage and taking a shot first. Gaurav chose Neelam and won. Next, the bottle stopped on Farhana, whose dare involved choosing a competitor to take turns sipping Appy Fizz and saying something about another housemate after each sip; the first to finish the bottle won. Farhana chose Malti and won. Finally, the bottle stopped on Neelam, whose dare required her to select a competitor to balance a glass on their head while dancing; the one who kept the glass balanced won. Neelam chose Amaal and won. Gaurav, Farhana, and Neelam received Appy Fizz hampers.: On Day 63, Silver Coin sent a festive hamper to the housemates containing sweets made with Silver Coin Chakki Atta, Besan, Rawa, Suji, and Maida, celebrating the Diwali season.
Week 9	Exits	On Day 63, Nehal Chudasama and Baseer Ali became fifth and sixth housemate to get evicted.
Week 10
Week 10	Twists	On Day 66, Bigg Boss called all housemates to the Assembly Room to resolve the tie in the scientist lab captaincy task. Probable contenders Gaurav, Malti, Pranit, and Shehbaz were sent to the living area, where they watched live footage from the Assembly Room on a screen. The remaining housemates received cue cards and pens to vote between the tied pairs.: Housemate / Vote; Tanya / Shehbaz–Pranit (1); Neelam / Shehbaz–Pranit (2); Mridul / Gaurav–Malti (1); Abhishek / Gaurav–Malti (2); Kunickaa / Shehbaz–Pranit (3); Amaal / Shehbaz–Pranit (4); Ashnoor / Gaurav–Malti (3); Farhana / Shehbaz–Pranit (5); Shehbaz–Pranit received five votes, while Gaurav–Malti received three. As a result, Shehbaz and Pranit became the captaincy contenders.
Week 10	Nominations	On Day 64, Bigg Boss summoned all housemates to the Assembly Room and played a video clip showing Abhishek and Ashnoor repeatedly violating house rules by not wearing mics and hiding them despite announcements. Bigg Boss asked both to leave the room and proposed that, due to intentional violations, only Abhishek and Ashnoor be nominated for eviction that week. However, under the season’s housemates’ government theme, the decision was handed to the remaining housemates in the Assembly Room, shown live to Abhishek and Ashnoor in the living area. After discussion, housemates reached a tie. Bigg Boss directed house captain Mridul to break the tie. Mridul decided against nominating Abhishek and Ashnoor. Bigg Boss accepted the decision but imposed punishment: all housemates except Abhishek, Ashnoor, and Mridul were nominated for eviction, and the weekly ration was reduced to 50%. Tanya, Neelam, Farhana, Gaurav, Pranit, Kunickaa, Malti, Amaal and Shehbaz were nominated for weekend's eviction process.
Week 10	House Captain	Mridul
Week 10	Tasks	On Day 66, Bigg Boss transformed the garden area into a genius scientist’s lab, where a formula for captaincy contendership required housemates to collect final items in pairs. Pairs were: Amaal–Farhana, Shehbaz–Pranit, Tanya–Mridul, Gaurav–Malti, and Kunickaa–Neelam. Abhishek and Ashnoor were excluded from contention due to deliberate rule violations (hiding mics), as Bigg Boss stated that captaincy requires upholding house rules. Each pair had to retrieve a specified item without using hands, placing it in a scientist’s deposit box using a four-part bucket attached to their hands. Ashnoor served as sanchalak. At the sound of “Lab ab khul gayi,” pairs assembled the bucket, received a table tennis ball, and stood at the start line. After Bigg Boss announced the item, a buzzer started the round. If a ball fell, Ashnoor sent the pair back to restart. The first pair to deposit the item earned a point.: Round / Item / Winning Pair; 1 / Teddy Bear / Shehbaz–Pranit (1); 2 / Wooden Elephant / Amaal–Farhana (1); 3 / Helmet / Kunickaa–Neelam (1); 4 / White Towel / Gaurav–Malti (1); 5 / Wooden Stick / Shehbaz–Pranit (2); 6 / Spoon / Tanya–Mridul (1); 7 / Heart shaped pillow / Gaurav–Malti (2); At the task’s end, Shehbaz–Pranit and Gaurav–Malti each scored 2 points, resulting in a tie.
Week 10	Tasks	Winner – Shehbaz, Pranit, Gaurav, Malti
Week 10	Tasks	Failed – Amaal, Farhana, Tanya, Mridul, Kunickaa, Neelam
Week 10	Tasks	On Day 67, Bigg Boss initiated a combined captaincy and ration task in the garden area. With only 50% weekly ration allocated, housemates could earn additional items through the task. At the trumpet sound, all housemates gathered at the start line. At the gunshot, three balls fell from slides, one bearing a number. Excluding contenders Pranit and Shehbaz, and sanchalak Mridul, all housemates raced to catch the numbered ball. The catcher handed it to either Pranit or Shehbaz, who decided whether to place it on their own wall (for captaincy points) or the Ghar Ka Ration wall (for extra ration items). Mridul’s decision on who caught the ball was final.: Round / Catcher / Number / Wall; 1 / Gaurav / 3 / Pranit (3); 2 / Ashnoor / 5 / Pranit (8); 3 / Abhishek / 5 / Pranit (13); 4 / Malti / 8 / Pranit (21); 5 / Neelam / 3 / Ration by Shehbaz (3); At the end, Pranit’s wall totaled 21 points, Shehbaz’s 0, and the Ghar Ka Ration wall gained 3 items (added by Shehbaz in the final round). Pranit won and became house captain, with housemates receiving 50% base ration plus 3 additional items.
Week 10	Tasks	Winner – Pranit
Week 10	Tasks	Failed – Shehbaz
Week 10	Sponsored	On Day 68, Lakmé sponsored a team task divided into Team Lakmé Peach Milk (Gaurav, Abhishek, Ashnoor, Mridul, Pranit, Malti) and Team Lakmé Perfect Radiance AM PM Duo (Amaal, Shehbaz, Neelam, Tanya, Kunickaa, Farhana). Team Lakmé Peach Milk performed a mimicry act with two members (Gaurav and Ashnoor) depicting tension between Abhishek and Kunickaa, illustrating how Lakmé Peach Milk reduces friction and roughness on skin. Team Lakmé Perfect Radiance AM PM Duo performed a mimicry act with two members (Kunickaa and Farhana) depicting the dull game of Malti and Abhishek, showing how Lakmé Perfect Radiance AM PM Duo repairs dark spots and pigmentation. Both teams used Lakmé products during their acts and received one Lakmé hamper each.
Week 10	Exits	On Day 70, Pranit More exited the Bigg Boss 19 house due to health concerns, and requiring hospitalization for treatment. His departure, announced by host Salman Khan during the Weekend Ka Vaar episode, was not due to public voting but a medical necessity, as the required care could not be provided in the house.
Week 11
Week 11	Twists	On Day 75, Pranit re-entered the house through the storeroom after a bell rang, welcomed back by Bigg Boss following his medical exit on Day 70.; On Day 77, Gaurav and Farhana were saved by audience votes. The bottom three were Neelam, Abhishek, and Ashnoor. Pranit, who was absent during nominations due to medical reasons, was given a special power as captain to save one from eviction, with the other two eliminated. Pranit chose to save Ashnoor, citing her greater contribution and capability to the audience. As a result, Abhishek and Neelam were evicted.
Week 11	Nominations	On Day 72, Bigg Boss announced an election-themed nomination process. Housemates were called to the confession room in pairs or trios, where they were presented with two or three names and had to elect one for nomination (placing their photo in the red “Nominated” box) while the others were safe (green “Safe” box). Housemates sat on the living area sofa during the process, prohibited from discussing, whispering, or gesturing about nominations.: Housemates / Choices / Nominated / Safe; Farhana; Ashnoor; Malti / Mridul; Abhishek / Abhishek / Mridul; Amaal; Mridul / Farhana; Tanya / Farhana / Tanya; Kunickaa; Neelam / Gaurav; Amaal; Shehbaz / Gaurav / Amaal; Shehbaz; Abhishek; Gaurav / Neelam; Malti / Neelam / Malti; Tanya; Shehbaz / Ashnoor; Kunickaa / Ashnoor / Kunickaa; At the end, Shehbaz brought the Nominated box and key to the living area. Bigg Boss instructed him to open it and reveal the nominated housemates. Abhishek, Farhana, Gaurav, Neelam, Ashnoor were nominated for weekend's eviction process.
Week 11	House Captain	~~Pranit~~
Week 11	Tasks	On Day 73, Bigg Boss called all housemates to the Activity Area for a ration-earning task on ration day. A Search Engine Computer was set up, displaying incomplete sentences about housemates with blanks for the second half. Bigg Boss called housemates one by one to fill in the blanks, completing the sentence about another housemate. The computer then highlighted keywords, triggering a 10-minute discussion on the topic. Bigg Boss selected one housemate to become the “voice of the computer” and speak on the topic.: Round / Half Sentence / Filler / Full Sentence / Speaker; 1 / _ Bada _ Hai / Malti / Tanya Badi Sacchi Hai / Amaal; 2 / _ Ekdum _ Hai / Farhana / Amaal Ekdum Dogla Hai / Gaurav; 3 / _ Ko _ Bulaana Chahiye / Neelam / Abhishek Ko Chamcha Bulaana Chahiye / Kunickaa; At the task’s end, Bigg Boss asked Mridul to judge on his behalf, evaluating the accuracy of blank-filling and the honesty of speakers. Mridul awarded 90% of the weekly ration.
Week 11	Tasks	On Day 74, Bigg Boss announced a musical chairs-style captaincy task on a guitar-shaped dance floor in the garden area. Housemates stood on boxes, dancing to music; when it stopped, those on the same box were eliminated. In the first round, Tanya and Shehbaz were eliminated, making Shehbaz sanchalak.: Round / Eliminated; 1 / Tanya; Shehbaz; 2 / Farhana; Mridul; 3 / Abhishek; Neelam; 4 / Gaurav; Malti; 5 / Ashnoor; Kunickaa; As the Amaal was the last standing, Amaal became house captain for the second time.
Week 11	Tasks	Winner – Amaal
Week 11	Tasks	Failed – Tanya, Shehbaz, Farhana, Mridul, Abhishek, Neelam, Gaurav, Malti, Ashnoor, Kunickaa
Week 11	Sponsored	On Day 73, Fujifilm sent an Instax Mini 12 instant camera to all housemates, along with memorable photos captured in the house.; On Day 75, Vaseline sponsored a team task highlighting the dual power of Ceramide and Hyaluron in the new upgraded Vaseline Deep Moisture Body Lotion. Housemates paired up to appeal to captain Amaal for 1 minute, explaining why they were a "blockbuster pair" like the lotion's ingredients and deserved to perform the task. Amaal selected two pairs: Gaurav–Mridul and Tanya–Neelam. The pairs competed: starting at Point A with sacks, they placed one leg in a shared sack and hopped to Point B to collect puzzle pieces, returned to Point A to assemble the puzzle on a blackboard. The first pair to complete the puzzle won. Gaurav and Mridul won, receiving Vaseline hampers.
Week 11	Exits	On Day 77, Neelam Giri and Abhishek Bajaj became seventh and eighth housemate to get evicted.
Week 12
Week 12	Twists	On Day 81, Bigg Boss called each housemate one by one to the App Room (except Shehbaz), announcing that weekly ration shopping would occur there. Each housemate was offered two choices: “Social Media Following” (revealing their current social media followers for the first time) or “10% Ration” (adding 10% to the base 30% ration).: Housemate / Choice / Status; Ashnoor / 10% Ration / Ghar Ke Weekly Ration Mein 10% Ration Add Ho Gaya; Pranit / 10% Ration / Ghar Ke Weekly Ration Mein 10% Ration Add Ho Gaya; Malti / 10% Ration / Ghar Ke Weekly Ration Mein 10% Ration Add Ho Gaya; Kunickaa / Social Media Following / Aapki Current Social Media Following 218K Hai; Amaal / Social Media Following / Aapki Current Social Media Following 5.2 Million Hai; Farhana / Social Media Following / Aapki Current Social Media Following 1.3 Million Hai; Tanya / Social Media Following / Aapki Current Social Media Following 3.7 Million Hai; Gaurav / Gaurav Captaincy / Congratulations Aap Ban Gaye Hain Captain! Lekin 30% Ration Cut! Aapke Illava, Baki Sab Nominated; Ashnoor, Pranit, and Malti chose “10% Ration,” increasing the ration to 60%. Kunickaa, Amaal, Farhana, and Tanya chose “Social Media Following,” keeping the ration at 60%. As a captaincy contender, Gaurav was given two options: “Shehbaz Captaincy” (making Shehbaz captain, with 100% ration and no nominations) or “Gaurav Captaincy” (making Gaurav captain, with 30% ration and all housemates except him nominated). Gaurav chose “Gaurav Captaincy.” Bigg Boss then announced this in the living area, revealing the options and consequences, making Gaurav the new captain while nominating all other housemates and limiting the ration to 30%. Later in a day, Bigg Boss called all housemates to the Assembly Room, addressing the controversy from Gaurav’s earlier choice in the App Room, where he opted for captaincy despite equal chances between him and Shehbaz, leading to 30% ration, full house nominations, and allegations of bias against Bigg Boss. Bigg Boss clarified that the season’s democracy theme empowered housemates to challenge decisions, noting past accusations of unfairness but emphasizing consistent equality. Housemates were not upset about the ration cut or nominations but specifically about Gaurav becoming captain over Shehbaz. To resolve this, Bigg Boss sent Gaurav and Shehbaz to the living area. Remaining housemates received cue cards and markers to vote for the captain.: Housemate / Vote; Amaal / Shehbaz; Kunickaa / Shehbaz; Ashnoor / Gaurav; Farhana / Shehbaz; Malti / Shehbaz; Pranit / Gaurav; Tanya / Shehbaz; Shehbaz received 5 votes, Gaurav 2. Bigg Boss announced Gaurav’s captaincy was overthrown by housemates, making Shehbaz the new captain. However, Gaurav’s choice consequences remained: 30% ration and all housemates except Shehbaz nominated. Amaal, Kunickaa, Tanya, Farhana, Ashnoor, Pranit, Malti, and Gaurav were nominated for the next weekend eviction.
Week 12	House Captain	Amaal
Week 12	Tasks	On Day 79, Bigg Boss summoned all housemates to the Assembly Room and announced: "This season is about democracy. In democracy, there is a fight for power, differing opinions, and the right to defeat the opposition to gain authority. To determine the captain for Week 12, we are adding the tadka of politics to BB Democracy." Bigg Boss introduced a political battle among three parties, each led by a founding member: Gaurav; Kunickaa; Shehbaz; Amaal was appointed Sanchalak (supervisor) and remained neutral, not part of any party. Task Structure -: Each party must compete in activities to earn points.; The ultimate goal: Secure captaincy contenderships.; Compulsory rule: Each party must have exactly 3 members (1 founder + 2 recruits).; Phase 1: Party Formation Founding members delivered opening speeches at the podium in this order: Kunickaa → Shehbaz → Gaurav (They openly criticized rival founders to attract members.) Amaal inaugurated three party offices in the garden area. Other housemates chose their party based on the founder they found most capable. Final Party Line-up (after enrollment): Party / Members; Gaurav / Gaurav; Pranit; Mridul; Kuncikaa / Kunickaa; Farhana; Tanya; Shehbaz / Shehbaz; Malti; Ashnoor; Party members were allowed to sloganize and campaign against rivals. Activity 1: Campaign Letter: Each founder wrote on a campaign letter (displayed in their office) why their party members were winning material in Bigg Boss.; Founders read their letters aloud.; Amaal judged and awarded 1 point to Gaurav’s Party for the best campaign.; Score after Activity 1: Gaurav: 1; Kunickaa: 0; Shehbaz: 0; Activity 2: "Ek Amaal Aur Uske Do Sawaal": Amaal asked 2 questions to each party (one question per member, two members per party).; Parties responded.; Amaal declared Kunickaa’s Party the winner.; Score after Activity 2: Gaurav: 1; Kunickaa: 1; Shehbaz: 0; Bigg Boss ended the task for Day 79. On Day 80, Bigg Boss reconvened the housemates in the Assembly Room and declared: "Yesterday, politics began. Today is the day of results. In politics, after campaigning, the verdict comes through voting — and for the first time this season, the house doors are opening for fans." Voting & Eviction Rules: Live audience voting in 3 batches.; Each party performs individual campaigning on stage (all 3 members).; Voting is for individuals (except Amaal).; Advantages/Disadvantages based on Day 79 performance: Gaurav & Kunickaa’s Parties (1 win each) → 15 minutes to campaign.; Shehbaz’s Party (0 wins) → 7.5 minutes only.; Twist: Top 2 individuals with most votes → Captaincy contenders; 1 individual with least votes → Evicted immediately; Campaign Order: Gaurav, Pranit, Mridul; Kunickaa, Farhana, Tanya; Shehbaz, Malti, Ashnoor; Each batch of audience entered, watched the campaign, voted secretly, and exited. Housemates were not allowed to interact with the audience during voting. Results Announcement: Bigg Boss brought everyone back to the Assembly Room with a locked ballot box.; Amaal opened the box and distributed vote slips.; Housemates revealed their vote counts: Housemate / Votes; Shehbaz / 28; Kunickaa / 16; Farhana / 16; Mridul / 4; Ashnoor / 15; Tanya / 18; Gaurav / 24; Pranit / 21; Malti / 7; Final Outcome: Captaincy Contenders: Shehbaz and Gaurav; Evicted: Mridul (evicted from the Assembly Room itself)
Week 12	Tasks	Winner – Shehbaz, Gaurav
Week 12	Tasks	Failed – Tanya, Farhana, Mridul, Malti, Ashnoor, Kunickaa, Pranit
Week 12	Sponsored	On Day 81, Danube Properties, in a historic collaboration, announced a royal surprise for the housemates: a luxury cruise party experience. When housemates visit Dubai using the boarding passes gifted by Danube Properties, they can participate in the cruise party.; On Day 82, Bingo! Tedhe Medhe brought the Bingo! Tedhe Medhe Chaat Challenge to the house. Two teams competed: Team 1 (Pranit, Gaurav, Ashnoor) and Team 2 (Farhana, Kunickaa, Amaal). Each team selected two members to participate. Using available ingredients and Bingo! Tedhe Medhe snacks, teams created one chaat. After the buzzer, both teams presented their chaats to judges Shehbaz, Tanya, and Malti, who tasted and decided the winner. Team 2 won, receiving a key to the Bingo! Tedhe Medhe rack to choose 3 packets.
Week 12	Exits	On Day 80, Mridul Tiwari became ninth housemate to get evicted.
Week 13
Week 13	House Captain	~~Gaurav~~ Shehbaz
Week 13	Tasks	On Day 86, Bigg Boss inaugurated Family Week with a “Welcome To Family Week” board displayed in the house and photos of all housemates dangling from a tree. Bigg Boss noted that after 12 weeks without contact, housemates were missing their families. Family members would visit one by one, but under the “Freeze and Release” game: upon “freeze,” housemates must remain motionless until “release.” Any lapse could halt Family Week or prevent further visits. Guests would enter and exit via the tunnel, attaching their photo to their housemate’s on the family tree upon leaving.; On Day 86, Kunickaa’s son Ayaan Lall entered first and was welcomed by Bigg Boss. Later, Ashnoor’s father Gurmeet Singh entered and was welcomed. In the evening, Bigg Boss arranged a feast prepared by Gurmeet giving items from store room, assisted by house captain Shehbaz.; On Day 87, Kunickaa’s granddaughters Ahana Kothari and Amaya Kothari entered through the confession room, received by Ayaan, and welcomed by Bigg Boss. Before leaving via the tunnel, Gurmeet and Ayaan attached their photos to the family tree. Later, Gaurav’s wife Akanksha Chamola entered and was welcomed by Bigg Boss. After her, Farhana’s mother Afroza Bhat entered and was welcomed by Bigg Boss. Akanksha attached his photo to Gaurav’s and left the same day.; On Day 88, Afroza attached her photo to Farhana’s on the family tree and left. Later, Amaal’s brother Armaan Mallik entered and was welcomed by Bigg Boss. Pranit’s brother Prayag More then entered and was welcomed. Bigg Boss arranged a bonfire night with Armaan and Prayag. Armaan attached his photo to Amaal’s and left the same day.; On Day 89, Bigg Boss called all housemates and Prayag to the Assembly Room, sending Pranit and Prayag out. Bigg Boss noted Pranit’s wish to meet his nephew Abeer (Prayag’s son). Pranit’s sister-in-law Kajal More and nephew Abeer More entered from the main door and were welcomed by Bigg Boss. After the meeting, Prayag attached his photo to Pranit’s on the family tree and left with Kajal and Abeer. Later, Shehbaz’s father Santokh Singh Sukh entered and was welcomed by Bigg Boss. Tanya’s brother Amritesh Mittal then entered and was welcomed.; On Day 90, Santokh and Amritesh attached their photos to Shehbaz’s and Tanya’s on the family tree and left. Malti’s brother Deepak Chahar entered and was welcomed by Bigg Boss. Deepak attached his photo to Malti’s and left in the evening.; On Day 90, Bigg Boss announced the end of Family Week and the Freeze and Release game, fulfilling housemates’ wishes to reunite with family members after a long wait.
Week 13	Sponsored	On Day 86, Asian Footwears gifted every housemate a pair of high-quality, stylish, and durable shoes to make their workouts more fun and comfortable.; On Day 88, Lux Cozi gifted Heatek Cozy Warmers to housemates selected by Captain Shehbaz. House captain Shehbaz selected one female housemate (Kunickaa) and one male housemate (Pranit) whose presence brought warmth and positivity to the house, awarding them the gifts.; On Day 89, Ching's Secret Chinese brought a chaat challenge in the garden area, into two teams: Team A (Ashnoor, Gaurav) and Team B (Amaal, Farhana). Each team searched for two cue cards hidden in the garden who had written Ching's Schezwan Chutney on them, then handed them to house captain Shehbaz and ate samosa, momo, and vada pav from a table using Ching's Schezwan Chutney set for their teams. As Team B finished first they won, receiving fiery Ching's hampers.
Week 13	Exits	On Day 91, Kunickaa Sadanand became tenth housemate to get evicted.
Week 14
Week 14	Twists	On Day 93, Bigg Boss summoned all housemates to the Assembly Room, where the Ticket to Finale was displayed in the center. Bigg Boss emphasized the Assembly Room’s pivotal role in the season as a place for solutions and paths forward. With all housemates nominated, Bigg Boss offered a way to safety and the first finale spot: the Ticket to Finale, which would halt voting for the winner and secure their finale entry. Bigg Boss noted that success has no shortcut, but this was one to the finale. Before the task, Bigg Boss sought housemates’ opinions on whether wild cards Shehbaz and Malti should compete for the ticket, or if it should be limited to original entrants. Shehbaz and Malti were sent to the living area to watch live footage. Pranit distributed cue cards and markers. Housemates voted yes or no; with 4 yes and 2 no, Shehbaz and Malti were included in the race. The ticket remained in the Assembly Room, awaiting its holder until the week’s end.; Housemate / Votes; Pranit / Yes; Amaal / Yes; Farhana / No; Tanya / Yes; Ashnoor / No; Gaurav / Yes; On Day 95, Bigg Boss called all housemates to the Assembly Room, announcing that the season’s first finalist would be decided among Gaurav, Farhana, Pranit, or Ashnoor. Bigg Boss instructed Pranit to distribute cue cards and markers to all housemates. To ensure fairness and prevent focus on perceived biases, Bigg Boss emphasized that wins and losses, fairness and unfairness, were shared among housemates. Unlike previous tasks, no sanchalak was appointed; housemates decided the sanchalak for the Ticket to Finale final challenge. Bigg Boss asked each housemate to write one name from Shehbaz, Tanya, Amaal, or Malti on their cue card to serve as sanchalak. Shehbaz, Tanya, Amaal, and Malti could vote but not for themselves. Shehbaz received the maximum votes and became sanchalak for the Ticket to Finale final challenge.; Housemate / Votes; Shehbaz / Amaal; Ashnoor / Malti; Gaurav / Shehbaz; Amaal / Shehbaz; Pranit / Shehbaz; Farhana / Amaal; Malti / Shehbaz; Tanya / Amaal
Week 14	Nominations	On Day 93, Bigg Boss announced the end of Shehbaz’s captaincy tenure and the start of the second-last week’s nominations. Bigg Boss sent Tanya to the store room, where she retrieved two stamps of Nominated and stamp pad. The task required housemates to stamp “Nominated” on the face of those they wished to nominate, with no reasons given. As this was the 14th week, Bigg Boss noted that eight housemates were strong individuals based on audience votes, granting them individuality. Bigg Boss conducted one-on-one interviews in the confession room, allowing each to nominate as many housemates as desired, with no limit and no cap. In the living area, Bigg Boss announced the results, calling each housemate to reveal if they were nominated and the number of votes received. Nominators then stamped the faces of the nominated. Amaal received 5 votes, Malti 5, Tanya 6, Gaurav 5, Pranit 4, Shehbaz 6, Ashnoor 4, and Farhana 6. Gaurav, Ashnoor, Pranit, Malti, Shehbaz, Tanya, Amaal, and Farhana were nominated for the weekend eviction.: Housemate / Votes; Pranit / Amaal; Farhana; Tanya; Shehbaz; Tanya / Shehbaz; Ashnoor; Amaal; Gaurav; Malti; Farhana; Pranit; Amaal / Gaurav; Pranit; Ashnoor / Tanya; Farhana; Malti; Shehbaz; Amaal; Malti / Shehbaz; Ashnoor; Tanya; Farhana; Gaurav; Shehbaz / Ashnoor; Farhana; Malti; Gaurav; Tanya; Pranit; Gaurav / Malti; Tanya; Farhana; Amaal; Shehbaz; Farhana / Amaal; Gaurav; Malti; Ashnoor; Shehbaz; Pranit; Tanya
Week 14	House Captain	None
Week 14	Tasks	On Day 94, Bigg Boss announced Part 2 of the Ticket to Finale task, where four contenders’ dreams would be "dashed in the river of fire" and permanently eliminated from the race. The task featured four races with two contenders each. Contenders had to cross a lava track before their opponent without touching it with their feet. The four winners would remain in contention; the four losers would be out. To aid crossing, each contender needed a helper wearing fireproof gloves to create a path by placing platforms. The helper selection was the first part: Bigg Boss announced the competing contenders, and the remaining six housemates filled blank sacks with dry grass and leaves from the garden area within 10 minutes. They weighed the sacks, and the two with the heaviest sacks became helpers. The contenders and helpers mutually decided pairings. Helpers placed platforms on the track, moving one ahead, stepping on it, retrieving the previous, and repeating. Other housemates sat aside and could declare a restart if a contender touched the track before finishing. Races started at a gunshot sound. Winners picked the loser’s bottle from the stage, placed it on a wooden plank near the pool, and used a spear to push it into the pool, extinguishing their Ticket to Finale chance. A wall with contenders’ photos lit up; winners slid a cover over the loser’s photo. Ashnoor, Pranit, Gaurav, and Farhana won their races and remained in contention, while Tanya, Shehbaz, Malti, and Amaal were eliminated from the Ticket to Finale race.: Contenders / Helpers / Progressed / Eliminated; Tanya; Ashnoor / Pranit; Gaurav / Ashnoor / Tanya; Pranit; Shehbaz / Gaurav; Ashnoor / Pranit / Shehbaz; Gaurav; Malti / Ashnoor; Shehbaz / Gaurav / Malti; Amaal; Farhana / Shehbaz; Gaurav / Amaal / Farhana
Week 14	Tasks	Winner – Ashnoor, Pranit, Gaurav, Farhana
Week 14	Tasks	Failed – Tanya, Shehbaz, Malti, Amaal
Week 14	Tasks	On Day 95, Bigg Boss announced the countdown to the season's first finalist: 4, 3, 2, 1. Contenders Farhana, Gaurav, Pranit, and Ashnoor would be eliminated one by one until one remained as the first finalist. A well in the garden area held the power to grant the Ticket to Finale but required "happiness" through a three-round task of 20 minutes each. Contenders balanced wooden planks on their shoulders with red (left) and blue (right) water bowls attached, walking a lava track around the well without spilling drops, as each drop symbolized a lost chance. Other housemates (except Shehbaz) could interfere to unbalance opponents. A round ended if a contender’s red water dropped below the green line before 20 minutes or at the end, with sanchalak Shehbaz declaring the loser based on the least red water. The winner advanced; the loser was eliminated. In Round 1, Farhana was eliminated. In Round 2, Pranit was eliminated. In Round 3, Ashnoor was eliminated. Gaurav, the sole survivor, became the first finalist. Bigg Boss instructed Shehbaz to hand Gaurav the Ticket to Finale. Gaurav was declared safe from the current week’s nominations and the new house captain.
Week 14	Tasks	Winner – Gaurav
Week 14	Tasks	Failed – Ashnoor, Pranit, Farhana
Week 14	Sponsored	On Day 93, Crax sent Crax Biggies snacks to all housemates.; On Day 95, Tide sent a special hamper to all housemates containing fresh white bathrobes, soft towels, and Tide Double Power Pack detergent, each customized with the housemate’s name.; On Day 97, sponsor Appy Fizz, celebrating boldness and authenticity, brought the "Appy Fizz or False" challenge in its fizzy style. A large canvas flipbook displayed incomplete statements with "Appy Fizz or False" blanks. House captain Gaurav flipped a page each round, read the line aloud, named a housemate, and called them forward to fill the blank with another housemate’s name. Other housemates voted with paddles on whether the statement was "Fizz" (true) or "False". Gaurav then revealed his judgment. Housemates whose votes matched Gaurav’s earned a Fizz bottle token, attached to their name on the Appy Fizz scoreboard. The three with the most tokens won a special pizza treat and Appy Fizz bottle, shareable with a favorite housemate. Pranit, Amaal, Ashnoor, and Shehbaz had the maximum tokens and received the prize.; Sentence / Housemate / Name / Captain's vote / Winner; _ sabse bada risk-taker hai, hamesha apni individuality pe stand leta/leti hai. / Tanya / Farhana / Fizz / Pranit; Farhana; Amaal; Ashnoor; Tanya; Shehbaz; _ ke game Fizz sabse jyada on-point aur entertaining hai. / Pranit / Shehbaz / Fizz / Pranit; Farhana; Amaal; Ashnoor; Malti; Shehbaz; _ sabse bold aur confident hai. / Amaal / Gaurav / Fizz / Pranit; Farhana; Amaal; Ashnoor; Shehbaz; _ ki sharartein ab thodi over ho rahi hain because they have lost their fizz. / Ashnoor / Tanya / Fizz / Pranit; Amaal; Ashnoor; Shehbaz; _ ki fakeness uski asli personality ko chhupa rahi hai. / Shehbaz / Tanya / Fizz / Pranit; Amaal; Ashnoor; Shehbaz
Week 14	Exits	On Day 98, Ashnoor Kaur became eleventh housemate to get exited from house as she broke house rules with physical altercation with Tanya.
Week 14	Exits	On Day 98, Shehbaz Badesha became twelfth housemate to get evicted.
Week 15 Finale Week
Week 15 Finale Week	Twists	On Day 99, Bigg Boss called all housemates to the living area, welcoming them to the finale week and congratulating them on reaching the end of their 15-week journey. Bigg Boss asked how they felt, then specifically questioned Amaal about any perceived unfairness, Malti about her happiness or complaints with fellow finalists, and Tanya about any memorable stories from the season. Bigg Boss noted that the housemates had answered well but that upcoming questions would be more complex and difficult, as it was time for the season's first and last press conference. Housemates moved to the garden area, seating themselves on chairs facing press reporters and journalists. Bigg Boss welcomed the media, emphasizing that the season’s democracy theme involved raising questions and answering them naturally. He instructed the reporters to begin their series of questions and answers with the contestants. After the first round, Bigg Boss announced a short break, resuming the session after half an hour. Round 2 ended, and Bigg Boss announced the press conference was over, allowing housemates to return to the house.; On Day 101, Bigg Boss stated that 18 housemates had entered the Bigg Boss house, and now only the six housemates remained. It had been a long, ups-and-downs-filled, and amazing journey, warranting a toast, but for now, a roast was in order. Listening and laughing would not suffice; the housemates had to speak and make others laugh. Bigg Boss announced Bigg Boss 19’s Open Mic Night, made extra special with three guests—Gurleen, Sumaira, and Kullu—who would perform alongside the finalists. The finalists were to prepare roasts in their own style, acknowledging their inexperience but noting Pranit More’s availability for help. Pens and papers were in the storeroom for preparation, and Pranit would assist individually. Pranit would serve as Roastmaster. Bigg Boss instructed them to start preparing. Later, housemates entered the activity area, where the BB 19 Open Mic setup was ready, and guests Gurleen, Sumaira, and Kullu were present. Bigg Boss welcomed Gurleen, Sumaira, and Kullu to the BB 19 Open Mic. With the guests, family, and Roastmaster Pranit ready, Bigg Boss opened the open mic, handing over to Pranit. Tanya, Sumaira, Farhana, Gaurav, Kullu, Malti, Amaal, and Gurleen performed in order.; On Day 102, Bigg Boss called all housemates to the garden area, where a board with five finalist slots already featured Gaurav’s photo. Bigg Boss noted that after 105 days, the finale was near, but one of the five housemates would be evicted. The five—Tanya, Amaal, Pranit, Farhana, and Malti—were nominated, with voting closed. A cauldron decided fates: housemates wrote their names on slips, burned them, and smoke color revealed results. Green smoke meant saved and finalist; red meant evicted; white meant wait. The order was random.; Housemate / Smoke / Status; Pranit / White / Wait; Amaal / Green / Finalist; Farhana / White / Wait; Malti / White / Wait; Tanya / Green / Finalist; Pranit / Green / Finalist; Malti / Red / Evicted; Farhana / Green / Finalist; Malti’s slip produced red smoke, indicating the fewest viewer votes and eviction. Her journey ended, despite her short time made impact on viewers. Malti exited through the garden gate. Gaurav, Tanya, Amaal, Pranit, and Farhana became the five finalists. Bigg Boss congratulated them, ending Gaurav’s captaincy tenure and housemates’ government, as only fan votes mattered. Voting lines opened for India to choose the winner.: On Day 102, Bigg Boss called the five finalists—Amaal, Tanya, Gaurav, Pranit, and Farhana—to the Assembly Room, where chairs bore photos of evicted housemates with crosses, and five empty chairs awaited them. The Bigg Boss 19 trophy was displayed, symbolizing their dream meeting the finalists face to face. Bigg Boss reflected on the Assembly Room’s central role in the season: a space where every housemate’s voice was heard with utmost respect, decisions were made under the housemates’ government, and questions were answered. Now, only one answer remained: among Amaal, Tanya, Gaurav, Pranit, and Farhana, who would win the Bigg Boss 19 trophy? Bigg Boss posed this question to the finalists out of curiosity, then instructed Pranit to distribute cue cards and markers. Each finalist wrote whom they would vote for as the winner, excluding themselves, as if they were audience members.; Housemate / Vote; Amaal / Pranit; Pranit / Gaurav; Farhana / Tanya; Gaurav / Pranit; Tanya / Amaal; Bigg Boss noted that the housemates’ government had ended, and no further decisions remained for BB Democracy—the audience’s votes would decide the winner. The Assembly Room’s work was complete; once throbbing with 18 housemate's voices, it would now fall into desolate darkness and eternal sleep. Bigg Boss instructed the finalists to exit the Assembly Room for the last time.: On Day 103, Bigg Boss gathered all finalists in the living area, describing the finale week as one of the most emotional in the show. Bigg Boss congratulated them on completing their journeys but shifted focus to their life stories, noting everyone faces ups and downs. To allow fans to understand their highs and lows, Bigg Boss offered an opportunity to share life graphs. Bigg Boss called each finalist one by one to the activity area, where a mirror board displayed a central line with the housemate's birth date and today's date. Finalists plotted high and low points of their lives with dates on the graph. Gaurav, Tanya, Pranit, Amaal, and Farhana completed this in order.; On Day 104, Bigg Boss called all finalists to the living area, stating that he had been listening and feeling their heartbeats. Bigg Boss noted that the finalists had been eager to see the house's journey, and now it was time for them to view their individual journeys with Bigg Boss's narration. The 15-week journey would come alive as a story. Bigg Boss called each finalist one by one to the garden area, where they walked through the entrance gate into a room surrounded by screens. Bigg Boss narrated the finalist’s journey, with photos from their time in the house displayed on the screens. The finalist then stepped onto a podium that acted like a lift, rising to a large single screen where they watched their personal journey video. Gaurav, Farhana, Amaal, Pranit, and Tanya watched their journey videos in that order.
Week 15 Finale Week	Nominations	On Day 98, during the Weekend Ka Vaar, host Salman Khan announced after Shehbaz’s eviction that all remaining housemates except captain Gaurav were nominated for the mid-week eviction process. Amaal, Farhana, Malti, Pranit, and Tanya got nominated for mid-week eviction process.
Week 15 Finale Week	Nominations	On Day 102, Gaurav, Tanya, Amaal, Pranit, and Farhana were nominated for winning Bigg Boss 19.
Week 15 Finale Week	House Captain	Gaurav
Week 15 Finale Week	Sponsored	On Day 101, sponsor Danube Properties, which launched Shahrukhz by Danube—a premium 55-storey commercial tower in Dubai featuring world-class offices, 35+ amenities, and a helipad—gifted an exclusive Shahrukh Khan momento to each housemate. The momento serves as a reminder that their journey can become a global address of power, success, and dream fulfillment, just like Shahrukhz by Danube.
Week 15 Finale Week	Exits	On Day 102, Malti Chahar became thirteenth housemate to get evicted.
Week 15 Finale Week	Grand Finale	On Day 107, during the Grand Finale, Bigg Boss welcomed the finalists to the season finale of their 15-week journey in Bigg Boss 19. Bigg Boss reflected that the house, once just walls, had been brought to life by the housemates, giving voice to its silent corners. The house would miss them, and they it, so as a final farewell, Bigg Boss instructed them to decorate it with emotions. Each finalist took a canvas and marker to their favorite house area, writing a special message and sticking the canvas there as a parting gift. Gaurav, Farhana, Pranit, Amaal, and Tanya completed this in order.; Housemate / Vote; Gaurav / Red Chair at the entrance of bathroom; Farhana / Violet Couch near Appy Fizz Wall in garden; Pranit / Two blue chairs near gym below Vaseline board in garden; Amaal / Corner at entrance of activity area and medical room; Tanya / Tree at entrance of garden area; Back in the living area, Bigg Boss noted they had decorated the house with memories and proposed a toast to the five finalists. Gaurav raised the toast by opening a fruit champagne bottle, pouring it into five glasses, and serving them to finalists who drank it.: Host Salman Khan performed a dance on Jalwa song.; Host Salman started a viral trend by filming a short video on a mobile phone, passing it to evicted housemates in a full-circle chain. Each described the next recipient without naming them. The sequence was: Salman → Awez → Nagma → Abhishek → Nehal → Baseer → Natalia → Mridul → Shehbaz → Kunickaa → Zeishan → Neelam → Malti → Ashnoor → Salman. Salman passed the phone to the finalists, who delivered solo acts before a collective group number: Gaurav Khanna: Jashn-e-Ishqa Tanya Mittal: Baby Doll Pranit More: Aaya Re Toofan Farhana Bhat: Khallas Amaal Mallik: Eyy Bidda Ye Mera Adda All Five Finalists Collectively: Closed with Dhurandhar - Title Track: Host Salman welcomed the families of the finalists, who performed a group dance to Ek Doosre Se Karte Hain Pyar Hum; Housemate / Family Members / Relation; Pranit / Prayag More; Vanita More; Satyawan More / Brother; Mother; Father; Gaurav / Akanksha Chamola / Wife; Farhana / Afroza Bhat / Mother; Amaal / Jyothi Mallik; Daboo Mallik / Mother; Father; Tanya / Amritesh Mittal / Brother; They joined evicted housemates and sat with them.: On Day 107, host Salman Khan welcomed Pawan Singh on stage. Pawan Singh introduced the first eviction of the night, noting that all eyes were on the top 5 finalists and their posters, which held their destinies hidden. These posters were in the Assembly Room, now converted into an eviction room. The five finalists entered the room. Their family members—Afroza Bhat (Farhana's mother), Amritesh Mittal (Tanya's brother), Jyothi Mallik (Amaal's mother), Vanita More (Pranit's mother), and Akanksha Chamola (Gaurav's wife)—stood beside their finalist’s black magnetic board on one side of a table, while the finalists sat opposite on chairs. The family members had to complete their finalist’s puzzle; the incomplete puzzle meant eviction, with the finalist leaving alongside their family member.; Housemate / Family Member / Status; Farhana / Afroza Bhat / Completed; Tanya / Amritesh Mittal / Completed; Amaal / Jyothi Mallik / Incomplete; Pranit / Vanita More / Completed; Gaurav / Akanksha Chamola / Completed; Amaal’s puzzle remained incomplete, leading to his eviction. Amaal Mallik became fourteenth housemate to exit the house who exited with his mother Jyothi, and became 4th Runner-up.: Dance performances of best friends were featured where Abhishek and Ashnoor performed on Ladki Badi Anjani Hai, Amaal and Shehbaz on Hello Brother, Gaurav and Mridul on Bade Miyan Toh Bade Miyan.; On Day 107, host Salman Khan welcomed Kartik Aaryan and Ananya Panday on stage. The duo introduced the next eviction round for the top 4 finalists. The finalists—Gaurav, Farhana, Pranit, and Tanya—were sent to the activity area, where a conveyor belt displayed bags labeled with their names. Each finalist picked their bag and opened it to reveal their fate.; Housemate / Status; Pranit / Safe; Farhana / Result Incoming; Gaurav / Safe; Farhana / Safe; Tanya / Eliminated; Tanya's bag contained "Eliminated", leading to her eviction in fourth place. Tanya Mittal became fifteenth housemate to exit the house and became 3rd Runner-up.: On Day 107, host Salman Khan paid a heartfelt tribute to the late actor Dharmendra. Salman shared throwback footage of Dharmendra's guest appearances on previous Bigg Boss seasons (15, 16, and 17).; On Day 107, Salman Khan announced the final elimination round among the top 3 finalists—Gaurav, Farhana, and Pranit. Pranit More became sixteenth housemate to exit the house and became second runner-up, receiving the fewest votes.; On Day 107, After Pranit's eviction, Salman Khan announced that voting lines for 10 minutes are opened, allowing the audience to vote for their favorite between the top 2 finalists—Gaurav and Farhana—to decide the ultimate winner.; On Day 107, host Salman Khan addressed the top 2 finalists—Farhana and Gaurav—in the living area, noting that the final moments of the Bigg Boss 19 finale were approaching, but their time in the house had ended. Bigg Boss reflected that the house, once vibrant because of them, would now return to desolation. The bedroom, where they gossiped daily, would fall silent; the kitchen, where Gaurav finally excelled, would have its stove turned off forever; the rooster would no longer crow; and no wake-up song or Farhana's dances would wake the house at sunrise. The soul of the house—the finalists—was bidding farewell. Outside, Gaurav's thinking chair and Farhana's rebellious garden sits would also end. Bigg Boss highlighted the "opposites attract" theory, calling Fire (Farhana) and Ice (Gaurav) two sides of the same coin: Farhana, evicted in the first week, and Gaurav, who brought her back. Bigg Boss instructed them to exit through the main gate for one last time, turning to see darkness fall on the house. Farhana Bhat and Gaurav Khanna became seventeenth and eighteenth housemate to exit the house. They then proceeded to the stage together, joining Salman Khan where he held the hands of the top 2—Gaurav on his right and Farhana on his left—before declaring Gaurav Khanna the winner of Bigg Boss 19. Salman lifted Gaurav's hand in victory, handing him the trophy. Gaurav also won a ₹50 lakh cash prize. As a farewell, Salman announced, "We will meet in the next season—Season 20 soon," teasing the new edition.
Week 15 Finale Week	Finalists	
Week 15 Finale Week	4th Runner-up	Amaal Mallik
Week 15 Finale Week	3rd Runner-up	Tanya Mittal
Week 15 Finale Week	2nd Runner-up	Pranit More
Week 15 Finale Week	1st Runner-up	Farhana Bhat
Week 15 Finale Week	Winner	Gaurav Khanna

== Nominations table ==
#BB19	Week 1				Week 2	Week 3	Week 4		Week 5	Week 6	Week 7	Week 8	Week 9	Week 10	Week 11		Week 12		Week 13	Week 14	Week 15		
#BB19	Grand Premiere Day 0		Day 1	Day 2	Week 2	Week 3	Week 4		Week 5	Week 6	Week 7	Week 8	Week 9	Week 10	Day 72	Day 77	Day 80	Day 81	Week 13	Week 14	Day 98	Day 102	Grand Finale Day 107
Nominees for House Captain	None				Abhishek; Ashnoor; Kunickaa	Abhishek; Baseer	Abhishek; Amaal; Ashnoor; Awez; Farhana; Mridul; Pranit; Tanya		Abhishek; Amaal; Ashnoor; Mridul; Neelam; Shehbaz; Tanya; Zeishan	Farhana; Gaurav	None	Ashnoor; Nehal; Shehbaz; Tanya	None	All housemates	Pranit; Shehbaz	All housemates		Gaurav; Shehbaz		None	~~Amaal~~; Ashnoor; Farhana; Gaurav; ~~Malti~~; Pranit; ~~Shehbaz~~; ~~Tanya~~	None	
House Captain	None				~~Kunickaa~~	Baseer	Amaal		Abhishek	Farhana		Nehal	None	Mridul	~~Pranit~~	Amaal		Gaurav; Shehbaz		None	Gaurav	None	
Captain's Nominations	None				Captain Dismissed	Nehal (to save)	~~Gaurav~~; ~~Pranit~~; ~~(to evict)~~	Neelam; Zeishan (to save)	Not eligible	Ashnoor (to evict)	Pranit; Ashnoor (to evict)	Farhana (to save)	None	Abhishek; Ashnoor (to save)	Captain Exited	Not eligible	Not eligible	Not eligible		None	Not eligible	None	
Vote to:	Selection		Evict			19-Min	Evict	Save	Evict	Evict			Evict/Save	none	Evict/Save	Save	Live Votes	none		Evict	none	WIN	
Gaurav	Selected		Neelam	Neelam; Tanya	Tanya	20:25 Mins	~~Kunickaa~~; ~~Baseer~~	Mridul; Neelam	Not eligible	Tanya; Neelam	Not eligible	Tanya; Malti; Neelam	Nehal (to evict)	Nominated	Neelam (to evict); Malti (to save)	Not eligible	24	Nominated		Malti; Tanya; Farhana; Amaal; Shehbaz	House; Captain	Nominated	Winner (Day 107)
Farhana	Selected		Neelam	Evicted by Housemates (Day 1)	Tanya	20:48 Mins	~~Neelam~~; ~~Abhishek~~	Nehal; Gaurav	Not eligible	House; Captain		Shehbaz; Neelam; Mridul	Not eligible	Nominated	Abhishek (to evict); Mridul (to save)	Not eligible	16	Nominated		Amaal; Gaurav; Malti; Ashnoor; Shehbaz; Pranit; Tanya	Nominated	Nominated	1st Runner-up (Day 107)
Farhana	Selected		Neelam	Secret Room (Days 1-6)	Tanya	20:48 Mins	~~Neelam~~; ~~Abhishek~~	Nehal; Gaurav	Not eligible	House; Captain		Shehbaz; Neelam; Mridul	Not eligible	Nominated	Abhishek (to evict); Mridul (to save)	Not eligible	16	Nominated		Amaal; Gaurav; Malti; Ashnoor; Shehbaz; Pranit; Tanya	Nominated	Nominated	1st Runner-up (Day 107)
Pranit	Selected		Farhana	Tanya; Abhishek	Neelam	20:48 Mins	~~Baseer~~; ~~Zeishan~~	Tanya; Farhana	Not eligible	Amaal; Neelam	Not eligible	Malti; Neelam; Tanya	Abhishek (to save)	Nominated	Walked (Day 70)	Ashnoor	21	Nominated		Amaal; Farhana; Tanya; Shehbaz	Nominated	Nominated	2nd Runner-up (Day 107)
Tanya	Selected		Natalia	Gaurav; Ashnoor	Mridul	20:25 Mins	~~Baseer~~; ~~Nehal~~	Neelam; Zeishan	Not eligible	Nehal; Pranit	Not eligible	Malti; Gaurav; Kunickaa	Not eligible	Nominated	Ashnoor (to evict); Kunickaa (to save)	Not eligible	18	Nominated		Shehbaz; Ashnoor; Amaal; Gaurav; Malti; Farhana; Pranit	Nominated	Nominated	3rd Runner-up (Day 107)
Amaal	Selected		Farhana	Neelam; Mridul	Awez	22:59 Mins	House; Captain		Not eligible	Kunickaa; Pranit	Not eligible	Abhishek; Mridul; Gaurav	Shehbaz (to save)	Nominated	Farhana (to evict); Tanya (to save)	House; Captain		Nominated		Gaurav; Pranit	Nominated	Nominated	4th Runner-up (Day 107)
Malti	Not in house										Abhishek; Tanya; Baseer	Gaurav; Mridul; Farhana	Not eligible	Nominated	Abhishek (to evict); Mridul (to save)	Not eligible	7	Nominated		Shehbaz; Ashnoor; Tanya; Farhana; Gaurav	Nominated	Evicted (Day 102)	
Shehbaz	Nominated	Not Selected	Evicted (Day 0)			Exempt	~~Pranit~~; ~~Abhishek~~	Zeishan; Kunickaa	Not eligible	Abhishek; Mridul	Not eligible	Abhishek; Kunickaa	Pranit (to evict)	Nominated	Ashnoor (to evict); Kunickaa (to save)	Not eligible	28	House; Captain		Ashnoor; Farhana; Malti; Gaurav; Tanya; Pranit	Evicted (Day 98)		
Ashnoor	Selected		Neelam	Tanya; Neelam	Amaal	23:30 Mins	~~Kunickaa~~; ~~Farhana~~	Gaurav; Tanya	Not eligible	Amaal; Shehbaz	Not eligible	Farhana; Neelam	Not eligible	Saved	Mridul (to evict); Abhishek (to save)	BTM 3	15	Nominated		Tanya; Farhana; Malti; Shehbaz; Amaal	Ejected (Day 98)		
Kunickaa	Selected		Farhana	Abhishek; Zeishan	Mridul	22:59 Mins	~~Gaurav~~; ~~Abhishek~~	Neelam; Shehbaz	Not eligible	Zeishan; Baseer	Not eligible	Neelam; Tanya; Malti	Not eligible	Nominated	Gaurav (to evict); Amaal; Shehbaz (to save)	Not eligible	16	Nominated		Evicted (Day 91)			
Mridul	Nominated	Selected	Farhana	Zeishan; Tanya	Kunickaa	14:07 Mins	~~Nehal~~; ~~Kunickaa~~	Neelam; Awez	Not eligible	Tanya; Zeishan	Not eligible	Baseer; Malti; Farhana	Not eligible	House; Captain	Farhana (to evict); Tanya (to save)	Not eligible	4	Evicted (Day 80)					
Abhishek	Selected		Neelam	Pranit; Tanya	Baseer; Kunickaa	23:30 Mins	~~Nehal~~; ~~Shehbaz~~	Ashnoor; Awez	House; Captain	Neelam; Amaal	Not eligible	Amaal; Shehbaz; Baseer	Baseer (to evict)	Saved	Neelam (to evict); Malti (to save)	BTM 3	Evicted (Day 77)						
Neelam	Selected		Ashnoor	Gaurav; Natalia	Not eligible	23:40 Mins	~~Awez~~; ~~Abhishek~~	Tanya; Kunickaa	Not eligible	Abhishek; Nehal	Not eligible	Gaurav; Farhana; Pranit	Not eligible	Nominated	Gaurav (to evict); Amaal; Shehbaz (to save)	BTM 3	Evicted (Day 77)						
Baseer	Selected		Farhana	Abhishek; Neelam	Tanya	House Captain	~~Awez~~; ~~Pranit~~	Neelam; Zeishan	Not eligible	Kunickaa; Pranit	Not eligible	Mridul; Malti	Gaurav (to evict)	Evicted (Day 63)									
Nehal	Selected		Neelam	Tanya; Neelam	Abhishek	Saved	~~Kunickaa~~; ~~Mridul~~	Farhana; Shehbaz	~~Evicted~~; ~~(Day 28)~~	Tanya; Zeishan	Not eligible	House; Captain	Amaal (to save)	Evicted (Day 63)									
Nehal	Selected		Neelam	Tanya; Neelam	Abhishek	Saved	~~Kunickaa~~; ~~Mridul~~	Farhana; Shehbaz	Pranit; Mridul; Awez; Neela; Gaurav; Ashnoor	Tanya; Zeishan	Not eligible	House; Captain	Amaal (to save)	Evicted (Day 63)									
Zeishan	Selected		Natalia	Pranit; Kunickaa	Awez	23:40 Mins	~~Awez~~; ~~Pranit~~	Tanya; Shehbaz	Not eligible	Kunickaa; Nehal	Not eligible	Evicted (Day 49)											
Awez	Selected		Farhana	Gaurav; Neelam	Kunickaa	Disqualified	~~Neelam~~; ~~Zeishan~~	Pranit; Mridul	Not eligible	Evicted (Day 35)													
Nagma	Selected		Natalia	Natalia; Neelam	Amaal	Disqualified	Evicted (Day 21)																
Natalia	Selected		Farhana	Nagma; Neelam	Not eligible	14:07 Mins	Evicted (Day 21)																
Notes	1		2	3, 4	5, 6, 7	8	9	10	11	12	13	14	15	16	17	18	19	20		21, 22	23	24	
Against Public Vote	Mridul; Shehbaz		All housemates	Abhishek; Gaurav; Natalia; Neelam; Pranit; Tanya; Zeishan	Amaal; Awez; Kunickaa; Mridul; Tanya	Awez; Mridul; Nagma; Natalia	Abhishek; Ashnoor; Baseer; Nehal; Pranit		Ashnoor; Awez; Gaurav; Mridul; Neelam; Pranit	Amaal; Ashnoor; Kunickaa; Neelam; Nehal; Pranit; Tanya; Zeishan	Ashnoor; Baseer; Mridul; Neelam; Pranit; Zeishan	Gaurav; Malti; Mridul; Neelam	Baseer; Gaurav; Nehal; Pranit	Amaal; Farhana; Gaurav; Kunickaa; Malti; Neelam; Pranit; Shehbaz; Tanya	Abhishek; Ashnoor; Farhana; Gaurav; Neelam	Abhishek; Ashnoor; Neelam	Ashnoor; Farhana; Gaurav; Kunickaa; Malti; Mridul; Pranit; Shehbaz; Tanya	Amaal; Ashnoor; Farhana; Gaurav; Kunickaa; Malti; Pranit; Tanya		Amaal; Ashnoor; Farhana; ~~Gaurav~~; Malti; Pranit; Shehbaz; Tanya	Amaal; Farhana; Malti; Pranit; Tanya	Amaal; Farhana; Gaurav; Pranit; Tanya	
Re-entered	None			Farhana	None				Nehal	None				None	Pranit		None			None	None		
Secret Room	None			Farhana	None				Nehal	None				None	None		None			None	None		
Walked	None			None	None				None	None				Pranit	None		None			None	None		
Ejected	None			None	None				None	None				None	None		None			Ashnoor	None		
Evicted	Shehbaz		~~Farhana~~	No; Eviction		Natalia	~~Nehal~~		Awez	No; Eviction	Zeishan	No; Eviction	Nehal	No; Eviction	Neelam		Mridul	Kunickaa		Shehbaz	Malti	Amaal	
Evicted	Shehbaz		~~Farhana~~	No; Eviction		Natalia	~~Nehal~~		Awez	No; Eviction	Zeishan	No; Eviction	Nehal	No; Eviction	Neelam		Mridul	Kunickaa		Shehbaz	Malti	Tanya	Pranit
Evicted	Shehbaz		~~Farhana~~	No; Eviction		Nagma	~~Nehal~~		Awez	No; Eviction	Zeishan	No; Eviction	Baseer	No; Eviction	Abhishek		Mridul	Kunickaa		Shehbaz	Malti	Farhana	Gaurav
References																							

indicates the House Captain.
indicates that the housemate was directly nominated for eviction prior to the regular nominations process.
indicates that the housemate was granted immunity from nominations.
indicates that housemate was evicted from the house.
indicates that housemate was ejected from the house.
indicates that housemate walked out of the house.
indicates that housemate was evicted by other housemates' votes.
indicates that the housemate was in the secret room.
indicates the winner.
indicates the first runner up.
indicates the second runner up.
indicates the third runner up.
indicates the fourth runner up.

=== Nomination notes ===
- ^1: The Fans Ka Faisla voting, launched on 14 August 2025, allowed viewers to choose one housemate via the JioHotstar app until 21 August 2025, 23:59 IST. Mridul Tiwari won over Shehbaz Badesha, entering the house, as announced during the grand premiere.
- ^2: On Day 1, Bigg Boss tasked housemates to vote in the Assembly Room to evict one contestant. Farhana received the most votes but was moved to a secret room to observe the house, not fully evicted.
- ^3: On Day 2, Bigg Boss tasked housemates to vote in the Assembly Room to nominate two housmeates.
- ^4: On Day 6, Bigg Boss introduced the App Room, granting access to the housemate trending most on JioHotstar's 24x7 public chat. Farhana, in the secret room, chose Gaurav to access the room, with her re-entry dependent on his choice between two apps: “Re-entry: Farhana Returns” or “Half Ration, Half Plates.” Gaurav chose “Re-entry,” allowing Farhana to return to the main house.
- ^5: On Day 9, Kunickaa was dismissed as captain after housemates voted against her. Housemates declined her immunity, making her eligible for nominations, and granted Ashnoor immunity.
- ^6: On Day 9, Bigg Boss introduced the “Room of Faith” nomination task. Housemates participated in trios, with three in red triangles at risk of nomination and three in green triangles deciding which one would be nominated. One housemate was nominated per round, with green triangle housemates able to participate multiple times.
- ^7: On Day 14, Kunickaa and Mridul accessed the App Room. Kunickaa chose “Suraksha Kawach Block Eviction,” saving her from eviction despite receiving the least votes. Mridul also chose “Suraksha Kawach Block Eviction.” No eviction occurred.
- ^8: On Day 16, house captain Baseer saved Nehal from nominations, while Shehbaz was exempted from nominations as it was his first week. Later, a nomination task paired housemates (one male, one female) to count 19 minutes. Awez and Nagma were disqualified and nominated after Abhishek blocked the Activity Area during their turn.
- ^9: On Day 24, housemates nominated two others in the Assembly Room without reasons. Bigg Boss revealed a rule violation involving nomination discussions, risking full nomination for all except Captain Amaal. A twist allowed housemates to name two others to save in the confession room. Amaal, involved in the violation, had no special power.
- ^10: On Day 28, Nehal received the least votes by audience due to which she got evicted but was moved to a secret room to observe the house, not fully evicted.
- ^11: On Day 30, a team-based nomination task was held between Team Pranit (Pranit, Mridul, Awez, Neelam, Gaurav, Ashnoor) and Team Shehbaz (Shehbaz, Kunickaa, Tanya, Farhana, Zeishan, Amaal, Baseer) judged by Nehal from the secret room.
- ^12: On Day 37, each housemate had to nominate two housemates while Captain Farhana got a special power to directly nominate one housemate for eviction.
- ^13: On Day 44, a team-based nomination task was held between Family 1 (Amaal, Shehbaz, Tanya, Abhishek, Kunickaa, Nehal, Gaurav) and Family 2 (Neelam, Zeishan, Ashnoor, Pranit, Baseer, Mridul) where captain Farhana and latest entrant Malti had rights to nominate any family members in second, fourth and first, third, fifth rounds respectively. As at the end of five rounds, whichever family members were most nominated would get nominated while other will be safe.
- ^14: On Day 50, housemates had to nominate minimum one to maximum three while captain Nehal got the power to save one housemate among nominated.
- ^15: On Day 59, nominations were carried out in chain reaction where housemate had option to either save or nominate whereas whichever housemate they save or nominate will have next opportunity.
- ^16: On Day 64, Bigg Boss proposed sole nomination of Abhishek and Ashnoor for violating rules, but housemates tied on the decision. Captain Mridul ruled against it, resulting in all other housemates being nominated.
- ^17: On Day 72, Housemates had to nominate in pairs or trio where they were given choices among which one would get nominated while other getting safe.
- ^18: On Day 77, Pranit who was absent during nomination process as a captain was given a right to save one housemate among bottom three.
- ^19: On Day 80, Live audience voted for housemates except Amaal where least voted housemate would be evicted.
- ^20: On Day 81, Two options were provided to Gaurav in App Room in which he chose one option which had its consequences, due to which all housemates except him got nominated. Later, due to allegations of bias from some housemates, Bigg Boss allowed a vote in the Assembly Room to select the captain. Housemates voted for Shehbaz, overthrowing Gaurav and making Shehbaz captain. However, the consequences remained: only Gaurav replaces Shehbaz in nominations whereas Shehbaz gets safe.
- ^21: On Day 93, Housemates can nominate any number of housemates they want with no limit and no cap.
- ^22: On Day 95, Gaurav won ticket to finale and became house captain due to which he got saved from nominations and voting lines were closed for him.
- ^23: On Day 98, host Salman Khan announced on Weekend Ka Vaar after Shehbaz's eviction that remaining housemates except Captain Gaurav are nominated.
- ^24: On Day 102, Bigg Boss nominated five finalists for winning the season.

== Guest appearances ==
Week(s)	Day(s)	Guest(s)	Notes	Ref.
Grand Premiere	Day 0	Pawan Singh	Introduced Neelam Giri via video.
Week 1	Day 7	Tiger Shroff, Sonam Bajwa and Harnaaz Sandhu	Promoted their movie Baaghi 4.
Week 2	Day 14	Ayaan Lall	Supported his mother Kunickaa Sadanand
Week 2	Day 14	Munawar Faruqui, Aaditya Kulshreshth and Sahiba Bali	Interacted with housemates
Week 2	Day 14	Shehnaaz Gill	Introduced her brother Shehbaz Badesha.
Week 3	Day 21	Farah Khan	Hosted Weekend Ka Vaar in absence of Salman Khan
Week 3	Day 21	Akshay Kumar and Arshad Warsi	Promoted their movie Jolly LLB 3
Week 3	Day 21	Saurabh Shukla	Promoted their movie Jolly LLB 3
Week 4	Day 28	Kajol and Jisshu Sengupta	Promoted their TV series The Trial
Week 4	Day 28	Sanchi Bhoyar, Radhika Muthukumar and Krushal Ahuja	Promoted their TV serial Binddii
Week 4	Day 28	Uorfi Javed	Interacted with housemates.
Week 5	Day 35	Gauahar Khan	Supported her brother-in-law Awez Darbar
Week 5	Day 35	Varun Dhawan, Janhvi Kapoor, Rohit Saraf, Sanya Malhotra and Maniesh Paul	Promoted their movie Sunny Sanskari Ki Tulsi Kumari.
Week 5	Day 35	Abhishek Malhan and Harsh Gujral	Promoted their shows Game of Glory and India's Biggest Foodie respectively and roasted the housemates.
Week 6	Day 42	Deepak Chahar	Introduced his sister Malti Chahar
Week 6	Day 42	Elvish Yadav	Interacted with housemates
Week 7	Day 49	Jamie Lever	Entertained the housemates
Week 7	Day 49	Ravi Gupta	Roasted the housemates
Week 8	Day 55	Daboo Malik	Supported his son Amaal Mallik
Week 8	Day 55	Rizwan Sajan and Adel Sajan	Promoted Danube Properties
Week 8	Day 55	Sunita Ahuja	Interacted with housemates
Week 8	Day 55	Jasmine Sandlas	Promoted her album Legal Robbery
Week 8	Day 55	Shaan	Promoted his song Tum Jo Kaho Toh
Week 8	Day 55	Ayushmann Khurrana, Rashmika Mandanna and Nawazuddin Siddiqui	Promoted their movie Thamma
Week 9	Day 56	Altaf Raja	Performed his concert to celebrate Diwali
Week 9	Day 63	Mika Singh	Promoted his song Gunda
Week 9	Day 63	Sonakshi Sinha	Promoted her movie Jatadhara
Week 10	Day 70	Tony Kakkar and Neha Kakkar	Promoted their song Coca Cola 2
Week 10	Day 70	Shehnaaz Gill	Promoted her movie Ikk Kudi
Week 10	Day 70	Ekta Kapoor and Priyanka Chahar Choudhary	Promoted their serial Naagin 7
Week 11	Day 77	Anjum Chopra and Jhulan Goswami	Celebrated India Women's 2025 Women's Cricket World Cup Victory.
Week 11	Day 77	Ghazal Alagh	Promoted her brand Mamaearth
Week 11	Day 77	Ajay Devgn, R. Madhavan, Rakul Preet Singh and Meezaan Jafri	Promoted their movie De De Pyaar De 2
Week 12	Day 84	Rohit Shetty	Hosted Weekend Ka Vaar in absence of Salman Khan
Week 12	Day 84	Jai Madaan	Promoted her show Astroverse with Jai Madaan and interacted with housemates.
Week 13	Day 91	Ravie Dubey, Sargun Mehta, Syed Raza Ahmed and Jasmeet Kaur	Promoted their TV serial Tu Juliet Jatt Di
Week 13	Day 91	Ekta Kapoor and Harshvardhan Shukla	Promoted their app Balaji Astro Guide
Week 13	Day 91	Vijay Varma, Fatima Sana Shaikh and Manish Malhotra	Promoted their movie Gustaakh Ishq
Week 14	Day 98	Mahhi Vinod Vij, Rishita Kothari and Parth Samthaan	Promoted their TV serial Seher – Hone Ko Hai.
Week 14	Day 98	Madhuri Dixit	Promoted her series Mrs. Deshpande.
Week 14	Day 98	Ashish Chanchlani	Promoted his series Ekaki and interacted with housemates.
Week 14	Day 98	Riteish Deshmukh	Promoted upcoming season 6 of Bigg Boss Marathi and announced as host of season.
Week 15	Day 101	Gurleen Pannu, Sumaira Shaikh and Aditya Kulshreshth	Performed in BB19 Open Mic
Grand Finale	Day 107	Pawan Singh	Interacted with housemates
Grand Finale	Day 107	Karan Kundrra and Sunny Leone	Promoted upcoming season 16 of MTV Splitsvilla and announced as hosts of season.
Grand Finale	Day 107	Kartik Aaryan and Ananya Panday	Promoted their movie Tu Meri Main Tera Main Tera Tu Meri

== Reception ==
The Bigg Boss 19 grand premiere on 24 August 2025 received positive feedback for its high-energy launch, Salman Khan's hosting, and diverse contestant lineup, as reported by Zee News and Times of India. The “Gharwalon Ki Sarkaar” theme, enabling housemate decision-making, and the digital-first streaming on JioHotstar at 21:00 IST were highlighted as innovative. Media outlets noted Khan's witty banter, the vibrant house design with a lion statue and “rangbhoomi” outdoor area, and performances like Ashnoor Kaur's dance and Amaal Mallik's soulful rendition. This season was being one of the best seasons with TVR of 2.2 in finale week and the grand finale day archived the TVR of 3.2 confirmed by Endemol Shine India.
