= Navni Parihar =

Indian film and television actress

- Born: Navni Chauhan; Indore, Madhya Pradesh, India
- Occupation: Actress
- Years active: 1988–present
- Spouse: Animesh Parihar
- Children: 2
- Relatives: Dileep Singh Chauhan (father)

Navni Parihar is an Indian film and television actress. She made her debut in the TV serial Mujrim Haazir as the main lead alongside Nutan and Utpal Dutt. She made her feature film debut in Hulchul (1995).

== Filmography ==
=== Film and short films ===
- Aranyaka (1994)
- Hulchul (1995)
- Ghatak (1996)
- Papa Kehte Hai (1996)
- Tulsidas
- Veer Savarkar (2001)
- Tum Se Achcha Kaun Hai (2002)
- Shararat (2002)
- Zindagi Khoobsoorat Hai (2002)
- Hum Pyar Tumhi Se Kar Baithe (2002)
- Andaaz (2003)
- Haasil (2003)
- Dil Pardesi Ho Gayaa (2003)
- Page 3 (2006)
- Lucky: No Time for Love (2005)
- Chehraa (2005)
- Shabnam Mousi (2005)
- Dosti: Friends Forever (2005)
- Corporate (2006)
- Naksha (2006)
- Good Boy Bad Boy as Mrs. Prem Malhotra (2007)
- Panga Naa Lo (2007)
- Rebecca Ryman: Wer Liebe verspricht (Rebecca Ryman: Olivia and Jai) (German film; 2008)
- Jail (2009)
- Tanu Weds Manu (2011)
- Staying Alive (2012)
- Rabba Main Kya Karoon (2013)
- Lagyo Kasumbi No Rang (Gujarati regional film; 2013)
- Jigariya (2014)
- Tanu Weds Manu: Returns (2015)
- Partu (Marathi regional film; 2015)
- Shaadi Mein Zaroor Aana (2017)
- Lalai Ki Shaadi Mein Laaddoo Deewana (2017)
- Love U Family (2017)
- Dil Jo Na Keh Saka (2017)
- Shinaakht as Razia (short film) (2018)
- Phooljhadi (2018)
- Khilaaf] (2019)
- Amway Mother (2019)
- When Your In-laws Become Your Family (2019)
- Pati Patni Aur Woh (2019)
- Motichoor Chaknachoor (2019)
- Nokk Jhok - a lockdown film (2020)
- The Wallet (2019)
- Bhuj: The Pride of India (2021)
- Justice Delivered
- Single Salma (2025)

=== Television and web series ===
- Mujrim Hazir
- Upasana
- Vividha
- Kanoon
- Tehkikaat- A ghost of John Perrira (Episode no 48,49,50) - Mrs Madhu Chawla
- Chahat aur Nafrat
- Beta
- Aahat
- Waqt Ki Raftar
- Alag Alag as Sukanya
- Sansaar
- Manshaa as Asha Kishore Khanna; Vijay and Vinay's Mother
- Tehreer, Munshi Prem Chand Ki
- Bani Ishq Da Kalma
- Kalakaar
- Awaz -Dil Se Dil Tak
- Arzoo
- Reporter
- Naya Daur
- Daayre
- Babul Ka Aangann Chootey Na
- Pradhanmantri as Indira Gandhi
- 7 RCR as Indira Gandhi
- Dastaan
- Badii Devrani
- Little Things (Season 2-3)
- Salt City (2022)

=== Ad fIlms ===
- Waah Taj
- Reynold's Bold
- Wheel
- Surf
- Ujjala
- Kinder Joy
- Pepsodent
- Body Revival tonic
- Ratthi Milk Powder
- Huggies
- Nature Fresh Oil
- Dawn Bread
- Nerolac Paint
- LG Hing
- Amazon
- Swarovski
