= Kalapi (film) =

1966 Indian biographical film

- Directed by: Manhar Raskapur
- Written by: Prabodh Joshi
- Produced by: Pragya Pictures
- Starring: Sanjeev Kumar; Padmarani; Aruna Irani; Nutan; Pranlal Kharsani
- Cinematography: Shankar Bakel
- Music by: Avinash Vyas
- Release date: 1966
- Running time: 137 minutes
- Country: India
- Language: Gujarati

Kalapi is a 1966 Indian Gujarati biographical film directed by Manhar Raskapur, starring Sanjeev Kumar, Padmarani, Aruna Irani, Nutan, Pranlal Kharsani. The film was produced by Pragya Pictures, and the story was written by Prabodh Joshi. Shankar Bakel was a cinematographer.

== Plot ==
The story of the film is based on the life of prince of Lathi state and Gujarati poet Kalapi (1874–1900), who died aged 26.

== Cast ==
The cast was:

- Sanjeev Kumar as Kalapi
- Padmarani
- Aruna Irani
- Vishnukumar Vyas
- P. Kharsani
- Pratap Ojha
- Nandini Desai
- Narayan Rajgor
- Dineshkumar
- D. S. Mehta
- Ashok Thakkar
- Premshankar Bhatt
- Ajit Soni
- Nutan
- Manoj Purohit
- Jayant Vyas
- Miss Jayashree
- Madhumati

== Soundtrack ==
Kalapi

Soundtrack album by Avinash Vyas
- Released: 1966
- Genre: Feature film soundtrack
- Length: 13:43
- Label: Saregama

All lyrics are written by Kalapi, Avinash Vyas; all music is composed by Avinash Vyas

Track list
No.	Title	Lyrics	Singer(s)	Length
1.	"Gunegari Hamari Chhe"	Kalapi	Mahendra Kapoor, Krishna Kalle	3:22
2.	"Jyan Jyan Najar Mari Thare"	Kalapi	Mahendra Kapoor	3:25
3.	"Peda Thayo Chhun Dhundhava"	Kalapi	Mahendra Kapoor	3:23
4.	"Smashano Dhundhnarao"	Kalapi	Mahendra Kapoor	3:33
5.	"Najar Na Trajvama Dil"	Avinash Vyas	Krishna Kalle
6.	"Ochhu Pade To Maafi Dai Do"	Avinash Vyas	Asha Bhosle
Total length:				13:43
