= Rakt Sambandh =

- Written by: Prashanth Jadhav; Dialogues; Dheeraj Sarna; Deepti Rawal
- Directed by: Santosh Kohle; Ashish Patil
- Starring: See below
- Theme music composer: Lalit Sen
- Country of origin: India
- Original language: Hindi
- No. of episodes: 185

Production
- Producer: Prashanth Jhadav
- Camera setup: Multi-camera
- Running time: 30 minutes
- Production company: UTV Software Communications

Original release
- Network: NDTV Imagine
- Release: 19 July 2010 – 1 April 2011

Rakt Sambandh is an Indian television series which aired on NDTV Imagine from 19 July 2010 to 1 April 2011. It was a remake of Telugu series Ratha Sambandham which was aired on Gemini TV and it was produced by UTV software communications.

The series was launched on 23 June 2010, being filmed at Kilck Nixon Studio, Mumbai.

== Plot ==
The story was based on a visually impaired woman who overcomes her difficulties and complications with the help of her father and four elder sisters.

Sandhya lost her eyesight and her mother in a mishap. After her wedding with the richest Yuvraj Jagirdar, when everybody was waiting for Shamrao, it was unveiled that he had killed himself. Then the story took an interesting turn. The show went further with each and every daughter in disbelief about their father's suicide. But the shocking news came from the mouth of Inspector Bhonsle. He told everybody that Shamrao was murdered and the suicide note was written by a man named Maruti Kamble. Nobody recognized him except Shamrao's fourth daughter’s (Shreya) husband who was named Mohan. But he didn’t disclose it to Police. He rather went to the cameraman. He asked him to delete all the scenes where he was talking with Maruti Kamble. But he didn’t know that the cameraman was also in contact with the Inspector. Then Neeraj got introduced who was the son of Ramesh Pradhan. Ramesh was the accountant of Jagirdar. Neeraj had lost his parents at an early age. Thus Jagirdar's brought him up. But the story took an interesting turn when Neeraj recalled that Sandhya was the girl whom he saw at Kolhapur and he fell in love with her. He also took some pictures of her. He was shocked hearing the news of Sandhya's marriage with Yuvraj.

Neeraj tried to cover his pain but in vain as all the family members noticed his mood. They all knew he was a jolly minded person but was in a sad mood. He decided to get over Sandhya and hence decided to delete all the pictures of Sandhya. The show went interesting as Mohan traced Maruti’s location and asked him about his deeds. Maruti told him that he was innocent and he wrote the suicide note because some people asked him to do so and told him that they would give him money. He also gave Mohan the address of his lodge where he was staying. Then Mohan gave Inspector the information but in vain as they found Maruti dead. Rohit gave some paper to Shradha and told her that he would get her father's house in his name. By mistake, Sandhya entered into a room and she brushed off a woman. She tried to speak to him but the woman was unable to speak. Then DK came into the room and told Sandhya that she had a misconception and there was nobody in the room. But he lied.

Then in a party DK’s wife Sunita was introduced and she was the same woman with whom Sandhya brushed off. Sandhya touched her hand and she realized that it was the same woman. But Sunita was unable to understand how Sandhya remembered her. Sandhya asked this from Yuvraj but Yuvraj scolded her. Sandhya apologized to Yuvraj and Sunita. Sunita learned that Sandhya had lost her father on her wedding day. DK told her that she was the reason behind Sandhya's father’s death and asked her to stay away from Sandhya. Mohan confronts to police that he did not write the suicide note rather it was written by Maruti and Shreya trusted her. DK asked Sandhya how she remembered Sunita to which Sandhya replied that she remembered her by the bracelet Sunita had worn. Sandhya told Sunita that her father was murdered. Sunita got suspicious and asked DK about it. DK tells her that Sandhya’s father had heard their conversation when she was revealing everything to DK. He asked her to keep her mouth shut.

Neeraj shifted his room next to Sandhya as Puru told her. Sunita heard the conversation of Pankaj and Sarla about money and later she stole it. Sandhya realized it but did not inform anyone. Later Sandhya confronted Sunita and Sunita told her that she had stolen the money for giving it to her parents. In the temple, Dr. Pushpa Nigam was shocked seeing Yuvraj married to Sandhya. Dr. Pushpa came to Jagirdar's house and was amazed to see Sandhya's sensing ability. Dr. asked everybody why they had married Yuvraj to Sandhya as Yuvraj was a eunuch. But everybody told doctor to stay away from their personal matters. Rohit asked Shradha whether she had taken her sister's signature to which she replied negatively. Puru told Neeraj that he had to give birth to a baby by having intercourse with Sandhya as Yuvraj was a eunuch. She told her that Sandhya would not be able to understand as she was blind. Later in their honeymoon Yuvraj called Neeraj to his room. But Sandhya understood the presence of Neeraj. Neeraj felt guilty and told Yuvraj that he would not be able to do it. But Yuvraj told him that he knew Neeraj had feelings for Sandhya and thus he married her because he thought Neeraj would have no problem if he got close to his lover. Inspector Bhonsle informed everybody that the case was shut and shifted to another department. In Jagirdar's house everybody had known about the sensing ability of Sandhya and hence decided to fool her and somewhat succeeded. But Neeraj revealed it to Sandhya.

Savita invites all of her sisters to her place. Yuvraj goes with Sandhya as he feared that she might disclose to everybody about getting fooled. Neeraj is threatened. Sandhya becomes more suspicious and hence she put her phone with an ongoing call in Yuvraj's coat to understand what was going on. From the room phone, Sandhya hears Yuvraj and Neeraj were fighting. And Neeraj told him that he was a eunuch and Sandhya heard it. But Yuvraj discovered Sandhya's plan and that she knew the secret. Later Yuvraj tortured Sandhya every day.

When Yuvraj and DK were drunk, Sandhya discovered that her father was killed by the Jagirdars. DK tried to rape Sandhya as Yuvraj wanted a child but Neeraj saved her from being raped. On the day of Sandhya father's Shraddh, Sandhya and Neeraj came to her sister’s house but Yuvraj noticed them and forcibly took Sandhya to a hill where Sandhya took control of the car and Yuvraj exited the car but Sandhya remained inside the car and the car fell down the hill. Yuvraj could not find her body but Gayatri Devi was following Yuvraj and she took Sandhya out of the car and took her to hospital.

Sandhya got her eyesight back due to this mishap. Gayatri Devi told her that she would take revenge by returning to the home but only as blind Sandhya. Pankaj discloses to everybody that he saw Vrinda in a village. They found Vrinda and ask her for help to which she agreed but demanded much money. Actually Vrinda was Sandhya but she was acting. After some time Anjali started loving Neeraj and thus Sandhya was in trouble as she too loved Neeraj.

But the show ended happily as Sandhya married Neeraj, Anjali married Amol. DK and Yuvraj were arrested and Sarla was milles.

== Cast ==
- Sriti Jha as Sandhya Savratkar / Sandhya Jagirdar / Sandhya Pradhan
- Naman Shaw as Neeraj Pradhan
- Dhruv Bhandari as Yuvraj Jagirdar
- Sonali Nikam as Shraddha Savratkar / Shraddha Deshmukh
- Sayantani Ghosh as Sakshi Savratkar / Sakshi Vaidya
- Sachin Shroff as Aditya Vaidya
- Gungun Uprari as Shreya Savratkar
- Kavita Kapoor as Prabha Jagirdar
- Manish Raisinghan as Mohan
- Niyati Joshi as Anjali
- Kishori Shahane as Gayatri Devi
- Pratyusha Banerjee as Priya Jagirdar
- Supriya Kumari as Priya
- Mazher Sayed as Rohit Deshmukh
- Vishal Puri as DK Jagirdar
- Himanshi Choudhry as Sunita Jagirdar
- Mohan Bhandari as Purushottam Jagirdar
- Rinku Karmarkar as Sarla Pankaj Jagirdar
- Adi Irani as Pankaj Jagirdar
- Raja Krishanmurti as Shyamrao Savratkar
- Bhargavi Chirmule as Savita Savratkar / Savita Patil
- Nihar Thakkar as Jayesh Patil
- Rajesh Khera as Damodar

== Adaptations ==
| Language | Title | Original release | Network(s) | Last aired | Notes |
|---|---|---|---|---|---|
| Hindi | Rakt Sambandh रक्त संबंध | 19 July 2010 | Imagine TV | 1 April 2011 | Remake |
| Kannada | Ratha Sapthami ರಥ ಶಪ್ಥಮಿ | 10 September 2013 | Udaya TV | 30 March 2015 | Remake |

== Reception ==
Hindustan Times reviewing both pros and cons stated, "The show weds family drama with suspense beautifully. Various big and small actors have been used without giving anyone any less importance. The show has a unique voice-over from the dead father. Dhruv Bhandari doesn’t come across as a debutant. Sriti Jha gets the mannerisms right. The timings of the show might mar the audience ratings. The storyline moves a little slowly. For those who’re used to quick developments, this may drag."

Speaking about the cast The Indian Express said, "Sriti is well cast as she brings a certain vulnerability and quiet strength to her character. Bhargavi Chirmule as the eldest sister is good too. Dhruv Bhandari as Yuvraj is fairly decent (very brave on his part to have chosen an unconventional debut). For a complex role like his, he does his best to bring the helplessness of his character very well. On the contrary, his real and reel father, Mohan Bhandari comes across as indifferent. Ditto Kavita Kapoor who gives the right expressions but doesn't seem to be all there. Naman Shaw as Neeraj, who's caught between his love for Sandhya and his obligations towards his adopted family, is fine too." They also gave three stars for the series.
