= Zaalim =

1994 film by Sikander Bharti

- Directed by: Sikander Bharti
- Written by: Madhan Joshi (Story, Screenplay and Dialogues)
- Produced by: G.P. Sippy
- Starring: Akshay Kumar; Madhoo; Vishnuvardhan
- Music by: Anu Malik, Ashok Sharma
- Release date: 9 December 1994
- Running time: 131 minutes
- Language: Hindi
- Budget: ₹1.50 crore
- Box office: ₹5.45 crore (India Nett)

Zaalim (transl. Oppressor) is a 1994 Indian crime drama film directed by Sikander Bharti and produced by G.P. Sippy. It stars Akshay Kumar, Madhoo, Vishnuvardhan and Alok Nath.

== Plot ==
Three sons, a daughter, and the judge's wife all live together. While his daughter Kaamna and youngest son, Ravi, are of marriageable age, two of his sons, Vikram and Mohan, are married. Somnath had envisioned his sons becoming judges, doctors, and police officers. While Vikram is a surgeon, Mohan is a Police Inspector and Ravi is now studying law and on his way to become a lawyer and then a Judge like his dad. The family have a dark secret. Ravi is prone to losing his temper, so much so that he gets out of control, and has killed someone in his childhood. When Kaamna gets raped, the family is reluctant to tell Ravi. When they do, they convince him to control himself, while Mohan gets an arrest warrant for Vinod, Kaamna's molester. Things do not go smoothly in court as the matter is put off for several months and then Somnath and Kaamna are killed in a bomb explosion. Now Mohan and Vikram handcuff Ravi on their balcony while they finalize the funeral arrangements, and when they return Ravi is no longer there. And then the killings begin.

== Cast ==
- Akshay Kumar as Ravi Pratap
- Madhoo as Madhu
- Vishnuvardhan as Inspector Mohan Pratap
- Navneet Nishan as Roopa
- Arun Bakshi as Doctor Vikram Pratap
- Aloknath as Judge Somnath Pratap
- Padmarani as Mrs. Somnath Pratap
- Ananya Khare as Kaamna
- Ranjeet as Ranjeet
- Mohan Joshi as Jaikaal
- Arjun as Vinod
- Tiku Talsania as Narayan ,Madhu's dad
- Akshay Kharodia
- Sabeeha (Item number)

== Soundtrack ==
1. "Ai Ai Aah Sorry Sorry" - Alisha Chinai, Abhijeet
2. "Bombay Se Rail Chali" - Alisha Chinai, Anu Malik
3. "Char Din Ka Safar" - Suresh Wadkar, Kavita Krishnamurthy, Vinod Rathod
4. "Char Din Ka Safar (Sad)" - Suresh Wadkar
5. "Mubarak Ho Mubarak Ho" - Kumar Sanu, Alka Yagnik
6. "Mubarak Ho Mubarak Ho (Male)" - Kumar Sanu
7. "Pehle Hi Qayamat" - Alka Yagnik, Vinod Rathod
8. "Soti Reh Gayi Saari Duniya" - Ila Arun
