= Mujrim Hazir =

- Based on: Asami Hazir by Bimal Mitra
- Directed by: Rakesh Chowdhary
- Starring: See below
- No. of seasons: 1

Production
- Production company: Samvaad Video Private Limited

Original release
- Network: DD National
- Release: 1988

Mujrim Haazir is a TV show based on Bimal Mitra's classic novel Asami Hazir. It aired on Doordarshan in 1988. The show was directed by Rakesh Chowdhary, and produced by Samvaad Video Private Limited. The story was adapted for television by writer Mir Muneer. The secondary theme "Gun Guna" (adapted from "Palkir Gaan") was played whenever Nutan's character rode a Palki. This was Navni Parihar's debut serial.

Nutan, Utpal Dutt, Rita Bhaduri, Rajeev Verma, Navni Parihar, Virendra Singh, Mangal Dhillon and others star in the show. The show was Nutan's final work before her death.

== Cast ==
- Nutan - Kaliganj ki bahu
- Utpal Dutt
- Virendra Singh
- Navni Parihar- Nayantara
- Mangal Dhillon
- Rita Bhaduri
- Rajeev Verma
- Ajit Vachani
- Mohan Bhandari
- Aanjjan Srivastav
- Shashi Puri
