= Zakhmee Insaan =

- Directed by: Deepak Balraj Vij
- Starring: Javed Khan; Shakti Kapoor; Rita Bhaduri; Aruna Irani
- Music by: Nadeem–Shravan
- Release date: 1982

Zakhmee Insaan is a 1982 Bollywood film starring Javed Khan as an angry young police officer along with Shakti Kapoor.

== Soundtrack ==
1. "Aaj Teri Aankhon Me" - Amit Kumar
2. "Dhoka Khana Nahi" - Alka Yagnik, Vinay Mandke, Hetty Fernandes
3. "Gham Ka Andhera" - Falguni Pathak, Amit Kumar, Usha Mangeshkar
4. "Kamra Tha Mera Bandh" - Dilraj Kaur, Suresh Wadkar
5. "Mai To Sej Saja Kar" - Kavita Krishnamurthy
6. "Rocky Aur Johny" - Suresh Wadkar, Shailendra Singh
