= Khandaan (TV series) =

- Screenplay by: Shreedhar Ksheersagar
- Directed by: Shreedhar Ksheersagar
- Starring: See below
- Music by: Vanraj Bhatia
- Original language: Hindi

Original release
- Network: Doordarshan
- Release: 1985

Khandaan is a television series broadcast on Doordarshan in 1985. It was meant to follow the life and times of the Premchand family, an affluent business family, through several generations. It aspired to be the first long-running soap opera on Indian television. It drew a substantial viewership and was a success, but state-run Doordarshan would not endorse a never-ending soap opera. It therefore ended after showing certain interesting episodes in the lives of the joint family consisting of the elderly couple, their children, daughters-in-law and grandchildren. Mohan Bhandari, Jayant Kriplani, Dr. Shriram Lagoo, Girish Karnad, Shernaz Patel, Tinu Anand and Uma Banerjee among others were the other actors. Direction and screenplay was by Shreedhar Ksheersagar, dialogue by Harish Bhimani and Music by Vanraj Bhatia. For both Girish Karnad & Neena Gupta, Khandaan was the first TV serial.

== Cast ==
- Dr. Shriram Lagoo as Mr. Premchand, family patriarch and business founder
- Sunila Pradhan as Tulsi Premchand, matriarch of the family
- Mohan Bhandari
- Girish Karnad
- Neena Gupta
- Sujata Mehta, daughter-in-law of the family
- Shernaz Patel
- Tinu Anand
- Uma Banerjee
- Anant Mahadevan
