= Naksha =

2006 Indian film by Sachin Bajaj

- Theatrical release poster
- Directed by: Sachin Bajaj
- Screenplay by: Milap Zaveri; Tushar Hiranandani; Sachin Bajaj
- Dialogues by: Milap Zaveri
- Story by: Milap Zaveri; Tushar Hiranandani; Sachin Bajaj
- Produced by: Akshay Bajaj
- Starring: Sunny Deol; Vivek Oberoi; Sameera Reddy; Jackie Shroff
- Narrated by: Anil Kapoor
- Cinematography: Vijay Arora
- Edited by: Sanjay Sankla
- Music by: Songs: Pritam; Score: Salim–Sulaiman
- Production company: Om Films Pvt. Ltd.
- Distributed by: Venus Worldwide Entertainment Ltd
- Release date: 8 September 2006
- Running time: 126 minutes
- Country: India
- Language: Hindi

Naksha (transl. Map) is a 2006 Indian Hindi-language action-adventure film directed by Sachin Bajaj. The film stars Sunny Deol, Vivek Oberoi, Sameera Reddy and Jackie Shroff. It was released theatrically on 8 September 2006, and was a commercial failure. It is loosely based on the 2003 film The Rundown starring Dwayne Johnson.

== Plot ==
Youngster Vicky Malhotra (Vivek Oberoi) lives with his mother (Navni Parihar). A lawyer shows up to speak with his mother about her late husband's old bungalow in the Uttarakhand hills. Vicky arrives at the bungalow and discovers a secret cache behind one of the photographs. And in the cache lies a replica of a map, made by his father who was once killed unlocking a mystery of treasure. Eventually, some of his father's murderers discover Vicky, and abduct him. In the meantime, Vicky's mother visits her husband's first wife (Suhasini Mulay). Her husband's son by this wife, Veer Malhotra (Sunny Deol), is a Range Forest Officer in Uttarakhand. Veer is Vicky's half brother. Vicky's mother requests Veer's mother to seek Veer's help in finding Vicky and bringing him back, alive. At the same time, the thugs bring Vicky to Baali. As Baali is about to have Vicky executed, Veer drops in and rescues Vicky. Determined to obtain the map at any cost, Baali's men give chase to Veer and Vicky: the pursuit takes them through the dense jungles of Uttarakhand to the foothills of the Himalayas. They rescue Riya (Sameera Reddy) from a river rafting accident. Baali and his men capture Veer and Vicky, and slaughter the pygmies. Baali reveals that the map describes the location of a powerful device: the armour and earrings of the historical warrior Karna (of the Mahabharata). This armour will make the wearer invincible and all-powerful. Veer and Vicky escape. They arrive at the final destination, only to find that Baali has beaten them to it. Endowed with divine strength, the evil Baali easily subdues Veer and proceeds to pin a defenceless Vicky to a wall and brutally beats him. Veer, coming back to his senses exploit the flaw that the armour needs sunlight for its powers, which are lost at sunset. Based on the historical fact that The Sun is the father of Karna and defeats Baali and restore the armour. They escape the temple just in time before it comes crashing down, thus sealing it off forever.

== Cast ==
- Sunny Deol as RFO Veer Malhotra
- Vivek Oberoi as Vicky Malhotra – Veer's younger step-brother
- Sameera Reddy as Riya – Vicky's girlfriend
- Jackie Shroff as Baali
- Suhasini Mulay as Veer's mother – Veer's mother
- Navni Parihar as Vicky's mother – Vicky's mother

== Music and soundtrack ==
Naksha

Soundtrack album by Pritam
- Released: 24 July 2006 (Digital Release); 08 September 2006 (Film Release)
- Genre: Film soundtrack
- Length: 42:54
- Language: Hindi
- Label: Saregama
- Producer: Pritam

Pritam chronology
| Ankahee (2006) | Naksha (2006) | Pyaar Ke Side Effects (2006) |

The background score of the movie was provided by Salim–Sulaiman. The music for the film’s songs was composed by Pritam. The lyrics of the songs were penned by Sameer, apart from the song "U n I", which was penned by Mayur Puri. The album consisting of 11 tracks was released by Saregama on 24 July 2006.

| No. | Title | Singer(s) | Length |
|---|---|---|---|
| 1. | "Shake It" | Suzanne D'Mello, Kailash Kher & Indee | 5:07 |
| 2. | "Yaara Ve" | Pritam & Abhishek Nailwal | 4:33 |
| 3. | "Lets Do Balle Balle" (Lyrics by Mayur Puri) | Sonu Nigam | 3:44 |
| 4. | "Jat Yamla" | Sonu Nigam & Shreya Ghoshal | 4:28 |
| 5. | "Nasha" | Pritam & Alisha Chinai | 4:35 |
| 6. | "U&I: Dil Se Mile Dil" (Lyrics by Mayur Puri) | KK & Pritam | 3:44 |
| 7. | "Shake It (Dhol Club Mix)" | Suzanne D'Mello & Kailash Kher | 4:12 |
| 8. | "Yaara Ve (Tumbi House Mix)" | Zero dB, Abhishek Nailwal & Kailash Kher | 3:35 |
| 9. | "Jat Yamla (Remix)" | Sonu Nigam & Shreya Ghoshal | 3:51 |
| 10. | "Shake Shake (All Ladies in the House)" | Indee | 1:35 |
| 11. | "U&I" (Lyrics by Mayur Puri) | Labh Janjua, Rana Mazumder | 3:30 |
| Total length: | | | 42:54 |
