= Mohan Bhandari =

Indian television actor (1937–2015)

- Born: 31 July 1947; Sangrur, Punjab, British India
- Died: 24 September 2015 (aged 78); Mumbai, Maharashtra, India
- Occupations: Actor, producer
- Years active: 1981–2011
- Children: Dhruv Bhandari

Mohan Bhandari (31 July 1937 – 24 September 2015) was an Indian actor who featured in several popular TV serials such as Saat Phere – Saloni Ka Safar.

== Acting career ==
Mohan Bhandari has been a part of hit TV shows like Khandaan, Chunauti, Mujrim Hazir, Parampara, Abhimaan, Babul Ki Duwayen Leti Jaa, Kittie Party, Saat Phere – Saloni Ka Safar. He was one of the busiest TV actors during the 1980s and 1990s. He was next seen in the TV industry in 2005, in a popular Zee TV show Saat Phere – Saloni Ka Safar, in which he played Narpat Singh, the father of the female protagonist, Saloni Singh. He also appeared in Baa Bahoo Aur Baby (2005-2010) as Mr. Raichura, Leela's father and in Rakt Sambandh (2010) as Purushottam Jagirdar.

== Early and personal life ==
He worked for The State Bank of India. His son Dhruv Bhandari is also a TV actor. In his personal life, Mohan experienced both success and difficult times.

== Death ==
Mohan was battling a brain tumour, and died after suffering brain hemorrhage in September 2015.

== Filmography ==
Year	Film	Role
1981	Akriet	A.C.P.
1984	Party	Naren
1987	Pratighaat	Inspector Ajay Srivastav
1988	Falak	Advocate Ravi Verma
1990	Thriyathri	
1992	Benaam Rishte	
1992	Yalgaar	Inspector Deepak Kaul
1992	Naseebwala	Ashok
1994	Beta Ho To Aisa	Advocate Chander
1998	Yeh Aashiqui Meri	K. C. Mehra
2000	Bawandar	
2003	Khel – No Ordinary Game	Commissioner Of Police
2005	Paheli	Thakur
2005	Mangal Pandey: The Rising	
2009	42 Kms.	Mr. Mitra
2011	Tell Me O Kkhuda	Diwanji
2015	Zara Si Bhool A Small Mistake	Ajay Arora

== Television ==
Year	Serial	Role	Channel
	Jeevan Mrityu		
	Mile Sur Mera Tumhara		
	Gumraah		
1985	Khandaan		DD National
1987–1988	Chunauti		DD National
1988	Mujrim Hazir		DD National
1991	Mrignayanee		
1993–1997	Parampara	Naresh Malhotra	Zee TV
1994–1995	Humrahi		DD National
1996	Karz		Zee TV
1996–1997	Pathjhad		
1997	Raja Aur Rancho		DD Metro
1997	Saturday Suspense – Nightmare	Episode 33	Zee TV
1999–2000	Abhimaan	Mohan Kumar Chauhan	DD National
1999–2000	Pal Chhin		Star Plus
2000–2001	Tanhaiyaan		B4U
2000–2001	Babul Ki Duwayen Leti Jaa	Renu's father	Zee TV
2002–2004	Kittie Party		Zee TV
2003–2009	Ehsaas		DD National
2005–2009	Saat Phere – Saloni Ka Safar	Narpat Singh	Zee TV
2007	Jeena Isi Ka Naam Hai	Guest (Season 2 – Episode 22)	Zee TV
2007	Virrudh	Veerendra Raisinghania	Sony Entertainment Television
2007–2008	Main Aisi Kyunn Hoon	Mr. Oberoi	Sahara One
2008	Baa Bahoo Aur Baby	Mr. Raichura	Star Plus
2010–2011	Rakt Sambandh	Purushottam Jagirdar	NDTV Imagine
