= Rita Bhaduri =

Indian actress (1955–2018)

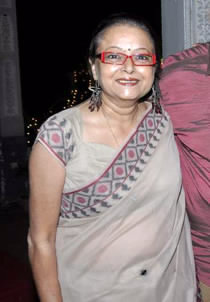
- Bhaduri in December 2012
- Born: 4 November 1955; Lucknow, Uttar Pradesh, India
- Died: 17 July 2018 (aged 62); Mumbai, Maharashtra, India
- Occupations: Film actress, Television actress
- Years active: 1968–2018

Rita Bhaduri (4 November 1955 – 17 July 2018) was an Indian film and television actress. She also worked in Gujarati cinema. She is sometimes mistaken for Rita Bhaduri, sister of actress Jaya Bachchan and wife of actor Rajeev Verma.

== Career ==
She initially appeared as a supporting actress in various Bollywood films during the 1970s, 1980s, and 1990s.

She was from the 1973 batch of the Film and Television Institute of India (FTII), Pune and her batch included actress, Zarina Wahab.

She had a supporting role as Julie's best friend in Julie (1975), where the song "Yeh Raatein Nayi Purani" was picturized on her. Her landmark role was in Malayalam film Kanyakumari opposite Kamal Hasan.

She was cast in 1976 Gujarati film Lakho Phulani which was hit and she continued to work in the Gujarati cinema for the next 8 years and became a leading actress of it.

She was most known for Sawan Ko Aane Do a 1979 Rajshri Productions film and Raja (1995) for which she received a Filmfare Award nomination for Best Supporting Actress. Later her serial Grihalakshmi Ka Jinn was famous in 1995 to 1997 period. In 1996 she worked in Pyar Zindagi Hai along with Naveen Nischol and Raj Mohammed this was shot in Hyderabad.

Rita Bhaduri played the role of grandmother in the serial Nimki Mukhiya. Her last role was in Nimki Mukhiya.

== Death ==
She died in Mumbai at the age of 62 while being treated at Mumbai's Sujay Hospital in Vile Parle for a kidney ailment.

== Filmography ==
Year	Film	Language	Role	Notes
1968	Teri Talash Mein	Hindi		
1974	Kanyakumari	Malayalam	Parvathi	
1974	Aaina	Hindi	Poorna R. Shastri	
1975	Dimple	Hindi		
1975	Julie	Hindi	Usha Bhattacharya	
1976	Lakho Phulani	Gujarati		
1976	Udhar Ka Sindur	Hindi	Sudha – Premnath's sister	
1977	Anurodh	Hindi	Anju	
1977	Kulvadhu	Gujarati		
1977	Din Amader	Bengali		
1977	Gher Gher Matina Chula	Gujarati		
1977	Pratima Aur Paayal	Hindi		
1978	Naag Devta	Hindi		
1978	Mota Gharni Vahu	Gujarati		
1978	Khoon Ki Pukaar	Hindi	Rani	
1978	Vishwanath	Hindi	Munni	
1978	College Girl	Hindi		
1978	Bhagyalakshmi	Gujarati		
1979	Dikri Ane Gai Dore Tiva Jaye	Gujarati		
1979	Kashino Dikro	Gujarati		
1979	Sawan Ko Aane Do	Hindi	Gitanjali	
1979	Nagin Aur Suhagan	Hindi	Gauri J. Singh / Kamla	
1979	Gopal Krishna	Hindi	Yashoda	
1979	Shyamla	Hindi		
1979	Raadha Aur Seeta	Hindi	Raadha S. Saxena	
1979	Mutiyar	Punjabi		
1979	Mahi Munda	Punjabi		
1980	Khanjar	Hindi		
1980	Diyar Bhojai	Gujarati		
1980	Akhand Chudlo	Gujarati		
1980	Vaya Viramgam	Gujarati		
1980	Hum Nahin Sudherenge	Hindi		
1980	Unees-Bees	Hindi		
1980	Gunehgaar	Hindi		
1980	Gehrayee	Hindi	Chenni	
1981	Garvi Naar Gujaratan	Gujarati		
1981	Jagya Tyathi Sawaar	Gujarati		
1981	Alakh Niranjan	Gujarati		
1981	Akhand Saubhagyawati	Gujarati		
1981	Woh Phir Nahin Aaye	Hindi	Reeta Bhaduri	
1982	Chalti Ka Naam Zindagi	Hindi		
1982	Bezubaan	Hindi	Revati (Meerabai)	
1982	Peethi Pili Ne Rang Rato	Gujarati		
1982	Jugal Jodi	Gujarati		
1982	Apne Paraye	Hindi		
1982	Zakhmee Insaan	Hindi		
1982	Sati Aur Bhagwan	Hindi		
1983	Nastik	Hindi	Shanti	
1983	Saacho Sukh Saasarivama	Gujarati		
1983	Kanku Ni Kimat	Gujarati		
1983	Ek Din Bahu Ka	Hindi		
1984	Maya Bazaar	Hindi	Surekha	
1984	Maa Mane Sambhare Che	Gujarati		
1984	Maa Na Aansu	Gujarati		
1985	Phoolan Devi	Hindi	Phoolan	
1985	Preet Na Karsho Koi	Gujarati		
1986	Main Balwan	Hindi	Geeta, Tony's mother	
1986	Kanya Viday	Gujarati		
1987	Diljalaa	Hindi	Dead child's mother	
1988	Ghar Mein Ram Gali Mein Shyam	Hindi	Mrs. Dharamchand	
1988	Rama O Rama	Hindi	Monu's mother	
1989	Sindoor Aur Bandook	Hindi		
1990	Naya Khoon	Hindi	Sapna Srivastav	
1990	Nehru: The Jewel of India	English		
1990	Jungle Love	Hindi	Rani's mother	
1990	Ghar Ho To Aisa	Hindi	Kanchan	
1990	Teri Talash Mein	Hindi	Shanta D. Sandhu	
1991	Ayee Milan Ki Raat	Hindi		
1991	Khooni Panja	Hindi		
1991	Kasam Kali Ki	Hindi	Daku Bhagvathi	
1991	House No. 13	Hindi	Shanti	
1991	Love	Hindi	Stella Pinto	
1992	Beta	Hindi	Neeta	
1992	Ajeeb Dastaan Hai Yeh	Hindi	School teacher	
1992	Ghar Jamai	Hindi	Nirmala	
1992	Tilak	Hindi		
1992	Yudhpath	Hindi	Mrs. Choudhary	
1993	Anth	Hindi	Priya's mother	
1993	Insaniyat Ke Devta	Hindi	Sumitradevi	
1993	Aashik Awara	Hindi	Gayetri	
1993	Apaatkaal	Hindi	Mrs. Siddhu	
1993	Game	Hindi	Vikram's mother	
1993	Rang	Hindi	Mrs. Joshi	
1993	Dalaal	Hindi	Mrs. Djun-Djun Wala	
1994	Kabhi Haan Kabhi Naa	Hindi	Mary Sullivan	
1994	Stuntman	Hindi	Reena's mother	
1995	Raja	Hindi	Sarita Garewal	
1995	Maa Ki Mamta	Hindi	Shanti	
1995	Inteqam Ke Sholay	Hindi		
1995	Dance Party	Hindi	Mrs. Lajjo Sharma	
1995	Aatank Hi Aatank	Hindi	Mrs. Shiv Charan Sharma	
1996	Pyar Zindagi Hai	Hindi		
1996	Khoon Ki Pyasi	Hindi	Parvati	
1997	Virasat	Hindi	Mausi	
1997	Hero No. 1	Hindi	Mrs. Laxmi Vidya Nath	
1997	Tamanna	Hindi	Mother Superior	
1998	Jaane Jigar	Hindi	Mrs. Prem Kishan	
1999	Hote Hote Pyar Ho Gaya	Hindi	Asha	
2000	Kya Kehna	Hindi	Ajay's mother	
2001	Maru Ghar Kya Chhe	Gujarati		
2002	Mulaqaat	Hindi	Mrs. Patkar	
2002	Dil Vil Pyar Vyar	Hindi		
2003	Main Madhuri Dixit Banna Chahti Hoon	Hindi	Kalavati	
2012	Kevi Rite Jaish	Gujarati	Old lady	

== Television ==
Title	Role	Channel
Bante Bigadte	Dulaari	Doordarshan
Manzil	Mousi	Doordarshan
Nimki Mukhiya	Daadi	Star Bharat
Sanjivani - A Medical Boon	Dr. Rahul Mehra's paternal grandmother	Star Plus
Kaajjal	Bimmo Bua	Sony TV
Sarabhai vs Sarabhai	Ilaben	STAR One
Kkoi Dil Mein Hai	Asha's mother	Sony TV
Zameen Aasman	Shanno	
Girja Devi	Housewife	Zee TV
Hudd Kar Di	Kiran/Beeji	Zee TV
Saas v/s Bahu	Herself: Contestant	Sahara One
Hum Sab Baraati	Maya	Zee TV
Ek Mahal Ho Sapno Ka	Faiba	Sony TV
Thoda Hai Thode Ki Zaroorat Hai		Sony TV
Amanat	Gayatri Kapoor	Zee TV
Grihalakshmi Ka Jinn	Grihalakshmi	Zee TV (1994–97) with Raj Zutshi as Jinn
Gopaljee	Rukmani	Zee TV (1996)
Choti Bahu	Shantidevi Purohit	Zee TV
Hasratein	Savi's Aunt	Zee TV
Mujrim Hazir		Doordarshan
Kumkum	Rajeshwari Wadhwa	Star Plus
Khichdi	Hemlata	Star Plus
Bible Ki Kahaniya	Deborah	DD National
Bhagonwali-Baante Apni Taqdeer	Ahilya Devi (Nani)	Zee TV
Rishtey (Season 1)		Zee TV
Krishnaben Khakhrawala	Santu Baa	Sony TV
Chunauti		DD National
Mrs. Kaushik Ki Paanch Bahuein	Naani	Zee TV
Bani - Ishq Da Kalma	Biji	Colors and Rishtey
Aaj Ki Housewife Hai... Sab Jaanti Hai	Sona's grandma	Zee TV
Ek Nayi Pehchaan	Daadi maa	Sony TV
Bhagyalakshmi	Shanti Shukla; Murlimanohar's wife; Rajendra and Vijendra's mother; Bhoomi, Avni and Varun's grandmother	&TV
Mohi	Vinay's mom	Star Plus
Josh aur Shakti... Jeevan ke khel	Suman Walia (Nanny ji)	Zee TV
