= Pranlal Kharsani =

Indian actor (1926 – 2016)

- Born: 19 June 1926; Bhatwada near Kalol, British India
- Died: 20 May 2016 (aged 89); Ahmedabad, Gujarat, India
- Occupation: Actor

Pranlal Kharsani (19 June 1926 – 20 May 2016), better known by his stage name P. Kharsani, was a Gujarati stage, television and film actor.

== Biography ==
Pranlal Devjibhai Kharsani was born on 19 June 1926 in Bhatwada area near Kalol, Gujarat. He was known for his comic roles but had played other characters also. He was active in films from 1958 to 2008 and for 60 years in theatre. He acted in about hundred Gujarati films and television serials and more than 75 plays. He had written, directed and produced several plays. He died on 20 May 2016 following kidney disease in Ahmedabad.

His memoirs, P. Kharsani no Vesh, were published in June 2015.

== Recognition ==
He had received several awards and felicitations. He received the Best Actor Award for three consecutive years from 1955 to 1957 from Bombay State government, the Gaurav Puraskar from Gujarat State government in 1989, the Pandit Omkarnath Thakur Award in 1996, the award from the Gujarat Film Development Corporation in 1997, a public felicitation by Ahmedabad Municipal Corporation in 2013, the Natraj Award in April 2016.

== Selected plays ==
- Patta ni Jod (1958)
- Malela Jeev
- Parnya Chhata Kunvara
- Aram Rajya (Bhavai)
- Chitthi
- Padada Pachhal
- Hu Kaik Kari Besish
- Maf Karjo, Aa Natak Nahi Thay
- Akhil Brahmand Ma Ek Tu Stree Khari
- Panch Minute Ni Paranetar
- Ranchhode Rann Chhodyu
- Rajane Game Te Rani
- Mamaji No Morcho

== Selected filmography ==
- Kalapi (1966)
- Madi Jaya nu Mameru
- Nari Tu Narayani
- Lakho Phulani
- Vir Mangdavalo (1976)
- Goral Garasani
- Narmadane Kanthe
- Bhathiji Maharaj
- Mena Gurjari
- Nasib ni Balihari
- Preet Pangre Chori Chori
- Bhav ni bhavai
- Miya Fuski 007
