= Pratima Aur Paayal =

Pratima Aur Paayal is an Indian Hindi-language musical drama film directed by Sharan Agrawal starring Rita Bhaduri and Sachin Pilgaonkar. This film was released in 1977 under the banner of Shivam Pictures.

== Cast ==
- Sachin Pilgaonkar
- Rita Bhaduri
- Sarika
- Om Shivpuri
- Bhaskar Shukla
- Mona Bhaskar

== Music ==
1. "Suna Hai Jeewan Mera Charo Taraf HaiAndhera" – Bappi Lahiri
2. "Meri Payal Ki Jhankar" – Lata Mangeshkar
3. "Kala Kala Ho Tum Sakar" – Manna Dey, Aarti Mukherjee
4. "Sapno Ki Nav Lekar Hawaao" – Jaspal Singh, Aarti Mukherjee
5. "Mai Priyatam Adha Ang" – Manna Dey, Aarti Mukherjee
6. "Mangni Ko Barso Hue" – Preeti Sagar, Bappi Lahiri
7. "Bina Putar Ke Kul Ka Deepak" – Pankaj Bakshi
