= Abhimaan (TV series) =

Indian drama television series

Abhimaan (translation: Pride) is a television series produced by Siddhant Cinevision, broadcast on Doordarshan in 1999–2000.

== Cast ==
- Kanwaljeet Singh as Mr. KK Sehgal : A politician; Rajeshwari's husband; Naresh and Aishwarya's father; Dolly and Jaydev's father–in–law
- Mohan Bhandari as Mohan Kumar Chauhan: An industrialist; Sukanya's husband; Sanjay's father; Anita's boyfriend
- Kishori Shahane as Sukanya Mohan Kumar Chauhan: Mohan's wife; Sanjay's mother
- Kabir Sadanand as Sanjay Chauhan: Mohan and Sukanya's son
- Govind Namdev as Police Commissioner CR Tyagi: Dolly's father; Naresh's father–in–law
- Arundhati Ganorkar as Journalist Kanak Sharma
- Sonam Malhotra as Aishwarya Sehgal / Aishwarya Jaydev Mehra: Mr. Sehgal and Rajeshwari's daughter; Naresh's younger sister; Jaydev's wife
- Sachin Khedekar as Jaydev Mehra: Sukhdev's elder brother; Aishwarya's husband; Mr. Sehgal and Rajeshwari's son–in–law
- Divya Seth as Rajeshwari Sehgal: Mr. Sehgal's wife; Naresh and Aishwarya's mother; Dolly and Jaydev's mother–in–law (Dead)
- Rajeev Paul as Naresh Sehgal: Mr. Sehgal and Rajeshwari's son; Aishwarya's elder brother; Dolly's husband; Kajri's boyfriend; Mr. Tyagi's son–in–law
- Raviraj
- Moonmoon Banerjee as Kajri: Naresh's girlfriend
- Vaquar Shaikh as Inspector Siddhant
- Sweta Keswani as Dolly Tyagi / Dolly Naresh Sehgal: Mr. Tyagi's daughter; Naresh's wife; Mr. Sehgal and Rajeshwari's daughter–in–law
- Shishir Sharma as D.I.G.
- Sanjay Batra as Siddharth Srivastav
- Susheel Parashar as Mahesh Sinha
- Aliya Khan as Tara Jaiswal
- Bhupendra Awasthi as Mr. Vishwanath Sharma: Kanak's father (Dead)
- Ravee Gupta as Shalini
- Deepshikha Nagpal as Anita: Mohan's girlfriend; Sanjay's friend
- Kiran Karmarkar as Sukhdev Mehra: Jaydev's younger brother
