= Padmarani =

Indian actress (1937–2016)

- Born: 25 January 1937; Pune, Maharashtra
- Died: 25 January 2016 (aged 79); Mumbai, Maharashtra
- Occupation: Actress
- Spouse: Namdar Irani
- Children: Daisy Irani Subaiah (daughter)
- Relatives: Roy–Joshi–Irani-Desai family

Padmarani, also spelled as Padma Rani, (25 January 1937 – 25 January 2016) was an Indian actress who performed in Gujarati plays, Gujarati films, and Hindi films.

== Early life ==
Padmarani was born to a Maharashtrian family in Pune, Maharashtra on 25 January 1937. She was brought up in Kanabi Vad, Unchi Pol on Rajmahal Road in Vadodara, Gujarat. Her father, Bhimrao Bhosle, was a barrister, and her mother, Kamlabai Rane, was from Goa. She was young when her family encountered a period of financial hardship, and she and her sister, later a veteran actress Sarita Joshi, began performing on stage to help. She completed her primary education from Govindrao Central School in Dandiya Bazar, Vadodara.

She along with her sister caught the eye of Faredoon Irani, father of Aruna Irani, while acting in a play of Ramanlal Murtivala in Vadodara. He took them to Mumbai. At the age of eighteen, Padmarani married Namdar Irani, uncle of Aruna Irani, who was a zamindar and member of the Parsi family and a theatre director.

== Career ==
Padmarani performed in over 6,000 Gujarati theatre shows. Padmarani was a lead actress in number of popular plays, including Baa Retire Thai Chhe, Baa E Maari Boundary, Kevda Na Dankh, Saptapadi, Chandarwo, 5 Star Aunty and Vachan. In the final decades of her life, Padmarani increasingly played maternal lead roles. Her last play was, Amari To Arjee Baki Tamari Marjee. She worked with Arvind Rathod, a well known Gujarati actor, in numerous plays, including Baa Retire Thai Chhe.

She acted in more than 200 Gujarati films. The 1961 film Narsaiyyani Hundi was her first Gujarati film. In 1963, she acted in Akhand Saubhagyavati alongside Asha Parekh. In 1966, Padmarani acted in Kalapi, based on the life of Gujarati royal and poet, Kalapi, where she played the princess wife of Kalapi, who was played by Sanjeev Kumar. She also acted in several successful Gujarati films including Janamtip (1969), Patli Parmar (1978) with Upendra Trivedi, Gangasati (1979), Lohini Sagaai (1980), Kasumbi No Rang, Shamal Shah No Vivah and Bhagat Peepaji (1980), which was based on the life of the poet Bhagat Pipa.

Padmarani also acted in some Hindi films including her major debut Kanyadaan (1968) where she played the talkative but perceptive Gulabi, Parivar (1968), Veer Ghatotkach (1970), Jai Santoshi Maa (1975), Dil (1990) and Zaalim (1994).

Her TV serial Naqaab starring Bengali actor Anil Chatterjee was appreciated by critics and viewers alike. She enacted a nurse to an ageing actor (Chatterji). There was another serial of Himesh Reshammiya and Padmarani acted in more than 1000 episodes of the TV show Swapna Kinare.

Padmarani died on her 79th birthday, 25 January 2016 in Mumbai following complications in lungs due to viral infection.

== Personal life ==
Padmarani and Namdar Irani had a daughter, Daisy Irani, who also took up acting. She settled in Singapore after marriage.
