= Roha Fort =

Fort in Kutch Gujarat

Coordinates: 23°12′2″N 69°16′11″E

Kanthkot Fort
- Part of Gujarat
- Kutch, Gujarat, India
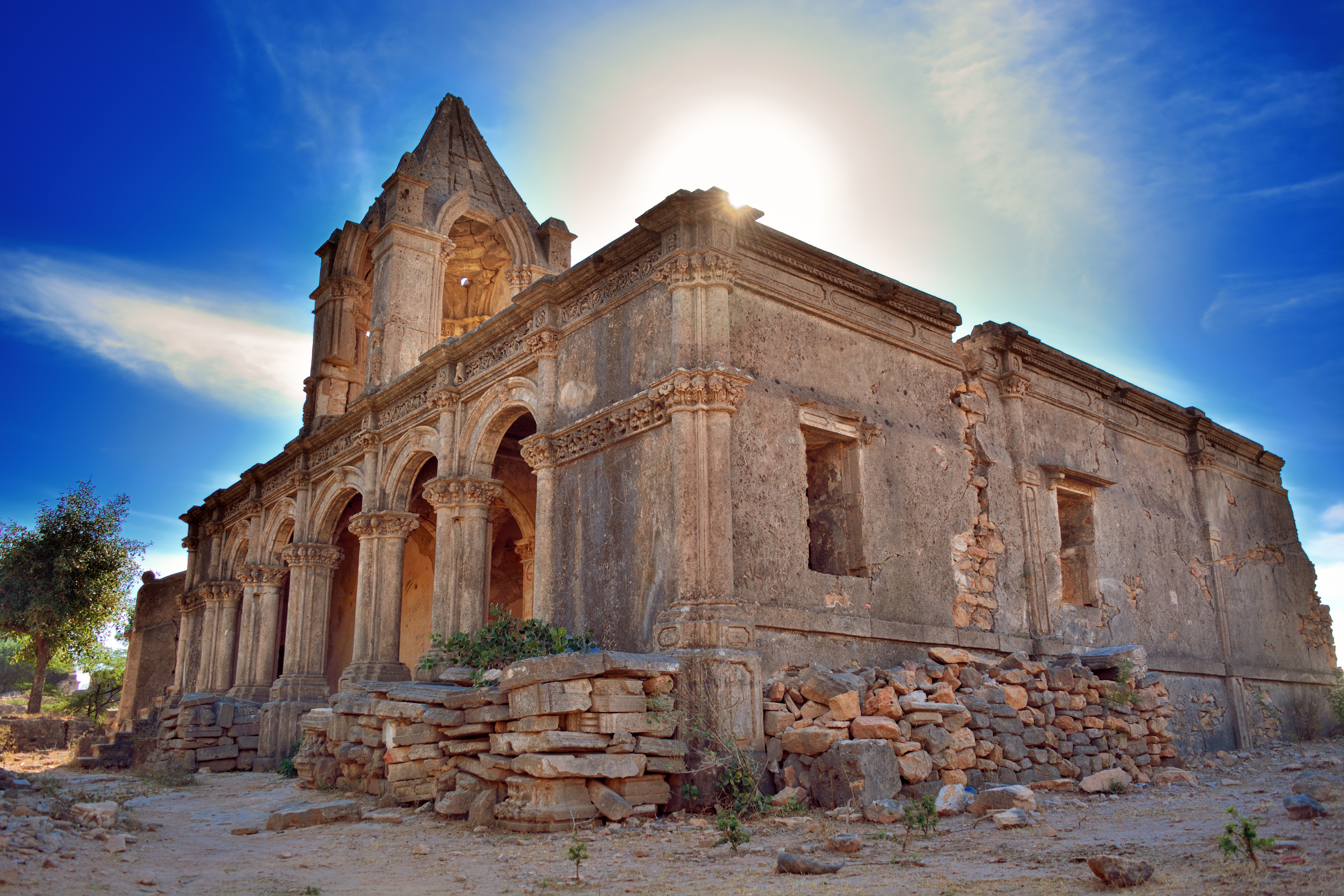
- Roha Fort

Site information
- Type: Fort
- Controlled by: Government of Gujarat
- Condition: Ruins

Site history
- Materials: Granite Stones and lime mortar

Roha Fort is one of the many forts of Kutch, Gujarat.

The fort is located on the periphery of Roha village, in Nakhatrana Taluka of Kutch. It was the seat of Roha Jagir. One hundred twenty Soomra Rajput princesses sought asylum with Abda (Jagirdar of Abdasa) who died in the battle with Allaudin Khilji. Consequently, all the princesses sacrificed their lives and took samadhi here, consequently, the place came to be known as Sumari Roha.

Roha Fort is situated about 50 kilometers from Bhuj. It covers almost an area of 16 acres and it is connected by main road. Its height is 500 feet from the ground level and 800 feet from the sea level.

Roha was the leading jagir of Kutch which is also known as ‘Roha Sumari Fort’. About 52 villages are under this fort. Sahebji, the brother of Rao Khengarji – I (1510–1585) set up the Roha village and died in the battle with Raysinhji Zala. Two big tanks were made by his successor Jiyaji and a fort was built by his son Thakore Noganji.

The famous poet of Gujarat, Kalapi, wrote romantic poems at Roha hill because the atmosphere of Roha was peaceful and close to nature with many peacocks and other birds which can be seen here even now.

Roha is now a major tourist attraction of Kutch.
