= Lakho Phulani (film) =

- Poster
- Directed by: Narendra Dave
- Written by: Shivkumar Acharya (story, dialogue); Digant Oza, Niranjan Mehta (script)
- Based on: Lakho Phulani
- Produced by: Digant Oza, Niranjan Mehta
- Starring: Rajeev; Rita Bhaduri; P. Kharsani
- Cinematography: Pratap Dave, Arvind Dave
- Edited by: S. R. Sawant
- Music by: Gaurang Vyas
- Production company: Sootradhar International
- Distributed by: Rupam Pictures
- Release date: 1976
- Running time: 124 minutes
- Country: India
- Language: Gujarati

Lakho Phulani (Gujarati: લાખો ફુલાણી) is a 1976 Gujarati historical fantasy film directed by Narendra Dave from India based on the folktale of Lakho Phulani. It was produced under the banner of the Sootradhar International by Digant Oza, presented by Niranjan Mehta and co-produced by Rupa Niranjan Mehta. It starred Rajiv, Rita Bhaduri and P. Kharsani in lead roles.

== Plot ==
The film is loosely based on folktales of Lakho Phulani.

Lakho Phulani, a prince, rebelled against his tyrannical father. A Solanki princess left her royal life to be with her beloved Phulani. The prince became a benevolent ruler and popular figure in Saurashtra and Kutch.

== Cast ==
The cast is as follows:

- Rajeev
- Rita Bhaduri
- P. Kharsani
- Bharat Bhushan
- Nalin Dave
- Lalita
- Janak T
- Rajesh Mehta
- Madhavi Pandya
- Balkrishna Dave
- Kishor Dave
- Nayan Bhatt
- Hansa Lakod
- Jayendra Mishra
- Champshibhai Nagda (guest appearance)
- Anup Dave (guest appearance)

== Production ==
Journalist Digant Oza decided to make a film on the subject of Lakho Phulani when Ravindra Dave declined the subject after they watched a play Lakho Phulani produced by Deshi Natak Samaj in Mumbai. The film was Oza's first production. It was produced under the banner of the Sootradhar International, presented by Niranjan Mehta and co-produced by Rupa Niranjan Mehta. Chhel-Paresh served as an art director while journalist Shivkumar Acharya served as a story and dialogue writer. Rita Bhaduri was introduced by her classmate Paresh Mehta to the producers who decided to cast her opposite Rajeev. Initially Arun Bhatt was decided as a director but was replaced by Narendra Dave, cousin of Ravindra Dave.

== Soundtrack ==
The songs were written by Avinash Vyas, and the music was composed by his son Gaurang Vyas. The film marked Gaurang Vyas's debut as an independent music director as well as Kishore Kumar and Praful Dave's debut as playback singers in Gujarati cinema. The song "Maniyaro Te Halu Halu Thai Re Viyo…" became very popular.

Lakho Phulani

Soundtrack album by Gaurang Vyas
- Released: 1976
- Genre: Feature film soundtrack
- Label: HMV
- Producer: Sootradhar International

All music is composed by Gaurang Vyas.

Track list
No.	Title	Lyrics	Singer(s)	Length
1.	"Ek Patan Shern Naar Padamani"	Avinash Vyas	Asha Bhosle, Mahendra Kapoor	2:57
2.	"Maniyaro Te Halu Halu Thai Re Viyo…"	Dan Alagari, Avinash Vyas	Praful Dave, Suman Kalyanpur and Chorus	6:54
3.	"Gao Sau Sathe Tamne Bajrang Bali Ni Aan Chhe"	Avinash Vyas	Kishore Kumar and Chorus	6:25
4.	"Maa Sonanun Paranun"		Asha Bhosle	5:52
5.	"Mare Kaljade Thadkaro Thay"		Bhupinder Singh, Preeti Sagar	3:34
Total length:				25:44

== Reception ==
The film was a commercial success. Bhaduri continued to work in Gujarati cinema and became a leading actress.
