= Jungle Love (film) =

- Directed by: V. Menon
- Produced by: Rajkumar Ludhani
- Music by: Anand-Milind
- Production company: Ram Lakhan Production
- Release date: 12 July 1990
- Country: India
- Language: Hindi

Jungle Love is a Hindi action adventure film of Bollywood based on the Tarzan story. This was directed by V. Menon and produced by Rajkumar Ludhani The film was released on 12 July 1990 under the banner of Ram Lakhan Production.

== Plot ==
A chimpanzee of the Amazonian jungle saves a baby and raises him as her own. He becomes the Tarzan of the jungle. A gang of treasure hunters come to the jungle with two young ladies accompanying them. One of them, Rita, is captured by a cannibalistic tribe. Tarzan saves her and befriends Rita. Rita gives him the name Raja and falls in love with him.

== Cast ==
- Satish Shah as Champa
- Goga Kapoor as Gajja
- Gajendra Chouhan as Billa
- Kirti Singh as Rita
- Rita Bhaduri as Maharani Vidyavathi
- Aruna Irani as Jamna
- Disco Shanti as Prema
- Rocky as Raja
- Mahesh Anand as Dr. Pinto
- Shiva as Karma

== Soundtrack ==
The music of the film is composed by Anand-Milind, and the lead singers are Manhar Udhas, Anuradha Paudwal, Falguni Singh and Sadhana Sargam.

1. " He Man O My He Man" - Falguni Singh
2. "Hum To The Anjaane" - Anuradha Paudwal
3. "Koyaliya Gati Hai Payaliya Chhankati Hai" - Anuradha Paudwal
4. "Laila Ne Kaha Jo Majnu Se" - Anuradha Paudwal, Manhar Udhas
5. "Mera Mehboob Aayega" - Sadhana Sargam
