= Kalapi =

Gujarati poet and ruler of Lathi, India (1874–1900)

Sursinhji Gohil 'Kalapi'
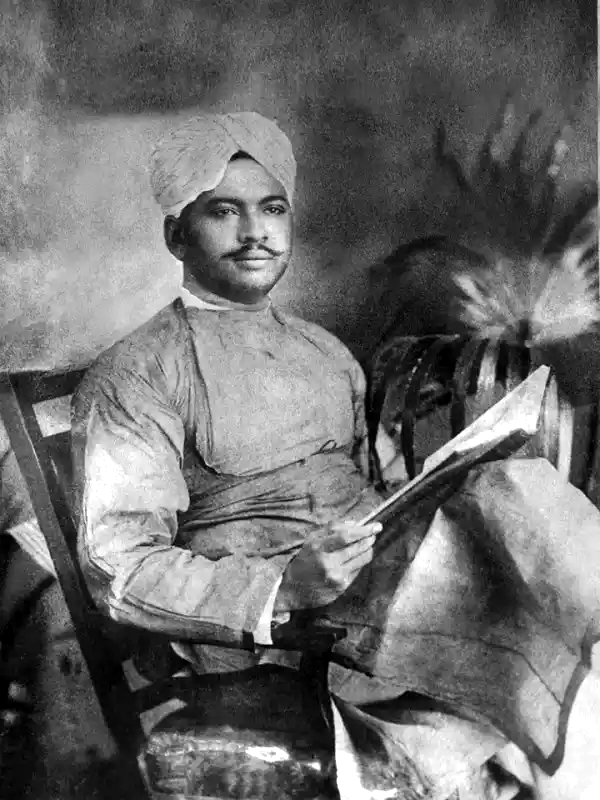
- Kalapi
- Born: Sursinhji Takhtasinhji Gohil; 26 January 1874; Lathi, Amreli, British India
- Died: 10 June 1900 (aged 26); Lathi, Bombay presidency, British India
- Education: Std. 5 (English medium)
- Alma mater: Rajkumar College, Rajkot
- Occupations: poet, writer
- Spouses: Rajba a.k.a. Ramaba (1889–1900); Kesharba a.k.a. Anandiba (1889–1900); Monghi a.k.a. Shobhana (1898–1900)
- Writing career
- Pen name: Kalapi
- Language: Gujarati
- Years active: 1892–1900
- Period: Pandit Yuga
- Subjects: Love, nature and spirituality
- Notable works: Kalapino Kekarav (1903); Kashmirno Pravas (1912)

Sursinhji Takhtasinhji Gohil (26 January 1874 – 10 June 1900), popularly known by his pen name, Kalapi was a Gujarati poet and the Thakor (prince) of Lathi state in Gujarat. He is mostly known for his poems depicting his own pathos.

He lived in Lathi-Gohilwad, which is located in the Saurashtra region of Gujarat.

== Life ==
Kalapi was born on 26 January 1874 to his father Maharaja Takhtasinhji, the ruler of Lathi, a small state situated in a far away corner of Saurashtra region, and mother Ramaba. Takhtasinhji died when Kalapi was 5, and Ramaba died when Kalapi was 14. These deaths left a permanent impact on Kalapi's mind.

At the age of 8, Kalapi entered into Rajkumar College, Rajkot for school education, and spent next 9 years (1882 – 1891) there, but didn't complete his schooling and dropped out of school. During these times, he studied extensively English, Sanskrit and contemporary Gujarati literature.

Kalapi's date of death is uncertain. It is formally noted down as 10 June 1900. There is also some controversy over his death. It was declared as death due to Cholera but some believed that it was not a natural death.

=== Personal life ===
Kalapi was married—at the age of 15—to two princesses. These were Rajba-Ramaba (born 1868), the princess of Kutch–Roha; and Kesharba-Anandiba (born 1872), the princess of Saurashtra–Kotada. When Kalapi was 20 years old, he fell in love with a family maid, Shobhana, who served his royal family.

It is believed that Kalapi's love for Shobhana became a source of conflict with Rajba-Ramaba and the reason for his subsequent death due to poisoning by her.

== Works ==
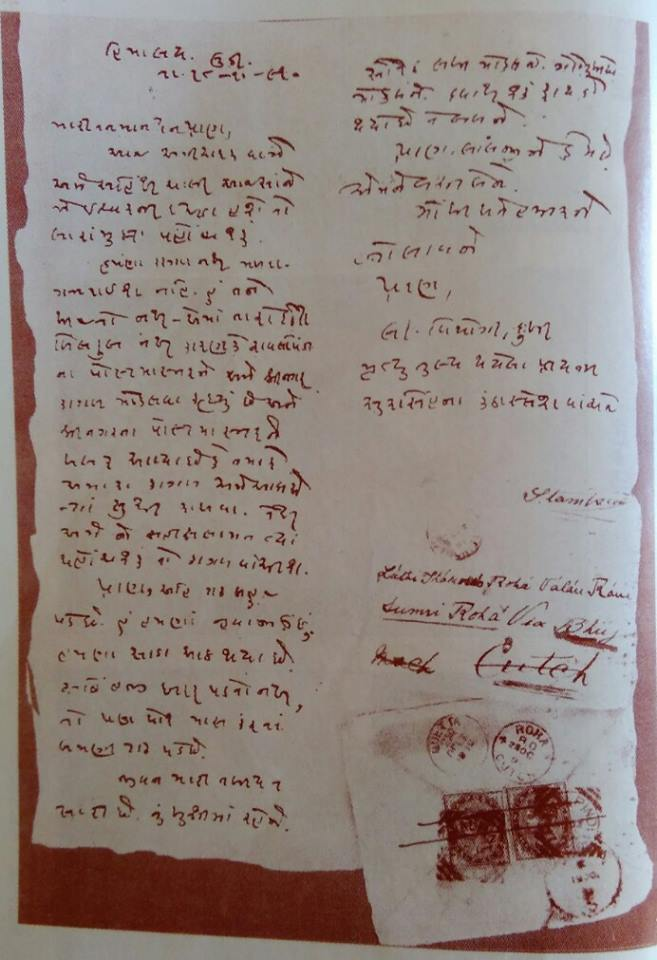
Handwriting of Kalapi (A letter written to Monghi (a.k.a. Shobhana)

In spite of his short life, Kalapi's body of work was large. The poet penned about 250 poems, including about 15,000 verses. He also authored a number of prose writings and over 900 letters to his friends and wives. He not only used the Gujarati language as his medium to elaborate on his thoughts, but also translated four English novels to Gujarati.

Kalapi mentored a number of budding poets who carried on his style of writing, many of whom become famous in their own right. The most prominent among these was Kavi Lalitji, who was about the same age as Kalapi, and was already an established poet when he was invited to the Lathi Darbar as a tutor for the royal children. He came under Kalapi's influence and the two became great friends. Lalitji went on to become the Rajya Kavi (Royal Bard) of Lathi.

Kavi Kalapi had written poems in various Chhand (metres) of the Gujarati language. Like Mandakranta, Shardulvikridit, Shikharini and others, to write poems in Chhand, one has to follow the structure of that chhand and the rules of chhandas poetry. Aapni Yadi is one of his best known ghazals in the Gujarati literature.

== Legacy ==
In his remembrance, the Indian National Theater at Mumbai, since 1997, gives the Kalapi Award to an accomplished Gujarati ghazal poet annually.

=== Museum ===
The Kalpi Tirtha Museum holds objects related to the life of the Gujarati poet Kalpi. The museum was inaugurated in 2005. It is located at Lathi on the birthplace of Kalpi in the Amreli district of Gujarat. There is a huge collection of articles written by the artists themselves, letters, the rare items they used, and the history of the monarchy. The memorials were also associated with the Kalpi Tirtha, where the Kalpati lived, the palace, which was sitting on the banks of the lake. This place is a center of attraction for Gujarat's literature makers. There is a small auditorium on the upper floors of Kalpitirth Bhawan. Apart from Wednesdays, this museum gives free entry. Videography and photography are permitted.

== In popular culture ==
The 1966 Gujarati film, Kalapi, is based on his life. Sanjeev Kumar plays the titular role, and Padmarani plays the role of his wife, Rama. The film was directed by Manhar Raskapur.

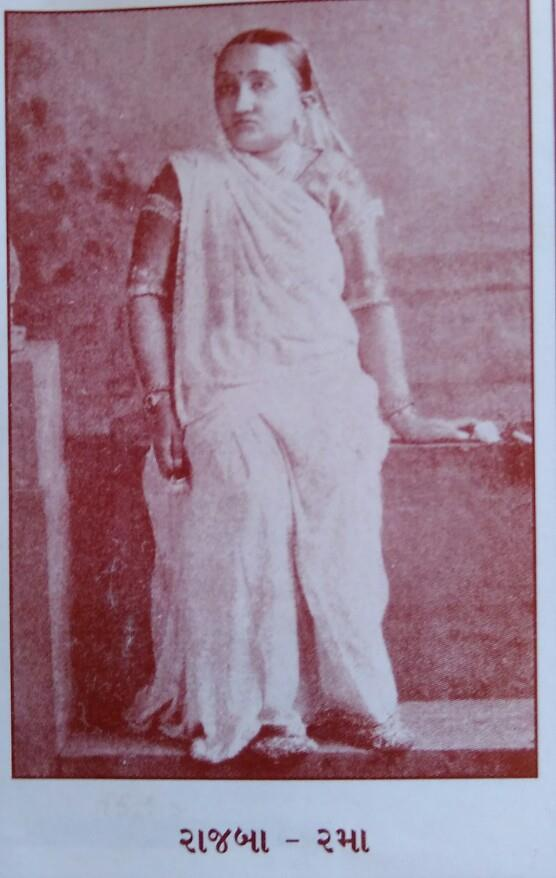
First wife, Rajba a.k.a. Ramaba

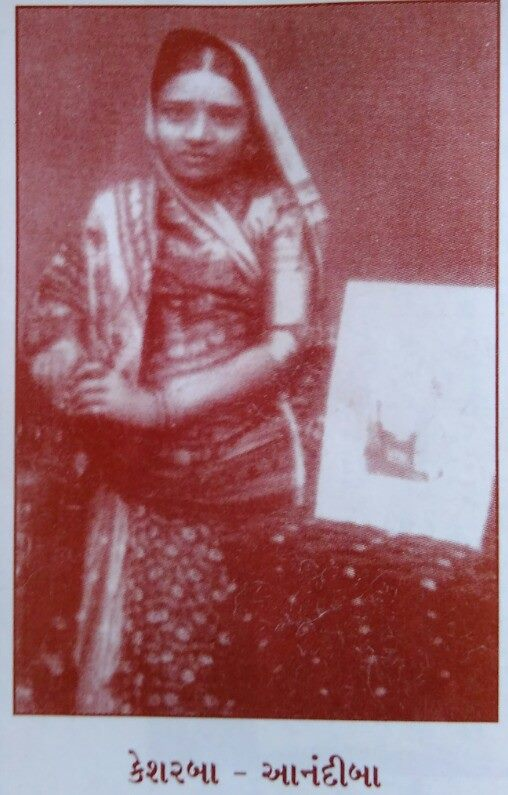
Second wife, Kesharba a.k.a. Anandiba

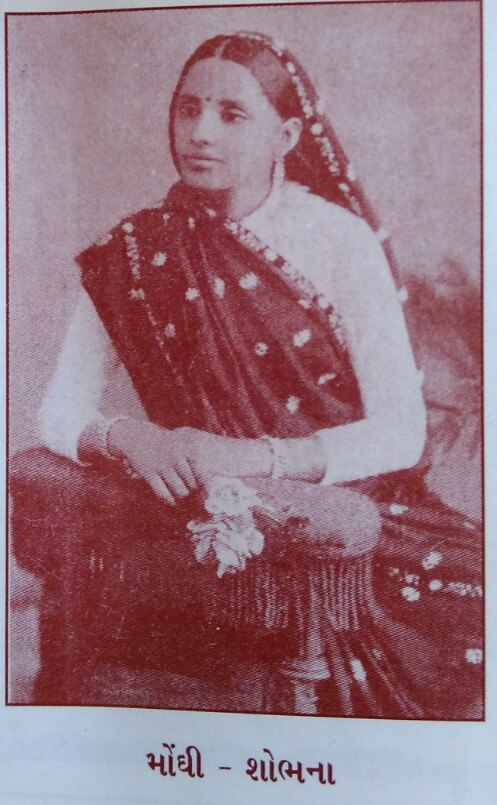
Third wife, Monghi a.k.a. Shobhana

== See also ==
- List of Gujarati-language writers
- List of unsolved deaths
