= Bindiya Sarkar =

Indian Hindi language Political Romance television series

- Genre: Political; Romance; Drama
- Developed by: Meesha Gautam
- Written by: Malvika Asthana, S Manasvi
- Directed by: Vikas Anand Golait
- Starring: Sonal Khilwani; Dhruv Bhandari
- Opening theme: "Bindya Sarkar"
- Country of origin: India
- Original language: Hindi
- No. of seasons: 1
- No. of episodes: 312

Production
- Producer: Jay Mehta
- Running time: 30 min
- Production company: Jay Mehta Productions

Original release
- Network: Dangal
- Release: 25 July 2022 – 25 June 2023

Bindiya Sarkar (transl. Bindhya Government) is an Indian political romantic dramatic television series produced by Jay Mehta under the banner of Jay Mehta Productions. This show was premiered on 25 July 2022 on Dangal. And it stars Sonal Khilwani and Dhruv Bhandari in their lead roles. It ended on 25 June 2023 and it was replaced by Kaisa Hai Yeh Rishta Anjaana.

== Plot ==
Bindiya, is an illiterate orphaned women lives with her uncle and her aunt in a village at Uttar Pradesh and she aspires to marry a man from Lucknow. While, Abhay who is a famous IPS Officer lives with his family at Lucknow but he hates his father because of his dark past and he want to marry a woman who is highly educated.

Abhay and Bindiya meets each other when Abhay saves her from goons. Abhay learns that Bindiya is an illiterate women as he does not want to marry her and he decided to marry his girlfriend, Megha who is educated women. On the wedding day, Barfi locks Megha when she was trying to call Abhay to elope and the Bharadwaj family forces Abhay to marry Bindiya and Abhay finally marries her but he blames her for marrying him and started to hate her.

At one day, Bindiya saves the Chief Minister from goons who tries to kill him and he gets hospitalized and it is revealed Kantilal is behind all this as he wants to kill the Chief Minister because he himself want to become the Chief Minister. As Abhay, finds out this and he makes Bindiya donate her blood to the Chief Minister and finally the Chief Minister announces Abhay to make Bindiya as the Chief Minister and finally Bindiya becomes the Chief Minister.

Bindiya and Abhay finally fall in love with each other and they later learns about the evil deeds done by Barfi, her sister Tapo and Megha as they makes both Tapo and Megha to be arrested while Barfi decides to separate them and she starts to hate her and she creates many problems for them and repeatedly tries to kill Bindiya but always fails while Kantilal and his eldest son Harishankar and Harishankar's wife Runjun wants to take revenge against on them.

Harishankar, had an illegal liquor selling operation. The operation was stopped due to Bindiya and he takes revenge by bringing her doppelganger but it was learned by Anju and she tries to reveal it to Bindiya but is prevented by Harishankar while, Bindiya learns about this and stops them from hurting Anju.

Barfi pretends to being changed and she brings Bindiya to the cliff and tries to kill her but both Barfi and Bindiya falls down the cliff and as soon as Bindiya saves Barfi, Kantilal cuts the rope which leads Bindiya fall into the river and which shocks Barfi as Kantilal seeks vengeance against her. While Harishankar makes Abhay into an accident which leads Abhay to think that Bindiya is dead.

=== Seven years later ===
Abhay who is still devastated as he thinks that Bindiya is dead and he lives with the Bharadwaj family while Bindiya who is now revealed to be alive, lives as Bindiya Bhalla in Mumbai with a Punjabi Hindu man named Rohan Bhalla and raises his daughter Priya Bhalla. It is revealed that after the accident, Bindiya had lost her memory and it was Rohan who saved her.

The Bharadwaj family fixes Abhay's marriage to Minty, who is Rohan's sister and Abhay comes to Mumbai. Abhay and Bindiya finally meets each other but he gets surprised to know about Bindiya's memory loss. Minty learns that Abhay is Bindiya's husband and tries to separate them. Rohan also wants to separate Abhay from Bindiya but repeatedly fails. While, Barfi who still has hatred towards Bindiya, tries to kill her. Bindiya, finally regains her memory and she saves Abhay from the goons who had tried to attack him.

Rohan and Minty are revealed to be their enemies and he had accused Abhay and gets him arrested and Rohan sends his men to kill Abhay. Bindiya and Abhay learn that Rohan and Minty's elder brother Ravi Bhalla, was killed by Abhay in an encounter because he was involved in a fake drug case which led to the entire Bhalla family killing themselves and this incident had led both Rohan and Minty to want to take revenge against Abhay. Rohan's men beat Abhay unconscious while Bindiya learns that Rohan and Minty plan to kill the Bharadwaj family and she exposes Rohan and Minty and their truth is in front of the Bharadwaj family and they get arrested by police and Abhay gains consciousness. Bindiya learns that Kantilal is behind her accident and also Barfi tried to kill her and blames them for the reason and Bindiya and Abhay finally takes Priya's responsibility.

Bindiya and Abhay finally falls in love together but it does not last long due to the return of a man named Raghav. Raghav creates many problems inside the Bharadwaj family and tries to separate them and it is revealed that 400 years ago, Suryapratap Singh (who is Raghav's previous life) had fallen in love with a woman named Arundhati (who is revealed to be Bindiya's previous life). Arundhati had died and Suryapratap had promised her that he will return in another life and he also dies. As Arundhati is reborn as Bindiya while Suryapratap's soul had come to her life again. Bindiya learns about Raghav's truth but Raghav traps the Bharadwaj family by using his powers and threats Bindiya to marry her. But Bindiya saves the Bharadwaj family by stabbing Raghav's soul and his soul gets destroyed.

Bindiya learns that she is pregnant with Abhay's child as Abhay gets happy to learns about her pregnancy. Kantilal and Barfi hatches a plan to make Bindiya and Abhay separate and they succeeded to separate them by bringing Media reporters and making them to believe that Bindiya is having an affair with another man and is pregnant with his child which shocks Bindiya while Abhay and Bindiya blame each other for this and she runs away which shocks him and he tries to find her but Bindiya escapes from an accident which leads Abhay to think that Bindiya is dead.

=== Six years later ===
Bindiya, is now living her own family and she raises her and Abhay's daughter, Aadiya. While Abhay, who has now resigned as IPS Officer and has now become a Chief Minister as he is married to Anju as her husband, Jublee and Kantilal is dead and they live with their son, Bittu.

Bindiya and Abhay miss each other and one Day, Abhay meets Aadiya unaware that Aadiya is his daughter and feels a connection with her. Bindiya meets Abhay but she gets shocks to learns about Abhay and Anju's marriage and she fells betrayed.

Bindiya and Abhay finally meet each other as Abhay learns that Aadiya is his daughter. But Bindiya wants Abhay not to reveal this truth that he is the father of Aadiya. Anju, who is falling in love with Abhay decided to separate Abhay and Bindiya with the help of Barfi and Runjun but always fails. Aadiya gets kidnapped by some kidnappers while Abhay and Bindiya saves her and he confesses the truth to Aadiya that he is her father and they reunite.

Anju decides to take revenge against Bindiya and Aadiya while Bindiya gets pregnant again with Abhay's child but Anju and Barfi replaced her pregnancy report. Bindiya comes to learns about this and exposes Anju's truth in front of the Bharadwaj family but Anju makes Aadiya kidnapped and ties her with a Gas cylinder and tries to commit suicide but Barfi stops her and she reveals her true colours in front of them and then she tries to burst it with Barfi but Bindiya and Abhay saves Barfi. Abhay and Bindiya tries to save Anju but she dies due to explosion which shocks them and Barfi realizes her mistake and apologizes Bindiya for her past actions and gets reunite. Two years later, Bindiya gives birth to her second child while Bittu and Aadiya now become friends and the show ends with Abhay resigns himself as a Chief Minister and he makes Bindiya a Chief Minister of this state again.

== Cast ==
=== Main ===
- Sonal Khilwani as
  - Bindiya Abhay Bharadwaj; Abhay's wife; Chief Minister of Uttar Pradesh; Aadiya's mother (2022–2023)
  - Arundathi; Surya Prathap Singh's love interest (Previous birth)
- Dhruv Bhandari as Abhay Bharadwaj; Kantilal and Barfi Devi's son; Hari Shankar and Jublee's youngest brother; Bindiya's husband; Anju's second ex-husband; Former IPS Officer; Former Chief Minister of Uttar Pradesh; Aadiya and Bittu's father (2022–2023)

=== Recurring ===
- Amit Behl as Kantilal Bharadwaj; Barfi Devi's former husband; Abhay, Hari Shankar and Jublee's father; Bindiya and Anju's father-in-law; Aadiya and Bittu's grandfather (2022–2023)(Dead)
- Neelu Vaghela as Barfi Devi Bharadwaj; Kantilal's wife, Abhay, Hari Shankar and Jublee's mother; Bindiya and Anju's mother-in-law; Tapo Ma's elder sister, Aadiya and Bittu's grandmother (2022–2023)
- Brijesh Maurya as Briju
- Abhilash Chaudhary as Jublee Kantilal Bharadwaj; Kantilal and Barfi Devi's younger son; Hari Shankar's younger brother; Abhay's elder brother; Anju's former husband (2022–2023) (Dead)
- Sudhir Drayan as Bindiya's uncle
- Harshitta Shukla as Bindiya's aunt
- Urvi Gor/Siddhi Sharma as Anju Abhay Bharadwaj; Jublee's widow; Abhay's second ex-wife; Bindiya's sister-in-law; Bittu's mother, Aadiya's aunt (2022–2023)(Dead)
- Roshni Sahota as Megha Mathur: Abhay's ex–girlfriend; Bindiya's former personal assistant and rival (2022)
- Rashmi Gupta as Runjun Shankar Bharadwaj; Hari Shankar's wife; Bindiya's rival (2022–2023)
- Ginnie Virdi
- Aaditya Vajpayee
- Sikandar Kharbanda as Hari Shankar Bharadwaj; Kantilal and Barfi Devi's eldest son, Jublee and Abhay's elder brother; Runjun's husband; Bindiya's rival (2022–2023)
- Gunjan Bhatia
- Prithvi Zutshi as CM
- Anupama Solanki as Tapo Ma; Barfi Devi's younger sister (2022)
- Ribbhu Mehra as Rohan Bhalla; Ravi's younger brother; Minti's elder brother; Priya's father; Abhay and Bindiya's rival (2023)
- Swarna Bharat as Ravi, Rohan, Minti's mother; Priya's grandmother(2023)
- Trisha Sarda as Priya Bhalla; Rohan's daughter (2023)
- Pratiksha Singh as Minti Bhalla; Ravi's younger sister; Rohan's eldest younger sister; Priya's aunt, Abhay's ex-fiancé; Bindiya's rival (2023)
- Krishnakant Singh Bundela as Panditji (2022)
- Rohit Choudhary as Raghav/Surya Prathap Singh (previous birth) (2023)
- Diyaa Mahan as Aadiya Abhay Bharadwaj; Bindiya and Abhay's daughter; Bittu's Cousin (2023)
- Avyan Gautham as Bittu Jublee Bharadwaj; Abhay and Anju's son; Aadiya's half-brother (2023)
- Meena Mir as Bindiya's Mother (2023)
- Alok Nath Pathak as Politician Laxmi Narayan (2022)
- Shiv Singh Shrinet as MLA Party Worker (2022)
- Govind Prem Ojha as News Anchor (2022)
- Kuldeep Chaudhary as Sniper (2023)

=== Cameo appearances ===
- Trupti Mishra as Suman from Palkon Ki Chhaon Mein 2 (2023)
- Shagun Singh as Mauli from Mast Mauli (2023)

== See also ==
- List of programmes broadcast by Dangal TV
