= Dhruv Bhandari =

Indian television actor

- Occupations: Actor; Businessman
- Years active: 2010–2011; 2013; 2015; 2022–2023
- Known for: Rakt Sambandh; Tere Sheher Mein; Bindiya Sarkar
- Spouse: Shruti Merchant (m. 2017)
- Father: Mohan Bhandari

Dhruv Bhandari is an Indian actor who has appeared in films and TV series such as Rakt Sambandh and Star Plus's Tere Sheher Mein.

His father is Mohan Bhandari.

== Filmography ==
=== Film ===
- Click (2010 film)
- Dil Toh Baccha Hai Ji (2011, cameo)
- Pathayeram Kodi (2013, as Ashwin)

=== Television ===
Year	Serial	Role	Channel	Notes	References
2010–2011	Rakt Sambandh	Yuvraj Jagirdar	Imagine TV	Negative Role	
2015	Tere Sheher Mein	Abhimanyu "Mantu" Srivastav	Star Plus	Lead Role	
2022–2023	Bindiya Sarkar	Abhay Bharadwaj	Dangal	Lead Role	
