= Lakho Phulani =

10th-century Sindhi ruler

Lakho Phoolani لاکو ڦلاڻي
- Born: 920 AD; India
- Died: 1010 AD

Jaam Lakho Phulani, (Sindhi: لاکو ڦلاڻي, born in c. 920 A.D, 1010 A.D) also known as Lakho Fulani or Lakho Phoolani, was a notable historical character and ruler, who ruled parts of Sindh, Kutch and Saurashtra. Who in Sindh, struggled to establish a permanent and stable government of the Sindhis. He was ruler of Sind in the 10th century. According to Dr. Nabi Bakhsh Baloch, Lakho Phulani of Sindh made big raids on the Gujarat. For those who began the process of mutilation, it was historically valid. Atkot is a historical town, said to have been settled by Lakho Phulani. He also built Lakheshwar temple in Kera, Kutch.

The strongest folk tale of Lakho Phulani is counted among (Sindhi: ست سورهيه ڏهه ڏاتار, Hindi: सात जोधो दस दत्ता) "Seven Warriors" and "Ten Lords" of Sindh by Sindhi Intellects (Sughars). He shifted his capital to Kera and built a fort there.

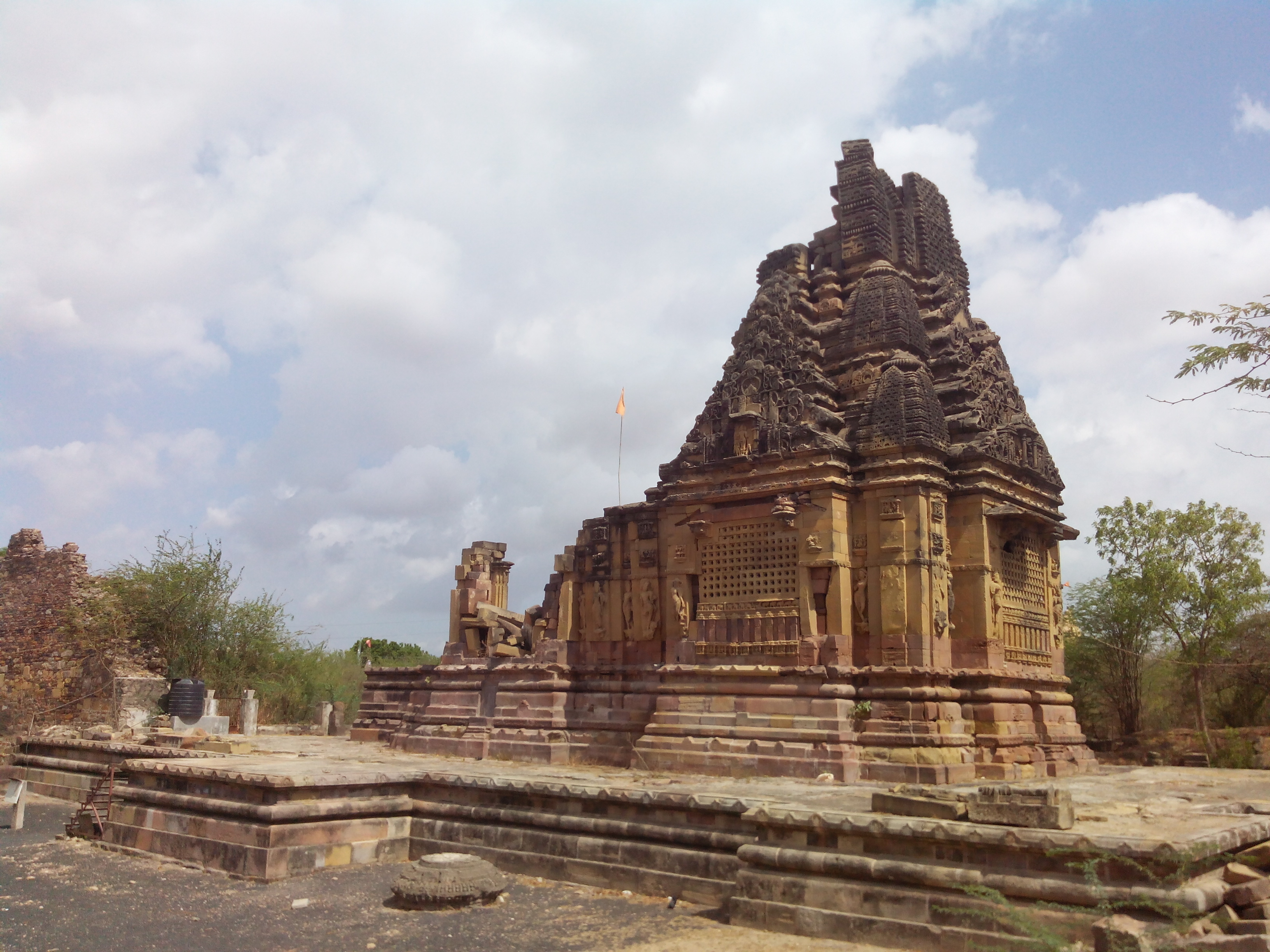
Ruined Shiva Temple built by Lakho Phulani at Kera

He built Lakheswar temple. He founded Atkot.

Shah Abdul Latif in his poetry has mentioned bravery of Lakho Phulani.

== Birth and family ==
Lakho Phulani was the son of Raja Phul of Kutch, Kerakot; He was grandson of Jam Lakho Dhuraro. Laakkho Phulaanni born in 920 A.D, his mother's name was Sonal . Lakho Phulani was son of Phul who was king of Angorgadh. Lakho Fulani was grandson of the King of Sindh (Sindhpati) Jam Lakho Dhuraro.

He married Mahar Kumari, who belonged to the Maher tribe.

== History ==
Jam Lakho Fulani was adopted as a son by Jam Jada, who was the direct descendant of Jam Unad (Not to be confused with Jam Unar) in Nagar Thattha Sindh. Jam Jada had no any legitimate heir to his throne, but after some time Jam Jada's wife gave birth to a child named Ghao. Soon after the death of Jam Jada, Ghao refused to share the ruling powers with Jam Lakho an adopted son of Jam Jada, and was forced to leave Sindh along with his twin brother Lakhair and companions. Lakho and his brother Lakhair went to Kuch and regained control of Chavdas territories, which were named after Lakhiar as Lakhiarviro by his brother Lakho. The descendants of Lakho Jadani are known as Jadejas "belonging to Jada".

== Death ==
He died at Atkot, Lakho fell fighting against Solanki king Mulraj of Anhilwad Patan within the lands of Atkot; after his death Rato Raydhan succeeded to the throne. On the other hand, sources from Marwar tradition says that the Lako Phoolani was killed by the Rathore Raja Sayaji of Marwar. Colonel James Todd also preferred the latter tradition. He was killed by his maternal uncle Rai Khann'ghaar in 1010, at that time, his age was 99 years.

However some researchers says that tomb of Lakho and Lakhi is somewhere in Kutch, but Lakho Fulani's dead body was brought from Kutch, Bhuj to Deh, Kot Dhingano, Kacho, District Shaheed Benzirabad Sindh by his fellows.

== In popular culture ==
- 1928 silent film Lakho Phulani by director Dinsha P. Jhaveri.
- A novel Lakho Phulani was written for children in 1986 by Dr Shamsuddin Ursani.
- Lakho Phulani is well-known folklore in both Sindh and Kutch.
- 1976 Gujarati film Lakho Phulani directed by Narendra Dave

== See also ==
- Lakho phulani (film)
