= Atkot =

Neighborhood in Gujarat, India

- Neighborhood
- Location in Gujarat, India
- Coordinates: 22°00′32″N 71°08′29″E
- Country: India
- State: Gujarat
- City: Jasdan

Aṭkoṭ is a neighborhood in Jasdan City, Gujarat, India. It was founded by the khachar ruler.

== History ==
Atkot is famous in local legends as having been founded by the celebrated Lakho Phulani, who fell fighting against Solanki king Mulraj of Anhilwad Patan within the lands of Atkot. Lakho's paliyo or funeral monument stands here to this day. Lakho was the son of Raja Phul of Kerakot in Vagad states and is said to have been born when his father was absent warring against Mulraj. On the day that Lakho was born Atkot his father is said to have made a foray as far as Patan and to have plundered a few shops, whence the couplet: (Note: The Gujarati runs: Je Di Lakho Janamiya Dharpat Kandhara; Te Di Pirana Patanja Kota Lota Kara.)

The day Lakho was born, both heaven and earth trembled;

That day the fort of Piran Patan he successfully plundered.

When Lakho grew up he was so daring and headstrong that his father found it difficult to keep him under control, and when he remonstrated with him regarding his conduct, Lakho crossed over the Rann of Kutch into Kathiawar, and stayed for some time in the neighbourhood of Than where he founded the village of Lakhamanchi. Here he stayed for a year or two, and during this time he made the acquaintance of Ra Graharipu of Junagadh who conceived a great friendship for him and invited him to populate Atkot. This Lakho did, and took up his residence there. Atkot had at first eight separate suburbs, and hence was named Atkot. Lakho Phulani is said to have introduced the grain called bajri, Pearl millet, to Kathiawar from a distant eastern country where he had gone on a foray. In that country the grain is said to have been called khardhan. There is a bardic couplet about this: (Note: The Gujardti runs : Balihari tari bajra, jena lamba pan; Ghode pankho aaviyo, buddha thaya javan.)

Bravo for your bajri which hath long leaves;

From it horses acquired wings, and old men became young.

Lakho is said to have had an amour with a celebrated singer called Dayi Dumri, about whom many legends are told. She is said to have lived in a house on the opposite side of the river. The spot is known to this day as Dayi Dumri's dhar or ridge. Lakho's raids however into Gujarat excited the wrath of Mulraj Solanki, who had also a quarrel with Ra Graharipu, the Chudasama Rao of Junagadh. But they were such fast friends and so renowned for prowess, that Mulraj hesitated to attack them. At last, however, Lakho alienated his sister's son Rakhayat, who went over to Mulraj and offered to conduct his forces to Atkot. Mulraj accepted the offer, and a great battle was fought in which Lakho was slain. The honour of slaying Lakho is attributed by some to Mulraj himself and by some to Rakhayat. But the popular belief is that Pabji Rathod received the reward but that Lakho actually fell by the hand of Dhabal Solanki. And thus the bardic couplet: (Note: The Gujarati runs : Dhabale Lakho mariyo, Pabal pasayo; Madhunlaye paarakho, gaando Gujjar raayo.)

Dhabal slew Lakho, Pabal received the reward;

They could not appreciate the man, the foolish kings of Gujarat.

Atkot then fell waste, but afterwards was repopulated by Ahirs. Then it fell under the Khumans of Kherdi State and afterwards formed a crown village of the Muslim domain of Sorath. On the extinction of the Muslim power it was conquered by the Lakhani Khachars and was wrested from them by the Jam of Navanagar State in the later part of the eighteenth century. The village was half surrounded by a fort, but it has been left unfinished. It was acquired by the Jam from the Kathi family of Jasdan State.

== Temples ==
Other temples in the village include (1) Maa Ambaji Temple. (2) Loyan Mata temple. (3) Swaminarayan Temple. (4) Sati temple. (5) Narmdeswar Mahadev Temple. (6) Fuliya Hanumanjidada Temple. (7) Suryamukhi Hanumanjidada Temple. (8) Virbai maa Temple

== Other note ==
It's believed that Mata Loyan who is worshiped by locals has cursed the town so that no Darbar or kathi samaj can peacefully live in the atkot and for that reason, they live out of town.
