= Chunauti =

Indian television series

- Genre: Drama
- Written by: Ashok Patole
- Directed by: Sanjiv Bhattacharya
- Starring: see below
- Opening theme: "Chunauti" by Amit Kumar
- Country of origin: India
- Original language: Hindi
- No. of seasons: 1
- No. of episodes: 22

Production
- Producer: Rakesh Chowdhary
- Camera setup: Multi-camera
- Running time: 25 minutes
- Production company: Samvaad Video Private Limited

Original release
- Network: DD National
- Release: 1987 – 1988

Chunauti is an Indian television series that aired on DD National from 1987 to 1988.

== Plot ==
Chunauti was a window into the psyche of college life in India. The serial profiled an idealist college principal Mr. Shastri and his travails with the problems that plague students including admissions, donations, ragging, miserable hostel conditions, drug addiction, irresponsible teachers, mass copying, and other malpractices. Character graphs and a well-crafted emotional drama covering every aspect of college life in detail made Chunauti a big hit.

Chunauti highlighted the higher education system and generated tremendous response from thinkers, planners and common masses. In the serial, principal Shastri faces adversity. In the end, however, with the assistance of many of his students and colleagues he emerges victorious.

== Cast ==
- Rajeev Verma
- Ajit Vachhani
- Mohan Bhandari
- Bharat Kapoor as Kothari
- Arif Zakaria as Ramakant Sharma
- Sunil Puri
- Channa Ruparel as Kamini
- Suchitra Krishnamoorthi as Vandana
- Raju Shrestha
- Rita Bhaduri
- Vaishali Dandekar
- Ali Asgar as Yogi
- Devadatt Paranjape
- Babloo Mukherjee

== Production ==
- Producer: Rakesh Chowdhary
- Director: Sanjiv Bhattacharya
- Story/teleplay: Ashok Patole
- Dialogue: Mir Muneer
- Camera: Bharat Nerkar
- Art director: C. S. Bhatti
