= Lathi, Gujarat =

Lathi
- Town
- Location in Gujarat, India Lathi (India)
- Coordinates: 21.45°N 71.38°E
- Country: India
- State: Gujarat
- District: Amreli
- Elevation: 141 m (463 ft)

Population (2001)
  - Total: 21,173

Languages
  - Official: Gujarati, Hindi
- Time zone: UTC+5:30 (IST)
- PIN: 365430
- Vehicle registration: GJ
- Website: gujaratindia.com

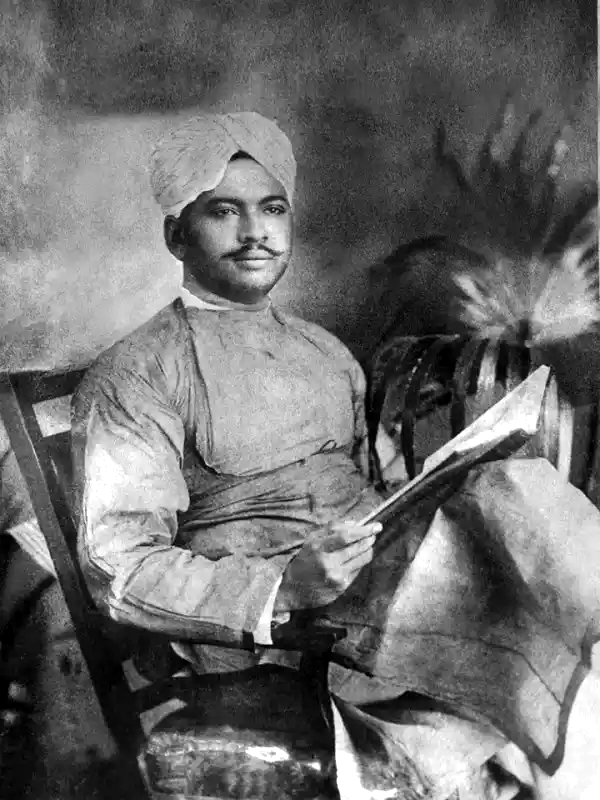
Sursinhji Takhtasinhji Gohil, Kalapi

Lathi is a town with municipality in Amreli district in the Indian state of Gujarat.

== Geography ==
Lathi is located at 21.72°N 71.38°E. It has an average elevation of 141 metres (462 feet). Popular Shree Bhurakhiya Hanumanji Mandir is located 10 km easterly to Lathi, in Bhurakhiya, Gujarat 365220.

== Demographics ==
As of 2001 India census, Lathi had a population of 20,964. Males constitute 51% of the population and females 49%. Lathi has an average literacy rate of 63%, higher than the national average of 59.5%: male literacy is 71%, and female literacy is 55%. In Lathi, 15% of the population is under 6 years of age.

== History of Lathi State ==
The rulers belonged to the Guhilot/Gahlot dynasty. The ancestor of the family was Sejakji Gohil, founding Thakore saheb of Sejakpur.(governor, commanding officer of King Kumarpal's army and right-hand man of the Solankis, a branch of the Chalukyas. Sejakji befriended Ra Mahipal, Chudasama King of Saurashtra, whose capital was Junagarh, and married his daughter Valumkunverba (Amarkunvari) to Khengar (Kawat), the heir apparent (Jayamal) of Saurashtra. Sejakji received Shahpur along with 24 villages in jagir, in the midst of which he founded a capital in 1250, naming it Sejakpur after himself. He added 40 villages by force of arms, and died in 1254.) His fourth son, Thakore Saheb Sarangji, founded the predecessor state of Arthila and his descendants ruled there for four generations till Mandalika III of Junagadh conquered and sacked Arthila and slew Thakore Saheb Dudoji, the then ruling chieftain. The Gohils of Arthila then withdrew to Lathi which they held till the merger of the State in 1948. Lathi ranks as a Fourth Class state in Kathiawar. The Chief maintains a military force of 12 cavalry, 25 infantry and 10 guns (as of 1892).

== Hamirji Gohil ==
There is stirring tale of Hamirji Gohil, The 16 year old newly married prince of Lathi, Who sacrificed his life in 1299 defending the Somnath temple from the attack of Alauddin Khalji. Hamirji gohil's cenotaph still stands at the entrance to the fabled somnath temple. Hamirji had said, "Bhale koi aave na aave maari saathe, pan hoon jais Somnath ni sakhate" (Whether anyone comes or not comes with me, but I will go to protect Somnath).

== Other people from Lathi ==
Bhagvanji Jagjivan Sharma, Air Marshal JanakKumarsinhji Gohil of Lathi, IGP Pravinsinhji Gohil of Lathi, Late Thakursaheb of Lathi Bhupendrasinhji Gohil, Late Dr.Keshavsinhji Harisinhji Gohil Founder of Shree Kalapi Memorial Foundation Trust. Dr.Lavkumarsinhji Keshavsinhji Gohil President of Shree Kalapi Memorial Foundation Trust who have conducted more than 356 Free Medical Health camp at free of cost. National Vice President- Akhil Bhartiya Kshtriya Mahasabha Vijaysinhji Lavkumarsinhji Gohil.
