= Munir Khan =

Indian businessman

- Occupation: Businessman

Munir Khan is an Indian businessman and self-proclaimed scientist.

Khan was arrested in 2008, 2009, and 2010 for falsely claiming that his product, "Body Revival", cured cancer. He was again arrested in 2014 and 2015, following complaints by the Indian Food and Drug Administration (FDA) for further false claims about his product. In March 2016, the FDA and Amboli police raided Khan's office in Andheri, and seized 2,099 bottles of Body Revival worth Rs3.3 crore. Khan had claimed the product cured HIV/AIDS, diabetes, heart ailments, tumours, stress, and reversed premature ageing.
