= Amit Tandon =

Indian television actor

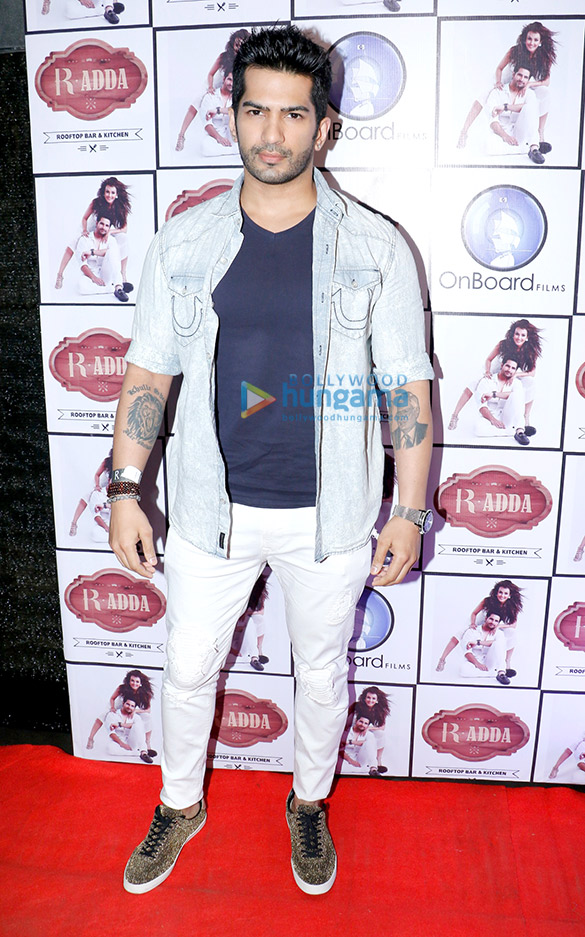
- Tandon at Launch of Nisha Rawal’s single ‘Aye Dil Hai Mushkil’
- Born: 11 April
- Occupations: Actor; musician
- Years active: 2004–2018
- Known for: Kaisa Ye Pyar Hai; Yeh Hai Mohabbatein; Kasam Tere Pyaar Ki; Dill Mill Gayye; Indian Idol 1
- Spouse: Ruby Tandon (m. 2007)
- Children: 1
- Website: amittandonmusic.com

Amit Tandon (born 11 April) is an Indian singer, musician, and a television actor. His career in the entertainment industry started after he participated in the reality show Indian Idol 1. He is known for playing the characters of Prithvi Bose in Kaisa Ye Pyar Hai and Dr. Abhimanyu Modi in Dill Mill Gayye. He also appeared as Subramaniam "Subbu" Chandran in Yeh Hai Mohabbatein and Abhishek Khurana in Kasam Tere Pyaar Ki.

== Career ==
Tandon came to India to participate in the country's first reality TV show and had made his way to the final round of Indian Idol 1. He was the second to be eliminated on 31 December 2004. He provided vocals for the Indian Idol 1 album and another album also featuring the Idol finalists titled Yaaron. After Idol, he was next seen as Prithvi in Kaisa Ye Pyar Hai alongside Iqbal Khan and Neha Bamb. Prithvi was a supporting character who later became an antagonist until he ended up dead in the middle of the show. He was then cast in the role of Manthan, Karan and Tanya's son, in the serial, Kyunki Saas Bhi Kabhi Bahu Thi. The show last aired on 6 November 2008. After Kyunki, his next show was the Zee TV drama, Saath Saath Banayenge Ek Aashiyaan. He played the role of an NRI, Abhay Singh.

After taking part in Indian Idol, Tandon took part in two more reality shows - Jo Jeeta Wohi Superstar and Zara Nachke Dikha. He performed in the Indian telly awards 2009 with Sara Khan on twist (Love Aaj Kal). He was also there on an episode of Laughter Ke Phatke. Since 15 January 2011, he is the host of the reality show Dadagiri Season 4 on UTV Bindass. He portrayed Dr. Abhimanyu Modi in Dill Mill Gayye opposite Nikita Malhotra (portrayed by Shweta Gulati). He is also seen as Jimmy/Rahul in Jeannie Aur Juju.

In 2008, Tandon released his debut solo album, Tanha - Lonely at Heart on Tips.

In 2015, he portrayed Subbu Chandran in Yeh Hai Mohabbatein and in 2017, Abhishek Khurana in Kasam Tere Pyaar Ki.

== Personal life ==
In 2007, he married Ruby Tandon, a dermatologist, with whom he has a daughter named Jiyana. They separated in 2017, but reconciled in 2019.

== Filmography ==
=== Films ===
| Year | Show | Role |
|---|---|---|
| 2014 | Creature 3D | Arjun |

=== Television ===
| Year | Show | Role |
|---|---|---|
| 2004 | Indian Idol 1 | Contestant |
| 2005–2006 | Kaisa Ye Pyar Hai | Prithvi Bose |
| 2006 | Karam Apnaa Apnaa | Natesh |
| 2006–2007 | Kyunki Saas Bhi Kabhi Bahu Thi | Manthan Virani |
| 2007 | Bhabhi | Nihal |
| 2008 | Saath Saath Banayenge Ek Aashiyaan | Abhay Singh |
| 2008 | Jo Jeeta Wohi Superstar | Contestant |
| 2008 | Zara Nachke Dikha | Contestant |
| 2008 | Jalwa Four 2 Ka 1 | Contestant |
| 2008–2010 | Dill Mill Gayye | Dr. Abhimanyu Modi |
| 2010 | Laughter Ke Phatke | Himself |
| 2011 | Dadagiri | Host |
| 2012 | Hum Ne Li Hai...Shapath | Sumit |
| 2012 | Sapnon Hai Pyaar Ki Kahaani | Sumeet Singh |
| 2013 | Welcome – Baazi Mehmaan Nawazi Ki | Contestant |
| 2013 | Jeannie Aur Juju | Rahul Chaturvedi |
| 2014 | Saath Nibhaana Saathiya | Nishant |
| 2015 | Bhanwar | Advocate Rohit Rajput |
| 2015 | Adaalat | Public Prosecutor Mr. Jain |
| 2015 | Ye Hai Mohabbatein | Dr. Subramaniam "Subbu" Chandran |
| 2015 | Meri Aashiqui Tumse Hi | Rajat |
| 2015 | Pyaar Tune Kya Kiya | Professor Akash |
| 2016 | Adaalat (season 2) | Monty Khanna |
| 2016 | Dil Deke Dekho | Kamal Chopra |
| 2017–2018 | Kasam Tere Pyaar Ki | Abhishek Khurana |

=== Discography ===
| Year | Title | Label |
|---|---|---|
| 2005 | Indian Idol 1 | Sony BMG |
| 2005 | Yaaron | Sony BMG |
| 2008 | Tanha - Lonely at Heart | Tips |
