= Saath Saath =

Saath Saath may refer to:

- Saath Saath (film), a 1982 Hindi language film
- Saath Saath (Zee TV series), a drama-series appeared on the Indian satellite channel Zee TV in early 2000s
- Saath Saath (DD2 TV series), a Hindi-language television serial aired on India's local national channel DD National
- Saath Saath Banayenge Ek Aashiyaan, a television serial aired on Zee TV channel in 2007 until 2008
