= Commander Karan Saxena =

Indian television series

- Genre: Action; Espionage; Thriller
- Based on: Commander Karan Saxena
- Written by: Vivek Malik, Jay Sheela Bansal, Jatin Wagle
- Directed by: Jatin Wagle
- Starring: Gurmeet Choudhary; Iqbal Khan; Hruta Durgule
- Country of origin: India
- Original language: Hindi
- No. of episodes: 20

Production
- Producers: Rajeshwar Nair; Krishnan Iyer
- Running time: 30 minutes
- Production company: Keylight Productions

Original release
- Network: Disney+ Hotstar
- Release: 8 July – 2 August 2024

Commander Karan Saxena is an Indian Hindi-language action espionage thriller television series. Produced by Rajeshwar Nair and Krishnan Iyer under the banner Keylight Productions, it stars Gurmeet Choudhary, Iqbal Khan and Hruta Durgule. The series premiered on 8 July 2024 on Disney+ Hotstar.

== Cast ==
- Gurmeet Choudhary as Commander Karan Saxena
- Iqbal Khan as ISI Chief Nasir Khan
- Hruta Durgule as Rachna Mhatre
- Sanyam Srivastav as Abhay
- Ami Anand Raut as Moosa

== Production ==
The series was announced on Disney+ Hotstar by Keylight Productions. It is based on Amit Khan's Commander Karan Saxena. Gurmeet Choudhary, Iqbal Khan and Hruta Durgule were signed as the lead. The filming of the series concluded in June 2024. The teaser was released on 11 June 2024, followed by the trailer of the series.

== Reception ==
Sonal Pandya from Times Now gave the series a rating of 3 stars.

Pratidin Time also reviewed the series.

== See also ==
- List of Disney+ Hotstar original programming
