= Reeta Sanyal =

- Release poster
- Genre: Legal; Comedy drama
- Written by: Amit Khan; Deeptak Das
- Directed by: Abhirup Ghosh
- Starring: Adah Sharma; Rahul Dev; Manik Papneja; Ankur Rathee
- Country of origin: India
- Original language: Hindi
- No. of episodes: 20

Production
- Producers: Rajeshwar Nair; Krishnan Iyer
- Running time: 17-27 minutes
- Production company: Keylight Productions

Original release
- Network: Disney+ Hotstar
- Release: 14 October 2024 – present

Reeta Sanyal is an Indian Hindi-language pulp legal thriller TV series directed by Abhirup Ghosh. The show is based on Amit Khan's series of crime thriller novels named Reeta Sanyal Ke Mukkadmein (translation: Reeta Sanyal's lawsuits). It was written and adapted for screen by Deeptak Das. Produced by Rajeshwar Nair and Krishnan Iyer under the banner Keylight Productions, it stars Adah Sharma, Rahul Dev, Manik Papneja and Ankur Rathee. The series premiered on 14 October 2024 on Disney+ Hotstar.

== Cast ==
- Adah Sharma as Reeta Sanyal
- Rahul Dev as M. Raj Thakral
- Manik Papneja as Ishan Dwivedi
- Ankur Rathee as Jai Vardhan
- Nirisha Basnett as Zi
- Surbhi Talodiya as Pari
- Mukesh Agrohari as Acid Anna

== Production ==
The series was announced on Disney+ Hotstar by Keylight Productions. Hina Khan was considered for the role before it went to Adah Sharma. Principal photography of the series commenced in Mumbai. The trailer of the series was released on 4 October 2024.

== Reception ==
According to Ormax Media, which estimates audience views, Reeta Sanyal secured the second spot on the list of the most-watched streaming originals in India, with approx. 2.5 million views each week. Reeta Sanyal became the most-watched fictional series on OTT during its run.

Sarthak of Gurucool writes "What sets Reeta Sanyal apart from other thrillers is its ability to evoke genuine emotion while maintaining the suspenseful thrill". The Production and the lead performances were praised. Entertainment Portal Binged Bureau wrote "Adah Sharma is a perfect choice to play the titular character Reeta. Her portrayal makes the role more vulnerable and witty. She’s relatable and you end up rooting for her". Lipika Verma of Deccan Chronicle writes "Adah Sharma Shines in Reeta Sanyal, embraces diverse roles".

== See also ==
- List of Disney+ Hotstar original programming
