= Pilkhuva =

Pilkhuva may refer to

- Pilkhuva, a village in Azamgarh, Mehnagar, Uttar Pradesh
- Pilkhuva (Ghaziabad), Uttar Pradesh
- Pilkhuwa, a town in Ghaziabad, Uttar Pradesh
