= Undekhi =

Indian web series

- Genre: Crime Thriller
- Created by: Sidharth Sengupta
- Written by: Siddharth Sengupta; Varun Badola; Umesh Padalkar; Mohinder Pratap Singh; Chirag Salian; Abhishek Garg
- Directed by: Ashish R. Shukla
- Starring: Dibyendu Bhattacharya; Surya Sharma; Anchal Singh; Harsh Chhaya; Ankur Rathee; Varun Badola; Abhishek Chauhan; Ayn Zoya; Apeksha Porwal; Gautam Rode
- Composers: Anuj Danait; Shivam Sengupta
- Country of origin: India
- Original language: Hindi
- No. of seasons: 4
- No. of episodes: 36

Production
- Producers: Sameer Nair; Siddharth Sengupta; Jyoti Sagar; Deepak Segal
- Production location: India
- Cinematography: Murzy Pagdiwala
- Editors: Rajesh G. Pandey; Sourabh Prabhudesai
- Running time: 30-35 Minutes
- Production companies: Applause Entertainment; Edgestorm Ventures; Banijay Asia

Original release
- Network: SonyLIV
- Release: 10 July 2020 – 1 May 2026

Undekhi (English: Unseen) is an Indian Hindi-language crime thriller web television series which premiered on SonyLIV on 10 July 2020. It is produced by Applause Entertainment and Edgestorm Ventures. The series depicts the two aspects of the society - the power-drunk influential people who think they can get away with anything and the oppressed, subjected to years of torture, who finally decide to bring themselves to justice.

Undekhi season 2 was released on 4 March 2022 and season 3 was released on 10 May 2024. Season 4 was released on 1 May 2026.

== Premise ==
=== Season 1 ===
Undekhi begins in Sunderbans but soon shifts to Manali. In less than 30 minutes, viewers witness two murders. DSP Barun Ghosh (Dibyendu Bhattacharya) is investigating the Sunderban murder of a policeman, whose mutilated body is found in the forest. Two tribal girls are on the run and Ghosh, who suspects them to be the killers is on their trail.

=== Season 2 ===
With the cliff-hanging end of season one of Undekhi, a new face called Abhaya finds Koyal and rescues her. On the other hand, Teji is determined to destroy the Atwal, and Daman is onboard with her. This season has the wedding of Rinku Paaji. Shashwat and Saloni manage to escape and are in hiding. The Atwal's are all set to expand their operations and unleash a reign of terror, by forging powerful business alliances with international drug dealers. However, the family is increasingly estranged and soon it becomes a massive conflict of power and position.

=== Season 3 ===
'Undekhi' is back with Season 3! When ghosts from the past come back to haunt the Atwals, it throws a wrench into Papaji’s plans for the family empire. Can the Atwals pull together and stand strong in the face of the threat, or will they fall to vengeance? The crime thriller stars Harsh Chhaya, Dibyendu Bhattacharya, Surya Sharma, Ankur Rathee, Ayn Zoya, Aanchal Singgh, Shivangi Singh and Varun Badola.

== Cast and characters ==
=== Season 1 ===
- Dibyendu Bhattacharya as DSP Barun Ghosh, a policeman from West Bengal.
- Surya Sharma as Rinku Atwal aka Rajendra Singh Atwal
- Harsh Chhaya as Papaji
- Anchal Singh as Teji Grewal Atwal
- Ankur Rathee as Daman Atwal, Papaji's son
- Abhishek Chauhan as Rishi, the videographer
- Ayn Zoya as Saloni, head of wedding film team
- Apeksha Porwal as Koyal, Adivasi girl from Sundarbans
- Karmveer Choudhary as Kandpal
- Mandeep Bamra as Lovely Singh
- Diwakar Kumar Jha as Timma
- Diwakar Dhayani as Sunil Dogra, the local police chief
- Vaarun Bhagat as Lucky
- Sayandeep Sengupta as Shashwat Sinha
- Meenakshi Sethi as Papaji's wife
- Shivaani Sopuri as Rinku's Mother
- Shivangi Singh as Muskaan
- Bikramjeet Kanwarpal as Mr. Dhaundiyal
- Olivia Merey as Alice
- Anit Chauhann as Shera
- Anuj Sharma as Prahlad Negi
- Diwakar Dhyani as Insp. Sunil Dogra

=== Season 2 ===
- Dibyendu Bhattacharya as DSP Barun Ghosh
- Surya Sharma as Rinku Atwal aka Rajendra Singh Atwal
- Harsh Chhaya as Papaji
- Anchal Singh as Teji Grewal Atwal
- Ankur Rathee as Daman Atwal, Papaji's son
- Ayn Zoya as Saloni, head of wedding film team
- Apeksha Porwal as Koyal
- Diwakar Kumar Jha as Timma
- Vaarun Bhagat as Lucky
- Sayandeep Sengupta as Shashwat Sinha
- Meenakshi Sethi as Papaji's wife
- Shivaani Sopuri as Rinku's Mother
- Shivangi Singh as Muskaan
- Meiyang Chang as Abhay
- Jamie Alter as Issac Azra
- Breshna Khan as Gerri Esher
- Tej Sapru as Arjan Singh
- Nandish Sandhu as Samarth
- Anit Chauhann as Shera
- Diwakar Dhyani as Insp. Sunil Dogra

=== Season 3 ===
- Harsh Chhaya as Papaji
- Dibyendu Bhattacharya as DSP Barun Ghosh
- Surya Sharma as Rinku Atwal (Rajendra Singh Atwal)
- Ankur Rathee as Daman Atwal
- Anchal Singh as Teji Grewal Atwal
- Ayn Zoya as Saloni
- Shivangi Singh as Muskaan
- Varun Badola as Rajveer Malhotra
- Diwakar Dhayani as Sunil Dogra
- Meenakshi Sethi as Papaji's wife
- Shivaani Sopuri as Rinku's mother
- Vaarun Bhagat as Lucky
- Lavina Tandon as SI Rashi Dangwal
- Sayandeep Sengupta as Shashwat Sinha
- Heli Daruwala as Geet
- Shruthy Menon as Deepika
- Rahul Bagga as ASP Satinder Singh
- Vijay Vikram Singh as Adv Sundarlal Bajaj
- Anit Chauhann as Shera
- Omna Harjani as Kavita Mathur

=== Season 4 ===
- Harsh Chhaya as Papaji/Surinder Singh Atwal
- Dibyendu Bhattacharya as SP Barun Ghosh
- Surya Sharma as Rinku Atwal (Rajendra Singh Atwal)
- Ankur Rathee as Daman Atwal
- Anchal Singh as Teji Grewal Atwal
- Ayn Zoya as Saloni
- Varun Badola as Rajveer Malhotra/Mahinder Singh Atwal
- Diwakar Dhayani as Sunil Dogra
- Meenakshi Sethi as Papaji's wife
- Vaarun Bhagat as Lucky
- Lavina Tandon as SI Rashi Dangwal
- Shruthy Menon as Deepika
- Gautam Rode as Vikram Sonuja
- Shivjyoti Rajput as Natasha
- Saqib Ayub as DJ
- Daksh Ajit Singh as Jogi Dhillon
- Saurav Khurana as Bobby Dhillon
- Garvil Mohan as Sukhi Dhillon
- Manik Papneja as Rehaan
- Luke Kenny as Unknown Man
- Anit Chauhan as Shera
- Akhil Khattar as Bagga
- Niketan Sharma as Navdeep
- Debatamma Saha as Preeti
- Omna Harjani as Kavita Mathur
- Heli Daruwala as Geet

== Seasons ==
| Series | Episodes | Originally released |
|---|---|---|
| 1 | 10 | 10 July 2020 |
| 2 | 10 | 4 March 2022 |
| 3 | 8 | 10 May 2024 |
| 4 | 8 | 1 May 2026 |

=== Season 1 ===
| No. | Title | Directed by | Written by | Original release date |
|---|---|---|---|---|
| 1 | "The Things That Men Do" | Ashish R. Shukla | Varun Badola, Umesh Padalkar, Siddharth Sengupta, Mohinder Pratap Singh | July 10, 2020 |
Rishi and Saloni, two filmmakers travel to Manali for a wedding shoot. Rishi accidentally records the murder of 'dancing girl' by groom's father and struggles with his conscience.
| 2 | "Is This For Real" | Ashish R. Shukla | Varun Badola, Umesh Padalkar, Siddharth Sengupta, Mohinder Pratap Singh | July 10, 2020 |
Rishi makes a horrific discovery in the doghouse next to resort. Saloni tries to get his focus on the work but Rinku and his cousins are on to Rishi. He must come up with Plan B. DSP Ghosh, senses a cover up and heads to resort.
| 3 | "For cash only" | Ashish R. Shukla | Varun Badola, Umesh Padalkar, Siddharth Sengupta, Mohinder Pratap Singh | July 10, 2020 |
DSP Ghosh interrogates Saloni and team to Rinku's chagrin and finds discrepancies in their stories. Meanwhile, the wedding ceremonies continues. Teji confronts Daman about the shooting. Saloni cracks a deal with Rinku in exchange for Rishi's silence.
| 4 | "Double Shuffle" | Ashish R. Shukla | Varun Badola, Umesh Padalkar, Siddharth Sengupta, Mohinder Pratap Singh | July 10, 2020 |
DSP Ghosh arrives with search warrant on wedding day. Lucky manages to get Rishi, Koyal and Praful out of the doghouse just in time. But someone is on their trail. An angry Teji lashes out at Daman and the wedding comes to an abrupt halt.
| 5 | "Catch The Tiger By The Tail" | Ashish R. Shukla | Varun Badola, Umesh Padalkar, Siddharth Sengupta, Mohinder Pratap Singh | July 10, 2020 |
DSP Ghosh gets a hard time in chasing Rishi, Praful with the help of Koyal. Saloni tells Teji about the murder and her predicament. Riku lays a trap on Rishi and pins murder of lovely on him.
| 6 | "The Can Of Worms" | Ashish R. Shukla | Varun Badola, Umesh Padalkar, Siddharth Sengupta, Mohinder Pratap Singh | July 10, 2020 |
Rishi manages to contact Saloni at resort. Pressure mounts on Ghosh and he has a chance to encounter with Teji. Daman tells truth to Teji and she has a tough decision to make ahead. Meanwhile, Lucky is in for a surprise.
| 7 | "You Have It Coming" | Ashish R. Shukla | Varun Badola, Umesh Padalkar, Siddharth Sengupta, Mohinder Pratap Singh | July 10, 2020 |
Rinku forces Teji to continue with the wedding ceremonies. Forest officials are chasing the fugitives whereabouts. Shashwat tries to get in touch with Rishi. Teji surprises everyone with her latest stance of handling family business and not going to America after wedding. DSP Ghosh gives a showdown to Rinku and Papaji.
| 8 | "We Have Got Ourselves A Deal" | Ashish R. Shukla | Varun Badola, Umesh Padalkar, Siddharth Sengupta, Mohinder Pratap Singh | July 10, 2020 |
Rinku gets better of DSP Ghosh. Shashwat & Alice arrives in Manali and sucked into the desperate situation immediately. Rinku receives a package and soon realises that the power is shifting away from him and makes a cunning move.
| 9 | "You Are Safe When Dead" | Ashish R. Shukla | Varun Badola, Umesh Padalkar, Siddharth Sengupta, Mohinder Pratap Singh | July 10, 2020 |
Lucky manages to find Rishi and his friends, but they manages to escape. Timma finds the murder video shot by Rishi and gives it to the gang. It becomes last line of defence for Rishi. Rinku decides to handle this matter on his own.
| 10 | "An Ace In My Hand" | Ashish R. Shukla | Varun Badola, Umesh Padalkar, Siddharth Sengupta, Mohinder Pratap Singh | July 10, 2020 |
As the dust settles after killing, Papaji and Rinku has new plans for Teji. Koyal manages to meet DSP Ghosh and he got to know all missing pieces of Sundarban puzzle. Rinku and DSP Ghosh tries to outwit each other with the local cops on Rinku's side.

=== Season 2 ===
| No | Title | Episode Synopsis | Original Release Date |
|---|---|---|---|
| 1 | The Wild Goose Chase | The search for Koyal continues. Rinku is furious as he is not getting anywhere except killing Saloni’s team. Shashwat and Saloni manage to escape. | 4 March 2022 |
| 2 | Needle in a Haystack | Teji contacts DSP for leads against the Atwals before he leaves. Lucky messes up the task given to him by Rinku and sets Timma free. | 4 March 2022 |
| 3 | Might of the Atwal Empire | Samarth - a hurdle in Atwal’s plans of business expansion. Teji convinces Daman to join her and save Shashwat and Saloni. | 4 March 2022 |
| 4 | True Lies | Wedding preparations have kick-started for Rinku and Muskaan but multiple obstacles await their big day. | 4 March 2022 |
| 5 | Wedding Bells make a Loud Sound | Rinku is aware of the culprits who robbed an important truck. Daman and Teji know about Saloni’s situation. | 4 March 2022 |
| 6 | Revenge is Best Served Cold | A recovered Koyal makes her first attempt to kill Papaji. Daman & Teji partner with Samarth against Rinku. Saloni and Shashwat double cross Teji by making a getaway deal. | 4 March 2022 |
| 7 | The Girl and the Cop | DSP Ghosh makes progress with Koyal’s investigation. Abhaya and Koyal are up to no good. Rinku faces multiple problems with the missing drugs and Koyal’s attack. | 4 March 2022 |
| 8 | Goons, Guns and Bombs | Abhaya plans to plant explosives in Atwal’s company. After multiple unsuccessful consignments, Rinku takes charge of the mission. | 4 March 2022 |
| 9 | The Hunter is Now the Hunted | Rinku teams up with Papaji’s old friend and the leader of the infamous Ghatak gang. Samarth tries his best to put pressure on the Atwals. | 4 March 2022 |
| 10 | That’s the Way the Cookie Crumbles | Old players reappear as do some new ones with everyone’s life on stake with all the planning and plotting. Each one has a motive to take down the other – driven by their thirst for power, revenge and love. | 4 March 2022 |

=== Season 3 ===
| No | Title | Episode Synopsis | Original Release Date |
|---|---|---|---|
| 1 | Skeletons in the Closet | Papaji recovers from injuries and drinking. Rinku tries reviving the business. Teji's own plans spark tension and struggle. Guilt-ridden Ghosh becomes reclusive after Koyal's death. A new mysterious entity arises against the Atwals. | 10 May 2024 |
| 2 | Catch Me If You Can | Ghosh arrives in Manali and assumes leadership of a team which has been put together to arrest Papaji for Kanak's murder. Daman hires a lawyer to defend Papaji while Rinku scrambles to put together a plan to thwart Ghosh. | 10 May 2024 |
| 3 | Bite the Bullet | Ghosh manages to outwit the Atwals and finally arrests Papaji. Rinku has a confrontation with the new player in town, Rajveer Malhotra who offers him a partnership. Samarth is on the run and asks for Ghosh's help in exchange for information. However, Rinku is hot on his trail which leads to a climatic showdown. | 10 May 2024 |
| 4 | Game, Set, but Match? | Papaji's trial date gets nearer and Ghosh scrambles to gather new evidence. Rinku goes on a rampage, determined to destroy his enemies. However, Ghosh discovers a chink in Rinku's armour and makes a startling discovery which threatens to blow the case wide open. | 10 May 2024 |
| 5 | Trial by Fire | The trial is underway and the Atwals are under fire from Ghosh and the prosecution. Papaji's freedom is at stake and just when all hope looks lost, Rinku pulls a rabbit out of the hat and all hell breaks loose. | 10 May 2024 |
| 6 | It's Not Over Till It's Over | Ghosh suffers a huge loss and is broken after another setback in his war against the Atwals. But he sees a ray of hope when he discovers a hidden link between the Atwals and Rajveer Malhotra. Rinku celebrates with a family, unaware that a storm is coming. | 10 May 2024 |
| 7 | The Darkest Hour | Teji's lying and scheming catches up to her as she desperately tries to keep her world from unravelling. Rinku and Daman discover the betrayal of a trusted ally and are hell bent on revenge. Papaji is plagued by the ghosts from his past which leads to a devastating conclusion. | 10 May 2024 |
| 8 | Karma is a Bitch | Rinku's world is shattered as he goes on a rampage, determined to make his enemy pay. But in the process he makes a shocking discovery which turns his life upside down. | 10 May 2024 |

== Reception ==
=== Season 1 ===
Undekhi received mostly positive reviews from critics and audiences. Rajkumar Rao appreciated the show on twitter on the date of the release on his twitter page. Pramit Chatterjee of Mashable said it an Impressive show quoting "Undekhi is made of stories and people that we’ve met whose actions make them live in our minds rent-free. It’s what builds the sentiment that we as a nation are truly not free. Yes, the British have left us. But what about our privilege, classism, racism, communal divisions, power dynamics, corruption, etc? Did they take it with them? No. It still exists." Ronak Kotecha of The Times of India said it "An Engrossing and Gritty Crime Drama" giving it 3.5 stars out of 5. Avinash Ramachandran of Indian Express praised the performances of the actors saying "Competent performances power this thriller".

=== Season 2 ===
Undekhi Season 2 received a number of positive responses from the audience. The Times of India gave the show 3.5 stars, "Apart from a crisp script, ‘Undekhi 2’ boasts of solid performances." Filmibeat lauded the performance with "Surya Sharma & Anchal Singh once again impress with their deadly chemistry as they go head to head for power in the Atwal family."

The Free Press Journal's words for the show were, "With the kind of performances this one had, one hopes that there is more. A brilliant show indeed!". Undekhi Season 2 tops Season 1 with delicious mysteries & exhilarating chase scenes", India Forums noted.

Undekhi season 2 is more of the same, and at the top of the game – said Subhask K Jha of Bollyspice. Bizasia gave the show 4 stars and quoted "It doesn't go unnoticed that the colorful characters from the first season return with a bang in this second part."

== Controversies ==
As a part of the promotional activity, citizens received 'fake murder calls' from the network. The call has a man's trembling voice saying that he has witnessed a murder and that he is about to get murdered too. At the end of the call, it is revealed that this is a promotional call for the web show. Many people started taking the call seriously, and took to Twitter to express shock. Finally, Sony LIV tweeted that it was a promotional activity. “If you have received a call for our show...and it has disturbed you, we would like to sincerely apologize to you. This was a test activity which has gone out accidentally,” it said.
