= Kaisa Ye Pyar Hai =

Indian drama television series

- Genre: Drama
- Created by: Ekta Kapoor
- Screenplay by: Damini Kanwal Shetty; Bharvi Shah; Sonali Jaffar; Fatima Rangila; Sharad Tripathi; Archita Biswas; Deepti Rawal
- Story by: Nina Arora; Bobby Bhonsle; Binita Desai
- Directed by: Jitu Arora
- Starring: See Below
- Opening theme: "Kaisa Ye Pyar Hai" performed by Kunal Ganjawala and Priya Bhattacharya
- Country of origin: India
- Original language: Hindi
- No. of seasons: 1
- No. of episodes: 331

Production
- Producers: Ekta Kapoor; Shobha Kapoor
- Cinematography: Deepak Malwankar; Santosh Suryavanshi; Nikhil Sinha
- Editors: Sanjeev Shukla; Dhirendra Singh; Rohan Sawant
- Running time: 24 minutes
- Production company: Balaji Telefilms

Original release
- Network: Sony Entertainment Television
- Release: 29 March 2005 – 5 October 2006

Kaisa Ye Pyar Hai (transl. How Is This Love) is an Indian series that aired on Sony Entertainment Television, produced by Balaji Telefilms, starring Iqbal Khan as Angad Khanna and Neha Bamb as Kripa Sharma. The show ended on 5 October 2006.

== Plot ==
Angad Khanna is a popular playboy rockstar who takes life as it is. Kripa is a small-town girl from the foothills of Himalayas who comes to Mumbai with big dreams. Circumstances force these two opposites towards each other and hence starts their passionate, often volatile love story.

== Cast ==
- Neha Bamb as Kripa Sharma / Kripa Prithvi Bose / Kripa Angad Khanna / Tanya
- Iqbal Khan as Angad Khanna / Zaib / Rishi Agarwal
- Suvarna Jha as Mishti Bose / Mishti Mittal
- Amit Tandon as Prithvi Bose
- Hiten Tejwani as Nishant Saxena
- Gauri Pradhan Tejwani as Kanan
- Chetan Hansraj as Josh
- Rohit Bakshi as Advocate Shabbir Ahluwalia
- Jaya Bhattacharya as Damini Bose
- Faizan Kidwai as Kartik Khanna
- Ranvijay Razdan as Dilip Khanna
- Shilpa Tulaskar as Avantika Agarwal
- Sujata Sehgal / Sonia Kapoor as Naina Khanna
- Aashish Kaul as Advocate Verma
- Gagan Malik as Manan
- Khushi Dubey as Sur Khanna
- Dhruv as Prateek Khanna
- Manasi Varma / Arunima Sharma as Aliya
- Preeti Gupta as Anita Manik Bhasin
- Ashlesha Sawant as Sheetal
- Brinda Parekh / Barkha Bisht as Simone
- Manasi Parekh as Tanya
- Dalljiet Kaur as Tanaaz "Tanzy"
- Tuhina Vohra as Gayatri Suryabhan Sharma
- Rio Kapadia as Professor Suryabhan Sharma
- Maya Alagh as Devyani Khanna
- Nitin Arora as Teddy
- Amita Nangia as Netra
- Shivalika Sharma as Harshini
- Alihassan Turabi / Anuj Gupta as Advocate Manik Bhasin
- Prabhat Bhattacharya as Advocate Vikram
- Salim Shah as D.K. Saxena
- Rocky Verma as Underworld Shooter
- Abhijeet Sawant as Himself (Guest Appearance)
- Sandeep Acharya as Himself (Guest Appearance)
- Pallavi Kulkarni as Herself (Guest Appearance)
- Manini Mishra as Host (Guest Appearance)
- Anu Malik as Himself (Guest Appearance)
- Nigaar Khan as Herself (Guest Appearance)
- Aashka Goradia as Kumud (Guest Appearance)
- Gurpreet Singh as Sujal (Guest Appearance)
- Manav Gohil as Angad's Detective Friend (Guest Appearance)

== Soundtracks ==
No.	Title	Length
1.	"Kaisa Ye Pyar Hai Title Song"	1.37
2.	"Kaisa Ye Pyar Hai Full Song Sad"	10.12
