= Sidharth Sengupta =

Indian television director, writer and producer (born 20th century)

- Born: 9 April 1967 (age 59); Ladakh
- Occupations: Director, writer, producer
- Years active: 1997 – present
- Known for: Balika Vadhu; Undekhi; Apharan; Yeh Kaali Kaali Ankhein
- Spouse: Sujata Sengupta (m. 1992)
- Children: 1

Sidharth Sengupta (born 20th century) is an Indian television director, writer and producer.

== Career ==
His directing career includes the television soap opera Balika Vadhu (2008–2026) on Colors TV and 26/11 on Life Ok television.

He has produced, directed and written web series, including the action thriller Apharan (2018) on Alt Balaji, the crime thriller Undekhi (2020–2024) on SonyLIV and the romantic crime thriller Yeh Kaali Kaali Ankhein (2022) on Netflix.

== Films ==
=== As director ===
- Good Luck Jerry (2022) – a remake of Kolamaavu Kokila, a 2018 Tamil movie directed by Nelson Dilipkumar

=== Television ===
- Tanha
- 9 Malabar Hill (producer)
- Balika Vadhu
- Radha Ki Betiyaan kuch kardhikhayengi
- Saakshi
- Rangrasiya
- Kehta hain Dil Jee le zara
- Tum Saath ho Jab Apne
- D4 – Get Up and Dance
- Meri Bhabhi
- Jyoti
- Godh Bharaai
- Chabbis Barah (26/12)
- Dil Sambhal Jaa Zara (producer)
- Aap Joh Bole Haan toh Haan (producer)
- Un Hazaaron Ke Naam
- Ek Chabbi Hain Pados Mein
- Karishma: A Miracle of Destiny

=== Web series ===
- Apharan (writer, producer, director)
- Undekhi (writer, producer, director)
- Yeh Kaali Kaali Ankhein (writer, producer, director)
- Aar Ya Paar (writer, producer, director)
