= Hallo (film) =

- Theatrical release poster
- Directed by: Rafi Mecartin
- Written by: Rafi Mecartin
- Produced by: Joy Thomas Shakthikulangara
- Starring: Mohanlal; Parvati Melton; Siddique; Jagathy Sreekumar; Saiju Kurup; Salim Kumar; Madu
- Cinematography: Sanjeev Shankar
- Edited by: Don Max
- Music by: Alex Paul
- Production company: Jithin Arts
- Distributed by: Marickar Release
- Release date: 5 July 2007
- Running time: 146 minutes
- Country: India
- Language: Malayalam

Hallo is a 2007 Indian Malayalam-language black comedy thriller film written and directed by the Rafi Mecartin duo. It stars Mohanlal and Parvathy Melton (in her Malayalam debut), with Siddique, Jagathy Sreekumar, K. B. Ganesh Kumar, Madhu, and Saiju Kurup in important roles. The music was composed by Alex Paul. The film received positive reviews from critics, with critics particularly praising Mohanlal"s performance. The film was a blockbuster at the box office.

It was remade in Telugu as Naa Style Veru (2009) and in Kannada as Manjunatha BA LLB (2012). The plot of the movie was reported to have been partially borrowed from the 2004 movie Cellular.

== Plot ==
Sivaraman is a once-brilliant criminal lawyer who is now in a self-destructive mode; being constantly in a highly intoxicated state. His clients had abandoned him a long time ago, except one devout follower, Chandy. Whenever Sivaraman gets into one of his drunken brawls, Chandy rescues him.

Strangely, that doesn't diminish Sivaraman's public relations skills. After one particularly bad fight, he ends up becoming good friends with three notorious rowdies in the area: Vadakkancherry Vakkachen / 'Vedakku' Vakkan, Bathery Bappu / Kolakolli, and Pattambi Ravi / 'Chattambi' Ravi. Soon, they too join his circle of loyalists.

The reason why this once-hotshot advocate had hit the bottle is revealed later. He was in love with a girl named Priya and his father and brother weren't happy about it. They come up with a very cruel way of ending the relationship. They lock Sivaraman in a room in the house on the day Sivaraman and Priya decide to elope. Priya, unaware of this happening, waits for Sivaraman. A group of gangsters sees Priya waiting late into the night, molests her, and then kills her. When Sivaraman finds out, he is devastated and reacts by becoming an alcoholic.

One day, he receives a phone call on his mobile phone from a stranger named Parvathi. She reveals that she is the daughter of a local Marwari banker. On the phone, she tells him that her life is in grave danger and begs him to rescue her.

Parvathi is the daughter of Bada Bhai, the owner of a very successful bank - Dalal & Dalal. The bank is jointly owned by him and his brothers and relatives. They want to take control of the bank by killing Parvathi. When Sivaraman finds out that the threat is from her family, he takes her home and pretends to be her husband.

Then begins the battle of wits and muscles with her greedy relatives. Slowly, Parvathi gets impressed by his brilliance and ends up falling in love with him.

== Cast ==
- Mohanlal as Advocate Sivaraman Nambiar
- Parvati Melton as Parvathi
- Siddique as Mahesh Bhai
- Jagathy Sreekumar as Chandykkunju / Chandy, Sivaraman's Friend
- Madhu as Bada Bhai, Parvathi's Father
- K. B. Ganesh Kumar as ASP Sudheesh Nambiar IPS, Sivaraman's Younger Brother
- Janardhanan as Advocate M. N. Nambiar, Sivaraman's and Sudheesh's Father
- Bheeman Raghu as Bathery Bappu aka Kolakoli, Sivaraman's Friend
- Spadikam George as Vadakkancherry Vakkachen aka Vedakku Vakkan, Sivaraman's Friend
- Mohan Raj as Pattambi Ravi aka Chattambi Ravi, Sivaraman's Friend (Voiceover by Shobi Thilakan)
- Kundara Johny as City Police Commissioner Zachariah Thomas (Voiceover by Shobi Thilakan)
- Jagadish as Advocate Thomas Jacob
- Rizabawa as Dinu Bhai / John Samuel
- Suraj Venjaramoodu as S.I. Stephen
- Salim Kumar as Chidambaram
- Abu Salim as Hassan, goon
- Ajith Kollam as Karim, goon
- Fathima Babu as Lathika, Sivaraman's Mother
- Saiju Kurup as Praveen
- Madhu Warrier as Susheel Bhai
- Ashokan as Sebastian (cameo)
- Ambika Mohan as Nithya, Parvathi's relative
- Sona Nair as Liza
- Sruthy John as Seetha, Parvathi's relative
- Manka Mahesh as Bhavika, Parvathi's relative
- Remadevi as Lakshmi, Parvathi's relative
- Indulekha as Alice Sebastian
- Bindu Murali as Doctor
- Mini Arun as Vidya, Chidambaram's first wife
- Praseetha Menon as Veda, Chidambaram's second wife
- Samvrutha Sunil as Priya, Shivaraman's lover, (extended cameo appearance)

== Music ==
Hallo

Soundtrack album by Alex Paul
- Released: 2007
- Genre: Film
- Length: 27:36 mins
- Label: Satyam Audios
- Producer: Joy Thomas

Alex Paul chronology
Pothan Vava (2006)	Hallo (2007)	Alibhai (2007)

The songs were composed by Alex Paul, and the lyrics were written by Vayalar Sarath Chandra Varma.

Track	Song title	Singer(s)	Raga(s)	Duration
1	"Mazhavillin"	Afsal, Manjari, Sangeetha Sreekanth	Brindabani Sarang	4:18
2	"Kadukittu"	M. G. Sreekumar, Sangeetha Sreekanth		4:55
3	"Hallo Hallo"	Vidhu Prathap, Shweta Mohan		3:53
4	"Chellathamare"	K. S. Chithra, Sangeetha Sreekanth	Abheri	4.36
5	"Bhajan"	Manjari, Akhila Anand, Andriya	Abheri	1:06
6	"Kadukittu"	Cochin Ibrahim, Sangeetha Sreekanth		4:55
7	"Hallo Hallo"	Shweta Mohan		3:53

== Production ==
Jyothika was selected as the lead heroine, but was replaced by Parvathy due to her prior commitments in Telugu and Tamil films.

== Release ==
=== Reception ===
The film received generally positive reviews from critics. Sify gave the film a positive review writing, "What makes the film tick is that the comedy combination is perfect- they want the audience to have a nice laugh and go home happy. Mohanlal the one-man entertainment troupe carries the film on his broad shoulders. The director duo has packaged it using the star's image and their slapstick script to create a laugh riot." About the technical aspects they write, "Technically the film is ok, with Bobban's set designs ( the toddy shop set), Sanjiv Shankar's camera and Don Max's editing all which enriches the entertainer. Songs by Alex Paul are just average."

=== Box office ===
The film was released on 5 July 2007, in 56 screens in Kerala. It had the biggest-ever opening day collection for a Malayalam film in 2007. Hallo was a blockbuster at the box office. It went on to become the second highest grossing movie of the year after Mayavi

=== Accolades ===
Dinesh won Kerala Film Critics Association Award for Best Choreographer.

== Remakes ==
The film was remade in Telugu as Naa Style Veru (2009) with Rajasekhar and in Kannada as Manjunatha BA LLB (2012) with Jaggesh.
