= Ankur Rathee =

Indian actor (born 1991)

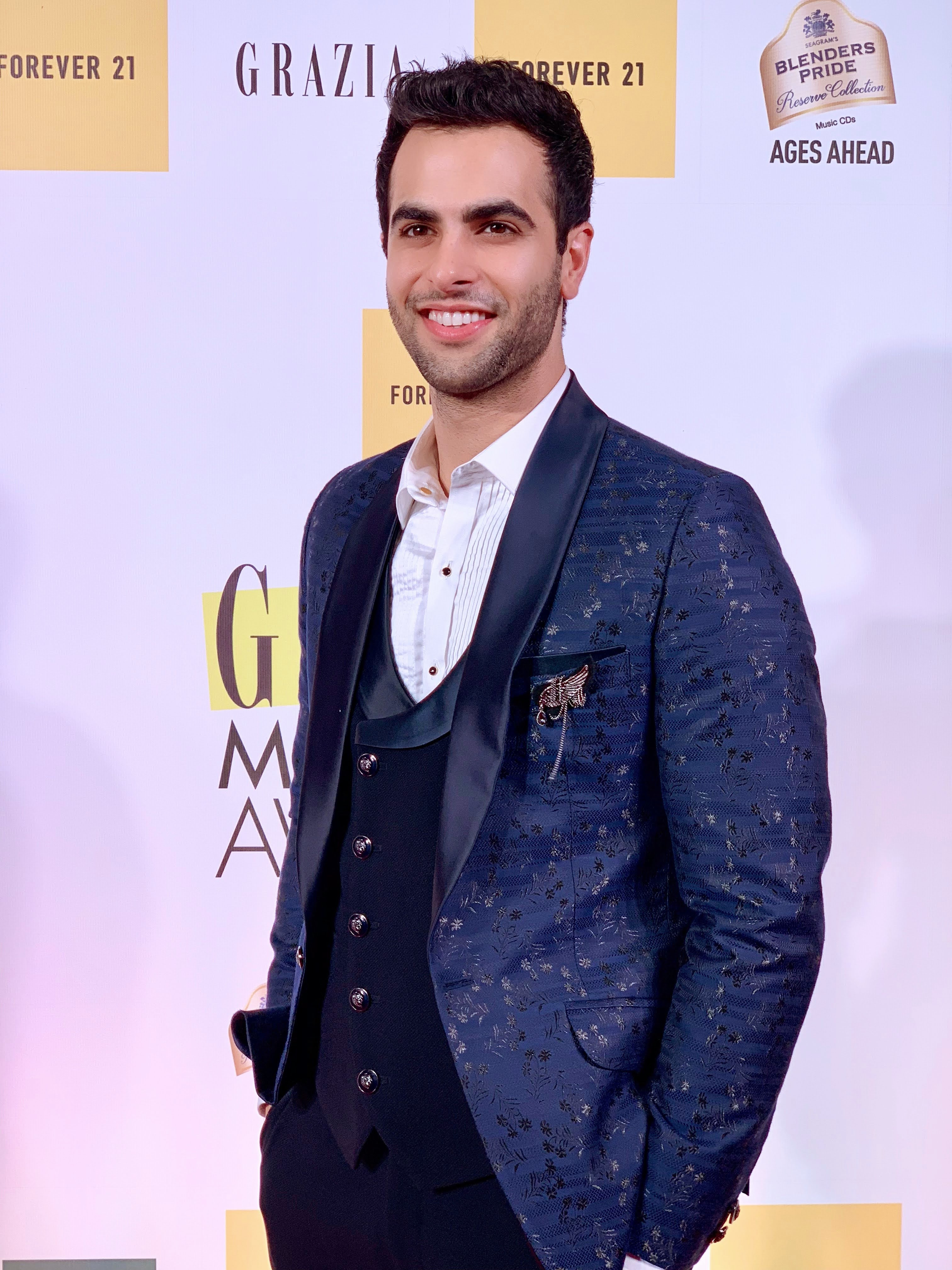
- Ankur Rathee at an event in 2020
- Born: 24 March 1991 (age 35); Hisar, Haryana, India
- Education: Princeton University
- Occupation: Actor
- Years active: 2012–present
- Spouse: Anuja Joshi (m. 2022)
- Relatives: Sonia Rathee (sister)

Ankur Rathee (born 24 March 1991) is an Indian actor. He is best known for his role in the Amazon Prime Video show Four More Shots Please (2019–2020).

== Early life ==
Ankur was born in Hisar, Haryana. He attended The Bishop's School, graduating cum laude in 2009. He graduated from Princeton University in 2014, where he studied anthropology and became involved in theater and performing arts.

== Career ==
As a student, Ankur was an active member of musical theater productions, a cappella groups, and dance companies, including Princeton Naacho Dance Company. He began his professional acting career in New York City with short films and off-Broadway theater. In 2018, he found his way back to the stage, alongside Ila Arun and K. K. Raina, as the lead in Tammy Ryan's, Baby's Blues which premiered at the National Centre for the Performing Arts. However, it was his portrayal of Arjun Nair, the young intern opposite Kirti Kulhari, in Four More Shots Please! that first garnered him notable recognition. That same year he played Arjun Mathur's gay love interest in another Amazon Prime series, Made in Heaven. Ankur made his feature film debut with veteran actor Naseeruddin Shah in The Tashkent Files. In 2020, he was back on the big screen again with Taapsee Pannu in Thappad and with Jim Sarbh in Taish. Ankur went on to book his first lead roles with the crime thriller series, Undekhi, and the Marathi film, Nirmal En Route. He also portrayed the role of Indian freedom fighter, Bhagat Singh, in the film Sarabha: Cry for Freedom.

== Personal life ==
Ankur is married to actress Anuja Joshi since 2022, daughter of former child artist, Master Alankar, and niece of Pallavi Joshi. In the middle of the COVID-19 pandemic, Ankur drove 4,500 kilometers cross-country to propose on 19 July 2020.

== Filmography ==
Key
†	Denotes films that have not yet been released

=== Films ===
Year	Title	Role
2019	The Tashkent Files	Imran Qureshi
2020	Thappad	Karan Sandhu
2020	Taish	Krish Kalra
2020	Sarabha: Cry For Freedom	Bhagat Singh
2022	Samaira	Jason
2023	Shehzada	Raj Nanda
2023	Babylicious	Nabee
2026	Best of the Best	Ronak

=== Web series ===
Year	Title	Role
2019–2020	Four More Shots Please!	Arjun Nair
2019	Made in Heaven	Sam
2019	Hello Mini	Abhiraj Mukherjee
2019	Mission Over Mars	Gautam Gulati
2020–2024	Undekhi	Daman
2021	City of Dreams	Arvind Mehka
2021	Inside Edge	Allen Manezes
2022	Eternally Confused and Eager for Love	Varun
2024	Reeta Sanyal	Jai Vardhan
2025	Single Papa	Goldie
