= Reema Worah =

Indian film and television actress

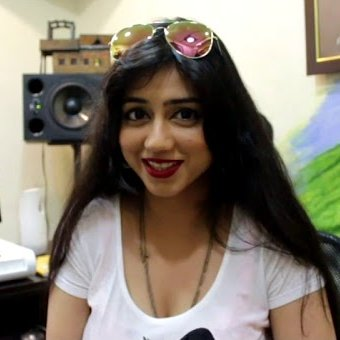
- Worah in 2018
- Born: Reema Worah; Indore, Madhya Pradesh, India
- Occupation: Actress
- Years active: 2000–2014; 2017–present

Reema Worah is an Indian actress who primarily work in Hindi television and Kannada films. Worah is known for playing Sanjana in Shaka Laka Boom Boom, Vaidehi Singh in Na Aana Is Des Laado, Gauhar Jaan in Bharat Ka Veer Putra – Maharana Pratap, Anjali Tiwari in Ek Duje Ke Vaaste 2, Dr. Aastha Brar in Dil Diyaan Gallaan and Ajanta Agarwal in Mehndi Wala Ghar. She has also played the lead in films such as Murali Meets Meera and Manjunatha BA LLB.

== Television ==
Year	Serial	Role
2000–2004	Shaka Laka Boom Boom	Sanjana
2006–2008	Ssshhhh...Koi Hai	
2008	Bhaago KK Aaya	
2008	Saath Saath Banayenge Ek Aashiyaan	Lajwanti "Lamita" Uday Singh
2009–2010	Na Aana Is Des Laado	Vaidehi Singh
2013	Do Dil Ek Jaan	
2014	Bharat Ka Veer Putra – Maharana Pratap	Gauhar Jaan
2014	Yam Kisi Se Kam Nahin	Jigna
2017	Crime Patrol	
2018	Mariam Khan - Reporting Live	
2018–2019	Vish Ya Amrit: Sitara	Yamini Arjun Singh
2020	Nazar 2	Hema Singh Chaudhary
2020	Ek Duje Ke Vaaste 2	Anjali Vijay Tiwari
2020	Kasautii Zindagii Kay	Priyanka
2021	Shaurya Aur Anokhi Ki Kahani	Kanchan Sabherwal
2022	Naagin 6	Radha Gujral
2022	Shubh Laabh - Aapkey Ghar Mein	Maya Toshniwal
2022–2023	Dil Diyaan Gallaan	Dr. Aastha Mandeep Brar
2024	Mehndi Wala Ghar	Ajanta Manoj Agarwal
2024	Mata Ki Mahima	Maa Sherawali
2025	Dhaakad Beera	Champa Chaudhary
2026–present	Lo Chudail Chali Sasural	Meenal Patel

== Films ==
Year	Film	Role	Language
2009	Chal Chalein	Sona	Hindi
2010	Shourya	Vidya	Kannada
2010	Gubbi	Ramya	Kannada
2011	Murali Meets Meera	Meera	Kannada
2012	Manjunatha BA LLB	Sneha	Kannada
