= Nirdosh =

2018 Indian film by Pradeep Rangwani and Subroto Paul

- Directed by: Pradeep Rangwani; Subroto Paul
- Story by: Amit Khan
- Produced by: Pradeep Rangwani
- Starring: Arbaaz Khan; Manjari Fadnis; Ashmit Patel; Mahek Chahal; Mukul Dev
- Cinematography: Arun Prasad
- Edited by: Sanjay Sankla
- Music by: Songs; Liyaqat Ajmeri; Harry Anand; Background Music; Sanjoy Chowdhury
- Production company: UV Films
- Release date: 19 January 2018
- Running time: 110 minutes
- Country: India
- Language: Hindi

Nirdosh (transl. Not Guilty) is a 2018 Indian Hindi-language thriller film directed by Pradeep Rangwani and Subroto Paul. It stars Arbaaz Khan, Manjari Fadnis, Ashmit Patel, Maheck Chahal and Mukul Dev. The film was released on 19 January 2018. Casting by Shaikh Sajid Ali

== Cast ==
- Arbaaz Khan as Inspector Lokhande
- Manjari Fadnis as Shanaya Grover
- Ashmit Patel as Gautam Grover
- Maheck Chahal as Adah
- Mukul Dev as Rana
- Salman Shaikh as Rakesh Tripathi
- Mohd Sharia

== Soundtracks ==
Nirdosh

Soundtrack album by Liyaqat Ajmeri & Harry Anand
- Genre: Feature film soundtrack
- Label: Zee Music Company

Tracklist
No.	Title	Lyrics	Music	Singer(s)	Length
1.	"Saiyan Re"	Shakeel Azmi	Liyaqat Ajmeri	Mohammed Irfan & Palak Muchhal	05:19
2.	"Barf Si"		Harry Anand	Armaan Malik	04:47
