= Manjunatha BA LLB =

Manjunatha B.A.., LLB.
- Film poster
- Directed by: Mohan Shankar
- Written by: Mohan Shankar
- Based on: Hallo (Malayalam)
- Produced by: A. Ganesh
- Starring: Jaggesh; Reema Vohra
- Cinematography: Ashok V. Raman
- Music by: Vinay Chandra
- Production company: Gowramma Productions
- Release date: 14 September 2012
- Country: India
- Language: Kannada

Manjunatha BA, LLB is a 2012 Indian Kannada-language comedy film written and directed by actor-turned-director Mohan Shankar. The film stars Jaggesh and Reema Vohra in the lead roles. The film is a remake of 2007 Malayalam film Hallo which itself was based on the 2004 movie Cellular.

== Plot ==
Jaggesh kills gangsters based on hallo and marriage takes place

== Cast ==
- Jaggesh as Adv. Manjunatha
- Tabla Nani as Basheer
- Reema Vohra as Sneha
- Karibasavaiah
- Srinivasa Murthy
- Girija Lokesh
- Chidanand
- Spoorthi Suresh as Prakruthi
- Swastik Shankar
- Shankar Patil

== Reception ==
=== Critical response ===
A critic from The Times of India scored the film at 2.5 out of 5 stars and says "Reema Vora is okay. Except for Srinivasamurthy, other artistes fail to impress. Music by Vinaya Chandra and cinematography by Ashok V Raman are average". Shruti I L from DNA wrote "Making one laugh comes naturally to Jaggesh and Naani, if only director Mohan had a more interesting, engaging and well executed script to do justice to the actors. Watch the film if you are a hard core Jaggesh fan who never gives any of his films a miss!". Srikanth Srinivasa from Rediff.com scored the film at 2.5 out of 5 stars and says "Reema Vohra has done justice to her role and so has Spoorthi as Manjunatha's first girlfriend. Chandrashekar of Yeddakallu Guddadamele makes a brief appearance as the heroine's father. Though there are too many characters, which leaves one confused, Manjunatha BA LLB is a watchable film". A Sharadhaa from The New Indian Express wrote "Ashok Raman has disappointed with his camera work and there is nothing much to talk about Vinay Chandra’s music. The Verdict: When the lawyer is incapable, the judgement is never in his favour". A critic from Bangalore Mirror wrote "Jaggesh saves bits of the film with his inimitable punchlines that are his trademark. A couple of songs are pleasing. But the background score, for the most part, is a torture. It manages to snuff out the dialogues even. The director shows lack of imagination and towards the end, the film seems to have been hurriedly wrapped up".
