= Sri Siddhartha Gautama (film) =

- official poster
- Directed by: Chandran Rutnam; Saman Weeraman
- Written by: Edwin Ariyadasa; Saman Weeraman; Navin Gunarathna; George Paldano
- Produced by: The Light of Asia foundation
- Starring: Gagan Malik; Prachi Jain; Ranjan Ramanayake; Gautam Gulati
- Edited by: Chandran Rutnam
- Distributed by: E.A.P. Films
- Release date: 24 January 2013
- Running time: 115 minutes
- Country: Sri Lanka
- Language: Sinhala

Sri Siddhartha Gautama (ශ්‍රී සිද්ධාර්ථ ගෞතම) is a 2013 Sinhalese biographical film based on the life of the Buddha, directed by Saman Weeraman and written by Edwin Ariyadasa, Saman Weersman, Navin Gunarathne and George Paldona.

The cast of Indian and Sri Lankan actors includes Gagan Malik, Anchal Singh, Ranjan Ramanayake, Anjani Perera, Roshan Ranawana, Gautam Gulati, Saranga Disasekara, Dilhani Ekanayake, and Wilson Gooneratne. Film maker Chandran Rutnam was the main adviser to the project. The film was released in Sri Lanka on 24 January 2013 on EAP theaters. The film has been dubbed into languages including Mandarin Chinese, Thai, Vietnamese and Hindi. It has also been subtitled in French, Japanese, Vietnamese, Mandarin and Hindi.

The film received five of the eight awards presented at 2014 UN Vesak Buddhist Film festival in Hanoi, Vietnam including the Best Featured film, Best Actor award, Best Director award, Best Editor award and Best Music award.

In 2023 its producers announced a second movie titled ‘Enlightened One – The Buddha’.

== Cast ==
- Gagan Malik as Prince Siddhartha (The Buddha)
- Anchal Singh as Princess Yasodhara
- Ranjan Ramanayake as King Suddhodana
- Jeewan Kumaranatunga as King Bimbisara
- Anshu Malik as Queen Maya
- Roshan Ranawana as Prince Nanda
- Gautam Gulati as Prince Devadatta
- Saranga Disasekara as Channa, Prince Siddhartha's favorite servant and classmate
- Wilson Gunarathne as Asita Thapasa
- Buddhadasa Vithanarachchi as Prince Siddhartha's Guru Vishma Mitra
- Douglas Ranasinghe as King Suppabuddha
- Dilhani Perera as Queen Pramitha
- Anjani Perera as Queen Prajapathi
- Suleman as Child Prince Siddhartha
- Ranjith Jayasinghe as Kondangngna
- Edwin Ariyadasa as Rama Thapasa
- Oshadhi Hewamadduma as Sujatha
- Dushyanth Weeraman as Prince Pasenadi
- Nalaka Daluwatte as Price Rohana
- Kelum Premasara as Uddaka Rāmaputta
