= Gagan Malik =

Indian television actor

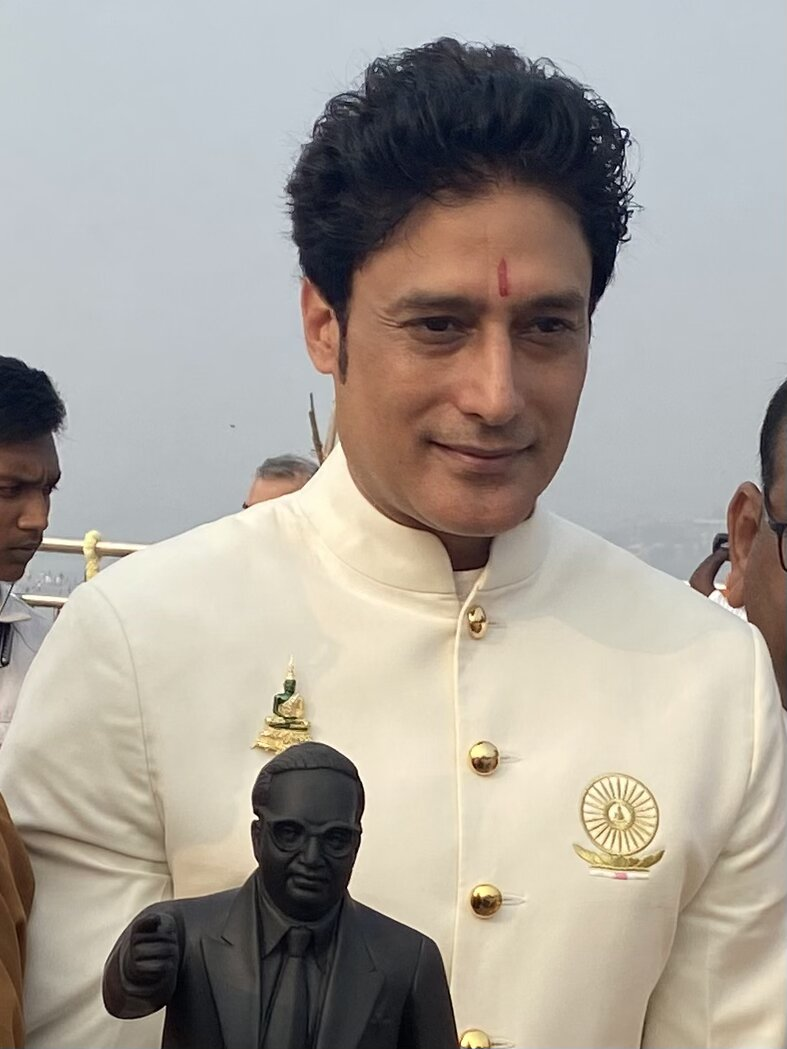
- Born: February 29, 1976 (50 years); New Delhi, Delhi, India
- Occupations: Actor, Model
- Years active: 2005–present

Gagan Malik is an Indian actor and Buddhist activist. He won the Best Actor Award in the World Buddhist Film Festival organised by the United Nations for his role as Siddhartha Gautama (The Buddha) in the Sri Lankan Sinhala film Sri Siddhartha Gautama. Malik is also known for his leading role as lord Rama in Ramayan.

== Early life and modelling career ==
Malik was born and brought up in a Hindu Jat family in New Delhi, Delhi, India. He has three elder brothers and a sister. He was educated in Hansraj school Central in New Delhi. In his childhood, his mother used to read the epic Ramayana to him. When he was young, he used to participate in his colony Ramleela and he have always played the character of Ram in it. Prior to his acting debut, Malik played first class cricket in India. He also played cricket for the Ranji Trophy team in New Delhi. After twelve years of cricket he moved to acting. Malik has vast experience in TV commercials (Times of India, Skoda, Birla Sun Life Insurance), music videos, modeling and designer shows. In 2004, he won Mr. Photogenic in national male beauty pageant Mr India.

== Career ==
In 2005, Malik landed a starring role in Hum Ladkiyan. It tells the story of the young engineer Siddharth, Indian-born engineer, raised and living in the U.S. arrives in Varanasi to work on the Ganga Cleaning Project. The show premiered in Tel Aviv, Israel on September 9, 2005.

He began his acting career in television with Kumkum on Star Plus and then he played a lead role in Zee TV's show Saath Saath Banayenge Ek Aashiyaan, he also appeared in Star One's, TV serial Shakuntala. In 2012, he played the lead role of Ram in Ramayan. The show was immensely popular in Indonesia and hence Malik, together with his co-stars Neha Sargam and Neil Bhatt, were invited to perform in a special stage show in Jakarta organised by antv.

In 2013, Malik debuted in international film with the Sri Lankan Sinhala language film "Sri Siddhartha Gautama" as the titular character. "Siddhartha Gauthama" film inspired by the spiritual odyssey of The Buddha has won international awards at the Delhi International Film Festival in India and the United Nations Buddhist Film Festival in Vietnam and broken box office records in Sri Lanka. He won the Best Actor Award in the 2014 World Buddhist Film Festival for his role in "Siddhartha Gauthama".

Malik is part of celebrity cricket team Jaipur Raj Joshiley for Indian sport-reality entertainment show Box Cricket League season 2. Currently he plays the role of Lord Rama in Sankatmochan Mahabali Hanuman in Sony TV.

In 2016, he confirmed that he is "strongly involved" in an international film based on the Buddha. It is reported will be the most expensive movie made on the Buddha. The pre production is on and the team will be shooting the teaser towards July or August.

== Personal life ==
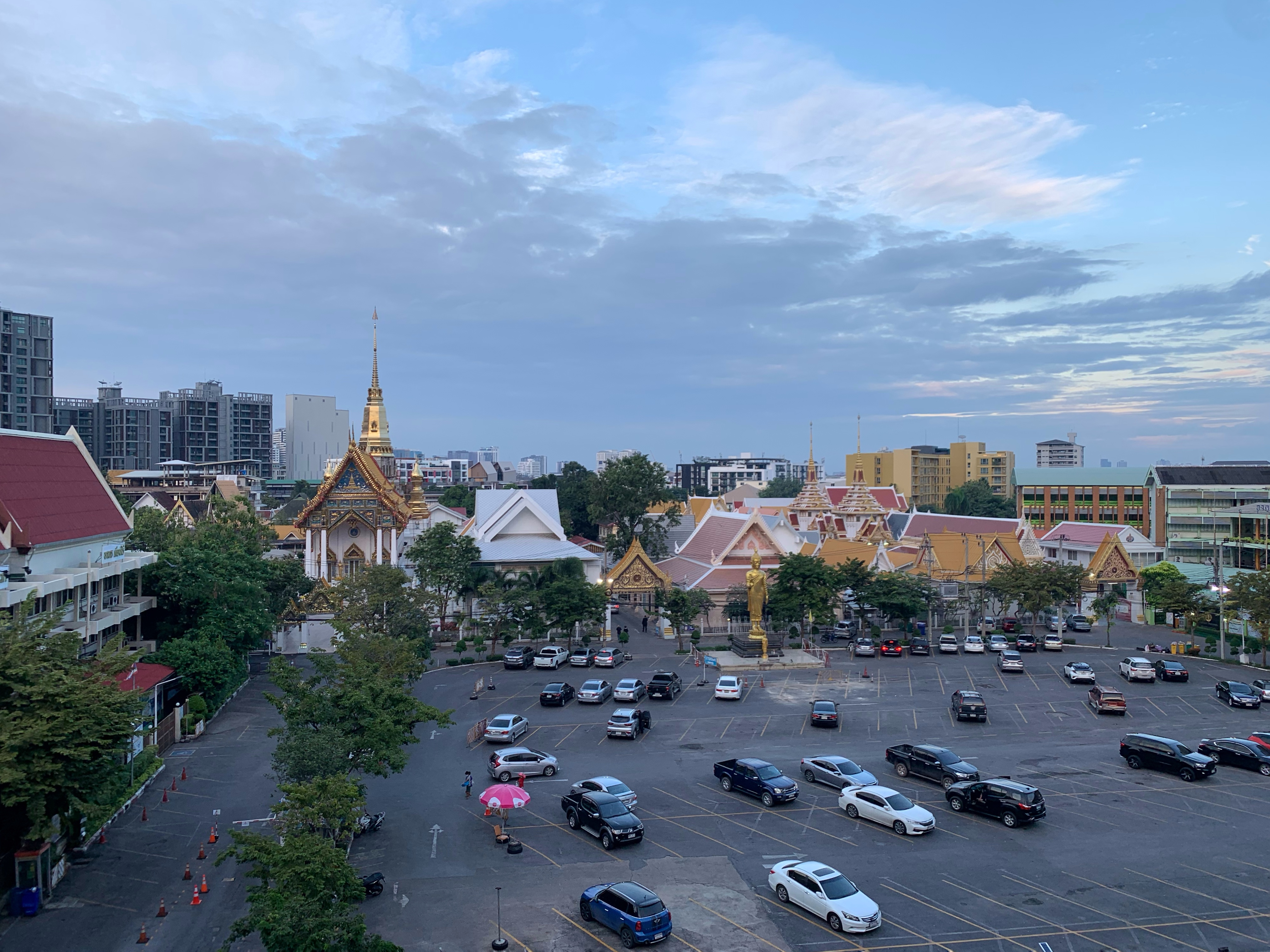
Wat That Thong Temple in Bangkok where Malik ordained into Bhikku in February 2022

Malik married when he was 22. His wife's name is Pooja and they live in Mumbai. Malik said, "I am married and have my Sita with me who is very supportive. Otherwise, I am all sorted and therefore don’t have to worry about any kind of controversies."

In 2014, Malik embraced Buddhism on Poson Poya day in Mihintale, Sri Lanka. On February 10, 2022, Malik ordained at Wat That Thong Temple in Bangkok, Thailand. His short-termed Bhikkhu will last for 15 days which he would take the opportunity to further study the teachings of Buddhism in Thailand. But he remained a Buddhist monk for 4 months (until June 2022), during which time he visited major Buddhist sites related to the life of the Buddha and Ambedkar.

On July 5, 2025, Malik had a meeting with a Vietnamese monk who practices the 13 austere ascetic practices at Bodh Gaya. That Vietnamese monk was Venerable Thich Minh Tue. It was a meeting between the man who portrayed the Buddha in a film and the one who truly follows the Buddha's teachings nearly 2,600 years later.

== Filmography ==
=== Film ===
Year	Film	Role	language	Note
2013	Sri Siddhartha Gautama	Siddhartha Gautama (The Buddha)	Sinhalese	

=== Television ===
Year	Serial	Role	Channel
2005	Kaisa Ye Pyar Hai	Manan	Sony Entertainment Television
2007–2008	Kumkum – Ek Pyara Sa Bandhan	Sharman Wadhwa	Star Plus
2008	Saath Saath Banayenge Ek Aashiyaan	Uday Singh	Zee TV
2009	Shakuntala	Veer	Star One
2011	Rishton Se Badi Pratha	Cameo	Colors TV
2012	Upanishad Ganga	Dnyaneshwar, Tansen, Varaha Mihir and various other roles	DD National
2011-2012	Navya	Navya's Boss (Extended Cameo)	Star Plus
2012-2013	Ramayan	Rama	Zee TV
2015–2017	Sankatmochan Mahabali Hanuman	Krishna, Rama, Vishnu	Sony TV
2016	Box Cricket League	Himself	Colors TV
2017	Tu Sooraj, Main Saanjh Piyaji	Bal Brahmachari	Star Plus
2020	Vighnaharta Ganesha	Sudama / Shankhachuda	Sony TV
2023	Tulsidham Ke Laddu Gopal	Krishna	Shemaroo TV
2024	Aadi Shankaracharya (TV series)	Samrat Ashok	Art of Living App

=== Theater ===
- 2005 Bharati as Siddharth (lead role)

=== Music videos appearances ===
- Chalte Chalte remix - Music Today
- Ang Lag Ja Balam Universal

== Charity ==
In 2013, Malik, together with Navin Gooneratne who produced "Sri Siddharta Gautama" film, launched the "Lotus World" project based on the fundamentals of Buddhism by The Light of Asia Foundation, a non-profit organization based in Sri Lanka focused on the advancement of Buddhism throughout the world through audio visual media, to invite likeminded people around the world to the "Lotus Family" to serve humanity. The idea is to form a Family of Members of like thinking based on the Noble Eightfold Path. Three basic principles have been identified. The first is Goodness – cultivating purity of self through Right Speech, Right Action and Right Livelihood. The second is Friendship – extending the hand of friendship to all who wish to be in the Family of Members and the community at large. The third is Mindfulness – elevating self-awareness through the practice of Mindfulness Meditation resulting in greater clarity and peace of mind .

Malik considers Emperor Ashoka, who spread the Buddhism in the world, and Dr. Babasaheb Ambedkar, who revived the Buddhism in India, as his role models. He says that the greeting Namo Buddhay (trans: salutations to the Buddha) is never complete without Jai Bhim (trans: salutations to Ambedkar). He stressed that playing the role of Sri Siddharta Gautama had entirely changed his life and his attitude, which is how Lotus World was born. The satisfaction of "doing something for another person" is what has encouraged actor Gagan Malik to give-up the glamorous life style of a film star. As the founder of this project, Malik hopes that children would learn the joy of serving others, books to record their good deeds as a part of the Lotus World's "One good deed a day project" were presented at the launch.
