= Aadi Shankaracharya (TV series) =

Indian Hindi-language web-series

- Official poster
- Written by: Onkar Nath Mishra
- Directed by: Onkar Nath Mishra
- Starring: Arnav Kahnijo; Sandeep Mohan; Gagan Malik; Yogesh Mahajan; Arun Shekhar
- Music by: Suryakamal; Bapi Bhattacharya
- Country of origin: India
- Original language: Hindi
- No. of episodes: 10

Production
- Producers: Nakul Dhawan; Onkar Nath Mishra
- Cinematography: S. Sameer
- Editor: Umma Mishrra
- Production companies: The Art of Living; Sri Sri Publications Trust; ONM Multimedia

Original release
- Release: 1 November 2024

Aadi Shankaracharya is an Indian socio-historical web series that marks the first depiction of the life and legacy of Aadi Shankaracharya, one of India's spiritual and cultural icons.

== Plot ==
The series focuses on the early life of Aadi Shankaracharya, his spiritual journey, and how he helped to unite India, which was split into over 300 states and 72 religious groups. His teachings of oneness played a key role in bringing harmony and reshaping India's spiritual and political landscape.

== Cast ==
- Arnav Khanijo as Shri Shankar (Young Aadi Shankaracharya)
- Gagan Malik as Samrat Ashoka
- Amardeep Garg as Mahamuni
- Sandeep Mohan as Acharya Shivguru
- Suman Gupta as Devi Aryamba
- Yogesh Mahajan as Acharya Dharmdhwaj
- Ashish Jha as Acharya Rishabh
- Pratyaksh Bhatnagar Saxena as Shri Shankar (3 years)
- Vinay Pandey as Bhagwan Parashuram
- Rajiv Ranjan as Acharya Vibhuti
- Arun Shekhar as Devdatt

== Production ==
Aadi Shankaracharya is produced under the banner of the Sri Sri Publications Trust and ONM Multimedia, presented by the Art of Living. The web series is directed and written by Onkar Nath Mishra. The series has been shot at various locations across India, including Mumbai and Bengaluru.
