= Yam Kisi Se Kam Nahin =

Indian Television Comedy Series

- Starring: Rajesh Kumar; Reema Vohra
- Opening theme: Yam Kisi Se Kam Nahin
- No. of seasons: 1
- No. of episodes: 40

Production
- Producers: David Polycarps; Vasant Valsan
- Running time: 22 minutes
- Production companies: Trouble Maker Productions; The Company

Original release
- Network: Epic TV
- Release: 2014

Yam Kisi Se Kam Nahin (Yam is not less than anyone') is a television comedy show on the Indian channel EPIC. It is based on the fictional marital daily life of Hindu god Yamraj. It features Rajesh Kumar as Yamraj and Reema Vohra as his chirpy Gujrati wife Jigna.

The show aired on Ishara TV during COVID-19 pandemic lockdown in 2021 when TV serial shootings were stopped in Maharashtra and Ishara TV did not have bank episodes for serials.

== Episodes ==
No.	Title
1	"Don"
Yamraj makes repeated attempts to take the praan of a certain deadly Don only to be interrupted constantly by Jigna to run some household errand or the other. Meanwhile, the Don keeps doubling his protection thinking his rival gang in the city has hired an assassin to kill the Don. Simultaneously, in drama class in school, Himesh and Satya are battling out to play the titular role of Vishwamitra, so as to get closer to the girl of both their dreams, Mohini, who's playing the role of Menaka, female lead in the play.
2	"Will"
While going about his daily routine of taking praans, Yamraj comes across an extremely rich man, who is thoroughly confused about which of sons' should be the heir to his enormous fortune. The old man entrusts the responsibility of finding the most deserving heir to Yamraj, in exchange for half his wealth. Poor Yamraj, having always dreamt of amassing great wealth, grabs the opportunity immediately. Meanwhile, Jigna, on hearing news of the immense wealth that'll soon be theirs, immediately starts planning the biggest party of the neighborhood, inviting everyone from the milkman to landlord.
3	"Broken Leg"
When Yamraj, tries to take the praan of an ailing man in the hospital, the man surprises him by being remarkably agile and pushes him out the window. This in turn leads to Yamraj being forcibly hospitalized and placed in the bed right next to the old man whose praan he is meant to take. While Yamraj struggles to get out of his forced hiatus, a friendly yet slightly competitive game of chausar between Himesh and Satya, turns into an ugly ego battle between Jigna and Mandira.
4	"Jewellery Shop"
Deeply affected by the harsh words spoken by a politician who proclaimed to his audience that Yamraj – The Lord of Death - is a symbol of evil; Yamraj decides to ask his boss – Akaashwani for a job that commands more respect from the mortals. When Akaashwani dismisses his pleas, Yamraj takes the extremely bold step of quitting his job to work for his reluctant father-in-law. While he is trying to make himself useful in his father-in-law's jewellery shop, Himesh tries to enjoy some quality time with Mohini at his home, only to have it disrupted, time and time, by Satya.
5	"Faking Pregnancy (Part 1)"
Tired of living a life with no luxury, owing to the modest means earned by Yamraj, Jigna lies to her mother about being pregnant in order to claim the crores her father has kept aside for his first grandchild. What Jigna did not foresee however, is her mother showing up to tend to her in her 'pregnancy', right when she's prepping for a dance competition in which she fully intends to beat three-time champion Mandira.
6	"Faking Pregnancy (Part 2)"
Tired of living a life with no luxury, owing to the modest means earned by Yamraj, Jigna lies to her mother about being pregnant in order to claim the crores her father has kept aside for his first grandchild. What Jigna did not foresee however, is her mother showing up to tend to her in her 'pregnancy', right when she's prepping for a dance competition in which she fully intends to beat three-time champion Mandira.
7	"Jyotish Baba"
When Yamraj casually takes the praan of an astrologer, the astrologer's last words to him are that he will suffer bodily, mental and monetary harm. While Yamraj does not believe him at first, the events of his rather unfortunate life force him to acquiesce that the astrologer might be right. In the hope that further damage can be avoided, Yam and Doot set out to bring back the astrologer from the underworld.
8	"Holiday Package (Part 1)"
When Jigna sees Mandira and Guptaji return from a thoroughly enjoyable holiday, she immediately demands that Yam take her on a Holiday. Yam of course denies the possibility of taking a vacation. As luck would have it, a letter is delivered to Jigna conveying that the couple has won a holiday package in lucky draw. Thrilled, she immediately starts planning for the trip. Yam however is not so sure. The trip is on-again-off-again like swaying blade of grass, and with every sway, this way or that, Himesh alters his plans to either have a candle light dinner for two with Mohini or go for a class picnic. What finally comes to be of this madness, is an outcome none could have imagined.
9	"Holiday Package (Part 2)"
When Jigna sees Mandira and Guptaji return from a thoroughly enjoyable holiday, she immediately demands that Yam take her on a Holiday. Yam of course denies the possibility of taking a vacation. As luck would have it, a letter is delivered to Jigna conveying that the couple has won a holiday package in lucky draw. Thrilled, she immediately starts planning for the trip. Yam however is not so sure. The trip is on-again-off-again like swaying blade of grass, and with every sway, this way or that, Himesh alters his plans to either have a candle light dinner for two with Mohini or go for a class picnic. What finally comes to be of this madness, is an outcome none could have imagined.
10	"Microwave (Part 1)"
Surprised at all the goodies that Yam is bestowing upon Jigna, Mandira convinces her that this must mean that he is having an affair. The motivation for bringing home all these gifts could only be guilt. Jigna is horrified. She follows Yam to find out what is going on. Once she does find out, she becomes his partner-in-crime. Guptaji, in the meantime, is still trying to get to the bottom of Yam's newly acquired riches. He follows Yam and Jigna and discovers the truth as well, promptly complaining to Akashwaani.
11	"Microwave (Part 2)"
Surprised at all the goodies that Yam is bestowing upon Jigna, Mandira convinces her that this must mean that he is having an affair. The motivation for bringing home all these gifts could only be guilt. Jigna is horrified. She follows Yam to find out what is going on. Once she does find out, she becomes his partner-in-crime. Guptaji, in the meantime, is still trying to get to the bottom of Yam's newly acquired riches. He follows Yam and Jigna and discovers the truth as well, promptly complaining to Akashwaani.
12	"Baai (Maid)"
Jigna is unwell and so Yam hires a baai to do the housework. As things start disappearing from the house, Yam puts Doot on the job to spy on the baai. Doot promptly falls in love with her, and is left tied to a piller while the baai cleans up. Himesh, in order to help Mohini and himself, steals a question paper from the Principal's office, leading to disastrous results.
13	"Electricity"
Yam goes on a 'Bijli Bachao Andolan' to reduce his electricity bill which has suddenly doubled. It is Diwali time and Jigna has decked up the house with electric lights. Jigna, Himesh and his visiting in-laws, Himen and Jyotiben, bear the brunt of his andolan until Yam discovers that his electric line has been tapped and someone is stealing power from him.
14	"Beauty Parlour"
Jigna is profoundly upset when learns from Mandira that Guptaji gives her pocket money in exchange for all the work she does around the house. Seething, she demands the same from Yamraj, who laughs it off, as a result of which, Jigna now charges him for every little thing she does. Undeterred Yamraj tries to prove that he can manage without her help. In the midst of all this drama, Himesh inspired by a film he sees on television, decides to anonymously blackmail friends and family to make a quick buck.
15	"Water Problem"
Yam brings home a water tank as the water supply in Yamlok is very erratic. In order to save money, he deputes Doot to connect up the tank (content missing I guess) with disastrous results. Having no water in the house, Yam gets a plumber to divert some of Guptaji's water to his house. Himesh, in the meantime, discovers that his brother-in-law is quite a celebrity amongst some people. He devises a novel way to make money, charging Yam's fans money and bringing them over to meet him.
16	"Dolly (Jigna's friend at home)"
Yam moves his beloved Bhainsa to the bedroom as he is sick with a cold. An angry Jigna starts to leave the house to go back to her parents' place on Dhartilok when her old school friend, Dolly, pays her a surprise visit. Jigna stays back, pretending to have an amazingly happy marriage with Yam. Dolly however, having discovered that Jigna is sleeping on the living room couch and overhearing Yam speak lovingly to his bhainsa from outside the bedroom door, believes that Yam is having an open affair. Himesh, in the meantime, crashes Mandira's new car while pretending to know how to drive to impress Mohini. He hides the car in the bhainsa's empty stall with Doot's help while pretending that the car was stolen, but is soon caught. Meanwhile Dolly enters Yam's bedroom to find the truth, discovers the bhainsa and falls out of the window, further damaging the already stricken car.
17	"Unwelcome Guest"
Mandira has a fight with Guptaji and moves in with a suitcase to stay with Jigna. Guptaji soon follows with a suitcase as well. Himesh and Satya begin to steal and sell various goods from Guptaji's now empty house. They rope in Doot to help as well. In the meantime, Yam discovers that Guptaji and Mandira are very tiresome house guests. Secretly, Guptaji and Mandira are only pretending to fight in order to have free boarding and lodging at Yam's. When Yam buys a new TV and it turns out to be Guptaji's, chaos erupts.
18	"Lagaa Saree Mein Daag"
Jigna is horrified to find a large stain in a sari she borrowed from Mandira. Yam decides to remove the stain himself with Doot's help, making it worse with each attempt. Himesh tries to trick Satya into going to a so-called haunted spot, having convinced Mohini to pretend to be a ghost and scare him when he gets there. The ghost turns out to be genuine. In the meantime, Yam manages to buy an identical sari to return to Mandira, who is surprised to find the stain missing as she was aware of its existence even before she lent it to Jigna.
19	"Job Exchange"
Yam and Jigna get into an argument about who has the tougher job. They decide to exchange roles for a day. Yam stays back to manage the house, while Jigna goes out to take Yam's quota of praans. Himen and Jyotiben come over to visit, making Yam's job a nightmare. In the meantime, Jigna has her fair share of adventures.
20	"Himesh Kidnapping"
Yam is annoyed because Jigna always includes Himesh in all their family outings. He asks Doot to get Himesh out of his hair for a bit so he may spend some time with Jigna sans Himesh. In the meantime, Himesh pretends to be kidnapped in order to extract Rs. 500/- from Yam to buy a video game. Thinking that this is Doot at work, Yam tells off the so-called kidnappers. Jigna calls her parents for support. Realising an opportunity to extract some money from Himen, Yam pretends the kidnappers have asked for Rs. 50,000/- Giving this money to a confused Doot to put into his bank, Yam collects Himesh, who has just returned disappointed that his plan didn't work, and brings him home. When Himesh realises what has happened, he blackmails Yam to give him fifty percent of the money. In the midst of a now happy family, Doot enters with the Rs. 50,000/- saying that the bank is closed, inadvertently revealing Yam's duplicity to all.
21	"Sasur Damad Special"
Sick and tired of his father-in-law's taunts and insults, Yam decides to take matters into his own hands by letting Himen think that he has no time left to live. Faced with reality of certain death, Himen is put in Yam's hands, and Yam takes advantage to fullest. What Yam doesn't realise however is how dearly he will have to pay for this prank. Meanwhile, Doot seems to have fallen in love again and the object of his current affection is Jigna's new Yoga instructor. Feeling rather at sea about how to charm this young woman, Doot makes the mistake of taking advice from the self-proclaimed Love guru – Himesh and what finally happens between Doot and the Yoga instructor is no surprise at all.
22	"Dance Class"
Yam overhears a conversation where Jigna turns down going to a club in Yamlok because Yam simply cannot dance. Hurt by the fact that his lack of skill is causing Jigna to forego something she would otherwise enjoy, he decides to enroll for dance classes and master the skill for the sake of his loving wife's happiness. Little does he know that he will come to enjoy dancing so much; it will take over his entire existence. On the other hand, Himesh has gotten himself into yet another fix. Jealous about Satya and Mohini constantly texting each other, he took away Mohini's phone to have some fun with Satya while pretending to be Mohini. However, while trying to hide from Yam, he drops it on the floor in the cow shed and consequently, it is swallowed whole by Yam's faithful bhains. The rest of episode sees Himesh and Doot trying everything possible to get the phone out of Bhains.
23	"Noisy Neighborhood"
When Yam refuses to take Jigna to Dhartilok for a movie, she looks to Mandira for company. Happily entrusting the responsibility of her father-in-law to Doot, the ladies gleefully head off to the movies. Doot however, has a rather difficult handling Mandira's father-in-law. At home, Yam is overjoyed at being able to enjoy a day of peace and quiet, only to be rudely disturbed by Satya and Himesh, who have been bribed by Guptaji to stay away from his home, so HE can enjoy a day of peace and quiet. Yam immediately doubles the bribe and sends them back to Guptaji's and from then.
24	"Rat in the House"
There's a rat in the home of great Yamraj. And much to everyone's dismay, Yam has decided to take care of the rodent issue himself. Moving from one ridiculous solution to next, Yam along with his begrudging aide, Doot, take matters from bad to worse, causing Jigna to walk out of the house. But when the root cause for the rat being in the house is revealed, all of their collective fury is targeted at someone completely unexpected.
25	"Soul Swap"
While Himesh and Yam are in the midst of another lengthy and exhausting fight, a mystical and unexplained forced swaps their souls so Himesh is in Yam's body and vice versa. What follows is Himesh taking full advantage of being a position of power while Yamraj, while bearing the brunt of it, is trying desperately to minimize the damage. Meanwhile Doot engages in another romantic tryst, this time in pursuit of cutiepie77, an online acquaintance.
26	"A Necklace Affair"
Jigna finds an expensive necklace set hidden amongst Yam's clothes and assumes that it is a gift for her. She tries various tricks to get Yam to reveal the supposed surprise, but he is clueless. Meanwhile, one of the famous priests of heaven, Ramsay ji, visits the school to give the students a motivational speech. Angry at Himesh for disrupting the class and making fun of him, the priest curses him and turns him into a rooster. Later on, Mandira drops by looking for Yam and seeing her wearing the necklace, Jigna is both shocked and upset.
27	"Tota (Pet-Parrot)"
When Jigna pressures Yam into getting her a pet, he picks a parrot that becomes a household favourite in no time. Soft-spoken, polite, virtuous and kind, the parrot is also proficient at giving apt and extremely helpful advice. Looking to capitalize on this trait, Himesh and Satya set up an astrology stand to make a quick buck. What follows is a series of hits and misses (mostly misses) where Himesh and Satya try to undo the damage they have done, but instead make matters worse.
28	"Diamond Potty"
Yam, upset that he cannot fulfill Jigna's birthday wish for a diamond necklace, makes a plan with Doot. He will take a diamond necklace from one of his victims in exchange for letting her live a few more days, gift the necklace to Jigna, making her happy, and then fake steal the necklace to give it back without her knowledge. However, a real thief, a buffalo that's all too ready to gobble down diamonds and greedy Himesh-Himen combo who will do anything for diamonds all complicate the situation.
29	"Amnesia"
Yam gets knocked on the head with a cricket ball while taking the praan of an unmarried lady, Pinky, who's been desperate to get married. Realising that Yam now has amnesia, and believing him to be the husband that a pundit had promised, she lets him believe that they're engaged to be married. Seeing them shopping for jewellery in Himen's shop, Himen thinks that Yam is having an affair. After a confrontation with him, Jigna and Himesh realise that Yam has lost his memory. Himesh suggests another whack on his head could give him his memory back. In the meantime, Pinky hurriedly gets the pundit to marry them, but Yam gets hit on the head by a cricket ball once more and regains his memory. Jigna and Himesh arrive, not realising this, and as per plan, Himesh whacks Yam on the head.
30	"Anniversary (Doot Flashback)"
Jigna decides to plan something special for her and Yam's wedding anniversary. Doot is saddened remembering the past events. In flashback, it is shown that exactly a year ago, Yam paid Doot a visit to collect his soul on the same day that the latter got a promotion and married. It turned out to be a huge mistake as Yam "killed" the wrong man (Atmanand Diwedi/Doot instead of Atmanand Trivedi). To repent for the mistake, Yam gives Atmanand a job in heaven - that of Yamdoot. Yam then assigns Doot to help out Jigna whenever she needs a hand at home. Doot still holds a grudge against Yam, and in present is shown plotting against him to get revenge.
31	"Badtameez Dil (Heart Attack!)"
While taking the praan of a teaching doctor in a medical college, Yam hears about the symptoms of a heart attack and realises that he's going through the same symptoms. A vaid examines him and pronounces that it is indeed a heart attack. Himesh, in school, impresses a school inspector with his honesty, much to the annoyance of the principal. Returning home and finding Yam on his deathbed, Himesh recognizes his symptoms for what they are... gas.
32	"Them Clones (Part 1)"
An overwhelmed Yam does not have time for Jigna, which infuriates her. Later, Yam goes to take praan of the scientists who's just cloned an animal. Yam spares his life in return for a clone of himself. Using the clone to do all his work, Yam finds a lot of time for Jigna and himself. Himesh discovers the truth and demands a clone for himself in return for his silence. Son the clones rebel and move into the house forcing Yam and Himesh out. Discovering that clones are now in love with Jigna and Mohini, Yam and Himesh comes up with a novel plan to solve their problems.
33	"Return of the Clones (Part 2)"
An overwhelmed Yam does not have time for Jigna, which infuriates her. Later, Yam goes to take praan of the scientists who's just cloned an animal. Yam spares his life in return for a clone of himself. Using the clone to do all his work, Yam finds a lot of time for Jigna and himself. Himesh discovers the truth and demands a clone for himself in return for his silence. Son the clones rebel and move into the house forcing Yam and Himesh out. Discovering that clones are now in love with Jigna and Mohini, Yam and Himesh comes up with a novel plan to solve their problems.
34	"Naya Mehmaan"
Himen and Jyotiben's dog has puppies and Jyotiben promises one to Jigna. Jigna keeps the fact secret from Yam, who's a bit scared of dogs. Mandira inadvertently talks to Yam misunderstands and excitedly believes that Jigna is about to have a baby. He goes on a rampage buying things for his "Naya Mehmaan" much to Jigna's confusion.
35	"Moonch"
Yam goes to take the praan of the director of a play, who offers Yam a role in his play..... if he shaves his moustaches. Yam does and returns home with a small moustache and a script. Jigna believes that Yam is actually Kamdev in disguise and gets Doot, Himesh and Mandira's help to overpower him. Yam finds himself tied to a chair, and has a hard time convincing everyone that he is indeed Yam. Later, the family go to see Yam acting in his play, but Yam suffers from stage fright.
36	"Matrimonial"
Yam is expecting officials to come and check on him as his job appraisals are going on. In the meantime, Doot has registered in a matchmaking website. Himesh changes Doot's profile to Yam's. A family comes to see Yam for their daughter but is mistaken by Yam and Jigna as officials from Antakshari's office, leading to se hilarious moments.
37	"Mango Loosie"
Yam decides to fast along with Jigna during Karwachauth. He is gifted a crate of mangoes, of which he is extremely fond. Watching Himesh eating the mangoes proves too much for Yam, and he secretly devours them all, developing loose motioon. Doot, in the meantime, tries to take up a teaching job in Himesh's school but the job turns out to be that of a security guard. Yam, even with loose motion, goes to inaugurate a juice centre and is forced to drink a lot of mango juice, resulting in the inevitable.
38	"Pyaar Ka Nishanaa"
Yam asks his friend Kamdev for help in his marriage after a big fight with Jigna. Kamdev tries to shoot her with his love arrow but shoots Mandira instead, who falls madly in love with Yam. Thinking that shooting Yam with an arrow now and making him fall in love with Mandira will solve the problem, Kamdev fires, but strikes Himen, who's now besotted with Mandira. This goes on till there is a chain of people, each in love with the next; Mandira with Yam, Himen with Mandira, Guptaji with Himen and the bhains with Guptaji.
39	"Theme Party(Part 1)"
Yam and Jigna are invited to a party in Himen's house. Jigna convinces Yam to wear a suit. However, it is a mythological theme party and Yam sticks out like a sore thumb. What makes it worse is the presence of a guest who has come dressed as Yamraj. In the meantime, Himesh attempts to make homemade pizza at home for Mohini using the washing machine and succeeds in messing up the house quite badly.
40	"Theme Party(Part 2)"
Yam and Jigna are invited to a party in Himen's house. Jigna convinces Yam to wear a suit. However, it is a mythological theme party and Yam sticks out like a sore thumb. What makes it worse is the presence of a guest who has come dressed as Yamraj. In the meantime, Himesh attempts to make homemade pizza at home for Mohini using the washing machine and succeeds in messing up the house quite badly.

== Cast ==
- Rajesh Kumar as Lord Yamraj. He is miser due to low earnings and hence is not well treated by Jigna and her parents. He tries to give best treatment to his family but all plans go into vain due his brother-in-law Himesh which usually causes troubles and losses.
- Reema Worah as Jigna, Yamraj's wife, Himen and Jyotiben's daughter, Himesh's sister. She is a Gujarati woman from Earth. She is jealous of her neighbour Mandira and wants all facilities and luxuries of life. Her parents frequently visit her and curse Yamraj for her discomfort.
- Alam Khan as Himesh, Himen and Jyotiben's son, Jigna's younger brother. He causes troubles for which Jigna blames Yamraj.
- Deepak Pareek as Lord Chitragupt, Mandira's husband and Satya's father. He is wealthy and Yamraj's neighbour.
- Eva Ahuja as Mandira Gupta, Chitragutp's wife, Satya's mother. She always wears heavy jewelry to make Jigna jealous. She also tries to create misunderstanding between Yamraaj and Jigna for her pass-time.
- Ahsaas Channa as Mohini, Himesh and Satya's friend. Both Satya and Himesh have secret crush on her. Despite this, she doesn't give them much needed attention.
- Abhishek Pattnaik as Atmanand Diwedi (Doot). He was mistakenly killed by Yamraj on his marriage and promotion day and hence has secret grudges against him. He was appointed as Yamdut, Yamraj's emissary assistant as compensation for his death. He is overqualified assistant from IIT and IIM. Though being overqualified, he is being exploited by Yam and his family.
- Ayush Narang as Satya, Mandira and Chitragutp's son, Mohini and Himesh's friend. He secretly has a crush on Mohini and often considers Himesh as his rival.
- Parthaa Akerkar as Himen Bhai, Jigna's Father and Jyotiben's Husband. He is wealthy and Owns a Jewelry Shop.
- Sheela Sharma as Jyotiben, Himen's wife, Jigna and Himesh's mother. She always taunts Yamraj for Jigna's discomfort which is usually caused by Himesh.
- Shaynam Ladakhi as Bahadur. Yamlok's security watchman.(Episode- Unwelcome Guest)
- Beenna Malje as Pinky. Yamraj's fake wife.(Episode-Amnesia)

== Production ==
=== Digital Availability ===
The entire show is available on Ishara Channel YouTube channel and aired during May and June 2021.
