= Apharan (TV series) =

2018 Hindi-language TV series

- Created by: Sidharth Sengupta
- Developed by: Ekta Kapoor
- Written by: Mohinder Pratap Singh; Dialogues; Varun Badola
- Directed by: Sidharth Sengupta
- Creative directors: Baljit Singh Chaddha; Snehil Dixit Mehra
- Starring: see below
- Country of origin: India
- Original language: Hindi
- No. of seasons: 2
- No. of episodes: 23

Production
- Producers: Siddharth Sen Gupta; Jyoti Sagar
- Production locations: Mumbai, India
- Editors: Jaskaran; Imran
- Camera setup: Multi-camera
- Running time: 18-27 minutes
- Production company: EDGESTORM Productions

Original release
- Network: ALT Balaji (season 1); Voot (season 2)
- Release: 14 December 2018 - 18 March 2022

Apharan is a 2018 Indian Hindi-language crime thriller streaming television series directed and co-produced by Sidharth Sengupta for video on demand platform ALTBalaji. Starring Arunoday Singh, the series is set in current times and revolves around kidnapping, suspense, mystery and action.

The series has been available for streaming on the ALT Balaji App and its associated websites since its release date. Season 2 was released on 18 March 2022.

== Plot ==
Rudra Srivastava (Arunoday Singh), a senior inspector of Uttarakhand Police is lured into kidnapping a young girl named Anusha (Monica Chaudhary), at the request of her step-mother (Mahie Gill). The plot begins as a simple plan to extort money in exchange for Anusha but she is murdered. He was falsely accused and ends up in jail for 3 years.

Season 2 revolves around Rudra navigating his professional duties with his personal life at stake. To find a cure for his wife's addiction, RAW sends the formidable cop to Serbia to track down and capture Vikram Bahadur Singh, or VBS, a wanted criminal responsible for the death of 9 Indian RAW agents in one month.

== Season Overview ==
S.No.	Title	Release date	Episodes
1	Apharan - Sabka Katega	14 December 2018	12
2	Apharan - Sabka Katega Dobara	18 March 2022	11

== Cast ==
- Arunoday Singh

as Rudra Srivastava/ Vikram Bahadur Shah (VBS) (Dual Roles in season 2)

- Mahie Gill as Madhu Tyagi / Malini
- Nayani Dixit as Rudra's fake wife
- Ujjawal Chopra as Bhandari (Season 2)
- Monica Chaudhary as Anusha Tyagi (Season 1)
- Nidhi Singh as Ranjana Srivastava
- Varun Badola as Laxman Saxena
- Saanand Verma as Satyanarayan Dubey
- Neha Kaul as Madhu Tyagi
- Pawan Chopra as Commissioner
- Ram Sujan Singh as Mishra
- Surender Singh as Constable Joshi
- Sanjay Batra as Govind Tyagi
- Nilesh Mamgain as Shukla
- Snehil Dixit Mehra as Sadhu's Wife
- Shweta Rajput as Ria-the Bride (Anusha's Friend)
- Nishant Tanwar as Inspector Bhatnagar
- Aditya Jadhav as Crying Child
