= Gubbi (film) =

Indian Kannada-language romantic drama film

- Directed by: Vijay
- Written by: Vijay
- Produced by: Anaji Nagaraj
- Starring: Patre Ajith; Reema Worah
- Cinematography: M R Seenu
- Edited by: Srinivasa Babu
- Music by: Arjun Janya
- Release date: 24 September 2010
- Country: India
- Language: Kannada

Gubbi is a 2010 Indian Kannada-language romantic drama film directed by Vijay and starring Patre Ajith and Reema Worah.

== Cast ==
- Patre Ajith as Gautham
- Reema Worah as Ramya
- Giri as Naidu
- Rangayana Raghu as Gowda
- Bobby
- Vishwa
- Deepak
- Kailash
- Achyuth Kumar
- Petrol Prasanna
- Mico Nagaraj
- Veena Sundar
- Rachana Maurya in the item number "Neerinalli"

== Music ==
Gubbi

Soundtrack album by Arjun Janya
- Released: 2010
- Recorded: 2010
- Genre: Feature film soundtrack
- Length: 24:25
- Language: Kannada
- Label: Ashwini Recording Company

The song "Neerinalli" is a remix of the song of the same name from Bedi Bandavalu (1968) by R. Sudarsanam.

All music is composed by Arjun Janya.

Track listing
No.	Title	Singer(s)	Length
1.	"Confusion"	Sumanth, Arjun Janya	5:00
2.	"Ee Paapi"	Haricharan	5:46
3.	"Ee Pari Tavaka"	Karthik	5:00
4.	"Gulabi Theme"	Arjun Janya	1:52
5.	"Modala Todala"	Karthik	3:09
6.	"Neerinalli"	Anuradha Bhat	3:38
Total length:			24:25

== Reception ==
A critic from The New Indian Express wrote that "Gubbi is a perfect blend of a love story and underworld activities. Vijay, who makes debut as a director, has handled the megaphone well for this film that showcases the other side of Bangalore". A critic from The Times of India wrote that "Vijay's directorial debut has touched a high note with his selection of a romantic story with interesting action sequences. Armed with a good script, the director has tried to ensure that the story moves at a quick pace laced with good music by Arjun to cheer up dull scenes". A critic from IANS wrote that "Gubbi will be a treat to watch for youngsters and an enjoyable fare for the family audience".
