= Anchal Singh =

Indian actress

Anchal G Singh
- Born: 5 April 1992; Chandigarh, Punjab, India
- Occupation: Actress
- Years active: 2013–present
- Known for: Sri Siddhartha Gautama; Yeh Kaali Kaali Ankhein

Anchal G Singh (born 5 April 1992) is an Indian actress. She is known for the films Dhilluku Dhuddu and Zakhmi. She also featured in SonyLIV's Undekhi and Netflix's Yeh Kaali Kaali Ankhein. She also acted in a Sri Lankan film Sri Siddhartha Gautama in 2013 as Princess Yasodhara.

== Career ==
=== 2013-2016 ===
In 2013, Singh made her film debut with Sri Siddhartha Gautama, in which she played Princess Yashodhara. It was a biographical film based on the life of Gautama Buddha. The film consisted of Indian and Sri Lankan actors. The movie was released in over 20 countries being dubbed into many languages such as in Mandarin Chinese, Thai, Vietnamese, and Hindi and was also subtitled in French, Japanese, Vietnamese, Chinese, and Hindi. It became the highest-grossing film in the history of Sri Lankan Cinema, earning many accolades. Mahinda Rajapaksa, the then President of Sri Lanka personally congratulated Singh on her performance. After a successful debut, Singh was a part of another Sinhalese film - Akarsha, a story set in the backdrop of a war portraying a love affair between a Tamil music teacher and a Sinhalese army officer.

Following her Sri Lankan film debut, she made her Bollywood debut with a film Ramaiya Vastavaiya in that same year. In 2014, she appeared in another Hindi film Holiday: A Soldier Is Never Off Duty.

In 2016, she made her Kollywood debut with Dhilluku Dhuddu which was directed by Rambhala. She played the female lead opposite Santhanam in that film.

=== 2019-present ===
In 2019, Singh made her debut in the Punjabi film industry with - PunjKhaab alongside Gurpreet Ghuggi and Monica Gill, a film directed by Gurcharan Singh under Prabh Films for Punjabi Cinema. The film was announced in 2017. The cinematographer of the film was Anushul Chaobey. Punjkhaab was based various types of societal stereotypes and stigmas that plague Punjab. In 2020, she co-starred in Zakhmi with Dev Kharoud. Zakhmi was directed by Inderpal Singh. The movie was under the banners of Binnu Dhillon and Anshu Munish Sahni. It was released on 7 February 2020.

In 2020, Singh made her OTT debut with SonyLIV's Undekhi. She will now be seen in Undekhi (Season 2) reprising the role of Teji Grewal.

In 2022, she featured in Netflix's Yeh Kaali Kaali Ankhein (both seasons) opposite Tahir Raj Bhasin. She received widespread recognition for her portrayal of Purva. The series is revived for a second season.

== Filmography ==
=== Films ===
Year	Title	Role	Language	Notes	Ref.
2013	Sri Siddhartha Gautama	Princess Yashodhara	Sinhala		
2013	Ramaiya Vastavaiya	Ria	Hindi		
2014	Holiday		Hindi		
2016	Jackson Durai	Amy Jackson	Tamil		
2016	Dhilluku Dhuddu	Kajal	Tamil		
2019	Punj Khaab	Rajjo	Punjabi		
2019	Bomb Jigra		Punjabi		
2020	Zakhmi	Reet	Punjabi		

=== Web series ===
Year	Title	Role	Language	Notes	Ref.
2020–2026	Undekhi	Teji Grewal	Hindi		
2022–2024	Yeh Kaali Kaali Ankhein	Purva Awasthi	Hindi		

=== Music videos ===
Year	Title	Singer	Ref.
2012	Rut Ne Jo Bansi Bajai	Falguni Pathak	
2018	Sanam Mennu	Sanam	
2022	Mere Haniyaa	Arko Pravo Mukherjee	
