= Yeh Kaali Kaali Ankhein =

Romantic crime-mystery, thriller series

- Promotional artwork
- Genre: Crime thriller
- Created by: Sidharth Sengupta
- Written by: Sidharth Sengupta; Varun Badola; Anahata Menon; Umesh Padalkar
- Directed by: Sidharth Sengupta
- Starring: Tahir Raj Bhasin; Shweta Tripathi; Anchal Singh; Prachi Jain
- Music by: Shivam Sengupta & Anuj Danait
- Composers: Shivam Sengupta & Anuj Danait
- Country of origin: India
- Original language: Hindi
- No. of seasons: 2
- No. of episodes: 14

Production
- Executive producer: Vishal Bajaj
- Producers: Jyoti Sagar; Sidharth Sengupta
- Cinematography: Murzy Pagdiwala (Season 1); Murli Krishna (Season 2)
- Editor: Rajesh G. Pandey
- Running time: 31-51 minutes
- Production company: Edgestorm

Original release
- Network: Netflix
- Release: 14 January 2022 – present

Yeh Kaali Kaali Ankhein (transl. These Black Black Eyes) is an Indian Hindi-language romantic crime thriller television series on Netflix created and directed by Sidharth Sengupta. The series stars Tahir Raj Bhasin, Shweta Tripathi and Anchal Singh in the lead roles with Saurabh Shukla, Surya Sharma, Arunoday Singh and Brijendra Kala playing supporting roles. The title of the series is derived from a song of the same name from the 1993 film Baazigar.

== Cast ==
- Tahir Raj Bhasin as Vikrant Singh Chauhan
- Shweta Tripathi as Shikha
- Anchal Singh as Purva Awasthi
- Arunoday Singh as Aditya Jalan, a kidnapper
- Gurmeet Choudhary as Guru
- Surya Sharma as Dharmesh
- Saurabh Shukla as Akheraj Awasthi "Vidrohi", Purva's Father
- Anant V Joshi as Golden, Vikrant's best friend
- Brijendra Kala as Vikrant's father
- Hetal Gada as Pallavi, Vikrant's sister
- Sunita Rajwar as Vikrant's mother
- Vikrant Koundal in special appearance
- Aasif Sheikh in special appearance
- Varun Badola as Sherpa
- Nikhil Pandey as Akhil Bhatnagar, Shikha's husband

== Episodes ==
Series	Episodes	Originally released	
Series	Episodes	First released	Last released
1	8	14 January 2022	14 January 2022
2	6	22 November 2024	22 November 2024

=== Season 1 (2022) ===
No.	Title	Directed by	Written by	Original release date	Length (Minutes)
1	"Teri Baari Hai"	Sidharth Sengupta	Sidharth Sengupta, Varun Badola, Anahata Menon & Umesh Padalkar	14 January 2022	42 Minutes
2	"Band Toh Bajega"	Sidharth Sengupta	Sidharth Sengupta, Varun Badola, Anahata Menon & Umesh Padalkar	14 January 2022	39 Minutes
3	"Bandook Aur Hawaii Chappal"	Sidharth Sengupta	Sidharth Sengupta, Varun Badola, Anahata Menon & Umesh Padalkar	14 January 2022	31 Minutes
4	"4 Goliyaan"	Sidharth Sengupta	Sidharth Sengupta, Varun Badola, Anahata Menon & Umesh Padalkar	14 January 2022	40 Minutes
5	"Do You Love Me?"	Sidharth Sengupta	Sidharth Sengupta, Varun Badola, Anahata Menon & Umesh Padalkar	14 January 2022	42 Minutes
6	"Jack and Jill"	Sidharth Sengupta	Sidharth Sengupta, Varun Badola, Anahata Menon & Umesh Padalkar	14 January 2022	38 Minutes
7	"Seedha Sa Plan"	Sidharth Sengupta	Sidharth Sengupta, Varun Badola, Anahata Menon & Umesh Padalkar	14 January 2022	39 Minutes
8	"The Crying Game"	Sidharth Sengupta	Sidharth Sengupta, Varun Badola, Anahata Menon & Umesh Padalkar	14 January 2022	51 Minutes

=== Season 2 (2024) ===
No.	Title	Directed by	Written by	Original release date	Length (Minutes)
9	"Lag Gaye Kismat Ke Ghode"	Sidharth Sengupta	Sidharth Sengupta, Varun Badola, Anahata Menon & Umesh Padalkar	22 November 2024	42 Minutes
10	"Aasmaan Se Gira Khajur Pe Atka"	Sidharth Sengupta	Sidharth Sengupta, Varun Badola, Anahata Menon & Umesh Padalkar	22 November 2024	43 Minutes
11	"Aage Kuan Peeche Khaai"	Sidharth Sengupta	Sidharth Sengupta, Varun Badola, Anahata Menon & Umesh Padalkar	22 November 2024	43 Minutes
12	"Saajan Niklu Bekaar"	Sidharth Sengupta	Sidharth Sengupta, Varun Badola, Anahata Menon & Umesh Padalkar	22 November 2024	41 Minutes
13	"Nehle Pe Dehla"	Sidharth Sengupta	Sidharth Sengupta, Varun Badola, Anahata Menon & Umesh Padalkar	22 November 2024	41 Minutes
14	"Maar Hi Daaloge"	Sidharth Sengupta	Sidharth Sengupta, Varun Badola, Anahata Menon & Umesh Padalkar	22 November 2024	40 Minutes

== Music ==
Nirahua Yadav

== Release ==
Yeh Kaali Kaali Ankhein was released on Netflix on 14 January 2022.

The second season of the show was released on Netflix on 22 November 2024.
