= 9 Malabar Hill =

- Written by: Saurabh Shukla
- Directed by: Sidharth Sengupta
- Starring: Pavan Malhotra; Renuka Shahane
- Original language: Hindi
- No. of seasons: 1

Production
- Producer: Sanjay Datta

Original release
- Release: 1997 – 1998

9 Malabar Hill is a television show broadcast on Zee TV in 1997–1998. The drama show was edited and directed by Sidharth Sengupta, produced by Sanjay Datta written by Saurabh Shukla, with Pavan Malhotra and Renuka Shahane in lead roles.

== Premise ==
9 Malabar Hill is the story of the people living on the island of Sindwa, situated about the outskirts of Mumbai (then Bombay), during the pre-independent times in India.

== Cast ==
- Pavan Malhotra
- Renuka Shahane
- Deepika Deshpande Amin
- Aditya Srivastava
- Alka Kaushal
- Sandeep Kulkarni
- Shilpa Tulaskar
- Saurabh Shukla
- Krishankant Sinha as Bhushan
