= Na Umra Ki Seema Ho =

Indian drama television series

- Genre: Drama
- Directed by: Dharmesh Shah
- Creative director: Nitin Dwivedi
- Starring: Iqbal Khan; Rachana Mistry
- Music by: Paresh Shah
- Opening theme: Na Umra Ki Seema Ho
- Country of origin: India
- Original language: Hindi
- No. of episodes: 313

Production
- Producers: Atul Ketkar; Aparna Ketkar
- Running time: 20-24 minutes
- Production company: Right Click Media Solutions

Original release
- Network: Star Bharat
- Release: 26 July 2022 – 18 August 2023

Na Umra Ki Seema Ho (transl. No Age Limit; international title: Timeless Love) is an Indian Hindi-language drama television series that aired from 26 July 2022 to 18 August 2023 on Star Bharat and digitally streams on Disney+ Hotstar. Produced by Right Click Media Solutions, it starred Iqbal Khan and Rachana Mistry.

== Plot ==
The series follows Devvrat “Dev” Raichand, a respectable 45 year old businessman, and Vidhi Sharma, a timid 21 year old middle class employee.

To financially assist her family, Vidhi gets a job as an intern in Dev’s company. Seeing her dedication, Dev admires Vidhi’s work and decides to help her prepare for an upcoming MBA exam. The two of them form a friendship and also begin to meet outside of work, gradually developing feelings for one another. In the meantime, Vidhi’s parents, Bimla and Hariprasad, consider finding Vidhi a prospective groom. After much hesitation, Vidhi agrees. Vidhi realises she is in love with Dev, but does not share it with anyone.

Vidhi’s parents tell her that if she is to marry someone of her choice, then she has to marry someone closer to her age, explaining that she will not be happy with a much older man. Vidhi tries to reason with them without revealing her love for Dev. Hariprasad makes an example out of Dev’s step-mother, Satyavati, who became a widow at a young age. Shantanu, Dev’s late father, married Satyavati, who was much younger than him, post the passing of Dev’s mother, Ganga. This makes Vidhi tense and she keeps her feelings to herself.

Dev realises Vidhi is in love with him. Due to their age gap and difference in background status, Dev is initially in denial, but eventually accepts that he too is in love with her. After many failed attempts, Vidhi confesses her love for Dev. Meanwhile, Hariprasad’s sister-in-law, Urmila, finds out about Vidhi’s feelings. Urmila reveals the truth but Hariprasad does not believe her. When he makes Vidhi swear on his life, she admits the truth. Hariprasad breaks ties with Vidhi and has a heart attack. Bimla, initially angry with Vidhi, as well as Dev, asks him to stay away from them. Dev later confess his love for Vidhi, but makes her understand that they cannot be together because of their age gap.

Amba Mehta, Dev’s one sided obsessive lover, uses Dev’s younger half-sister, Chitra, who is married to her nephew, Vikram, to get closer to Dev. Amba manipulates Chitra into asking Dev to marry Amba. Dev reluctantly agrees to make his sister and mother happy. On the engagement day, Satyavati finds a letter Dev had written, expressing his love for Vidhi and requests him to back out and apologises for indirectly forcing Dev to marry Amba. Devastated, Amba blames Vidhi, threatening to ruin her life and steal Dev just as she did.

Hariprasad and Vidhi’s relationship improves, but he is still against her relationship with Dev. When Vidhi is suddenly diagnosed with an incurable disease, which would claim her life in 3 months, Hariprasad agrees to Dev and Vidhi’s relationship, but Satyavati is reluctant as she does not want Dev to spend the rest of his life lonely, as she did. Amba, feigning sympathy, manipulates Vidhi into asking Dev to marry Amba as her dying wish. Dev agrees to this, exciting Amba, unaware that it is a trap that will expose her for threatening and bribing a doctor to give a false diagnosis. After being exposed and yet again rejected by Dev for Vidhi, Amba swears revenge and joins hands with Yogesh, Dev’s employee and cunning best friend, who wants revenge from Dev and Vidhi, who he believes ruined his son, Arjun’s life. Meanwhile, Hariprasad gives his blessing to Dev and Vidhi.

During the wedding functions, Bimla’s long distant niece, Divya Roy, arrives from London. She seems to share similarities with Dev, which everyone seem to notice. Satyavati’s dominant and cunning older sister, Damyanti, arrives for Dev’s wedding. Although she participates in the rituals in place of Dev’s mother as Satyavati is a widow, she disapproves of Dev and Vidhi, and does not consider them family. On Dev and Vidhi’s sangeet, Amba arrives in an intoxicated state, threatening to take revenge. After her haldi ceremony, Vidhi hears gossiping guests labelling her a gold digger. This hurts and prompts Vidhi to give Dev a signed prenup. On the other hand, Chitra is unable to attend the wedding functions due to Amba’s compulsion of having to choose between families, but secretly performs a ritual for Dev right before the wedding.

Dev and Vidhi finally tie the knot, but Dev is forced to go to Dubai for business, which is a part of Amba and Yogesh’s plan. During this time, Priya, Abhimanyu’s wife, is blackmailed by her lover and personal trainer, Rakesh, with intimate pictures. Vidhi finds out and approaches Priya to help, believing she is innocent. Just as Priya is about to leave with a lump sum of money, Dev and Abhimanyu arrive. Noticing her nervous behaviour, Abhimanyu eventually finds out about Priya’s affair. Priya begs him not to expose her to which he agrees, but to save his brother and sister in-law from his troubles, Abhimanyu sends Dev and Vidhi to Goa for their honeymoon. While there, Amba meets with Vidhi and reveals to her that Dev has a 24 year old daughter, from a relationship he had in 1998. Vidhi refuses to believe this but is left bothered. The honeymoon is cut short when Dev suddenly runs out of money and Vidhi receives a call from Priya and Abhimanyu’s daughter, Simran “Simmi”, who tells them that Priya and Abhimanyu are getting divorced.

Upon returning home, Dev and Vidhi find the family in conflict. This also puts a strain on their relationship. Rakesh is revealed to be working for Amba, and constantly pesters Priya on Amba’s instructions. Abhimanyu meets up with Rakesh and beats him up, only to get arrested, but is released on bail. While cleaning, Vidhi finds a diary from 1998 that belongs to Dev scattered amongst other items. When Dev is unable to find it, he asks Vidhi and she shows him where she placed it. Dev asks if she read it to which Vidhi honestly replies that even though they are married, it is his personal diary. Later, when she is tidying up again, she finds that the diary is missing amongst his other yearly diaries. When she casually asks Dev what is written in it, he irritatedly gives Vidhi’s reply from a few days back. Vidhi becomes tense and thinks Dev is hiding something from her, and thinks about what Amba told her. When she tries to indirectly ask Dev if he is hiding something from her, Dev irritatedly rebukes her, questioning her trust in him, adding to their strained relationship. Due to this, Vidhi goes back home on Dev’s suggestion, but leaves without informing him.

On Holi, Dev and his family go to Vidhi’s home, where Dev apologises to Vidhi and offers her to read his 1998 diary. Trusting him, Vidhi refuses and they celebrate Holi, with Chitra finally allowed by Amba to see her family. Happiness does not last long when Bimla’s namesake sister and Divya’s mother, Yamini Roy arrives. While visiting her mother, Vidhi overhears Divya declaring herself Dev’s daughter. Shocked and heartbroken, she leaves without informing anyone, goes back to Dev’s house and reads Dev’s 1998 diary. Towards the end of the diary, Dev has written a lot about Yamini, who used to be his college friend. Vidhi realises Amba was telling the truth and leaves to roam the streets mindlessly.

Amba finds Vidhi first and offers to take her home, but Vidhi insists on going to Amba’s house. The next day, Amba takes Vidhi to meet up with the Raichands and her family, where Amba reveals everything. Dev denies everything and pleads with Vidhi to believe him. Bimla and Hariprasad take Vidhi home, where Dev follows them and pleads his innocence, but Vidhi shuts him out. He convinces her to ask Yamini the truth but Divya won't let them see her as she was admitted in hospital after suffering an asthma attack. The next day, Yamini tells everyone that she was in love with Dev, however, he is not Divya’s father and that they never had a relationship. In denial, Divya says that she is lying to protect Dev and Vidhi’s marriage. She further submits a DNA test she secretly took. Much to her disappointment, the results back up Dev and Yamini. She apologises and gives in her resignation letter but Dev forgives her easily. Vidhi also apologises to Dev and is also forgiven easily. Before Yamini leaves, Dev asks her why Divya thought he is her father, to which she replies that a mysterious woman used to contact Divya in London, giving her false hints about who her father is. Dev immediately figures out that Amba was behind everything and he confronts her.

Rakesh continues blackmailing Priya and has Abhimanyu intervene. Rakesh calls Abhimanyu to Simmi’s school, where he provokes him and they get into a fight. Upon seeing this, Vidhi, who was fetching Simmi, gets in between and Rakesh flees on foot. He meets with Amba and Yogesh and asks Amba for his payment. To incriminate Abhimanyu, Amba has her bodyguards beat up Rakesh, landing him in hospital. Amba then bribes a nurse to inject Rakesh’s drip, leading to his death. Abhimanyu is arrested and charged for murder. Vidhi is requested to be a witness for Abhimanyu, to which she agrees. In court, Rakesh’s lawyer pressurises Vidhi to give a yes or no answer without letting her explain what really occurred, incriminating Abhimanyu. The judge finds Abhimanyu guilty and announces his sentencing will take place later. This gives Vidhi and Dev some time to gather evidence. On the day of his sentencing, Vidhi provides the court with solid evidence that proves Abhimanyu innocent. Back at home, a remorseful Priya agrees to touch Dev and Vidhi’s feet in appreciation and respect. Damyanti tries to manipulate Priya but in vain.

Just as everything seems to be going well, Amba steals Dev’s company after Yogesh is exposed and they both fire Dev and Abhimanyu. On Dev’s birthday, Amba goes to his house and claims that the house belongs to her as well. She gives an ultimatum that if they want to continue living there, Vidhi has to leave. Vidhi agrees, but Dev, Abhimanyu and Satyavati stand by her and leave with their belongings and live in Dev’s ashram. Priya, Simmi, Chitra, Damyanti and her husband remain behind. While staying at the ashram, they run behind on school fees and other payments. Dev finds a job and begins working for his friend. Though they are struggling financially, the Raichands find happiness in living together. Chitra comes to live with them for a few days and is revealed to be pregnant with Vikram’s baby.

Meanwhile, a kind hearted business tycoon, visits the temple in the Sharma residence, Ram Shah. He admires Hariprasad and Bimla for being honest people. Later, he meets Vidhi at a pawn shop and admires her honesty too during an exchange. At a business event, Vidhi and Dev cross paths with Jay Shah, who turns out to be Ram’s son. Vidhi begins working for Jay, and they seem to get along, however, Jay begins developing feelings for Vidhi, despite being aware of her marriage to Dev. He begins feeling jealous and grows obsessed with Vidhi, believing that Dev trapped her. Ram finds out that Jay is in love with Vidhi and warns him against doing anything that is morally wrong. Later, Ram dies in an accident, which Dev feels he is responsible for, but Jay doesn't press charges. He begins making Vidhi work overtime or uses Chitra, who turns out to be his childhood friend, as a means to get closer to her. He even pays a woman, Sakshi, to work as Dev’s personal assistant, only to spy on him.

Soon, Vidhi and Dev find out that Vidhi is pregnant and they rejoice along with their families. Satyavati advises Vidhi not tell outsiders before finishing the first trimester as a means to avoid negative energy. Vidhi complies, however, ends up blurting out her pregnancy to Jay when he tries to force her into drinking champagne, despite Vidhi declining multiple times. Jay pretends to feel bad and congratulate her, but in truth, feels that Dev intentionally impregnated Vidhi to oppress her. He later pours oil on the stairs at their workplace, intending to make Vidhi slip and fall, which is a success, however, it unfortunately results in Vidhi’s miscarriage. Both families are devastated and Hariprasad stops believing in their home deity, refusing to worship it, blaming the goddess for Vidhi’s troubles.

Later, Amba begins seeing a doctor for an IVF procedure so that she can conceive Dev’s child. Jay, on the other hand begins rebuffing Sakshi when she tells him that Dev is a good man. He also refuses to help her with a personal issue. Meanwhile, Dev begins growing suspicious of Jay. When Vidhi is kidnapped, Dev suspects Amba, but after confronting her, he realises she's telling the truth and focuses on Jay. Vidhi regains consciousness, only to find herself tied up in Jay’s house. He expresses his love for Vidhi and compels her to sign divorce papers, which he later sends to Dev. When he receives them, Dev realises Vidhi is in trouble from the way she signed the papers. He tries to follow Jay but putting a tracker on his car, but Jay discovers it and tricks him. Sakshi receives help from Dev and feels guilty for spying on him. As a way to show gratitude, Sakshi hints at Dev that Vidhi is in Jay’s house.

Dev receives Sakshi’s message and quickly figures out the meaning. Meanwhile, Jay tries to force Vidhi into marrying him but Dev arrives just on time. A fight ensues between them and Jay reveals that he caused Vidhi’s miscarriage. Vidhi is devastated by this news and lashes out Jay, criticising his so-called love right before he is arrested. Jay’s arrest is televised and Chitra is devastated by learning the truth about him. Vidhi’s parents are also shocked and devastated that Ram, a man of principals, had a son like Jay. Dev and Vidhi return home safely.

Later, they begin trying for another child. Soon enough, Vidhi falls pregnant. Amba’s IVF procedure is unsuccessful and is devastated by the news. She goes to Vidhi’s home, where she confesses right before she is arrested on the charges of identity theft for the IVF procedure. Bimla urges Hariprasaad to renew his faith in the goddess as all of Vidhi’s enemies are being punished. He relents and steps in the temple. Both families take a picture and the show ends on a good note.

== Cast ==
=== Main ===
- Rachana Mistry as Vidhi Raichand: Hariprasad and Bimla's daughter; Dev's employee turned wife
- Iqbal Khan as
  - Devvrat "Dev" Raichand: Ganga and Shantanu's son; Satyavati's stepson; Abhimanyu and Chitra's half brother; Vidhi's boss turned husband
  - Shantanu Raichand: Ganga's widower; Satyavati's husband; Dev, Abhimanyu and Chitra's father; Simran's grandfather (2023) (Dead)

=== Recurring ===
- Sneha Wagh as Amba "Ami" Mehta: Vaikunth's daughter; Dev's friend and obsessive one sided lover
- Deepshikha Nagpal as Satyavati Raichand: Damyanti's younger sister; Shantanu's widow; Abhimanyu and Chitra's mother; Dev's step mother; Simran's grandmother
- Rishina Kandhari as Priya Raichand: Abhimanyu's wife; Simran's mother
- Sonali Khare as Yamini Roy: Bimla's sister; Dev's college friend; Divya's mother (2023)
- Deepak Dutta as Hariprasad Sharma: Bimla's husband; Vidhi's father
- Hemaakshi Ujjain as Bimla Sharma: Yamini's sister; Hariprasad's wife; Vidhi's mother
- Aarohi Patel / Tejaswi Bhadane as Seema: Hariprasad and Bimla's niece (2022) / (2023)
- Ramshankar Singh as Abhimanyu Raichand: Satyavati and Shantanu's son; Ganga's stepson; Chitra's brother; Dev's half brother; Priya's husband; Simran's father
- Reena Singh as Damayanti: Satyavati's elder sister (2023)
- Vandana Rao as Chitra Mehta (nee Raichand): Satyavati and Shantanu's daughter; Ganga's stepdaughter; Abhimanyu's sister; Dev's half sister; Vikram's wife
- Chirag Joshi / Vijay Tilani as Vikram Mehta: Chitra's husband (2022) / (2023)
- Rakesh Paul as Yogesh Mehra: Kanika's husband; Dev's business partner; Arjun's father
- Samidha Guru as Kanika Mehra: Yogesh's wife; Dev's business partner; Arjun's mother
- Swati Tarar as Urmila Sharma: Golden's mother
- Vijay Kalvani as Mr. Sharma: Hariprasad's brother; Urmila's husband; Golden's father
- Jinal Jain as Golden Sharma: Urmila's daughter
- Varsha Sharma as Divya Roy: Yamini's daughter; Dev's employee (2023)
- Surendra Pal as Pratap: Neeli's husband; Shantanu's best friend (2022)
- Hemant Choudhary as Damayanti's husband (2023)
- Mehul Kajaria as Kaushik Pandey: Dev's friend (2023)
- Karan Suchak as Jay Shah: Ram's son; Vidhi's boss and one sided obsessive lover (2023)
- Ajay Trehan as Ram Shah: Jay's father (2023) (Dead)
- Maleeka Ghai as A.C.P. Durga (2023)
- Aman Mishra as Abhiroop (2023)
- Somendra Solanki as Arjun Mehra: Yogesh and Kanika's son (2022)
- Abhimanyu Arora as Shashi: Jay's right hand (2023)
- Garima Jain as Sakshi: Jay's spy; Dev's personal assistant (2023)

== Production ==
=== Development ===
The series was conceptualized to challenge societal stereotypes by portraying a romantic relationship with a significant age gap. According to Deepshikha Nagpal, the show “mirrors our society” by bravely addressing often-taboo themes of age-disparate love.

Led by the experienced director Dharmesh Shah and produced by Atul and Aparna Ketkar under Right Click Media Solutions, Na Umra Ki Seema Ho drew attention for its modern storytelling approach, focusing on mutual respect and equality in relationships.

Iqbal Khan, who plays Dev, emphasized the show’s progressive ethos, especially regarding gender equality and the empowerment of women within a conservative household. In a related interview, he described Dev as an inspiring character who treats women with respect and upholds strong values.

The visual presentation of the series was further enhanced by high production values. A prominent example is the grand wedding sequence featuring designer attire by Riyaz Gangji, underscoring the show’s commitment to cinematic aesthetics even within a television format.

The show's title is based on the song "Hothon Se Chhu Lo Tum" sung by Jagjit Singh from the 1981 film Prem Geet.

=== Casting ===
Rachana Mistry and Iqbal Khan were cast as the leads.

=== Release ===
The first promo was released on 13 July 2022, and the first episode was released on 26 July 2022.

== Soundtrack ==
Na Umra Ki Seema Ho Original Sound Track

Soundtrack album by Paresh Shah
- Released: 26 July 2022
- Genres: Romance; Soundtrack
- Length: 2:20
- Language: Hindi
- Label: Star India
- Producers: Atul Ketkar; Aparna Ketkar

Na Umra Ki Seema Ho soundtrack is composed by Paresh Shah. The title track is the theme song of Dev and Vidhi.

Na Umra Ki Seema Ho: Tracklisting
No.	Title	Artist	Length
1.	"Na Umra Ki Seema Ho" (Male)	Paresh Shah	2:20

== See also ==
- List of programs broadcast by Star Bharat
