= Amit Khan =

Indian author (born 1972)

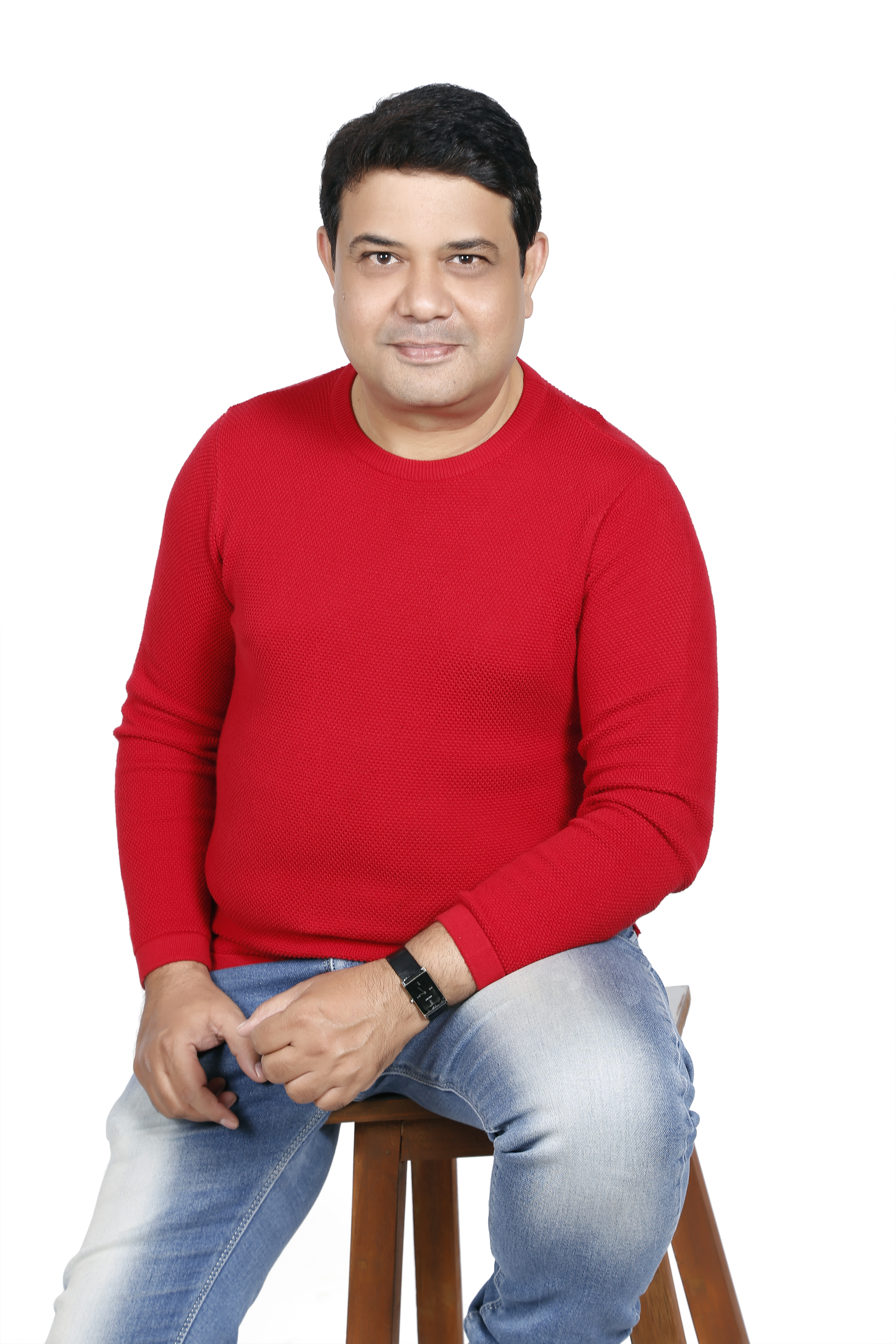
- Born: 3 March 1972 (age 54); Pilkhuwa, Ghaziabad District
- Occupations: Writer; Screenwriter; Director; Novelist
- Writing career
- Years active: 1984–present
- Genres: Suspense; Thriller; Romance
- Notable works: Commander Karan Saxena series, Reeta Sanyal series, Night Club, Garam Chhuri, Bicchoo Ka Khel and many more.

Amit Khan (born 3 March 1972) is an Indian author, screenwriter and director. His novels are also available in English, Punjabi and Marathi language.

He is the creator of ‘Commander Karan Saxena’, a character in the world of Hindi novels. He wrote 58 novels in this series. An audio drama series based on this is available on Spotify where audiences can listen to the Commander Karan Saxena's series. In the audio series Indian actor Sonu Sood is the voice of Commander Karan Saxena.

A web series, "Bicchoo ka Khel", based on his novel was produced by Ekta Kapoor. Web series and films are being created on his stories.

== Early life ==
Amit Khan was born on 3 March 1972, in Pilkhuwa, Ghaziabad district. From a young age, he was passionate about reading and writing, and he actively participated in debate competitions in school. Childhood stories of great personalities had a profound impact on his life. This is why, at the age of 12, his first published story was based on the life of American President George Washington. He had his first novel published at the age of just 15. By the time he was in 10th grade, many of his stories had already been published in prominent newspapers across the country. He went on to write numerous stories for Diamond Comics as well.

Currently, he resides in Mumbai and is actively involved in the Hindi film industry.

== Series ==
Amit Khan has written several novels, with the most popular being the Commander Karan Saxena Series. He has written a total of 58 novels in this series. There is an audio drama series based on it available on Spotify, where audiences can enjoy the adventures of Commander Karan Saxena. In the audio series, the beloved Indian superstar, Sonu Sood is voice of Commander Karan Saxena. Additionally, there are plans to create a web series based on this series in the near future.

The Reeta Sanyal series is another highly successful series written by Amit Khan. So far 22 novels have been published in this series. Reeta Sanyal is a criminal lawyer who solves murder mysteries.

The Godfather series is also one of the popular series. In this series, Amit Khan has created a fictional underworld within Goa. The boss of this underworld is Bakhtavar Singh, also known as the godfather, who becomes the voice of every weak and oppressed person, taking up arms for them.

Amit Khan has written four novels in the Sheetal Rajput series so far. Sheetal Rajput is a contract killer, and the novels in this series are filled with murder mysteries.

== Filmography ==
Sunny Deol starrer Karz – The Burden of Truth (As an additional screenplay writer).

Arbaz Khan, Manjari Fadnavis starrer – Nirdosh (As a writer and creative director).

Makrand Deshpande, Sanjay Mishra starrer – Objection My God (As a writer and director). In Nashik International film festival, the film Objection My God won the awards for best debut director, best story, screenplay and best noteworthy film.

Hindi web series "Bicchoo Ka Khel" produced by Ekta Kapoor (ALT Balaji and ZEE5) was also based on Amit Khan's novel "Bicchoo Ka Khel".

Bellamkonda Sai Sreenivas and Anupama Parmeswaran starrer – Gumnaam – A Psycho Thriller, (As a Creative Director, editor, Dialogue and Lyrics Writer), Produced by Pen Studios.

Apart from this, films and web series are being made based on his 6 novels.
