= Iqbal Khan (actor) =

Indian actor (born 1981)

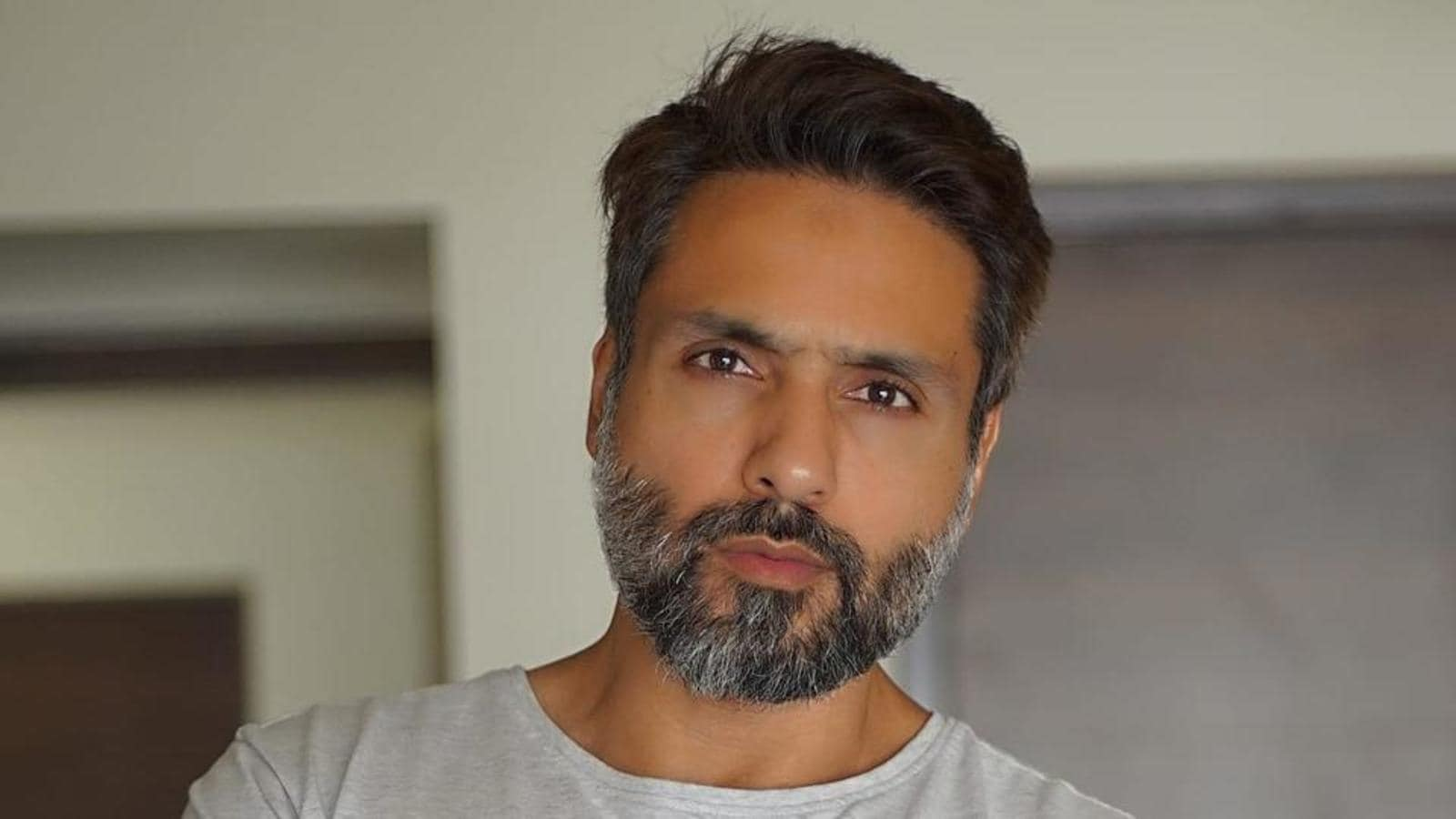
- Khan in 2023
- Born: Mohammed Iqbal Khan; 10 February 1981 (age 45); Jammu and Kashmir, India
- Occupations: Model; actor
- Years active: 2002–present
- Spouse: Sneha Chhabra Khan (m. 2007)
- Children: Ammaara Khan (daughter); Ifza Khan (daughter)

Mohammed Iqbal Khan (born 10 February 1981), more commonly known as Iqbal Khan, is an Indian actor.

== Early life ==
Khan was born in Kashmir and began school in Tyndale Biscoe School, Srinagar and was further educated at Pinegrove School Dharampur, Distt. Solan. He finished his 11th and 12th from The Lawrence School, Sanawar (founded in 1847). He was a part of Falguni Pathak's along with Sneha Chhabra in Indhana winava music video which was launched in 2001 .

== Career ==
After moving to Mumbai in 2001, he shot a number of music videos for T-series produced by Anubhav Sinha and directed by Anupam Sinha and Ratna Sinha (Jagjit Singh song). He then did his first film Fun2shh (2003) and then Bullet: Ek Dhamaka (2005). His television debut was as Angad Khanna in the serial Kaisa Ye Pyar Hai.

Soon after, he went on to play the character of Shaurya Nanda in Kkavyanjali and Raghu Malik in Kahiin To Hoga. After the ending of Kaisa Ye Pyar Hai, Khan did another serial, Karam Apnaa Apnaa, playing the role of Shiv Kapoor. He left Karam Apnaa Apnaa at the end of 2006.

He made a comeback on television with Chhoona Hai Aasmaan as the air force officer Abhimanyu Adhikari. Khan appeared in Waaris and took the lead role of Rudra in the serial Sanjog Se Bani Sangini. He portrayed Dr. Viren Roy in Yahan Main Ghar Ghar Kheli from March to June 2012.

In 2015, Khan joined with Ekta Kapoor and was cast in a double role on a limited-episode series for Sony Entertainment Television, winning two awards for it.

In July 2016, Khan was criticized for his Facebook post comparing Indian administered Kashmir with Palestine.

In 2016, Khan was also seen in And TV's show Waaris as Charan Pawania. In the same year, he joined as Akbar in Bharatvarsh and as Nawab Iqbal Khan in Ek Tha Raja Ek Thi Rani. In 2017, he appears as a cameo in Life OK's show Bahu Hamari Rajni Kant as Super Robot. From 2017 to 2018, he enter the Star Bharat's show Kaal Bhairav Rahasya as Indra Prakash / Sethji. In 2018, he appears as Iqbal in Colors TV's show Dil Se Dil Tak and Guest in Juzz Baatt.

After a four-year absence, in February 2022 he made a comeback with Colors TV's show Nima Denzongpa where he played the role Virat Sethi. He quit the show in July 2022.

From July 2022 to August 2023, he was seen as a middle aged businessman, Devvrat "Dev" Raichand in Atul Kelkar's show Na Umra Ki Seema Ho on Star Bharat.

== Personal life ==
Khan is married to Sneha Chhabra, whom he met at a shoot of a video album. They have a daughter Ammaara, who was born in 2011. They had second child, a daughter on 11 February 2022, whom they named Ifza Khan.

== Filmography ==
=== Film ===
| Year | Title | Role |
|---|---|---|
| 2003 | Fun2shh... Dudes in the 10th Century | Vicky |
| 2005 | Bullet: Ek Dhamaka | Agent Arjun |
| 2014 | Unforgettable | Anand |
| 2019 | Mumbai Apli Ahe | Don Iqbal |
| 2020 | Indoo Ki Jawani | Investigating Officer |
| 2022 | Jalsa | Amar |
| 2022 | X or Y | Rohan |

=== Television ===
| Year | Serial | Role |
|---|---|---|
| 2005 | Kahiin To Hoga | Raghu Malik |
| 2005–2006 | Kaisa Ye Pyar Hai | Angad Khanna / Zaib / Rishi Agarwal |
| 2006 | Kkavyanjali | Shaurya Nanda |
| 2006 | Karam Apnaa Apnaa | Shiv Kapoor |
| 2007–2008 | Chhoona Hai Aasmaan | Flight Lieutenant / Wing Commander Abhimanyu Adhikari |
| 2008 | Waaris | Shankar Pratapsingh |
| 2010–2011 | Sanjog Se Bani Sangini | Rudra Singh Rawat |
| 2012 | Yahan Main Ghar Ghar Kheli | Dr. Viren Roy |
| 2012 | Teri Meri Love Stories | Nikhil |
| 2013–2014 | Tumhari Pakhi | Anshuman Rathore |
| 2014 | Tumhari Pakhi | Aryaman Rathore |
| 2015 | Fear Factor: Khatron Ke Khiladi 6 | Contestant |
| 2015–2016 | Pyaar Ko Ho Jaane Do | Ishaan Hooda / Rizwan Ahmed Khan |
| 2016 | Waaris | Charan Pawania |
| 2016 | Bharatvarsh | Akbar |
| 2016–2017 | Ek Tha Raja Ek Thi Rani | Nawab Iqbal Khan |
| 2017 | Bahu Hamari Rajni Kant | Super Robot |
| 2017–2018 | Kaal Bhairav Rahasya | Indra Prakash / Sethji |
| 2018 | Dil Se Dil Tak | Iqbal Khan |
| 2019 | Kitchen Champion | Contestant |
| 2022 | Parineetii | Virat Sethi |
| 2022 | Nima Denzongpa | Virat Sethi |
| 2022–2023 | Na Umra Ki Seema Ho | Devvrat "Dev" Raichand |
| 2026 | Hui Gumm Yaadein – Ek Doctor, Do Zindagiyaan | Dr. Dev Mehta |

=== Short films ===
| Year | Title | Role | Notes | Ref. |
|---|---|---|---|---|
| 2019 | Ek choti si ego | Viraj | | |

=== Web series ===
| Year | Title | Role |
|---|---|---|
| 2020 | Ratri Ke Yatri | Garry |
| 2020 | The Bull of Dalal Street | Harshil Mehra |
| 2020 | Crackdown | Zorawar Kalra |
| 2022 | Doon Kaand | DSP Arvind Rawat |
| 2024 | Commander Karan Saxena | ISI Chief Nasir Khan |

== Awards ==
Indian Telly Awards

- Best Debutant – 2005
- Most Popular Actor in Leading Role – 2006
- Best Onscreen Jodi – 2006

Zee Gold Awards

- Best Onscreen Jodi – 2014
