= Saath Saath Banayenge Ek Aashiyaan =

Indian drama television series

- Promotional logo
- Created by: Meteor Films
- Directed by: Kamal Monga, Vijay Saini, & Sandeep Vijay
- Starring: Gagan Malik as Uday; Amit Tandon/Salil Acharya as Abhay; Tulika Upadhyay as Leeza; Reema Vohra as Lajwanti
- Opening theme: "Saath Saath Banayenge Ek Aashiyaan" by Prakash Nar & Team
- Country of origin: India
- Original language: Hindi
- No. of episodes: Total 158

Production
- Producers: Dinesh Bansal & Satyam Bansal
- Running time: approx. 24 minutes

Original release
- Network: Zee TV
- Release: 10 March – 6 November 2008

Saath Saath Banayenge Ek Aashiyaan (international title: East Meets West) is a Hindi television serial that aired on Zee TV starting from 10 March 2008 until 6 November 2008, based on the concept of how culture impacts on an individual's life. The series was popular at the time of release.

== Plot ==
The story is based on the lives of two grandsons of a Punjabi family (the Singh's) from Delhi, who marry girls who are culturally and geographically poles apart from each other. One hails from a small town in Punjab while the other is an NRI who has been brought up across the seven seas. The story takes many turns, romantic, emotional, dramatic and purely funny when the two girls start living under the same roof.

Abhay is the son of Ranveer (the eldest son of Mr. and Mrs. Singh, manipulative and coldhearted) and Rama (humble and respectful of her elders, fears her husband), he returns home for his grandparents' anniversary, after being in the US. His father makes a surprise announcement that, Abhay will marry his friend's daughter, Lajwanti "Lamita". However, Abhay has already fallen in love with his then girlfriend and now wife, Liza. Abhay and Liza eventually marry, causing Abhay to be disowned by Ranveer.

Uday is the son of Ranjeet (the youngest son of Mr. and Mrs. Singh, Ranveer's younger brother. Often disrespected by his wife and brother) and Rekha (malicious and takes pleasure in destroying the happiness of her family), he decides to marry Lajwanti "Lamita" at Rekha's dismay, to bring peace in the family. With so many failed attempts to stop the wedding, Uday and Lajwanti "Lamita" get married after her father undergoes a heart attack. Rekha refuses to accept Lajwanti "Lamita" as Uday's wife, unless Ranveer accepts Liza. Ranveer reluctantly brings Abhay and Liza home to Rekha's surprise.

The two daughters-in-law are given a warm welcome in the Singh Family. Rekha vows to get rid of Lajwanti "Lamita" and Ranveer has the same motives with Liza. Rekha and Ranveer go head to head trying to stop each other from each of their motives.

Liza (a very beautiful, intelligent, modern girl, respectful, yet sassy) and Lajwanti "Lamita" (illiterate, cultured village girl, humble and respectful) are two different girls, who develop a very powerful, strong and unbreakable bond much to Ranveer and Rekha's surprise and dismay. Rekha tries to break Liza and Lajwanti's relationship, but to no avail. Liza becomes aware of Rekha's plans to get rid of Lajwanti and does everything to stop her. Rekha then decides to get rid of Liza by bringing Liza's old friend Vikrant to live with them. Vikrant causes many problems in Liza's marriage, the final straw was when Vikrant at Rekha's orders made Liza sign Uma who is Abhay's younger sister's abortion papers as hers, with Vikrant as the father. Liza is thrown out of the Singh house.

With Liza gone, Lajwanti faces many difficulties alone. Rekha causes many problems for her as well, including getting her sister Jax to poison Ranveer and Lajwanti is falsely accused. Lajwanti too is thrown out of the Singh house.

With help of a woman named Saraswati, Liza and Lajwanti fight for their place in the Singh family. With so many failed attempts to expose Rekha, Liza manages to gather enough evidence against aunt Rekha. The truth eventually comes to light during Puja ceremony, after Liza took a gunshot ordered by Rekha for Lajwanti. Rekha is arrested and Ranveer finally accepts Liza.

== Cast ==
- Reema Vohra as Lajwanti "Lamita" Uday Singh: Uday's wife
- Gagan Malik as Uday Singh: Ranjeet and Rekha's younger son; Vinay's younger brother; Ruchi's elder brother; Lamita's husband
- Tulika Upadhyay as Liza Abhay Singh: Abhay's wife
- Amit Tandon / Salil Acharya as Abhay Singh: Ranveer and Rama's son; Uma's elder brother; Liza's husband
- Sunil Rege as Mr. Singh: Ranveer and Ranjeet's father; Vinay, Uday, Abhay, Ruchi and Uma's grandfather
- Renuka Israni as Mrs. Singh: Ranveer and Ranjeet's mother; Vinay, Uday, Abhay, Ruchi and Uma's grandmother
- Nimai Bali as Ranveer Singh: Ranjeet's elder brother; Rama's husband; Abhay and Uma's father
- Anita Kulkarni as Rama Ranveer Singh: Ranveer's wife; Abhay and Uma's mother
- Shikha Chitambare as Uma Singh: Ranveer and Rama's daughter; Abhay's younger sister
- Hemant Choudhary as Ranjeet Singh: Ranveer's younger brother; Rekha's husband; Vinay, Uday and Ruchi's father
- Supriya Karnik as Rekha Ranjeet Singh: Ranjeet's wife; Vinay, Uday and Ruchi's mother
- Puneet Panjwani as Vinay Singh: Ranjeet and Rekha's elder son; Uday and Ruchi's elder brother; Anjana's husband
- Sharmilee Raj as Anjana Vinay Singh: Vinay's wife
- Shivani Thakur as Ruchi Singh: Ranjeet and Rekha's daughter; Vinay and Uday's younger sister
- Narendra Gupta as Banwari
- Anup Upadhyay
- Priya Dixit
- Sunny Gill
- Arup Pal
