= Pilkhuva (Ghaziabad) =

- Town
- Location within Uttar Pradesh
- Coordinates: 28.67°N 77.42°E
- Country: India
- State: Uttar Pradesh
- District: Hapur
- Elevation: 230 m (750 ft)
- Time zone: UTC+5:30 (IST)
- PIN: 201 xxx
- Telephone code: 91-120
- Vehicle registration: UP-14, DL-18(Delhi NCR)
- Website: http://ghaziabad.nic.in/

Pilkhuva is a town in India in Ghaziabad, Uttar Pradesh, 50 kilometres from Delhi.

== Location ==
Pilkhuva lies along state highway AH-2 (Hapur road), and is surrounded by the towns of Partapur, Chajjarasi Khuleechnagar, Khera, Duhri, and Doohri village.
