= Jatin Sarna =

Indian film and theatre actor (born 1984)

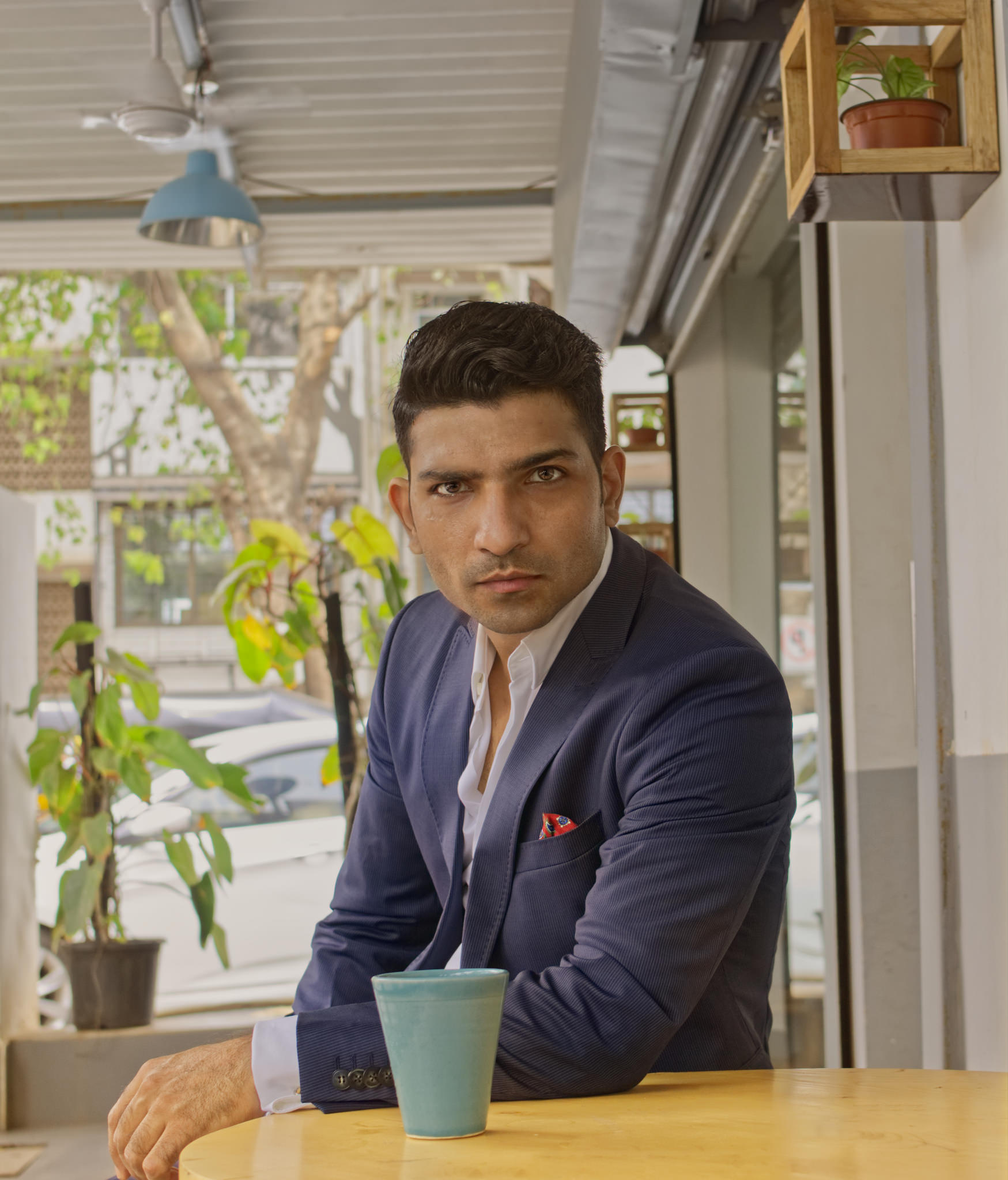
- Sarna in 2018
- Born: 2 November 1984 (age 41); New Delhi, India
- Education: Shri Ram Centre for Performing Arts New Delhi
- Occupation: Actor

Jatin Sarna (born 2 November 1984) is an Indian actor who appears in Hindi films and theatre. He is best known for his work in Meeruthiya Gangsters, Saat Uchakkey, Sonchiriya, Darbar, 83 and the two original Netflix series Sacred Games and Khakee: The Bihar Chapter. Jatin is known for his work with several Bollywood film directors such as Anurag Kashyap, Vikramaditya Motwane, AR Murugadoss, Hansal Mehta, Abhishek Chaubey, Kanu Behl and Kabir Khan.

== Personal life ==
Jatin was born and brought up in a Punjabi family in New Delhi, India. He is a commerce graduate and did his B.Com from Delhi University.

== Career ==
After completing his acting course from Shri Ram Centre for Performing Arts, Jatin acted in several plays including Spartacus, The Seagull, Hamlet, Veer Abhimanyu, Gangster Samiti, Khidki and Maharathi. He has acted in more than 25 plays. His play Gangster Samiti got tremendous response from both the audiences and critics. He acted in the television series Zindagi Dot Com, Faujji...The Iron Man and Kyunki Jeena Isi Ka Naam Hai. He also appeared in a TV commercial for Murugappa Group.

Jatin's first film role came in director Rakesh Ranjan Kumar's Dear Friend Hitler (2011), which was released as Gandhi to Hitler in India. He next appeared as Javed in Oass in 2012. In the same year he acted in a short film, A Perfect Murder, which won numerous awards at the Delhi 48 Hour Film Project including Best Actor award for Jatin. He then made brief appearances in films like Chor Chor Super Chor, O Teri and Unfreedom.

In 2015, he bagged a key role in Zeishan Quadri's Meeruthiya Gangsters, which had an ensemble cast including Jaideep Ahlawat, Aakash Dahiya, Nushrat Bharucha, Sanjay Mishra and Mukul Dev. His portrayal of Sanjay 'Foreigner' in the film got him rave reviews. In 2016, he appeared in writer director Sanjeev Sharma's Saat Uchakkey as Babbe Tashni. Despite having a stellar cast of Manoj Bajpayee, Vijay Raaz, Kay Kay Menon, Annu Kapoor and Anupam Kher, the film failed to impress the critics as well as the audiences.

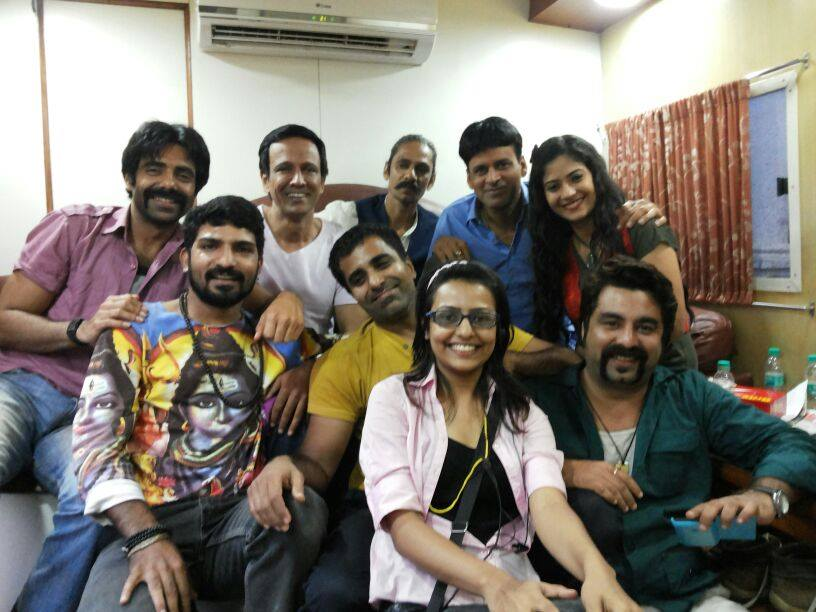
On the sets of Saat Uchakkey with Aparshakti Khurana, Kay Kay Menon, Vijay Raaz, Manoj Bajpayee

He recently appeared in On Camera with Ravie and shared his experiences and journey in Bollywood. On 8 July 2017, the Delhi premiere of his award winning short film Rage, written and directed by Ashish Balraj Sharma, was held at Instituto Cervantes, Connaught Place, New Delhi, as a part of Whatashort Independent International Film Festival.

His breakthrough performance came in the form of Deepak "Bunty" Shinde in Sacred Games, an original Netflix series directed by Anurag Kashyap and Vikramaditya Motwane. It is based on Sacred Games (novel) by Vikram Chandra (novelist). Jatin's portrayal of Bunty, the hot headed, abusive, misogynist yet loyal right hand man of Ganesh Gaitonde (Nawazuddin Siddiqui) made him an overnight sensation. He is all set to thrill the audience with his new web series titled Dark 7 White.

== Filmography ==
Key
†	Denotes films that have not yet been released

Year	Film	Role	Notes
2011	Dear Friend Hitler	Shaqir	
2012	A Perfect Murder	Contract Killer Rajat Khanna	Won 48 Hour Film Project Best Actor Award; (Short film)
2012	Oass	Inspector Javed	
2013	Chor Chor Super Chor	Ramesh	
2014	Yamdas	Yamdas	
2014	O Teri	Drunk Police Officer	
2014	Unfreedom	Janaka's Officer	
2015	NH-8: Road to Nidhivan	Police Inspector	
2015	Meeruthiya Gangsters	Sanjay 'Foreigner'	
2016	Saat Uchakkey	Babbe Tashni	
2017	Muavza: Zameen ka Paisa	Jodha	
2017	The Zero Line		
2019	Sonchiriya	Ratan Singh	
2020	Darbar	Gangster	Tamil film
2020	Bamfaad	Zahid	ZEE5 film
2020	Chhalaang	Dimpy	Amazon Prime Video film
2020	Paintra		Short film
2021	83	Yashpal Sharma	
2025	Sikandar	De Niro	
2026	Na Jaane Kaun Aa Gaya	Kaushal Agarwal	
2026	Maa Behen	Rekha's husband	
2026	Gandhari	Kabir	Netflix
2026	Jailer 2	Ved Kalpak	Tamil film

== Television/Web ==
Title	Role	Director	Notes
Dark 7 White	ACP Abhimanyu Singh	Sattvik Mohanty	Web series released on ZEE5
Sacred Games	Deepak "Bunty" Shinde	Anurag Kashyap, Vikramaditya Motwane	Won MTV IWM 'Most Popular Supporting Actor in a Web Series' award
Cheers - Friends. Reunion. Goa.	The Bully	Sumit Saxena	
Valentine's Week ka C'Yapa	Akshay	Gibraan Noorani	
Kyunki jeena isi ka naam hai	Chandan	Toton Karmakar	
Zindagi Dot Com	Vikramjeet Singh	Dhawal Paramjit Singh and Ajay Berry	
Faujji...The Iron Man	Masood Azhar	Kishore Dang	
Khakee: The Bihar Chapter	Dilip Sahu Alias Chawanparash Sahu	Bhav Dhulia	Web series released on Netflix

== Theatre plays ==
Play	Role
Jaanch Partal	Mayor
The Seagull	Trigorin
Madhyam Vyayog	Madhyam
Kanyadaan	Arun athwale
Doctor Aap Bhi?	
All My Sons	Pradeep
Ye Shaam Ismat Aapa Ke Naam	Asgar, Raghua, narrator
Khamosh adaalat jaari hai	Samant
Jis Lahore nai vekheya o janmeya nai	Sikander Mirza
Bagiya bancha ram ki	Naukori
Ram Sajeevan ki prem katha	Kalyan kr. das
Hatyaro ki wapsi	Arun
Bas..do chamach aurat	Soldier
Samudragatha	Mental, Friend
Tein ki talwaar	Priyenath
Sandhya Chaaya	Dinu
Mattvilas	Unmattak
Veer Abhimanyu	Arjun
Gud Gobar Ganj	Chuttan
Bolti Dewaren	Waseem
Gangster Samiti	Billa Badshah
Naked Truth	Mohan
Ajnabi('I etranger – Albert Camus)	Arun
Surya ki antim kiran se surya ki pehli kiran tak	Okkak
Khidki	Writer
Hamlet	Hemant
Aadhi Si	
Dhruvswamini	Chandergupt
Maharathi	Karn
Love Ka Overdose	Azgar
