= List of Sacred Games episodes =

Episodes of Sacred Games

Sacred Games is an Indian television thriller series based on Vikram Chandra's 2006 novel of the same name. Created by Vikramaditya Motwane, the first season was directed by Motwane and Anurag Kashyap, who produced it under their banner Phantom Films. The story follows a troubled police officer, Sartaj Singh (played by Saif Ali Khan), who receives a phone call from gangster Ganesh Gaitonde (played by Nawazuddin Siddiqui); Gaitonde tells him to save the city within 25 days. The series chronicles the events that follow while tracing Gaitonde's past.

Other cast members include Radhika Apte, Girish Kulkarni, Neeraj Kabi, Geetanjali Thapa, Jeetendra Joshi, Rajshri Deshpande, Karan Wahi, Aamir Bashir, Jatin Sarna, Elnaaz Norouzi Kubra Sait, Surveen Chawla, Pankaj Tripathi, Kalki Koechlin, and Ranvir Shorey. The series was conceived after Erik Barmack, the vice-president of Netflix, contacted Motwane in 2014 to create Indian content for the platform. They opted to adapt Chandra's English novel in the Hindi language, to which Motwane agreed. Varun Grover, Smita Singh, and Vasant Nath wrote the episodes of the first season; Grover, Dhruv Narang, Nihit Bhave, and Pooja Tolani wrote the second season.

Swapnil Sonawane, Sylvester Fonseca and Aseem Bajaj served as director of photography. Aarti Bajaj was the editor and Alokananda Dasgupta composed the background score. The second season was directed by Kashyap and Neeraj Ghaywan. The first season of the series was mostly shot in Mumbai; the second season was shot over different locations of Delhi, Mombasa, Nairobi, Cape Town and Johannesburg. Each episode of Sacred Games is named after a story or character derived from Hindu mythology. The first season premiered on 5 July 2018 on Netflix and received positive reviews with particular praise on performances and writing. The second season premiered on 15 August 2019. A total of 16 episodes have aired over the two seasons with eight in each.

== Series overview ==
Series	Episodes	Originally released
1	8	6 July 2018
2	8	15 August 2019

== Episodes ==
=== Season 1 (2018) ===
No. overall	No. in season	Title	Directed by	Written by	Original release date
1	1	"Ashwathama"	Vikramaditya Motwane & Anurag Kashyap	Varun Grover	6 July 2018
Mumbai police inspector Sartaj Singh lives alone, having divorced his wife, and is disgusted by the corruption within the rest of the police force. He begins receiving calls from Ganesh Gaitonde, a wanted gangster who warns him that something destructive will happen in Mumbai within 25 days, and that everyone in the city will die except for someone named "Trivedi." Gaitonde recounts his life story to Sartaj over the calls, and claims to know Sartaj's late father, himself a policeman. Sartaj traces Gaitonde's location to a discreet safehouse, but Gaitonde shoots himself in the head when he is confronted. In flashbacks, Gaitonde speaks of having had "three fathers" along his path to becoming a criminal. The first, his biological father, was a village priest who was arrested for killing Gaitonde's mother after she was unfaithful. Entering adulthood, Gaitonde befriends Mathu, a local who helps him run a Mandrax distribution ring on the streets until the two of them begin working for Salim Kaka, a ruthless regional crime lord and Gaitonde's "second father." Gaitonde murders Kaka in front of his men during a gold smuggling operation and earns early notoriety.
2	2	"Halahala"	Vikramaditya Motwane & Anurag Kashyap	Smita Singh	6 July 2018
News of Gaitonde's death creates a stir both in the public and within Mumbai police; Sartaj's senior officer, Parulkar, is contacted by film star Zoya Mirza as well as the Hindu nationalist home minister Bipin Bhosale, both of whom share a connection with Gaitonde. Parulkar suspends Sartaj from the case for not cooperating in an internal investigation into their unit, but RAW agent Anjali Mathur enlists his continued aid in uncovering Gaitonde's operation. The two of them learn that talent manager Jojo Mascarenas, a woman found murdered by Gaitonde at his hideout, is hiding fake currency from Pakistan and was procuring famous actresses as escorts for Gaitonde. In flashbacks, Gaitonde recruits an older woman named Kanta Bai as a partner. He lands in the hospital after being beaten by a slum lord and his thugs for attempting to buy garbage disposal lands. Gaitonde's first case is registered in Kailashpada police station, and he receives a visit from Parulkar in the hospital.
3	3	"Atapi Vatapi"	Vikramaditya Motwane & Anurag Kashyap	Smita Singh	6 July 2018
Anjali finds Mathu still alive at the site of a raid on his present-day operation. However, Mathu is soon assassinated in the hospital by assassin Malcolm Mourad. Sartaj uncovers evidence from Jojo's house showing that TV actress Nayanika Sehgal was an escort for Bunty Sharma, one of Gaitonde's most trusted gang enforcers. Anjali hatches a plan to use Nayanika as bait to lure Bunty out into the open, despite Sartaj's hesitance. Zoya is seen having dinner with Parulkar. In flashbacks, Gaitonde recounts his sexual pursuit of Kukkoo, a nightclub dancer and a favorite of rival crime boss Suleiman Isa. Gaitonde additionally struggles to run a secular operation because of Bunty, a staunch Hindu with bigoted views against Muslims and a propensity for violence.
4	4	"Brahmahatya"	Vikramaditya Motwane & Anurag Kashyap	Vasant Nath	6 July 2018
Nayanika is sent into Bunty's safe house with a hidden camera, but Bunty discovers it and holds Nayanika hostage. Sartaj is intent on saving her, but Anjali instructs him to follow Bunty's trucks instead. Sartaj traces Bunty to a warehouse where the latter tries to negotiate safe passage out of India with Malcolm. Sartaj is captured, but escapes the following morning with the help of his partner, Katekar, as well as Anjali. Bunty makes a deal with Anjali promising him passage out of India in exchange for all the information he has on Gaitonde. Nayanika calls Sartaj to rescue her from Bunty's hideout; Sartaj requests permission from Parulkar, who agrees to reinstate him if Sartaj supports a fabricated story exonerating Parulkar from an internal police brutality investigation. In flashbacks, Gaitonde meets Bipin Bhosale and begins backing his political ascension, entangling with corrupt politicians and law enforcement along the way. Kukkoo is outed as transgender to Gaitonde, who still accepts her. However, that same night, Suleiman Isa's men ambush Gaitonde's home.
5	5	"Sarama"	Vikramaditya Motwane & Anurag Kashyap	Vasant Nath	6 July 2018
Sartaj enlists the aid of the police force in helping rescue Nayanika from Bunty, but the operation is botched when Nayanika herself tries to murder Bunty and is accidentally killed by a police sniper. Bunty tries to escape, but is assassinated by Malcolm. Zoya's boyfriend blackmails her into starring in his father's film, knowing she was once an escort for Gaitonde. Sartaj begrudgingly gives a statement clearing Parulkar from the internal investigation despite knowing that Parulkar shot and killed an unarmed suspect in cold blood. In flashbacks, Gaitonde and his top lieutenants survive Isa's ambush, but Kukkoo commits suicide amid the attack. Gaitonde copes with his grief by aggressively using prostitutes, but contracts a sexually transmitted infection as a result. After recovering, he agrees to get married, but Isa sends men to assassinate Paritosh, Gaitonde's close associate, on the day of the wedding. Gaitonde later decides to marry Subhadra, his housekeeper.
6	6	"Pretakalpa"	Vikramaditya Motwane & Anurag Kashyap	Smita Singh	6 July 2018
Sartaj visits his mother, who fails to provide an answer regarding his father's connection with Gaitonde. Meanwhile, Katekar finds a connection between a missing Muslim boy and a nearby theft after he is pressured to investigate the case, but one of the thieves murders him during an interrogation and escapes. Sartaj chases down the thief, who is unarmed, and shoots him dead. Zoya uses a self-inflicted injury to get her boyfriend arrested and thereby sabotage his blackmail attempt. Sartaj discovers Zoya's fake passports and her past as one of Gaitonde's escorts, while Anjali discovers a link between Gaitonde's former accountant and Malcolm Mourad. In flashbacks, Gaitonde is worn down by his depression in the wake of Paritosh's death and struggles to perform sexually. He learns that Bada Badariya, one of his close lieutenants, has been consorting with Isa, and murders both him and his brother to avenge Paritosh's death. Relieved, Gaitonde and Subhadra become intimate and have sex.
7	7	"Rudra"	Vikramaditya Motwane & Anurag Kashyap	Vasant Nath	6 July 2018
Sartaj meets with Zoya and learns that she too was told by Gaitonde shortly before his death that "everyone will die except Trivedi." Sartaj and Anjali attempt to find Trivedi, and uncover an NGO owned by Bhosale that is being used as a front to smuggle unknown cargo through trucks carrying water tanks. Sartaj boards a train carrying the tanks to find its destination, while Anjali visits an address belonging to Trivedi. However, she is ambushed and killed by Malcolm. In flashbacks, Trivedi is shown to be a follower of the mysterious Guruji, who Gaitonde calls his "third father." Bhosale introduces Gaitonde to Trivedi, but Gaitonde dismisses his vague and cryptic requests for a partnership. Isa's men raid Gaitonde's home again, and Subhadra is killed in the firefight. Gaitonde chooses to avenge her death by going on a rampage against the local Muslim community, killing innocents and burning down slums. He is eventually arrested and routinely beaten in jail by Parulkar. Gaitonde soon meets the one officer who treats him with compassion: Sartaj's father, Dilbagh Singh.
8	8	"Yayati"	Vikramaditya Motwane & Anurag Kashyap	Varun Grover	6 July 2018
Sartaj gets off the train at its destination, where he is immediately captured and brought to Malcolm, who cuts off his left thumb with an axe. Parulkar's forces soon surround the area; Malcolm escapes, but Sartaj discovers a large hangar full of crates carrying advanced weapons before collapsing from his injuries. He is hospitalized while the police interrogate an uncooperative Bhosale. Afterwards, Sartaj revisits his mother, who tells him that his father tended to Gaitonde while the latter was imprisoned. She plays a recorded video of one of Guruji's sermons where he recites the same philosophy Gaitonde told Sartaj over the phone, and Sartaj realizes the guru is Gaitonde's "third father." He returns to Gaitonde's hideout, where he discovers a nuclear shelter housing Trivedi's tortured body. In flashbacks, Gaitonde continues to be brutally beaten in prison by Parulkar, who is shown to be conspiring with Trivedi and Bhosale. Gaitonde soon reunites with his friend and early partner in crime Mathu, and receives sexual services and a knife from Zoya, originally an Afghani escort named Jamila. Gaitonde and Mathu kill several members of Isa's gang inside the prison, prompting Parulkar to lock Gaitonde in solitary confinement. Gaitonde goes for weeks without food and water, but eventually receives a call from Guruji, who promises him that he will live. A weakened Gaitonde recalls personally killing his own mother as a child. Gaitonde is soon released from solitary and gets into a second fight with Isa's men, where he is nearly killed until black-clad figures escort him out of the prison.

=== Season 2 (2019) ===
No. overall	No. in season	Title	Directed by	Written by	Original release date
9	1	"Matsya"	Neeraj Ghaywan & Anurag Kashyap	Dhruv Narang	15 August 2019
The police investigate Gaitonde's nuclear shelter and perform an autopsy on Trivedi's body. Sartaj and his fellow officer Majid Khan are recruited into a Special Investigations Team to monitor terror cells operating within Mumbai. Sartaj researches Guruji's ashram and learns that he died as recently as 2015. Malcolm sequesters Bhosale to a safehouse and interrogates Zoya to eliminate any more evidence that could link them to Gaitonde. Bhosale attempts to escape, but is caught and questioned regarding a possible nuclear attack in Mumbai. Sartaj and Majid investigate a local business printing pamphlets for Hizbuddin, an Islamic terror group led by the notorious Shahid Khan. In 1994, Gaitonde awakens on a boat far from Mumbai. He is met by Trivedi and RAW agent Kusum Devi Yadav, who explain that his operation in Mumbai is all but eliminated. They station Gaitonde in Mombasa, where he kills a local crime lord supplying weapons to Shahid Khan. In exchange, Gaitonde is given the phone number of Suleiman Isa, against whom he still wants revenge. Along the way, Gaitonde reconnects with Bunty and speaks with Jojo for the first time, where he learns she is suicidal.
10	2	"Siduri"	Neeraj Ghaywan & Anurag Kashyap	Nihit Bhave	15 August 2019
Sartaj visits Guruji's ashram, where he meets its director Batya Abelman and participates in one of her spiritual seminars. He and Majid learn from Anjali's diary that a group of Pakistanis stole nuclear fuel originating from Kenya. They connect the theft to the Hizbuddin pamphlets and are directed to a woman named Nasreen, who they find in a hospital suffering from radiation burns. In 1995, Gaitonde opens several shell companies to disrupt Isa's operations and lure him to Kenya, enlisting the aid of Mathu, Bunty and Zoya. He is soon told that Isa has arrived and prepares to kill him, but realizes he has been sent a decoy. He confronts Yadav, who says she is keeping Isa alive in order to catch Shahid Khan, who is plotting to destroy Mumbai. Gaitonde seeks advice from both Jojo and Dilbagh Singh and decides to meet Guruji. Trivedi takes him to Guruji's ashram in Croatia, where Gaitonde is immediately enamored by Guruji's sermon about returning to the Satya Yuga.
11	3	"Apasmara"	Neeraj Ghaywan & Anurag Kashyap	Pooja Tolani	15 August 2019
Sartaj and Majid learn that Nasreen accompanied two Pakistani twins, Malam and Alam, on a boat carrying an unidentified shipment to Mumbai. They track down the twins, who have also been burned by radiation, and learn of Shahid Khan's intentions to destroy the city. Additionally, Sartaj tracks down Katekar's troubled son Rohit, who has joined a street movement of Hindu nationalists. He confronts his guilt by revisiting Batya at the ashram, where the two of them take an herbal tea laced with a psychedelic substance. Sartaj later visits an aged Yadav at her daughter's home, where she is suffering from traumatic memory loss. In 1995, Gaitonde tours Guruji's ashram, whose members include Batya, Malcolm, Trivedi, Bhosale, and Dilbagh. Gaitonde meets Guruji and is given a dose of "gochi," an intense psychedelic drug manufactured by the ashram. He begins exporting the drug as another business venture, but it soon collapses. Yadav tasks Gaitonde with rooting out Shahid Khan by meeting with Isa; Gaitonde refuses, and after consulting Guruji about his fears of being forgotten, decides to produce an autobiographical film with the help of Zoya and Bunty. The film is a failure; Gaitonde attends its premiere in Mumbai, where he is caught and nearly executed by Parulkar until Yadav saves his life on the condition that he help RAW go after Shahid Khan.
12	4	"Bardo"	Neeraj Ghaywan & Anurag Kashyap	Dhruv Narang	15 August 2019
Sartaj's team learns that Malam and Alam where transporting lithium deuteride tubes to power a nuclear bomb. They investigate an online Hizbuddin chatroom in attempt to contact Shahid Khan. Outside of the investigation, Sartaj learns that his ex-wife Megha is pregnant with her new fiancée. Dejected, he visits Batya at the ashram once more, where they take a stronger dose of gochi and have sex with batya. In 1995, Gaitonde meets with Isa, who demands an Indian passport. He returns to Guruji's ashram, where he participates in a psychedelic ritual to confront his guilt over getting his father imprisoned. Zoya visits Gaitonde in Mombasa; he realizes it is a trap set by Yadav and escapes with Bunty and Mathu. Heeding Guruji's advice to seek "rebirth," Gaitonde abandons the Kenya operation and begins living at Guruji's ashram as a full-time member.
13	5	"Vikarna"	Neeraj Ghaywan & Anurag Kashyap	Nihit Bhave	15 August 2019
The police's attempts to contact Shahid Khan backfire when Khan realizes the trap and kills the two men sent to deliver him the nuclear bomb. Sartaj begins suffering withdrawal symptoms from gochi; he unsuccessfully interrogates Bhosale and is later suspended from duty when the drug is found in his blood. Majid informs Sartaj that Parulkar cleared Khan's trucks for entry into Mumbai. That night, Sartaj encounters Malcolm on the streets and chases him down. Malcolm hints at a connection between Sartaj's father and the ashram before killing himself. In flashbacks, Gaitonde becomes more embedded in Guruji's ashram, including its unhinged sexual rituals. In 2005, Guruji appoints Gaitonde as the leader of the group's journey into Satya Yuga and begins a sexual relationship with him. Yadav is shown to be in a relationship with Anjali's father, also a RAW agent; her home is raided by Malcolm, who kills Anjali's father and shoots Yadav in the head, leaving her with permanent brain damage. In 2008, Guruji finally unveils his vision of Satya Yuga to his followers: a nuclear war to sacrifice the rest of the human race.
14	6	"Azrael"	Neeraj Ghaywan & Anurag Kashyap	Pooja Tolani	15 August 2019
Sartaj confronts Batya about his father's connection with the ashram. Batya shows him proof that Dilbagh was a longtime member, and tells him about Guruji's plans of nuclear warfare in Mumbai. Sartaj reflects in solitude at a beach, but comes upon a street gang beating a Muslim boy for his religious beliefs. Sartaj spots Rohit in the crowd and attempts to break up the chaos, but the gang murders the boy and scatters. Disgusted, Sartaj returns to the ashram more convinced of their nihilistic ideology and takes another dose of gochi with Batya. By 2016, Malcolm has established inroads with Shahid Khan and Hizbuddin, who the ashram plans to use to carry out their nuclear attack. Guruji bids farewell to Gaitonde and fakes his death to the public with the ashram's help. Batya moves the ashram's operations to Mumbai. Gaitonde returns to the city as well, where he reunites with his old gang after thirteen years. He also finally meets Jojo in person; she confides her guilt over triggering her sister's suicide, and she and Gaitonde have sex. Gaitonde's return to Mumbai makes him reconsider the ashram's plans of destroying the city, and he becomes disillusioned with the cause after witnessing the bomb for himself. Batya and Malcolm forbid him from speaking to Guruji, who is being kept at the Mumbai ashram. Gaitonde stashes counterfeit money at Jojo's house and begins living in a bunker belonging to one of Bunty's old properties to hide from Malcolm's forces, knowing he will be killed for abandoning the plan.
15	7	"Torino"	Neeraj Ghaywan & Anurag Kashyap	Varun Grover	15 August 2019
Parulkar realizes he was being used by Isa, his boss, to carry out Shahid Khan's plans. He attempts to confront Bhosale, who rebuffs him. Batya tasks Sartaj with recovering the Kaal Granth, a spiritual text authored by Guruji and stolen by Gaitonde. Sartaj breaks into the police's evidence room and recovers Gaitonde's biopic film, from which he learns that "Trivedi" is also the name of Gaitonde's father. He learns from Yadav that Gaitonde's father is still alive and visits him at his village, where the man has been keeping the Kaal Granth as a parting gift from Gaitonde. Sartaj brings the book to Batya's underground bunker, where she and other followers of the ashram are taking shelter from the impending attack. Months before the attack, Guruji finally meets Gaitonde again. He guides him through an intense gochi ritual, during which a delirious Gaitonde murders Guruji and flees the ashram with the Kaal Granth in hand. Gaitonde begins hearing Guruji's voice speaking to him, and confides his delusions to Mathu. Trivedi visits Jojo demanding to know Gaitonde's whereabouts; Gaitonde calls him to meet at his bunker.
16	8	"Radcliffe"	Neeraj Ghaywan & Anurag Kashyap	Varun Grover	15 August 2019
Shahid Khan is shown to be Sartaj's cousin; his mother was separated from her sister (Sartaj's mother) during the 1947 partition between India and Pakistan. Majid's team brutally interrogates Khan's henchman for his location, while Bhosale confirms to the press that a nuclear attack will occur in Mumbai within 24 hours. A guilt-ridden Parulkar kills Bhosale before committing suicide. Sartaj experiences a vision of an apocalypse in Mumbai and decides to stop the attack, killing most of Guruji's followers in Batya's bunker before escaping. Khan activates the bomb in a parking garage as Majid's forces close in on him; Majid is killed in the ensuing shootout. Sartaj soon arrives with the Kaal Granth and uses it as a reference to find the pattern-based code to deactivate the bomb. The rest of the team evacuates the city while Sartaj makes a final attempt to stop the bomb; the screen cuts to black before the result is shown. Days before Gaitonde calls Sartaj, he meets with Trivedi at the bunker, who asks for the Kaal Granth and informs Gaitonde that the ashram has pardoned him for Guruji's murder. Trivedi is restrained after he tries twice to kill Gaitonde; he proclaims that he and the ashram were responsible for Subadhra's death and Gaitonde's subsequent imprisonment, provoking Gaitonde to beat Trivedi to death in a fit of rage. A panicked Gaitonde calls Jojo to the bunker and demands to know whether she too was affiliated with the ashram; Jojo suggests that her connection to Gaitonde was indeed engineered by Trivedi, and Gaitonde kills her when she tries to leave the bunker. Soon after, Gaitonde calls Sartaj, establishing the events of the first season. Gaitonde's own suicide is shown to have been triggered by enduring hallucinations of Guruji's voice.

== Mini Episodes ==
In association with OnePlus India, Netflix India created two mini episodes of Sacred Games as a part of the promotions for the second season.

No. overall	No. in season	Title	Original release date
1	1	"Kanta Bai"	12 August 2019
Some random boys in Kanta Bai's restaurant are making jokes of Gaitonde. One of them (Aasif Khan) says that Isa had told him to put Gaitonde in place. He jokingly asks, "Where will the God if I kill the God? Heaven or hell? Or in the garbage dumps of Gopalmath?" He then gets himself surrounded by guns of those guys to whom he was talking as well as everyone present in the bar. Kanta told him not to badmouth about God because his eyes are everywhere. Just for few drinks, the guy came to her bar and pissed off Isa's whole plan in the bar since the previous one month. He was still relieved until the time he said that he would kill the God. Kanta Bai says, "Game Over!" The drunkard tries to escape but is kept bound by the men there. Kanta Bai tells the men to transfer the guy to Bunty and the latter would be knowing what to do with the guy and she leaves. The camera zooms in Bunty's umbrella that Kanta Bai keeps on the table. In the last scene, Bai is shown sitting with swag and smoking.

No. overall	No. in season	Title	Original release date
2	2	"Malcolm"	20 August 2019
A school girl comes with a donation box and, even before she rings the bell of Malcolm's apartment, he comes out. She asks for some money as donation for Africa's relief fund. He checks for people around and gives her the money. The girl thanks him and goes. He checks his watch, closes the door and goes out. He is seen having bags and coming into an apartment when the children are playing football. Malcolm gives them the football and also some toys from his bag. He goes inside the apartment and is seen brainstorming and planning. He takes out his sniper gun and fixes it at the outside of the window. He kills the man in the next window. After the murder, he gets a message from Guruji where the latter congratulates him and gives him the next target. The target is Sartaj Singh.
