= Matsya (disambiguation) =

Matsya is the first avatar of Vishnu in Hindu mythology.

Matsya can also refer to:

- Matsya (tribe), an Indo-Aryan tribe and kingdom in ancient India
  - Matsya (kingdom), legendary kingdom based on the above in the ancient Indian epic Mahabharata
- Matsya Purana, an ancient Hindu text
- Matsya States Union, former state of India, merged into the state of Rajasthan
- "Matsya", an episode of the Indian TV series Sacred Games

== See also ==
- Matsyendranatha, a Hindu and Buddhist saint and yogi
