= Sacred Games (TV series) =

Indian crime thriller television series

- Genre: Crime; Neo-noir; Conspiracy; Thriller; Mystery
- Created by: Vikramaditya Motwane
- Based on: Sacred Games by Vikram Chandra
- Written by: Varun Grover; Vasant Nath; Smita Singh; Prakhar Sharma; Dhruv Narang; Nihit Bhave; Pooja Tolani
- Directed by: Anurag Kashyap (Seasons 1-2); Vikramaditya Motwane (Season 1); Neeraj Ghaywan (Season 2)
- Starring: Saif Ali Khan; Nawazuddin Siddiqui; Radhika Apte; Pankaj Tripathi; Kalki Koechlin; Ranvir Shorey; Aamir Bashir
- Theme music composer: Alokananda Dasgupta
- Composers: Songs: Phenom; Divine; Rachita Arora; Background score: Alokananda Dasgupta
- Country of origin: India
- Original language: Hindi
- No. of seasons: 2
- No. of episodes: 16 (list of episodes)

Production
- Executive producers: Kelly Luegenbiehl; Erik Barmack; Vikramaditya Motwane; Vikram Chandra; Anurag Kashyap⁣; Varun Grover⁣
- Production location: India
- Cinematography: Swapnil S. Sonawane; Sylvester Fonseca; Aseem Bajaj
- Editor: Aarti Bajaj
- Running time: 43–58 minutes
- Production companies: Phantom Films; Reliance Entertainment

Original release
- Network: Netflix
- Release: 6 July 2018 – 15 August 2019

Sacred Games is an Indian Hindi-language neo-noir crime thriller television series based on Vikram Chandra's 2006 novel of the same name. Produced and directed by Vikramaditya Motwane and Anurag Kashyap under the banner of Phantom Films, it is India's first Netflix original series. The novel was adapted by Varun Grover, Smita Singh, and Vasant Nath. Kelly Luegenbiehl, Erik Barmack and Motwane were the series' executive producers.

The series follows Sartaj Singh (Saif Ali Khan), a troubled police officer in Mumbai who receives a phone call from gangster Ganesh Gaitonde (Nawazuddin Siddiqui), warning him to save the city within 25 days. As the series unfolds, it chronicles the intense events that follow this ominous call. Other cast members include Radhika Apte, Girish Kulkarni, Neeraj Kabi, Jeetendra Joshi, Rajshri Deshpande, Karan Wahi, Sukhmani Sadana, Aamir Bashir, Jatin Sarna, Elnaaz Norouzi, Pankaj Tripathi, Amey Wagh, Kubbra Sait, Surveen Chawla, Kalki Koechlin, Ranvir Shorey, Vikram Kochar and Amruta Subhash.

Sacred Games began development after Netflix vice-president Erik Barmack asked Motwane in 2014 to create Indian content for the platform. They decided to adapt Chandra's novel in Hindi. After a script was completed, Motwane asked Kashyap to co-direct; Motwane directed the scenes with Singh, and Kashyap directed Gaitonde's scenes. Swapnil Sonawane was director of photography for Motwane; Sylvester Fonseca and Aseem Bajaj filmed the scenes directed by Kashyap. In the second season, Motwane reduced his involvement to showrunner and was replaced as director by Neeraj Ghaywan. Aarti Bajaj was the editor, and Alokananda Dasgupta composed the background score.

The first season of Sacred Games consisting of eight episodes was released on Netflix on 6 July 2018 in 191 countries. The series is subtitled in over 20 languages. It received mostly critical acclaim from critics, with particular praise for its performances and writing. The first season is the only Indian series to appear on The New York Times' "The 30 Best International TV Shows of the Decade" list. The second season premiered on 15 August 2019, met with a mixed response.

== Overview ==
Sartaj Singh is a troubled Mumbai Police inspector who seeks validation from a police force he hates for its corruption. He receives a phone call from Ganesh Gaitonde, a notorious crime lord who has been missing for 16 years. He tells Sartaj to save the city in 25 days, beginning a chain of events that burrows deep into India's underworld. On his journey, Sartaj is helped by Research and Analysis Wing (RAW) officer Anjali Mathur; flashbacks detail Gaitonde's origins, and how he became Mumbai's crime lord. The first season follows Sartaj as he tries to uncover clues about Gaitonde's past and learns about a connection between Gaitonde and his father.

In season two, Gaitonde's story continues in flashbacks while Sartaj tries to find answers. Sartaj discovers an ashram to which his father once belonged, and learns about their apocalyptic plans to create a new, conflict-free world. Gaitonde's meeting with Khanna Guruji, how he became part of the ashram, and his activities with them are depicted in flashbacks. Also explored is how Gaitonde was deployed in Kenya by Kusum Devi Yadav – a RAW officer who tries to keep Gaitonde's archenemy Suleiman Isa alive so she can capture and kill Shahid Khan, a dangerous extremist who turns out to be Sartaj's cousin and harbors a plan (with the ashram) to wipe out India.

== Cast ==
Actor	Character	Seasons	
Actor	Character	1	2
Saif Ali Khan	Inspector Sartaj Singh	Main	Main
Nawazuddin Siddiqui	Ganesh Gaitonde	Main	Main
Radhika Apte	Anjali Mathur	Main	
Pankaj Tripathi	Khanna Guruji	Recurring	Main
Kalki Koechlin	Batya Abelman		Main
Ranvir Shorey	Shahid Khan		Main
Neeraj Kabi	DCP Dilip Parulkar	Recurring	Recurring
Jatin Sarna	Deepak "Bunty" Shinde	Recurring	Recurring
Kubra Sait	Kukoo	Recurring	
Jitendra Joshi	Constable Ashok Katekar	Recurring	
Rajshri Deshpande	Subhadra	Recurring	
Elnaaz Norouzi	Zoya Mirza/Jamila	Recurring	Recurring
Luke Kenny	Malcolm Mourad	Recurring	Recurring
Aamir Bashir	Inspector Majid Ali Khan	Recurring	Recurring
Geetanjali Thapa	Nayanika Sehgal	Recurring	
Surveen Chawla	Jojo Mascarenas	Recurring	Recurring
Shalini Vatsa	Kanta Bai	Recurring	Recurring
Amruta Subhash	Kusum Devi Yadav		Recurring
Girish Kulkarni	Bipin Bhosale	Recurring	Recurring
Anupriya Goenka	Megha Singh	Recurring	Recurring
Affan Khan	Young Sartaj Singh	Recurring	Recurring
Sunny Pawar	Young Ganesh Gaitonde	Recurring	Recurring
Danish Pandor	Bada Badariya	Recurring	Recurring
Anil Mange	Chota Badariya	Recurring	Recurring
Vikram Kochar	Mathu	Recurring	Recurring
Samir Kochhar	ACIO Markand	Recurring	Recurring
Chittaranjan Tripathy	Trivedi	Recurring	Recurring
Rajendra Shisatka	ASI Dhobale	Recurring	Recurring
Sukhmani Sadana	Mikki	Recurring	Recurring
Muni Jha	Paritosh Shah	Recurring	
Karan Wahi	Karan Malhotra	Recurring	
Karan Veer Mehra	Rajeev Chawla		Recurring
Rajveer Singh Rajput	Raw Agent	Recurring	
Nawab Shah	Salim Kaka	Recurring	
Saanand Verma	Purushottam Baria		Recurring
Jaipreet Singh	Constable Dilbagh Singh	Recurring	Recurring
Saurabh Sachdeva	Suleiman Isa	Recurring	Recurring
Neha Shitole	Shalini Katekar	Recurring	Recurring
Smita Tambe	ATS Analyst Rama		Recurring
Harshita Gaur	Mary Mascarenas		Recurring
Priyanka Setia	Harsha Baria		Recurring
Sandesh Kulkarni	Gaitonde's Father	Recurring	Recurring
Vibhavari Deshpande	Gaitonde's Mother	Recurring	
Joy Sengupta	Mathur		Recurring
Amey Wagh	Kushal		Recurring
Jaimin Panchal	Gaitonde's Brother		Recurring
Sharik Khan	Vikash		Recurring

== Episodes ==
Series	Episodes	Originally released
1	8	6 July 2018
2	8	15 August 2019

== Production ==
=== Development ===
Netflix vice-president Erik Barmack came across Sacred Games, Vikram Chandra's 2006 crime novel, while the service was searching for Indian content for a global audience. Barmack called it "an interesting property", and decided to adapt it in Hindi. In 2014, Netflix approached Phantom Films to produce a series; writer-director Vikramaditya Motwane met their team during a visit to Los Angeles. Motwane had read Chandra's earlier novel, Love and Longing in Bombay, which introduces the character of Sartaj Singh. After the meeting, he read Sacred Games and thought it was "great". Motwane said that the best thing for him was that Netflix wanted to produce the series in Hindi, rather than English: "Speaking in English can seem so fake at times." He started working on the adaptation with writer Varun Grover, calling the writing process the "biggest challenge".

Motwane found the web-series medium "liberating", since he could tell stories which "don't have to be told in two-and-a-half hours with an interval and three songs inserted into it." Although he initially considered using different directors for each episode, "As we got closer to production, we realised that dates were clashing and that it was an overall nightmare [...]" Motwane suggested that he and Anurag Kashyap co-direct the series, since he felt that the two "distinct voices" were essential for the two parallel tracks of the plot. Kashyap said that he "gobbled" up the opportunity as the novel had fascinated him. In 2014, he was approached by AMC and Scott Free Productions to direct an English-language adaptation of the novel. Kashyap declined, since he did not want to do "anything based in India in English". Motwane and his writers gave the scripts to Chandra for feedback: "Chandra is so research-intensive that we didn't have to approach another researcher, we just had to ask him questions." The series was written by Grover, Smita Singh, and Vasant Nath. Singh said that in 2016, they were told by Phantom Films that "it had to be a gripping slow-burner". Research was directed by Smita Nair and Mantra Watsa, who summarised every chapter and made the "complex plot easily accessible" to the writers. The series' script was completed in a year. Nath said that in the beginning of the writing process, they were "chucking away some important characters from the original, and bringing in new ones". Sacred Games is Netflix' first Indian original series.

Its episode titles were inspired by Hindu mythology. The first episode, "Aswatthama", was based on the namesake character from the Mahabharata who was cursed with immortality by Krishna after the Kurukshetra War. In the series, Gaitonde calls himself immortal (like Ashwatthama) before he commits suicide. "Halahala", the second episode, was named after a poison created from the churning of the sea. Aatapi and Vatapi were two demons who tricked people with their nice behavior and killed them. Brahmahatya (the killing of a brahmin) is a crime in Hinduism. In that episode, the Hindu Gaitonde agrees to attract Muslim votes for the Hindu politician Bhosale. "Sarama" refers to as a dog. "Pretakalpa" refers to a Hindu text read at a funeral. In this episode, Katekar is killed and Sartaj cremates him. Rudra is the angry version of Shiva. Gaitonde's wife Subhadra is killed in this episode, and he takes revenge by murdering her killers. Yayati was a king who was cursed with premature old age. The series' title sequence, logo, and title designs were designed by graphic designer Aniruddh Mehta and the Mumbai-based motion lab Plexus, who were inspired by Hindu mythology. Mehta said that each emblem was a contemporary take on "stories from ancient Hindu scriptures, mandalas, mixing modern design elements with characters from the Indus Valley Civilization". The sequence also featured real footages of several events such as the demolition of the Babri Masjid.

Several changes were made in adapting the novel as a series. Kukoo, a transgender woman, is mentioned in passing in the novel as a dancer with whom a police officer fell in love; a constable describes Kukoo to Sartaj as "beautiful as a Kashmiri apple". In the series, Kukoo is a prominent character as Gaitonde's love interest; Malcolm Murad, mentioned once in the novel, has a prominent role in the series as an assassin. A few other changes were made in the adaptation. The Bombay riots are prominent in the novel; in the series, they are briefly described by Gaitonde.

=== Casting and characters ===
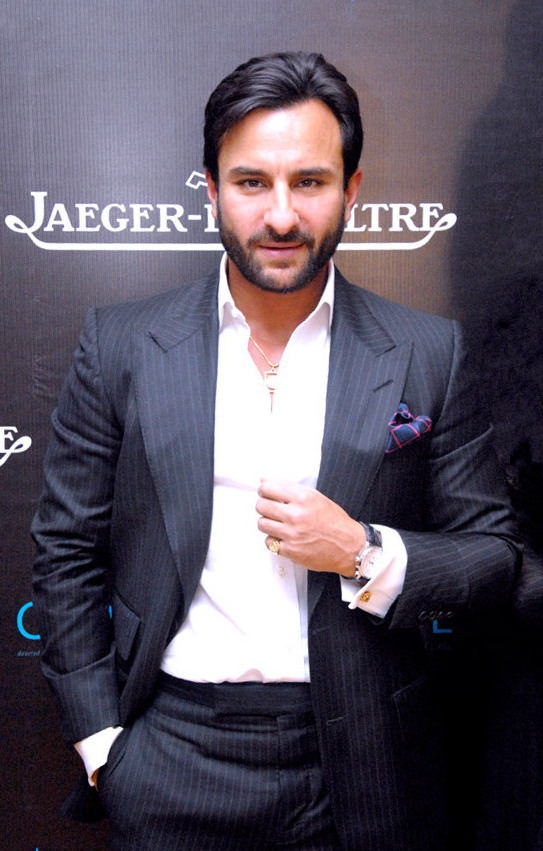
The series was Saif Ali Khan's first venture into television.

Several characters in the series speak different Indian languages (Hindi, Marathi, Punjabi and Gujarati), and Kashyap cited that as giving a "real sense of what India is". Saif Ali Khan, who plays the cop Sartaj Singh, called the series an experiment, and said he agreed to do it because "people are willing to watch programmes from other countries with sub-titles because good stories transcend boundaries." Khan found an "interesting arc" in Singh, calling the character "troubled and honest". He said that he read portions of the novel, but stopped when he found that it was not helping him find what he needed as an actor. Radhika Apte played Research and Analysis Wing (RAW) officer Anjali Mathur. Apte called her character a "completely no-nonsense, focused woman who's highly respected in her field and by her peers." She said that her character was not glamourised (unlike Hindi film depictions of a RAW agent). Kashyap said that the novel is about "how Bombay became Mumbai", and the series gives "a sense of the city, where it came from and where it is today."

Nawazuddin Siddiqui said that he treated his role as a gangster like a human being. Siddiqui felt that a series provides more time for character exploration than a film, and wanted to try the format. He called Gaitonde the most complex character he had played to date. Khan read Chandra's short story, "Kama", to "delve into his character's angst." Sartaj Singh's appearance was changed from tall and thin in the novel to muscular and heavier in the series. According to Khan, the change was made to make the character look "visually engaging" and a "slightly more charged-up version of the passive officer in the books". Kashyap called Gaitonde the "sum of all we like in movie characters." Motwane said that Siddiqui was his first choice to play Gaitonde because he "plays gangster so well" and "has that aura and almost everything that's required to play a gangster." He said that casting popular actors like Khan and Siddiqui "drives a larger audience to watch." He said that it was easier to convince Apte and Neeraj Kabi for the roles after Khan and Siddiqui were cast. Kabi was cast as DCP Parulkar, whom he researched in the novel. He also worked on the superintendent's body language, which was noted in the novel. Jitendra Joshi played Constable Ashok Katekar, Sartaj's colleague, after auditioning for the role. He was inspired by real-life police officers for his portrayal.

Actress Kubbra Sait played Kukoo, a transgender woman. She was asked to audition by Kashyap at the screening of Mukkabaaz at the MAMI Film Festival, and was cast. Sait felt that the lack of any reference for Kukoo's role made it "the most challenging experience" of her career; she wore a prosthetic penis. Jatin Sarna was cast as gangster Deepak "Bunty" Shinde after auditioning. Rajshri Deshpande played Gaitonde's wife, Subhadra. Girish Kulkarni was originally offered the role of Katekar; he declined because he wanted a character "that would figure in both Sartaj and Ganesh Gaitonde's world", and was then cast as minister Bipin Bhosale. Iranian actress Elnaaz Norouzi was cast as film star Zoya Mirza. Production design was by Shazia Iqbal and Vintee Bansal, and Aarti Bajaj edited the series. Swapnil S. Sonawane filmed the portions directed by Motwane, and Sylvester Fonseca and Aseem Bajaj shot Kashyap's portions. Anish John was the series' sound designer.

=== Filming ===
==== Season 1 ====
Motwane began filming in September 2017. Kashyap started filming after the Mukkabaaz (2017) was completed, and finished shooting in January 2018. Motwane and Kashyap filmed separately; Motwane directed the present-day scenes with Khan, and Kashyap filmed 1980s Bombay with Siddiqui. Motwane called the separate filming an "experiment", and Kashyap found it "painfully difficult" to find "pockets of Bombay which has kept itself like it is". Chandra was working on the novel while Kashyap was working on his film, Black Friday (2007), and he "knew the real-life parallels" in the novel. Kashyap said that he shot the series as he would a film. Motwane said that except for omitting small details, they "stuck to the spirit of the book". He tried to balance the series, "making it for a worldwide audience [and not alienating] everybody over here." Motwane said that he enjoyed telling a story without being confined to a three-act structure. Chandra served as a script consultant in the series.

Sacred Games was shot in several Mumbai locations, including the Byculla neighbourhood, and Motwane said that its period setting presented a "huge logistical challenge". Although the time period of Gaitonde's story remained unchanged, the present-day narrative was shifted to the present from the early 2000s. Motwane said that there is a "similar sort of government [today] and the vibes are the same, so the threat felt a lot more present". According to Sonawane, "A lot of changes happened on the shoot". Several shots in the script, such as the introduction of Gaitonde as a child, were top-angle shots. He filmed Sartaj Singh's scenes with "worn-out but very warm lenses that reflect how nothing is working out in Sartaj's life." The color yellow was used in Gaitonde's scenes to signify that the "guru that he has begun to follow." Bajaj shot for 27 days, leaving when he became involved in another project; Fonseca shot the remaining scenes, using spherical lenses to "demarcate" the world. The shootout at Gaitonde's house was filmed at three locations, with long takes on Steadicam and hand-held cameras. A scene with Sait, involving frontal nudity, was filmed in seven takes.

==== Season 2 ====
In September 2018, it was announced that the series had been renewed for a second season. A 58-second teaser promoting the season premiered on 21 September. Kashyap continued to direct, and Neeraj Ghaywan replaced Motwane as co-director. Pankaj Tripathi and Surveen Chawla, seen briefly during the first season, returned in larger roles. Kalki Koechlin, Ranvir Shorey and Amruta Subhash joined the series, and Chawla filmed while she was pregnant. Shooting began in November 2018, with Siddiqui filming his scenes in Nairobi and Khan filming his in Mumbai. It was shot on a 50-day schedule, Ghaywan filming with Khan. The season was extensively filmed in Mombasa, Cape Town and Johannesburg. Shooting ended on 19 February 2019, and the season premiered on 15 August of that year. In 2020, Siddiqui said that there might not be a third season.

=== Music ===
Sacred Games

Soundtrack album by Alokananda Dasgupta, Divine, Phenom, Rachita Arora, and Yashraj Jaiswal
- Released: 2018
- Recorded: 2017
- Genre: Soundtrack
- Length: 52:41
- Label: Netflix
- Producers: Alokananda Dasgupta; Phenom

Alokananda Dasgupta chronology
Breathe (2018)	Sacred Games (2018)	Leila (2019)

Divine chronology
One Side (2018)	Sacred Games (2018)	Roots (2018)

Phenom chronology
Phenom (2017)	Sacred Games (2018)

Rachita Arora chronology
Mukkabaaz (2018)	Sacred Games (2018)	Karenjit Kaur - The Untold Story of Sunny Leone (2018)

The soundtrack of the TV series Sacred Games consists of 24 tracks including seven songs and other scores. One song "Kaam 25" sung and written by rapper Divine and music by the producer Phenom, was released on 21 June 2018. It was not used in the series. According to Sidhantha Jain of Firstpost, the song is a "hard-hitting, hypnotic Mumbai anthem inspired by the streets." One of Divine's earlier song "Jungli Sher", was also used in the series' trailer. The background score and the opening theme was composed by Alokananda Dasgupta and Yashraj Jaiswal. She also composed four songs in it: "Saiyaan", "Tabahi", "Dhuaan Dhuaan" and "Kukoo's Couplet". Both Dasgupta and Motwane came up with the idea that the theme "should have a religious connotation but it shouldn't remind one of any particular religion". She then created gibberish lines after deciding to include an ominous chant by humming with a vocalist to record with a cello. Rachita Arora composed two tracks of the album, "Dance Capital" and "Labon Se Chhukar." She was briefed by Kashyap to listen to the songs of Bappi Lahiri to get a "sense of the infectious rhythm that defined his music." The Music Production of the songs were done by Daniel Chiramal and the lyrics for the songs were written by Rajeshwari Dasgupta, Prakhar Mishra Varunendra, Vishal Sawant and Rajeshwari Deshpande.

==== Track listing ====
Track listing
No.	Title	Lyrics	Music	Singer(s)	Length
1.	"Intro"		Alokananda Dasgupta	Instrumental	0:22
2.	"Main Theme Music"		Alokananda Dasgupta	Instrumental	2:50
3.	"Dhuan Dhuan"	Rajeshwari Dasgupta	Alokananda Dasgupta	Pallavi Roy, Mamta Singh	2:57
4.	"Labbon Se Chhukar"	Prakhar Mishra Varunendra	Rachita Arora	Jyotica Tangri	2:52
5.	"Disco Capital"	Prakhar Mishra Varunendra	Rachita Arora	Shivi	2:53
6.	"Disco In The Night"	Vishal Sawant	Alokananda Dasgupta	Shalmali Kholgade	2:54
7.	"Kukoo's Couplet"	Rajeshwari Dasgupta	Alokananda Dasgupta	Alokananda Dasgupta	1:30
8.	"Tabahi"	Rajeshwari Deshpande	Alokananda Dasgupta	Mamta Singh	2:46
9.	"Theme Episode 1"		Alokananda Dasgupta	Instrumental	2:53
10.	"Sartaj's Agony"		Alokananda Dasgupta	Instrumental	0:45
11.	"Katekar Theme"		Alokananda Dasgupta	Instrumental	0:55
12.	"The Finale"		Alokananda Dasgupta	Instrumental	2:12
13.	"Sartaj Theme"		Alokananda Dasgupta	Instrumental	1:12
14.	"I Am Ashwatthama"		Alokananda Dasgupta	Instrumental	1:36
15.	"Saiyyan"	Rajeshwari Dasgupta	Alokananda Dasgupta	Pallavi Roy, Shibani Sur	1:55
16.	"Gaitonde was free"		Alokananda Dasgupta	Instrumental	1:36
17.	"Zoya's Two- Face"		Alokananda Dasgupta	Instrumental	1:35
18.	"Consignment"		Alokananda Dasgupta	Instrumental	1:29
19.	"Save Her"		Alokananda Dasgupta	Instrumental	1:03
20.	"You Will Be Back"		Alokananda Dasgupta	Instrumental	1:45
21.	"Am I Man or God"		Alokananda Dasgupta	Instrumental	1:12
22.	"Conspiracy"		Alokananda Dasgupta	Instrumental	0:49
23.	"The Chase"		Alokananda Dasgupta	Instrumental	1:42
24.	"Kaam 25"	Divine	Divine, Phenom	Divine	2:41

==== Music videos ====
Netflix released the music video of the track "Kaam 25" on YouTube featuring Divine.

== Release ==
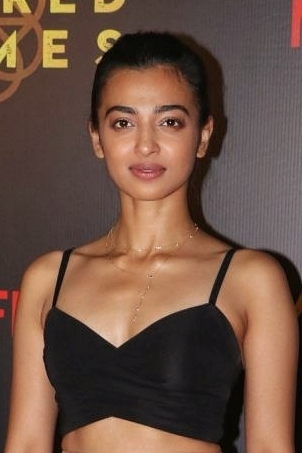
Radhika Apte at the series' Mumbai screening

Sacred Games is the first Netflix original series from India. The service announced three new series and four others in February 2018, for a total of seven Indian series in production. A preview of the main three characters (Sartaj, Gaitonde and Anjali Mathur) was released by Netflix on 23 February 2018, with photos of a blood-spattered Sartaj, a perplexed-looking Mathur and a pyjama-clad Gaitonde. A 45-second teaser video was released on 3 May, followed by a trailer on 6 June. The series' first four episodes premiered in Mumbai on 29 June 2018 at the MAMI film festival. Netflix released the series on 5 July in 191 countries, subtitled in over 20 languages. Related mashup videos, artwork and memes circulated on social media after the series' release.

On 10 July 2018, Indian National Congress member Rajeev Kumar Sinha filed a first information report against Netflix, the showrunners and Nawazuddin Siddiqui for allegedly insulting former Indian Prime Minister Rajiv Gandhi in one scene. Another complaint was lodged the following day by Youth Indian National Trade Union Congress city wing and All Indian Cine Worker's Association president (and Congress Party activist) Suresh Shyamal Gupta for allegedly insulting Gandhi. On 14 July 2018, Rahul Gandhi tweeted that freedom "is a fundamental democratic right. My father lived and died in the service of India. The views of a character on a fictional web series can never change that." The following day, Sinha withdrew his complaint after Gandhi's tweet. However, Netflix refused to change the objectionable English subtitle.

According to Netflix vice-president Todd Yellin, its first season was watched by twice as many people outside India.

== Reception ==
=== Critical response ===
The series received positive reviews from critics, who praised its performances. On Rotten Tomatoes, season 1 has an approval rating of 92% based on reviews from 26 critics. On Rotten Tomatoes, season 2 has an approval rating of 60% based on reviews from 5 critics.

According to Raja Sen, "It is not an immediately explosive concept, unfolding more like a thriller by numbers, helped along by strong performances and some nimble direction." Jai Arjun Singh said that Sacred Games replicated the novel's profanity, and the "series uses its own methods to stress the idea of religion as something that can be both nurturing and cannibalistic". Ektaa Malik of The Indian Express called the series "edgier and more layered": "For those who have read the original source material — the novel Sacred Games — they might find the series a bit jarring with regards to certain plot developments." Manjusha Radhakrishnan of Gulf News called it an "edgy, thrilling winner", with Khan and Siddiqui in "top form". Saibal Chatterjee of NDTV gave it a positive review: "The series has the potential to wean back viewers who have been driven away from television by drab soap operas and trite entertainment formats."

Dipti Kharude of The Quint praised the series' writing: "What's commendable is that Sacred Games chooses compassion over glorification." Swetha Ramakrishnan of Firstpost called it a "high benchmark for India's first Netflix original", and the show provided "due diligence with high production value and an investment into the right parameters – writing, acting and direction." According to Shristi Negi of News18, the series "totally grips you from start to finish". Ankur Pathak of HuffPost also gave it a positive review: "At the surface, Sacred Games appears to be a standard cat-and-mouse chase but the show's probing, introspective nature turns a clichéd crime-saga to a biting commentary on the zeitgeist. Its relevance to our current moment cannot be overstated."

Tim Goodman of The Hollywood Reporter wrote that "there are clear flaws", but "there's something riveting about India's bleaker, darker heart being exposed as opposed to some upbeat, colorful explosion of dance scenes". Mike Hale of The New York Times was less enthusiastic: "Despite its verve and visual inventiveness, the series feels muddled and a little wearying at times". Adam Starkey of Metro, however, wrote that the dual narratives are occasionally jarring but compelling nonetheless. Taylor Antrim called the series "mesmerizing" and "addictive": "Bollywood maximal-ism meets downbeat Euro noir meets Hollywood gangster epic". Steve Greene of IndieWire called the series a "surface-level telling of a story that wants to have so much more in its grasp" and noted its violence. John Doyle of The Globe and Mail wrote that the series "sprawls from thriller to dense character study to brooding meditation on the roots of India's political corruption." However, some elements of the story "will puzzle viewers not familiar with India's tangled religious tensions and caste system." Kaitlin Reily of Refinery29 called Sacred Games a "juicy crime thriller that combines a hard-boiled detective story with magical realism." Lincoln Michel of GQ called it the "best Netflix original in years."

The second season received less-favorable reviews than the first, with Tanul Thakur of The Wire writing that it "severely lacks the urgency, the wicked humour and the heartfelt bonds that made the first season so captivating." According to Shreya Iyer of The Times of India, the series "falls short on several levels and is unable to live up to the hype created by the previous season." Kaushani Banerjee of The New Indian Express wrote, "There seems to be a lack of effort or failure to bring newness to the characters which became iconic after the first season was aired." Soumya Rao of Scroll.in called the season "too ambitious for its own good".

== Accolades ==
Sacred Games received the Best Drama Award at the News18 iReel Awards. It received five awards from 11 nominations, including Best Actor (Drama) for Nawazuddin Siddiqui, Best Supporting Actor for Jitendra Joshi, Best Writing (Drama), Best Ensemble Cast, and Best Series (Drama). Kashyap received the Best Direction (Fiction) Award and Aarti Bajaj received the Award for Best Editing at the inaugural Asian Academy Creative Awards. It received the Best Show Jury (Web) and Best Supporting Actor (Web) Award for Kabi, at the 18th Indian Television Academy Awards. The second season was nominated for a 2019 Best Drama International Emmy Award. Sait garnered the OTT Best Female Actor in Negative Role Award at the 2019 Gold Awards. Alokananda Dasgupta received the Best Background Music Award while Slyvester Fonseca received the Best Cinematographer Award at the 2020 Filmfare OTT Awards. It is the only Indian series on The New York Times' "30 Best International TV Shows of the Decade" list.
