= Poonam (2020 film) =

- Directed by: Sanjay Sanwal
- Written by: Sanjay Sanwal
- Produced by: Shilpi Das Chohan
- Starring: Rajit Kapur, Meeta Vashisht
- Release date: October 2020
- Running time: 16 minutes
- Country: India
- Language: English

Poonam is a 2020 Indian English-language short drama film directed by Sanjay Sanwal and produced by Shilpi Das Chohan. Starring Rajit Kapur and Meeta Vashisht, the 16-minute social-issue film focuses on the emotional plight, loneliness, and need for companionship among senior citizens.

== Cast ==
- Rajit Kapur as Suraj
- Meeta Vashisht as Poonam

== Plot ==
The film centers on two senior citizens, Suraj (Rajit Kapur) and Poonam (Meeta Vashisht). Poonam is a warm, passionate woman determined to live life on her own terms, while Suraj is a retired man who dedicated his life to his family as a husband and father. Despite fulfilling their social and familial responsibilities, both characters find themselves abandoned and isolated due to changing family dynamics and children relocating. Reconnecting at a later stage in life, the duo navigates their shared loneliness, highlighting that psychological well-being and companionship are integral components of holistic health in old age.

== Production ==
The concept originated around 2015 when voice artiste and producer Shilpi Das Chohan visited various old-age homes and retirement communities. Observing widespread social isolation across different socio-economic backgrounds, Chohan collaborated with Anil Kumar P of Epicreel to address elderly mental health through cinema. The script was finalized after two years of research into elder care dynamics.

The production faced initial casting hurdles as an independent project centered on senior care. Rajit Kapur signed on after connecting with the script's theme, joining Meeta Vashisht in the lead roles. Principal photography took place over four days in Nainital, Uttarakhand, the hometown of director Sanjay Sanwal. Scenes featuring the lead actors were completed in two days.

Post-production experienced delays due to re-edits, funding constraints, and industry disruptions during the COVID-19 pandemic. Editing was finalized in October 2020 prior to entering the international film festival circuit.

== Awards ==
Year	Award / Festival	Category	Recipient	Result
2020	7th Art Independent International Film Festival	Best Short Film	Poonam	Won
2020	7th Art Independent International Film Festival	Best Actor (Short Film)	Rajit Kapur	Won
2020	7th Art Independent International Film Festival	Best Actress (Short Film)	Meeta Vashisht	Won
2020	Uruvatti International Film Festival	Jury Award	Poonam	Won
2020	Lake City International Film Festival	Award of Recognition	Poonam	Won
2020	Accolade Global Film Competition	Award of Recognition	Poonam	Won
2020	Silk Road Film Awards Cannes	Official Selection	Poonam	Nominated
