= Space City Sigma =

- Genre: Science fiction
- Written by: Ashok Talwar
- Directed by: Ashok Talwar; Bizeth Bannerjee
- Starring: Kishore Dang; Krishna Kant; Savita Bhatia; Mita Vashisht
- Original language: Hindi
- No. of seasons: 1

Original release
- Network: DD National
- Release: 21 May 1989

Space City Sigma (Shortened to Sigma) is a foundational Indian science fiction television series that premiered on the DD National channel on 21 May 1989. Along with Indradhanush, it was one of the first science fiction series produced in India. The series was edited by Ashok Talwar and directed by Ashok Talwar and Bizeth Bannerjee, and produced by Studio Efekt.

The series was Inspired by English Language Sci-Fi Series Like Star Trek, and Project UFO, that had aired on DD National in the years leading up to its creation, slongside popular movies like Star Wars.

The show was serialized consisting of at least 21 episodes although possibly more were produced at around 20 minutes long. Between 1997-1998 It was re-broadcast on DD national alongside new Indian Scifi Series Captain Vyom. But today most of the series is considered lost media. Over several months in 2026 10 episodes were uploaded to Youtube, no complete story exists.

Ashok Talwar, one of the original creators has said when posting episodes on Youtube: "We are also trying for a sequel to Sigma. It would be a good idea for people to write to Doordarshan/Prasarbharti to support our proposal."

== Plot ==
Sigma is a space city which is running on fusion energy and is docked on the Galactic frontier. It is the last stand for the humans against the technologically advanced race of aliens who are ruled by Zhakhakoo.

of all the episodes one in particular is remembered fondly:

The story starts when a strange and deadly creature boards the human galactic ship. It is shown that it is the latest tactic of Zhakhakoo to defeat Commander Tara and take control over the city. Commander Tara's city is the last obstacle for Zhakhakoo and his plan to add earth to his astronomical kingdom and the universe. For his latest quest to conquer the city Zhakhakoo has sent a Blob for the mission.

Blob is a strange creature he jumps on unsuspecting target and sucks all the life force out of them. Blob has the ability to kill any person whom he touches. He starts killings innocent people of the space city. The people of the city are unable to find the reasons for the deaths. The word of the deaths, spread through the city like wild fire and causes mayhem and chaos throughout the city. Through this chaos, Blob is able to get close to Shakti who is the head of security of the city. Shakti falls into the trap created by Blob thus giving Blob an opportunity to attack Shakti. Blob uses his power of killing people and attach himself on Shakti's face. Blob uses all his strength to make sure that Shakti is killed, and Shakti too looks like on the verge of dying himself. There is a struggle between the two to defeat each other in the battle.

As the battle continues, it is shown that Blob in eager to kill Shakti forgets that he is a cyborg and Blob has attached himself to the metal side of his face by which it is impossible to kill Shakti. Before Blob realises his mistake Shakti overpowered Blob. Blob has no chance of standing against Shakti. Shakti uses all his strength and kills Blob and saves Sigma space city. The news of Blob's failure reaches the ears of Zhakhakoo and he gets frustrated at the fact that he gets defeated again.

== Characters ==
- Varey (Kishore Dang), The engineer
- Commander Tara (Krishan Kant), The leader of Sigma
- Shakti (Sanjeev Puri), The cyborg head of security
- Heeri (Savita Bhatia), The communication officer
- Teeba (Mita Vashisht), The scientist
- Dr. Luka (Anand Sharma), The doctor
- Zakhaaku (Shailendra Srivastava), The main antagonist
- Mukamba, Zakhaaku's assistant

== See also ==
- Captain Vyom
- Aryamaan - Brahmaand Ka Yodha
