= Nitin Chauhaan =

Indian television actor (1988–2024)

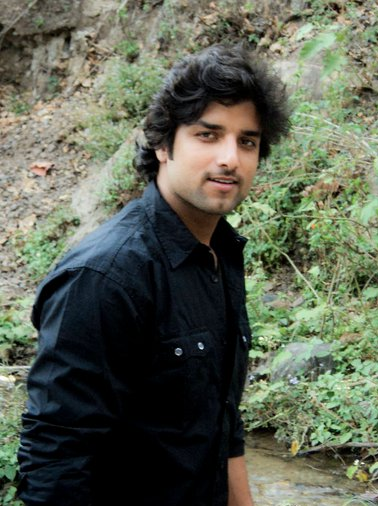
- Chauhaan in 2016
- Born: 11 November 1988; Aligarh, Uttar Pradesh, India
- Died: 7 November 2024 (aged 35); Mumbai, India
- Occupation: Television actor
- Years active: 2008–2024
- Known for: Dadagiri (season 2); MTV Splitsvilla (season 5)

Nitin Chauhaan (11 November 1988 - 7 November 2024) was an Indian television actor known for his roles in shows such as Zindagi Dot Com, Crime Patrol, and Friends. He also participated in reality shows, including the 5th season of MTV Splitsvilla and Dadagiri.

== Early life & Career ==
Nitin was born in Aligarh, Uttar Pradesh. He was an actor and a fitness enthusiast. He won the TV reality show Dadagiri (season 2) aired on Bindaas channel in 2009. After getting recognition as a winner on the show, he was seen acting in the TV shows such as Zindagi Dot Com, Crime Patrol and Friends. His most recent appearance was in the TV show Tera Yaar Hoon Main.

== Personal life ==
Chauhaan was married and had a daughter.

== Death ==
He died by suicide at his residence in Mumbai on 7 November 2024, at the age of 35.

== Filmography ==
=== Television ===
Year	Television	Role	Notes
2009	Dadagiri (season 2)		Winner
2012	MTV Splitsvilla (season 5)		Contestant
2014	Zindagi Dot Com	Ranbeer	Fiction
2014	Friends: Conditions Apply	Murli	27 episodes
2015	Crime Patrol	Sachin Deshpandey	1 episode
2015	Gumrah: End of Innocence	Suresh Patil	Chapter 2, Episode 18
2016	SuperCops Vs Super Villains	Jogi Sikander	
2016	Savdhaan India	Amit	Episode 1718
