= Saat Uchakkey =

2016 film by Sanjeev Sharmaa

- Theatrical release poster
- Directed by: Sanjeev Sharma
- Written by: Sanjeev Sharma (dialogues) Lyricists Ameer khusro Sahil Sultanpuri; Kumaar
- Screenplay by: Sanjeev Sharma; Sandeep Saket
- Story by: Sanjeev Sharma
- Starring: Manoj Bajpayee; Anupam Kher; Kay Kay Menon; Annu Kapoor; Vijay Raaz; Aditi Sharma; Jatin Sarna; Aparshakti Khurana
- Cinematography: John Jacob Payyapalli
- Edited by: Shree Narayan Singh
- Music by: Sanjoy Chowdhury Niranjan Saket
- Production companies: Wave Cinemas; Crouching Tiger Motion Pictures; Friday Filmworks
- Release date: October 14, 2016
- Running time: 130 minutes
- Country: India
- Language: Hindi

Saat Uchakkey (transl. Seven loafers) is a 2016 Indian Hindi-language comedy film directed and written by Sanjeev Sharma, starring an ensemble cast of Manoj Bajpayee, Kay Kay Menon, Annu Kapoor, Vijay Raaz, Aditi Sharma, Jatin Sarna and Nitin Bhasin. It was released on 14 October 2016.

== Plot ==
The story follows seven petty crooks, who come together to find a hidden gold treasure buried in a purani haveli in Delhi. Pappi Jaatwala plans the robbery. The film opens in a mental care facility where a young doctor is fascinated by a dangerous inmate called Bichchi, who may have mysterious powers. Bichchi escapes the hospital and is seen in the narrow lanes of old Delhi influencing the robbers, including Pappi. Pappi and his gang embark on the hunt. The team includes Pappi’s girlfriend Sona, Jaggi, Haggu, Khappe, Babbe Tashni, and Phodu. Chasing the gang is local cop Tejpal, who is fond of Sona. Anupam Kher is the demented owner of the haveli.

The gang manages to sneak into the mansion and even spot the gold treasure. However, Bichchi appears there miraculously and poses as God. He hypnotizes the thieves and makes them conscious of their wrongdoings. They all have a change of heart. Tejpal surrenders the treasure to the police station. Pappi wins a lottery worth ₹2 crore and marries Sona.

== Cast ==
- Manoj Bajpayee as Pappi Jaat wala
- Vijay Raaz as Jaggi Tirchha
- Aditi Sharma as Sona
- Annu Kapoor as Bichchi
- Jatin Sarna as Babbe Tashni
- Vipul Vig as Ajji
- Aparshakti Khurana as Khappe
- Nitin Bhasin as Haggu
- Anupam Kher as Diwan
- Kay Kay Menon as Tejpal
- Lushin Dubey as Sona's mother
- Meysam Eddie as Pamir
- Salman Khan as Rehaan Chadha

== Soundtrack ==
The music was composed by Jaidev Kumar, Niranjan Khound, Saket Singh, Bapi-Tutul, Vivek Kar and released by T-Series.

Saat Uchakkey

Soundtrack album by Jaidev Kumar, Niranjan Khound, Saket Singh, Bapi-Tutul, Vivek Kar
- Released: Oct 8, 2016
- Recorded: 2015–16
- Genre: Soundtrack
- Length: 14:19
- Label: T-Series
- Producers: Jaidev Kumar, Niranjan Khound, Saket Singh, Bapi-Tutul, Vivek Kar

Track list
| No. | Title | Lyrics | Music | Singer(s) | Length |
|---|---|---|---|---|---|
| 1. | "Neat Quarter" | Kumaar | Jaidev Kumar | Labh Janjua | 3:45 |
| 2. | "Chhap Tilak" | Amir Khusrow | Bapi-Tutul | Keerthi Sagathia | 3:14 |
| 3. | "Cycle Se Chalaang" | Kumaar | Vivek Kar | Kailash Kher | 3:02 |
| 4. | "Husn Wale Farebi" | Sahil Sultanpuri | Niranjan Khound, Saket Singh | Saket Singh | 4:18 |
| Total length: | | | | | 14:19 |

== Release ==
The film was released on 14 October 2016.
