= Khushi Bhardwaj =

Indian actress

- Khushi in 2026
- Occupation: Actress
- Years active: 2018 – present
- Known for: Baalveer Returns

Khushi Bhardwaj is an Indian actress. She portrayed Khushi in the fantasy television series Baalveer Returns, Ira in the legal drama web series Criminal Justice: A Family Matter, Sana in the film Tiku Weds Sheru, Garima in the mystery thriller series Gyaarah Gyaarah, and Devi in the action film Baby John.

== Filmography ==
=== Television ===
Year	Title	Role	Ref.
2019–2021	Baalveer Returns	Khushi	

=== Web series ===
Year	Title	Role	Notes	Ref.
2024	36 Days (TV series)	Aditi Jaykar		
2024	Gyaarah Gyaarah	Garima		
2024	IC 814: The Kandahar Hijack	Nidhi Ahuja		
2025	Criminal Justice: A Family Matter	Ira	Lead	

=== Film ===
Year	Title	Role	Ref.
2023	Tiku Weds Sheru	Sana	
2024	Baby John	Devi	

== External link ==
- Khushi Bhardwaj at IMDb
