= Dear Friend Hitler =

- Theatrical release poster
- Directed by: Rakesh Ranjan Kumar
- Screenplay by: Rakesh Ranjan Kumar
- Story by: Nalin Singh; Rakesh Ranjan Kumar
- Produced by: Dr. Parth
- Starring: Nalin Singh; Raghubir Yadav; Neha Dhupia; Aman Verma
- Cinematography: Fuwad Khan
- Edited by: Shri Narayan Singh
- Music by: Arvind-Lyton; Background Score: Sanjoy Chowdhury
- Production company: Amrapali Media Vision Pvt. Ltd.
- Distributed by: Mirchi Movies
- Release dates: 19 February 2011 (Berlin); 29 July 2011 (India)
- Running time: 107 minutes
- Country: India
- Language: Hindi

Dear Friend Hitler, released in India as Gandhi to Hitler, is a 2011 Indian Hindi-language war drama film based on letters written by Mahatma Gandhi to the leader of the Nazi Party and dictator of Nazi Germany Adolf Hitler. The film, starring Raghubir Yadav as Adolf Hitler and Neha Dhupia as Eva Braun, was directed by Rakesh Ranjan Kumar and produced by Anil Kumar Sharma under the production house Amrapali Media Vision. It was screened at the 61st Berlin International Film Festival where it received negative reviews. Film Business Asia quoted that "despite the provocative title, the film is not a tribute to the murderous Führer." It premiered in India on 29 July 2011.

== Plot ==
The film is set during World War II and centres upon the letters written by Gandhi to Adolf Hitler, and around the relationship of Hitler with his long-time lover Eva Braun, whom he married in his final days in the Berlin bunker where they died. The film depicts the difference between the ideologies of Gandhi and Hitler and claims the superiority of Gandhism over Nazism.

Another plot within the film concerns a young Indian couple who, while both dedicated to gaining independence for India, turn to greatly different paths to achieve that goal. The wife chooses to follow Gandhi, while the husband ultimately joins the Indian Legion, leading to dramatically divergent outcomes. Even though the wife's ultimate fate is not clear, the scenes towards the end show that the husband fails to return to India alive after trying to flee the collapsing Third Reich. The film concludes with the Indian flag flying high and a note stating, "15 August 1947: India wins freedom", portraying the superiority of civil disobedience and nonviolence over militancy and terrorism.

== Cast ==
- Raghubir Yadav as Adolf Hitler
- Neha Dhupia as Eva Braun
- Nalin Singh as Joseph Goebbels
- Nasir Abdullah as Albert Speer
- Jatin Sarna as Shaqir
- Lucky Vakharia as Amrita Kaur
- Nikita Anand as Magda Goebbels
- Bhupesh Kumar Pandey as Subhas Chandra Bose
- Avijit Dutt as Mahatma Gandhi
- Hanuman Prasad Rai as Otto Günsche

== Production ==
Anupam Kher had originally agreed to play the role of Hitler, but he backed out after Jewish organisations in India condemned him for playing the part because of Hitler's massacre of millions of Jews. The filmmakers accused Kher of not returning the ₹4 lakh (400,000 rupees) he had been paid after signing the contract and consequently sued him for ₹2.5 crore (25 million rupees). However, Kher perceived it as a way of filmmakers to promote their film before the release. It is the only mainstream Bollywood film to refer to the Indian Legion, a Waffen-SS unit recruited from Indian volunteers.

== Criticism and controversies ==
Domestic Poster

British newspaper, The Guardian, declared the film to be profoundly misguided and to show a shocking ignorance of history. Noah Massil, president of the Central Organization of Indian Jews in Israel (COIJI) stated that "he would write to President Pratibha Patil and Prime Minister Manmohan Singh to intervene in order to prevent bringing disrepute to our entertainment industry", but the filmmakers claimed that the film does not glorify Hitler, but rather juxtaposes him against Gandhi's ideology of peace.

We clarified that the movie is not about Hitler's ideology, but how his ideology of violence conflicts with Gandhi's ideology of peace. There is no glorification of Hitler's character.

— Anil Kumar Sharma, The Times of India

== Reception ==
The film was met with negative reviews. The Times of India gave the film 2 stars out of 5, calling it an "unnecessary play with history". The Daily News and Analysis gave the movie one star. NDTV criticised the movie for using Indian actors to play all non-Indian characters, using India itself as a stand-in to Europe, and for its "strands".

== See also ==
- List of artistic depictions of Mahatma Gandhi
