= Sanjay Batra =

Indian television actor

- Born: Raipur, Chhattisgarh, India
- Occupation: Actor

Sanjay Batra is a television actor in India. He has played roles in many popular TV serials like Jyoti, Balika Vadhu, Iss Pyaar Ko Kya Naam Doon?.

== Filmography ==
=== Television ===
Year	Serial	Role
2004	Aakrosh	Advocate Tejwani
2004–2006	Kesar	Vikram
2008–2010	Chotti Bahu	Sushil Purohit
2009–2010	Jyoti	Kamal Kishore Sharma
2010–2014	Balika Vadhu	Hemant Singh
2011–2012	Iss Pyaar Ko Kya Naam Doon?	Shashi Gupta
2011–2013	Mrs. Kaushik	Subodh Tyagi
2013–2014	Paanch 5	Pushkar Kharbanda
2014	Baawre	Sanjay
2015	Piya Rangrezz	Surinder Singh
2015	Ek Lakshya	Jogi
2017	Peshwa Bajirao	Dhanaji
2017–2019	Yeh Un Dinon Ki Baat Hai	Naresh Agarwal (Tauji)
2018	Dil Hi Toh Hai	Alok Puri
2019	Gathbandhan	Bharat Jadhav
2020	Maddam Sir	Gangadhar Acharya
2021–2022	Sirf Tum	Rakesh Sharma
2022	Jai Hanuman – Sankatmochan Naam Tiharo	
2023–present	Tose Naina Milai Ke	Devnarayan Chandel

=== Web series ===
Year	Title	Role
2018	Apharan	Govind Tyagi
2020	Dark 7 White	Shamsher
