= Madhurima Roy =

Indian actress

- Born: 12 April 1991 (age 35); Kolkata, West Bengal
- Notable work: Criminal Justice (Indian TV series)

Madhurima Roy (born 12 April 1991) is an Indian actor known for Criminal Justice and India's Next Top Model (season 3).

== Early life ==
Roy hails from Kolkata, West Bengal. she was born on 12 April 1991. Roy Graduated in bachelor's degree in commerce from Symbiosis College of Arts and Commerce, Pune University.

== Career ==
Roy started her career with her first travel Docu-fiction for Discovery channel called NEXA journeys on Asian Highway one for S-Cross. She later got selected for India's next top model (season 3) for MTV India. Roy appeared in her debut web-series (Love, Lust and Confusion) for Viu India and shortly after that she was seen in Kaushiki (web-series). Thereafter, marking her notable appearance in Criminal Justice for Hotstar produced by BBC and Applause Entertainment.

== Filmography ==
=== Web series ===
Year	Title	Role	Platform	Notes
2018	Love, Lust and Confusion (Season 1–2)	Played supporting roles as Rajat Barmecha's love interest and former girl friend respectively	Voot	
2018	Bombers	Played supporting role of one of the footballer's love interest	ZEE5	
2018	Kaushiki	Primary role of a girl named Nikita who struggles between two personalities in the past and present	Viu	
2018	Ready 2 Mingle	Played Radhika, primary role of Amol Parasher's love interest and a youtube sensation	YouTube	
2019	Criminal Justice	Sanaya Rath	Disney+ Hotstar	
2019	Little Things 3	The protagonist's ex- girlfriend.	Netflix	
2019	Four More Shots Please!	Played a supporting role as Bani J's gym manager.	Amazon Prime	
2020	Dark 7 White	Played supporting role of Sumeet Vyas's girlfriend Tashi who gets killed as a planned murder	ZEE5	
2020	Mafia	Tanya.	ZEE5	
2020	Mum Bhai	Played second lead as a role of a bar dancer and an aspiring actress named 'Ranjana' set in the 90s in Mumbai City.	ZEE5	
2020	Inside Edge 2	In a supporting role of media head's assistant named 'Shikha'	Amazon Prime	
2020	Code M	Played supporting role of the girl who transcends critical information, the Muslim girl who helps in the investigation, named 'Zeenat'	ZEE5	

=== Feature films ===
Year	Title	Role	Notes
2019	Judgemental Hai Kya	played a cameo as Hussain Dalal's love interest	
2019	Junglee	played a cameo as Vidyut Jamwal's assistant	
2019	The Zoya Factor	played a cameo as Sonam K Ahuja's stylist	
2022	Dobaaraa	Sarah Kunder	Supporting role
2026	Na Jaane Kaun Aa Gaya	Tina Agarwal	Lead role

=== Short films ===
Title	Role	Notes
Goals	Meera	Lead Actor

=== Television ===
Year	Title	Role	Notes
2017	India's Next Top Model (season 3)	Contestant	

=== Docu-Fiction shows ===
Title	Platform	Notes
Nexa Journeys on Asian Highway 1 sponsored by Maruti Suzuki S-Cross	Discovery Channel	
