= Dark 7 White =

Crime web series

- Written by: Mayuri Roychoudhury Mohinder Pratap
- Screenplay by: Pranjal Saxena Shashank Kunwar Snehil Dixit Mehra
- Directed by: Sattvik Mohanty
- Creative director: Snehil Dixit Mehra
- Starring: Sumeet Vyas; Monica Chaudhary; Tanya Kalra; Rachit Bahal; Kunj Anand; Jatin Sarna; Nidhi Singh; Shekhar Choudhary; Sanjay Batra
- Country of origin: India
- Original language: Hindi

Production
- Producer: Ekta Kapoor
- Production companies: Sphere Origins; Balaji Telefilms

Original release
- Network: ZEE5; ALT Balaji
- Release: 24 November 2020

Dark 7 White is a Hindi-language Indian crime thriller web series which is directed by Sattvik Mohanty and produced by Ekta Kapoor under the production house Sphere Origins & Balaji Telefilms. The series is an adaptation of the novel ‘‘Dark White’’ by author Shweta Brijpuria. The show stars Sumeet Vyas, Monica Chaudhary, Tanya Kalra, Rachit Bahal, Kunj Anand, Jatin Sarna, Nidhi Singh, Shekhar Choudhary & Sanjay Batra. The series was digitally released on both ZEE5 & ALT Balaji on 24 November 2020.

== Plot ==
The story revolves around Yudi (Sumeet Vyas) who is the upcoming CM of Rajasthan. However his dream of being the youngest Chief Minister comes to an unexpected end when he's murdered in broad daylight. His 7 closest friends become prime suspects as each one of them has a strong motive. Abhimanyu Singh (Jatin Sarna) is the cop investigating the case and as the mystery unfolds, many dark secrets unravel.

== Cast ==
- Sumeet Vyas as Yudhveer "Yudi" Singh Rathore a young politician
- Monica Chaudhary as Neelu
- Tanya Kalra as Greeshma
- Rachit Bahal as Dhaval
- Kunj Anand as Kush Lamba
- Jatin Sarna as ACP Abhimanyu Singh IPS
- Nidhi Singh as Daisy
- Shekhar Choudhary as Yogesh Khataria
- Sanjay Batra as Shamsher
- Madhurima Roy as Tashi

== Release ==
Dark 7 White released through ZEE5 & ALT Balaji simultaneously on 24 November 2020.

== Reception ==
Tatsam Mukherjee from Firstpost highlighted the shows inability to engage with the viewers and other underwhelming aspects of the show.

Nandani Ramnath from the Scroll.in appreciated Pranjal Saxena and Shashank Kunwar energetically churn out cod dialogues, however she wasn't impressed with the loosely executed plot.

Pramit Chatterjee from Mashable stated the show as "A Mind-numbing Political Thriller For Internet Edgelords And Ignorant Boomers"

Prathyush Parasuraman from Filmcompanion stated in his review "Actors like Vyas capable of good performances play caricatures of stereotypes and it is heartening to see them unfettered, and un-embarrassed by the writing, which is click-bait-with-zero-weight."
