= Sikandar (2025 film) =

2025 Indian film by A. R. Murugadoss

- Theatrical release poster
- Directed by: A. R. Murugadoss
- Screenplay by: A. R. Murugadoss
- Dialogue by: Rajat Arora; Hussain Dalal; Abbas Dalal; A.R. Murugadoss
- Story by: A. R. Murugadoss
- Produced by: Sajid Nadiadwala
- Starring: Salman Khan; Kajal Aggarwal; Rashmika Mandanna; Sathyaraj; Sharman Joshi
- Cinematography: Tirru
- Edited by: Vivek Harshan
- Music by: Songs: Pritam; Score: Santhosh Narayanan
- Production companies: Nadiadwala Grandson Entertainment; Salman Khan Films
- Distributed by: Pen Marudhar Entertainment
- Release date: 30 March 2025
- Running time: 135 minutes
- Country: India
- Language: Hindi
- Budget: ₹200 crore
- Box office: ₹176.18 crore

Sikandar is a 2025 Indian Hindi-language action drama film written and directed by A. R. Murugadoss and produced by Sajid Nadiadwala. It stars Salman Khan, Kajal Aggarwal, Rashmika Mandanna, Sharman Joshi, Sathyaraj, Jatin Sarna, Sanjay Kapoor, Prateik Smita Patil(in a special appearance) and Kishore. In the film, Sanjay "Sikandar" Rajkot (Khan) is motivated by a tragic accident to redeem his past by changing the lives of three people and finds himself targeted by a vengeful politician.

Sikandar was officially announced in April 2024, with principal photography commencing the following June. It was predominantly shot in Mumbai and Hyderabad and wrapped by March 2025. It is the second film featuring Khan and Nadiadwala since Kick (2014). Sikandar's soundtrack was composed by Pritam, its background score was composed by Santhosh Narayanan, its cinematography handled by Tirru, and was edited by Vivek Harshan. The film had an estimated production budget of ₹200 crore.

Sikandar was released in theatres on 30 March 2025 in standard and IMAX formats, coinciding with Eid al-Fitr. The film received generally negative reviews from critics who criticized the screenplay and direction. It was a box office disaster with an estimated worldwide box office gross of ₹176.18 crore against a budget of ₹200 crore, though it emerged as the ninth highest-grossing Hindi film of 2025.

== Plot ==
Sanjay Rajkot, the final heir of the Rajkot dynasty of Gujarat, is known to the people as "Sikandar." He is married to Saisri, a painter, who is referred to as Rani Sahiba. One day during a flight, Arjun, the son of Minister Rakesh Pradhan, encounters Monica, a former pornographic film actress who has since married and has a son. Arjun threatens to show her past videos to her son in exchange for sex. However, Sanjay, who is also on the flight intervenes, engaging in a fistfight with Arjun and his bouncers. He ultimately forces Arjun to apologize to Monica. The next day, Minister Rakesh hires Inspector Prakash to arrest Sanjay for attacking his son, personally bribing him for the job. Prakash arrives at Sanjay's mansion in Rajkot, only to find that he is not there. Saisri informs him that Sanjay has already gone to the police station. When Prakash reaches the station, he finds Sanjay there but with his senior officers, who order Prakash to let him go.

Saisri feels that Sanjay is always distant from her. She often notices him forgetting their wedding anniversary and her birthday. One day, she discovers that she is pregnant and tries to share the news with Sanjay. However, at the same time, his quarry manager sells 40 kilos of explosives, which are threatened to be used at a site. This forces Sanjay to rush there to stop the attack. Unbeknownst to him, Saisri follows him to the site, where she gets caught in a bomb blast and is severely wounded. She is rushed to the hospital, but succumbs to her injuries before she can tell Sanjay about her pregnancy. Prior to her death, she had signed up for organ donation, and her lungs, eyes, and heart are transplanted into patients in Mumbai.

Upon learning that her organs were used in surgeries there, Sanjay sets out to find the recipients and goes to Mumbai. He soon discovers that her lungs were donated to Kamar, an orphaned child from Dharavi, Mumbai; her eyes to Vaidehi Ranga; and her heart to Nisha. Sanjay first encounters Kamar and learns that he suffers from Lung disease due to the severe pollution in his area. The pollution is caused by Virat Bakshi, a businessman who has bought several acres of land to build a shopping mall. However, in an attempt to force the remaining residents to vacate, he uses the land he owns as a dumping ground for garbage, worsening the living conditions.

Next, Sanjay meets Vaidehi and discovers that she lives with her husband, mother-in-law, and father-in-law. She runs a vada shop, but her business has stopped receiving orders. She believes her strict father-in-law is the reason, as he holds the belief that women should not work. Finally, Sanjay meets Nisha, who is in the hospital because her donated heart has started to fail. Determined to save her, Sanjay arranges for a doctor from Dubai to guide the local doctors through a video call, which helps to stabilize her condition. He later learns that Nisha was born with a heart condition, which worsened after her ex-boyfriend, Kapil, callously informed her that he was getting married, which caused her immense emotional distress. This leads Sanjay to confront Kapil and beat him up for causing distress.

Before leaving for Rajkot, Arjun spots Sanjay and his group during a speech rally by his father Rakesh. This leads to a cat-and-mouse chase between Sanjay and Arjun, but in the end, Arjun accidentally kills himself by dropping Molotov cocktails on his own car. As Sanjay is leaving Mumbai, he receives a phone call from Rakesh, who vows revenge and says that he will kill all three of the organ recipients. Despite this, Sanjay also challenges that he will protect them from him and stays in Mumbai. Eventually, Sanjay helps all three of the organ recipients and their families and also develops Mumbai into a better place, allowing Kamar and other children to live peacefully; Vaidehi runs a business after her father-in-law allows her to work; and Nisha lives happily with her family. But soon, Rakesh frames Sanjay in a terrorist bomb attack, which makes the organ recipients'trust in Sanjay decrease, but his friends help clear the confusion between them. Soon, Rakesh's henchmen go to attack the hospital where Kamar is hospitalized due to his lung problem, and Sanjay battles with his henchmen and defeats them. The following night, Sanjay breaks into Rakesh’s mansion and beats him. In the end, Sanjay surrenders himself to the police, but the whole of Mumbai comes to protest about his arrest, and he's set free, thus earning him the title "Sikandar."

== Cast ==
- Salman Khan as Sanjay "Sikandar" Rajkot
- Kajal Aggarwal as Vaidehi
- Rashmika Mandanna as Saisri
- Sathyaraj as Minister Rakesh Pradhan
- Sharman Joshi as Amar, Sanjay’s aide
- Prateik Smita Patil as Arjun Pradhan
- Vikas Verma as Salim
- Anjini Dhawan as Nisha
- Kishore as Inspector Prakash
- Jatin Sarna as De Niro, a Taxi driver
- Sanjay Kapoor as Nisha's father
- Nawab Shah as Virat Bakshi
- Vishal Vashishtha as Rangachari
- Kishori Shahane as Minister's wife
- Abha Ranta as Aishwarya Pradhan
- Sulabha Arya as Savithri
- Vijayant Kohli as Sudarshan
- Ayan Khan as Kamaruddin "Kamar"
- Prakash Sudarshan as Aditya
- Abhilash Chaudhary as Deva
- Navdeep Tomar as Salim
- Gurjant Singh as Mayur
- Shreya Gupto as Medical intern
- Anant Mahadevan as Chief Minister
- Ayaan Lall as Kapil, Nisha's boyfriend
- Arjun Dwivedi as Kapil's uncle
- Sunny Thakur as Zuber Ali
- Abhimanyu Vashishth as Varadachari
- Adiba Hussain as Asha
- Neha Iyer as Monica
- Amitabh Ghanekar as Prashant, Minister's PA
- Rajesh Jhaveri as Rangachari's father
- Dhanya Balakrishna as Saisri's maid
- Ravi Kothari as Bhavesh Kumar, Constable of Rajkot
- Mitra Gadhavi as Ramesh, Sanjay's quarry manager
- Meghna Pandey as Air Hostress

== Production ==
=== Development ===
In February 2024, it was reported that Salman Khan and Sajid Nadiadwala would begin production on a film, nearly a decade on from their last collaboration Kick (2014): A.R. Murugadoss was then reported to be the film's director. It marks the first film between Khan and Murugadoss, who initially pitched the lead role of Ghajini (2008) to Khan. Nadiadwala and Murugadoss both recruited Khan for Sikandar.

The film was announced by Khan on his social media platforms on Eid al-Fitr in April 2024, and expressed his excitement about collaborating with Murugadoss and Nadiadwala. The film was scheduled to be filmed soon thereafter across multiple countries, including Portugal and other European countries but was delayed due to Murugadoss' commitments on Madharasi (2025). Murugadoss eventually worked on Sikandar and Madharasi simultaneously until June 2024, although, he completed significant portions of Madharasi before continuing on Sikandar. With an estimated production budget of ₹180 crore, Sikandar is the most expensive film produced by Nadiadwala and one of the most expensive Indian films of all time.

=== Casting ===
In May 2024, Kajal Aggarwal and Rashmika Mandanna were announced as the female leads opposite Salman Khan, marking their first on-screen collaboration. Shortly thereafter, Sathyaraj and Prateik Babbar were confirmed as part of the cast.

In September 2024, Sharman Joshi and Anjini Dhawan were added to the ensemble cast. The following month, Kishore also joined the film’s cast.

=== Filming ===
Principal photography commenced on 19 June 2024, with aerial-based action sequences shot in Mumbai. An action sequence between Khan and Babbar was filmed in July, and in August, further action sequences, including gun fights and hand-to-hand action sequences, were shot over a period of 40 days across Mumbai. For these sequences, it was reported that sets worth ₹15 crore were created to resemble Dharavi and Matunga. In September, Khan sustained a rib injury during filming. Filming resumed later that month, with a song involving Khan, Mandanna and 200 background dancers being filmed. Filming was again halted due to heavy rains across Mumbai.

Filming was further halted due to security concerns after Khan received death threats from Lawrence Bishnoi, with a shooting also reported near Khan's home. After increasing on-set security, principal photography resumed in November, with filming taking place in Falaknuma Palace. Two songs featuring Qawwali and Holi-style themes were reportedly also filmed. Action sequences involving a train and 350 extras were then filmed on elaborate sets recreating Borivali and Mumbai Suburban. In January 2025, final filming period began in Mumbai, with four action sequences shot, reportedly including aircraft, trains, and sets resembling a prison and a hospital. Principal photography concluded on 14 March 2025.

== Music ==
Sikandar

Soundtrack album by Pritam
- Released: 10 April 2025
- Recorded: 2024–2025
- Genre: Feature film soundtrack
- Length: 26:53
- Language: Hindi
- Label: Zee Music Company
- Producer: Sajid Nadiadwala

Pritam chronology
Chandu Champion (2024)	Sikandar (2025)	Metro... In Dino (2025)
External audio
- Sikandar - Full Audio Jukebox on YouTube

The film's music rights were acquired by Zee Music Company, with the songs being composed by Pritam and the background score being composed by Santhosh Narayanan. The first single, "Zohra Jabeen", was released on 4 March 2025. The second single, "Bam Bam Bhole", was released one week later, and the third single, "Sikandar Naache", was released on 18 March. The fourth single, "Hum Aapke Bina" was released on 28 March 2025. The fifth single, “Taikhaane Mein” was released on 8 April 2025.

Track listing
No.	Title	Lyrics	Singer(s)	Length
1.	"Zohra Jabeen"	Sameer Anjaan, Danish Sabri, Mellow D	Nakash Aziz, Dev Negi, Mellow D	3:24
2.	"Bam Bam Bhole"	Sameer Anjaan	Shaan, Dev Negi, Antara Mitra	3:38
3.	"Sikandar Naache"	Sameer Anjaan	Amit Mishra, Akasa Singh, Siddhaant Miishhraa	4:06
4.	"Hum Aapke Bina"	Sameer Anjaan	Arijit Singh	4:52
5.	"Taikhaane Mein"	S.O.M	Vishal Mishra	6:15
6.	"Hum Aapke Bina" (Palak Muchhal Version)	Sameer Anjaan	Palak Muchhal	4:38
Total length:				26:53

== Release ==
=== Theatrical ===
Sikandar was theatrically released worldwide on 30 March 2025, in standard and IMAX formats, coinciding with Eid-al-Fitr, and clashed with L2: Empuraan and Veera Dheera Sooran: Part 2. The film was released in more than 5,000 screens across India.

Many showings were cancelled due to the lack of audience and were replaced with other films including L2: Empuraan and The Diplomat. Murugadoss blamed Khan's late arrival on set for the film's failure, to which Khan retorted by claiming he had a rib injury, and sarcastically making fun of the poor box office performance of the director's other film Madharaasi.

=== Home media ===
The film began streaming on Netflix from 25 May 2025.

== Reception ==
=== Critical response ===
Sikander received generally negative reviews from critics. On the review aggregator website Rotten Tomatoes, 5% of 19 critics' reviews are positive, with an average rating of 3.8/10.

Bollywood Hungama gave 2.5/5 stars, writing "On the whole, Sikander attempts to deliver a powerful social message and showcases Salman Khan in a role that's sure to resonate with his fanbase. However, the impact is diluted by a weak script and erratic direction. At the box office, the film will initially benefit from the Eid holiday and the lack of competition, but sustaining momentum in the long run will be a tough challenge. Tushar Joshi of India Today gave 2/5 stars, and wrote "Sikandar is exhausting and a bit dated. But if you want to see Bhaijaan do his thing and don’t expect much, it could be your pick this Eid". Dhaval Roy of The Times of India gave 2 out of 5 stars, and wrote "A Salman Khan movie is a genre in itself, and you know what to expect—gravity-defying action, larger-than-life heroism, and punchy dialogues. Written and directed by A Murugadoss, this actioner checks all these boxes but suffers from an underwhelming plot and cliched narrative". Rishabh Suri of the Hindustan Times gave 2 out of 5 stars, writing "Salman Khan headlining an action film was once a formula for guaranteed success. However, Sikandar falls considerably short of the promised popcorn entertainment, hampered by a fundamentally weak narrative".

Saibal Chatterjee of NDTV gave the film 2/5 stars, and wrote "An all-out assault on all things logical, Sikandar, written and directed by A.R. Murugadoss with the express purpose of giving Salman Khan's do-gooder bhai persona a leg up, has the airs of an emperor who can do no wrong. But nothing that the film does is quite right. Its ambition far outstrips its output". Gautam Batra of Pinkvilla gave 2/5 stars, writing "Overall, Sikandar fails to deliver what it sets out to and hardly qualifies as mass entertaining cinema. The film has a decent story but due to lack of depth, good music and strong performances, it fails to leave an impression". Shubhra Gupta of The Indian Express rated the film 1.5 out of 5 stars, writing "In ‘Sikandar’, director AR Murugadoss and actor Salman Khan flounder spectacularly, failing to give us anything we haven’t seen before". Shubham Kulkarni of OTTPlay gave half a star out of 5, writing "If Salman Khan reading from a giant board while squeezing his eyes is the level of dedication you crave, go for the AR Murugadoss directorial. Cinephiles deserve better. Fans deserve the best. If this is an Eid Bonanza, fans should demand more". Baradwaj Rangan of Galatta Plus, wrote "Sikandar is so generic that you feel they could have made the same film even without this premise. After all, if you just want Salman Khan to sing and dance and do action and delight his fans, you can get by with the thinnest of plots, no? Besides, how can you expect the audience to stay invested when the hero himself looks so bored?".

=== Box office ===
Sikandar grossed ₹30.06 crore domestically and ₹45 crore worldwide on its opening day, emerging as Khan's seventh highest opening day grosser. The film surpassed ₹100 crore worldwide on its second day and reached ₹105.18 crore in India within five days. Its global box office collection crossed ₹150 crore in the same period. DNA India reported that the film gross ₹154.35 crore worldwide in the first week and ₹97.47 crore net in India. It concluded the theatrical run with an estimated worldwide gross of ₹176.18 crore.
