= Criminal Justice (Indian TV series) =

Indian web series (2019)

- Promotional poster
- Genre: Crime; Thriller; Legal drama
- Written by: Shridhar Raghavan
- Directed by: Tigmanshu Dhulia; Vishal Furia
- Starring: Pankaj Tripathi; Vikrant Massey; Jackie Shroff; Anupriya Goenka; Mita Vashisht; Pankaj Saraswat; Rucha Inamdar; Gaurav Dwivedi; Madhurima Roy
- Composer: Sameer Phaterpekar
- Country of origin: India
- Original language: Hindi
- No. of episodes: 10

Production
- Executive producers: Siddharth Khaitan; Rajesh Chadha
- Producers: Sameer Nair; Arnav Chakravarti; Deepak Segal; Myleeta Aga
- Production location: India
- Cinematography: Harendra Singh
- Editors: Abhijit Deshpande; Sourabh Prabhudesai; Raju Nikalje; Robin Sharma
- Running time: 41-60 minutes
- Production companies: BBC Studios India; Applause Entertainment

Original release
- Network: Hotstar
- Release: 5 April 2019

Related
- Criminal Justice: Behind Closed Doors; Criminal Justice: Adhura Sach; Criminal Justice: A Family Matter

Criminal Justice is an Indian Hindi-language crime thriller legal drama miniseries written by Shridhar Raghavan and was directed by Tigmanshu Dhulia and Vishal Furia. It is based on the 2008 British television series of the same name. Starring Pankaj Tripathi, Vikrant Massey, Jackie Shroff, Anupriya Goenka and Mita Vashisht in lead roles, the storyline follows the life of individuals on a gut-wrenching journey through the criminal justice system.

Criminal Justice was released through Hotstar on 5 April 2019. It received positive response from critics, praising the performances of the principal characters, Tripathi, Massey and Shroff respectively.

In February 2020, the makers announced a second series, titled Criminal Justice: Behind Closed Doors, which was released on 24 December 2020. Criminal Justice: Adhura Sach, the third series, premiered on 26 August 2022. In May 2025, the fourth series, Criminal Justice: A Family Matter, premiered.

== Plot ==
The series starts by introducing Aditya Sharma as a cab driver who comes from a middle-class family. He had plans of meeting his friends at a pub after completing his work, but a foul-mouthed lady sits in his cab and keeps on changing location, because of which all his night plans become jeopardized, while talking to her they realize that they are alumni of the same college. The lady suffers from mood swings, so it can be easily come to know that she is a drug addict. The lady's name was later revealed to be Shanaya Rath.

Aditya gets caught in the police station itself when the neighbour who goes to there to give his statement identifies him as the man he saw running out of the apartment. The police inspector 'Raghu Salian’ and the others search him and they find the murder weapon (they at least assume it to be) with him. While interrogating, Madhav Mishra a street-smart advocate happens to mistake Aditya's case to be case and tells Raghu Salian that he is Aditya's lawyer, he then realises that he will be handling a murder case and that's how his life changes. Madhav Mishra informs Aditya's parents about the crime and that Aditya has been accused of murdering and raping Sanaya Rath. Aditya is produced before the magistrate within 24 hours and he pleads not guilty, however, his request for bail is rejected by the Magistrate. Because of which he will be placed in Police custody for 14 days. Aditya agrees to do a narco test, and a selected portion of it is shown online. People start shaming the taxi services company where Aditya will be working. Aditya's brother-in-law soon starts getting harassed by recovery agents due to non-payment of loan. Aditya's sister loses her job and the entire family becomes a victim of ridicule by the society. Raghu Salian is hell bent on proving that Aditya is the murderer. Mandira Mathur, a Supreme Court advocate soon starts looking after Aditya's case, she starts representing Aditya and becomes the defence lawyer and Advocate Bhandarkar becomes the public prosecutor. She has a knack with her usage of words, she helps drop Aditya's charge on rape by proving that it was consensual, but however fails to get him an acquittal. Aditya is asked to sign a plea bargaining agreement (where if you plead guilty your sentence will be reduced), as all the evidences point towards him. Mandira Mathur drops the case and Nikhat, her assistant starts representing Aditya as she asks Aditya to listen to what his heart says, because of which Aditya pleads not guilty.

The series soon drifts into life spent by a convict in prison, this is where we can draw similarity between Criminal Justice Season 1 and Shawshank redemption, where you see Aditya slowly adapting to the prison environment, just like Andrew "Andy" Dufresne. He joins Mustafa and gang, after being rescued by Taklya when Layak Talukdar tries to rape him. The prison is entirely split into two groups, Layak's gang and Mustafa's gang. Aditya starts jelling with Mustafa and gang and in one of the episodes, Aditya is sent to Solitary confinement for 1 year along with Mustafa for being wrongfully caught for peddling drugs in the prison. And then the series focuses on how Aditya starts rebelling against Layak becoming like one of the member of Mustafa's gang. Meanwhile, Aditya's sister divorces her husband and battles for child custody, Aditya's father starts earning again to survive. But they are still left with hope that Aditya will get released from the prison one day.

Coming back to the case, Nikhat and Madhav start investigating the case together and they build a good rapport with each other. Nikhat, Madhav and Raghu Salian soon find out that Sanaya Rath is a drug addict, and she was a volunteer in LDFR, a drug rehabilitation centre, run by Naresh Lakani and his wife Kanika Lakani, a girl named Pallavi (ex-employee of LDFR) reveals that Naresh Lakani runs a racket of child prostitution by trading under privileged children. Sanaya wanted to reveal this secret to public and Kanika Lakani wanted to stop this from happening. In the end, Aditya fights with Layak and when he is about to kill him, Mustafa does it for him. Aditya is released from the prison. He comes out braver and better than what he was before going into prison.

== Cast ==
- Vikrant Massey as Aditya Sharma
- Pankaj Tripathi as Madhav Mishra
- Jackie Shroff as Mustafa
- Anupriya Goenka as Nikhat Hussain
- Mita Vashisht as Mandira Mathur
- Rucha Inamdar as Avni Parashar
- Gaurav Dwivedi as Gautam Parashar
- Jagat Rawat as Diwakar Sharma
- Annapurna Vitthal Bhairi as Sujata Sharma
- Ninad Kamat as Sunil Bhandarkar
- Rituraj Singh as Dr. Naresh Lakhani
- Tuhinaa Vohra as Kanika Lakhani
- Madhurima Roy as Sanaya Rath
- Sanjay Gurbaxani as Rustom Barucha
- Gayatri Gauri as Ronjana
- Pankaj Saraswat as ACP Raghu Salian
- Dibyendu Bhattacharya as Layak Talukder
- Raaj Gopal Iyer as Constable Namdeo Jadhav
- Komal Chhabriya as Rukhsana Hussain
- Dhiraj Totlani as Jimmy D’souza
- Rukhsana Behruzi as Justice Smita Thakur
- Mohammed Zeeshan Ayyub as Dr.Raj Nagpal
- Surveen Chawla as Anju Nagpal
- Barkha Singh as Shivani Mathur
- Shweta Basu Prasad as Lekha Agastya
- Asha Negi as Roshni Saluja

== Episodes ==
No.	Title	Directed by	Written by	Original release date
1	"Once Upon a Night"	Tigmanshu Dhulia	Shridhar Raghavan	5 April 2019
Aditya drives the family cab, ends up picking up a young woman and spends the night with her. When he wakes up, he realises that the one-night stand has turned into a nightmare. The girl is stabbed to death and he has no recollection of events.
2	"Under Arrest"	Tigmanshu Dhulia	Shridhar Raghavan	5 April 2019
Aditya is under arrest for rape & murder. An advocate Madhav bargains to represent him, but negotiations fail. Mandira, a reputed advocate takes up his case free of charge surprising all.
3	"The Price of Life"	Vishal Furia	Shridhar Raghavan	5 April 2019
Mandira grapples with Aditya's amnesia related to that fateful night. Madhav finds a new lead in the investigation. In jail, Mustafa makes an unexpected demand from Aditya.
4	"The Trial"	Vishal Furia	Shridhar Raghavan	5 April 2019
Mustafa takes Aditya under his wing and gives him a welcome gift. Madhav finds a mountain of evidence against Aditya at trial.
5	"Beginning of the End"	Vishal Furia	Shridhar Raghavan	5 April 2019
Rivalry between Layak and Mustafa heats up. Aditya weighs the pros and cons of pleading guilty as Jimmy D'Souza makes a shocking revelation in court.
6	"The Judgement Day"	Vishal Furia	Shridhar Raghavan	5 April 2019
While Aditya took a daunting task to appease Mustafa, Nikhat risks her career to free him. Judge gives the verdict.
7	"A New Bond"	Vishal Furia	Shridhar Raghavan	5 April 2019
Aditya's bond with Mustafa grows strong while his family crumbles. Meanwhile, Madhav finds new evidence that could turn the case around.
8	"The Going gets Tough"	Vishal Furia	Shridhar Raghavan	5 April 2019
With the entry of the new jail superintendent, Aditya and Mustafa's relationship ends up in solitary confinement. Meanwhile, Madhav and Nikhat find a new clue which went unnoticed.
9	"A New Kingpin"	Vishal Furia	Shridhar Raghavan	5 April 2019
A brutal fight sends Aditya to the hospital where he meets Mustafa. Raghu helps Madhav and Nikhat, together they open a new can of worms.
10	"The Mystery"	Vishal Furia	Shridhar Raghavan	5 April 2019
Aditya peddles drugs in the jail but it doesn't end well with Layak. Raghu produces a search warrant against the new suspect. Pushed into the corner, Aditya plans his final revenge against Layak. New crime & evidence has come to light and Aditya is acquitted. Aditya starts a new life. Finally, Madhav cleans up his apartment.

== Production ==
In January 2018, Sameer Nair, CEO of Aditya Birla Group's content studio Applause Entertainment, collaborated with BBC Studios, in order to adapt their British series Criminal Justice and The Office, for the Indian audiences. Sameer teamed up with Shridhar Raghavan, to pen the screenplay and dialogues for the Hindi adaptation. In April 2018, Tigmanshu Dhulia was announced as the director of the series, eventually marking his digital debut, and the makers signed Pankaj Tripathi, Vikrant Massey and Jackie Shroff to play the pivotal characters. It also marked Shroff's debut in a digital platform. Vishal Furia served the credits for co-direction.

=== Filming ===
Principal shoot of the series began on 28 April 2018 and was completed in January 2019, with filming mostly held in Mumbai. Key filming locations included Film City, Goregaon East, where sets for the prison, police station, and Aditya Sharma’s family residence were constructed and shot

== Release ==
The series' digital distribution rights were brought by Hotstar. On 15 January 2019, the platform announced its foray to original content production exclusively for the service, with the shows release on its label called Hotstar Specials, was officially announced. The platform eventually collaborated with Applause Entertainment for releasing the show, along with the production house's four other shows in the first set of their original contents. The official trailer of the series was released on 28 March 2019. It was released on 5 April 2019, in Hindi and dubbed Tamil, Telugu, Malayalam, Kannada, Bengali and Marathi languages.

== Reception ==
=== Critical response ===
Archika Khurana of The Times of India gave 3.5 out of 5 stars stating "Criminal Justice walks us through a series of events that happen during remand, judicial custody, and hearings, is intriguing and engrossing for most parts." Sanjukta Sharma of Scroll.in opined "Criminal Justice works because of the story and its two central characters." Sana Farzeen writing for The Indian Express says, "Massey stands out playing a young boy who suddenly finds himself in a grave situation. Tripathi once again aces a character with dry humor, making you smirk at his witty lines." The critic recommends Criminal Justice for those who like crime- dramas.

Rohan Naahar of Hindustan Times rates it with 3.5 out of 5 stars and feels that the series being a remake relies on its actors to do the heavy lifting. He opines, "Fortunately, Massey, Tripathi and especially Shroff, are tremendous." Udita Jhunjhunwala, reviewing for The Quint writes "Supporting cast members Saraswat, Inamdar and Dwivedi (as Aditya's sister and brother-in-law respectively) and Roy as the murdered girl are the most convincing." Parmita Uniyal of India Today said that "Shroff's performance is one of the high points of the series, something that stays with you," while also saying that "[The show] could have a stronger impact with shorter episodes, crisper editing and right twists and turns."

== Accolades ==
Year	Award	Category	Recipient	Result
2019	ITA Awards	Best Actor - Web series	Vikrant Massey	Nominated
2019	IReel Awards	Best Actor (Drama)	Vikrant Massey	Nominated
2019	IReel Awards	Best Supporting Actor	Jackie Shroff	Nominated

== Sequels ==
On 13 February 2020, Sameer Nair announced a second installment of Criminal Justice, with Pankaj Saraswat, Raaj Gopal Iyer, Pankaj Tripathi, Anupriya Goenka, Mita Vashisht reprising their roles from their first season, whereas Jisshu Sengupta and Kirti Kulhari joined the new cast. The series was released through Disney+ Hotstar on 24 December 2020.

The third installment was released on 26 August 2022 with Pankaj Tripathi and Shweta Basu Prasad in the lead roles. Pankaj Tripathi and Khushboo Atre would be reprising their roles from previous 2 seasons, whereas Purab Kohli, Swastika Mukherjee, Adinath Kothare, Kalyanee Mulay, Aaditya Gupta, Deshna Dugad and Aatm Prakash Mishra are new addition to the cast.

The 4th season was released on 30 May 2025.
