= Criminal Justice: A Family Matter =

Indian Hindi-language legal drama television series

- Promotional poster
- Genre: Crime; Legal drama Thriller
- Created by: Harman Wadala; Rahul Ved Prakash
- Written by: Harman Wadala; Sameer Mishra; Sandeep Jain
- Directed by: Rohan Sippy
- Starring: Pankaj Tripathi; Mohammed Zeeshan Ayyub; Surveen Chawla; Khushboo Atre; Asha Negi; Khushi Bhardwaj
- Country of origin: India
- Original language: Hindi
- No. of episodes: 8

Production
- Producers: Sameer Nair; Deepak Segal; Sameer Gogate
- Production location: India
- Production companies: BBC Studios India; Applause Entertainment

Original release
- Network: JioHotstar
- Release: 29 May – 3 July 2025

Related
- Criminal Justice (2019)

Criminal Justice: A Family Matter is an Indian Hindi-language legal drama television series, directed by Rohan Sippy and produced by Sameer Nair. Starring Pankaj Tripathi, Mohammed Zeeshan Ayyub, Surveen Chawla, Khushboo Atre and Asha Negi in prominent roles.

== Synopsis ==
Veteran lawyer Madhav Mishra defends Raj Nagpal, found holding the murdered body of nurse Roshni Saluja after his daughter's birthday. As the courtroom battle intensifies, buried truths begin to surface, suggesting not everyone is who they claim to be.

== Cast ==
- Pankaj Tripathi as Advocate Madhav Mishra
- Mohammed Zeeshan Ayyub as Dr. Raj Nagpal
- Surveen Chawla as Anju Nagpal, Raj's wife
- Asha Negi as Roshni Saluja, Nurse
- Khushboo Atre as Ratna Mishra, Madhav's wife
- Mita Vashisht as Mandira Mathur, Corporate lawyer
- Shweta Basu Prasad as Lekha Agastya, Public Prosecutor
- Khushi Bhardwaj as Ira
- Barkha Singh as Shivani Mathur
- Kalyanee Mulay as API Gauri Karmarkar
- Sohaila Kapur as Gurmeet Nagpal
- Pankaj Saraswat as DCP Raghu Salian
- Rajesh Khera as Solkar, Lekha's senior
- Ajeet Singh Palawat as Sr. Inspector Harsh Pradhan; Gauri's ex-husband
- Raaj Gopal Iyer as Constable Namdeo Jadhav
- Aatm Prakash Mishra as Deepu, Madhav's assistant
- Garrvil Mohan as Shaurya
- Avirat Parekh as TV News Anchor
- Ranjit Deval as Sessions Court Judge
- Bidisha Ghosh Sharma
- Shubhangi Latkar

== Episodes ==
No.	Title	Directed by	Written by	Original release date
1	"A Birthday to Remember"	Rohan Sippy	Unknown	29 May 2025
Raj Nagpal, a successful surgeon lives with his daughter Ira and his mother. Ira has Asperger's and Raj's estranged wife, Anju lives next door. Anju, a former lawyer has given up her career to focus on Ira. Raj is in a relationship with nurse Roshni who is also Ira's caretaker. Ira is given a piano as a gift for her birthday but she faints as she is playing it. Ira seems to have recently developed health issues and the wait for her test results has everyone on edge. Dr Mistry, Ira's physician tells Raj that Ira does not have pancreatic cancer but is suffering from hypoglcemia. Morning after Ira's birthday party, Kamala the maid arrives at Raj's flat to see the door open and Raj, covered in blood, holding Roshni's body. API Gauri is assigned the case by ACP Salian and detains Raj. However, the police are not able to find the murder weapon at the scene. Meanwhile, Madhav has opened his own firm with Deepu and Mandira Mathur's daughter, Shivani working as an associate. He is also working for a corporate firm CLU which uses Madhav's common man image to settle cases with plaintiffs suing their high profile clients. For his good work, CLU gifts him a red Jeep. At the end of the episode, Anju comes to Madhavs firm to ask him to defend Raj.
2	"Buried Secrets"	Rohan Sippy	Unknown	29 May 2025
Dr. Raj Nagpal is arrested for murder. Madhav questions Ira under Anju's supervision but his questions trigger Ira. He sees a drawing in her book showing Roshni on the floor surrounded by blood. Gauri sees an award given to Raj in the pics taken at the birthday party. Concluding that the scalpel embedded in the glass is the murder weapon, the police try to locate it. Gauri sees the garbage truck leaving the building and asks the garbage pick up man Monu where the bags are dropped off. The police try to locate the weapon at the landfill. Shivani's attempt to recreate the crime scene with Madhavs team has hilarious consequences. CLU rep Shaurya reminds Madhav that he should not take high profile cases contrary to his image which could endanger his arrangement with CLU. Lekha Agastya watches prosecutor Kadam at the arraignment and feels he will not succeed against Madhav.
3	"Quid Pro Quo"	Rohan Sippy	Unknown	29 May 2025
The police are unable to find the murder weapon. CLU issue a termination letter to Madhav asking him to decide by the end of the day.Lekha approaches Solkar suggesting that Kadam may not be the man for the case and Solkar rebukes for trying to get back at Madhav rather than prosecuting the guilty. Deepu, noticing Monu's lecherous behaviour, follows him and records him taking pics and videos of ladies and leaks it the media. Since he had access to the entire building and also means of disposal, Monu is arrested. The police find that most of the pics and video's on Monu's phone are of Roshni. Deepu's deeds anger Madhav who tells him that they could have used this to cast reasonable doubt during the trial. Disappointed with Gauri, Salian brings in her ex husband Harsh to oversee the case. While interrogating Monu, Harsh realises that he is left handed while forensics confirmed that the murderer is right handed. Gauri finds another video on Monu's phone showing Raj and Anju kissing in his car in the parking lot.
4	"Domino Effect"	Rohan Sippy	Unknown	5 June 2025
Lekha is assigned the case with a warning from Solkar. Gauri finds that Roshni had an abortion 2 months before the murder at 9 weeks into the pregnancy. At Roshni's cremation, Madhav's team meets Digvijay, Roshni's ex-fiance who says Roshni left him after meeting Raj. Gauri's team find the scalpel and file the charge sheet. Anju is seen writing a cheque and putting it in an envelope. Anju hires Mandira as her lawyer because the garbage bag, in which the weapon was found , was from her house.
5	"Trauma Flashback"	Rohan Sippy	Unknown	12 June 2025
Madhav and Shivani are bothered by Mandira representing Anju. Harsh tries to intimidate Raj into pleading guilty but both Raj and Anju plead not guilty. Madhav brings up the Zara murder case to try and paint Gauri as an incompetent investigator and this angers Harsh. On the witness stand, Kamala suddenly remembers that she saw the murder weapon by the body on the day. Madhav and Mandira immediately object to this change in witness testimony but the judge allows it based on Lekha's argument that it was a "trauma flashback". Madhav asks Raj to remember if Kamala has any grudge against him.
6	"Sins of Privileged"	Rohan Sippy	Unknown	19 June 2025
Madhav cross questions Kamala and it is revealed that Raj had refused to loan her 9 lakhs for her sons admission to engineering college. Kamala says that Anju gave her a cheque of 9 lakhs on the day the murder weapon was found. This leads to Kamala's entire testimony to be stricken due to witness tampering. Lekha puts Rajs mom, Gurmeet on the stand and questions the charity the Nagpal family runs. Further questioning reveals that Gurmeet, unbeknownst to Raj, offered Roshni 22 lakhs for her mothers heart operation on the condition that she abort Rajs child.
7	"The Missing link"	Rohan Sippy	Unknown	26 June 2025
Madhavs team finds that, on the night of the party, Roshni ended up at the bar where Digvijay is a regular. On the stand, Digvijay presents a story different from what Raj said, happened on the night of the party when Raj and Roshni had a private argument. Madhav observes some secret communication between Ira and Anju and tries to search for the missing link. Anju whispers some instructions to Mandira. When a lactose intolerant Shivani has a reaction after accidentally drinking Khushboo's coffee, Madhav reviews the contents of the garbage bag to see, that along with the scalpel, a box of lactose free milk and also a medicine used to treat diabetes. Remembering that Ira is also lactose intolerant and was diagnosed to be hypoglycemic, he finally begins to put together the pieces of the puzzle.
8	"The Higher Law"	Rohan Sippy	Unknown	3 July 2025
Mandira puts Ira on the stand in a closed court and Madhav is able to get her to tell the court the secret she and Anju have been hiding, which is that Ira was responsible for breaking the award in which the scalpel was embedded. Trying to sneak up on Roshni, Ira startled her leading to the award falling from the shelf. Roshni then put the scalpel on the shelf while cleaning up the rest of the broken pieces. Madhav then puts Anju on the stand. He hypothesizes that Anju, thinking that Roshni would not show up in the morning to give Ira her meds, went to Raj's flat only to see that Roshni spiking the milk with the diabetic medicine. Roshni still in shock over her forced abortion and thinking that she was losing Raj, was poisoning Ira so she could come closer to the family as her caretaker. In the ensuing scuffle, Anju accidentally cut Roshni's jugular leading to her death. Anju's confesses to the events as described by Madhav. Raj is set free and Anju goes to prison. A few months later, Raj and Ira visit Madhav to pay his fee's and Raj informs him that Anju is dying from stage 4 pancreatic cancer and has been moved to palliative care on compassionate grounds. Raj has stopped practicing, finding himself unable to hold a scalpel. This sets Madhav into thinking. He visits Anju at the hospice and asks her to tell him what really happened. Anju tells him that everything happened as he hypothesized except that it was Raj who accidentally killed Roshni. Anju was aware that she had cancer and did not have long to live so, using her brilliant legal mind, she colluded with Raj to take the blame. She deliberately tampered with Kamala and also instructed Mandira to put Ira on the stand, setting herself up to take the blame so that Ira would have one parent to take care of her. As Madhav walks away, he meets Raj and cryptically tells him that his salvation is possible if he picks up the scalpel again. As Anju meets her family, Madhav who has recorded Anju's confession on tape, deletes the recording and walks away with a smile.

== Production ==
On 17 May 2024, JioHotstar officially announced its fourth season.

== Release ==
On 29 April 2025, JioHotstar released the teaser and announced the release date. The series started streaming on JioHotstar from 29 May 2025.

== Reception ==
Criminal Justice: A Family Matter received a mix of positive reviews from critics and audiences. The performances, especially by Pankaj Tripathi, were widely praised, though the episode release format received criticism from some fans.

=== Critical response ===
The Times of India noted that Pankaj Tripathi's return as Madhav Mishra was "entertaining and impactful," highlighting the show's gripping courtroom drama and strong storytelling.

BollywoodTime.in, a growing entertainment portal, reviewed the series as a "twisting legal drama" with "strong performances and a well-layered plot." The review also noted viewers’ disappointment over the limited episode release.
