= Na Jaane Kaun Aa Gaya =

Hindi film by Vikas Arora

- Theatrical release poster
- Directed by: Vikas Arora
- Written by: Amal Singh; Vikas Arora
- Story by: Amal Singh; Vikas Arora
- Produced by: Vipul Dhawan; Pooja Arora
- Starring: Jatin Sarna; Madhurima Roy; Pranay Pachauri
- Edited by: Vikas Arora
- Music by: Devendra Ahirwar; Prini Siddhant Madhav; Kartik Kush
- Production companies: Dhawan Films; Vikas Arora Films
- Release date: 6 March 2026
- Running time: 125 minutes
- Country: India
- Language: Hindi

Na Jaane Kaun Aa Gaya is an Indian Hindi-language romantic drama film directed and edited by Vikas Arora. The film stars Jatin Sarna, Madhurima Roy, and Pranay Pachauri in lead roles. Produced by Vipul Dhawan and Pooja Arora under the banners of Dhawan Films and Vikas Arora Films, the film is scheduled for a theatrical release on 6 March 2026.

== Plot ==
The story revolves around Kaushal Agarwal (Jatin Sarna), a man whose life is defined by structure and routine, and his wife Tina (Madhurima Roy), a creative and visibility-seeking woman. Their seemingly perfect life is fractured when Tina suddenly disappears, leaving Kaushal to navigate a maze of memories and uncomfortable truths. As he searches for answers, he is forced to confront the complexities of modern commitment and the fragile space between devotion and personal freedom.

== Cast ==
- Jatin Sarna as Kaushal Agarwal
- Madhurima Roy as Tina Agarwal
- Pranay Pachauri as Veer

== Production ==
=== Development ===
The film marks the directorial debut of Vikas Arora, who previously worked as a film editor on projects such as Yaatris (2023).

=== Filming ===
Principal photography took place in the Uttarakhand region, specifically across the hill stations of Bhimtal and Nainital.The scenic backdrop was chosen to contrast with the turbulent emotional journey of the characters.

== Music ==
The music of the film is composed by Devendra Ahirwar, Prini Siddhant Madhav, and Kartik Kush.

== Reception ==
Ronak Kotecha from The Times of India gave the film a 3/5 and wrote, 'Na Jaane Kaun Aa Gaya is a quiet love story with several relatable moments. While it deals with uncomfortable themes like extra-marital relationships and grief, it does so with maturity and understanding, eventually leading the story towards acceptance and closure'. Amit Bhatia from ABP News gave the film 3/5, commented, 'One of the film's strengths lies in how it reflects the emotional pressures of contemporary life. The story touches upon career stress, the constant urge to move ahead, and the effect these pressures have on personal relationships.'

Simran Singh of DNA observed that "Na Jaane Kaun Aa Gaya is an old wine, served in new bottle. The drama is predictable, but what makes it engaging is the realistic performance." Vinamra Mathur of Firstpost gave 3 stars out of 5 and said that "This is not merely a romantic drama; it is a reflective journey into the complexities of companionship, longing, and the subtle ache of emotional distance."
