= Mita Vashisht =

Indian actress

Mita Vasisht
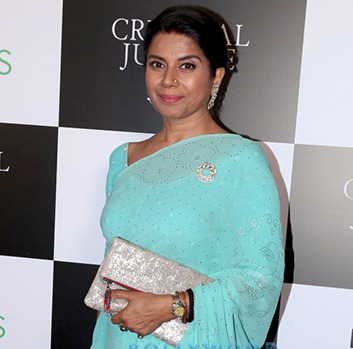
- Vashisht at the screening of Criminal Justice in 2019
- Born: 2 November 1967 (age 58); Pune, Maharashtra, India
- Other name: Meeta Vasisht
- Occupation: Actress
- Years active: 1987–present
- Awards: Screen Awards, BFWA

Mita Vashisht (born 2 November 1967) is an Indian actress. Known for her work on screen, stage and television, she has played a wide range of roles. Her most prominent appearances includes; sci-fi television series Space City Sigma (1989-1991), Pachpan Khambe Laal Deewarein, Swabhimaan, Devyani in Kuch Khatti Kuch Meethi, Alaan (Kirdaar) to Trishna in Kahani Ghar Ghar Ki and Jethi Maa in Kaala Teeka to film roles with a wide spectrum of directors with different cinema styles.

== Early life ==
Mita Vashisht was born on 2 November 1967 in Pune, Maharashtra, India to Captain Rajeshwar Dutt Vashisht, who retired as a colonel from the Indian Army and Meenakshi Mehta (née) Vashisht, a teacher and a singer (Indian Classical).

She graduated from the National School of Drama (Delhi) in 1987 and did her post-graduation in literature from Punjab University, Chandigarh. Vashisht was for several years (1990–2010) also visiting faculty to some of the design, film and theatre institutes of India – the NIFT (Delhi), FTII (Pune), NSD (Delhi) and the NID (Ahmedabad). She has also conducted theatre workshops in the UK (London, Birmingham, Leicester) and in Damascus. She teaches students of fashion design, film direction and acting, using theatre techniques. She is married to filmmaker Anup Singh.

== Career ==
Vashisht has played the lead roles in the avant-garde cinemas (notably Kumar Shahani and Mani Kaul films), the middle of the road cinemas (Notably Govind Nihalani's films) as well as in successful big budget Bollywood films. She has worked in theatre as actress and director too. She researches and writes her scripts as well. Since 2004, she has performed her solo play in English and Hindi, titled, Lal Ded, based on life of medieval Kashmiri mystic Lal Ded, all over India.

Vashisht has written and produced three short films, as well as a serial for television. She was the executive producer of the film The Name of a River, a BFI (London) - NFDC (India) - Bangladesh film co-production.

In June 2001, Vashisht established Mandala, which is a space for arts collaborations research and education. Its aim was to spearhead a new movement in the arts, to centre stage and individuate the performing arts in society and to aid artistic collaborations. Her first project under Mandala however took an unusual twist. A chance theatre workshop that she conducted with trafficked minors in a remand home in Mumbai led to four years of her full-time involvement with the cause of self- empowerment and rehabilitation of trafficked minors. (trafficked minors i.e. minor girls rescued from prostitution from the city brothels).

As artistic director of Mandala she created Mandala TAM (theatre arts module), which is a methodology and a training process based on the performing arts that proved to be highly successful in helping the trafficked minors to heal and transform mentally, physically, emotionally and intellectually.

In 2023, she was appointed by the state of Haryana as the Chairperson of the Governing Council of Haryana Film and Entertainment.

=== Theatre ===
She has performed in the 75 minute solo theatre performance Lal Ded, based on the life and poetry of the iconic woman mystic and poet of Kashmir Lal Ded. Lal Ded performances have been invited to and featured in the following National/International theatre festivals in India and abroad.

- 2004: World Human Rights Day for the NGO 'Akshara', Mumbai.
- 2005: The Hungry Heart Int. Theatre Festival, India Habitat Centre, Delhi.
- 2006: The Hungry Heart International theatre festival, Delhi.
- 2006: World theatre day, Pune. (Alliance Francaise)
- 2007: National Centre for the Performing Arts, Mumbai
- 2008: Baharangam (the Int. theatre festival, NSD Delhi) commemorating NSD's golden jubilee year.
- 2008: International Sufi Festival of Performing Arts, Srinagar, Kashmir.
- 2008: National Theatre Festival, Dehradun
- 2008: World Performing Arts Festival, Lahore, Pakistan.
- 2009: North Zone Cultural Centre Festival, Chandigarh.

=== Film and television ===
Vashisht has produced and directed television programs and documentaries. In 2012 she directed the documentary film She, of the Four Names, commissioned by Public Services Broadcasting Trust, India. (PSBT) based on Lal Ded.

In recent years Vashisht played a key role in Ekta Kapoor's Kahani Ghar Ghar ki. She played the role of the principal on the show Suvreen Guggal on Channel V India and Akbar's evil stepmother in the serial, Jodha Akbar on Zee TV. She was appreciated by the audience for her negative portrayal of Jethi Maa from TV Series Kaala Teeka.

== Selected filmography ==
Key

†	Denotes films that have not yet been released

Year	Film	Role	Notes
1987	Var Var Vari	Nayika	FTII (Diploma for Nandini Bedi, Editing)
1989	Chandni	Chandni's friend	
1989	Siddheshwari	Siddheshwari	
1989	Jazeere	Asta	
1990	Khayal Gatha	Rani Roopmati	
1990	Drishti	Prabha	
1990	Kasba	Tejo	
1991	Idiot	Nastassya	
1994	Tarpan	Lachmi	
1994	English August	Nri	
1994	Drohkaal	Sumitra	Screen Award for Best Supporting Actress
1998	Dil Se..	Terrorist	
1998	Zindagi Zindabad	Botanist	
1998	Ghulam	Fatima	
1999	Taal	Prabha	
2000	Snegithiye	SP Prema Narayanan	Tamil film
2001	Maya	Maya's Aunt	
2001	Kuch Khatti Kuch Meethi	Main villain	
2002	Pitaah	Thakuraien	
2002	Bokshu – The Myth		
2003	Patalghar	Begum	Bengali film
2004	Oops!	Sharon/Sakshi	
2004	Phir Milenge	Advocate Kalyani	
2006	Shevri	Maya	Marathi film
2006	Shaadi Se Pehle		
2007	Raakilipattu	SP Prema Narayanan	Malayalam film
2009	Anubhav	Dr. Kamla	
2009	Aladin	Karate Instructor	
2009	Antaheen	Mrs. Mehra	Bengali film
2011	Mujhse Fraaandship Karoge	Ma'am	
2011	Trishna	Trishna's mother	
2013	Gangoobai	Daksha	
2014	Youngistaan	Suhasini Singh Deo	
2014	Rahasya	Brinda Chhabria	
2021	Kaagaz	Ashrafi Devi	Released on Zee5
2021	Chhorii	Bhanno Devi	Released on Amazon Prime Video
2022	Good Luck Jerry	Sharbati, Jerry's mother	Released on Disney+ Hotstar
2026	Rehmat		World premiere in the main competition of the 79th Locarno Film Festival
2026	Gandhari	Jhunu Amba	Netflix

Music videos and Singing

- 2000: Featured in the main lead in Mann ke Manjeeré.
- 2007: Sung the vocals with Shubha Mudgal for the theme song Laaga Chunari Mein Daag for Yash Raj Films.

== Television ==
Year	Serial	Role	Notes
1989	Space City Sigma		
1989	Bharat Ek Khoj	Suhasini	[episode 11,12]
1989	Mr Yogi		
1993	Pachpan Khambe Lal Deewarein		
1994	Swabhimaan	Devika	
1994	Kirdaar	Various Roles	
1997	Ghum		Rain Movies
1998	Saalgiraah		Rain Movies
1999	Vijay Jyoti		ZEE TV NETWORK
1999	Hip Hip Hurray		
1999–2000	Star Bestsellers		
2001	Kaaun		Balaji Television
2001	Khauff		
2005	Bombay Lawyers		
2005–08	Kahani Ghar Ghar Ki	Trishna Agarwal	Balaji Television
2012–13	Suvreen Guggal – Topper of The Year		
2015	Sense8		NETFLIX
2015	Kaala Teeka	Jethi Maa	DJs a Creative Venture
2015	Jodhaa Akbar	Mah Chuchak Begum	Zee TV Network
2017	Koi Laut Ke Aaya Hai	Bhairavi "Kalyani" Devi	Sphere Origins Production House
2019	Criminal Justice	Mandira Mathur	Hotstar
2020	Your Honor	Kiran Sekhon	Sony LIV
2020	Criminal Justice: Behind Closed Doors	Mandira Mathur	Disney+ Hotstar
2023	Jaanbaaz Hindustan Ke	Mahira Rizvi	ZEE5
2023	Kaala	Chief Minister Jyoti Sen	Disney+Hotstar
2025	Criminal Justice: A Family Matter	Mandira Mathur	JioHotstar

== Film Jury member ==
- 2005: OSIAN'S CINEFAN International Film Festival, Delhi. Jury member for Indian Feature Films.
- 2008: Tenth MAMI International Film Festival, Mumbai. Jury Member for Dimensions India (Documentary films).
- 2008: Mumbai International Film Festival (MIFF) Jury member for Short films.

== Awards ==
- 1996: Won, Star Screen Award, for Best Supporting Actress Drohkaal
- 1990: Won, BFJA Awards Bengal Film Journalist Award, Best supporting Actress Drishti
- 2019 :Won, Moonwhite Films International Film Fest (MWFIFF) Best Actress Supporting Role Mita Vasisht (Gulabi) Kasaai (The Devil)
- 2022 : Filmfare OTT Awards
- Best Supporting Actress in a Web original film - Chhorii.
