= Rakesh Ranjan Kumar =

Indian film director and writer

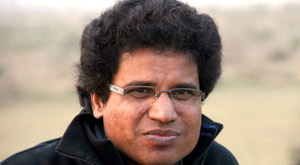
- Rakesh Ranjan Kumar in 2011
- Born: Darbhanga, Bihar
- Occupations: Director, writer
- Years active: 1995–present

Rakesh Ranjan Kumar is an Indian film director and writer. He directed Dear Friend Hitler which was premiered at Cannes Film Festival in 2011. It was described by Duane Byrge as inept, "contrived" and "uber-awful" in The Hollywood Reporter.

Kumar has a post-graduate degree in Hindi Literature from Hindu College, University of Delhi. He participated in several stage plays as director, writer, actor including productions such as Oedipus, Punch Light, Sakharam Binder, Jaati Hi Poocho Sadhu Ki, Holi, Antigone, and West Side Story. He also produced and directed TV serials such as Zameer for DD1 in partnership with Subhash Ghai's Mukta Arts.

He started his filming career as a writer with the Hindi writer Manohar Shyam Joshi and the filmmakers Imtiaz Ali, Anurag Kashyap and Abhinav Kashyap.
