= Phenom (rock group) =

- The 2006 lineup of Phenom. From left to right: Gaurav Joshua Vaz, Jnaneshwar "JD" Das, Mark Lazaro, Trinity "Tiny" D'Souza, and Mrinal Kalakrishnan.

Background information
- Origin: Bangalore, Karnataka, India
- Genre: progressive rock/classic rock
- Years active: 2001–2006
- Label: Independent
- Members: Gaurav Joshua Vaz (Bass); Jnaneshwar "JD" Das (Keyboards); Mark Lazaro (Lead Vocals); Trinity "Tiny" D'Souza (Guitars); Mrinal Kalakrishnan (Drums); Yashraj Jaiswal (Drums and Background musics)
- Past members: Sashi Wapang; Noella D'sa; Deepu Jobie John
- Website: http://WeArePhenom.com

Phenom was a progressive rock group from Bangalore, India, notable for being one of the first Indian rock groups to release their work under a Creative Commons license. Phenom last performed in concert on July 29, 2006.

== Creative Commons ==
On January 26, 2007, Phenom's album Unbound was included on the CD distributed at the Creative Commons India License launch in recognition of it being the first Creative Commons licensed music coming out of India.

== Members ==
=== 2006 Lineup ===
- Gaurav Joshua Vaz – Bass and Backing Vocals
- Mrinal Kalakrishnan – Drums and Backing Vocals
- Jnaneshwar "JD" Das – Keyboards and Backing Vocals
- Trinity "Tiny" D'Souza – Lead Guitar
- Mark Lazaro – Lead Vocals
- Yashraj Jaiswal – Drums and Background musics

=== 2004 Lineup ===
- Gaurav Joshua Vaz – Bass and Lead Vocals
- Sashi Wapang – Lead Guitar and Backing Vocals (left group in June 2004)
- Mrinal Kalakrishnan – Drums and Backing Vocals
- Jnaneshwar "JD" Das – Keyboards and Backing Vocals

=== 2002 Lineup ===
- Gaurav Joshua Vaz – Guitar and Backing Vocals
- Sashi Wapang – Lead Guitar
- Mrinal Kalakrishnan – Drums and Backing Vocals
- Jnaneshwar "JD" Das – Keyboards and Backing Vocals
- Noella D'Sa – Lead Vocals (left group in early 2003)
- Deepu Jobie John – Bass (left group in mid-2002)

== Discography ==
=== 2004: Phenom Unbound ===
The album was released under a Creative Commons license and contained five songs.

- "Unbound"
- "Coloured for this world"
- "CAP 5101"
- "Resurgence"
- "A Little Step"
