= Sacred Games (novel) =

2006 thriller novel by Vikram Chandra

- Author: Vikram Chandra
- Language: English
- Genre: Novels
- Publisher: HarperCollins
- Publication date: 2006
- Publication place: India
- Media type: Print (Hardcover)
- Pages: 928 pages
- ISBN: 0-06-113035-4
- OCLC: 74556544
- Dewey Decimal: 823/.92 22
- LC Class: PS3553.H27165 S23 2007

Sacred Games is a mystery/thriller novel by Indian-American author Vikram Chandra published in 2006. Upon release, it received critical acclaim and subsequently won the Vodafone Crossword Book Award.

== Premise ==
Sacred Games runs mostly on two parallel tracks. One winding through the criminal underworld of Mumbai (then Bombay) in the 1980s and 1990s, and the other through a tense modern-day hunt for the explanation behind a notorious dead gangster's bizarre final words. The only Sikh police officer in the city, Inspector Sartaj Singh, is seemingly invited to pursue Mumbai's most legendary crime boss Ganesh Gaitonde. Gaitonde reveals a harrowing timeline and a few hints of the identity of his collaborators before taking his own life.

== Publication history ==
The book earned Chandra a rumored US$1 million advance from HarperCollins. The initial print run was 200,000 copies. However, the book sold less than expected and it is estimated that the advance gained $655,750. It was critically praised, winning the 2006 Vodafone Crossword Book Award.

== Adaptation ==
Netflix, in partnership with Phantom Films, announced Sacred Games, a Netflix Original series based on the novel in June 2016. The series, primarily in Hindi, was shot on location in India, and released worldwide on Netflix on 6 July 2018. The series features Saif Ali Khan as police officer Sartaj Singh, Nawazuddin Siddiqui as gangster Ganesh Gaitonde and Radhika Apte as RAW analyst Anjali Mathur. The series consists of eight episodes of 45 minutes each directed by Anurag Kashyap and Vikramaditya Motwane. In an interview published on DNA, Saif Ali Khan claimed that Sacred Games will be a four part series.

== Awards and nominations ==
- 2007: Awarded Salon Book Award
- 2007: Nominated National Book Critics Circle Award
- 2006: Awarded Hutch Crossword Book award

== See also ==
- Shantaram
- Maximum City
