= Kishore Dang =

Indian director

Kishore Dang is an Indian director. He has a long career in TV shows, production and filmmaking. Dang was a member of the Jury of the 53rd National Film Awards organized by the Government of India. Dang has been associated with foreign films such as Gandhi, The Far Pavilions, Kim, Mountbatten: The Last Viceroy, The Deceivers, The Young Indiana Jones Chronicles, In Custody and The Jungle Book. He has been associated with the Theatre Group “Ank” for four years that was led by Dinesh Thakur. His television shows include Maila Aanchal, Nooriee, Uttarkatha, Humsafar The Train, Detective Karan and Faujji...The Iron Man. He directed documentary film Kab Tak that participated in Mumbai International Film Festival 2012. Other films include Aakhri Dastak - a film made for the Indian Army.

== Early life ==
Dang left home at age 19. He met producer Suresh Jindal (producer of Rajnigandha, Katha and Shatranj Ke Khiladi and other works). He introduced Dang to Charles Torbett who made him the assistant of Tony Teiger (stand-by prop man of Gandhi).

== Career ==
=== Major work ===
Dang became a director. He started out by contributing to foreign films. Then, he began producing TV shows. His first, Maila Aanchal, aired on DD National in 1990. He directed many other serials. He acted in a serial, Space City Sigma.

Dang also made documentary films. Some of those are: Sugalis/Lambadis, The Yaravas Of Coorg and Kab-Tak. Kab-Tak (35mm Cinemascope Duration 2 Minutes) is a short, competition film, that participated in The Mumbai International Film Festival 2012. Dang directed a short movie called Aakhri Dastak for the Indian Army.

== Filmography ==
=== TV serials ===
- Maila Aanchal
- Abhimaan
- Station Master
- The Living Traditions (Jeeti Jaagti Paramparain)
- Daastan
- Ek Gulab Ka Khoon
- Humsafar - The Train
- Jehara
- Subahah
- Detective Karan
- Detective Jai
- Karan The Detective
- Faujji...The Iron Man
- Uttar Katha
- Nooriee
- Rukhsana
- Parag Goswami - The Detective
- Zara Thehro
- Praarabdh
- Maare Gaye Gulfaam
- Bazm-E-Charaghan

=== Documentaries ===
- Sugalis / Lambadis
- The Yaravas Of Coorg
- Fun-Flying
- Showcase India
- Slum Sanitation

=== Associated with foreign feature films ===
- Gandhi Indo British Films Limited, London (UK)
- Bengal Lancers Stephen Weeks Company, (UK)
- Kim London Films International Limited, London (UK)
- Mountbatten: The Last Viceroy George Walker Productions Ltd., Middlesex (UK)
- The Deceivers Merchant Ivory Production (US)
- The Adventures of Young Indiana Jones Worldwide Productions Ltd., California (US)
- The Jungle Book (Live) Baloo Productions Inc., Middlesex (UK)
- The Far Pavilions Geoff Reeve & Associates Ltd., London (UK)
- In Custody Merchant Ivory Productions (US)
- Kasmir Short Cut Films (Germany)
- West Myth Nitrate Films (Germany)
- AT&T Emerald Films, New York (US)

=== Short films ===
- Aakhri Dastak a film on HIV/AIDS for Ministry of Defence.
- Kab-Tak a film on child labour for Films Division

== Recognition ==
- NIFA Award for the Best Show from The Honourable Union Minister of Information & Broadcasting for Maila Aanchal.
- Best TV. Show, Karan The Detective, in 2005 and in 2007, respectively.
