= Zindagi Dot Com =

Zindagi Dot Com is an educational television series broadcast on Doordarshan. By 17 August 2014, Doordarshan began the series "Zindagi Dot Com" with the intent of increasing knowledge of an e-governance plan in the country. Zindagi Dot Com is the production of the National Film Development Corporation of India (NFDC), there will be an estimated 39 episodes.
