= ITA Award for Best Drama Jury =

Indian Television Academy Award

ITA Award for Best Show Popular
- Description: Best Show Popular
- Sponsored by: Indian Television Academy
- First award: 2001
- Final award: 2024

Highlights
- Total awarded: 21
- First Winner: Justujoo (2001)
- Last Winner: Udne Ki Aasha(2024)
- Website: http://indiantelevisionacademy.com

ITA Award for Best Drama Jury is an award given by Indian Television Academy as a part of its annual event. The winners are decided by the Jury.

== Winners ==
Year	Show	Production House	Channel	Ref
2001	Justujoo	Sangita Sinha & Saurabh Agrawal	Zee TV	
2002	CID	B. P. Singh, Pradeep Uppoor	Sony Entertainment Television	
2003	Haqeeqat	BAG Films	Sahara One	
2004	Jassi Jaissi Koi Nahin	DJ's a Creative Unit	Sony Entertainment Television	
2005	Siddhant	BAG Films	Star One	
2006	Kasamh Se	Balaji Telefilms	Zee TV	
2007	Baa Bahoo Aur Baby	Jamnadas Majethia, Aatish Kapadia	Star Plus	
2008	Balika Vadhu	Sphere Origins	Colors TV	
2009	Balika Vadhu	Sphere Origins	Colors TV	
2009	Agle Janam Mohe Bitiya Hi Kijo	Swastik Pictures	Zee TV	
2010	Sasural Genda Phool	Ravi Ojha Productions	Star Plus	
2011	Bade Achhe Lagte Hain	Balaji Telefilms	Sony Entertainment Television	
2012	Parvarrish – Kuchh Khattee Kuchh Meethi	DJ's a Creative Unit	Sony Entertainment Television	
2013	Ek Veer Ki Ardaas...Veera	Yash Patnaik, Mamta Patnaik, Mukesh Mishra	Star Plus	
2014	Ek Hasina Thi	Prem Krishen	Star Plus	
2015	Not Awarded			
2016	Naagin 1	Balaji Telefilms	Colors TV	
2017	P.O.W. – Bandi Yuddh Ke	Monisha Advani, Madhu G Bhojwani	Star Plus	
2018	Kullfi Kumarr Bajewala	4 Lions Films, Invictus T Mediaworks	Star Plus	
2019	Tara From Satara	Frames Production, IdeaRack Private Limited	Sony Entertainment Television	
2020	Not Awarded			
2021	Anupamaa	Director's Kut Productions	Star Plus	
2022	Imlie	Gul Khan	Star Plus	
2023	Katha Ankahee	Sphere Origins	Sony Entertainment Television	
2024	Udne Ki Aasha	Rolling Tales Production	Star Plus	

== See also ==
- ITA Award for Best Show Popular
- ITA Award for Best Actor Popular
- ITA Award for Best Actress Popular
- ITA Award for Best Actor Drama
- ITA Award for Best Actress Drama
