= ITA Award for Best Director Drama =

Indian Television Academy award

ITA Award for Best Director - Drama
- Awarded for: Best Direction in a Drama Television Series
- Country: India
- Presented by: Indian Television Academy
- First award: 2001
- Final award: 2023

Highlights
- Total Awarded: 24
- First Winner: Ajai Sinha for Justujoo (2001)
- Last Winner: Ravi Bhushan for Katha Ankahee (2023)

ITA Award for Best Director - Drama is an award given by Indian Television Academy as a part of its annual event.

== Winners ==
Year	Director	Show	Channel	Reference
2001	Ajai Sinha	Justujoo	Zee TV	
2002	Sourabh Narang	Haqeeqat	Sahara One	
2003	Gautam Sobti	Kasautii Zindagii Kay	Star Plus	
2004	Gautam Sobti	Kasautii Zindagii Kay	Star Plus	
2005	Nand Kumar Kale	Special Squad	Star One	
2006	Sumitra Bhave & Sunil Sukthankar	Kaun Jeeta Kaun Hara	DD National	
2007	Gautam Sobti	Kasautii Zindagii Kay	Star Plus	
2008	Sidharth Sengupta & Pradeep Yadhav	Balika Vadhu	Colors TV	
2009	Sidharth Sengupta & Pradeep Yadhav	Balika Vadhu	Colors TV	
2010	Rajesh Ram Singh	Agle Janam Mohe Bitiya Hi Kijo	Zee TV	
2011	Ravindra Gautam	Bade Achhe Lagte Hain	Sony TV	
2011	Imtiaz Punjabi	Maryada: Lekin Kab Tak?	Star Plus	
2012	Imtiaz Punjabi	Parvarrish – Kuchh Khattee Kuchh Meethi	Sony TV	
2013	Rohit Raj Goyal	Diya Aur Baati Hum	Star Plus	
2013	Waseem Sabir	Ek Veer Ki Ardaas...Veera	Star Plus	
2014	Abhinay Deo	24	Colors TV	
2015	Sidharth Sengupta	Balika Vadhu	Colors TV	
2016	Rensil D'Silva	24 Season 2	Colors TV	
2017	Siddharth Kumar Tewary	Shani	Colors TV	
2018	Aniruddha Rajderkar	Bepannaah	Colors TV	
2019	Prateek Sharma	Bahu Begum	Colors TV	
2020	Not Awarded			
2021	Vikram Ghai	Kashibai Bajirao Ballal	Zee TV	
2022	Sohail Tatari	Swaraj	DD National	
2023	Ravi Bhushan	Katha Ankahee	Sony TV	
2024	Sangieta Rao	Megha Barsenge	Colors TV	
