= Kaantaye Kaantaye =

Indian Bengali-language web-series

- Genre: Suspense Thriller
- Inspired by: Sonar Kaanta
- Written by: Narayan Sanyal
- Screenplay by: Padmanabha Dasgupta
- Directed by: Joydeep Mukherjee
- Starring: Saswata Chatterjee; Ananya Chatterjee; Payel Sarkar; Soham Chakraborty; Mir Afsar Ali; Somraj Maity; Ayoshi Talukdar
- Music by: Sovon Mukherjee
- Country of origin: India
- Original language: Bengali
- No. of episodes: 10

Production
- Producer: Shyam Sundar Dey
- Editor: Maloy Laha
- Production company: Shadow Films

Original release
- Network: ZEE5
- Release: 15 August 2024 – 2024

Kaantaye Kaantaye is Bengali suspense-thriller web-series directed by Joydeep Mukherjee and produced by Shyamsundar De. It is an adaptation of Narayan Sanyal's P. K. Basu series novel Sonar Kaanta, which is actually inspired by The Mousetrap of Agatha Christie. This is the second time P. K. Basu series has been adapted for the screen, the first time being in 1974 when Tarun Majumdar made Jadi Jantem featuring Uttam Kumar as the protagonist.

The series was released on 15 August 2024.

== Cast ==
- Saswata Chatterjee as P.K.Basu
- Ananya Chatterjee as Rani Basu
- Payel Sarkar as Kaveri Dutta Gupta
- Soham Chakraborty as Subir Roy
- Mir Afsar Ali as Inspector Nripen Ghoshal
- Somraj Maity as Koushik Mitra
- Ayoshi Talukdar as Sujata Chatterjee
- Subrat Dutta as Raman Guha
- Abhijit Guha as Arup
- Rachel White as Neena Basu
- Prantik Banerjee as Ajoy Roy
- Kinjal Nanda as Noor Ali Baig

== Casting ==
A movie adaption of the same story was announced in 2018, starring Ranjit Mullick as PK Basu. The rest of the cast included Rachel White. The film never released. In 2022, ZEE5 announced that they were working on a web series around the same story with Saswata Chatterjee as the protagonist. Rachel White was announced to be a part of the cast of the series as well.

== Marketing ==
The teaser of Kaantaye Kaantaye was released on 25 July 2024. The trailer was released on 31 July.

== Reception ==
Kaantaye Kaantaye received mixed reviews. The Times of India gave it 3.5 stars out of 5 calling it a " binge-worthy watch". Subhash K. Jha writing for Times Now also gave it a thumbs up, commenting, "Apart from some good performances, Kaantaye Kaantaye plays some ear-soothing songs in the background about grief, loss and hope."

Scroll.in on the other hand was critical about the series and called it "An overstretched whodunit". HT Media too gave it a 2 out of 5 and termed the show a missable.

== See also ==
- Feluda
- Byomkesh Bakshi
- Dipak Chatterjee
- Parashor Barma
