= Tamanna (TV series) =

- Genre: Indian soap opera
- Written by: Saumya Joshi; Jigna Vyas; Rushik Rawal
- Directed by: Waseem Sabir
- Starring: Anuja Sathe; Deepak Wadhwa; Vishal Gandhi; Kiran Karmarkar; Ketki Dave; Ram Kapoor
- Composer: Dony Hazarika
- Country of origin: India
- Original language: Hindi
- No. of seasons: 1
- No. of episodes: 143

Production
- Producers: Abhinay Deo; Ajinkya Deo
- Production locations: Jamnagar; Mumbai
- Running time: 21 minutes
- Production company: Ramesh Deo Productions

Original release
- Network: Star Plus
- Release: 1 February – 26 June 2016

Tamanna (English: Dreams Come True) is an Indian Hindi television soap opera which aired on Star Plus from 1 February 2016 to 26 June 2016. It follows the journey of Dharaa who aspires to become a cricketer, breaking the norms of her family and society with her father's support.

== Synopsis ==
The story revolves around Dharaa who wants to become a cricketer and the sacrifices she has to make in order to achieve her dream. Dharaa is supported by her father and soon convinces her grandmother about playing cricket. She continues playing well and a promising future seemed to lie ahead. But the sudden deterioration of her father's health convinces her to agree to marry Mihir soon, a guy with whom her alliance was going to be fixed. She is initially happy and continues playing cricket, but soon realises her husband's chauvinistic side. He treats Dharaa like a prisoner and controls her. He even went to the extent of doubting her character, and feels that Shubhangi, his and Dharaa's daughter, is not his but Diwakar's, his boss and their neighbour. Fed up of Mihir's possessive nature and insulting behaviour, Dharaa divorces Mihir.

After that M.N.Roy gives Dharaa a job as a cricket coach in a school in Merut. Seeing the bitterness between the Hindu and Muslim students she decides to first make one single team and she succeeds in it but because of a little war between the two players Sanjay and Salamat causes riots again in Bulandganj. She decides to resign but the students apologize to her and then she starts to coach them again. Mihir arrives in Bulandganj and is gathering evidences to portray Dharaa as an irresponsible mother to gain Shubhangi's custody. But Dharaa convinces the judge of her capability of single-parenting alongside her coaching. Mihir then realises his mistake and walks away. Bhanu Pratap and Khan conspire to make riots and assault Bashir and kill Gafur but later get arrested. During this Sanjay and Salamat become friends, and Mridula gives birth to a baby boy at the same time. Dharaa's team gets selected in the tournament and they slog hard and win the trophy. Mihir comes back to Dharaa but Dharaa turns him down and returns to Jamnagar.

== Cast ==
- Anuja Sathe as Dharaa Solanki
- Harshita Ojha as Young Dharaa
- Deepak Wadhwa as Sanjay Pratap Singh
- Ram Kapoor as Avinash Arora
- Vishal Gandhi as Mihir Shukhadia: Dharaa's ex-husband
- Ketki Dave as Baa
- Kiran Karmarkar as Deepak Solanki: Dharaa's father
- Ruchi Savarn as Mridula: Dharaa Friend, Sameer's wife
- Sailesh Gulabani as Sameer: Mridula's husband
- Rajlaxmi Solanki as Dharaa's mother
- Ashish Vidyarthi as young Dharaa's coach
- Harsh Chhaya as Coach Roy
- Seema Deo as Roy's mother
- Nimisha Vakharia as Mihir's mother
- Hitesh Rawal as Vijay Agnihotri: Mihir's father
- Sudhanshu Pandey as Diwakar Limaye: Mihir's New Boss
- Anchal Sabharwal as Lavanya
- Rajesh Khera as Advocate
- Rohit Chandel as Imran
- Pankaj Berry as Bhanu Pratap
- Raju Kher as the school principal
- Anang Desai as Pandit Chaurasia
- Bhavin Bhanushali as Bashir Khan
- Himanshu Arora as Arjun Singh
- Tushaar Bhan as Balram
- Tashvi Thakker as Shubhangi: Dharaa's daughter
- Aarav Mavi as Amir
- Gurpreet Valiya as Sultan
- Jayesh Kardak as Veer
- Vijay Raval as Razaq
- Miraj Joshi as Virat Sharma
- Saurabh Pratap as Parvez
- Shankar Sachdev as Mishra
- Prithvi Zutshi as Teacher
- Shishir Sharma as Coach at Mumbai
- Unknown as Gaffur
- Hrithvik Patil as Manoj

=== Guests ===
- Sonali Kulkarni as Dharaa's Advocate
- Kiran More as himself

== Production ==
The series was launched on 21 January 2016 in Mumbai.

Before its premiere, initially titled as Badal Pe Paun Hai, later was renamed as Tamanna due to astrological reason.

The story is set in Jamnagar, Gujarat. The series was filmed in Gujarat and Mumbai. It was a planned finite series which was expected to end on May, but popular demand paved way for its extension till June.

The title track was composed by Suhail Zargar.

== Reception ==
In March 2016, Daily News and Analysis, in their list of 10 female characters of Indian television who stand out progressive, included the lead character Dhara among others stating her ambition as unique.

Hindustan Times stated the story as refreshing and criticised, "The narrative and pace of the show, which took a while to reach the crux of the story."
