= P. K. Basu =

- P. K. Basu character
- Created by: Narayan Sanyal
- Portrayed by: Uttam Kumar

In-universe information
- Full name: Prasanna Kumar Basu
- Gender: Male
- Title: Bose (Basu)
- Occupation: Lawyer (Barrister), Investigator
- Religion: Hindu
- Home: Kolkata
- Nationality: Indian

P. K. Basu is a fictional detective character created by Bengali writer Narayan Sanyal. These detective stories are popularly known as the Kanta (Thorn) series. Some of the stories were inspired by the novels of Erle Stanley Gardner and Agatha Christie.

== Character ==
The writer often referred Basu as 'The Perry Mason of the East', since Sanyal was inspired to create the character from the masterpiece of Erle Stanley Gardner. Basu's full name is Prasanna Kumar Basu and by profession he is an indomitable criminal side barrister of the Calcutta High Court. In the first story named Nagchampa, Basu is shown to be an old, unmarried man but since the novel of Sonar Kanta, the writer changed the character of Basu to an aged Barrister, whose wife Ranu is physically challenged & Suborna alias Mithu, their only daughter, has died in a car accident. P. K. Basu is not a professional detective but solves the cases through discussion and in courtroom drama. A young couple, Koushik and Sujata, live with Basu's family in his house. They form a private detective agency, Sukoushali. Very often, Basu takes their help in investigation.

== Stories ==
- Nagchampa (Published: 1968)
- Sonar Kanta (Published: 1974; Inspired by The Mousetrap by Agatha Christie)
- Machher Kanta (Published: March 1975)
- Pother Kanta (Published: January 1976)
- Ghorir Kanta (Published: January 1977)
- Kuler Kanta (Published: May 1978)
- Uler Kanta (Published: May 1980, Inspired by The Case of the Perjured Parrot by Erle Stanley Gardner)
- O-Aa-Ko Khuner Kanta (Published: 1987, Inspired by The A.B.C. Murders by Agatha Christie)
- Sarmeyo Genduker Kanta (Published: 1989, Inspired by Dumb Witness by Agatha Christie)
- Ristedarer Kanta (Published: 1992; Inspired by: The Case of the Beautiful Beggar by Erle Stanley Gardner).
- Koutuholi Koner Kanta (Published: 1993; Inspired by: The Case of the Curious Bride by Erle Stanley Gardner)
- Jadu Eto Boro Ronger Kanta (Published 1993)
- Abhi Purbak Nee Dhatu O-er Kanta (Published in 1994, Inspired by The Case of the Restless Redhead by Erle Stanley Gardner)
- Nyay Nishtha Nyasnasheer Kanta (Published: 1994)
- Dwi Boibahik Kanta (Published 1994)Inspired by The Case of Bigamous spouse by Erle Stanley Gardner
- Jom Duare Porlo Kanta (Published in 1994)
- Bisher Kanta (Published: 1996) Inspired by: The Case of the Lucky Legs by Erle Stanley Gardner
- Dress Reharshal-er Kanta (Inspired by: Three Act Tragedy by Agatha ChristiePublished: 1998)
- Darpone Pratibimbito Kanta (Published: 1999)
- Sokol Kanta Dhyonyo Kore (Published: 1999)
- Chnaparonger Murshidabadi Sharir Kanta (Published: 2001)
- Monalisa'r Kanta (Published: 2001)
- Iskapan Bibir Kanta (Published: 2001, Inspired by The King of Clubs by Agatha Christie)
- Haripada Keranir Kanta (Published: January 2001)

== Adaptation ==
- The first story of P. K. Basu Nagchampa was adapted in a Bengali movie named Jadi Jantem, which was released on 1 March 1974. This film was directed by Yatrik (Tarun Majumdar) and starred by Uttam Kumar as P. K. Basu, Ruma Guha Thakurta as Ranu, Soumitra Chatterjee as Koushik and Supriya Choudhury as Sujata. Narayan Sanyal himself wrote the dialogues.
- In 2018, director Haranath Chakraborty set a film titled Kantaye Kantaye based on the story Haripada Keranir Kaanta. Ranjit Mallick has been roped in for the role of P. K. Basu, but the film has not been released.
- A web series directed by Joydeep Mukherjee titled Kaantaye Kaantaye was released on 15 August 2024. This film is based on Sonar Kanta and Saswata Chatterjee plays the role of P. K. Basu.
