= Ek Chutki Aasman =

- Screenplay by: Paushali Ganguli
- Story by: Preeti Mamgain
- Starring: See below
- Country of origin: India
- Original language: Hindi
- No. of episodes: 68

Production
- Running time: 24 minutes
- Production company: Sphere Origins

Original release
- Network: Sahara One
- Release: 23 August – 16 December 2010

Ek Chutki Aasman (transl. A pinch of sky) is an Indian soap opera which aired on Sahara One in 2010.

== Plot ==
This story is about a seven-year-old girl named Chutki. She brings happiness everywhere she goes. The story takes a turn when she goes to Mumbai to try find her mother but gets lost.

== Cast ==
- Chhavi Mittal as Himangi Agashe
- Rajesh Shringarpure as Ganesh
- Deiptimaan Chowdhury as Arjun
- Roshni Parekh as Chutki
- Seerat Ain Alam as Sonali
- Pritish Roy as Bablya
- Amar Sharma as Anjali's Husband
- Smriti Mohan as Anjali
- Manav Sohal as Ramakant
- Rajeev Bharadwaj as Aaji's Elder Son
- Alok Narula
- Rajeev Aryan as Advocate
