= Biswasghatak =

Novel by Narayan Sanyal

Bishwasghatak
- Author: Narayan Sanyal
- Illustrator: Narayan Sanyal
- Cover artist: Khaled Chowdhury
- Language: Bengali
- Genre: Novel
- Publisher: Dey's Publishing
- Publication date: 1974
- Publication place: India
- Media type: Print (Hardcover)
- Pages: 255
- ISBN: 978-81-295-0868-3

Biswasghatak is a 1974 Bengali novel by Narayan Sanyal based on the events related to the Atomic Bomb under the Manhattan Project.

== Synopsis ==
The Bengali term biswasghatak literally means 'traitor'. After the end of the Second World War, a scientist, Klaus Fuchs, supplied confidential information to the USSR on his own efforts by averting the ever alert eyes of the United States Government. In the history of mankind this is supposed to be the biggest treason in terms of economic evaluation.
