= Roma Arora =

Indian television actress

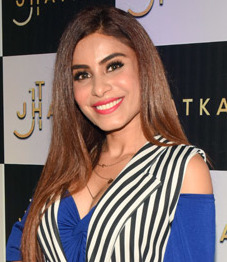
- Roma Arora graces the launch of Jhatka club in 2019
- Born: 15 September 1997 (age 28); Delhi, India
- Occupation: Television actress
- Years active: 2015–present

Roma Arora is an Indian television actress. She has appeared on the serial Kundali Bhagya. She has also appeared in television shows like Dreamgirl on Life OK.

== Career ==
Born to doctor Parents in Delhi, Roma Arora is a Homeopathic physician who chose acting and modeling over medicine. She has been featured in TV advertisements for products such Oral B toothpaste, and Valvoline motor oil with Virat Kohli. She has also done photo shoots for magazines like Woman's Era.

She also appeared with Vivek Oberoi in Amazon's first original Indian film – Inside Edge - where she played a journalist named Ritika Jain. In the upcoming Colors TV show, Khauff, Roma Arora will be playing the role of a killer ghost.

== Television ==
- Kundali Bhagya
- CID
- Nisha Aur Uske Cousins
- Kaun Hai?
- Udaan
- NRI Haadsa (2020)
- Katha Ankahee (2023)
