= Chhoti Anandi =

- Created by: Anish Patel
- Developed by: Anish Patel
- Written by: Marmabandha Gavhane
- Voices of: Devyani Dagaonkar
- Country of origin: India
- Original language: Hindi
- No. of seasons: 1
- No. of episodes: 26

Production
- Producers: Sunjoy Waddhwa; Comall Sunjoy Waddhwa
- Production company: Sphere Origins

Original release
- Network: Colors TV; Rishtey
- Release: 17 January – 10 April 2016

Chhoti Anandi (transl. Little Anandi) is a 2016 Indian Hindi-language animated television series produced by Sphere Origins, and animated by HopMotion. The show was simulcasted on Colors TV and Rishtey. This series aired on from 17 January 2016 to 10 April 2016. The show showcases the story of Anandi from the Balika Vadhu television series before she was married.

== Synopsis ==
Anandi is a wise and mischievous eight-year-old girl. She with her 4 friends Nattu, Chikku, Phuli and Champa form the Chhote Sipahi group and courageously face difficult situations and emerge victorious.

== Characters ==
- Anandi: Anandi is a beautiful, eight-year-old righteous and courageous girl. She is very wise and solves everyone's problems. She is voiced by Devyani Dagaonkar.
- Phuli: Phuli is Anandi's best friend and her right hand. She charms everyone with her innocence and cuteness and is very gullible and naive.
- Nattu: Nattu is very competitive. He tries to outdo and always opposes Anandi.
- Champa: Champa is the oldest member of the group. She is conformist and very practical. She likes to stay pretty.
- Chiku: Chiku is the youngest and the most mischievous member of the group. He is also Nattu's brother. He likes to be with Choti Annandi and Nattu.
- Goli: He is boy who lives in Balaria. He is tall and thin. He wears a golden chain. He wears orange shirt and black pants. His father is "Chaudhri" of Balaria. He feels enmity towards Chhoti Anandi. He has two goons named Changu and Mangu. They call Goli "Goli Sarkar". He speaks Harayanvi.
- Changu and Mangu: Changu and Mangu are the two goons. They wear turbans. They call Goli 'Goli sarkar'. Both of them have moustaches.

== Accolades ==
The show won FICCI BAF award in the category of The New Animation Entrant in 2016.
