= Vishal Gandhi =

Indian Actor

- Born: Vishal Gandhi; November 7 Mumbai, India
- Education: National College, Mumbai
- Occupations: Model, actor
- Years active: 2008–present
- Known for: Pyaar Kii Ye Ek Kahaani; Tamanna; Aahat; Tose Naina Milaike

Vishal Gandhi is an Indian television actor known for his work across television and digital platforms. He is best known for playing Kabir Singh Rathod in Pyaar Ki Ye Ek Kahaani.

Over the years, he has appeared in a range of roles, including Raghav in Aahat and Mihir Sukhadia in Tamanna. He also featured as Paras Patel in the Gujarati political thriller Kshadyantra on ShemarooME and as Tejvardhan Ahlawat in Meet: Badlegi Duniya Ki Reet.

In Tose Naina Milaai Ke, he played Rajeev Narayan Chandel. He later returned to the series in a lead role as Yuvraj Singh Choudhary for its second season Tose Naina Milaike 2.0. He has also portrayed Aarambh in Safal Hogi Teri Aradhana on Dangal TV.

== Early life and career ==
Vishal Gandhi was born in Mumbai and graduated from National College, Mumbai. He started his career as a child actor in Ekka Raja Rani (1994). He went on to play Lead roles in Bandhan Saat Janamon Ka, Ek Doosre Se Karte Hain Pyaar Hum, Tamanna, Tose Naina Milai Ke, parallel lead in Pyaar Kii Ye Ek Kahaani and several important characters in various shows.

== Television ==
| Year | Serial | Role | Notes | Ref. |
|---|---|---|---|---|
| 2008–2009 | Bandhan Saat Janamon Ka | Parth | Lead Role | |
| 2009–2010 | Aahat | Raghav | Season 4 | |
| 2010–2011 | Pyaar Kii Ye Ek Kahaani | Kunwar Kabir Singh Rathod | Parallel Lead role | |
| 2012 | Ek Doosre Se Karte Hain Pyaar Hum | Aniket Majumdar | Lead Role | |
| 2013 | Ek Thhi Naayka | Veer | | |
| 2013 | Haunted Nights | Kunal | Episode: "Kaun Hai Woh?" | |
| 2013 | Rangrasiya | Varun | | |
| 2014 | MTV Fanaah | Adhrij | | |
| 2014 | Pyaar Tune Kya Kiya | Harsh | | |
| 2014 | Khushiyon Kii Gullak Aashi | Aryan | | |
| 2015 | Code Red | Adeeb | | |
| 2016 | Tamanna | Mihir Sukhadia | Negative Role | |
| 2017 | Sarabhai VS Sarabhai | Director | Season 2, Episode 9 | |
| 2018 | Kaun Hai? | Viren | | |
| 2021–2022 | Meet: Badlegi Duniya Ki Reet | Tej Ahlawat | | |
| 2022 | Mose Chhal Kiye Jaaye | Vihan | | |
| 2022–2023 | Katha Ankahee | Dr. Amit Rawal | | |
| 2023–2024 | Tose Naina Milai Ke | Rajeev Narayan Chandel | Lead Role | |
| 2025 | Safal Hogi Teri Aradhana | Aarambh | Lead Role - Negative | |
| 2026 | Tose Naina Milai Ke 2 | Yuvraj Singh Chaudary | Lead Role | |

=== Web series ===
| Year | Title | Role | Language | Ref. |
|---|---|---|---|---|
| 2021 | Kshadyantra | Paras Patel | Gujarati | |

=== Music videos ===
| Year | Title | Artist | Ref. |
|---|---|---|---|
| 2020 | Kaanton Ki Chubhan | Pratibha Baghel | |
