= Narayan Sanyal =

Indian writer (1923–2005)

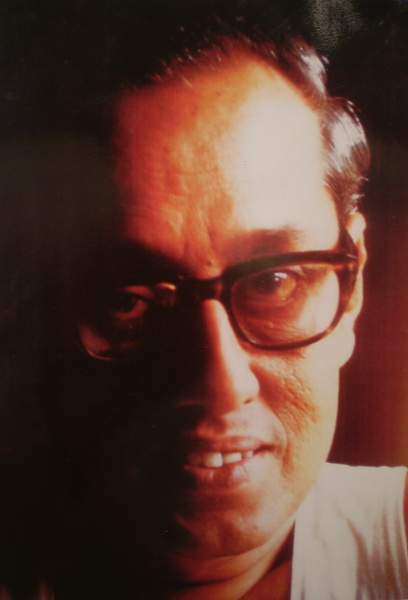
- Born: 26 April 1923; Hindmotor, Bengal Presidency, British India
- Died: 7 February 2005 (aged 81); Kolkata, West Bengal, India

Narayan Sanyal (26 April 1923 – 7 February 2005) was an Indian writer of modern Bengali literature and a civil engineer.

== Biography ==
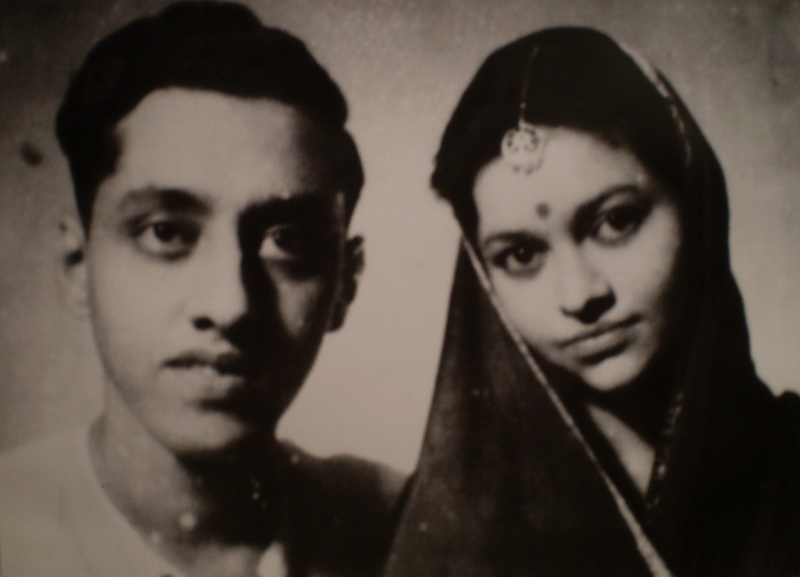
Narayan Sanyal with his wife Sabita Sanyal

Narayan Sanyal was born in Hindmotor to Chittasukh Sanyal and Basantalata Devi. His name was initially Narayandas Sanyal in school life. His family consisted of wife Sabita Sanyal; elder daughter Anindita Basu, son-in-law Amitabha Basu, son Tirtharenu Sanyal, daughter-in-law Sharmila Sanyal, younger daughter Mou Sanyal Talukdar, son-in-law Soumitra Talukdar. His granddaughter is Ayoshi Talukdar.

Although Sanyal is known mostly as a novelist, he was also a civil engineer by profession. After graduating in science from the University of Calcutta, he received a Bachelor of Engineering from Bengal Engineering College in 1948. Thereafter, he joined Public Works Department and later National Buildings Organisation, Ministry of Works and Housing, Eastern Region, India. He was a Fellow of the Institution of Engineers (India) and a Fellow of the Association of Engineers (India). He also wrote books in Civil Engineering such as Vaastu Vigyan.

A biography of Narayan Sanyal was written by Pradip Dutta – Ami Narayan Sanyal Ke Dekhechi.

A Documentary on Writer Narayan Sanyal was screened on the 18th Kolkata International Film Festival on 15 November 2012 at Bangla Academy . The film " CHOKHER DEKHA PRANER KOTHA .... Narayan Sanyal " in Bengali named by his elder son-in-law Amitabha basu, was directed by his younger son-in-law Soumitra Talukdar and produced by his younger daughter Mou Sanyal.

== Overview of his works ==
Sanyal wrote numerous books that dealt with various topics, such as children, science, art, architecture, travels, psychiatry, technology, refugee problems, history, biographical pieces, encyclopaedia of animals, social novel, and other Devadasi-related works.

This author also preferred writing books inspired by many world-famous works. One of his popular sci-fiction books, Nakshatraloker Debatatma [নক্ষত্রলোকের দেবতাত্মা], is based on the transformation of the human race from primitive creatures to civilised intelligent species controlling the whole earth. It also examines Jupiter exploration and a super intelligent computer, HAL. The three-part book is an inspiration of 2001: A Space Odyssey by Arthur C. Clarke. In his book, Sanyal named HAL as Jantra-Na, in his mother tongue Bengali, it ambiguously means 'not a machine' as well as 'pain'.

His most popular work is Biswasghatak [বিশ্বাসঘাতক] written about the Manhattan project that developed the first US atom bomb. This book is based on the likeness of Brighter than a Thousand Suns: A Personal History of the Atomic Scientists (1970), by Austrian Robert Jungk.

Another book Timi Timingil is on whales. This stands on an article published in Reader's Digest.

He also wrote a series of detective fiction stories called the Kanta [কাঁটা] (Thorn) series. Most of the stories were inspired from various foreign novels of Erle Stanley Gardner and Agatha Christie. The protagonist of Kanta series thriller, Barrister P.K. Basu was based on the character Perry Mason.

Apart from this series, he wrote Bishupal Bodh: Uposonghar [বিশুপাল বধ: উপসংহার], which is a completion of Sharadindu Bandyopadhyay's unfinished Byomkesh Bakshi story: Bishupal Bodh. Narayan Babu fulfilled some terms given by Bandyopadhyay's friend Pratul Chandra Gupta, who edited Bandyopadhyay's works. Samaresh Basu, as the editor (also a friend of Sanyal) of Mahanagar, a magazine, published it in a Puja issue.

Sanyal did not simply copy foreign works; he took the central themes and adapted them for a Bengali atmosphere, which would be familiar to Bengali readers. For this reason, some changes in the original plot and a few anachronisms (that suit, e.g. offering a chair to the accused & the witness at the courtroom in India—- which is not generally the practice) necessarily occur in his writings. He always mentioned the source, the changes he made in his script, and why these were necessary. He also tried to keep the nomenclature resembling the original so as to offer his gratitude. He often referred to P. K. Basu as "the Perry Mason of the East", as it was Erle Stanley Gardner's masterpiece that inspired him to create Basu.

Narayan Babu was generally considered one of the most influential authors in Bengali and is recognized for attempting to break away from the artificial sentimentality and publisher reliance that previously limited and defined his predecessors and the genre as a whole.

== Accolades ==
Sanyal received several awards for literature including Rabindra Puraskar (for Aporupa Ajanta in 1969), Bankim Puraskar (for Rupmanjari in 2000), and Narasingha Dutta Award. Many of his books were filmed and he won the Best Film Story Writer Award (for Satyakaam) by Bengal Film Journalists.

== List of works ==
=== Adaptations in movies ===
  1. Satyakam, his novel, was adapted into Hindi film, Satyakam (1969), directed by Hrishikesh Mukherjee, starring Dharmendra, Sharmila Tagore as Ranjana,Sanjeev Kumar Rabi Ghosh and Ashok Kumar.
  2. His another novel, Nagchampa was turned into Jadi Jantem, a Bengali Film released on 1 March 1974. This film was directed by Yatrik and starred by Uttam Kumar as P. K. Basu, Ruma Guha Thakurta as Ranu, Soumitra Chatterjee as Koushik Mitra, Supriya Choudhury as Sujata, Basanta Choudhury, Kamal Mitra and Haradhan Banerjee. Sanyal also wrote the dialogue.
  3. The plot of Ashleelotar Daye was adopted to a Chiranjit starred film with the same name (1983).
  4. Neelimay Neel was turned into a Tapas Paul, Indrani Haldar & Anup Kumar starred film in 1991.
  5. Pashanda Pandit was filmed by director Shibaprasad Sen. Soumitra Chatterjee starred film in 1993.
  6. Gajamukta was released in 1994 by director Ajit Lahiri.
  7. Kaantaye Kaantaye scheduled to release on ZEE5 on August 15, 2024. Directed by Joydip Mukherjee This is based on the book Sonar Kanta, from the Kanta series. Features Saswata Chatterjee as P.K.Basu

=== Children and teenage literature ===
- Sherlock Hebo [শার্লক হেবো] (1971)
- Origami (1982; with Pradip Dutta)
- Disneyland [ডিসনেল্যান্ড] (1985)—A delightful account on his trip to Disneyland, California. The book contains some of his pencil sketches.
- Nak Unchu [নাক উঁচু] (1985)
- Hati Aar Hati [হাতি আর হাতি] (1989)

=== Scientific articles and science fictions ===
- Biswasghatak [বিশ্বাসঘাতক] (1974)—This is a book about the story of the Manhattan Project in the US during the 1930s and has provides insight on the type of collective intellect that worked together to make the project a success. This book also displays themes of conflict between economics, politics, "common sense", and their interplay.
- He Hansabalaka [হে হংসবলাকা] (1974)
- Obak Prithibee [অবাক পৃথিবী] (1976)
- Nakshatraloker Debotatma [নক্ষত্রলোকের দেবতাত্মা] (1976)
- Aji Hote Shatobarsho Pore [আজি হতে শতবর্ষ পরে] (1985)
- Charles Augustus Lindebark
- Bihanga Basona (1998)

=== Painting, sculpture, architecture ===
- Ajanta Aparupa [অজন্তা অপরূপা] (1968)
- La-jawab Dehli Aparupa Agra [লা-জবাব দেহ্লি অপরূপা আগ্রা] (1982)
- Immortal Ajanta (1984)
- Erotics in Indian Temples (1984)
- Bharatiyo Bhaskarje Mithun [ভারতীয় ভাস্কর্যে মিথুন] (1980)
- Prabanchak [প্রবঞ্চক] (1987)—This contains two articles, one on the original story of stealing the Mona Lisa & the other one is on the greatest forgery in the history of paintings.

=== Travel ===
- DandokShabori [দণ্ডকশবরী] (1962)
- Pother Mohaprosthan [পথের মহাপ্রস্থান] (1965)
- Japan Theke Fire [জাপান থেকে ফিরে] (1971)—This is an account of a trip to Japan during Exposition, 1970.

=== Nostalgic ===
- Shat Ekshotti [ষাট একষট্টি] (1984)
- Abar Se Esechhe Firiya [আবার সে এসেছে ফিরিয়া] (1989)

=== Psychological ===
- Monami [মনামী] (1960)
- Antarleena [অন্তর্লীনা] (1966)
- Tajer Swapno [তাজের স্বপ্ন] (1969)

=== Detective ===
All books of the Kanta series are of Prasanna Kumar Basu (famously known as P. K. Basu), Bar at Law.

- 1.Nagchampa [নাগচম্পা] (Published: 1968)

This novel is the first P. K. Basu story by Sanyal, though he called it as a "trial ball". It was later adopted in a Bengali movie, Jadi Jantem in 1974. Here, Basu is shown to be an old, unmarried man who solves the death mystery of a businessman. Sujata, who is an essential character of the following stories, was accused of murder. Koushik, in a disguise of a driver, also helps her. Koushik is a typical example of bulk of the engineers who fails to manage any satisfiable job.

- 2.Sonar Kanta [সোনার কাঁটা] (Written:1974 Published:October 1974; Inspiration: mousetrap by Agatha Christie; Dedication: Late Byomkesh Bakshi)

After Jodi Jantem, he changed the character Basu to be an aged lawyer, whose wife Ranu is made invalid & Suborna alias Mithu, their only daughter is died in an accident. This novel marks the proper start of the series. This is based on a murder of Ramen Guha, a policeman, and some other incidents at The Repose, a hotel at Ghum, Darjeeling, run by the Mitra couple, Sujata & Koushik Mitra.

- 3.Machher Kanta [মাছের কাঁটা] (Written:1974, Published:March 1975; Dedication: Samarjit Gupta)

Mitra couple returns Kolkata, after selling the hotel and starts a private detective agency, named Sukoushali [সুকৌশলী] at Basu's residence at New Alipore. This story revolves about Supriya Dashgupta [সুপ্রিয় দাশগুপ্ত], a manager of a Bombay based farm. At the end of the story, the caught person is proved to be different than the original culprit.

- 4.Pother Kanta [পথের কাঁটা] (Written:1975, Published:January 1976; Dedication: Mukul Chakraborty)

Old Jagadananda Sen lives with granddaughter Nilima Sen, nephew Jogananda and Jogananda's relative Shyamal. Mahendra, his ex-employee, whom he revoked, suddenly comes back and starts blackmailing Jagadananda. He, then seeks help from Basu. Meanwhile, police arrests Jagadananda in charge of killing his own nephew Jogananda. Joydeep, Nilima's fiancé shadows another ex-employee of Jagadananda, Yu Siang, a Burmese, who is also supposed to come India to blackmail the old man. Finally, Basu succeeds to make him free catching the culprit.

- 5.Ghorir Kanta [ঘড়ির কাঁটা] (Written:1976, Published:January 1977; Dedication: Suresh Prasad Lahiri Chaudhuri)

Rabi Bosu, a police inspector, who is prevalent in some later stories, is introduced. This story is about a ticket of lottery and a murder. Basu makes Prakash Sengupta, a doctor free from all charges of killing his friend, Kamalesh Mitter.

- 6.Kuler Kanta [কুলের কাঁটা] (Written:1977, Published:May 1978; Dedication: Kamal Hossain)

Minati Roychaudhury, alias Minti, a lost granddaughter of GokulChandra Roychaudhury is found back. This story has a very little to do with Basu.

- 7.Uler Kanta [উঁলের কাঁটা] (Written: 1978, Published:May 1980; Inspiration: The Case of the Perjured Parrot by Erle Stanley Gardner; Dedication: Sheela & Gourdas BosuMallik)

Mahadeo Prasad Khanna, an ex-M. P. was murdered in a lonely cottage in Kashmir. A parrot is taught in such a way that Rama Khanna, a Bengali lady, supposed to be married by Khanna is kept in the lock-up. Basu finally solves the issue by tracing some clues at the cottage, that includes a pair of wool knitting sticks (in Bengali, which are called Uler Kanta).

- 8.Aw-Aa-Kaw Khuner Kanta [অ-আ-ক-খুনের কাঁটা] (Written: 1986, Published: Kolkata Book Fair, 1987; Inspiration: The A.B.C. Murders by Agatha Christie; Dedication: Prafulla Roy)

ChandraaChoor Chatterjee [চন্দ্রচূড় চ্যাটার্জী] of Chandannagar was murdered by his brother in law Bikash Mukherjee. Bikash makes an excellent plan to put the blame on a retired Mathematics teacher Shibajee Protap Chakraborty. Chakraborty struggles with psychological problems and has records of attempted murder unconsciously. Bikash takes full advantage of this, by sending some letters to Basu. These letters, presented to be childish or lunatic, contain quotations and pictures from Sukumar Ray's writings for children and san amalgamation of Sanskrit and English, but the mood shifts when murders are made in Asansol and Burdwan (these two names are mentioned in the letters).

- 9.Sarmeyo Genduker Kanta [সারমেয় গেণ্ডুকের কাঁটা] (Written: April 1988, Published: Kolkata Book Fair, 1989; Inspiration: Dumb Witness by Agatha Christie; Dedication: Late Probodh Chandra Basu)

Miss Pamela Johnson of Merinagar, a hypothetical township near Kanchrapara, West Bengal dies at age 72. She donates all her belongings to her servants and non-profitable organisations, totally unexpectedly, as everyone anticipates that the old lady would give it to her relatives: Suresh Haldar, Smrituku Haldar alias Tuku & Hena Thakur. This novel is unique in a way as it is written in a first person speech of Koushik Mitra.

- 10.Koutuholi Koner Kanta [কৌতূহলী কনের কাঁটা] (Published: 1993 from Ujjwal Sahitya Mandir; Dedication: Aloka & Ananta Prasad Tribedi) (ISBN 8173340072)

A distressed lady, Chhanda, is presently married to Tridib Narayan Rao, son of Tribikram Narayan Rao who is an aristocrat Rajput and also a business tycoon. She is accused of a murder of her previous husband Kamalendu Biswas alias Kamalskha Kar alias Kamal Chandra Ghosh, who also had previous marriages. Basu saves the poor lady.

- Abhi Purbak Nee Dhatu Aw-er Kanta [অভি পূর্বক নী ধাতু অ-য়ের কাঁটা] (Inspiration: The Case of the Restless Redhead by Erle Stanley Gardner).
- 12. Jadu Eto Boro Ronger Kanta [যাদু এতো বড় রঙ্গের কাঁটা]
- Ristedarer Kanta [রিস্তেদারের কাঁটা] (Published: 1992; Inspiration: The Case of the Beautiful Beggar by Erle Stanley Gardner).
- Dress Rehearsaler Kanta [ড্রেস রিহার্সালের কাঁটা] (Inspiration: Three Act Tragedy by Agatha Christie).
- 15. NyayNishtha Nyasnasheer Kanta [ন্যায়নিষ্ঠ ন্যাসনাশীর কাঁটা] (Published: 1994).

The story begins with Anirban Dutta, an investment counselor, visiting PK Basu for a legal advice. He was charged with criminal case of embezzling 2.5L from Korobi Sen, daughter of late business tycoon, Raghubir Sen. Before his demise, Mr. Raghubir Sen made a strange will, where he donated everything to a trust, except the Feat car. He made Anirban the trustee, as he thought Korobi was not mature for her age. He had the power of trading the company's shares. Korobi will have access to the fund when she reaches 22, till then she has to depend on him for her expenditures. When she was 18, she lodged a suit to challenge the will, but failed miserably. He stated that Korobi's friends are influencing her to make wrong decisions. Anirban asks PK Basu to advice on how to proceed without harming anyone.

- Sokol Kanta Dhyonyo Kore [সকল কাঁটা ধন্য করে]
- Kantay Kantay (in 6 volumes) [কাঁটায় কাঁটায়] -A collection of all Kanta books, published by Dey's Publishing.
  - Kantay Kantay 1 (Published: 1990): Sonar Kanta, Machher Kanta, Pother Kanta, Ghorir Kanta, Kuler Kanta.
  - Kantay Kantay 2 (Published: 1990): Uler Kanta, Aw-Aaw-Kaw Khuner Kanta, Sarmeyo Genduker Kanta.
  - Kantay Kantay 3: Koutuholi Koner Kata, Jady E To Boro Ronger Kata, Ristedarer Kata
  - Kantay Kantay 4: Abhi-nee-aw Er Kata, Nyaynishtha Nyasnasheer Kanta, Dwiboibahik Kanta, Jom Duare Kata

=== Research related ===
- Netaji Rahasyo Sandhane [নেতাজি রহস্য সন্ধানে] (1970)
- Chin-Bharat Long March [চিন-ভারত লং মার্চ] (1977)
- Poyomukhm [পয়োমুখম] (1987)

=== Refugee problems ===
- Bolmeek [বল্মীক] (1955)
- Bakultala P.L. Camp [বকুলতলা পি. এল. ক্যাম্প] (1955)
- AronyoDondok [অরণ্যদণ্ডক] (1961)

=== Historical ===
- Mohakaler Mondir [মহাকালের মন্দির] (1964)
- Hanseshwaree [হংসেশ্বরী] (1977)
- AnandaSwarupini [আনন্দস্বরূপিণী] (1978)
- Ladley Begum [লাডলী বেগম] (1986)
- RupManjari [রূপমঞ্জরী]
- Mrityorma Amritam [মৃত্যোর্মা অমৃতম্]

=== Biographical ===
- Ami Netajike Dekhechhi [আমি নেতাজিকে দেখেছি] (1970)
- Ami Rasbeharike Dekhechhi [আমি রাসবিহারীকে দেখেছি] (1973)
- Lindeberg [লিন্ডবার্গ] (1978)

=== Devdasi related ===
- Sutonuka Ekti Devdasir Nam [সুতনুকা একটি দেবদাসীর নাম] (1983)
- Sutonuka Kono Devdasir Nam Noy [সুতনুকা কোন দেবদাসীর নাম নয়] (1984)

=== Dramas ===
- Muskil Aasan [মুস্কিল আসান] (1954)
- Ek Dui Tin [এক দুই তিন] —An adoption in Bengali of the play by George Orwell-Animal Farm.

=== Essay collections ===
- Swargiyo Naraker Dwar Ebong... [স্বর্গীয় নরকের দ্বার এবং...] (1992)
- Leonardor Noteboi Ebong... [লেঅনার্দোর নোটবই এবং...] (1992)

=== Na Manush (Not Human) related ===
- Gajomukta [গজমুক্তা] (1973)
- Timi Timingil [তিমি তিমিঙ্গিল] (1979)
- Raskel [রাস্কেল] (1984)
- Na-Manushi Bishwokosh (Ek) [না-মানুষী বিশ্বকোষ এক] (1988)
- Na-Manushi Bishwokosh (Dui) [না-মানুষী বিশ্বকোষ দুই] (1990)
- Na-Manusher Kahini [না-মানুষের কাহিনী] (1988)

=== Social novels ===
- Bryatya [ব্রাত্য] (1959)
- Alokananda [অলকানন্দা] (1963)
- Neelimay Neel [নীলিমায় নীল] (1964)
- Satyakam [সত্যাকাম] (1965)
- Pashanda Pandit [পাষণ্ড পণ্ডিত] (1970)
- Asleelotar Daye [অশ্লীলতার দায়ে] (1975; Inspiration: Seven Minutes by Irving Wallace).
- Lal Trikon [লাল ত্রিকোণ] (1975)
- Parabola Sir [প্যারাবোলা স্যার] (1977)
- Aabar Jodi Ichcha Karo [আবার যদি ইচ্ছা কর]
- Milanantak [মিলনান্তক] (1985)
- Chonbal [ছোঁবল] (1989)
- Chhoytaner Chaoyal [ছয়তানের ছাওয়াল] (1989)
- Emonta To Hoyei Thake [এমনটা তো হয়েই থাকে] (1992)
- Amrapali [আম্রপালি] (1992)
- Maan Mane Kachu [মান মানে কচু] (1992)
