= Katha Ankahee =

Indian television series

- Genre: Drama
- Based on: Binbir Gece
- Directed by: Ravi Bhushan, Inder Das
- Starring: Aditi Sharma; Azinkya Mishra; Adnan Khan
- Country of origin: India
- Original language: Hindi
- No. of seasons: 1
- No. of episodes: 260

Production
- Producer: Sunjoy Waddhwa
- Camera setup: Multi-camera
- Running time: 20–21 minutes
- Production company: Sphere Origins

Original release
- Network: Sony TV
- Release: 5 December 2022 – 1 December 2023

Katha Ankahee (transl. A story untold) is an Indian television drama series that premiered from 5 December 2022 to 1 December 2023 on Sony TV. It streams digitally on SonyLIV. Produced by Sunjoy Waddhwa under the banner of Sphere Origins, it is the official Hindi adaptation of Turkish series One Thousand and One Nights, which was inspired from Arabian Nights. It starred Aditi Sharma and Adnan Khan.

== Plot ==
Katha Singh, a single mother with unwavering determination, faced the most challenging battle of her life as she fought for her son Aarav, who was diagnosed with a severe case of blood cancer. Struggling to meet the overwhelming medical expenses and receiving no support from her in-laws, Katha found herself at crossroad.

Meanwhile, Viaan Raghuvanshi, a successful architect, carries the scars of his past. His father's abandonment of his mother, Teji, for another woman had left Viaan with deep emotional trauma. He had developed a cynical view of women, perceiving them as gold diggers as a result of his mother's attempt to paint his father as a gullible and a cheating husband.

Katha works at Viaan and his best friend Ehsan's company Earthcon Private Limited. Apart from a few small slip-ups and initial misunderstandings, Katha manages to impress everyone with her talent and resourcefulness. Ehsan starts getting attracted to her and tries to impress her but get no response from Katha's end apart from friendship. Driven by her son's desperate need for treatment, Katha turns to her boss, Viaan, seeking financial assistance. However, she never mentions the reason for which she needs money, as she had posed as a single unmarried woman in her job application due to an old, unfair company policy that no one had paid attention to. This ask for a large amount of money leads to Viaan considering her as another potential gold digger. Viaan perceived Katha as a woman with integrity. So, instead of a simple offer of help, Viaan proposed an unthinkable condition to test her - that Katha spend a night with him in return for the money. It was a heart-wrenching decision for Katha, but her love for Aarav pushed her to reluctantly accept, knowing that his life hung in balance.

With Aarav's treatment successful and his health gradually improving, Katha's joy was overshadowed by a deep resentment towards Viaan. She couldn't shake the bitterness she felt, while Viaan convinced she's a gold-digger continued to treat her rudely at work driving her to eventually resign. Yet, as fate would have it, circumstances began to unfold, revealing the complexities of their intertwined lives. Katha's estranged father-in-law, Kailash Garewal, starts to recognise his past mistakes and sought reconciliation with Katha. This unexpected development ignites resentment in Reet, Kailash's other daughter-in-law, who disapproves of the renewed bond. Meanwhile, Viaan's mother Teji and Ehsan's mother Farah, meet Katha at a party thrown by the Garewals and discover the story of her son's cancer treatment. When they inform this to their sons, the two are shaken in disbelief while Viaan's wrenched in guilt to his core at his own misdeed.

Viaan begs Katha to join Earthcon Private Limited again with a promise to never get in her way again. He starts changing unfair company policies against married employees. Katha rejoins to save the Dubai heritage project as it affects jobs of several other employees. Viaan begins to fall for Katha yet keeps his distance. Unbeknownst to Katha and Viaan, their paths continue to intertwine. Aarav and Viaan, unaware of their true identities, form an unlikely friendship at the sports club they both visit. As the days go by, emotions grow stronger and Katha starts seeing a different side of Viaan, caring, kind and principled. She can't deny the connection they share, even though bitterness lingers in her heart.

Simultaneously, Reet, driven by jealousy and malice, poisons Teji, against Katha. The seeds of doubt and mistrust threaten to tear apart the fragile bonds forming between Katha, Viaan, and their respective families. However, the bond between Katha and Viaan gets stronger, driven by their mutual respect for each other.

Amidst the turmoil, a surprising revelation emerges. Vanya, a new recruit joined EarthCon Private Limited and soon is discovered as the daughter of Viaan's father Viraj and Seema Datta, the woman for whom Viraj, had left Teji and Viaan years ago. It is revealed that Viraj had never wanted to abandon Viaan and had tried to convince Teji for an amicable divorce for a very long time, promising to always support her and Viaan completely, even naming the company and property in her name. He could never find love in their arranged marriage, but upon Teji's adamancy to not be a divorcee and lose her status in society, fuelled further by Farah, he finally gave up and left home. This shocking truth shakes Viaan to his core, forcing him to confront the complexities of his past and the pain his family had endured.

Realizing the truth behind Vanya's identity, Viaan embraces her as his long-lost sister, accepting her into his life with open arms. In doing so, Viaan not only reconciles with the past but also deepens his bond with Katha. Witnessing Viaan's transformation and his unconditional acceptance of Vanya and her mother, Katha finds herself drawn to him even more. Eventually, Katha and Viaan confess their love to each other, much to Teji's chagrin. Meanwhile, Aarav is overjoyed to know about Robin being Viaan and graciously accepts him in Katha's life.

Mr. Garewal isn't pleased initially, feeling Viaan to be not good enough, but eventually comes around seeing Viaan's genuine love and affection for both Katha and Aarav. Teji is beyond furious at this entire development but controls herself in front of Viaan at the behest of her sister, Viaan's maasi, Maya. Maya advises Teji to agree to the relationship prima facie and wait for her to turn up and make the right moves to separate Viaan and Katha.

Maya successfully unearths Katha and Viaan's darkest secret, much to the chagrin of everyone. Yuvraj, after knowing the truth through Reet turns violent against Viaan who ends up being on deathbed. Seeing his condition, Teji soon realises her mistake and ousts Maya. Maya, in desperation, blackmails Katha, who in fear of facing Aarav, leaves Viaan. Meanwhile, Kailash comes up knowing about Viaan's misdeeds and is severely affected. A brawl ensures in which Viaan accidentally shoots Kailash and Katha, witnessing this, ends her relationship with Viaan, who is sent to prison on an attempt to murder Kailash.

=== 8 months later ===
Katha has moved on in her life and has left EarthCon Private Limited. She lives with Aarav who has now developed anger issues and is undergoing therapy for the same. She works for an event management firm. Viaan, after spending eight months in prison, returns home as proven innocent. Ehsan has got engaged to Vanya while Katha has got engaged to Dr. Raghav Sehgal, Aarav's therapist.

After coming out of prison, it is shown that Viaan has written a book full of Shayaris named Katha Ankahee as a token of his love to Katha and is famous. Dr. Raghav and Viaan unknowingly become good friends and simultaneously Viaan tries to find Katha and reconcile. Katha is aware of Viaan's search and tries to avoid him as she is afraid of bad consequences that might happen to Aarav after his and Viaan's face off. She believes that their love did not stay strong to overshadow their awful past and it is their destiny to fall apart. But eventually, Katha and Viaan meet at a singles party, as Katha was a part of event organiser and Viaan had accompanied a friend. Later Viaan gets to know that Katha is Dr. Raghav's fiancee.

Viaan firmly believes that Katha does not love Dr. Raghav and it is a compromised alliance from her side. Viaan stays positive and much hopeful that one day, Katha and Aarav would come back to his life. Dr. Raghav visits Viaan at his office and is mesmerised to see a model of 'Monument of Love' that was made by Viaan to Katha long back when they were together. Looking at that Raghav is thrilled to build a similar monument and offer it to Katha and wants her expertise on the project too, unknowing the truth. Katha reluctantly agrees and acts cold towards Viaan to give him an impression that she loves Raghav. But Viaan reminds her of their promises and their best times. He requests her to trust him and he would convince Aarav with honesty to calm his anger and make everything alright. But Katha is too afraid of giving Viaan a chance and thinks it would be a final nail in the coffin to ruin everything completely.

Meanwhile Vanya and Ehsan debate because Vanya is hopeful as Viaan but Ehsan is logical as Katha. Viaan uses an opportunity to face Aarav at Raghav's house and Aarav gets anger attack. Confused at Aarav's sudden intense anger and unreasonable behaviour, Raghav asks Katha to tell truth. Katha in ruins, at the heated moment asks Viaan to move on and be away from her and Aarav's life. Devastated, Viaan decides to leave to Paris with his mother permanently. Still being in love with Katha and Aarav, he sends a letter to Aarav citing his apology. Vanya informs Katha about Viaan's decision and Katha is shattered. Katha loves Viaan and wants to be with him but in denial as she is unable to gain courage to fight for their love.

After revelation of truth, Raghav suggests to Katha that they should get married. Katha is left without any choice agree as Raghav's daughter treats her as a mother and moving away would hurt her. But Raghav reminds Katha that true love is always unconditional, it never gives up at challenging times and overcomes all obstacles. On the wedding day, Viaan is all set to move to Paris. But Katha hastily meets Viaan and admits that she still loves Viaan very dearly. She asks Raghav for forgiveness as she never loved him, and their marriage would be a sham. Katha confesses her love to Viaan is eternal, Aarav acknowledges his love to Viaan as his father, and they reconcile. Katha is revealed to be pregnant with Viaan's child.

== Cast ==
=== Main ===
- Aditi Sharma as Katha Singh Raghuvanshi – Architect at EarthCon Private Limited; Part-time yoga instructor; Aditya's widow; Viaan's wife; Aarav's mother. (2022–2023)
- Adnan Khan as Viaan Raghuvanshi – CEO of EarthCon Private Limited; a writer and poet; Teji and Viraj's son; Vanya's half-brother; Ahsan's best friend and brother-figure; Katha's second husband; Aarav's step-father. (2022–2023)

=== Recurring ===
- Azinkya Mishra as Aarav Garewal – Katha and Aditya's son; Viaan's step-son (2022–2023)
- Manish Raisinghan as Dr. Raghav Sehgal – Pari's son; Ruhi's father; Katha's ex-fiancé; Aarav's therapist (2023)
- Samar Vermani as Ehsan Contractor – President of EarthCon Limited; Salim and Farah's son; Viaan and Katha's best friend; Vanya's husband (2022–2023)
- Manika Mehrotra as Vanya Datta Contractor – Viraj and Seema's daughter; Teji's step-daughter; Viaan's half-sister; Ehsan's wife (2023)
- Reeta Prajapati as Falguni – Katha's neighbour (2022–2023)
- Bidisha Ghosh Sharma as Teji Raghuvanshi – Maya's sister; Viraj's widow; Farah's friend; Viaan's mother; Vanya's step-mother; Aarav's step-grandmother (2022–2023)
- Himanshu Manek as Jitesh "Jeetu Bhai" Patel – EarthCon Private Limited's oldest employee; Meenu's husband
- Preeti Amin as Neerja aka Dodo – Aarav's donor (2022–2023)
- Priyamvada Singh as Farah Contractor – Salim's widow; Teji's friend; Ehsan's mother (2022–2023)
- Vinay Rohrra as Aditya "Adi" Garewal – Kavita and Kailash's elder son; Yuvraj's brother; Katha's first husband; Aarav's father (2022–2023) (Dead; flashback)
- Gireesh Sahdev as Kailash Garewal – Kavita's husband; Aditya and Yuvraj's father; Kiara, Aarna, Aarav and Yohaan's grandfather (2022–2023) (Dead)
- Jyoti Gauba as Kavita Garewal – Kailash's widow; Aditya and Yuvraj's mother; Kiara, Aarna, Aarav and Yohaan's grandmother (2022–2023)
- Jasveenn Kaur as Reet Garewal – Yuvraj's wife; Kiara, Aarna and Yohaan's mother (2022–2023)
- Vishal Malhotra as Yuvraj Garewal – Kavita and Kailash's younger son; Aditya's brother; Reet's husband; Kiara, Aarna and Yohaan's father (2022–2023)
- Sarah Killedar as Ruhi Sehgal – Raghav's daughter (2023)
- Unknown as Vicky – Pari's brother; Raghav's uncle (2023)
- Raynu Verma as Pari Sehgal – Vicky's sister; Raghav's mother; Ruhi's grandmother (2023)
- Viplove Sharma as Pranav – Katha's employee at the café (2023)
- Pallavi Singh as Liza – Viaan and Ehsan's college friend and employee (2022–2023)
- Supriya Tatkar as Jenny – Viaan's secretary (2022–2023)
- Roma Arora as Nivedita – Viaan's employee (2022–2023)
- Anjali Mukhi as Maya Singhania – Teji's sister; Viaan's aunt (2023)
- Sheen Dass as Rewa – Katha's friend; Viaan's employee (2022–2023)
- Kavya Rana as Kiara Garewal – Yuvraj and Reet's elder daughter; Aarna and Yohaan's sister; Aarav's cousin (2022–2023)
- Aaradhya Rana as Aarna Garewal – Yuvraj and Reet's younger daughter; Kiara and Yohaan's sister; Aarav's cousin (2022–2023)
- Vinod Johari as Viraj Raghuvanshi – Teji's husband; Viaan and Vanya's father; Seema's lover (2022–2023) (Dead; flashback)
- Priti Narnaware as Amrita Mehra – Viaan's former employee who now runs her firm (2022)
- Muskaan Mehta as Shamita Jaiswal – Viaan's employee (2022)
- Manoj Chandila as Anirudh Verma – Managing Director of Pyramid Global Architecture Limited (2022)
- Vishal Gandhi as Dr. Amit Rawal – Hematologist; Aarav's doctor (2022–2023)
- Astha Agarwal as Meera – Viaan's employee; Katha's colleague; Yuvraj's lover (2023)
- Prachi Kowli as Seema Datta – Vanya's mother; Viraj's mistress (2023) (Dead)
- Arjun Khurana as Keith – Viaan's college friend; a musician and Amrita's husband (2023)
- Sushmita Sahela as Amrita – Viaan's college friend and Keith's wife (2023)
- Ahmad Harhash as Dr. Salian Singhmar – he is the doctor of Yuvraj's and he also owns the clinic (2022–2023)

== Production ==
=== Casting ===
Initially, Mohit Malik was in talks to play the male lead "Viaan", but couldn't join due to his prior commitments. Gashmeer Mahajani was also approached to play the male lead, but he refused. He later revealed that he regretted rejecting the role.

Aditi Sharma as Katha, and Adnan Khan as Viaan were signed as the lead. Samar Virmani and Sheen Dass was cast as the other leads. In November 2022, it was confirmed Vishal Gandhi had a cameo appearance in the show.

=== Development ===
The series was announced by Sphere Origins for Sony Entertainment Television in October 2022. It is the remake of Kanal D's popular Turkish soap opera Binbir Gece.

The series marks the comebacks of Adnan Khan and Aditi Sharma into fiction after the COVID-19 pandemic and their first collaboration.

=== Filming ===
The series is set in Mumbai. Shooting began in November 2022 and mainly shot at the Film City, Mumbai.

=== Release ===
The teaser of the series was released on 14 October 2022. It replaced Yashomati Maiyaa Ke Nandlala from 5 December 2022.

However, on 30 October 2023, after Punyashlok Ahilyabai ended, the series' timeslot was changed with Dabangii taking over the series' previous timeslot.

== Reception ==
Times Of India commented on Sharma and Khan for "seamlessly fit[ting] into their parts", and particularly noted the dialogue, the costuming and "[e]ven the Mumbai apartments" in which the production is filmed, but nonetheless faulted the program as "too slow with very few cheerful moments".

== Awards and nominations ==
Year	Award	Category	Recipient	Result	Ref.
2023	23rd Indian Television Academy Awards	Best Show (Drama)	Katha Ankahee	Won	
2023	23rd Indian Television Academy Awards	Best Director	Ravi Bhushan	Won	
2023	23rd Indian Television Academy Awards	Best Actress – Drama (Jury)	Aditi Sharma	Won	
2023	23rd Indian Television Academy Awards	Best Child Artist	Azinkya Mishra	Won	
2023	23rd Indian Television Academy Awards	Best Actor – Drama (Jury)	Adnan Khan	Nominated	
2023	23rd Indian Television Academy Awards	Best Actor – Drama (Popular)	Adnan Khan	Nominated	
2023	23rd Indian Television Academy Awards	Best Actress – Drama (Popular)	Aditi Sharma	Nominated	
2023	23rd Indian Television Academy Awards	Best Supporting Actor	Samar Vermani	Nominated	

== See also ==
- List of programs broadcast by Sony Entertainment Television
