= Tose Naina Milaai Ke =

Indian drama television series

- Genre: Drama; Romance
- Screenplay by: Dialogues; Arundhati Sharma; Priyom Jha
- Story by: Vera Raina; Sonakshi Khandelwal
- Directed by: Abhay Chawda
- Starring: Vishal Gandhi; Supriya Kumari; Simran Singh; Karan Khandelwal
- Theme music composer: Nishant Pandey
- Opening theme: Tose Naina Milaai Ke
- Country of origin: India
- Original language: Hindi
- No. of seasons: 2
- No. of episodes: 469

Production
- Producers: Rajesh Ram Singh; Pradeep Kumar; Piya Bajpeyi; Shaika Parvin
- Cinematography: Rishi Raj Sharma
- Editors: Ashish Singh; Anuj Singh
- Camera setup: Multi-camera
- Running time: 22-24 minutes
- Production companies: Cockcrow & Shaika Entertainment

Original release
- Network: Dangal
- Release: 11 September 2023 – 16 May 2026

Tose Naina Milaai Ke (transl. As My Eye Caught Yours) is an Indian Hindi-language television drama series that aired from 11 September 2023 to 10 November 2024 on Dangal TV. Digitally available on Dangal Play and produced by Cockcrow & Shaika Entertainment. It stars Supriya Kumari and Vishal Gandhi in their lead roles. Second season aired on 16 March 2026 to 16 May 2026, and stars Simran Singh and Karan Khandelwal.

== Series overview ==
Season	No. of episodes	Originally broadcast (India)	
Season	No. of episodes	Series premiere	Series finale
1	415	11 September 2023	10 November 2024
2	54	16 March 2026	16 May 2026

== Plot ==
Kuhu is a simple girl from a village Munyatolla. Kuhu is dark-skinned whilst Hansini is pale. The woman who gave the curse her granddaughter is saved by Kuhu on the wedding day that whichever family she marries into nothing can harm them not knowing its Dev Chandel's family so when Kuhu is in the house nothing happens to the girls.

Sanjiv wants Rajeev and Kuhu to have the family's first child so he tries to stay away from Hansini whilst Hansini plots with his father in order to get pregnant first but nothing happens. Whilst on the other hand Rajeev who is blind at first doesn't accept Kuhu but soon gradually falls in love with her due to her loving nature. Together they overcome many hurdles and try to get his father to accept Kuhu as his bahu, but he does not want to because of dark skin. After many hurdles and just when everything seems fine Rajeev gets a sharp pain in the head and is hospitalized then it is known that Rajeev can get his eyes back but needs a donor. The only available donor are the eyes of a woman whose case Rajeev's father as a judge gave a wrong verdict which is why her mother had cursed the family that whichever girl married into the family will die. Kuhu persuades the woman's mother but fails so she decides she to kill herself to give her eyes to Rajeev's just as she is about to do that the woman's daughter arrives and agrees to give her eyes if Dev Chandel gives a correct verdict on her case this time. So Rajeev recovers his vision, but when he sees Hansini he thinks she is Kuhu and is smitten by her beauty. Just then Kuhu enters and he learns that she is Kuhu and is shocked and says he never thought she would be dark-skinned and can't accept her. Hansini gets happy and falls in love with Rajeev and starts her drama to get a divorce from Sanjeev and marry Rajeev. She schemes and locks the family in jail for domestic violence in return asks Sanjeev for divorce and for Rajeev to marry her. Sanjeev divorces her however Rajeev puts a fake drama to marry her. When family is released he tells her that he never married her.

== Cast ==
=== Season 1 ===
==== Main ====
- Supriya Kumari as Kuhu Chandel: Chandan and Barkha's younger daughter; Hansini and Babloo's sister; Rajeev's wife; Koyal and Kanak's mother (2023–2024)
  - as Hansini Chandel (after plastic surgery): Chandan and Barkha's elder daughter; Kuhu and Babloo's elder sister; Sanjeev and Rajeev's ex-wife; Kanak’s adoptive mother (2024)
    - Simaran Kaur as Hansini Chandel (2023–2024)
- Vishal Gandhi as Rajeev Narayan Chandel: Dev Narayan Chandel's elder son; Sanjeev’s brother; Kuhu's husband; Koyal and Kanak's father (2023–2024)

==== Season 2 ====
- Simran Singh / Supriya Kumari as Pihu Singh Choudhary: Pratibha's daughter; Ishaan's widow; Yuvraj 's wife (2026) / (2026)
- Karan Khandelwal as Ishaan Choudhary: Brijesh and Indu's son; Kalyani's step-son; Yuvraj's half-brother; Avantika's ex-boyfriend; Pihu's late husband (2026)
- Vishal Gandhi as Yuvraj Singh Choudhary: Brijesh and Kalyani's son; Indu's step-son; Ishaan's half-brother; Pihu's second husband (2026)

=== Recurring ===
==== Season 2 ====
- Dhaval Tripathi as Dhairya Choudhary: Brijesh's elder brother; Savitri's husband; Raghav's father (2026)
- Naina Gupta as Savitri Choudhary: Dhairya's wife; Raghav's mother (2026)
- Bharatt Bhatia as Raghav Choudhary: Dhairya and Savitri's son; Avantika's husband (2026)
- Deeksha Suryawanshi as Avantika Choudhary: Ishaan's ex-boyfriend; Raghav's wife; Pihu's enemy (2026)
- Akshat Karma as Rajan (2026)
- Bidisha Ghosh Sharma as Pratibha: Pihu's mother (2026)
- Shivam Verma as Bittu (2026)
- Prerna Bhat as Tara (2026)
- Avinash Sain as Guddu (2026)
- Anjali Gupta as Brijesh's mistress (2026)

==== Season 1 ====
- Sanjay Batra as Devnarayan Chandel: Prabha and Bhanupratap's brother; Siddheshwari and Khushboo's husband; Rajeev, Sanjeev and Avdesh’s father; Koyal and Kanak's grandfather (2023-2024)
- Kirron Arya as Siddheshwari Chandel: Devnarayan's first wife; Rajeev and Sanjeev's mother; Avdesh’s stepmother; Koyal and Kanak's grandmother (2023-2024)
- Anuradha Singh as Kushboo Chandel: Devnarayan's second wife; Avdesh's mother; Rajeev and Sanjeev's stepmother; Koyal and Kanak's step-grandmother (2023-2024)
- Micky Dudani as Avdesh Chandel: Devnarayan and Kushboo's son; Rajeev and Sanjeev's half-brother; Aarti's husband (2023-2024)
- Neetu Pachori as Aarti Chandel: Avdesh's wife (2024)
- Prateik Chaudhary as Sanjeev Chandel: Devnarayan and Siddheshwari's younger son; Rajeev's brother; Hansini's ex-husband; Sindhu's second husband (2023–2024)
- Nidhi Gangta as Sindhu Chandel: Sanjeev's girlfriend turned second wife (2024)
- Sanchi Kaur as Koyal Chandel: Rajeev and Kuhu's elder daughter; Kanak's sister (2024)
- Roneisha Sharma as Kanak Chandel: Rajeev and Kuhu's younger daughter; Hansini's adoptive daughter; Koyal's younger sister (2024)
- Shivendra Om Sainiyol as Bhanupratap Chandel: Devnarayan and Prabha's brother; Janvi's father (2023-2024)
- Saniya Khera as Janvi Chandel: Bhanupratap's daughter; Ravi's girlfriend (2023-2024)
- Kishan Bhan as Chandhan Das: Barkha's husband; Kuhu, Babloo and Hansini's father (2023-2024)
- Chitrapama Banerjee as Barkha Das: Chandan's wife; Kuhu, Babloo and Hansini's mother (2023-2024)
- Sagar Jashnani as Babloo Das: Chandan and Barkha's younger son; Hansini and Kuhu's brother (2023-2024)
- Vinod Goswami as Pappu (2023)
- Siraj Mustafa Khan as Rajan Verma: Jayant Verma's brother (2024)
- Yajuvendra Singh as Jayant Verma: Rajan Verma's brother; Ravi's father (2024)
- Saim Khan as Ravi Verma: Jayant Verma's son; Janvi's boyfriend (2024)
- Gagan Yadav as Bunty (2024)
- Lakshya Handa as Viraj Tyagi (2024)
- Maahi Khan as Bhoomika (2024)
- Jasmine Avasia as Rhea: Rajeev's ex-girlfriend; Kuhu's rival (2024)
- Dipali Saini as Cop (2024)
- Bhavya Prajapati as Roopa (2024)

=== Cameo appearances ===
- Chahat Pandey as Krishna Jeet Narayan from Nath – Krishna Aur Gauri Ki Kahani (2024)

== Production ==
=== Casting ===
The series was announced on Dangal TV by Shaika Entertainment. Supriya Kumari, Vishal Gandhi and Prateik Chaudhary were signed as the leads. The first promo was released in August 2023.

=== Time slot ===
Initially, the show was launched in the 9:30 PM time slot. However, after one week, it was moved to the Prime time slot of 9:00 PM. Simultaneously, Sindoor Ki Keemat 2 was shifted to the 9:30 PM time slot.
