= Ayoshi Talukdar =

Indian actress

- Born: Kolkata, West Bengal, India
- Occupations: Actress, model
- Years active: 2017–present

Ayoshi Talukdar is an Indian actress, who primarily works in Bengali cinema industry.

== Personal life ==
Indian writer of modern Bengali literature Narayan Sanyal was her grandfather.

== Career ==
Talukdar started her acting career with her first movie Oskar. Apart from Oskar she has acted in many films such as Satyanweshi Byomkesh, Thai Curry, Dadur Kirti. In 2021 she is going to make her Bollywood debut with the film Uma, which is directed by Tathagata Singha.

== Filmography ==
=== Films ===
Year	Title	Role	Language	Ref.
2018	Oskar	Koyel	Bengali	
2019	Satyanweshi Byomkesh	Heena Mullick	Bengali	
2019	Thai Curry		Bengali	
2020	Harano Prapti		Bengali	
2020	Dadur Kirti	Torsha	Bengali	
2021	Uma	Pinky	Hindi (Unreleased)	
2022	Hirokgorer Hire		Bengali	
2022	Amrapali		Bengali	
2022	Haar Mana Haar		Bengali	
2023	Archier Gallery		Bengali	

=== Television ===
Year	Title	Role	Language	Ref.
2026	108 Base Hospital – Uri	Dr. Captain Mili Banerjee	Hindi	

=== Web series ===
Year	Title	Role	Language	Ref.
2018	Eken Babu		Bengali	
2024	Kaantaye Kaantaye	Sujata Chatterjee	Bengali	
