= Uma (unreleased film) =

Unreleased Indian film

- Directed by: Tathagata Singha
- Written by: Tathagata Singha & Sudeep Nigam
- Produced by: Avishek Ghosh; Mantraraj Paliwal
- Starring: Kajal Aggarwal; Ayoshi Talukdar; Gaurav Sharma; Harsh Chhaya; Tinnu Anand
- Production companies: AVMA Media; Miraj Group
- Country: India
- Language: Hindi

Uma is an unreleased Indian Hindi-language film directed by Tathagata Singha. The film is produced by Avishek Ghosh and Mantraraj Paliwal. The film stars Kajal Aggarwal, Tinnu Anand, Harsh Chhaya, Gaurav Sharma and Ayoshi Talukdar.

== Cast ==
- Kajal Aggarwal as Uma
- Tinnu Anand
- Harsh Chhaya
- Meghana Malik
- Gaurav Sharma
- Shriswara
- Ayoshi Talukdar as Pinky
