= Chhavi Mittal =

Indian film and television actress (born 1980)

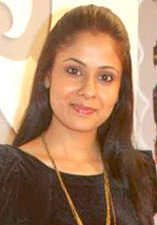
- Mittal in 2010
- Born: 4 September 1980 (age 46); Gurgaon, Haryana, India
- Occupations: Actress; writer; producer; model
- Spouse: Mohit Hussein (m. 2004)
- Children: 2
- Website: Official website

Chhavi Mittal (born 4 September 1980) is an Indian actress, writer and producer who mainly works in Hindi television.

== Career ==
Mittal started her career in the television industry in 2004. She is known for portraying the character of Disha in Tumhari Disha, Subhadra in Bandini, Himangi in Ek Chutki Aasman, Tulsi in Krishnadasi and Natasha in the film Ek Vivaah... Aisa Bhi. She has also co-founded Superb Ideas Trending (SIT), a digital production company with her husband. In 2023, she wrote a memoir on motherhood named More than a Mama, published by Rupa Publications.

== Personal life ==
Chhavi Mittal attended Springdales School, Pusa Road in Delhi. Mittal married director Mohit Hussein in 2004. She is from a Hindu background while her husband is a Muslim. Initially, her parents disapproved her marriage but later on, they agreed. The couple has a daughter named Areeza in 2012 and son Arham in 2019.

On 25 April 2022 after getting diagnosed with breast cancer, she underwent breast cancer removal surgery. After cancer, she got diagnosed with costochondritis. Since then she has emerged as a breast cancer activist after surviving the fatal disease.

== Filmography ==
=== Films ===
Year	Title	Role	Notes	Ref.
2007	Kaisay Kahein...	Tarot card reader		
2008	Ek Vivaah... Aisa Bhi	Natasha A. Shrivastava		
2009	Pal Pal Dil Ke Ssaat	Unknown		
2019	Rakshak	—N/a	Short film; writer	

=== Television ===
Year	Title	Role	Notes	Ref.
2004-2006	Tumhari Disha	Disha Bhonsle Sehgal		
2006	Viraasat	Nikki		
2006	Twinkle Beauty Parlour			
2006-2008	Ghar Ki Lakshmi Betiyann	Preeti		
2007	Teen Bahuraaniyaan	Advocate Kanika Vajpayee		
2007-2008	Naaginn	Aastha		
2008	Ssshhhh...Koi Hai	Sunaina/ Urmila/ Sanjana	Episodic roles	
2009	Bandini	Subhadra Mahiyavanshi / Anamika Desai		
2010	Ek Chutki Aasman	Himangi Agashe		
2010	Adaalat	Dr. Amrita Bakshi	Episodic role	
2016	Krishnadasi	Tulsi Chima		
2018	Laal Ishq	Vidya	Episode: "Kareeb"	

=== Web series ===
Year	Title	Role	Ref.
2015-2016	Men... The Real Victims	Shalini	
2017-2018	The Better Half	Rohini	

=== As producer ===
- Men... The Real Victims (2015-2016)
- Yours Cupidly (2019)

=== As writer ===
- Men... The Real Victims (2015-2016)
- The Better Half (2017-2018)
- Dolly Ki Shaadi (2017)
- Sinha V/S Sinha (2017)
