= Antarleena =

- Author: Narayan Sanyal
- Cover artist: Gautam Ray
- Language: Bengali
- Publication date: 1962

Antarleena is a Bengali novel by Indian writer Narayan Sanyal, published in 1962 with a cover design by Gautam Ray. This novel is placed in the background of psychiatry and psychoanalysis, hence the name. The psychoanalytic intrigue between Krishanu and Swaha, the main characters, makes this novel unique in Bengali literature.

== Plot ==
The story deals with the protagonist's strange psychological condition and his attempts to deal with it. Meanwhile, his life becomes intertwined with three women, who are drawn by his mysterious behaviour and are dealing with their own past. Finally the story turns into a thriller when the protagonist has to retire from his job at the intelligence department due to a life-threatening accident resulting in a nervous breakdown and vertigo making his prevailing condition more complex, while one of the women from his past is facing split personality and murder attempts
