= Pashanda Pandit =

Bengali film

Pashanda Pandit is a Bengali drama film directed by Shibaprasad Sen and produced by Ratna Sen based on a 1961 same name novel of Narayan Sanyal. This film was released in 1993. Soumitra Chatterjee played the role of the main protagonist of the film.

== Plot ==
Pandit is Sanskrit teacher. He is a widower with a daughter and lives in a village. While he tries to marry a lady named Shanti to take care of his girl properly he was insulted and beaten up by local goons. Scandals spread out against him locally. Students and teachers insult him regularly. Pandit leaves the job, returns to his own village and starts a school for women. But the local party leader tries to use Pandit for his political mileage. While he disagrees the leader tortures and rapes Pandit's only daughter.

== Cast ==
- Soumitra Chatterjee as Pandit
- Anusuya Majumdar
- Manoj Mitra
- Arun Bandyopadhyay
- Chitrangada Bose
- Nilima Biswas
- Trishna Chakraborty
