= Sphere Origins =

Indian television production company

Sphereorigins Multivision Pvt Ltd
- Industry: Entertainment
- Founded: 2002
- Founder: Sunjoy Waddhwa
- Headquarters: Mumbai, India
- Key people: Sunjoy Waddhwa; Comall Sunjoy W
- Products: Television Production, Web Series, Film Production
- Website: www.sphereorigins.com

Sphereorigins is an Indian independent media production company headquartered in Mumbai. Founded by Sunjoy Waddhwa, the company has produced a diverse array of projects for digital and television platforms that has resonated with audiences worldwide. Some of its notable works include – Saat Phere: Saloni Ka Safar, Balika Vadhu, Katha Ankahee, Pandya Store, Raneeti: Balakot & Beyond and Salakaar.

== Productions ==
=== Web series ===
Year	Title	Network
2020	Dark7White	Zee5
2020-2021	Your Honor	Sony Liv
2024	Raneeti: Balakot & Beyond	Disney+ Hotstar
2025	Salakaar	Disney+ Hotstar

=== Television shows ===
Year	Title	Network
2001 - 2002	Maan	DD Metro
2001– 2005	Des Mein Niklla Hoga Chand	Star Plus
2004 – 2005	Hey...Yehii To Haii Woh!	STAR One
2005	Rooh	Zee TV
2005–2009	Saat Phere – Saloni Ka Safar	Zee TV
2006–2007	Saathii Re	STAR One
2006–2007	Betiyaan Apni Yaa Paraaya Dhan	STAR One
2006–2007	Man Mein Hai Visshwas	Sony Entertainment Television
2007–2008	Tujko Hai Salaam Zindgi	Sony Entertainment Television
2007	Detective Omkar Nath	STAR One
2008–2009	Grihasti	Star Plus
2008–2009	Mohe Rang De	Colors TV
2008	Raajkumar Aaryyan	NDTV Imagine
2008	Simply Sapney	Zee Next
2008–2016	Balika Vadhu	Colors TV
2009–2010	Jyoti	NDTV Imagine
2009–2011	Tere Mere Sapne	Star Plus
2009	Shaurya Aur Suhani	Star Plus
2010	Ek Chutki Aasman	Sahara One
2010	Godh Bharaai	Sony Entertainment Television
2010–2011	Zindagi Ka Har Rang ... Gulaal	Star Plus
2010–2011	Yeh Ishq Haaye	STAR One
2012–2013	Phir Subah Hogi	Zee TV
2012–2013	Love Marriage Ya Arranged Marriage	Sony Entertainment Television
2012–2013	2612 / 2613	Life OK
2013	Crazy Stupid Ishq	Channel V India
2013–2014	Saraswatichandra	StarPlus
2014	Tum Saath Ho Jab Apne	Sony Pal
2013–2015	Iss Pyaar Ko Kya Naam Doon? Ek Baar Phir	StarPlus
2015–2017	Ek Tha Raja Ek Thi Rani	Zee TV
2015–2017	Mere Angne Mein	Star Plus
2015–2017	Gangaa	&TV
2015–2016	Piya Rangrezz	Life OK
2016	Chhoti Anandi	Colors TV; Rishtey
2017	Koi Laut Ke Aaya Hai	Star Plus
2017	Peshwa Bajirao	Sony Entertainment Television
2018–2019	Silsila Badalte Rishton Ka	Colors TV; Voot
2018–2019	Internet Wala Love	Colors TV
2021–2022	Balika Vadhu 2	Colors TV; Voot
2021–2024	Pandya Store	StarPlus
2022–2023	Katha Ankahee	Sony Entertainment Television
2025	Meri Bhavya Life	Colors TV

=== Films ===
Year	Title	Director	Language
2022	BaalBhaarti	Nitin Nandan	Marathi

=== Regional shows ===
Year	TV Series	Network
2011	Hamaar Sautan Hamaar Saheli	Mahuaa TV
2011–2012	Amar Naam Joyeeta	Sananda TV
2011–2012	Sobinoy Nibedon	Sananda TV
2012	Chirosaathi	Star Jalsha
2012–2013	Care Kori Na	Star Jalsha
2020–	Shinghalagna	Sun Bangla

=== Telefilms ===
Year	Telefilms	Channel
2005	Phir Se	Sahara One
2009	Un Hazaroon Ke Naam	Star Plus
2014	Teri Meri Love Stories: Barsaat	Star Plus
2015	Chatpat Jhatpat	Pogo TV
2015	Gol Mol Gongol	Pogo TV
