= Harsh Chhaya =

Indian actor

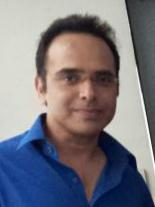
- Born: 2 December 1966 (age 59); Bhavnagar, Gujarat, India
- Education: Jamia Millia Islamia
- Occupation: Actor
- Years active: 1991–present
- Spouse(s): Shefali Shah (m. 1994; div. 2000) Suneeta Sengupta (m. 2003)

Harsh Chhaya (born 2 December 1966) is an Indian actor. He debuted in a minor role as "Jijo" in the early 1990s Zee TV series Tara, but first came into prominence in the role of Krishnakant Trivedi (KT) in mid 1990s TV series Hasratein, where he portrayed the character of a wealthy boss who exploited his married employee (Savi) into an extramarital affair with him. Harsh Chhaya has acted in various films and television series in various character and negative roles as available. He also starred with Rani Mukharji in the 2007 Bollywood film Laaga Chunari Mein Daag.

== Career ==
His first appearance was in the serial Aarohan (by Pallavi Joshi) in 1993 as Ankit Malik, and then his major breakthrough was the role of Karan in Swabhimaan, directed by Mahesh Bhatt in 1995. In 2002, Harsh acted in the serial Justajoo, directed by Ajay Sinha. Justajoo was a serial on Zee TV in 2002, which also starred Pallavi Joshi and Arpita Pandey. In 2006, he was seen as the CEO Naveen Shroff in Madhur Bhandarkar's Corporate. In 2007, he played a businessman named Kapoor in Sagar Ballary's Bheja Fry. All but two of his scenes were edited out in the final released version of this film. His performance as Vinay Khosla, a gay dress designer, was notable in Madhur Bhandarkar's 2008 critically acclaimed Fashion. Harsh Chhaya also played the role of Sanjay Gandhi in Shekhar Kapur's Pradhanmantri on ABP News.He also worked in 24:India Season 2, as an ATU Chief Siddhant Sehgal. Also, he is well known for his role as Papaji in Undekhi a SonyLIV web series.

== Personal life and education ==
Harsh was married to Shefali Shah. After a divorce from Shah, Harsh married actress Sunita Sengupta. He completed his Education at Delhi's Jamia Millia Islamia, where he pursued Mass Communication at the university's A.J.K. Mass Communication Research Centre.

== Discography ==
Year	Album	Song	Credit
2018	Khajoor Pe Atke	"Aao Na Dekha"	Lyricist
2018	Khajoor Pe Atke	"Duniya"	Lyricist
2018	Khajoor Pe Atke	"Dhokha"	Lyricist; singer

== Filmography ==
=== Films ===
Year	Title	Role	Notes
2000	Dil Pe Mat Le Yaar!!	Ali	
2002	Company	Insp. Sawant	
2002	Hathyar: Face to Face with Reality	Gauri's first husband	
2003	Dum	Siddhant	
2003	Saaya	Dr. Goenka	
2003	Janasheen	Virendra Kapoor	
2004	Stop!	Vivek Malhotra	
2005	Dhadkanein		
2005	Ramji Londonwaley	Guru	
2006	Corporate	Corporate	
2007	Aevdhese Aabhal	Dr. Shirish	Marathi film
2007	Bheja Fry	Kapoor	
2007	Red Swastik	D.C.P. Chaudhary	
2007	It's Breaking News	SP Prabhakar Gupta	
2007	Laaga Chunari Mein Daag	Rani's employer	
2008	Mithya	Mannu Sahay	
2008	My Friend Ganesha 2	Vashu's Father	
2008	Fashion	Vinay Khosla	
2009	Oh, My God!!	Shekhar	
2009	Coffee House	Vikas	
2009	Blue Oranges	Anurag Dixit	
2011	Nobel Chor	Raj	Bengali film
2012	Seal Team Six: The Raid on Osama Bin Laden	Dr Shakil Afridi	
2013	Club 60	Doctor	
2013	Jolly LLB	Albert Pinto	
2013	Super Model		
2014	A Rainy Day		Marathi film
2015	Har Har Byomkesh	Inspector Purandar Pandey	Bengali film
2016	Ghayal Once Again	Aditya Rajguru	
2017	Umeed		
2017	Shubh Aarambh		Gujarati film
2018	Byomkesh Gotro	Inspector Purandar Pandey	Bengali film
2020	Darbaan		
2020	Satyameva Jayate 2	Chief Minister Chandra Prakash Sinha	
2022	An Action Hero	Roshan - Manav's assistant	
2024	Kill	Baldeo Singh Thakur	
TBA	Uma		

=== Writer/Director ===
Year	Title	Notes
2018	Khajoor Pe Atke	

=== Television ===
Year	Title	Role	Notes
1991	Khaali Haath	Vishwas	
1993	Dillagi		
1993	Tara	Jijo	
1994	Tehkikaat	Rakesh Oberoi	
1995	Aahat	Rajat Saxena	
1995	Swabhimaan	Karan	
1995	Aarohan (The Ascent)	Lt. Rohit Sharma	
1996	Hasratein	Krishnakant Trivedi	
1996	Rishtey		4 episodes
1998	Saaya	Bhaskar Sir	
1999	Star Bestsellers	Episodic	
1999	Gubbare		
1999	Nyaay	Advocate Tarun	
1999	Chhoti Si Asha	Gurugena	
1999	Rishtey	Captain Rahul Khanna	
1999	Rishtey		
2001	Rishtey		
2002	Justujoo	Lalit Sharma	
2002	Astitva..Ek Prem Kahani	Dr Manas	
2003	Karishma- The Miracles of Destiny	Sameer	
2004	Kahaani Ghar Ghar Kii	Sandeep	
2007	Ghar ek Sapna	Dr Rishabh Choudhary	
2007	Love Story	Rohit Sehgal	
2008	Sukh By Chance	Girl's Father	
2009	Comedy Circus 3	as a Contestant	
2009	Ladies Special	Karan Singh	
2011	Hum	Doctor	
2011	Surya: The Super Cop	Surya	
2012	Hum Ne Li Hai- Shapath	ACP Jairaj	
2013	Pradhanmantri	Sanjay Gandhi	
2014	Balikha Vadhu	Palash	
2014	Ajeeb Dastaan Hai Yeh	Samarth Sachdev	
2016	Tamanna	Coach	
2016	24 (Season2)	ATU Chief	
2016	Karam Yudh		

=== Web series ===
Year	Title	Role	Platform	Notes
2019	Rangbaaz	Sundar Singh Chauhan	ZEE5 originals	Season 2
2020–present	Undekhi	Surinder Singh Atwal aka Papaji	SonyLIV	
2020	Forbidden Love	Anamika's Husband	ZEE5	
2019–present	Out of Love	Kartik Kashyap (Alia's Dad)	Hotstar	
2022	Mukhbir - The Story of a Spy	General Agha Khan	ZEE5	Season 1
2023	P I Meena	Pritam Sen	Amazon Prime Video	
2024	Gyaarah Gyaarah	Sameer Bhatiya	Zee5	Season 1
