= Jadi Jantem =

1974 Indian Bengali-language film

- Directed by: Yatrik (Tarun Majumdar)
- Written by: Narayan Sanyal
- Starring: Uttam Kumar; Soumitra Chatterjee; Supriya Devi; Tarun Kumar Chatterjee; Kamal Mitra; Basanta Choudhury
- Cinematography: Anil Gupta, Joyti Laha
- Distributed by: Chitrajug
- Release date: 1 March 1974
- Running time: 141 Minutes
- Country: India
- Language: Bengali

Jadi Jantem (English: If I Knew) is a 1974 Indian Bengali-language detective action thriller film directed by Tarun Majumdar as Yatrik. This movie was released under the banner of Chitrajug. Uttam Kumar played the main protagonist of the movie, Mr. P. K. Basu, Bar-at-law. This movie was based on the thriller novel Nagchampa of Narayan Sanyal.

== Plot ==
Koushik Mitra, an engineer took a job of taxi driver because he was unable to find an appropriate service. One day he meets Sujata, a scientist's daughter and they fall in love. Sujata is trapped in a conspiracy where she is accused of a murder. Barrister P. K. Basu defends Sujata and starts an investigation to find out the real culprit. What follows is a game full of twists and turns.

== Cast ==
- Uttam Kumar as Barrister P. K. Basu
- Soumitra Chatterjee as Koushik Mitra
- Supriya Devi as Sujata
- Kamal Mitra as Jimud Bahan
- Basanta Choudhury as Mayukhkentan Aggarwal
- Haradhan Bandopadhyay as Government Lawyer
- Ruma Guha Thakurta as Ranu Basu
- Tarun Kumar Chatterjee
- Asit Baran as Sujata's father
- Shailen Mukherjee as Nakul Hui
