= Justujoo =

- Justujoo old poster
- Also known as: Justujoo
- Genre: Indian soap opera Drama
- Directed by: Ajay Sinha
- Starring: See Below
- Country of origin: India
- Original language: Hindi
- No. of seasons: 01
- No. of episodes: 50

Production
- Producers: Sangita Sinha & Saurabh Agrawal
- Production location: Mumbai
- Running time: 24 minutes

Original release
- Network: Zee TV
- Release: 18 January 2001

Justujoo is an Indian soap opera which aired on Zee TV on Tuesday evenings in 2001. Justajoo went off air after 50 episodes. According to the producer, "with Justajoo we covered only office expenses and made no profit." Justujoo is re-telecasted on 9X channel in 2013.

== Plot ==
Justujoo is about a lawyer, Lalit Sharma (Harsh Chhaya), his wife Leela (Pallavi Joshi) and her sister Neerja (Arpita Pandey). The story revolves about how Lalit is fed up with his uneducated and old fashioned wife. He gets drawn towards his educated, career-oriented, modern sister-in-law, Neerja (Arpita Pandey). Neerja is married to Mehul (Nitesh Pandey) but their relationship does not last. Later, Neerja gets pregnant after getting into a relationship with her brother-in-law. She has a baby girl, but dies soon after that. Leela raises Neerja's daughter as her own child, along with her own two daughters. Leela and Lalit already have two daughters of their own; they grow up and get married. Leela's elder daughter does not like her stepsister. Neerja's daughter never finds the truth that Leela is not her real mother. The story ends with Leela, her husband and Neerja's daughter looking at the stars in the sky.

== Cast ==
- Harsh Chhaya as Lalit Sharma
- Pallavi Joshi as Leela Sharma
- Arpita Pandey as Neeraja
- Vaquar Shaikh as Satish
- Nitesh Pandey as Mehul
- Karan Lukha as Moksh
- Eva sher ali as Shruti
- Madhavi Kumar as Deepa
- Nishikant Dixit as Jeweller
- Ghanshyam Nayak as Lalit's client
- Rajesh Khera as Anurag
- Nagesh Bhonsle as Nagesh
- Kavita Kapoor as Kavita
- Smita Oak as Doctor
- Kiran Randhawa as Mehul's Mother
- Mahroo Sheikh as Mehul's Director
- Disha Vakani as Mehul's makeup artist
- Melanie Nazareth as Priya
- Atul Srivastava as Lalit's Assistant
- Kalindi as Leela's cousin
- Ishtiaque Khan as Neeraja's Boss
- Sonalia Kapadia as Neeraja's daughter
- Aditi Pandya as Older Rima
- Seema shinde as Neeraja's Professor
- Asha Singh as Neeraja's Aunt
- Shadab Khan as House Dealer
- Zubeda Khan as Victim
- Jaspir Thandi as Isha
- Baby Nida as Younger Bhavna
- Umang Jain as Younger Rima
- Rakesh Bidua as Hotel Receptionist
- Alka Kaushal as Lalit's Colleague
