= Balika Vadhu =

Indian drama television series

- Also known as: Balika Vadhu – Kacchi Umar Ke Pakke Rishte; Balika Vadhu – Lamhe Pyaar Ke
- Genre: Soap opera
- Written by: Purnendu Shekhar; Gajra Kottary; Rajesh Dubey; Usha Dixit; Raghuvir Shekhawat; Manisha Singh; Kovid Gupta; Raman Manaktala
- Directed by: Sidharth Sengupta; Pradeep Yadav
- Creative director: Siddhartha Vankar
- Starring: See below
- Country of origin: India
- Original language: Hindi
- No. of seasons: 2
- No. of episodes: 2,245

Production
- Executive producers: Zakir Shaikh; Sachin Chavan; Fuzel Khan
- Producers: Sunjoy Waddhwa; Comall Sunjoy W.
- Cinematography: Sanjay K. Memane; Anil Katke
- Editors: Santosh Singh; Janak Chauhan
- Camera setup: Multi-camera
- Running time: 20 minutes
- Production company: Sphere Origins

Original release
- Network: Colors TV
- Release: 21 July 2008 – 31 July 2016

Related
- Chhoti Anandi; Balika Vadhu 2

Balika Vadhu (transl. The Child Bride) is an Indian soap opera that aired on Colors TV between 21 July 2008 to 31 July 2016 with 2,245 episodes. The story is set in rural Rajasthan and revolves around the life of a child bride from childhood to womanhood.

== Background ==
The show consists of two parts. The first part, Balika Vadhu – Kacchi Umar Ke Pakke Rishte (transl. The Child Bride – Strong Relationships of Tender Age) ran for 2,164 episodes, and focused on Anandi and Jagdish, who were married during childhood. The second part, Balika Vadhu – Lamhe Pyaar Ke (transl. The Child Bride – Moments of Love) which ran for 84 episodes, reflects the life of Anandi's daughter, Dr. Nandini, also known as Nimboli, another child bride.

== Plot ==
Balika Vadhu follows the lives of Anandi and Jagdish, who were married as children, and the challenges they and their families face over several decades.

=== Part 1: Kacchi Umar Ke Pakke Rishte ===
An 8-year-old girl, Anandi is married to Jagdish "Jagya" Singh. Her schoolteacher fails in trying to stop the marriage. Jagya's widowed sister, Sugna, whose husband dies on the day they were supposed to marry, faces difficulty remarrying as she is pregnant. Though a local, Shyam asks Sugna's hand in marriage, Jagya doesn't approve of it. Later Jagdish and Anandi have final exams where Jagya performs poorly and fakes his report card. Jagya's father, Bhairon finds about it so he runs away to Mumbai, where some goons kidnap him. Anandi is shot while saving him, though she recovers. Later, Jagya's grandmother gets him married to a girl named Gauri, while still being married to Anandi; the maha panchayat declares it illegal. Since both Jagya and Anandi are going through changes, their families decide that they should stay away from each other until they're both adolescents worries that they may take a wrong step in their youth.

5 years later, Anandi returns to her in laws. Jagdish and Anandi are in love. Jagya is motivated to become a doctor when he is unable to find a doctor for an injured Anandi and goes to Mumbai to study. In meantime, he falls in love with his colleague, Gauri and insults Anandi for being uneducated.

4 years later, Jagdish completes his MBBS and wants to work and live in Mumbai. He meets Gauri again and decides to leave Anandi to marry her. They get married; Gauri believing that his child marriage is invalid. However, his family rejects them, leading Gauri to become vengeful towards them, which in turn disrupts her marital life with Jagdish. Bhairon asks Anandi to file a case against Jagdish, but she refuses, accepting his and Gauri's marriage. Meanwhile, Anandi completes her graduation and educates village girls, campaigns against child marriage, and becomes the Sarpanch Bitiya of Jaitsar, and meets district collector Shivraj Shekhar who is impressed by her. She sends divorce papers to Jagya, which he angrily signs. Jagya and Anandi get divorced and Anandi tries to move on. Meanwhile, Jagya gets to know how Gauri had separated him from his family and divorces her for cheating and vows to reunite with Anandi. However, Anandi having moved on, marries Shivraj, forgives Jagya, and moves to Udaipur. Anandi starts her own NGO and works for welfare of women, orphan children, physically handicapped and old age homes.

Sanchi, Shivraj's sister, develops a crush on Jagya. She however tries to create trouble in his family by creating misunderstandings and manipulating people. They get engaged and he returns to Mumbai to study. Six months later, he realizes that she only wants to marry him out of spite and calls-off the wedding. He marries Ganga, who was also a victim of child marriage, a girl whom he helped her get freed from her husband and in-laws who harassed her and get her educated as a nurse, and adopts her son Mannu while giving birth to their child Abhimanyu. Meanwhile, Jagya runs for political office and becomes the Vidhya of Jaitsar.

Anandi and Shivraj adopt a disabled orphan Amol, treat him and reunite him with his parents. Shivraj dies while trying to stop a terrorist attack as Anandi delivers twins Nandini and Shivam. Akhiraj, a goon, kidnaps Nandini and renames her Nimboli for marriage to his son Kundan.

11 years later, Jagya traces Nandini, and Akhiraj is arrested but escapes custody and kills Anandi as she protects her children. Jagya fatally shoots him, but the twins fall into a river and presumably die. They however survive and are put into an orphanage. They are separated when Shivam is arrested for murdering a man who tried to rape Nandini.

=== Part 2: Lamhe Pyaar Ke ===
15 years later, Nandini is a physician, driven by a promise to her dying mother to provide medical treatment throughout Rajasthan. She marries medical student Krish Malhotra, who she later learns is the step-son of Kundan. She also finds that the groom she approved for her adoptive sister Sudha is actually Shivam, who has become a gangster. She reunites with him. Kundan kidnaps her to force her to remarry him, but is killed by the police.

In the epilogue, she summarizes her family history from Anandi's childhood to her present in a book titled Balika Vadhu.

== Cast ==
=== Main ===
- Pratyusha Banerjee / Toral Rasputra as Anandi Shivraj Shekhar — Khajaan and Bhagwati's daughter; Shivraj's wife; Shivam and Nandini's mother (2010–2016)
  - Avika Gor Chandwani as child Anandi Khanjan Singh (2008–2010)
- Shashank Vyas / Shakti Anand as Jagdish Singh — Bhairon and Sumitra's son; Sugna's brother; Ganga's husband; Mahendra and Abhimanyu's father (2010–2015)
  - Avinash Mukherjee as child Jagdish (2008–2010)
- Sidharth Shukla as Shivraj Shekhar — Anoop and Meenakshi's son; Anandi's husband; Shivam and Nandini's father (2012–2015)
- Sriti Jha / Sargun Mehta / Aasiya Kazi as Ganga Jagdish Singh — Jagdish's wife; Mahendra and Abhimanyu's mother (2013–2016)
  - Roshni Walia as child Ganga (2013)
- Mahhi Vij as Nandini Krish Malhotra — Shivraj and Anandi's daughter; Shivam's sister; Krish's wife (2016)
  - Gracy Goswami as child Nandini Shekhar (2015–2016)
- Dishank Arora as Shivam Shekhar — Shivraj and Anandi's son; Nandini's brother; Sudha's husband (2016)
  - Viren Vazirani as child Shivam (2015–2016)
- Ruslaan Mumtaz as Krish Malhotra — Karuna's son; Nandini's husband (2016)
- Yukti Kapoor as Sudha Shivam Shekhar — Naren and Yamuna's daughter; Shivam's wife (2016)

=== Recurring ===
- Chetanya Adib as Khajaan Singh: Bhagwati's husband; Anandi's father; Shivam and Nandini's grandfather (2008–2015)
- Bhairavi Raichura as Bhagwati Singh: Khajaan's wife; Anandi's mother; Shivam and Nandini's grandmother (2008–2012)
- Surekha Sikri Rege as Kalyani Singh: Matriarch of Singhs; Dharamveer's wife; Bhairon's mother; Basant's adoptive mother; Jagdish and Sugna's grandmother; Nandkishore and Bhairavi's adoptive grandmother; Abhimanyu, Varun and Shagun's great-grandmother (2008–2016)
- Anup Soni as Bhairon Singh: Sumitra's husband; Jagdish and Sugna's father; Abhimanyu, Varun and Shagun's grandfather (2008–2014)
- Smita Bansal Mohla as Sumitra Singh: Bhairon's wife; Jagdish and Sugna's mother; Abhimanyu, Varun and Shagun's grandmother (2008–2014)
- Sachin Shroff as Shyam Singh: Madan and Radha's son; Sugna's husband; Varun and Shagun's father (2010–2013)
  - Vikrant Massey as teenage Shyam (2008–2010)
- Janvi Chheda as Sugna Singh: Bhairon and Sumitra's daughter; Shyam's wife; Varun and Shagun's mother (2010–2013)
  - Veebha Anand as teenage Sugna (2008–2010)
- Rajendra Gupta as Mahaveer Singh: Basant's father; Nandkishore and Bhairavi's grandfather (2008–2012)
- Satyajit Sharma as Basant Singh: Jamuna's widower; Gehna's husband; Nandkishore and Bhairavi's father (2008–2014)
- Neha Marda Agarwal as Gehna Singh: Basant's widow; Niranjan's wife; Nandkishore and Bhairavi's mother (2008–2012)
  - Sheetal Khandal replaced Agarwal as Gehna (2012–2015)
- Sanjay Basak as Nandkishore "Nandu" Singh: Basant and Gehna's son; Bhairavi's brother (2014–2015)
  - Rishi Sonecha / Keval Katrodia / Mayur Mondal as child Nandkishore (2010–2014)
- Vinay Yadav as Maakhan: a maid in Kalyani's house
- Farida Jalal as Vasundhara Devi: Kalyani's elder sister (2009-2012)
- Rahuol Lohani as Niranjan: Gehna's music teacher and second husband; Nandu and Bhairavi's step-father (2009–2010; 2014–2015)
- Shashwat Joshi as Abhimanyu "Abhi" Singh: Jagdish and Ganga's son; Mahendra's half-brother (2015)
- Mamta Chaturya as Phooli: Anandi's best friend since childhood (2010–2012)
  - Faiza Faiz as child Phooli (2008–2010)
- Pankaj Jha Kashyap as Meena's elder brother (2010)
- Pushpendra Singh as Jagan: Phooli's father
- Shivshakti Sachdev as Champa: Anandi's childhood friend; Gulli's mother (2008)
- Nidhi Jha and Sonam Lamba as Gulli: Lalan and Champa's daughter; Hardik's wife (2011–2014)
  - Netra Kapoor / Digangana Suryavanshi as child Gulli
- Kishan Bhan as Shambhu: Gehna, Kanchan and Rama's father; Nandu and Bhairavi's grandfather
- Chitra Jetly/Neha Pakai as Urmila: Gehna, Kanchan and Rama's mother; Nandu and Bhairavi's grandmother
- Garima Anand as Kanchan: Manish's wife
- Jehangir Vakil as Pratap: Hukum and Meena's son; Sugna's late husband; Varun's father (2008–2009) (Dead)
- Shivansh Kotia and Rudra Soni as Varun Singh: Pratap and Sugna's son; Shyam's step-son; Shagun's half-brother (2010)/(2011–2013)
- Unknown/Yamini Makwana as Shagun: Shyam and Sugna's daughter; Varun's younger half-sister (2010)/(2011–2013)
- Amar Sharma as Madan Singh: Radha's husband; Shyam's father; Varun's step-grandfather; Shagun's grandfather (2008–2014)
- Asmita Sharma/Rashmi Shaw as Madan's wife; Shyam's mother; Varun's step-grandmother; Shagun's grandmother (2008–2010)
- Sudhir Pandey as Premkishore Shekhar: Anoop and Alok's father; Shiv, Sanchi and Mahi's grandfather; Nandini and Shivam's great-grandfather; Amol's adoptive great-grandfather (2012–2015)
- Avinash Wadhawan / Akshay Anand as Anoop Shekhar: Premkishore's elder son; Alok's elder brother; Meenakshi's husband; Shiv and Mahi's father; Nandini and Shivam's grandfather; Amol's adoptive grandfather (2013–2015)
- Anita Kulkarni as Meenakshi Shekhar: Anoop's wife; Shiv and Mahi's mother; Nandini and Shivam's grandmother; Amol's adoptive grandmother (2012–2015)
- Jaineeraj Rajpurohit as Alok Shekhar: Premkishore's younger son; Anoop's younger brother; Iravati's husband; Saanchi's father (2012–2015)
- Sonal Jha as Iravati Shekhar: Alok's wife; Saanchi's mother (2012–2015)
- Roop Durgapal as Sanchi Shekhar Kabra: Alok and Iravati's daughter; Vivek's wife (2012–2015)
- Abhishek Tewari as Mahi Shekhar: Anoop and Meenakshi's younger son; Shivraj's younger brother (2012–2014)
- Khushmeet Gill/Shubham Jha as Raju Mehta/Amol Shekhar: Shiv and Anandi's adopted son; Nandini and Shivam's adopted brother (2014–2015)
- Sushmita Mukherjee as Subhadra "Swananda": Premkishore's younger sister; Hardik's grandmother (2014–2015)
- Gaurav Bajaj as Hardik: Subhadra's grandson; Gulli's husband (2014)
- Bobby Parvez as Roshan Kabra: Suman's husband, Vivek, Saurabh and Rakhi's father (2014)
- Shalini Arora as Suman Kabra: Roshan's wife; Vivek, Saurabh and Rakhi's mother (2014–2015)
- Vimarsh Roshan as Advocate Vivek Kabra: Roshan and Suman's elder son; Saurabh and Rakhi's elder brother; Saanchi's husband (2013–2015)
- Siddharth Shivpuri/Sonal Handa as Saurabh Kabra: Roshan and Suman's son; Vivek and Rakhi's brother
- Farhina Parvez Jarimari as Rakhi Kabra: Roshan and Suman's younger daughter; Vivek and Saurabh's younger sister (2014)
- Abhijit Lahiri as Ramcharan Singh: Madan's elder brother (2009–2010)
- Zubeida Verma as Ramcharan's wife
- Smita Dongre as Kamla: Umaan's wife; Gauri's mother
- Unknown/Sunil Chauhan as Umaan Singh: Ram's brother; Kamla's husband; Gauri's father
- Tarakesh Chauhan as Ram Singh: Umaan's brother
- Nivedita Bhattacharya as Shivani Rajadhyaksha (2011, 2014)
- Arpit Joshi and Suneet Surana and Semal Bhatt as Lal Singh: Koyal's husband; Jagdish's friend (2010–2012)
- Unknown/Raquel Rebello as Koyal: Lal Singh's wife
- Urmila Sharma in double role as
  - Mangali: a villager of Jaitsar
  - Kanchan: Bharat's mother
- Sumit Malhan as Bharat: Phooli's second husband
- Svetlana Mishra as Chaturi: Bharat's first wife
- Chandresh Singh as Ratan Singh: Ganga's ex-husband; Mannu's father (2013–2015)
- Harsh Mehta as Mahendra "Mannu" Singh: Ratan and Ganga's son; Jagdish's step-son; Abhimanyu's half-brother; Pooja's husband (2015–2016)
  - Dhairya Ashani as child Mahendra "Mannu" Singh (2014–2015)
- Ghanshyam Srivastava as Ghanshyam: an uncle who took care of Mannu when Ganga went to medical school in Mangalore
- Ankit Gupta as Dr. Abhishek Singh: Asha's second husband (2012–2013)
- Vineet Kumar Chaudhary as Kundan Singh: Akheeraj and Harki's son; Kamli's younger brother; Nandini and Urmi's ex-husband; Krish's step-father (2016)
  - Sparsh Srivastav and Karan Pahwa as Teenage Kundan Singh (2015–2016)
- Sunil Singh as Akheeraj Singh: Harki's husband; Kamli and Kundan's father (2015–2016)
- Rudrakshi Gupta as Harki: Akheeraj's wife; Kamli and Kundan's mother (2015–2016)
- Farah Hussain as Kamli Singh: Akheeraj and Harki's daughter; Kundan's elder sister; Pushkar's wife (2015–2016)
- Rajeshwari Sachdev as Mangaladevi: Nandini's mother-figure (2015–2016)
- Meenakshi Arya as Geeta: Akheeraj's younger sister
- Sunil Palwal as Pooran: Geeta's husband
- Madhvi Chopra as Chaggani: a maid at Akheeraj's house
- Simran Natekar as Pooja: Sarita's daughter; Mannu's wife (2015)
- Dimple Kava/Raginee Risshi as Sarita: Pooja's mother
- Parichay Sharma as Pushkar: Jatashankar and Bhagirathi's mentally ill son; Kamli's husband (2015–2016)
- Abhay Joshi as Jatashankar: Pushkar's father
- Jhumma Mitra as Bhagirathi: Pushkar's mother
- Mahmood Hashmi in a dual role as
  - Chanda's husband
  - Pushkar's uncle
- Tisha Kapoor as Urmi: Khetaram and Saraswati's daughter; Kundan's ex-wife (2015)
- Madan Tyagi as Khetaram: Urmi's father
- Anjali Gupta as Saraswati: Urmi's mother
- Deepali Muchrikar / Vidhi Pandya as Nidhi: Anant and Pushpa's daughter (2015–2016)
- Hiten Tejwani as Dr. Anant: a Pediatric doctor; Pushpa's husband; Nidhi's father (2015–2016)
- Malini Kapoor as Pushpa: Anant's wife; Nidhi's mother
- Shahab Khan as Naren Shekhawat: Yamuna's husband; Sudha's father; Nandini's adoptive father (2016)
- Neetu Pandey as Yamuna Shekhawat: Naren's wife; Sudha's mother; Nandini's adoptive mother (2016)
- Kavita Vaid as Yamuna's mother; Sudha's grandmother; Nandini's adoptive grandmother (2016)
- Ayush Anand as Premal Singh: Santhalia and Pavitra's son; Sudha's ex-husband (2016)
- Vinod Anand as Santhalia: Pavitra's husband; Premal's father
- Hetal Yadav as Pavitra: Santhalia's wife; Premal's mother (2016)
- Sonia Shah as Karuna Malhotra: Kundan's wife; Krish's mother (2016)
- Nimisha Vakharia as Triveni: Karuna's elder sister
- Sadiya Siddiqui as Sandhya: Anandi's school teacher (2008–2013)
- Anjum Farooki as Dr. Gauri Singh: Jagdish's ex-wife (2010–2014)
  - Deblina Chatterjee as Gauri Singh (2014) (after plastic surgery)
  - Mahima Makwana as child Gauri Singh (2009–2010)
- Bhakti Narula as Bhanwari: matchmakers from Bilaria village
- Ashok Banthia as Village Chief of Bilaria
- Yogendra Kumaria as the doctor who treated Jamuna
- Farida Dadi as Mithi: the traditional midwife who assisted Jamuna's delivery
- Ashok Awasthi as Village Chief of Jaitsar
- Jay Pathak as Madhav: Sumitra's younger brother
- Raj Khanna/Deepak Dutta as Hukum Singh: Meena's husband; Pratap's father; Varun's grandfather
- Aayush Shah as Jagdish's school friend
- Aekansh Vats as Sunder: Jagdish's schoolmates who had a bad influence on Jagdish
- Priya Ahuja as Suman: Shyam first met Suman when Shyam was in town and helped Suman's mother from a wheelchair accident
- Rajesh Kareer as one of the criminal gangs of the child abduction syndicate in Mumbai town
- Sakshi Tanwar as Teepri: Bhairon's childhood friend (2010)
- Manav Sohal as Teepri's husband (2010)
- Navika Kotia as Teepri's daughter (2010)
- Smita Oak as Kunda: the landlord who rented out his house to Jagdish and Gauri in Mumbai
- Amita Udgata as Kusumkaali: Kalyani's best friend
- Sanjay Batra as Heth Singh: a politician
- Mandar Jadhav/Saurrabh Kushwaha as Sooraj: Heth Singh's son
- Fahad Ali as Shravan
- Rajkumar Kanojia as Bheem Singh: Shiv's personal assistant
- Karmveer Choudhary as Shambhu: a contractor
- Ajay Sharma as Keval Ram
- Reena Aggarwal as Ashima: Shiv's friend (2012–2013)
- Pavitra Sarkar as Balachandran: hospital nurse in Mangalore who harassed Ganga
- Dinesh Soni as Natthu Lal: maid at Shiv's house
- Maleeka R. Ghai as Nirmala: matchmakers from Jaitsar village
- Farnaz Shetty as Kanchan (2013)
- Mohit Abrol as Anuj
- Mandar Jadhav as Mihir
- Anshul Singh as Manish: Kanchan's husband
- Prairna Agarwal as Ratna: Manish's mother
- Madan Joshi as Chief Minister of Rajasthan
- Amardeep Jha as Suhasini
- Pubali Sanyal as Sonali Das: orphanage foundation board
- Sushma Prashant as Sarla: the nurse who had assisted Iravati's delivery
- Kamalika Guha Thakurta as Pramila (2014)
- Saptrishi Ghosh as Jindal: a public prosecutor in court
- Shivraj D. Walvekar as the lawyer Mr. Bundela
- Naveen Saini as Sumeet Raghuvanshi: Sanchi's defense lawyer
- Massheuddin Qureshi as Brijesh Sanghvi
- Shweta Mahadik as Rasika: Narendra's widow; Shiv's secretary
- Kartik Soni as Narendra: Rasika's late husband
- Sanjay Bhatiya as Narendra's father
- Reshmaa Merchant as Sushma: Narendra's mother
- Arjun Aneja as Mr. Mittal: Sanchi's boss
- Akash Khurana as Shamal: a politician
- Harsh Chhaya as Palash Shindia: a painter (2014)
- Niveen A. Ramani as Alan: Palash's assistant
- Parveen Kaur as Kalyani's teacher
- Sanskrati Sharma as Kajal: Kalyani's classmate
- Saniya Touqeer as Jhoomar: a student who experienced a case of child abuse
- Nimai Bali as L. P. Shrivastav: Sona's husband
- Geetanjali Mishra as Kkusum and Sona (2014–2015)
- Shital Antani as Kkusum's mother
- Gaurav Hans as Giridhar: a villager who recognized Sona
- Ankur Sharma Kabir as Raghav: Ganga's kidnappers
- Rumi Khan as the terrorist who died along with Shiv
- Nishant Paliwal as Madhav: Kundan's best friend
- Rishi Dev as Gopal: Chaganlal's son; Kamli's ex-lover (2015)
- Abhay Vardhan as Kailash: Gopal's best friend
- Abhay Keshari as Kundan's friend in juvenile prison
- Sanki Shailendra as Kundan's friend in juvenile prison
- Jayant Trivedi as Deenu: Akheeraj's friend
- Bhupesh Singh as Badri: Akheeraj's friend
- Hiteeka Ruchchandran as Madhura: a girl who was about to be sacrificed to a cult, and Nimboli rescued her
- Khushali Hirani as Kavitha: the girl who was kidnapped by Akheeraj
- Avinash Sachdev as Dr. Amit Goel (2016)
- Prithvi Sankhala as Dr. Naresh Goel (2016)
- Smriti Khanna as Dr. Vandana Mittal (2016)

== Reception ==
=== Ratings ===
Balika Vadhu became one of the most watched Hindi GEC in its runtime and is one of the shows which helped get newly launched channel Colors TV to the first position in Hindi GEC, beating the nine years top position maintained by Star Plus.

Balika Vadhu was met with mixed responses. While some appreciated it for portraying the issues of child marriage, some criticised the show for glorifying it. The series had a very low initial rating of 0.7 TVR, but by five weeks after launch, it had entered the top five most-watched Hindi GEC and had become Colors TV's top programme.

In five weeks after launch, it entered the top five most-watched Hindi GEC. Thus, Balika Vadhu helped Colors TV's top positioning a lot. Balika Vadhu often held top position mostly on the ratings charts from 2008 to 2013.

In week 11 of 2009, it occupied third position with 5.9 TVR. On 13 June 2009, it was at fourth position with 5.3 TVR. In week 11 of 2010, it occupied top position and garnered 7.7 TVR. In week 30 of 2010, it occupied with the top position with 6.9 TVR.

On 28 May 2011, it occupied the top position with 4.91 TVR. In week 24 of 2011, it was at second position with 4.81 TVR. In first two weeks of August 2011, it garnered 6.1 and 5.2 TVRs maintaining its top position. In the first week of 2012, it occupied the second position with 4.76 TVR. In week 50 of 2012, it was at top position with 5.8 TVR. In last week of July 2013, it was at second position with 3.9 TVR.

=== Critics ===
The series was addressed in Indian Parliaments during 2009, prompting the Ministry of Information and Broadcasting to stop its telecast, condemning it for portraying child marriage against the Indian constitutional law.

== Sequel and spin-off ==
A reboot of the show, named Balika Vadhu 2, aired on the same channel from 9 August 2021 to 29 March 2022.

An animated series, Chhoti Anandi, was launched in 2016. The show focuses on the adventures of an eight year old Anandi and her friends. It was simulcasted on Colors TV and Rishtey from January to April 2016. The animation was provided by HopMotion animation studio.
