= Mrunalini Patil =

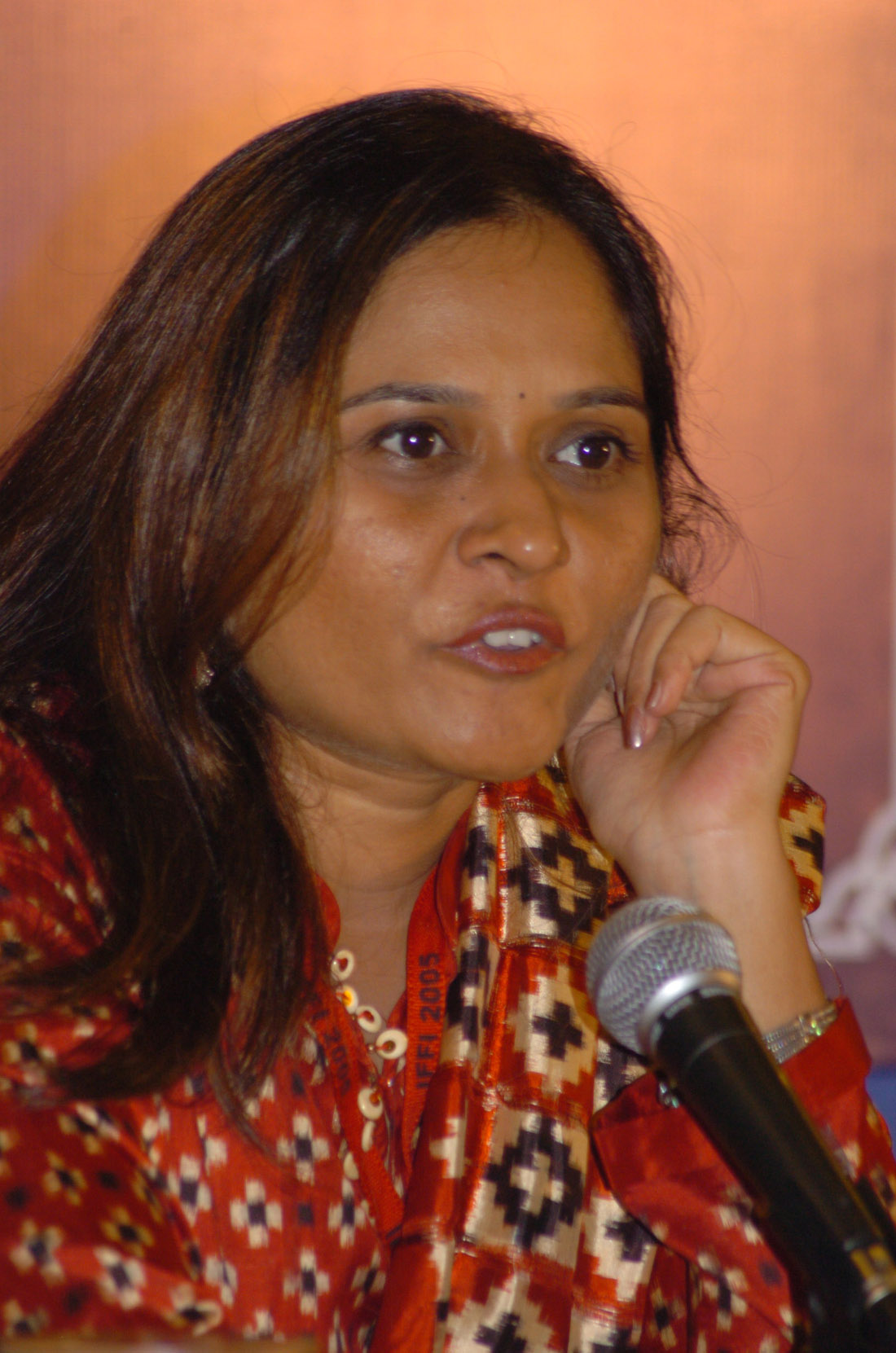
- Mrinalini, IFFI (2005)
- Born: Mumbai, India
- Education: MBBS
- Occupations: Film director and producer
- Years active: 1993-present
- Organization: Suryaa Films Kreation
- Children: Shivam Patil, Amruta Patil
- Parent: Suryakanta Patil
- Website: suryaafilmskreation.com

Mrunalinni Patil is an Indian director and producer known for her work in Hindi and Marathi cinema. She is most known for her films Kagaar: Life on the Edge(2003), Manthan: Ek Amrut Pyala (2006), Raakhandaar (2014) and Kaay Raav Tumhi(2015)

== Filmography ==
=== Marathi films ===
Year	Title	Contribution	Cast
2006	Manthan: Ek Amrut Pyala	Director, Producer	Padmini Kolhapure, Milind Gunaji, Asawari Joshi, Vijay Kadam
2014	Raakhandaar	Director, Producer	Ajinkya Deo, Jitendra Joshi, Anuja Sathe, Yatin Karyekar
2015	Kaay Raav Tumhi	Director, Producer	Yatin Karyekar, Ravindra Mahajani, Satish Pulekar, Hemant Dhome, Niyati Joshi

=== Hindi films ===
Year	Title	Contribution	Cast
2003	Kagaar: Life on the Edge	Producer	Om Puri, Nandita Das, Amitabh Dayal, Anup Soni
2015	Karbonn	Director	Amitabh Dayal, Lakshmi Gopalaswamy, Raj Babbar, Padmini Kolhapure, Rati Agnihotri

== Television ==
Original Run	Name	Contribution	Language	Network
2007 – present	"SID Faarz"	Producer	Hindi	DD National

== See also ==
- Shivam Patil
