= Raakhandaar =

- Marathi: राखणदार
- Directed by: Mrunalinni Patil
- Written by: Aanand More
- Produced by: Mrunalinni Patil
- Starring: Ajinkya Deo; Jitendra Joshi; Anuja Sathe; Yatin Karyekar
- Cinematography: Jehangir Choudhary
- Music by: Kanakraj
- Production company: Suryaa Films Kreation
- Release date: 26 September 2014
- Running time: 128 minutes
- Country: India
- Language: Marathi

Raakhandaar (Marathi: राखणदार) is a 2014 Fiction, Philosophy, Drama Marathi film directed & produced by Mrunalinni Patil. It stars Jitendra Joshi, Anuja Sathe, Ajinkya Deo in lead roles The film was released on 26 September 2014.

== Plot ==
Is a story about faith in god and his existence. Sadanad is poor chap who somehow meets his ends by working in a company workshop, he is a happy go lucky kind of a person even after he has been thrown out of his job he keeps his faith and eventually starts his own business. Who will help him start his business? How will he mate with the love of his life? Will they able to live happily ever after? Who is trying to prove his faith wrong?

== Synopsis ==
Jitendra Joshi deserves kudos for underplaying his role while Ajinkya Deo passes muster as the Khandoba. While Yatin Karyerkar is just about okay, Anuja Sathe scores in her debut role as an actress. Choreography is excellent in the film and the director deserves kudos for the way she has handled the film without boring you.

Though the film is a feel good film, what mars it is the fact that it takes the viewers back to the 70's when such goody goody tales about how a man succeeds in life thanks to God's help were popular.

The film has an old world charm about it and appeals to the families.

== Cast ==
- Ajinkya Deo as Khushaba
- Jitendra Joshi as Sadanand Lokre
- Anuja Sathe As Madhavi
- Yatin Karyekar

== Soundtrack ==
The soundtrack of Raakhandaar was composed by Kanakraj.

Track No	Song	Singer	Music Composed By	Lyrics	Length
1	"Tujhya Mule"	Rohit Raut & Vaishali Samant	Kanak Raj	FA, Mu. Shinde, Shiv Kadam	4:49
2	"Chandrama"	Swapnil Bandodkar & Kavita Krishnamurthy	Kanak Raj	FA, Mu. Shinde, Shiv Kadam	6:32
3	"Khandoba"	Sukhwinder Singh	Kanak Raj	FA, Mu. Shinde, Shiv Kadam	5:00
4	"Nahi Sadhu Kivha Me Santa"	Rohit Raut	Kanak Raj	FA, Mu. Shinde, Shiv Kadam	3:55
5	"Tu Ya Jagacha Rakhandaar"	Sukhwinder Singh	Kanak Raj	FA, Mu. Shinde, Shiv Kadam	7:45
6	"Angai"	Shankar Mahadevan	Kanak Raj	FA, Mu. Shinde, Shiv Kadam	5:42
7	"Tandav" (Instrumental Version)	Kanak Raj	Kanak Raj	FA, Mu. Shinde, Shiv Kadam	2:54
