= Hamare Tumhare (TV series) =

2001 Indian finite TV series

- Genre: Drama
- Screenplay by: Gajra Kottary
- Story by: Gajra Kottary
- Directed by: Rajan Shahi
- Creative director: Mahesh Bhatt
- Starring: Pallavi Joshi; Nandita Puri; Akshay Anand; Vishal Malhotra; Yatin Karyekar
- Ending theme: "Hai yeh jo rishtey hamare tumhare..."
- Country of origin: India
- Original language: Hindi
- No. of episodes: 30

Production
- Producers: Soni Razdan; Mukesh Bhatt
- Running time: 18–21 minutes
- Production company: Vishesh Films

Original release
- Network: Zee TV
- Release: 2001 – 2001

Hamare Tumhare (transl. Ours, Yours) is an Indian Hindi-language weekly drama (Note: Quoting BizAsiaLive, "A weekly drama Hamare Tumhare is also making its debut in the UK in July.") television series that aired on Zee TV on Sundays in India in 2001, starring Pallavi Joshi and Nandita Puri. It was directed by Rajan Shahi and written by Gajra Kottary. It was produced by Soni Razdan and Mukesh Bhatt under the banner, Vishesh Films.

== Premise ==
Vishnupriya Sengupta of The Telegraph noted in a 2007 report of hers that the television series, "[...] revolved around the friction between two sisters, emanating out of a shared bitter past."

== Cast ==
- Pallavi Joshi as Ruchika
- Akshay Anand as Ketan
- Vishal Malhotra as Rishabh
- Nandita Puri as Radhika
- Yatin Karyekar as Dilip
- Gauri Karnik as Riya
- Rushad Rana as Gautam
- Amardeep Jha as Ketan's mother
- Mehul Nisar as Mehul

== Episodes ==
No.	Directed by	Written by
1	Rajan Shahi	Gajra Kottary
Ruchika is wished birthday with rose petals by her husband, Ketan, and later by her children. Ruchika asks Ketan if there was any telephone call while she was asleep and he tells there wasn't. She wistfully reminisces of her childhood when Radhika, her elder sister, would joyously celebrate her birthday. Rishabh, Radhika's son is packing his bags for studying abroad, when Radhika sees the calendar showing the date, 15 July, Ruchika's birthday and she gets emotional. Later that day, Ketan is buying a gift for Ruchika, a film camera, when he and Radhika bump into each other and she recommends he buy Ruchika's favourite perfume, Chanel No. 5. Ketan tells her that Ruchika misses her. Radhika gets angry and denies that being true. As he's telling her she and Ruchika should reconcile with each other, Ruchika also comes there and bumps into them. Ketan starts taking their photographs. Radhika gets furious, breaks the camera and walks away. Ruchika expresses sadness about what's happened during dinner with Ketan. While Radhika's family is having the dinner at their home, Radhika collapses on the bathroom floor.

== Production ==
=== Development ===
Kottary had sent a copy of her first book, Fragile Victories, to filmmaker Mahesh Bhatt, who later on passed it to Razdan, his wife. She was impressed by her work and signed Kottary up to write the story and screenplay for her maiden production, the television series, Hamare Tumhare.

Having observed the sensitive treatment of human emotions by Shahi in his directorial debut, Dil Hai Ki Maanta Nahin, a romantic television series, starring Rupali Ganguly and Vishal Singh, that aired in 2000, Razdan had offered the opportunity to Shahi to be the director of Hamare Tumhare.

=== Filming ===
Only a finite number of episodes were filmed. (Note: Quoting Razdan in her interview with Indian Television Dot Com, "But as far as the winding up of my serial Hamare Tumhare goes, in all fairness to Zee, we had been asked not to shoot beyond a given number of episodes and we had not exceeded that.")

Mahesh Bhatt served as the creative director of the television series.

== Release ==
Hamare Tumhare was released among 17 new programmes of Zee TV in early 2001 alongside Aanchal ke Chaoon Main, Ankahee, Gardish and Samandar.

== Reception ==
Mukesh Khosla of The Tribune noted, "The saving grace of the serial are performances of the two estranged sisters — Ruchika and Radhika — played by Pallavi Joshi and Nandita Puri respectively. Ruchika the milder of the two is ready to forgive and forget, but Radhika is adamant about never seeing her sister again. That’s when Radhika falls critically ill and has, perforce, to leave her two kids in the care of the sister she hates so much. Ruchika has two children of her own and there is instant hostility between them." He concluded, "From then onwards, the serial climbs a moral pedestal and talks about the virtues of love, forgiveness and harmony. The storyline too loses it [sic] tempo, making Hamare Tumhare a forgettable fare."
