= Shikaar (2004 film) =

- Directed by: Darshan Bagga
- Produced by: Surjit Pandher
- Starring: Jas Pandher; Kanishka Kapoor
- Edited by: Sanjay Verma
- Music by: Anand Raj Anand
- Release date: 2 July 2004
- Country: India
- Language: Hindi

Shikaar is a 2004 Bollywood action thriller film directed by Darshan Bagga. The film stars Jaz Pandher and Kanishka Kapoor in lead roles with Raj Babbar, Danny Denzongpa, Prem Chopra, Shakti Kapoor, Ashish Vidyarthi, Tej Sapru, Shweta Menon and Saadhika Randhawa in supporting roles.

== Plot ==
Madhu lives a wealthy lifestyle in Mussoorie and operates Hotel Savoy. She meets with and falls in love with Vijay Sanyal and shortly thereafter both of them get married. After the marriage, her friend, Julie, and her mom notice a change in Vijay but do not tell Madhu about this, leaving Vijay free to get Madhu to sign a power of attorney in his favor. He runs the hotel, but eventually finds that it is not doing too well, and decides to sell it to Darshan Damania and his partners, Mirza Ashraf Baig, Chhadha, Nikhil Chopra and Kanwar Singh much to Madhu's displeasure. The partners, with two of Darshan's girlfriends, Kamya, and Rama in tow, arrive in Mussorie to sign the documents. The only one missing is Mirza, who had stated that he will be arriving later. Instead, however, ACP Sumed Singh arrives to inform them that Mirza has been killed in a car explosion.

Julie witnesses the murder of Mirza and is killed by the murderer for being the witness. Madhu witnesses the murder of Julie but is unable to see the murderer. As Julie is dying, Madhu asks Julie about the killer's name and Julie tells that her that it was Vijay, since Vijay wants to murder Damania and his friends. Sumed inquires Madhu about the killer but she tries to hide the truth from the police officer. Vijay arrives at the spot and argues with Sumed not to torture Madhu, on which Sumed threatens Vijay to call him to the police station. Madhu learns that Vijay has signed a deal to sell the hotel to Damania and his partners on which Madhu argues with Vijay for selling the hotel that had been built by her father but Vijay shuts her up by saying that he is her husband and he has the right to do anything with the hotel.

Sumed finds a document containing a loan of 3 crores given by Mirza but the receiver's name is missing, on which Sumed suspects Damania and his partners. On that night, Kanwar goes to visit Rama at her bedroom where he seduces her and informs her that Mirza had told him that he had given the loan to Rama and decides to threaten her that he will tell Sumed about it if she does not spend a night with him and give him half of the money of the loan. Rama agrees and Kanwar goes to a bar to drink. Wearing a black coat, Vijay hears all the conversation. Kanwar receives a phone call in which he is invited by Rama to her bedroom but as he goes at the bedroom, he is thrown down at the floor by the person in black coat. Rama sees Kanwar's dead body on the next morning and Vijay arrives at the spot. He suspects her of killing him but Rama tries to convince Vijay that she did not kill Kanwar. The two decide to hide his dead body.

However, after a while, Kanwar's dead body is missing and Kamya also disappears. Sumed finds Kanwar's clothes near a lake. Damania and his partners are surprised that Kanwar has been missing for so many days. Vijay visits them with the agreement of the hotel. Sumed arrives and informs them that Kanwar has been killed and suspects that the killer is someone among those four. He leaves. Damania's partners Chopra and Chaddha are afraid for their lives. Chopra packs his clothes and decides to leave the hotel. Chaddha joins him and the two suspect Damania and Rama of killing the rest of the group. Chopra and Chaddha leave the hotel in a car but get stuck in a forest where the killer in black suit attacks them and kills both of them. The police catches the killer but the killer escapes. Vijay is shown running to his hotel room. Meanwhile, Madhu hears the conversation of the policemen that the killer of Damania's partners wears a black coat. As Vijay enters his room, Madhu is shocked to see him in a black coat and argues that he is the killer. Vijay tells her to keep quiet but Sumed Singh arrests Vijay.

Sumed and the policemen beat Vijay in the jail because he refuses to accept that he has killed Damania's partners. Vijay finally agrees that he wanted to kill Damania and his partners and he had invited them to Mussoorie for the same purpose but failed to achieve his mission because whenever he tried to kill Damania's partners, someone else killed them. Sumed refuses to believe Vijay but he receives a phone call that the killer in black suit is going to kill Damania. Vijay is released as he is not the killer. The killer kills Rama at a disco. The killer attacks Damania and Damania is shocked to know that the killer is Kamya. Kamya tells Damania that she is the daughter of bank manager Suraj Nagpal, who used to be Damania's friend. He had given a loan of 10 crores to Damania and his friends but they killed him instead of returning the loan. Kamya's mother died of stress and her younger brother Rohit left the house to avenge the deaths of his parents from Damania. She tells Damania that Rohit is still lost and she has spent her entire life as a call girl in searching of her lost brother and her father's murderers.

Vijay arrives at the spot and hears the conversation. He learns that Kamya is his sister because he is Rohit Nagpal, the son of Suraj Nagpal and he has also the same mission of killing Damania and his partners as Kamya has. Rohit also wants to avenge the murder of his father. Damania tries to kill Kamya but Vijay fights Damania and almost kills him until Damania breaks a bottle of wine on Vijay's head. He tries to stab Vijay with the broken bottle but Kamya quickly grabs a knife and runs into Damania and as their bodies collide, Kamya stabs Damania in his belly with the knife and at the same time, Damania stabs Kamya in her belly with the broken bottle. Kamya taunts Damania as he dies and later Kamya dies in the arms of Vijay.

== Cast ==
- Jas Pandher as Vijay Sanyal / Rohit Nagpal
- Kanishka Sodhi as Madhu Sanyal
- Raj Babbar as ACP Sumedh Singh
- Saadhika Randhawa as Kamya Nagpal
- Danny Denzongpa as Darshan Damania
- Prem Chopra as Nikhil Chopra
- Shakti Kapoor as Chaddha
- Ashish Vidyarthi as Kanwar Singh
- Tej Sapru as Mirza Ashraf Baig
- Shweta Menon as Rama Sahai
- Anil Dhawan as Suraj Nagpal
- Mushtaq Khan as Parvez
- Master Rohan as Young Rohit Nagpal
- Baby Drishti as Young Kamya Nagpal
- Monicka in an item number

== Soundtrack ==
The music of the film has been composed by Anand Raj Anand and the songs have been written by Dev Kohli and Praveen Bhardwaj.

#	Song	Singers	Length
1.	"Tumpe Marne Lage Hain"	Udit Narayan, Alka Yagnik	05:51
2.	"Dil Kisi Ka Dil"	Sonu Nigam, Shreya Ghoshal	04:27
3.	"Jitna Bhi Karlo Pyar"	Udit Narayan, Alka Yagnik	05:02
4.	"Pyar Mein Ai Mere Humdum"	Abhijeet Bhattacharya	05:34
5.	"Nazron Se Nazron Ko"	Alisha Chinai	03:33
6.	"Jaane Janna Jaane Jaana"	Sunidhi Chauhan	04:56
7.	"Nazar Nazar"	Sunidhi Chauhan	04:08
8.	"O Jiya Kya Kiya"	Udit Narayan, Vinod Rathod, Anand Raj Anand, Sunidhi Chauhan	04:40
9.	"Sona Sona Dil De"	Udit Narayan	04:39
