= Match Fixing (film) =

Indian Hindi language political thriller film directed by Kedaar Gaekwad

Match Fixing: The Nation At Stake
- Theatrical Poster
- Directed by: Kedar Gaekwad
- Written by: Anuj S Mehta; Sameer Garud
- Based on: The Game Behind Saffron Terror by Col. Kanwar Khatana (Retd.)
- Produced by: Pallavi Gurjar
- Starring: Vineet Kumar Singh; Anuja Sathe; Manoj Joshi
- Cinematography: Kedar Prabhakar Gaekwad; Ninad Gosavi
- Edited by: Ashish Mhatre
- Music by: Hrishi Giridhar; Rimi Dhar
- Production company: Artarena Creations
- Release date: 10 January 2025
- Running time: 146 minutes
- Country: India
- Language: Hindi

Match Fixing: The Nation At Stake is an Indian Hindi-language political thriller film directed by Kedar Gaekwad and produced by Pallavi Gurjar under ArtArena Creations Pvt. Ltd. Film is based on the book The Game Behind Saffron Terror written by Retired Col. Kanwar Khatana. The film stars Vineet Kumar Singh, Anuja Sathe and Manoj Joshi.

The film was released on January 10, 2025.

== Synopsis ==
The Nation at Stake sheds light on a boiling conspiracy operating on two fronts: the internal politics within India, centered on the divisive narrative of 'Saffron Terror,' and the calculated strategies of Pakistan's high command and intelligence networks to destabilize India, resulting in the 26/11 attacks. The movie offers a stark revelation of power games and their far-reaching consequences.

== Cast ==
- Vineet Kumar Singh as Avinash Patwardhan
- Raj Arjun as Col. Imam
- Manoj Joshi as Pervez Musharraf
- Ekavali Khanna as Rubia
- Shataf Figar as Parvez Kayani
- Anuja Sathe as Anuradha Patwardhan
- Lalit Parimoo as Ranvijay Singh
- Kishor Kadam as Savant Karmarkar
- Rajesh Tripathi as Zubair Naik
- Rajeev Pandey as Hafiz Saeed
- Ramanjit Kaur as Asifa Andrabi
- Elena Tuteja

== Controversy ==
The film was earlier scheduled to be released in theatres on 15 November 2024 but a petition was filed in the Bombay High Court to stop its release. The petition stated that the film promotes negative stereotypes against Muslims.

But the Bombay High Court dismissed the petition, and saying that the film is a work of fiction and gave the green signal for its release.

== Release ==
The film is scheduled to release in theatres on 10 January 2025.

== Reception ==
Ganesh Aglave from Firstpost described the film as a "slow, complicated, verbose political thriller" but lauded Vineet Kumar Singh's shining performance, noting his ability to carry the narrative despite the film's convoluted storytelling. Dhaval Roy of The Times of India gave a balanced review, appreciating the film's intense political drama and Singh's compelling portrayal but pointing out that the slow pacing and dense plot might not appeal to all audiences.

Pankaj Shukla of Amar Ujala praised the film's exploration of the Malegaon bomb blast and its political undertones, crediting Singh's intense portrayal and the director's vision, though he noted some narrative inconsistencies. A reviewer from Jagran labeled it a "must-watch thrilling ride through politics and terrorism," emphasizing Singh's stellar performance and the film's ability to keep viewers engaged with its suspenseful plot. Madhav Sharma of Times Now Hindi stated that the political drama "is going to leave you speechless," commending its bold storytelling, Singh's commanding presence, and the film's ability to tackle sensitive themes effectively.
