= Hafta Vasuli =

- Directed by: Deepak Balraj Vij
- Written by: Salim Hyder
- Screenplay by: Yunus Sajawal
- Story by: Salim Hyder
- Produced by: Deepak Balraj Vij
- Starring: Jackie Shroff; Aditya Pancholi; Ayub Khan; Madhoo; Saadhika Randhawa
- Cinematography: Kishore Kapadia
- Edited by: Prashant Khedekar; Vinod Nayak
- Music by: Rajesh Roshan
- Distributed by: Seven Mountain Movies
- Release date: 30 January 1998
- Country: India
- Language: Hindi

Hafta Vasuli (Extortion) is a 1998 Indian Bollywood action drama film produced and directed by Deepak Balraj Vij. The film stars Jackie Shroff, Aditya Pancholi, Ayub Khan, Madhoo, Saadhika Randhawa in pivotal roles.

== Plot ==
Lotiram Khabadia is an MLA based in Bombay, who is corrupt, and involved in all kinds of criminal activities. He has close links with another gangster and wrestler, Tamancha. With elections coming closer, Lotiram and Tamancha start canvassing for themselves, to retain power. Their competitor is an eunuch by the name of Chayavati. The people announce their verdict, and Chayavati is elected. Lotiram is devastated, as no one really pays attention to him anymore Even Tamancha will have nothing to do with him. Upset at the humiliation at the hands of Tamancha, Lotiram seeks the help of a former municipal employee, Yeshwant, and becomes a witness for the prosecution, so as to enable them to lay charges against Tamancha. Corrupt elements within the police alert Tamancha, who is enraged at Lotiram, and will do anything to stop him from testifying.

== Cast ==
- Jackie Shroff as Yeshwant Pandey
- Aditya Pancholi as Salim
- Ayub Khan as Ram Chauhan
- Madhoo as Inspector Durga
- Saadhika Randhawa as Radha
- Gulshan Grover as Lotiram Khabadiya
- Hemant Birje as Tamancha Bihari
- Laxmikant Berde as Chayavati
- Ravi Patwardhan as Senior Police Officer
- Surendra Pal as Inspector Rajendra Chauhan

== Soundtrack ==
Hafta Vasuli

Soundtrack album by Rajesh Roshan
- Released: 1997
- Genre: Feature film soundtrack
- Length: 48:06
- Language: Hindi
- Label: Bombino Music

The music of the film is composed Rajesh Roshan with lyrics by Mohan Sharma, Pandit Visheshwar Sharma, Maya Govind & K.K Verma. The soundtrack was released in 1997 on audio cassettes and CDs by Bombino Music. The album consists of six songs and two instrumental tracks. The full album is recorded by Kumar Sanu, Suchitra Krishnamurthy, Alka Yagnik, Millind Sagar, Udit Narayan Poornima (Sushma Shrestha), Nayan Rathod, and Kumar Sonik.

#	Title	Singer(s)	Lyrics By	Duration
1	"Kiss Me Come Quick"	Udit Narayan, Poornima	Mohan Sharma	5:20
2	"Logoan Sunlo Family Me Lafda Hai"	Bali Brahmabhatt, Arun Bakshi & Poornima	K.K Verma	8:35
3	"Title Song-Hafta Vasuli"	Millind Sagar & Chorus	Surender Sathi	5:08
4	"Tumne Mardo Ki Dheki Sarkar"	Nayan Rathod, Kumar Sonik	Pandit Vishweshwar Sharma	06:26
5	"Ramjee Parwano Se Bachaye"	Alka Yagnik	Maya Govind	05:12
6	"Gagan Choo Lo Mei"	Kumar Sanu, Suchitra Krishnamoorthy	Mohan Sharma	06:08
7	"Instrumental"	Rajesh Roshan	Instrumental	05:07
8	"Instrumental"	Rajesh Roshan	Instrumental	06:06
