= Kagaar: Life on the Edge =

- Directed by: N. Chandra
- Written by: Sujit Sen
- Produced by: Mrunalinni Patil
- Starring: Om Puri; Nandita Das; Amitabh Dayal; Anup Soni; Dinyar Tirandas; Aditya Kotdar
- Cinematography: Rajkumar K.
- Music by: Vishal Bhardwaj
- Release date: 10 October 2003
- Running time: 150 minutes
- Country: India
- Language: Hindi

Kagaar: Life on the Edge is a 2003 Indian Hindi-language crime drama film starring Om Puri, Nandita Das, Amitabh Dayal, and Anup Soni. The film was directed by N. Chandra and produced by Mrunalinni Patil, with Vishal Bhardwaj as music director.

The film is based on the true life story of a Mumbai cop who encountered specialist sub-inspector Daya Nayak, who has been given special thanks in the film's credits. Amitabh Dayal makes his debut as sub-inspector Bhaskar Sarnaik in this flick, which is inspired by the life of encounter expert Daya Nayak.

== Synopsis ==
Naive, simple-minded, and illiterate Bhaskar Sarnaik comes to Bombay from his far-off village to look for his missing brother, Raghuvir. He comes in contact with Sub-Inspector Gokhale, who feels sorry for him and not only offers to find his brother but also employment at an Iranian restaurant. Bhaskar does find his brother - in the morgue - but decides not to tell his mother as this may break her heart. He decides to stay in Bombay and undergoes training to become a police officer. A short time later, he is also a Sub-Inspector working closely with Gokhale. He is wounded in an encounter, and his mother comes to look after him and gets him to marry Aditi (Nandita Das) from the same village, which Bhaskar does so. Then the police must hunt for Adi, a notorious hitman. When Bhaskar comes face to face with Adi, he does not shoot him, and as a result, Adi escapes. Adi then gives an interview on television that he is the childhood friend of Bhaskar and that he would never be shot at by Bhaskar. As a result, Bhaskar gets suspended from service and becomes the subject of an intensive investigation by the Crime Branch, who are now convinced that Bhaskar is on the payroll of Adi and other underworld elements.

== Cast ==
- Om Puri as Sub-Inspector Gokhle
- Nandita Das as Aditi
- Amitabh Dayal as Bhaskar Sarnaik
- Anup Soni as Adi
- Dinyar Tirandas as Rustom
- Aditya Kotdar

== Reception ==
Lata Khubchandani of India Syndicate wrote, ″Uncompromisingly brutal, this is an awesome close up of lives that are laid on the line, of men and women living on a double-edged sword. This film shows that truth is often stranger than fiction. It promises to be a disturbing and most significant film. N Chandra attempts to make a different film. Produced by Dr Mrunalinni and Smt Suryakant Patil, Kagaar has music by Vishal Bharadwaj. Gulzar has penned the lyrics. Watch out for another police drama which also dwells upon the life of a cop, his sacrifices and his urge to do his duties well.″
