= Main Aisi Kyunn Hoon =

- Created by: Hemal Thakar
- Opening theme: "Main Aisi Kyunn Hoon" by Gayatri Ganjawala,
- Country of origin: India
- Original language: Hindi
- No. of episodes: 235

Production
- Running time: Approx. 25 minutes

Original release
- Network: Sahara One
- Release: 8 October 2007 – 22 August 2008

Main Aisi Kyunn Hoon (transl. Why I'm like this) is a Hindi television serial that was shown on Sahara One channel worldwide starting from 8 October 2007 to 22 August 2008. It is based on the story of a middle-class girl Sanjana Patil, a strong-headed girl with modern outlook on life despite being born to a traditional family. It was shown on weekdays at 8:30pm.

== Plot ==
Sanjana Patil, who has imagination and a great sense of humor. She is modern in her thoughts despite being born in a middle-class joint family. Like any ordinary Indian family, Sanjana's family also pressure her to get married since she is nearing her 30s. But Sanjana has been in love with her childhood sweetheart Siddharth who is in the US, pursuing his further studies and is waiting to marry him.

Like any other love story, this story also has twist when Sanjana discovers that the man she loves (Siddharth) has been married to her boss Anuradha. Now, she is completely shattered and unable to face the reality. She wants to know to a great extent that why Siddharth broke his promise and married someone else and how she will face the man who she is in love with, who is now married to someone else.

The story takes off when caught between her modern feelings and traditional values, Sanjana refuses to move on and chooses to live in her past.

== Cast ==
- Nazneen Patel as Sanjana Patil
- Aamir Dalvi as Rahul Oberoi, Sanjana's fiancé
- Khalid Siddiqui as Siddharth, Anuradha's husband and Sanjana's childhood friend/love
- Anokhi Shrivastav as Anuradha, Siddharth's wife
- Mohan Bhandari as Mr Oberoi, builder
- Savita Prabhune as Pushpa, Sanjana's mother
- Amit Dolawat as Vicky Mehta, Anuradha's friend
- Vishal Puri as Vikram, Sanjana's fiancé
