= Pancham (TV series) =

- Intertitle
- Created by: Film & Shots Productions
- Directed by: Sachin Dev
- Starring: see below
- Opening theme: "Pancham" by RamanMahaDevan
- Country of origin: India
- Original language: Hindi
- No. of episodes: 148

Production
- Producer: Gulshan Sachdeva
- Running time: approx. 24 minutes

Original release
- Network: Zee TV
- Release: 30 August 2004 – 20 May 2005

Pancham is an Indian TV series aired on Zee TV channel, based on the life of a young teenage boy, Harpaul Rana, who wants to set the 'world' right without 'preaching'. The series premiered on 30 August 2004, and aired every Monday - Thursday at 1pm IST. The series ended on 20 May 2005.

== Cast ==
- Namit Das as Pancham
- Priyanka as Rajshree
- Rohini Hattangadi as Pancham's grandmother
- Gufi Paintal as Kishore
- Nazneen Patel as Meera
- Yatin Karyekar as Kamlesh
- Smita Malhotra as Priyanka
- Usha Bachani as Rukmini
- Adarsh Gautam as Ashok
- Manish Khanna as Namit
- Pankaj Bhatia as Ravi
- Mahru Sheikh as Lalita
- Siraj Mustafa Khan as Naresh Singhania
- Rajlaxmi Solanki as Pooja Naresh Singhania
- Alka Kaushal as Lalita
- Dinesh Kaushik
- Ranjeev Verma
- Jayant Rawal
- Pawan Kumar as Ranjeet
- Meenakshi Verma
- Brownie Parashar
- Rakesh Pandey
- Nitika Anand as Shayra
- Pratichi Mishra as Sharda Ajit Singhania
- Mreenal Deshraj / Rinku Karmakar as Lekha
- Yash Sinha as Dharam
- Prithvi Zutshi as Inspector Ronnie D' Souza
- Ramesh Rai as Advocate Chaddha
