= Ek Din Achanak (TV series) =

- Genre: Thriller
- Written by: Nishikant Roy, Rajat Vyas
- Directed by: Jaidev Chakraborty
- Starring: see below
- Country of origin: India
- Original language: Hindi
- No. of seasons: 1

Production
- Camera setup: Multi-camera
- Running time: Approx. 52 minutes
- Production company: Percept Picture Company

Original release
- Network: DD National
- Release: 21 February – 6 July 2009

Ek Din Achanak is a Hindi language thriller television series that airs on DD National channel. The series ran from 21 February 2009 to 6 July 2009 The series is produced by Percept Picture Company along with Harsh Cinevision Limited, and stars Salil Ankola and Neetha Shetty.

== Plot ==
The story revolves around college students Esha Khanna, Aman, Priya, their group and ACP Vikram Rana. The story starts with a group of friends enjoying themselves before someone tries to electrocute Esha by putting an electric wire in the bathtub, but she stays out and survives. Every time someone tries to kill her, she is saved by her luck. The show ends with her shooting herself.

== Cast ==
=== Main ===
- Salil Ankola / Sameer Dharmadhikari as ACP Vikram Rana (male lead) – Vikram is an honest but strict officer. He believes in killing criminals on the spot. He gets infuriated when commissioner Roy involves his Police Commissioner's daughter Reema in his case but later bonds with her and starts trusting her. He develops feelings for her, but keeps feelings aside to avenge the death of his younger sister Sweety whom he had raised as his own child. He ignores the hints Reema drops about her feelings for him.
- Nazneen Patel as Esha Khanna (main antagonist) (deceased) – Isha is a bubbly, outspoken girl who has a crush on Aman Mittal. She is an orphan raised by her paternal uncle who wants her killed for her lavish inheritance. Many people try to kill her, but she is saved by her luck. Her obsessive love for Aman results in her taking her own life.
- Saadhika Randhawa as Reema Roy (female lead) – Reema is included in Vikram's case by her father cum commissioner who hates Vikram to control Vikram. Reema starts developing feelings for Vikram. She tries to stop Rangaa from killing Sweety but fails. She is the one who consoles Vikram for death of Sweety and asks Vikram to look after himself for sake of the ones who really cares for him. The growing closeness between Reema and Vikram infuriates commissioner and he asks Reema to break all the bonds with him .
- Yash Pandit as Aman Mittal (parallel male lead) – Aman is son of a famous lawyer but hates his family as they had no time for him when he was a kid. Esha is his best friend and Priya is his love interest. His life takes a turn when he apparently witnesses Priya killing Esha.
- Neetha Shetty as Priya (parallel female lead) – Priya comes from a poor background. She is a beauty with a brain and has feelings for Aman. She senses Esha's feelings about Aman and warns him, but he ignores her warnings stating that Esha only thinks of him as a best friend and nothing else. She is falsely accused of killing Esha .

=== Recurring ===
- Raju Kher as Reema's father and commissioner – He hates Vikram and is jealous of him, He sends his daughter to obstruct Vikram, but gets caught in his own trap when she ends up falling for him.
- Salil Sudhakar as Madhwan (antagonist) – He is hired by Esha's Chachu to kill her.
- Kapil Soni as Vinay – He is in the group of Esha and Aman . He was a love interest of Esha's cousin Sweety, but he loves Esha and knows she has feelings for Aman. He regrets when Sweety dies, stating that he never gave her the love she deserved. Vinay is good-hearted and loved Esha for who she was and not for her property.
- Jay Badlani
- Vijay Aidasani as Esha's Chachu (antagonist) (deceased) – He Isha's uncle. He pretends to love her. He hired Madhwan and later Rangaa to kill Isha. He is eventually killed by Esha.
- Arup Pal
- Sachin Nayak as Manohar – He is the fiancée of Bela who looks like Isha.
- Nazneen Patel as Bela (deceased) – She is a look alike of Isha. She works in a dhaaba with her fiancée Manohar. She gets killed by Esha.
- Unknown as Sweety (deceased) – She is Vikram's sister and has a crush on Vinay. She dies when Rangaa kills her to avenge Vikram.
- Unknown as Rangaa (deceased) – He kills Sweety to avenge Vikram. Later he joins hands with Khanna to kill Esha but ends up dying when the victim kills the hunter.

== See also ==
- List of Hindi thriller shows
