= Ek Thi Begum =

Indian web series

- Genre: Crime; Thriller
- Based on: Sapna Didi
- Written by: Sachin Darekar
- Directed by: Sachin Darekar & Jai Tank
- Starring: Anuja Sathe; Ankit Mohan; Chinmay Mandlekar; Rajendra Shisatkar; Abhijeet Chavan
- Music by: Amitraj, Javed Ali, Sunidhi Chauhan
- Country of origin: India
- Original language: Marathi
- No. of seasons: 2
- No. of episodes: 26

Production
- Executive producer: Manish Bhogate
- Producer: Ninad Raikar
- Production location: India
- Running time: 434.46 mins
- Production company: Times Studio

Original release
- Network: MX Player
- Release: 8 April 2020 – 30 September 2021

Ek Thi Begum, an MX Original Series, is a story of a stunningly beautiful woman played by Anuja Sathe. She plays the role of Ashraf aka Sapna, the loving wife of Zaheer played by Ankit Mohan – a once confidant of Maqsood, the underworld don, but now an arch rival. When the rift between the rivals reaches ugly culmination Zaheer gets killed. Ashraf vows to overturn and destroy Masood’s illegal empire using her beauty, sensuality and acute intelligence. Ek Thi Begum is inspired by true events created, written and directed by Sachin Darekar. It was made available for streaming on MX Player for free from 8 April 2020. On September 20, 2021, MX Player unveiled the full trailer for Ek Thi Begum 2 and on 30 September 2021, the second season was released on their platform.

== Plot ==
Ek thi Begum is based on a real life ‘untold’ story of a stunningly beautiful woman – Ashraf Bhatkar, born to a poor family in Aurangabad and raised in Bombay. She became the loving wife of Zaheer – a once confidant of Maqsood but now his arch-rival. Maqsood is the biggest mafia, underworld don who operates his giant drug cartel in India from Dubai. When the rift between Maqsood and Zaheer reaches ugly culminations, Maqsood succeeds in cunningly eliminating Zaheer. In a fake encounter, on 26 July 1986, staged by police officers, Zaheer is picked up from the airport by cops and taken away to a secluded location and finally killed. Ashraf fights hard to secure justice but fails against the might of the mafia and political bigwigs. She vows to overturn and destroy Masood’s illegal empire. Using her beauty, sensuality and acute intelligence, she meticulously plans and executes dramatic strategies undertaking the role of a police informer. Ashraf becomes the biggest informer for the police and the biggest thorn in the flesh for Maqsood. Blinded with vengeance she becomes a powerful force of domination and influence. She also marries a police officer Vikram Bhosle.

Ashraf acquires so much information and prepares a file that has names and proof, which threatens to expose the nexus between politicians, corrupt cops and the mafia. To avoid the ultimate expose, an attempt to kill Ashraf takes place and the file is however not found.

Ek Thi Begum is inspired by true events and all episodes of season 1 went live on 8 April 2020 & season 2 on 30 September 2021.

== Episodes ==
The following is a list of episodes.

=== Season 1 (2020) ===
1. The big mistake (08-04-2020 Wednesday) 1

2. The turning point (08-04-2020 Wednesday) 2

3. The naked truce (08-04-2020 Wednesday) 3

4. The big hunt (08-04-2020 Wednesday) 4

5. The turmoil (08-04-2020 Wednesday) 5

6. The defeat (08-04-2020 Wednesday) 6

7. The transformation (08-04-2020 Wednesday) 7

8. The honey trap (08-04-2020 Wednesday) 8

9. The taste of blood (08-04-2020 Wednesday) 9

10. The game becomes ugly (08-04-2020 Wednesday) 10

11. The ultimate seduction (08-04-2020 Wednesday) 11

12. The big catch (08-04-2020 Wednesday) 12

13. The countdown begins (08-04-2020 Wednesday) 13

14. The final encounter (08-04-2020 Wednesday) 14

=== Season 2 (2021) ===
1. Re-birth (30-09-2021 Thursday) 15

2. Game of power (30-09-2021 Thursday) 16

3. Face-off (30-09-2021 Thursday) 17

4. Muscle meets brain (30-09-2021 Thursday) 18

5. Hunter's hunt (30-09-2021 Thursday) 19

6. Biggest deal (30-09-2021 Thursday) 20

7. Meeting the devil (30-09-2021 Thursday) 21

8. The game begins (30-09-2021 Thursday) 22

9. A deadly encounter (30-09-2021 Thursday) 23

10. Shadows of past (30-09-2021 Thursday) 24

11. Brutal truth (30-09-2021 Thursday) 25

12. The final chapter (30-09-2021 Thursday) 26

== Cast and characters ==
| Actors | Character |
|---|---|
| Anuja Sathe | Ashraf Bhatkar |
| Ankit Mohan | Zaheer Bhatkar |
| Shahab Ali | Shakeel Ansari |
| Mir Sarwar | Nari Khan |
| Vijay Nikam | Bhai Chavan |
| Sauraseni Maitra | Anita Surve |
| Hitesh Bhojraj | Ashwin Surve |
| Chinmay Mandlekar | Vikram Bhosale |
| Rajendra Shisatkar | Nana Mhatre |
| Resham | Anjali Dixit |
| Abhijeet Chavan | Insp. Tawde |
| Pradip Doiphode | Insp. Bhoir |
| Vitthal Kale | Iqbal Khan |
| Nazarr Khan | Rashid |
| Anil Nagarkar | Bhau Nare |
| Santosh Juvekar | Sawtya |
| Suchit Jadhav | Tandel |
| Ajay Gehi | Maqsood |
| Raju Aathavle | Bala Mama |
| Amitraj | Raghu Mhatre |
| Deepak Karanjikar | Commissioner Gokhale |
| Vivek Aapte | Dandekar |
| Advait Dadarkar | Rishi |
| Shivraj Walvekar | Ganpatrao Kadam |
| Vishal Kulthe | Shirodkar |
| Pratibha Goregaonkar | Zaheer Ammi |
| Ashok Sawant | Zaheer Abu |
| Amir Tadwalkar | Sulu Potya |
| Aashay Kulkarni | Victor |
| Abhijeet Jhunjaarrao | Adv. Deshmukh |
| Sagar Kale | Adv. Salvi |
| Apurva Choudhary | Reshma |
| Kalyani Vyakatesh | Sweety |
| Anjali Banarjee | Nisha |
| Suhas Deshpande | Dr. Sheikh |
| Kishore Pednekar | Judge Joshi |
| Ratnakant Nadkarni | Judge Gupte |
| Ritesh Bene | Bandya Jadhav |
| Vikas Sonawne | Hawaldar Rane |
| Pratap Kalke | Constable Shinde |
| Aslam Wadkar | Constable Pawar |
| Mahesh Rahale | Ravi Anna |
| Prashant Loke | Rokde Khabari |
| Deepti Dhotre | Sarika |
| Mitali Kalaagi | Maria |
| Asit Redij | Waman Joshi |
| Sanket Pathare | Yussuf Sayyed |
| Sajid Hussain | Linemen Mishra |
| Ashutosh Suryavanshi | Rangya |
| Raghu Jagtap | Baban |
| Vaibhav Ambekar | Manoj |

== Marketing and Release ==
=== Promotion ===
The official trailer of the web series was launched on 6 April 2020, by MX Player on YouTube. On 20 September 2021, the official trailer of the second season was released on the official Youtube account of MX Player

=== Release ===
Ek Thi Begum was made available for free streaming on MX Player from 8 April 2020. On 30 September 2021, MX Player released the second season on their platform.

== Critical response ==
The Scroll.in in a review of Ek Thi Begum, wrote, "Ek Thi Begum is hard-pressed to answer these questions despite 14 episodes at its disposal and the promise of a second season. Despite ample opportunities, Ek Thi Begum turns out to be a damp squib that ultimately adds little to the gangster canon in popular culture."
