= Choosoddaam Randi =

- VCD Cover
- Directed by: Raja Vannem Reddy
- Written by: P. Rajendra Kumar (story / dialogues)
- Screenplay by: Raja Vannem Reddy
- Based on: Thai Poranthachu (2000)
- Produced by: Sunkara Madhu Murali
- Starring: Jagapati Babu; Srikanth; Rambha
- Cinematography: K. Prasad
- Edited by: A. Sreekar Prasad
- Music by: M. M. Keeravani
- Production company: Melody Multimedia
- Release date: 18 August 2000
- Running time: 152 minutes
- Country: India
- Language: Telugu

Choosoddaam Randi (transl. Come, Let's See) is a 2000 Indian Telugu-language drama film directed by Raja Vannem Reddy and produced by Sunkara Madhu Murali under the Melody Multimedia banner. It stars Jagapati Babu, Srikanth, and Rambha with music composed by M. M. Keeravani. It is a remake of the Tamil film Thai Poranthachu (2000). Two songs were shot in Iceland, making this the first Indian movie to be filmed there.

== Cast ==
- Jagapati Babu as Aravind
- Srikanth as Bhimavaram Buchchi Babu / Babu
- Rambha as Geeta
- Kota Srinivasa Rao as Kotaiah
- Brahmanandam as Simhachalam
- Sudhakar as Anji
- Ali as Tirupati
- M. S. Narayana
- Tanikella Bharani
- AVS as Subbu
- Giri Babu as Aravind's father
- Ponnambalam as Tiger Dharma
- Banerjee as a lawyer
- K. K. Sarma
- Gautam Raju as Hotel server
- Jenny
- Saadhika Randhawa in item number
- Annapurna as Aravind's mother
- Rama Prabha as Babu's grandmother
- Siva Parvathi as Parvati
- Anitha Chowdary as herself
- Rajitha
- Bangalore Padma as hostel warden
- Krishnaveni as Amaravati
- Kalpana as Shanti
- Kalpana Rai as Kalpana Rai

== Soundtrack ==
Choosoddaam Randi

Soundtrack album by M. M. Keeravani
- Released: 2000
- Recorded: 2000
- Genre: Soundtrack
- Length: 28:11
- Label: Aditya Music
- Producer: M. M. Keeravani

M. M. Keeravani chronology
| Papa The Great (2000) | Choosoddaam Randi (2000) | Deepavali (2000) |

Music composed by M. M. Keeravani. Music released on ADITYA Music Company.

Track-List
| No. | Title | Lyrics | Singer(s) | Length |
|---|---|---|---|---|
| 1. | "Chinnanati" | Sirivennela Sitarama Sastry | S. P. Balasubrahmanyam | 5:02 |
| 2. | "Jublee Hills" | Veturi | S. P. Balasubrahmanyam | 4:37 |
| 3. | "Dumuvulu" | Veturi | Sukhwinder Singh, Mahalakshmi Iyer | 4:49 |
| 4. | "Anda Pinda Brahmanda" | Veturi | Sukhwinder Singh, Mahalakshmi Iyer | 5:11 |
| 5. | "Emani Cheppanuraa" | Veturi | Mano, L. R. Eswari | 5:00 |
| 6. | "Chinnanati-II" | Sirivennela Sitarama Sastry | M. M. Keeravani | 3:32 |
| Total length: | | | | 28:11 |

== Reception ==
Full Hyderabad wrote "There is nothing in the film that can make you sit through two-and-a-half hours [..] The film looks so silly that even those who like sentimental dramas will not want to have any of it". Andhra Today wrote "This love triangle offers nothing very different from its predecessors, if only it had any promise of the "unexpected", it would have had chances of a success. With neither a strong story nor novelty, this movie will not find audience appreciation". Indiainfo wrote "All in all, an enjoyable fare though one can’t exit without wondering at the lack of connectivity between the title and the theme".
