= 2 October (film) =

- Directed by: Sunil Tiwari
- Written by: Sunil Tiwari
- Produced by: K.G. Sharma; Sunil Tiwari
- Starring: Ashutosh Rana; Sharat Saxena; Saadhika Randhawa; Mukesh Tiwari
- Distributed by: Sarthak Movies
- Release date: 5 September 2003
- Running time: 122 minutes
- Country: India
- Language: Hindi

2 October is a 2003 Indian Hindi-language action thriller film directed and produced by Sunil Tiwary. This movie was released on 5 September 2003 under the banner of Sarthak Movies.

== Plot ==
One day the police commissioner discovers that Interpol-wanted criminal Bhau is staying in Bombay. He informs the matter to Chief Minister. C.M instructs him to secretly finish Bhau because he is politically influenced. Hence the commissioner gives a charge to Karan Abhayankar. Karan is a fearless and honest police officer trying to clean the city from the gangster. Karan targets Bhau to wipe out in 2 October because this is the birthday of Mahatma Gandhi, father of the nation. To fulfill his mission, Karan faced many obstacles from influential people.

== Cast ==
- Ashutosh Rana as Karan Abhyankar
- Shivaji Satam as Chief Minister
- Avtar Gill as Police commissioner
- Sharat Saxena as Bhau
- Saadhika Randhawa as Swapna
- Rocky Verma as Mohan
- Mukesh Tiwari
- Makarand Deshpande

== Music ==
The music was composed by Sunil Jha and the lyrics were written by Sunil Jha and A. K. Vyas.

- "Chand Taaron Mein Nazar Aye" by Udit Narayan, Sadhana Sargam
- "Chand Taaron Mein (Sad)" by Udit Narayan
