= Kaay Raav Tumhi =

- Directed by: Mrunalinni Patil
- Written by: Anand More
- Based on: Shaukeen by Basu Chatterjee
- Produced by: Shivam Patil
- Starring: Yatin Karyekar; Satish Pulekar; Ravindra Mahajani; Niyati Joshi; Hemant Dhome
- Cinematography: Jehangir Choudhary
- Music by: Kanakraj
- Production company: Suryaa Films Kreation
- Release date: 3 April 2015
- Country: India
- Language: Marathi

Kaay Raav Tumhi is a Marathi language comedy movie released in 2015. directed by Mrunalinni Patil. It is a remake of Basu Chatterjee's 1982 Bengali film Shoukheeen.

== Plot ==
Kay Raav Tumhi revolves around three friends in their 60s and a young couple. The theme and the plot of the story carries the main crux of its treatment. It depicts the way how the things can change when one unexpected turn comes in between events, and how fantasies and plans come to an end in a totally satirical form.

It deals with saucy humor, and plots which change form according to the situation. The plot also shows how various literates of the society (landlord, captain, doctor) plan events according to their fun and need, and how they fall prey to their own planning. The humor involved also has various double meanings, saucy comments which are enjoyable only according to the situation.

The treatment is simple yet the situation confuses the characters, who from within are somewhat unaware of what is actually in store for them, and are mentally prepared according to their smartly made small fun cum plan, the events that occur in the life of the protagonists, and that keeps them unaware of the reality. As they slowly come to know the reality, and how they fall prey to their own plan, they realize but laugh it off.

They also pass somewhat weird comments at each other just to prove their own selves right, which in reality does not happen and they have to accept the fact that some one else can also be much more smarter than them in doing plannings and making them face the reality, where earlier they think that people around them are good but not the best, it then dawns upon them later that they are best than them too.

The story finally shows the mental state of the smarties when their lie comes to an end and they are caught in a cat and mouse situation, where they feel awkward, funny, but great after all the ruckus comes to an end.

== Cast ==
- Yatin Karyekar
- Satish Pulekar
- Ravindra Mahajan
- Niyati Joshi
- Hemant Dhome

== Soundtrack ==
The soundtrack of Kaay Raav Tumhi was composed by Kanakraj.

Track No	Song	Singer	Music Composed By	Lyrics	Length
1	"Sodna Ga Rag Ha"	Rohit Raut & Shalamali Suhatankar	Kanak Raj	FA, Mu. Shinde, Shiv Kadam	4:44
2	"Ye To Pudun"	Kanak Raj	Kanak Raj	FA, Mu. Shinde, Shiv Kadam	4:42
3	"Halav Re Halav Re"	Vaishali Samant	Kanak Raj	FA, Mu. Shinde, Shiv Kadam	5:30
4	"Poragi Pari Sarkhi"	Kanak Raj	Kanak Raj	FA, Mu. Shinde, Shiv Kadam	5:34
5	"Angat Rangat"	Mahalaxmi Iyer	Kanak Raj	FA, Mu. Shinde, Shiv Kadam	5:37

== Controversies ==
Marathi filmmaker Dr Mrunalinni Patil filed a complaint with police against the owner of the City Pride multiplexes for not screening her film Kay Rao Tumhi, alleging that when she approached him, he misbehaved with her and used abusive language.

Her film, a comedy about three senior citizens and their pursuit of a girl, has already released at various theatres across the state.

Director Patil told Mirror, "We wanted to screen Kay Rao Tumhi at City Pride Kothrud, and have been pursuing this issue for two weeks. Authorities there refused to entertain our queries or give us any slots. Hence, I personally visited City Pride Kothrud to request them to screen my film, which is when the multiplex chain owner, Hrishikesh Chaphalkar, told me that the film is 'vulgar' and they don't wish to show it. The City Pride management is not a censor board — they have no authority to rate a film. When I said this, the owner misbehaved with me and used abusive language."

However, Chaphalkar dismissed the claims, saying, "Our multiplex is known for promoting Marathi movies. We always encourage Marathi filmmakers. I was out of station and don't know who used abusive language."

Patil filed the complaint at Erandwane police station on Tuesday, and says she is going to send a letter to the state's Cultural Ministry, detailing how City Pride is discriminating against Marathi films.

Meanwhile, the Maharashtra government's decision to make it mandatory for state multiplexes to screen at least one Marathi film in primetime slots was announced by state culture minister Vinod Tawde, who disclosed on Tuesday, "We are in the process of enacting a law to make it mandatory for multiplexes to screen Marathi movies from 6-9 pm."

The decision was hailed by several filmmakers from the Marathi film fraternity, who agreed that they have been facing problems trying to avail of precious screening slots in prominent theatres — at the same time, they back the City Pride multiplex chain, saying it is quite a hub for Marathi film screenings.

Said filmmaker Shrirang Godbole, director of the Indian Magic Eye production house that recently released films like Chintoo, "We often face this problem. The state government's decision is a good one, and will definitely encourage filmmakers. I cannot comment about today's incident at City Pride — personally, I have always had a very good experience with their multiplexes. Chaphalkar always supports Marathi films."

Added well-known actor-director Girish Kulkarni, who has been seen in hits like Deool, Valu and Gabhricha Paus, "Despite an overwhelming response from the public, several Marathi films have been relegated to the background when it comes to preferred screening time slots. A push from the government was necessary to tackle such discrimination. We welcome this decision. As for City Pride, it is a hub for Marathi films, and we have always received support from them. I think there must have been some sort of miscommunication in this case. I doubt Chaphalkar would use abusive language with a Marathi filmmaker."

Producer-director Mrunalinni Patil's Marathi film Kaay Raav Tumhi has become the first beneficiary of the state government's recent controversial move of ordering multiplexes to reserve the a dedicated slot for Marathi films. The rom-com, which was turned down by many chains and released only in single screens last week, is now playing at all the prominent screens in the city. While the jury is still out on whether the step is an unfair move, the audience will definitely get to see more Marathi titles in their favourite multiplex.

== Production ==
=== Development ===
"Directors like Basu Chatterjee, Hrishikesh Mukherjee and their genre of cinema has had a great influence on my mind since I was a child. I wanted to share a fragment of their illustrious work with the Marathi audience and hence decided to make this film," said Mrunali. She further added, "Kaay Raav Tumhi will not be exactly the same as Shaukeen but will be on similar lines. I will be incorporating a few changes in the script to make it suitable to the present times." The details of the cast are not revealed yet and it will be interesting to see who will portray the fun characters in the Marathi outing.

While RD Burman composed music for the original, popular music director Kanak Raj will compose the music for the movie’s Marathi version.
