= Bullet: Ek Dhamaka =

- Directed by: Irfan Khan
- Written by: Abhijeet Hegdepatil
- Produced by: Asad Sikandar
- Starring: Iqbal Khan; Aseem Merchant; Saadhika Randhawa
- Cinematography: Emil Cristov
- Music by: Anand Raj Anand
- Production company: Diana S. Films
- Distributed by: 20th Century Fox India
- Release date: 4 February 2005
- Running time: 137 minutes
- Country: India
- Language: Hindi

Bullet: Ek Dhamaka is a 2005 Hindi-language espionage action film directed by Irfan Khan and produced by Asad Sikandar. The film was released on 4 February 2005 under the banner of Diana S. Films. Iqbal Khan played the lead role in this film.

== Plot ==
Indian intelligence received an alarming report regarding the upcoming terrorist attack on 26 January, Republic Day (India). They assigned agents Bobby and Mr. Arjun Singh to infiltrate the terrorists, known to be operating from Bulgaria. Bobby and Arjun accepted this assignment, but Arjun leaves the mission when he finds out that Don Raja, a Bulgarian-based international gangster who was previously a Police Inspector of Nashik, is the mastermind behind these terrorist attacks. After resigning, he decides to chase Don Raja on his own as he has a personal grudge to settle with him. A patriotic civilian named Asad befriended Arjun. Asad lost his family to a terrorist group led by Don Raja and trying to take revenge. Boby contacted Asad for help. On the other side, Arjun also tried to convince Raja's girlfriend Sarah, an ex-film heroine, for information, but the latter was arrested by the Bulgarian police as a suspected terrorist. One Indian-Bulgarian female police officer, Sofie, helped him escape from the prison and assist Arjun in the mission. Arjun realized that an Indian secret agent is working for Don Raja.

== Cast ==
- Iqbal Khan as Arjun Singh
- Saadhika Randhawa as Sarah
- Asad Sikandar as Asad Kashmiri
- Aseem Merchant as Don Raja
- Saayli Buva as Bobby Kaur
- Natalya Gurkova as Asad's Wife
- Rosy Vanrose as Sofie
