= Saadhika Randhawa =

Indian actress

Saadhika
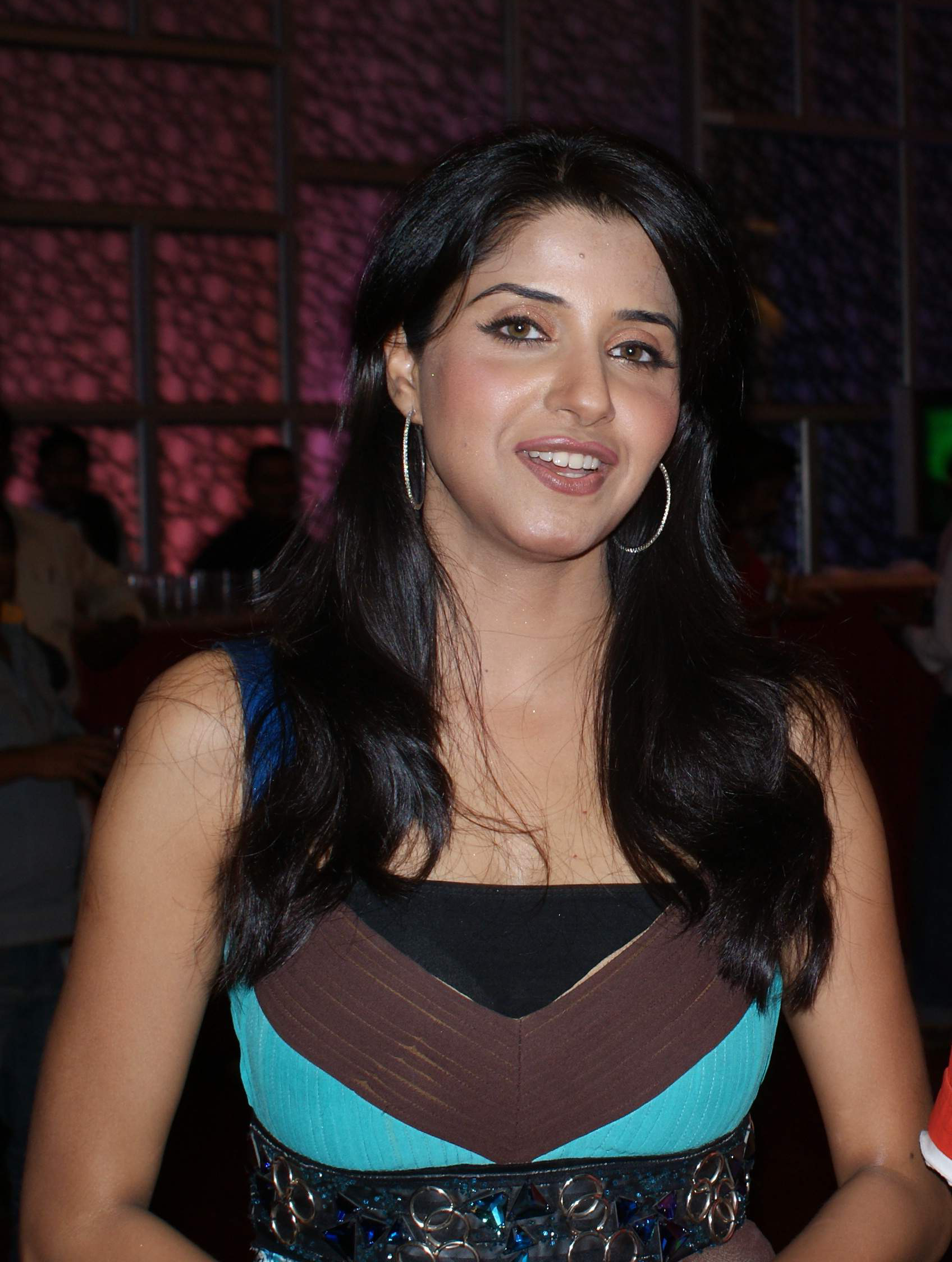
- Saadhika in 2005
- Occupation: Actress
- Years active: 1995–present
- Relatives: Jesse Randhawa (sister)

Saadhika Randhawa, also known mononymously as Saadhika, is an Indian actress. She has mainly appeared in Hindi language Bollywood movies and has also worked in several regional language movies including in Telugu, Punjabi, Gujarati, Marathi and Bhojpuri movie industries.

Saadhika made her debut in 1995 in Sanam Harjai. After that, she performed in 1997 with Saawan Kumar's Salma Pe Dil Aa Gaya, opposite Ayub Khan. Saadhika appeared in a number of films in multiple languages including Hafta Vasuli, Suswagatham, Ab Ke Baras, Pyaasa, 2 October, Kash Aap Hamare Hote, Shikaar, Bullet: Ek Dhamaka and Aggar. Starting 2010, she has played the lead in female centric movies like the Punjabi film Simran and Hindi movies Rivaaz, Chand Ke Pare and Bhanwari Ka Jaal.

== Personal life ==
Her elder sister is model and actress Jesse Randhawa.

== Career ==
=== 1993 - 1997 : Debut and breakthrough ===
She emailed her photographs to Saawan Kumar. He signed her alongside Simran for Sanam Harjai which released in 1995. It was the first Indian film to be shot in New Zealand. This movie upon its release failed to make an impact at the box office. In 1997 she went on to star as the title lead Salma in the film Salma Pe Dil Aa Gaya opposite actor Ayub Khan. The same year she also made her debut there with Telugu movie Hello I Love You.

=== 1998 - 2009 : Success in commercial movies ===
Starting 1998, she worked in films in the movie industry of South India. While in Bollywood she featured with actor Ayub Khan once again in the multi starrer Hafta Vasuli.

In the year 2000, she did a full time return to Bollywood and played the lead in Sabse Bada Beiman. She had several releases in 2002 like Kaaboo, Ab Ke Baras and Pyaasa. She played character with shades of grey in Kash Aap Hamare Hote (2003), Shikaar (2004) and Bullet: Ek Dhamaka (2005). She later signed projects like Ananth opposite Krushna Abhishek, Raj Sippy's Mr.Khujali, Ravi Sinha's Ghaav opposite Hyder Khan, The Real Cyanide, My Friend Ganesha 4 and producer Ved Gandhi's Aye Watan. All of these got shelved, remain unreleased and from some she opted out due to shooting date related issues. Saadhika played glamorous roles in Aggar (2007), Phir Tauba Tauba (2008) and Meri Padosan (2009). She also appeared in item numbers in several films like Choosoddaam Randi (2000), Satta (2003), Janam Janam Ke Saath (2007) and Wake Up India (2013). She has featured in album songs like Yeh Kaali Kaali Aakhen Remix sung by Aditya Narayan and worked with popular singer Daler Mehndi in his music video album Nabi Buba Nabi.

Saadhika has also featured in Bhojpuri cinema, including the films Pyar Ke Bandhan and Purab. She paired with Ravi Kishan in the films Dharam Veer, Paandav and Chandu Ki Chameli. She also worked in other Bhojpuri movies like Brijwa, Saat Saheliyan and Abhay Sinha's Janam Janam Ke Saath.

=== 2010 - Present : Shift to realistic cinema ===
In 2010, she played the title role in the Punjabi movie Simran opposite actor Guggu Gill. This movie was based on the concept of loving the girl child. She was then seen opposite actor Naveen Vadde in Telugu movie Uncle Aunty Nandagopal. The following year she played a village belle in Hindi movie Rivaaz. Her other notable releases are Sai Ek Prerna (2011), Chand Ke Pare (2012), Saanwariya - Khatu Shyam Ji Ki Amar Gatha (2013) and Bhanwari Ka Jaal (2014). She played the role of a ghost in the movie Anhoni Saya which saw a digital release in 2016. Her most recent release was director Vicky Ranawat's Satya Sai Baba in January 2021 where she featured with actor Jackie Shroff and has singer Anup Jalota playing the titular role. This movie was released in four languages - English, Hindi, Telugu and Marathi. She is currently shooting for its sequel Satya Sai Baba 2 which is the directorial debut of singer Anup Jalota.

=== Television work ===
Throughout her career she kept balancing her commitments to movies with big budget Television serials. She played the role of a top model opposite actor Sanjay Kapoor in Karishma - The Miracles of Destiny and was seen in a traditional look in Jhilmil Sitaron Ka Aangan Hoga. She played the role of Indumati in the mythological Shobha Somnath Ki. She played lead role in 2009 Doordarshan serials Ek Din Achanak (TV series) and Panaah. She was seen as the title lead in Chandramukhi directed by Sunil Agnihotri and producer Dheeraj Kumar's family drama Hamari Bahu Tulsi. She started her own production company and during 2014 - 2016 she produced and acted as the lead in the Doordarshan prime time weekend show Janmon Ka Bandhan.

She is the winner of the 4th Annual Cinema Aajtak Achievers Awards (2020) under the Award category - Most Gorgeous Actress in Bollywood.

== Filmography ==
Year	Film	Role	Language	Notes
1995	Sanam Harjai		Hindi	
1997	Hello I Love You	Raja Hamsa	Telugu	
1997	Salma Pe Dil Aa Gaya		Hindi	
1998	Sambhavam	Sirisha	Telugu	
1998	Suswagatham		Telugu	
1998	Hafta Vasuli	Radha	Hindi	
1999	Mother		Hindi	Guest Appearance
1999	Yamajathakudu	Pothana	Telugu	
2000	Daldu Chorayu Dhire Dhire	Radha	Gujarati	
2000	Choosoddaam Randi		Telugu	Guest Appearance
2000	Goppinti Alludu		Telugu	
2000	Sabse Bada Beiman		Hindi	
2002	Ab Ke Baras		Hindi	
2002	Kaaboo		Hindi	
2002	Pyaasa	Suman	Hindi	
2002	Khajuraho The Divine Temple		Hindi	
2003	Satta		Hindi	Guest appearance
2003	Kash Aap Hamare Hote	Simone	Hindi	
2003	2 October		Hindi	
2004	Shikaar	Kamya	Hindi	
2005	Bullet: Ek Dhamaka	Saadhika	Hindi	
2005	Dhamkee The Extortion		Hindi	
2005	Model The Beauty		Hindi	
2006	Manoranjan		Hindi	Guest Appearance
2007	Pyar Ke Bandhan		Bhojpuri	
2007	Purab Man from the east		Bhojpuri	
2007	Paandav		Bhojpuri	
2007	Janam Janam Ke Saath		Bhojpuri	Guest Appearance
2007	Khallas Beginning of the end		Hindi	Guest Appearance
2007	Love In India		Hindi	
2007	Aggar		Hindi	
2008	Phir Tauba Tauba	Rubina	Hindi	
2008	Dharam Veer		Bhojpuri	
2009	Brijwa		Bhojpuri	
2009	Sun La Arajiya Hamar		Bhojpuri	
2009	Meri Padosan		Hindi	
2010	Simran		Punjabi	
2010	Aunty Uncle Nandagopal		Telugu	
2010	Dharmatma		Bhojpuri	
2010	Chandu Ki Chameli		Bhojpuri	
2010	Saat Saheliyan		Bhojpuri	Guest Appearance
2011	Sai Ek Prerna		Hindi	
2011	Black & White Fact		Hindi	
2011	Rivaaz		Hindi	
2012	Chand Ke Pare		Hindi	
2013	Saanwariya		Hindi	
2013	Wake Up India		Hindi	Guest Appearance
2013	My Friend Ganesha 4		Hindi	
2014	Bhanwari Ka Jaal		Hindi	
2016	Anhoni Saya		Hindi	
2021	Satya Sai Baba		Hindi	
2021	O Ammayi Crime Story		Telugu	

== TV shows ==
- Karishma - The Miracles of Destiny (2003 - 2004) as Saadhika
- Chandramukhi (2007) as Chandramukhi (Title Lead)
- Hamari Bahu Tulsi (2007 - 2008) as Anamika/Tulsi (Title Lead)
- Ek Din Achanak (TV series) (2009) as Reema Roy (Female Lead)
- Panaah (2009)
- Shobha Somnath Ki (2012) as Indumati
- Janmo Ka Bandhan (2014 - 2015)
