= Goppinti Alludu =

- Theatrical release poster
- Directed by: E. V. V. Satyanarayana
- Written by: Janardhan Maharshi (dialogues)
- Screenplay by: E. V. V. Satyanarayana
- Story by: Ramakrishna Studios Unit
- Based on: Hero No. 1
- Produced by: Nandamuri Rama Krishna
- Starring: Nandamuri Balakrishna; Simran; Sanghavi; Sadhika
- Cinematography: Nandamuri Mohana Krishna
- Edited by: Kotagiri Venkateswara Rao
- Music by: Koti
- Production company: Ramakrishna Cine Studios
- Release date: 21 July 2000
- Running time: 160 minutes
- Country: India
- Language: Telugu

Goppinti Alludu (transl. Great Family's Son-in-Law) is a 2000 Telugu-language comedy film, produced by Nandamuri Rama Krishna on Ramakrishna Cine Studios banner and directed by E. V. V. Satyanarayana. The film stars Nandamuri Balakrishna, Simran, Sanghavi, Sadhika and music composed by Koti. It is a remake of the Hindi film Hero No. 1 (1997), which itself is based on the 1966 Bengali film Galpo Holeo Satti. The film was released on 21 July 2000.

== Cast ==
- Nandamuri Balakrishna as Murali Manohar / Bheemudu
- Simran as Sowmya
- Sanghavi as Jalandhara
- Sadhika as Jiddu Balamani
- Satyanarayana as Achyutha Rammaiah
- SP Balasubramanyam as SVR
- Kota Srinivasa Rao as Jiddu Bharadwaja
- Tanikella Bharani as Achyutha Rammaiha's elder son-in-law
- Chalapathi Rao as Subba Rao
- Jaya Prakash Reddy as Swamy Naidu
- Babloo Prithviraj as Paramahamsa
- Surya as Achyutha Rammaiha's third son-in-law
- Ahuti Prasad as Achyutha Rammaiha's second son-in-law
- Mallikarjuna Rao as Pandu, a cook
- L.B. Sriram as Servant
- Gundu Hanumantha Rao
- Sudha as Achyutha Rammaiha's elder daughter
- Shanoor Sana as Achyutha Rammaiha's second daughter
- Hema as Achyutha Rammaiha's third daughter
- Madhumani as Widow
- Kalpana Rai as Servant

== Soundtrack ==
Music composed by Koti.

Track listing
No.	Title	Lyrics	Singer(s)	Length
1.	"Nee Height India Gate"	Bhuvanachandra	Sukhwinder Singh, Poornima	4:01
2.	"Naachere Naachere"	Samavedam Shanmukha Sarma	Sukhwinder Singh, Manasi Scott	4:30
3.	"Muddoche Gopala"	Surendra Krishna	K. S. Chithra	3:55
4.	"Premiste Entho Great"	Bhuvanachandra	Devan, K. S. Chithra	4:17
5.	"Vachestundo Chestundo"	Bhaskarabhatla	S. P. Balasubrahmanyam, K. S. Chithra	4:17
6.	"Ammagariki Pessarattu"	Bhuvanachandra	S. P. Balasubrahmanyam	4:24
Total length:				25:24

== Reception ==
Jeevi from Idlebrain.com gave a three-star rating and commented, "EVV exploited and played with the unexposed comic timing of Balayya in this film. He has done a wonderful job". Another critic commended the film saying, "Goppinti Alludu is a laugh riot all through, you'll enjoy it." Andhra Today wrote "The director attempts a novel approach with a run-of-the-mill story by playing up the comical aspect thereby providing good entertainment to the audience. EVV Satyanarayana known for his acumen with rib-tickling comedy, does not optimize on his potential in this family drama". Indiainfo wrote "EVV has packed in a lot of comedy and melodrama to make the film a safe bet at the box office. However, the comedy transcends limits of decency at places and is a disgrace to the female characters in the film. Balakrishna's acting is obviously targeted at his fans and the frontbenchers. Both the leading ladies, Simran and Sanghavi do justice to their respective roles".
