= Gajra Kottary =

Indian screenwriter

- Born: Delhi, India
- Education: Lady Shri Ram College for Women, Indian Institute of Mass Communication
- Occupation: Author screenwriter
- Years active: 2000–present
- Website: Gajra Kottary

Gajra Kottary is an Indian author, screenwriter and TedX speaker. She is best known for writing the television series Astitva...Ek Prem Kahani, Balika Vadhu, "Silsila Badalte Rishton Ka", and "Molkki" as well as for her novels and short-story collections. Her television writing has received several industry awards, including the Indian Television Academy Award (on multiple occasions), the RAPA Award, the Indian Telly Award and the Apsara Award. Her literary works include Broken Melodies (2011), Once Upon a Star (2014), Girls Don't Cry (2017) and Autumn Blossoms (2023).

== Early life ==
Gajra Kottary was born in Delhi, India, and was educated at the Convent of Jesus and Mary and Lady Shri Ram College for Women. In 1988, she completed the post-graduate course in journalism at the Indian Institute of Mass Communication. She worked briefly as a journalist, initially at The Statesman and later at the Magna group. Kottary also wrote on developmental and women's issues for CHOICES, the magazine of the United Nations Development Program.

== Career ==
Kottary debuted as an author in early 1996 with her first collection of women-centric short stories, titled, Fragile Victories. This was followed by The Last Laugh. Her debut novel, Broken Melodies, was published in 2011 along with its Hindi translation by Bikhre Sur. Gajra subsequently co-authored her first original Hindi novel, Kora Kaagaz.

Following this was her first long running daily of 668 episodes, the award-winning Astitva...Ek Prem Kahani. She later wrote 2175 episodes on 12 April 2016 for Balika Vadhu, on Colors TV. It has been entered as the longest-running Hindi soap opera on Indian television in the Limca Book of Records, 2016.

Kottary has also written the story for the 55-episode serial, Buddha. She has written Jyoti, Godh Bharai, Panaah, Ghar Ek Sapna and Ek Veer ki Ardaas. She was a creative producer for Zee's Zindagi channel, namely TV Ke Uss Paar and Khwaabon Ki Zamin Par.

Kottary's recent shows Silsila Badalte Rishton Ka (2018), Molkki (2021) and Na Umra Ki Seema Ho (2022) shed light on several social phenomena such as bride "buying" and societal perceptions concerning age gaps in marriage, bringing her much critical acclaim.

== Awards ==
Kottary has won the Indian Television Academy Award, the RAPA award, the Indian Telly Award, the Apsara Award and the Global Indian Television's Best Writer Award.

== Selected works ==
=== Fiction ===
- Fragile Victories (1996)
- The Last Laugh (2003)
- Broken Melodies (2011)
- Once Upon a Star (2014)
- Girls Don't Cry (2017)
- Healing at the Movies (2022)
- Autumn Blossoms (2023)

== Television ==
=== Writer ===
Year	Serial
2001	Hamare Tumhare
2002–2006	Astitva...Ek Prem Kahani
2007–2009	Ghar Ek Sapnaa
2008–2016	Balika Vadhu
2009–2010	Jyoti
2009	Panaah
2010–2010	Godh Bharaai
2012–2015	Ek Veer Ki Ardaas...Veera
2013–2014	Buddha
2014–2016	Satrangi Sasural
2018–2019	Silsila Badalte Rishton Ka
2020–2021	Molkki
2022	Na Umra Ki Seema Ho
2023	Cinta Yang Tak Sederhana (Indonesian TV series)
