= Panaah (TV series) =

- Genre: Family Drama
- Written by: Gajra Kottary
- Directed by: Himanshu Consul
- Starring: Shweta Gulati; Micky Dudani; Saadhika Randhawa; Nikhil Arya; Saira Khan; Reshma Modi
- Opening theme: Gulzar
- Country of origin: India
- Original language: Hindi
- No. of seasons: 1
- No. of episodes: 52

Production
- Producer: N. R. Pachisia
- Editor: Mayur Popat
- Camera setup: Multi-camera
- Running time: 30 minutes

Original release
- Network: DD National
- Release: 17 March 2009

Panaah is a Hindi-language television series that aired on DD National in 2009. It is written by Gajra Kottary and deals with female foeticide.

== Cast ==
- Shweta Gulati as Shona
- Micky Dudani
- Saadhika Randhawa
- Nikhil Arya
- Saira Khan
- Reshma Modi
- Mithilesh Chaturvedi
- Muni Jha
- Niranjan Asrani
