= Aseem Merchant =

Indian actor

Aseem Merchant is an Indian actor known for his roles in Bollywood films.

== Filmography ==
Year	Film	Role	Notes
2004	Bin Tere Sanam	–	Short Film
2005	Bullet: Ek Dhamaka	Don Raja	
2006	Katputtli	–	
2007	The Train	Tony	
2009	Wanted	Golden Bhai	
2009	Aseema: Beyond Boundaries	Dr. Ishwar Rai	
2013	Singh Saab the Great	Shrivastav	
2015	Bhaag Johnny	–	

== Personal life ==
Aseem entered the Bollywood arena as a model. He divorced Mamta Raja, has a daughter Sasha Merchant. He has also dated Priyanka Chopra during her modelling days

== Controversies ==
Aseem has been in controversy for being involved in producing a biopic on Prakash Jaju, ex-manager of Priyanka Chopra.

== See also ==
- Sara Khan
- Surjit Saha
- Sayantani Ghosh
- Tina Dutta
