= Aggar (film) =

- Theatrical release poster
- Directed by: Anant Mahadevan
- Written by: S. Farhan
- Produced by: Narendra Bajaj; Shyam Bajaj
- Starring: Tusshar Kapoor; Udita Goswami; Shreyas Talpade; Saadhika Randhawa; Vikas Kalantri; Nauheed Cyrusi; Sophie Choudry
- Cinematography: K. Rajkumar
- Edited by: Manish More; Bunty Nagi
- Music by: Mithoon
- Release date: 14 September 2007
- Running time: 117 minutes
- Country: India
- Language: Hindi

Aggar (lit. 'If'), is a 2007 Indian Hindi-language romantic thriller film directed by Anant Mahadevan. It stars Udita Goswami, Tusshar Kapoor and Shreyas Talpade. It was produced by Narendra Bajaj and Shyam Bajaj. The film was released on 14 September 2007 and emerged as a box-office bomb.

== Plot ==
A young man is shown to be arrested by the police and locked up in a fort-like mental asylum. Then, the man, named Aryan, is taken out of the mental asylum by psychiatrist Dr. Aditya Merchant. Aditya is hell bent on taking Aryan out of the asylum and tells the other doctors there that he will change Aryan's life. Aryan, on the other hand, only seems to be frustrated and having severe anger issues, and not intellectually disabled or insane. He keeps having nightmares about a woman he killed inadvertently and is dying out of guilt on the inside. Finally, one day, Aditya tells Aryan about Aryan's father's death and that his last wish on his deathbed was for Aditya to get his son out of the mental hospital and give his life a fresh new start. The moment Aditya mentions Aryan's father, Aryan gets emotional and friendly with Aditya and agrees to leave the mental hospital.

Aryan's past is then shown. He had a girlfriend named Nisha who used to work in the same company. Aryan falls in love with her feisty personality and she appears to love him back too. However, one evening, when Aryan returns home from work, holding a bouquet for her, he hears her laughter from their bedroom, and when he tiptoes to their bedroom, he sees that she is having sex with their manager, Mihir. Aryan is furious and mentally disturbed seeing this, but he does nothing and walks up to the rooftop and starts exercising, to let out his anger and heartbreak. A while later, after Mihir leaves, Nisha comes up, talking to him casually, as usual, acting like nothing happened. While talking, she sits on the parapet wall of the rooftop.

The talk turns into a heated argument after she tells Aryan, in a very casual tone, that what she and Mihir have is "a business adjustment" and also that she never loved Aryan. She tells him he is a loser and that he shouldn't expect anything from her because she never gave him a commitment, while pointing her finger at him. This breaks Aryan's heart and devastates him. He pushes her pointing finger away angrily and starts to argue back looking elsewhere but suddenly sees that she isn't there. When he hears a commotion, he looks down at the road and realizes she fell down to her death when he pushed her hand angrily. He is shaken terribly and that is when he gets arrested by the police and then the police puts him in the mental hospital because they believe that he is mentally disturbed.

Back in the present, Aditya completes all the formalities and drops Aryan at his now empty house and gives him a bundle of money, telling him that Aryan's father had asked him to give it to his son. Aditya tells Aryan that he has to visit him every Saturday for counseling and that he has to relax as much as possible. Aditya then leaves, Aryan says thank you and decides to lead a normal life. However, he still keeps having nightmares, but now, he can manage. Aditya has a wife named Janhavi who runs an event management company which is a successful business and she makes a lot of money. She has an assistant named Ritu, who is not only her assistant at work but also a friend. Of late, Janhavi has been suspecting Aditya of having an affair, because he's always on the phone at odd hours and one day, when Janhavi and Ritu are shopping, they see Aditya with a woman, in his car. Janhavi follows him for a while but changes her mind and goes to the beach instead, because she doesn't want to know the truth. At the beach, she sees Aryan playing his flute and shouts at him to stop playing it because it is irritating her.

When she turns back to look at him, a few minutes later, she sees that he is gone. She goes home, has a fight with Aditya and goes to bed, without giving him a chance to explain himself. A few days later, at a coffee shop, Aryan is waiting to take his coffee and when he turns around with the tray in his hand, he collides with Ritu who was standing right behind him in the queue. Ritu has the schedule papers of an upcoming event in her hand and they're now drenched in coffee. Aryan apologizes and offers to help her reschedule it. Reluctantly, she agrees. But when he actually reschedules it, she is impressed and asks him which event management company he works for and he tells her he is unemployed.

Surprised that such a creative and talented person is unemployed, she asks him if he would like to work at her company as a scheduling assistant. He accepts her offer, gets interviewed by Janhavi and gets the job. With his very first schedule, he impresses Janhavi. They both get attracted to each other but Janhavi keeps trying to control herself. They then fly to Bangkok for an event and get intimate with each other after getting drunk. The fashion event, planned by Janhavi and scheduled by Aryan, goes really well. By the time they return to India, it has turned into a full blown affair, with Aryan now calling Janhavi 'baby'. He is smitten by and obsessed with her. They find peace and comfort in each other, both having had their partners cheat them. Ritu falls for Aryan and asks him out for coffee, but he rejects her and tells her to never touch him again.

Once back in India, Janhavi goes home and sees Aditya sitting with the woman she saw him with the other day. She is furious and tells Aditya to throw her out or that she will leave immediately. Aditya then tells her that she can go wherever she wants but before that, she must listen to him. He finally tells her that the woman is not his girlfriend but Radha Mehra, the interior designer who was secretly hired by him, to design the new house Aditya bought for Janhavi, which he was going to gift her on her birthday. Janhavi is shocked to know this, because now she has no reason to hate Aditya and no longer wants the comfort and company of Aryan. She never loved Aryan, just felt good in his presence after feeling ignored by Aditya. She turns out to be the typical selfish married person using young single people just for temporary comfort and choosing their spouse at the end of the day, discarding their lover.

She suddenly loses her attraction towards Aryan and starts to avoid his calls and messages, while he starts to worry about her. Janhavi decides to tell Aditya the truth, but is unable to do so out of fear and because he changes the topic and leaves. She realizes how much he loves her and decides to throw Aryan out of her life forever and start afresh with Aditya. In the meantime, Aryan visits Aditya for a counseling session and tells him that he's madly in love with a woman who is married, but does not reveal anything about her to Aditya, in spite of being asked multiple times. Aditya finally gives up and lets go but tells Aryan to be careful and that being in love with a married woman is not going to take him anywhere.

Aryan's mind gets disturbed and mentally affected yet again and he begins to hallucinate about him pushing Janhavi off a balcony and killing her the same way he killed Nisha. He keeps calling and messaging Janhavi like a maniac and when out of anger and fear, she fires him, he shouts at her saying she used him. She has no reply to that and storms off. He swears to her that he won't spare her for using him and treating him like an object. Out of the anger of being used, one evening, Aryan secretly enters Aditya's house, not knowing that Janhavi is his wife, and tries to kill Janhavi in a psychotic enraged.

But in the nick of time, Aditya returns home and saves Janhavi. He is shocked to see Aryan there. He understands everything immediately. Aryan leaves after hitting Aditya on the head with a lamp and Janhavi stands there crying and feeling ashamed of herself. But out of his love for Janhavi, he forgives her after being angry for a while.

Janhavi is really scared of Aryan now and tells Ritu that she won't be coming to work for the next one week and that she doesn't want to be disturbed. Then, she tells Aditya that they should enter their new house the next day, much before her birthday, because "she just wants to go somewhere far away" with Aditya and lead a beautiful life with him. Aditya agrees but first, he goes to the police station to complain against Aryan and get a restraining order against him.

Meanwhile, Aryan accepts his fate and decides to leave Mumbai and go to some other place. He reaches the airport and is about to buy a ticket to Delhi or Goa, but sees in a TV that a lookout notice has been released for Aryan and that the police is looking for him. He quickly leaves the airport before he can be spotted by someone and walks aimlessly with his luggage. Suddenly, when he is in a deserted alley, Ritu drives up behind him and asks him to get inside her car immediately. She takes him to her house and asks him to stay there.

He suddenly overhears Ritu apparently on a call with Janhavi and sees her noting down Janhavi's new address to which she has to post some documents. When she gets up and leaves, Aryan quickly runs to mentally note the address and hunt down Janhavi, because now his fate has dragged him back to her, through Ritu. Ritu sees him reading her diary and understands what he's up to. She warns him to stay away from Janhavi, for his own good. But now Aryan thinks fate has given him another chance to kill Janhavi and forces Ritu to drive him to Aditya and Janhavi's new house, which is actually outside the city, in an isolated area. Ritu has no other option but to do so. So she drives him to their house. He asks her to stop the car in a deserted, forest like place, then gets out of the car to walk to their house, after tying Ritu's hands to the steering wheel with a rope, so she doesn't drive away or try to stop him. At the same time, Aditya leaves the house to buy some food and grocery.

On his way to the nearest shop, he sees a car parked in a forest like area and hears the faint cries of a woman. He stops his car and approaches the parked car, and is shocked to see Ritu inside. Unable to open the locked doors, he breaks a window and gets inside the car. He unties Ritu's hands and asks her why she is here. Ritu tells him Aryan is headed towards their house to kill Janhavi.

Aditya then runs towards the house that Janhavi is in and is chased by Aryan. Aryan tries to tell Janhavi the truth and kill Aditya to protect her but she picks up a heavy shovel and hits Aryan with it to protect Aditya, seemingly killing him. His body is shown floating in the pool while Aditya is trying to kill Janhavi inside the house. Aditya understimates Janhavi's strength and does not use enough energy to pin her down, so she kicks him and runs away, with him chasing her. Inside the woods, as Aditya is trying to kill her, Aryan appears from behind and kills Aditya with the fights same shovel, saving Janhavi's life.

Aryan gets arrested again and is in prison, but Janhavi bails him out. He no longer wants to talk to her and walks away after being released but she tells him that this time, unlike how Aditya got him out of the mental hospital to use him, she has come to apologize to him and help him start afresh. He still walks away and Janhavi goes after him in her car and asks him if he wants to be her new scheduling assistant. Aryans slightly smiles and gets into her car, understanding that her intentions are good.

== Cast ==
- Udita Goswami as Jhanvi Merchant
- Tusshar Kapoor as Aryan Mehta, Jhanvi's love interest
- Shreyas Talpade as Dr. Aditya Merchant, Jhanvi's husband
- Saadhika Randhawa as Radha
- Vikas Kalantri as Mihir Rao
- Nauheed Cyrusi as Ritu Chaudhary
- Sophie Choudry as Nisha Raval (special appearance)

== Soundtrack ==
The Soundtrack of the film was composed by Mithoon, and the lyrics were by Sayeed Quadri. Joginder Tuteja from Bollywood Hungama gave the album 3 stars out of 5, stating that while the album did not have one single track which could be marked as THE song of the album, it had a fine assortment of numbers belonging to different genres which made it a decent listening experience.

Song	Singer(s)
"Ke Bin Tere Jeena Nahi"	Mithoon, Hamza Faruqui, Kshitij Tarey
"Ke Bin Tere Jeena Nahi-Remix"	Mithoon, Hamza Faruqui, Kshitij Tarey
"Paas Aaya Kyon"	Mithoon & Sharmishtha
"Sehra"	Roop Kumar Rathod & Shilpa Rao
"Nachle Nachle Nachle"	Josh
"Aggar"	Hamza Faruqui & Tulsi Kumar

== Reception ==
Patcy N of Rediff.com gave the film 3.5 out of 5, writing, "This well-woven thriller keeps you involved throughout, and one can't help but appreciate the director's efforts." Subhash K Jha of IANS gave the film 2 out of 5, writing, "Well-packaged and evenly narrated, Aggar has a plot that keeps the narration going at a hot trot till the very last visual spills out in a pool of blood."

=== Box office ===
The film was a financial debacle, which Tusshar Kapoor acknowledged and attributed to poor publicity; he felt that releasing the film during the holy month of Ramzan and Ganesh Chaturthi as well as the India-Pakistan match left viewers with no time for Aggar.
