= Dee Saturday Night =

2014 Indian film directed by Jay Prakash

- Theatrical release poster
- Directed by: Jay Prakkash
- Written by: Meraq Mirza
- Based on: Rave Parties
- Produced by: Y . K. Sharma; Roli Prakash
- Starring: Prashant Narayanan; Arif Zakaria; Aman Verma; Amit Dimri; Mahi Khanduri; Gaurav Dixit; Nazneen Patel
- Music by: SRK Music
- Release date: 21 February 2014
- Country: India
- Language: Hindi

Dee Saturday Night (transl. Luck on Saturday night) is a 2014 Indian Hindi-language film directed by Jay Prakash. The film was released on 21 February 2014. It stars Prashant Narayanan, Arif Zakaria, Aman Verma, Amit Dimri, Vivek Rajput, Mahi Khanduri, Gaurav Dixit, Mushtaq Khan, Vishwajeet Pradhan, Nazneen Patel.

== Cast ==
- Prashant Narayanan
- Arif Zakaria
- Aman Verma
- Mahi Khanduri as Shivani Dixit,
- Gaurav Dixit
- Mushtaq Khan
- Vishwajeet Pradhan
- Nazneen Patel
- Bobby Darling
- Amit Dimri
- Vijendra Vijay as Rajeev
- Vivek Rajput
- Wasim Khan as mangesh

== Soundtrack ==
The music of the film was unveiled in September 2013 by Ravi Kishan.

Track listing
No.	Title	Lyrics	Music	Singer(s)	Length
1.	"Ishq Ki Aag"	Sandeepnath	Sameer Tandon	Kailash Kher	4:04
2.	"Jhatak Ke Nacho"	Sandeepnath	Sameer Tandon	Ankit Tiwari, Akriti Kakkar, Suzanne D'Mello, Shivi Singh	5:00
3.	"Saturday Night"	Sandeepnath	Ankit Tiwari, Akriti Kakkar, Suzanne D'mello, Shivi Singh	Shaan, Keerthi Sagathia, Palak Muchhal	4:36
4.	"Dagabaz Hai Yeh Waqt"	Sandeepnathd	Ankit Tiwari	Vipin Aneja	4:13
5.	"Nasha Sar Pe Chadke Bole"	Sandeepnath	Sandeepnath	Debolina Bose, Suzanne D'Mello, Rana Majumdar	3:56
Total length:					29:45
