= Manthan: Ek Amrut Pyala =

- Marathi: मंथन: एक अमृत प्याला
- Directed by: Mrunalinni Patil
- Starring: Padmini Kolhapure; Milind Gunaji; Vijay Kadam; Asawari Joshi; Suhas Palshikar; Vijay Patkar; Atisha Naik
- Cinematography: Shakil Ansari; Sanjay Khanzode
- Edited by: V.N.Mayekar
- Music by: Songs: Krishna; Background Score: Y.S. Mulki, Sanjay Marathe
- Release date: 2006
- Country: India
- Language: Marathi

Manthan: Ek Amrut Pyala (Marathi: मंथन: एक अमृत प्याला) is a 2006 Marathi film directed by Mrunalinni Patil. film starring Padmini Kolhapure, Milind Gunaji, Vijay Kadam, Asawari Joshi, Suhas Palsekar, Ashalata and Baal Karve.

== Plot ==
'Manthan' ek amrut pyala is based on an emotional journey of all the characters of different social strata through the eyes of Anjali Deshpande (Padmini Kolhapure) our main protagonist. The story starts with Deshpande family with a happy note. Anjali Deshpande (Padmini Kolhapure) is a mass communication graduate and married, has a daughter and has lost touch of outside world for the 8–9 years as naturally playing role of wife & mother. Anjali Deshpande is soft, gentle a balanced woman, fir about rights & wrong of life.

The story moves as she wants to take a job. A new journey starts & Anjali is amused, shocked at other woman's painful situations. It is easy to solve other's problems and one day her own family life takes a turn when she has become the victim of domestic violence. It is so easy while giving answers to others & seeing world. How does Anjali faces life & solves her own problem and what she understands about life and its own view points is Manthan of thoughts, life and its answer "ek amrut pyala" a positive outcome.

== Cast ==
- Padmini Kolhapure as Anjali Deshpande
- Milind Gunaji as Avinash Deshpande
- Shraddha Ranade As Amruta, plays the child Deshpande
- Suhas Palshikar As Bharat
- Atisha Naik

== Production ==
Movie has been produced by Mrunalinni Patil under "Suryaa Films Kreation".

== Soundtrack ==
"Manthan" Ek Amrut Pyala

Soundtrack album by Krishna
- Released: 2006
- Genre: Film soundtrack
