= Nazneen Patel =

Indian Television actress (born 1945)

- Born: Mumbai, Maharashtra, India
- Occupation: Actress
- Years active: 2002–2014
- Spouse: Vikram Ghai

Nazneen Patel is an Indian actress who appeared in Bollywood movies and Indian soap operas.

== Career ==
Patel made her debut with Indian soap opera, Main Aisi Kyunn Hoon in 2007. She made her Bollywood debut with the movie Good Luck!.

== Filmography ==
=== Films ===
| Title | Year | Role | Notes | Source |
|---|---|---|---|---|
| Good Luck! | 2008 | Kanchan Soni | - | |
| Dee Saturday Night | 2014 | - | - | |

=== Television ===
| Year | Title | Role | Comments |
|---|---|---|---|
| 2002–2003 | Kyun Hota Hai Pyarrr | Malini | |
| 2004 | Kaahin Kissii Roz | Rashi Sikand | |
| 2004 | Raat Hone Ko Hai | | |
| 2005 | Pancham | Meera | |
| 2005 | Aahat | Mohini | (Episode 9 & Episode 10) |
| 2005–2006 | Paalkhi | Keshavi | |
| 2006–2007 | Bhabhi | Dr. Megha | |
| 2007–2008 | Main Aisi Kyunn Hoon | Sanjana Patil | |
| 2009 | Shubh Kadam | | |
| 2009 | Ek Din Achanak | Esha Khanna | |
| 2009 | Ek Din Achanak | Bela | |
| 2010 | Aahat | Sagarika | |
| 2011 | Mukti Bandhan | Sabeena Qureshi | |
| 2012 | Fear Files: Darr Ki Sacchi Tasvirein | Episode 38 | |
| 2013 | Fear Files: Darr Ki Sacchi Tasvirein | Episode 66 | |

== See also ==
- Cinema of India
- Bollywood
