= Dashrath =

Dashrath is a given name. It may refer to:

- Dashrath Chand (1903-1941) Nepalese politician, martyr of Nepalese Democratic Movement
- Dashrath Gagrai, Indian politician and member of Jharkhand Legislative Assembly
- Dashrath Manjhi (1934–2007), Indian laborer
- Dashrath Patel (1927–2010), Indian designer, sculptor

== See also ==
- Dashrath Puri, a small colony situated on Dabri-Palam road in South West Delhi, India
