= Anuja Sathe =

Indian actress

Anuja Sathe Gokhale
- Born: Pune, India
- Occupation: Actress
- Years active: 2010–present
- Spouse: Saurabh Gokhale (m. 2013)

Anuja Sathe Gokhale is an Indian actress, mainly working in Indian film industry. She is married to actor Saurabh Gokhale.

== Career ==
Anuja began her career as a theater artist, working in numerous popular Marathi plays such as Shobha Yatra and Uttar Ratra. She then progressed to Marathi television and then Marathi mainstream cinema, and more recently Bollywood. She played the leading role as Dhara in the primetime soap opera Tamanna, on Star Plus channel; this was her first Hindi TV show. She was seen in the historical period series Peshwa Bajirao as the mother of Bajirao, Radhabai. She was also seen in Khoob Ladi Mardaani... Jhansi Ki Rani as JankiBai. She essayed the role of a mafia queen in the web-series Ek Thi Begum which streamed on MX Player.

== Personal life ==
Sathe met Saurabh Gokhale, another Marathi actor, on the sets of her show Mandala Don Ghadicha Dav. The couple tied the knot in 2013.

== Filmography ==
Key
†	Denotes films that have not yet been released

=== Films ===
Year	Title	Role	Language	Notes
2013	Asa Mee Ashi Tee		Marathi	
2014	Raakhandaar	Madhavi	Marathi	
2014	Bho Bho		Marathi	
2015	Ghantaa	Komal Bhabhi	Marathi	
2015	Coffee Ani Barach Kahi		Marathi	
2015	Bajirao Mastani	Bhiubai	Hindi	
2018	Blackmail	Prabha Ghatpandey	Hindi	
2018	Parmanu: The Story of Pokhran	Sushma Raina	Hindi	
2019	Me Pan Sachin	Devika Vaidya	Marathi	
2025	Match Fixing	Anuradha Patwardhan	Hindi	
2026	Daayra	Raman Kumar's wife	Hindi	

=== Television ===
Year	Title	Role	Language	Channel	Notes
2008	Agnihotra	Doctor Sanjana	Marathi	Star Pravah	
2011	Mandala Don Ghadicha Dav	Antara Patankar	Marathi	Star Pravah	
2011–2012	Suvasini	Sharmila	Marathi	Star Pravah	
2013–2015	Lagori Maitri Returns	Urmila	Marathi	Star Pravah	
2013	Visava – Ek Ghar Manasarkha	Herself	Marathi	Star Pravah	
2016	Tamanna	Dharaa Solanki	Hindi	Star Plus	
2017	Peshwa Bajirao	Radhabai	Hindi	Sony Entertainment Television (India)	
2019	Khoob Ladi Mardaani...Jhansi Ki Rani	JankiBai	Hindi	Colors TV	
2020	Ek Thi Begum	Ashraf Bhatkar	Hindi	MX Player	
2021–2024	Maharani	Kirti Singh	Hindi	Sony LIV	Season 1–3
2025	Chakravarti Samrat Prithviraj Chauhan	Maharani Karpura Chauhan	Hindi	Sony Entertainment Television	
2025–present	Jagadhatri	Aparna Naik	Hindi	Zee TV	
2026	Taskaree	Meenakshi	Hindi	—N/a	Netflix series
