= Yatin Karyekar =

Indian television actor

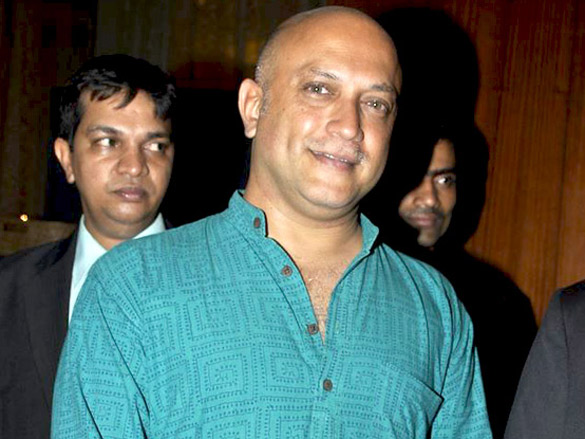
- Born: Bombay (present-day Mumbai), Maharashtra, India
- Occupation: Actor
- Years active: 1983–present
- Height: 5 ft 8 in (1.73 m)
- Spouse: Iravati Harshe (divorced)
- Relatives: Sulabha Deshpande (maternal aunt)

Yatin Karyekar is an Indian actor who primarily works in Hindi films. He gained prominence for his role in the long running 1994 television serial Shanti. He appeared in the role of Aurangzeb in popular Marathi serial Raja Shivchhatrapati.

== Early life ==
He is the son of actress Jyotsna Karyekar. His brothers are Prafulla Karyekar and Dr. Chetan Karyekar. His maternal grandfather is Vasantrao Kamerkar, who was working as a senior sound recorder in His Master's Voice. His maternal aunts are Sulabha Deshpande, Prema Sakhardande and Asha Dandavate who were the younger sisters of Jyotsna Karyekar. His maternal uncles are Chandrashekhar Kamerkar, Ashok Kamerkar and Vishwanath Kamerkar. His maternal cousin is Ninad Deshpande, who is the son of Sulabha Deshpande. His maternal sister–in–law is television actress Aditi Deshpande, who is married to Ninad Deshpande.

He was married to television actress Iravati Harshe but they got divorced. They worked together in television serials like Shanti, Saturday Suspense and Mrityudand.

== Filmography ==
=== Hindi ===
Year	Film	Role	Notes
1983	Katha	Dancer	
1984	Holi		
1988	Qayamat Se Qayamat Tak	Baba's Friend	
1989	De Taali	Supari's Henchman	
1998	Sarkarnama	Shreeniwas Gokhale	
1998	Hanuman	Inspector	
2000	Hey Ram	Mr. Qureshi	
2002	Shararat	Vijay Mathur	
2003	Munnabhai M.B.B.S.	Anand Banerjee	
2005	Iqbal		
2005	Kalyug		
2006	Alag		
2007	Eik Dasttak		
2008	Zindagi Tere Naam		
2008	Bombay To Bangkok		
2009	Aao Wish Karein		
2010	The Hangman		
2010	Karthik Calling Karthik		
2011	Soundtrack		
2011	Monica		
2011	Love U...Mr. Kalakaar!	Israni	
2011	Lanka		
2012	Rakhtbeej		
2013	Khoon Toh Hona Hi Tha		
2014	Vitti Dandu		
2014	Meinu Ek Ladki Chaahiye		
2015	Kaay Raav Tumhi		
2015	Karbonn		
2015	Daagdi Chaawl		
2015	Bajirao Mastani		
2016	Love Story Majhi Aani Tichi	Dr. Sudhir Sarpodhar	
2017	Rockey		
2017	Khopa		
2019	PM Narendra Modi		
2019	Jhalki		
2021	The Battle of Bhima Koregaon		
2022	Makaan		

=== Tamil ===
Year	Film	Role
2004	Vasool Raja MBBS	Anand
2019	A1	Anantharaman

=== Marathi ===
Year	Film	Role	Notes
2019	Girlfriend	Nachiket's father	
2024	Lek Asavi Tar Ashi		
2025	Sargam		
2026	Sammarth	Nanavati	

=== Other language films ===
Year	Film	Role	Language
2017	Nani Bai Ro Mayro		Rajasthani
2018	Reva		Gujarati
2019	The Warrior Queen of Jhansi		English

== Television ==
Year	Serial	Role	Channel
1993	Byomkesh Bakshi – Agnibaan	Manmath Rudra "Nantu" (Episode 9)	DD National
1994–1998	Shanti	Kamesh Mahadevan	DD National
1996–1997	Satya		
	Roshni		Zee TV
	Commander	Rakesh Sharma	Zee TV
	Mrityudand		Zee TV
1997	Saturday Suspense – Tanhaai	Episode 3	Zee TV
1997	Saturday Suspense – Raaz	Episode 4	Zee TV
1997	Saturday Suspense – The Final Verdict	Episode 13	Zee TV
1997	Saturday Suspense – Shinakht	Episode 32	Zee TV
1997–1998	Chattaan	Vishal Raj	Zee TV
1998	Saturday Suspense – Murder At Apollo	Episode 47	Zee TV
1998	Saturday Suspense	Episode 49	Zee TV
1998	Saturday Suspense – Kaun	Episode 57	Zee TV
1999	X Zone – Saat Phere	Pandit (Episode 84)	Zee TV
1999–2000	Tharar	Inspector Dhananjay Karnik	Zee Marathi
2000	Thriller At 10 – Junoon: Part 1 to Part 5	A.C.P. Samar Chauhan (Episode 26 to Episode 30)	Zee TV
2000	Suspense Every Week	Raj Oberoi (Episode 9)	DD National
2000–2001	Mehndi Tere Naam Ki	Rahul's Father	Zee TV
2001	Ssshhhh...Koi Hai – Laawaris	Vishwas (Episode 12)	Star Plus
2001–2003	Des Mein Niklla Hoga Chand	Rajendra "Raj" Singh Kent	Star Plus
2001–2003	Kasautii Zindagii Kay	Pranay Basu	Star Plus
2002	Tu Kahe Agar	Maya's Father	Zee TV
2002–2003	Aati Rahengi Baharein	Dr. Sahni	Zee TV
2003	Kabhie Kabhie	Purushottam (Episode 6)	Zee TV
2003–2004	Tuzyavina	Sarang Desai	Zee Marathi
2004	Kabhie Kabhie	Mohit Malhotra (Episode 13)	Zee TV
2004	Kabhie Kabhie – Uttar Dakshin	Episode 22	Zee TV
2004	Prratima	Dharmesh Thakur	Sahara One
2004	Sarabhai vs Sarabhai	Nagesh Iyer (Episode 1)	Star One
2004–2005	Pancham	Kamalesh	Zee TV
2005	Paap Punya Ka Lekha Jokha	Dr. Gajanan Saxena	DD National
2005	CID Special Bureau – Apaharan: Part 1 to Part 4	Ratanlal (Episode 125 to Episode 128)	Sony Entertainment Television
2006–2007	Risshton Ki Dor	Sharad Abhayankar / Dr. Milind Kelkar	Sony Entertainment Television
2006–2009	Ghar Ki Lakshmi Betiyaan	Suryakant Gadodia	Zee TV
2007–2008	Bhabhi	Mr. Thakral	Star Plus
2008–2009	Raja Shivchhatrapati	Aurangzeb	Star Pravah
2009–2010	Maat Pitaah Ke Charnon Mein Swarg	Satyanarayan Tripathi	Colors TV
2010	Crime Patrol		Sony Entertainment Television
2012	Ramleela – Ajay Devgn Ke Saath	Maharaj Dashrath	Life OK
2012	Savdhaan India	Episode 93	Life OK
2013	Savdhaan India	Episode 148	Life OK
2013	Saraswatichandra	Vidyachatur Desai	Star Plus
2013–2014	Dil Jo Keh Na Saka		DD National
2014–2017	Asmita	Prabhakar Agnihotri	Zee Marathi
2016	Savdhaan India	Episode 1940	Life OK
2017	Savdhaan India	Episode 1998	Life OK
2021–2022	Swarajya Saudamini Tararani	Samrat Aurangzeb	Sony Marathi
2023–2024	Baatein Kuch Ankahee Si	Vijay Karmarkar	Star Plus

=== Web series ===
Year	Show	Role	Language	Channel	Notes
2018	Full Tight	Adi's father	Marathi	SonyLIV	
2019	Veergati	Abbu	Marathi; Hindi	ZEE5	
2019	Halala	Advocate Imam Malik	Hindi	Ullu	
2026	Devkhel	Vishwanath Nimkar	Marathi	ZEE5	

== See also ==
- List of Indian film actors
